= List of Brisbane Broncos representatives =

This article lists players of the Brisbane Broncos club that have made representative appearances in State of Origin, international teams or other significant non-club teams.

== State of Origin ==
=== Queensland Maroons ===
These are people who played for the Queensland State of Origin Team while playing for the Broncos.

1988: Wally Lewis (c); Joe Kilroy; Gene Miles; Allan Langer; Greg Conescu; 1989: Wally Lewis (c); Michael Hancock; Gene Miles; Tony Currie; Peter Jackson; Allan Langer; Sam Backo; 1990: Wally Lewis (c); Dale Shearer; Willie Carne; Peter Jackson; Kevin Walters; Allan Langer; Andrew Gee; Sam Backo; Kerrod Walters; 1991: Paul Hauff; Willie Carne; Michael Hancock; Steve Renouf; Dale Shearer; Kevin Walters; Allan Langer; Andrew Gee; Gavin Allen; 1992: Willie Carne; Michael Hancock; Steve Renouf; Kevin Walters; Allan Langer; Trevor Gillmeister; Gavin Allen; 1993: Julian O'Neill; Willie Carne; Michael Hancock; Steve Renouf; Kevin Walters; Allan Langer; Mark Hohn; Kerrod Walters; Mark Hohn	1994: Julian O'Neill; Willie Carne; Michael Hancock; Steve Renouf; Kevin Walters; Allan Langer; Mark Hohn; Kerrod Walters; Andrew Gee; 1995: Gavin Allen; 1996: Allan Langer (c); Willie Carne; Michael Hancock; Steve Renouf; Wendell Sailor; Kevin Walters; Brad Thorn; Alan Cann; Andrew Gee; 1997 (Tri-Series): Allan Langer (c); Darren Lockyer; Wendell Sailor; Steve Renouf; Darren Smith; Michael Hancock; Tonie Carroll; Kevin Walters; Peter Ryan; Shane Webcke; Gorden Tallis; Andrew Gee; Brad Thorn; 1998: Allan Langer (c); Darren Lockyer; Wendell Sailor; Steve Renouf; Darren Smith; Tonie Carroll; Kevin Walters; Peter Ryan; Shane Webcke; Gorden Tallis; Brad Thorn; Andrew Gee	1999: Wendell Sailor; Kevin Walters (c); Gorden Tallis; Shane Webcke; Darren Lockyer; Brad Thorn; Tonie Carroll; 2000: Darren Lockyer; Wendell Sailor; Ben Ikin; Gorden Tallis; Tonie Carroll; Brad Thorn; Shane Webcke; 2001: Gorden Tallis (c); Darren Lockyer (c); Wendell Sailor; Shane Webcke; Lote Tuqiri; Petero Civoniceva; Brad Meyers; Chris Walker; Carl Webb; Dane Carlaw; 2002: Gorden Tallis (c); Allan Langer; Darren Lockyer; Shane Webcke; Lote Tuqiri; Petero Civoniceva; Shaun Berrigan; Dane Carlaw; Andrew Gee; Brent Tate; Carl Webb; Chris Walker; 2003: Gorden Tallis (c); Darren Lockyer; Shane Webcke; Shaun Berrigan; Petero Civoniceva; Dane Carlaw; Andrew Gee; Brent Tate; Ben Ikin; Tonie Carroll	2004: Shane Webcke (c); Darren Lockyer (c); Petero Civoniceva; Dane Carlaw; Brent Tate; Tonie Carroll; Corey Parker; 2005: Darren Lockyer (c); Petero Civoniceva; Dane Carlaw; Shaun Berrigan; Casey McGuire; Brad Thorn; Tonie Carroll; Corey Parker; 2006: Darren Lockyer (c); Petero Civoniceva; Shaun Berrigan; Brent Tate; David Stagg; Tonie Carroll; Karmichael Hunt; Sam Thaiday; Justin Hodges; 2007: Darren Lockyer (c); Petero Civoniceva; Shaun Berrigan; Brent Tate; Tonie Carroll; Karmichael Hunt; Justin Hodges; Dane Carlaw; 2008: Karmichael Hunt; Justin Hodges; PJ Marsh; Ben Hannant; Sam Thaiday; Darius Boyd; 2009: Darren Lockyer (c); Karmichael Hunt; Justin Hodges; Israel Folau; Sam Thaiday	2010: Darren Lockyer; Israel Folau; Sam Thaiday; 2011: Darren Lockyer (c); Corey Parker; Ben Hannant; Justin Hodges; Sam Thaiday; Jharal Yow Yeh; 2012: Petero Civoniceva; Ben Hannant; Justin Hodges; Matt Gillett; Corey Parker; Sam Thaiday; Ben Te'o; 2013: Sam Thaiday; Corey Parker; Justin Hodges; Matt Gillett; 2014: Sam Thaiday; Corey Parker; Justin Hodges; Matt Gillett; 2015: Sam Thaiday; Darius Boyd; Justin Hodges; Josh McGuire; Corey Parker; Matt Gillett; 2016: Darius Boyd; Matt Gillett; Josh McGuire; Sam Thaiday; Corey Oates; Corey Parker; 2017: Darius Boyd; Matt Gillett; Ben Hunt; Josh McGuire; Anthony Milford; Corey Oates; Sam Thaiday	2018: Anthony Milford; Josh McGuire; Andrew McCullough; Corey Oates; 2019: David Fifita; Matt Gillett; Corey Oates; Joe Ofahengaue; 2020: Xavier Coates; 2021: Xavier Coates; Thomas Flegler; 2022: Kurt Capewell; Patrick Carrigan; Selwyn Cobbo; Corey Oates; 2023: Patrick Carrigan; Selwyn Cobbo; Thomas Flegler; Reece Walsh; 2024: Patrick Carrigan; Selwyn Cobbo; Reece Walsh; 2025: Patrick Carrigan; Gehamat Shibasaki

=== New South Wales Blues ===
These are people who played for the New South Wales Rugby League team while playing for the Broncos.

1989: Chris Johns; Terry Matterson; 1990: Chris Johns; 1991: Chris Johns; 1992: Glenn Lazarus; Chris Johns; 1993: Glenn Lazarus	1994: Glenn Lazarus; 1996: Glenn Lazarus; 1997 (Tri-Series): Glenn Lazarus; 2001: Michael De Vere; Luke Priddis; 2003: Michael De Vere	2004: Michael De Vere; 2008: Peter Wallace; 2009: Peter Wallace; 2018: James Roberts; 2019: Payne Haas; 2020: Payne Haas	2021: Payne Haas; 2022: Payne Haas; Kotoni Staggs; 2023: Payne Haas; 2024: Payne Haas; 2025: Payne Haas

==== City Origin ====
These are people who played for City Origin while playing for the Broncos. The City Origin team is a team formed of NSW players to play against Country Origin, as a selection trial for the NSW Blues.

2003: Michael De Vere	2008: Peter Wallace	2009: Peter Wallace	2010: Peter Wallace*

== International ==
=== Australia ===
These are people who played for the Australian International Team while playing for the Broncos.

1985-1988 (World Cup): Wally Lewis (c); Greg Conescu; Allan Langer; 1988: Wally Lewis (c); Gene Miles; Allan Langer; Greg Conescu; 1989: Wally Lewis (c); Michael Hancock; Gene Miles*; Tony Currie; Peter Jackson; Allan Langer; Kerrod Walters; Sam Backo; 1989-1992 (World Cup): Michael Hancock; Allan Langer; Wally Lewis (c); Steve Renouf; Glenn Lazarus; Kerrod Walters; Kevin Walters; 1990: Wally Lewis*; Dale Shearer; Michael Hancock; Kevin Walters; Allan Langer; Chris Johns; Kerrod Walters; 1991: Paul Hauff; Willie Carne; Dale Shearer; Kerrod Walters; Steve Renouf; Chris Johns; Kevin Walters; Allan Langer; 1992: Willie Carne; Michael Hancock; Steve Renouf; Kevin Walters; Allan Langer; Chris Johns; Glenn Lazarus; Kerrod Walters	1993: Willie Carne; Michael Hancock; Steve Renouf; Kevin Walters; Allan Langer; Mark Hohn; Glenn Lazarus; 1994: Michael Hancock; Steve Renouf; Kevin Walters; Allan Langer; Mark Hohn; Glenn Lazarus; 1996: Steve Renouf**; Wendell Sailor**; Glenn Lazarus**; 1997 (Super-League): Allan Langer; Darren Lockyer; Wendell Sailor; Steve Renouf; Darren Smith; Peter Ryan; Shane Webcke; Gorden Tallis; Glenn Lazarus; Brad Thorn; 1998: Allan Langer (c); Darren Lockyer; Wendell Sailor; Steve Renouf; Darren Smith; Kevin Walters; Peter Ryan; Shane Webcke; Gorden Tallis; Brad Thorn; 1999: Wendell Sailor; Kevin Walters; Gorden Tallis; Shane Webcke; Darren Lockyer; Brad Thorn*; Allan Langer	2000: Darren Lockyer; Wendell Sailor; Gorden Tallis (c); Shane Webcke; 2000 (World Cup): Darren Lockyer; Wendell Sailor; Gorden Tallis; Shane Webcke; 2001: Darren Lockyer; Wendell Sailor; Shane Webcke; Lote Tuqiri; Petero Civoniceva; Brad Meyers; Dane Carlaw; 2002: Gorden Tallis (c); Darren Lockyer; Shane Webcke; Lote Tuqiri; Brent Tate; 2003: Gorden Tallis; Darren Lockyer (c); Shane Webcke; Petero Civoniceva; Dane Carlaw; Michael De Vere; Brent Tate; 2004: Shane Webcke; Darren Lockyer (c); Petero Civoniceva; Shaun Berrigan; Brent Tate; Tonie Carroll; Michael De Vere; 2005: Darren Lockyer (c); Petero Civoniceva; Shaun Berrigan; Tonie Carroll	2006: Darren Lockyer (c); Petero Civoniceva; Karmichael Hunt; Shaun Berrigan; Tonie Carroll*; Justin Hodges; Brent Tate; Sam Thaiday; 2007: Darren Lockyer (c); Petero Civoniceva; Karmichael Hunt; Justin Hodges; Shaun Berrigan; Brent Tate; 2008: Darren Lockyer*; Justin Hodges; 2008 (World Cup): Darren Lockyer (c); Justin Hodges*; Karmichael Hunt; Darius Boyd; 2009: Darren Lockyer (c); Justin Hodges; Israel Folau; Sam Thaiday; 2010: Sam Thaiday; Darren Lockyer (c); 2011: Darren Lockyer (c); Sam Thaiday; Justin Hodges; Ben Hannant; Corey Parker; Jharal Yow Yeh; 2012: Sam Thaiday; Justin Hodges; Ben Hannant; 2013: Justin Hodges; Sam Thaiday; 2013 (World Cup): Corey Parker; Sam Thaiday; Justin Hodges*	2014: Matt Gillett; Sam Thaiday; Ben Hunt; Corey Parker; 2015: Corey Parker; Sam Thaiday; 2016: Darius Boyd; Matt Gillett; Josh McGuire; Corey Parker; Sam Thaiday; 2017: Darius Boyd; Matt Gillett; Sam Thaiday; 2017 (World Cup): Darius Boyd*; Matt Gillett; Ben Hunt; Josh McGuire; 2018: Josh McGuire; 2019: Payne Haas; 2022 (World Cup): Patrick Carrigan; 2023: Patrick Carrigan; Selwyn Cobbo; Thomas Flegler; Payne Haas; Kotoni Staggs; 2024: Patrick Carrigan; 2025: Patrick Carrigan; Gehamat Shibasaki; Kotoni Staggs; Reece Walsh

*Withdrew due to injury
**Withdrew

=== Cook Islands ===
2009: Alex Glenn; 2010: Alex Glenn; 2015: Francis Molo; 2017: Alex Glenn (C); 2019: Alex Glenn (C); 2022: Brendan Piakura; Xavier Willison; 2022 (World Cup): Brendan Piakura; 2025: Brendan Piakura

=== England ===
2000 (World Cup): Harvey Howard; 2011: Jack Reed; 2022 (World Cup): Herbie Farnworth

=== Fiji ===
2000 (World Cup): Lote Tuquri (c)	2008 (World Cup): Ashton Sims

=== Ireland ===
2000 (World Cup): Kevin Campion

=== Japan ===
2018: Gehamat Shibasaki

=== New Zealand ===
These are people who played for the New Zealand International Team while playing for the Broncos.

2000 (World Cup): Tonie Carroll; 2003: Richard Swain; '2006: Tame Tupou; 2007: Greg Eastwood; 2008 (World Cup): Greg Eastwood; 2011: Gerard Beale; Alex Glenn; 2012: Gerard Beale; Josh Hoffman; Alex Glenn	2013: Josh Hoffman; Alex Glenn; 2013 (World Cup): Josh Hoffman; Alex Glenn; 2015: Adam Blair (C); Alex Glenn; Jordan Kahu; Kodi Nikorima; 2016: Adam Blair; Jordan Kahu; Kodi Nikorima; 2017: Adam Blair; Jordan Kahu; Kodi Nikorima	2017 (World Cup): Adam Blair (C); Kodi Nikorima; 2018: Jamayne Isaako; Kodi Nikorima; 2019: Jamayne Isaako; 2024: Jordan Riki; 2025: Xavier Willison

=== Papua New Guinea ===
2017 (World Cup): David Mead; 2019: James Segeyaro

=== Samoa ===
2010: Josh McGuire; 2014: Josh McGuire; Daniel Vidot; 2015: Josh McGuire; Daniel Vidot; 2017: Herman Ese'ese; Josh McGuire; Anthony Milford; 2017 (World Cup): Herman Ese'ese; Anthony Milford*; Tautau Moga*; 2022: Keenan Palasia; 2023: Keenan Palasia; 2024: Deine Mariner; 2025: Payne Haas; Deine Mariner

=== Scotland ===
2013 (World Cup): Peter Wallace

=== Tonga ===
2013: David Hala; 2014: David Hala; 2015: Joe Ofahengaue; 2017: Joe Ofahengaue; 2017 (World Cup): Joe Ofahengaue; Tevita Pangai Junior; 2018: Joe Ofahengaue; Tevita Pangai Junior; 2019: Joe Ofahengaue; Tevita Pangai Junior; 2022 (World Cup): Tesi Niu

=== Representative Captains ===
==== Test Captains ====
- Wally Lewis (1984–89)
- Allan Langer (1998)
- Gorden Tallis (2002–03)
- Darren Lockyer (2003–2010)

==== World Cup Captains ====
- Wally Lewis (1988 - 89) for Australia
- Gorden Tallis (2000) for Australia
- Lote Tuquiri (2000) for Fiji
- Darren Lockyer (2008) for Australia
- Adam Blair (2017) for New Zealand
- David Mead (2017) for Papua New Guinea

== All Stars Game ==
=== Indigenous All Stars ===
2010: Sam Thaiday; Jharal Yow Yeh; 2011: Jharal Yow Yeh; 2012: Justin Hodges; Sam Thaiday; Jharal Yow Yeh; 2013: Justin Hodges; Scott Prince; 2015: Justin Hodges; 2016: James Roberts; Sam Thaiday; 2019: David Fifita; James Roberts; Kotoni Staggs; 2020: David Fifita; 2022: Selwyn Cobbo; Ryan James; Albert Kelly; 2023: Selwyn Cobbo; 2024: Kotoni Staggs

=== NRL All Stars ===
2010: Darren Lockyer (c); Jharal Yow Yeh; 2011: Darren Lockyer (c); Ben Hannant; 2012: Jack Reed; 2013: Ben Hannant; 2015: Corey Parker; === World All Stars === 2016: Jordan Kahu; 2017: Jordan Kahu; David Mead; === Maori All Stars === 2020: Jordan Riki; 2021: Issac Luke; Jordan Riki; 2022: TC Robati; 2023: Jesse Arthars; Jordan Riki; 2024: Jesse Arthars; Xavier Willison; 2025: Jesse Arthars; Jordan Riki; Xavier Willison

== See also ==
- List of National Rugby League records
