= Taufua =

Taufua is a surname of Samoan origin. Notable people with the surname include:

- Jordan Taufua (born 1992), New Zealand rugby union player
- Jorge Taufua (born 1991), Australian rugby league player
- Mark Taufua (born 1981), Australian rugby league player
