= Patrick Carrigan =

Australia international rugby league footballer

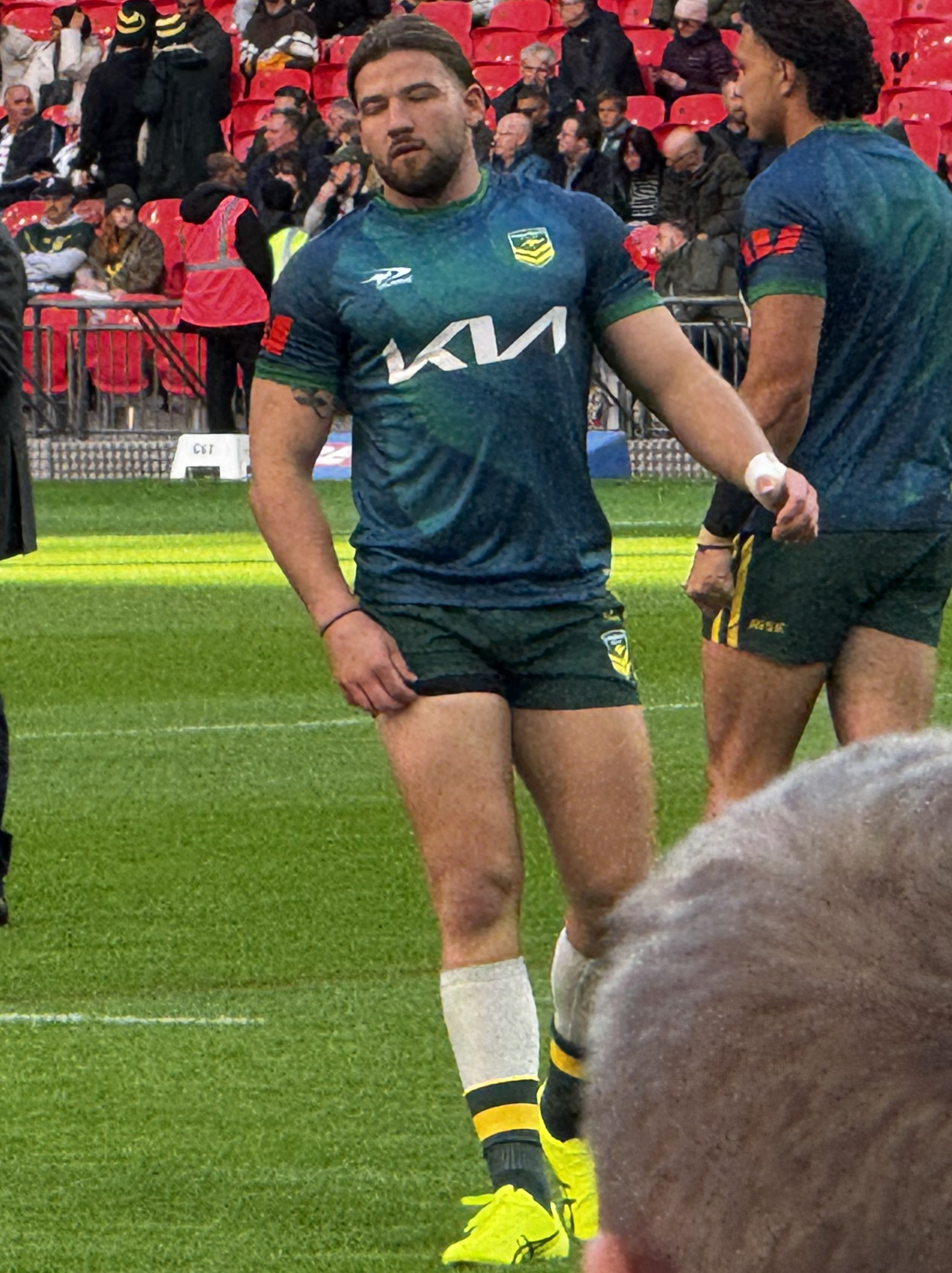

Personal information
- Full name: Patrick Carrigan
- Born: 1 January 1998 (age 28) Brisbane, Queensland, Australia
- Height: 190 cm (6 ft 3 in)
- Weight: 106 kg (16 st 10 lb)

Playing information
- Position: Lock, Prop
Club
Years	Team	Pld	T	G	FG	P
2019–	Brisbane Broncos	148	5	0	0	20
Representative
Years	Team	Pld	T	G	FG	P
2018	Queensland Residents	1	0	0	0	0
2022–26	Queensland	13	0	0	0	0
2022–26	Australia	19	0	0	0	0
- Source: As of 17 November 2026

Patrick Carrigan (born 1 January 1998) is an Australian professional rugby league footballer who plays as a ball-playing lock or prop for the Brisbane Broncos in the National Rugby League, with whom he won the 2025 NRL Grand Final. He also represents Australia at international level.

He has played at representative level for Queensland in State of Origin, winning the Wally Lewis Medal in 2022.

== Background ==
Carrigan was born in Brisbane, Queensland, Australia to parents from both Queensland and New South Wales. He attended St Laurence's College, South Brisbane from year 5 to 7 and he completed his schooling at St Joseph's College, Gregory Terrace in Brisbane where he was School Captain in 2015. There he played Rugby Union and captained their 1st XV. He was selected for Metropolitan North School Sports Rugby League in 2015.

Carrigan played his junior football for the Easts Tigers before being signed by the Brisbane Broncos.

A UQ Bachelor of Physiotherapy (Honours) student, he received a UQ Blue sporting honour in 2019, only the third Rugby League player to win this award since 1912.

Carrigan is eligible to play for the Ireland national rugby league team via the heritage rule. Efforts were made to recruit Carrigan for the 2021 Men's Rugby League World Cup with Carrigan ultimately being selected and playing for the Australia national rugby league team.

== Playing career ==
=== Early career ===
Carrigan played for the Brisbane Broncos in the Holden Cup from 2016 to 2017, winning the Broncos NYC U20s Player of The Year award both seasons, Broncos NYC U20s Best Forward in 2016 and Broncos NYC U20s Players' Player in 2017.

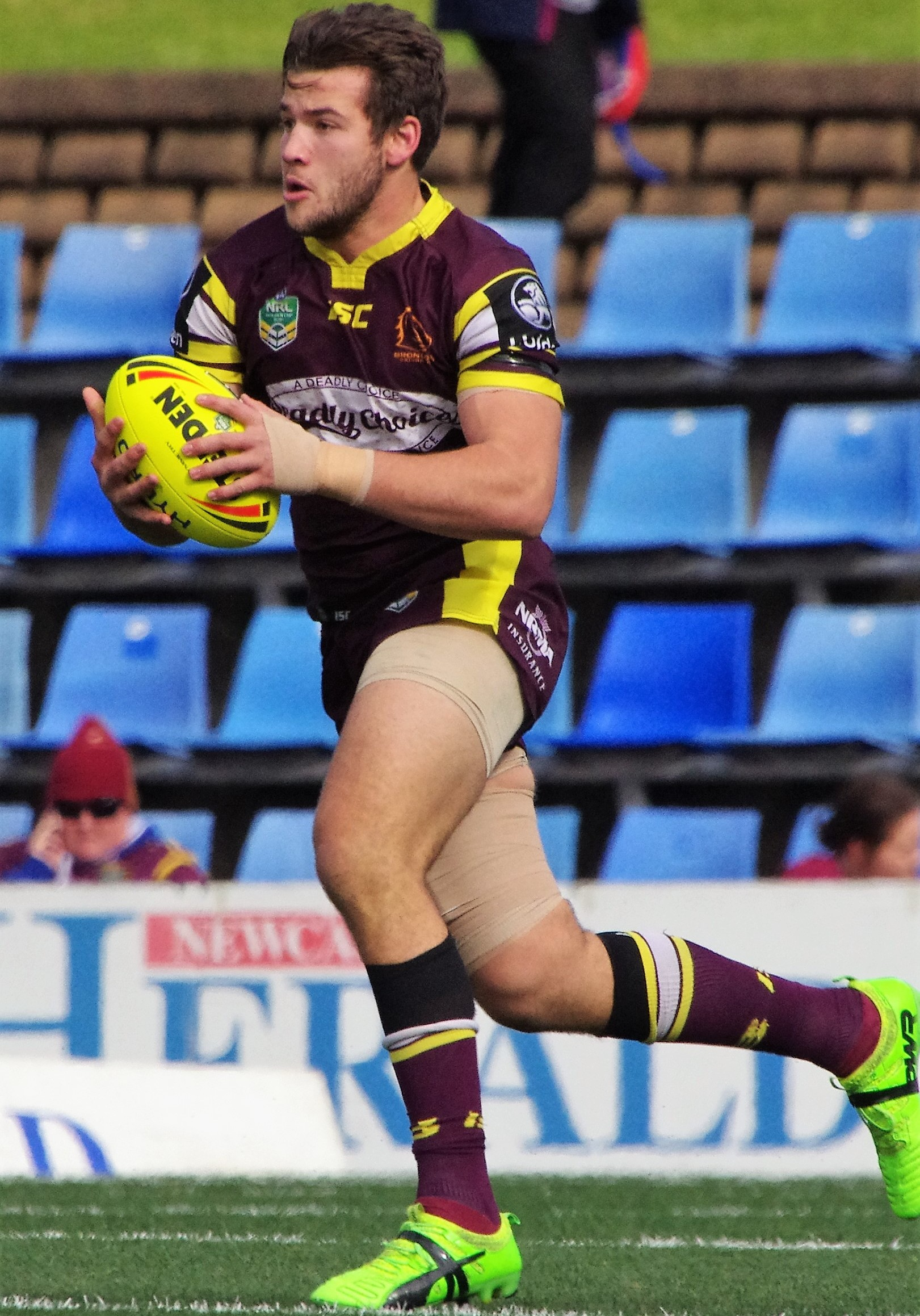
Carrigan playing for Brisbane in 2017

Carrigan was named in the 2017 NYC Team of The Year at prop.

Carrigan represented Queensland U18s in 2016 starting at prop and Queensland U20s in 2017 off the bench and captained the QLD U20s in 2018, starting at prop in QLDs first ever win in the U20s, winning 30 to 12 vs the NSW U20s.

In 2018 with the Holden Cup ceasing, Carrigan would continue to develop with the Wynnum Manly Seagulls in the Intrust Super Cup and would be rewarded with selection for the Junior Kangaroos, starting at prop in the 40-24 win over the Junior Kiwis.

=== 2019 ===
In Round 5, 2019 Carrigan made his NRL debut for the Brisbane Broncos against the Wests Tigers. Carrigan would finish the season with 19 games played and would be awarded a joint winner of the Broncos Rookie of The Year award alongside fellow Broncos U20s graduate Thomas Flegler.

=== 2020 ===
With regular captain Alex Glenn missing the start of the 2020 NRL season due to injury, Carrigan would co-captain Brisbane for the first two rounds of the 2020 NRL season alongside recruit Brodie Croft having only previously played 19 NRL games in his career.

Carrigan made 19 appearances for Brisbane captaining in 12 of those games in the 2020 NRL season as the club finished last on the table and claimed the wooden spoon for the first time in their history.

Carrigan would win both the Broncos Player of The Year & Players' Player awards alongside Payne Haas, while being the sole recipient of the Broncos Most Consistent award.

=== 2021 ===
In Round 9 of the 2021 NRL season, Carrigan suffered a season ending ACL injury during Brisbane's 19-18 loss against arch-rivals North Queensland.

=== 2022 ===
Returning from his ACL in Round 1, Carrigan would return finding career best form for a reborn Brisbane, helping return the club to the Top 4 mid-way through the competition, Carrigan would produce career best numbers to gain his maiden State of Origin jumper after just 8 games back. Carrigan played the first two games from the bench and the final game starting at lock. He became the first player in their debut series to win the Wally Lewis Medal.

Following Brisbane's shock loss against the Wests Tigers in round 20 of the 2022 NRL season, Carrigan was referred straight to the NRL judiciary after he performed a hip drop tackle on Wests Tigers Jackson Hastings which ended the players season. As a result of the tackle, Carrigan was suspended for four weeks.

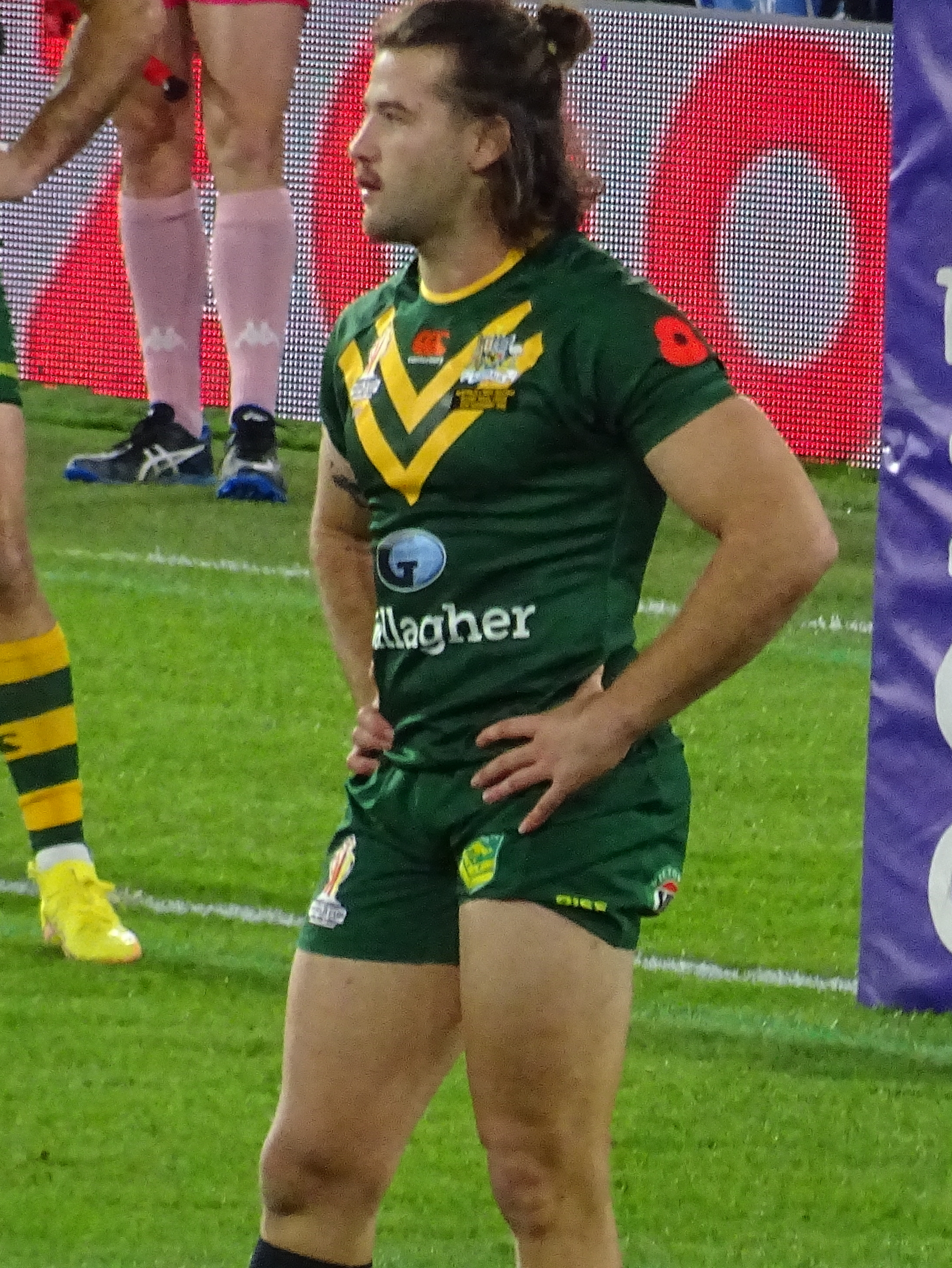
Carrigan playing for Australia in 2022

In October he was named in the Australia squad for the 2021 Rugby League World Cup. Carrigan played for Australia in their World Cup final victory over Samoa.

=== 2023 ===
Carrigan re-signed his contract with the club until at least the end of the 2028 season. In round 22 of the 2023 NRL season, Carrigan scored his first ever try in the NRL as Brisbane defeated the Sydney Roosters 32-10. Carrigan played 23 games for Brisbane in the 2023 NRL season. Carrigan played in Brisbane's 26-24 loss against Penrith in the 2023 NRL Grand Final.

=== 2024 ===
On 12 February, a video emerged of Carrigan and teammate Adam Reynolds being involved in a melee after the Brisbane club's annual fan day with one of the onlookers saying "let go of him... Adam... Pat... stop". It was alleged Reynolds had told Carrigan who was intoxicated to get a taxi and go home which started the fight. The Brisbane club then released a statement which read "The Broncos are looking into an incident involving some of its playing group in Brisbane City last night, The club was made aware of the incident last night and has been speaking to players across the course of the day to clarify details of what occurred.The NRL Integrity Unit has been informed of the matter." Carrigan played 22 games for Brisbane in the 2024 NRL season which saw the club miss the finals finishing 12th on the table.

=== 2025 ===
During Brisbane's Finals Week 1 clash against the Canberra Raiders, Carrigan was sin-binned in the 55th minute after a shoulder charge to the head of Morgan Smithies, coming shortly after teammate Reece Walsh was sin-binned for a headbutt. Carrigan received a one match ban, resulting in him missing Brisbane's Preliminary finals clash against the Penrith Panthers. Despite this, Brisbane would win both finals matches sending them to the 2025 NRL Grand Final.

Carrigan played 25 games for Brisbane in the 2025 NRL season including the clubs 2025 NRL Grand Final victory over Melbourne.

=== 2026 ===
On 19 February, Carrigan played in Brisbane's World Club Challenge loss against Hull Kingston Rovers. Carrigan played 14 games for Brisbane in the 2026 NRL season as the club finished 14th on the table.

== Statistics ==
Year	Team	Games	Tries	Pts
2019	Brisbane Broncos	19		
2020	Brisbane Broncos	19		
2021	Brisbane Broncos	8		
2022	Brisbane Broncos	14		
2023	Brisbane Broncos	23	2	8
2024	Brisbane Broncos	22	2	4
2025	Brisbane Broncos	25		
2026	Brisbane Broncos	18	1	4
2027	Brisbane Broncos			
	Totals	148	5	20

== Honours ==
Individual

- Brisbane Broncos U20s Player Of The Year: 2016, 2017
- Brisbane Broncos U20s Players' Player: 2017
- Holden Cup Team Of The Year: 2017
- Brisbane Broncos Rookie Of The Year: 2019
- Brisbane Broncos Players' Player: 2020, 2024, 2026
- Brisbane Broncos Most Consistent: 2020, 2022, 2025
- Brisbane Broncos Player Of The Year: 2020, 2024
- Brisbane Broncos Community Service Award: 2022, 2023
- Wally Lewis Medal: 2022
- Ron McAuliffe Medal: 2022
- Dally M Lock Of The Year: 2023
- Carl Webb Medal: 2024
- Battle Medal: 2026

Club

- NRL Grand Finalist: 2023, 2025
- NRL Pre-Season Challenge: 2024, 2025
- NRL Premiership: 2025

Representative

- Rugby League World Cup Champion: 2021, 2026
- State Of Origin Series Winner: 2022, 2023, 2025
- Rugby League Pacific Championship Winner: 2024
- Ashes Test Series Winner: 2025
