= Battle of Brisbane (disambiguation) =

The Battle of Brisbane was a riot in Brisbane, Queensland between United States military personnel and Australian servicemen and civilians.

Battle of Brisbane may also refer to:

- "Battle of Brisbane" (song), song from The Pogues album Red Roses for Me
- Battle of Brisbane (boxing match), alternative name for boxing match Manny Pacquiao vs. Jeff Horn
- Battle of Brisbane (1932 rugby league match), the second rugby league test match between Australia and England in 1932
- The Battle for Brisbane is the name given to the local derby between the Brisbane Broncos and the Dolphins, the two National Rugby League sides based in Brisbane, beginning with the Dolphins' NRL debut in 2023
