= Brisbane Broncos honours =

Rugby league team honours

Honours won by the Brisbane Broncos include two New South Wales Rugby League Premierships, four National Rugby League Premierships, one Super League and two World Club Challenge titles. The club has also won one Panasonic Cup (1989), two Toohey's Challenge Cup trophies (91 & 95) and two NRL Pre-Season Challenges (24 & 25). The Women's side has also won the NRLW Premiership on four occasions.

== Team honours ==
=== Premierships (7/35) ===
Year	Opponent	League	Score	Venue	Attendance
1992	St. George Dragons	New South Wales Rugby League	28–8	Sydney Football Stadium	41,560
1993	St. George Dragons	New South Wales Rugby League	14–6	Sydney Football Stadium	42,329
1997	Cronulla-Sutherland Sharks	Super League (Australia)	26–8	ANZ Stadium (Brisbane)	58,912
1998	Canterbury Bulldogs	National Rugby League	38–8	Sydney Football Stadium	40,857
2000	Sydney Roosters	National Rugby League	14–6	Stadium Australia	94,277
2006	Melbourne Storm	National Rugby League	15–8	ANZ Stadium (Sydney)	79,609
2025	Melbourne Storm	National Rugby League	26–22	Accor Stadium (Sydney)	80,223

=== Runners-up (2/35) ===
Year	Opponent	League	Score	Venue	Attendance
2015	North Queensland Cowboys	National Rugby League	16–17	ANZ Stadium (Sydney)	82,758
2023	Penrith Panthers	National Rugby League	26-24	ANZ Stadium (Sydney)	81,947

=== Minor Premierships (4/35) ===
Year	Competition	Wins
1992	Winfield Cup	18
1997	Super League Telstra Cup	14
1998	National Rugby League	18
2000	National Rugby League	18

=== World Club Challenges (2/5) ===
Year	Opponent	Result	Score	Venue	Attendance
1992	Wigan	Win	22–8	Central Park (Wigan)	17,764
1994	Wigan	Loss	14–20	ANZ Stadium (Brisbane)	54,220
1997	Hunter Mariners	Win	36–12	Ericsson Stadium (Auckland)	10,300
2001	St Helens	Loss	18–20	Reebok Stadium (Bolton)	16,041
2007	St Helens	Loss	14–18	Reebok Stadium (Bolton)	23,207

=== Finals (28/35) ===
The Broncos qualified for the NSWRL/ARL/SL/NRL finals in the following years.
28 (1990, 1992, 1993, 1994, 1995, 1996, 1997, 1998, 1999, 2000, 2001, 2002, 2003, 2004, 2005, 2006, 2007, 2008, 2009, 2011, 2012, 2014, 2015, 2016, 2017, 2018, 2019, 2023)

== Individual honours ==
=== Rothmans Medal ===
The Rothmans Medal is awarded to Player of the Year from the years 1968–1996.

Winner	Year
Allan Langer	1992

=== Dally M. Medal ===
The Dally M. Medal is a different system to Player of the Year. It started in 1980 and became the official award of the NRL in 1998

Winner (Men's)	Year
Allan Langer	1996

Winner (Women's)	Year
Brittany Breayley	2018
Ali Brigginshaw	2020
Millie Elliott	2021
Tamika Upton	2025

=== Clive Churchill Medal ===
The Clive Churchill Medal is awarded to the Player of the Match in an NRL grand final.

Winner	Year
Allan Langer	1992
Gorden Tallis	1998
Darren Lockyer	2000
Shaun Berrigan	2006
Reece Walsh	2025

- Steve Renouf was awarded Man of the Match in the 1997 Super League grand final.

=== Karyn Murphy Medal ===
The Karyn Murphy Medal is awarded to the Player of the Match in an NRLW grand final.

Winner	Year
Kimiora Breayley-Nati	2018
Anette Brander	2019
Amber Hall	2020
Mele Hufanga	2025

== Club awards (NRL) ==
Each year the Paul Morgan Medal is awarded to the Broncos' best and fairest player of the season.

Player of Year
Year	Player of Year
1988	Allan Langer
1989	Greg Dowling
1990	Kevin Walters
1991	Trevor Gillmeister
1992	Kerrod Walters
1993	Allan Langer
1994	Allan Langer
1995	Allan Langer
1996	Allan Langer
1997	Peter Ryan
1998	Andrew Gee
1999	Gorden Tallis
2000	Wendell Sailor
2001	Shane Webcke
2002	Darren Lockyer
2003	Darren Lockyer
2004	Petero Civoniceva
2005	Shane Webcke
2006	Petero Civoniceva
2007	Petero Civoniceva
2008	Sam Thaiday
2009	Corey Parker
2010	Josh Hoffman
2011	Darren Lockyer
2012	Andrew McCullough
2013	Corey Parker
2014	Ben Hunt
2015	Corey Parker
2016	Darius Boyd
2017	Andrew McCullough
2018	Anthony Milford
2019	Payne Haas
2020	Payne Haas Patrick Carrigan
2021	Payne Haas
2022	Payne Haas
2023	Payne Haas
2024	Patrick Carrigan
2025	Payne Haas
2026	Xavier Willison

Clubperson (ex. Clubman) of Year
Year	Clubperson of Year
1988	Greg Conescu
1989	Tony Currie
1990	Ray Hearing
1991	Andrew Gee
1992	Allan Langer
1993	Chris Johns
1994	John Plath
1995	Chris Johns
1996	Chris Johns/Gorden Tallis
1997	Tony Spencer
1998	Brett Green
1999	John Plath
2000	Michael Hancock
2001	Ben Ikin
2002	Scott Prince
2003	Graham McColm
2004	Gorden Tallis
2005	Tony Duggan
2006	Andrew Gee
2007	Petero Civoniceva/Brad Thorn
2008	Matthew Middleton
2009	Nick Kenny
2010	Marty Rowen
2011	Kurt Richards
2012	Jess West/Terry Gray
2013	Jharal Yow Yeh
2014	Scot Czislowski
2015	Justin Hodges
2016	Lachlan Maranta
2017	Tristan Croll
2018	Adam Walsh
2019	Lachlan Maranta
2020	Gina Malcolm
2021	Eloise Kelly Dave Ballard
2022	Adam Reynolds
2023	Simon Scanlan
2024	Shantelle Page Belinda Findlay
2025	Delouise Hoeter
2026	Corey Jensen

Rookie of Year
Year	Rookie of Year
1988	Shane Duffy & Kerrod Walters
1989	Michael Hancock
1990	Paul Hauff & Willie Carne
1991	Julian O'Neill
1992	Brett Galea
1993	Wendell Sailor
1994	Brad Thorn/John Driscoll
1995	Darren Lockyer
1996	Tonie Carroll
1997	Michael De Vere
1998	Petero Civoniceva
1999	Lote Tuqiri
2000	Dane Carlaw
2001	Carl Webb
2002	Brent Tate
2003	Neville Costigan
2004	Karmichael Hunt
2005	Leon Bott
2006	Darius Boyd
2007	Dave Taylor
2008	Denan Kemp
2009	Andrew McCullough
2010	Matt Gillett
2011	Jack Reed
2012	Lachlan Maranta
2013	Corey Oates
2014	N/A
2015	Kodi Nikorima
2016	Tom Opacic
2017	Andrew McCullough
2018	Jamayne Isaako
2019	Thomas Flegler Patrick Carrigan
2020	Herbie Farnworth
2021	Kobe Hetherington
2022	Ezra Mam
2023	Tristan Sailor
2024	Blake Mozer
2025	Ben Talty
2026	Va'a Semu

Best Back
Year	Best Back
1988	Wally Lewis
1989	Tony Currie
1990	Kevin Walters
1991	Allan Langer
1992	Allan Langer
1993	Willie Carne
1994	Michael Hancock
1995	Allan Langer
1996	Allan Langer
1997	Kevin Walters
1998	Kevin Walters
1999	Wendell Sailor
2000	Wendell Sailor
2001	Darren Lockyer
2002	Darren Lockyer
2003	Darren Lockyer
2004	Shaun Berrigan
2005	Justin Hodges
2006	Darren Lockyer
2007	Karmichael Hunt
2008	Karmichael Hunt
2009	Justin Hodges
2010	Israel Folau
2011	Darren Lockyer
2012	Justin Hodges
2013	Josh Hoffman
2014	Ben Hunt
2015	Ben Hunt
2016	Darius Boyd
2017	Darius Boyd
2018	Corey Oates
2019	Kotoni Staggs
2020	Kotoni Staggs
2021	Herbie Farnworth
2022	Adam Reynolds
2023	Reece Walsh
2024	Kotoni Staggs
2025	Reece Walsh & Kotoni Staggs
2026	Deine Mariner

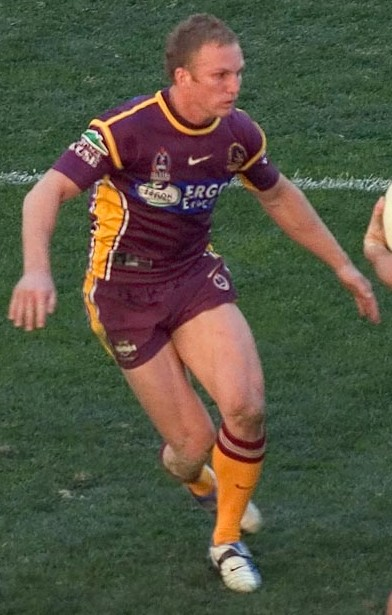
Darren Lockyer playing for the Broncos in 2004. Lockyer has won numerous awards for the Broncos since his debut in 1995 and retired as captain in 2011. He holds the record for most NRL games by any club player.

Best Forward
Year	Best Forward
1988	Terry Matterson
1989	Greg Dowling
1990	Gene Miles
1991	Andrew Gee
1992	Trevor Gillmeister
1993	Kerrod Walters
1994	Andrew Gee
1995	Glenn Lazarus
1996	Peter Ryan
1997	Brad Thorn
1998	Shane Webcke
1999	Gorden Tallis
2000	Brad Thorn
2001	Shane Webcke
2002	Shane Webcke
2003	Shane Webcke
2004	Petero Civoniceva
2005	Petero Civoniceva
2006	Brad Thorn
2007	Petero Civoniceva
2008	Sam Thaiday
2009	Sam Thaiday
2010	Sam Thaiday
2011	Corey Parker
2012	Alex Glenn
2013	Corey Parker
2014	Josh McGuire
2015	Sam Thaiday
2016	Sam Thaiday
2017	Matt Gillett
2018	Matt Lodge
2019	Matt Lodge
2020	Payne Haas
2021	Payne Haas
2022	Payne Haas
2022	Payne Haas
2023	Payne Haas
2024	Patrick Carrigan
2025	Payne Haas
2026	Xavier Willison

Most Consistent
Year	Player
2004	Tonie Carroll
2005	Brad Thorn
2006	Justin Hodges
2007	Corey Parker
2008	Michael Ennis
2009	Peter Wallace
2010	Corey Parker
2011	Alex Glenn
2012	Josh McGuire
2013	Corey Parker
2014	Alex Glenn
2015	Andrew McCullough
2016	Matt Gillett
2017	Alex Glenn
2018	Alex Glenn
2019	Alex Glenn
2020	Patrick Carrigan
2021	Jake Turpin
2022	Patrick Carrigan
2023	Payne Haas
2024	Corey Jensen
2025	Patrick Carrigan
2026	Jordan Riki

Player's Player
Year	Player
2004	Petero Civoniceva
2005	Shane Webcke
2006	Shane Webcke
2007	Petero Civoniceva
2008	Sam Thaiday
2009	Karmichael Hunt
2010	Josh Hoffman
2011	Corey Parker
2012	Corey Parker
2013	Corey Parker
2014	Ben Hunt
2015	Anthony Milford
2016	Anthony Milford
2017	Andrew McCullough Josh McGuire
2018	Joe Ofahengaue
2019	Payne Haas
2020	Patrick Carrigan Payne Haas
2021	Payne Haas
2022	Corey Oates
2023	Payne Haas
2024	Patrick Carrigan
2025	Payne Haas
2026	Patrick Carrigan

Play of the Year
Year	Player
2006	Darren Lockyer – Wests Tigers in Round 21.
2007	Darren Lockyer
2008	Darren Lockyer and Denan Kemp (80th minute try, Round 12)
2009	Dave Taylor (80th minute try, Round 23)
2010	Antonio Winterstein
2011	Matt Gillett
2012	Josh Hoffman
2013	Jack Reed try against the Tigers in Round 14
2014	Ben Barba try against the Bulldogs in Round 22
2015	Lachlan Maranta try against the Raiders in Round 12
2016	Nine player try against Bulldogs, Round 24
2017	Matt Gillett for his charge down that lead to a try against the Titans, Round 7
2019	Jake Turpin and Tevita Pangai Jr try against Cronulla, Round 16
2020	Kotoni Staggs fend against the Dragons in Round 15
2021	Payne Haas try saver against Cronulla, Round 16
2022	Kurt Capewell field goal against Souths, Round 1
2023	Kotoni Staggs length of the field try against Redcliffe, Round 4
2024	Jesse Arthars try against Melbourne, Round 5
2025	Ben Hunt field goal against Raiders, Finals week 1
2026	Deine Mariner try saving tackle against Penrith, Round 20

== Club awards (NRLW) ==
NRLW Player of the Year
Year	Player
2018	Brittany Breayley
2019	Ali Brigginshaw
2020	Amber Hall
2021	Millie Elliott
2022	Jamie Chapman
2023	Mariah Denman
2024	Julia Robinson
2025	Tamika Upton
2026	Tamika Upton

== Captains & Coaches ==
Coaches
Year	Coach
1988–2008	Wayne Bennett
2009–2011	Ivan Henjak
2011–2014	Anthony Griffin
2015–2018	Wayne Bennett
2019–2020	Anthony Seibold
2021–2024	Kevin Walters
2025–present	Michael Maguire

Captains
Year	Captain
1988–1989	Wally Lewis
1990–1991	Gene Miles
1992–1999	Allan Langer
1999–2000	Kevin Walters
2001–2004	Gorden Tallis
2005–2011	Darren Lockyer
2012–2013	Sam Thaiday
2014–2016	Corey Parker
2014–2015	Justin Hodges
2017–2019	Darius Boyd
2020–2021	Alex Glenn
2022–	Adam Reynolds

== Famous fans ==
- Peter Beattie, a former Queensland Premier, chairman of the Australian Rugby League Commission.
- Steve Irwin (since deceased), a crocodile hunter
- Sally Pearson, an Australia athlete,
- Lachlan Murdoch, a businessman and a former No. 1 ticket holder
- Susie O'Neill
- Pat Rafter, a retired Australian tennis player
- Kevin Rudd, a former Australian Prime Minister and the current No. 1 ticket holder
- Jim Soorley, a former Lord Mayor of Brisbane and a former No. 1 ticket holder
- Andrew Symonds, an Australian and Queensland cricketer
- Patty Mills. NBA and Australian Boomer Basketball player
- Cam Smith, LIV Golfer

== National Youth Competition honours ==
The Broncos were runners up in the 2008 & 2014 NYC grand finals.

Brisbane also produced three NYC Players of the Year: Ben Hunt (2008), Tariq Sims (2010) and Ashley Taylor (2015).
