= Sunshine Showdown (rugby league) =

Rugby league contests

- Location: South-East Queensland
- Teams: Gold Coast Titans; Dolphins
- First meeting: Dolphins 28 – 26 Titans (23 April 2023)
- Latest meeting: Dolphins 24 – 20 Titans (4 September 2026)
- Stadiums: Suncorp Stadium; Cbus Super Stadium

Statistics
- Total meetings: 8
- Most wins: Dolphins (7)
- Top scorer: Jamayne Isaako (28)
- All-time series: Dolphins: 7 wins Titans: 1 win
- Largest victory: Dolphins – 26 points (5 April 2025)

The Sunshine Showdown the name given to regular season rugby league matches between the Gold Coast Titans and the Dolphins, since the latter side first entered the National Rugby League (NRL) in 2023.

Both teams are based in South-East Queensland, Australia, with the Dolphins headquartered in Redcliffe, playing their home games in Suncorp Stadium, Brisbane, as well as Kayo Stadium, although they have only hosted the Titans at Suncorp Stadium. The name of the event reflects the nickname of Queensland as the "Sunshine State".

The other NRL side based in South-East Queensland, the Brisbane Broncos, play the Dolphins and the Titans in the Battle for Brisbane and the Macca's Local Derby respectively.

Out of the eight times the two teams have faced each other in the NRL the Titans have won only once, at Suncorp Stadium on 28 July 2024.

Game	Home	Score	Away	Date	Round	Venue	Referee	Attendance
1	Dolphins	28–26	Gold Coast Titans	23 April 2023	Round 8	Suncorp Stadium	Chris Butler	22,034
2	Gold Coast Titans	23–21	Dolphins	9 July 2023	Round 19	Cbus Stadium	Grant Atkins	18,335
3	Gold Coast Titans	30–14	Dolphins	30 March 2024	Round 4	Cbus Stadium	Belinda Sharpe	13,898
4	Dolphins	21–14	Gold Coast Titans	28 July 2024	Round 21	Suncorp Stadium	Todd Smith	19,533
5	Gold Coast Titans	36–10	Dolphins	5 April 2025	Round 5	Cbus Stadium	Wyatt Raymond	15,798
6	Dolphins	36–30	Gold Coast Titans	31 August 2025	Round 26	Suncorp Stadium	Grant Atkins	19,305
7	Dolphins	18–14	Gold Coast Titans	15 March 2026	Round 2	Suncorp Stadium	Liam Kennedy	16,073
8	Gold Coast Titans	24–20	Dolphins	4 September 2026	Round 27	Cbus Stadium	Wyatt Raymond	17,053

== See also ==
- Rivalries in the National Rugby League
