= Klese Haas =

Philippine international rugby league footballer

Personal information
- Born: 2 March 2002 (age 24) Sydney, New South Wales, Australia
- Height: 185 cm (6 ft 1 in)
- Weight: 104 kg (16 st 5 lb)

Playing information
- Position: Second-row, Lock, Prop
Club
Years	Team	Pld	T	G	FG	P
2022–	Gold Coast Titans	83	6	0	0	24
Representative
Years	Team	Pld	T	G	FG	P
2019–22	Philippines	2	0	0	0	0
- Source: As of 4 September 2026
- Education: Keebra Park State High School
- Relatives: Payne Haas (brother); Mark Taufua (uncle)

Klese Haas (born 2 March 2002) is a Philippines international rugby league footballer who plays as a second-row forward for the Gold Coast Titans in the National Rugby League (NRL).

== Background ==
Haas's older brother Payne Haas plays for the Brisbane Broncos. He is also the nephew of former Newcastle forward Mark Taufua. He is of Samoan, Swiss and Filipino descent.

Born in Sydney, and raised in Newcastle, New South Wales, Haas moved to the Gold Coast, Queensland at 10 years old. Haas played his junior rugby league for Nerang Roosters and attended Keebra Park State High School.

== Playing career ==
In round 24 of the 2022 NRL season, Haas made his first-grade debut for the Gold Coast against the Newcastle Knights. Haas played a total of 15 games for the Gold Coast in the 2023 NRL season as the club finished 14th on the table.

=== 2024 ===
Haas made 22 appearances for the Gold Coast throughout the 2024 NRL season as the club again finished 14th on the table. On 7 October 2024, the Gold Coast confirmed Haas had re-signed with the club on a three-year deal.

=== 2025 ===
Haas played 21 matches for the Gold Coast in the 2025 NRL season as the club narrowly avoided the wooden spoon finishing 16th.

=== 2026 ===
On 24 June 2026, the Gold Coast Titans announced that Haas had re-signed with the club until the end of 2029. Haas played over 20 matches for the Gold Coast in the 2026 NRL season as the club finished 16th on the table.

== Statistics ==
Year	Team	Games	Tries	Pts
2022	Gold Coast Titans	2	-	-
2023	Gold Coast Titans	15	3	12
2024	Gold Coast Titans	22	3	12
2025	Gold Coast Titans	21	-	-
2026	Gold Coast Titans	23	-	-
	Totals	83	6	24
