= Battle for Brisbane (rugby league) =

Rugby league contests

- Other names: Battle of Brisbane
- Location: Brisbane, Queensland
- Teams: Brisbane Broncos; Dolphins; South Queensland Crushers (former)
- First meeting: Broncos 32 – 0 Crushers (31 March 1995)
- Latest meeting: Dolphins 40 – 32 Broncos (8 August 2026)
- Next meeting: 2027
- Stadiums: Suncorp Stadium; The Gabba

Statistics
- Total meetings: 10
- Most wins: Broncos (8)
- Top scorer: Jamayne Isaako (70)
- All-time series: Broncos: 8 wins Dolphins: 2 wins Crushers: 0 wins
- Largest victory: Dolphins – 34 points (31 August 2024)

The rugby league Battle for Brisbane is the name for the series of matches between the professional rugby league clubs in Brisbane.

The original series was between the Brisbane Broncos and the South Queensland Crushers during the ARL competition in the mid-1990s; the Brisbane Broncos won both encounters.

In 2023, the new Dolphins franchise re-ignited the series, with the teams striking a new Battle Medal as the player of the match award, as decided by prominent rugby league commentators.

== Results ==
=== Broncos vs Crushers ===
The Brisbane Broncos would meet the South Queensland Crushers just twice in the then ARL-controlled competition. The first meeting at Brisbane's ANZ Stadium came on the night the Super League war broke out in 1995. The long-awaited clash between Brisbane's two teams ended up a bit of a non-event, with the Broncos having a glut of possession to race out to an early 12–0 lead, extending it further in the second half. The Crushers lack of penetration in attack was their ultimate downfall, as they were held scoreless in just their fourth competition fixture.

The second match between the teams came over a year later in the 1996 ARL season, with the Broncos again winners, in front of a then competition record crowd of 34,263 at Suncorp Stadium. The Crushers would take an 8–6 lead into halftime, before the Broncos overwhelmed the Crushers in the final ten minutes with three tries.

Due to the split caused by the Super League war, the two teams would not meet again before the Crushers' ultimate demise in December 1997.

Game	Home	Score	Away	Date	Venue	Crowd
1	Brisbane Broncos	32–0	South Queensland Crushers	31 March 1995	QE II	49,607
2	South Queensland Crushers	8–28	Brisbane Broncos	12 April 1996	Lang Park	34,263

=== Records ===
==== Team ====
Most consecutive wins: 2 ( Broncos)

Biggest win: 32-0 ( Broncos)

==== Individual ====
Most points: 12 - Willie Carne ( Broncos)

Most Tries: 2 - Michael Hancock ( Broncos)

Most Goals: 4 - Julian O'Neill & Willie Carne ( Broncos)

=== Broncos vs Dolphins ===
It would take almost 27 years before the next battle for Brisbane when the Dolphins were introduced in 2023. Inaugural Broncos coach Wayne Bennett returned to Queensland as the Phins first coach and led them into their first battle with an undefeated record. Featuring 7 former Broncos the Dolphins ultimately went down 18-12. Kotoni Staggs scored the match sealer in the 77th minute and celebrated by pointing to the turf while screaming "Our f***ing home!".

The next battle would be held at the Gabba due to the 2023 Womens World Cup where the Broncos won again 24-16, Selwyn Cobbo scoring the rivalries first hat-trick. Cobbo then became the first back to back Battle Medalist with another man of the match performance in 2024 when Brisbane won 28-14 in Round 6.

It took until the fourth edition for the Dolphins to register their first win, running away with a record 34 point margin and all but ending the Broncos chances of playing finals in 2024. Former Bronco Herbie Farnworth won man of the match with two tries.

However Brisbane sought revenge in 2025, winning both battles on their way to an NRL Premiership before beating the Dolphins again in Round 4, 2026. The men from Redcliffe regrouped to win their second battle later in 2026, coming back from 24 points down to win 40-32, inflicting the Broncos' worst ever collapse and sealing their first finals appearance.

Game	Home	Score	Away	Date	Round	Venue	Referee	Attendance	Battle Medal
1	Dolphins	12–18	Brisbane Broncos	24 March 2023	Round 4	Suncorp Stadium	Adam Gee	51,047	Payne Haas
2	Brisbane Broncos	24–16	Dolphins	1 July 2023	Round 18	The Gabba	Peter Gough	30,606	Selwyn Cobbo
3	Brisbane Broncos	28–14	Dolphins	12 April 2024	Round 6	Suncorp Stadium	Adam Gee	46,224	Selwyn Cobbo
4	Dolphins	40–6	Brisbane Broncos	31 August 2024	Round 26	Suncorp Stadium	Adam Gee	50,049	Herbie Farnworth
5	Dolphins	12–20	Brisbane Broncos	28 March 2025	Round 4	Suncorp Stadium	Gerard Sutton	44,278	Gehamat Shibasaki
6	Brisbane Broncos	38–28	Dolphins	16 August 2025	Round 24	Suncorp Stadium	Wyatt Raymond	44,350	Reece Walsh
7	Brisbane Broncos	26–12	Dolphins	27 March 2026	Round 4	Suncorp Stadium	Ashley Klein	45,882	Pat Carrigan
8	Dolphins	40–32	Brisbane Broncos	8 August 2026	Round 23	Suncorp Stadium	Todd Smith	50,188	Hamiso Tabuai-Fidow

=== Records ===
==== Team ====
Most consecutive wins: 3 ( Broncos)

Biggest win: 40-6 ( Dolphins)

Biggest comeback win: 24 points ( Dolphins: Round 23 2026, trailed 24-nil - won 40-32)

==== Individual ====
Most points: 70 - Jamayne Isaako ( Dolphins)

Most Tries: 7 - Selwyn Cobbo ( Broncos & Dolphins)

Most Goals: 27 - Jamayne Isaako ( Dolphins)

Most points in a single game: 18 - Reece Walsh (Round 24, 2025) ( Broncos)

Most Appearances: 8 - Jamayne Isaako ( Dolphins) & Kotoni Staggs ( Broncos)

Most Battle Medals: 2 - Selwyn Cobbo ( Broncos)

==== Players who have played on both sides of the battle ====
-Herbie Farnworth (2: Broncos, 4: Dolphins)

-Selwyn Cobbo (5: Broncos, 2: Dolphins)

-Thomas Flegler (1: Broncos, 2: Dolphins)

-Aublix Tawha (1 : Dolphins , 1: Broncos)

== See also ==
- Sunshine Showdown
- Rivalries in the National Rugby League
