= Reece Walsh =

Australia international rugby league footballer

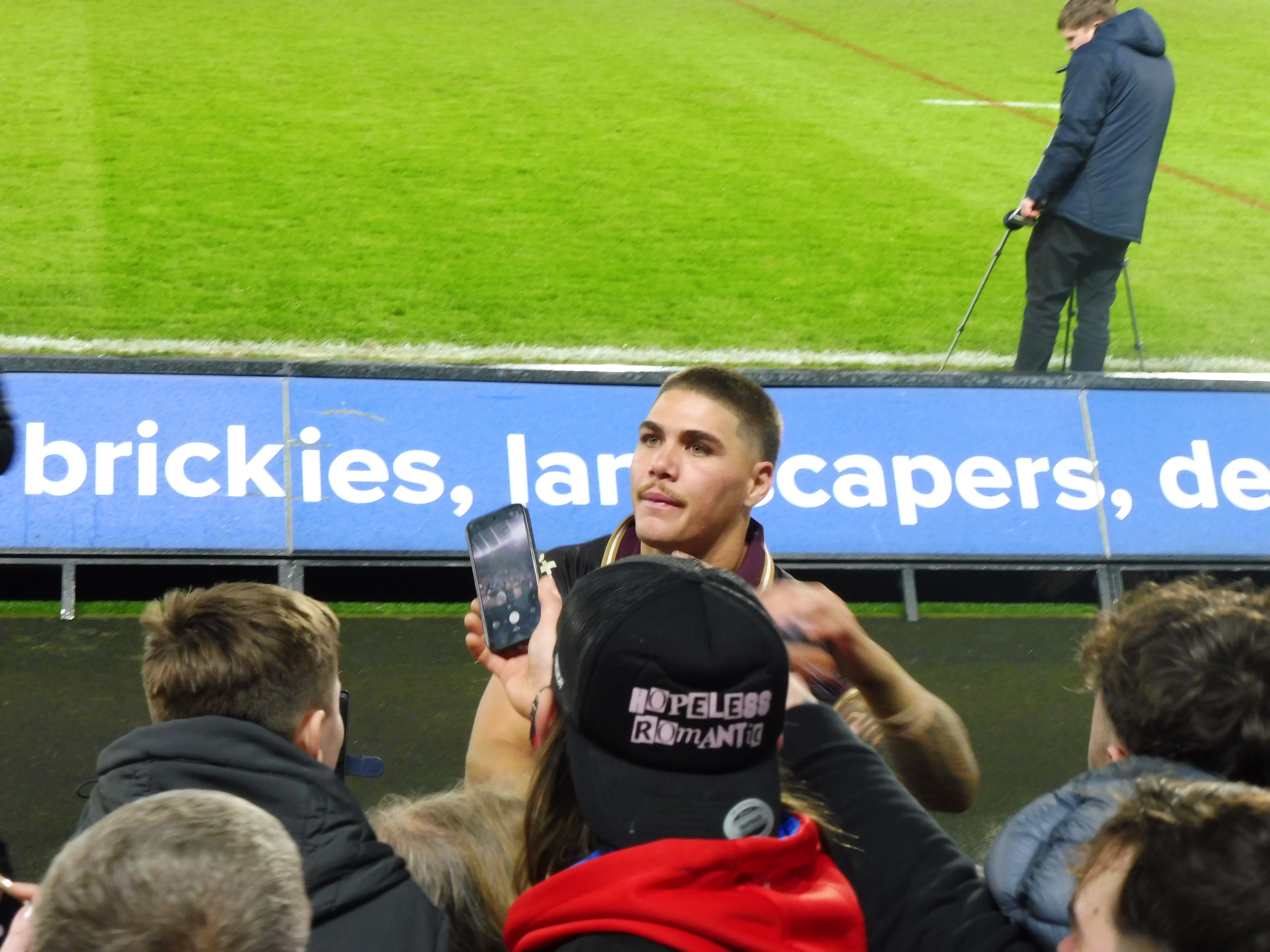

Personal information
- Full name: Reece Rodney Walsh
- Born: 10 July 2002 (age 24) Southport, Queensland, Australia
- Height: 177 cm (5 ft 10 in)
- Weight: 88 kg (13 st 12 lb)

Playing information
- Position: Fullback
Club
Years	Team	Pld	T	G	FG	P
2021–22	New Zealand Warriors	38	11	69	0	182
2023–	Brisbane Broncos	73	43	67	1	307
	Total	111	54	136	1	489
Representative
Years	Team	Pld	T	G	FG	P
2023–26	Queensland	6	0	0	0	0
2025–26	Australia	7	9	5	0	46
- Source: As of 17 November 2026

Reece Walsh (born 10 July 2002) is an Australian professional rugby league footballer who plays as a fullback for the Brisbane Broncos in the NRL. He has also represented Queensland in the State of Origin series, and Australia at international level.

== Background ==
Walsh was born in Southport, a suburb of the Gold Coast, Queensland, to an Indigenous Australian father, and a Māori mother from Hastings, New Zealand. He was raised by his father and stepmother in the Gold Coast suburb of Nerang, and grew up playing junior rugby league for the Nerang Roosters. He attended Keebra Park State High School throughout his teenage years before being signed by the Brisbane Broncos.

== Playing career ==
=== Early career ===
In 2018, Walsh represented the Queensland Murri under-16 and Queensland under-16 sides. In 2019, he played for the Tweed Heads Seagulls in their National Under-18 Title and Mal Meninga Cup-winning sides while he also spent the year training with the Brisbane Broncos NRL squad. In June 2019, he represented Queensland under-18, scoring a try in their 34–12 win over New South Wales. In September 2019, he represented the Australian Schoolboys, scoring a try in their 36–20 win over the Junior Kiwis.

=== 2021 ===
In 2021, Walsh joined the Brisbane Broncos NRL squad on a development contract. He began the season playing for the Norths Devils in the Queensland Cup.

On 18 March, Walsh signed a three-year contract with the New Zealand Warriors, beginning in 2022. On 10 April, he was released early from his Brisbane contract to join the Warriors immediately.

On 25 April, in round 7 of the 2021 NRL season, Walsh made his first grade debut for the Warriors against Melbourne.

In May, Walsh confirmed his allegiance to Queensland and Australia over New Zealand. It was confirmed on 21 June that he had been selected to play as fullback for the Queensland Maroons for the second game of the State of Origin series. At 18, he would have been the youngest player to be selected in the Queensland team since Ben Ikin in 1995, however he was ruled out due to an injury.

In round 23, Walsh had a disappointing afternoon with the goal kicking duties only managing to convert one goal from five attempts, including a conversion attempt near the touch-line late in the game which would likely have sent the game against Brisbane into extra-time. New Zealand lost the match 24-22 which effectively ended their already slim chance of reaching the finals.

==== Cocaine possession ====
On 25 September 2021, a video emerged of Walsh being arrested by police at a Surfers Paradise nightclub. He was charged with possession of cocaine. He was handed a $5000 fine and suspended for two matches over the incident.

=== 2022 ===
On 20 June, Walsh was selected in the extended Queensland Maroons squad for State of Origin Game 2, however did not play. On 6 July, Walsh was granted an early release from his New Zealand contract to re-join his former club Brisbane starting in 2023. Walsh cited a relationship breakdown as the reason for the move. He had also reportedly turned down a $2.8 million offer from new NRL franchise The Dolphins in favour of signing with Brisbane. On 7 July, Brisbane officially announced his return to the club, on a three-year deal.

=== 2023 ===
On 1 January, it was reported that Walsh became involved in a verbal altercation with Gold Coast player David Fifita. The pair needed to be separated by security staff at Burleigh Heads. In the pre-season trials, Walsh suffered a facial injury in Brisbane's match against the Gold Coast and was ruled out for an indefinite period.

In round 2 of the 2023 NRL season, Walsh made his club debut for Brisbane and scored a try in their 28–16 victory over arch-rivals North Queensland.

The following week, he scored two tries in a 40–18 victory over St. George Illawarra. After a series of good performances, Walsh was selected to make his debut for Queensland in game one of the 2023 State of Origin series, replacing incumbent fullback Kalyn Ponga. Walsh was involved in an altercation with New South Wales five-eighth Jarome Luai in the final minutes of game two of the State of Origin series, resulting in both players being sent off and New South Wales winger Josh Addo-Carr being sin-binned. Queensland won the game 32–6, and henceforth the series.

In June 2023, Walsh was suspended for three matches for contrary conduct towards a match official, after saying "What the fuck do you mean, cunt?" directly after referee Chris Butler blew an obstruction penalty in the Broncos' round 17 loss to the Gold Coast Titans. Walsh claimed this was aimed at teammate Patrick Carrigan. As a result of the suspension, Walsh missed the third State of Origin match.

On 29 September, the NRL integrity unit were reportedly investigating Walsh for a verbal altercation he had with a Penrith supporter at Sydney's Darling Harbour. It was alleged that the supporter yelled at Walsh “Moses Leota will take your head”. Walsh responded with “I'll take your mum’s”. Walsh played a total of 22 games for Brisbane in the 2023 NRL season. Walsh played in Brisbane's 26-24 loss against Penrith in the 2023 NRL Grand Final.

=== 2024 ===
In round 3 of the 2024 NRL season, Walsh was taken from the field during the club's grand final rematch loss against Penrith after colliding with Taylan May. It was later announced Walsh would be ruled out for potentially six weeks with a facial fracture.

On 26 March, it was reported that Walsh signed a five-year extension deal worth $5.5 million, making him the highest paid player in the club's history. In round 8 of the 2024 NRL season, Walsh scored two tries for Brisbane in their 34-10 victory over the Wests Tigers.

Walsh was once again selected for Queensland in game one of the 2024 State of Origin series, however in the 7th minute of the match Walsh was knocked unconscious by a late high hit from the shoulder of New South Wales centre Joseph Sua'li'i. Sua'li'i was subsequently sent-off and Walsh was immediately side-lined with a Category 1 HIA. Walsh missed 3 games for Brisbane following the incident, however he proceeded to play the second and third Origin matches which Queensland both lost. Walsh's efforts were criticised heavily as being particularly lackluster in the following matches, including being put on report in the decider.

Walsh played 14 games for Brisbane in the 2024 NRL season which saw the club miss the finals finishing 12th on the table. In October, Walsh was placed under investigation by the NRL after an alleged altercation with a fan in Bali. On 31 October, Walsh re-signed with the club on a four year deal.

=== 2025 ===
On 20 May, the Brisbane club placed Walsh under investigation after footage emerged of him punching another man in the head during a TikTok video. Walsh later deleted the video and posted on Instagram writing "Just to add context to the video recently posted - it was a joke with me best mate no one was harmed, boys being boys". In round 14 of the 2025 NRL season, Walsh scored two tries for Brisbane in their 44-14 victory over the Gold Coast.

On 1 September, Walsh again came under scrutiny after a private video emerged taken from his Snapchat story showing him drinking water from a toilet. The Brisbane club released a statement clarifying that the toilet was newly installed and unused, and that "The video represents a poor attempt at humour posted privately by Walsh". The incident went viral on social media platforms and within the NRL community, particularly as Brisbane were fighting to secure a top 4 spot in that weeks round 27 clash with the Melbourne Storm before entering the finals series. Walsh scored two tries for Brisbane in the 30-14 victory over Melbourne in round 27, including one which he celebrated by emulating himself drinking out of his cupped hand like as seen in the controversial video.

During Brisbane's Finals Week 1 clash against the Canberra Raiders, Walsh was sin-binned in the 53rd minute after headbutting Canberra player Hudson Young following an on-field altercation. As Walsh entered the tunnel after his binning he pointed the middle finger at Canberra fans sitting above heckling him. After returning to the field, Walsh went on to play a massive role in assisting a comeback as the Broncos were down 16 points. In the 79th minute, Walsh was struck in the legs by Zac Hosking whilst attempting to kick a 2-point field goal. This allowed Walsh to kick a penalty goal in front of the goal post, tying the match and sending it into extra-time and eventually golden point. Brisbane would go on to win the match 29-28, largely thanks to Walsh's efforts. Walsh was fined a total of $4800 by the NRL judiciary following the match, however he received no match bans allowing him to play in Brisbane's preliminary final victory against the Penrith Panthers and eventually the 2025 NRL Grand Final.

Walsh played in Brisbane's 26-22 victory against Melbourne in the 2025 NRL Grand Final, winning the Clive Churchill Medal for his man-of-the-match performance. In his post-match speech after winning the medal, Walsh once again referenced the toilet saga by signing off with "Plumber out" and drinking from his cupped hand.

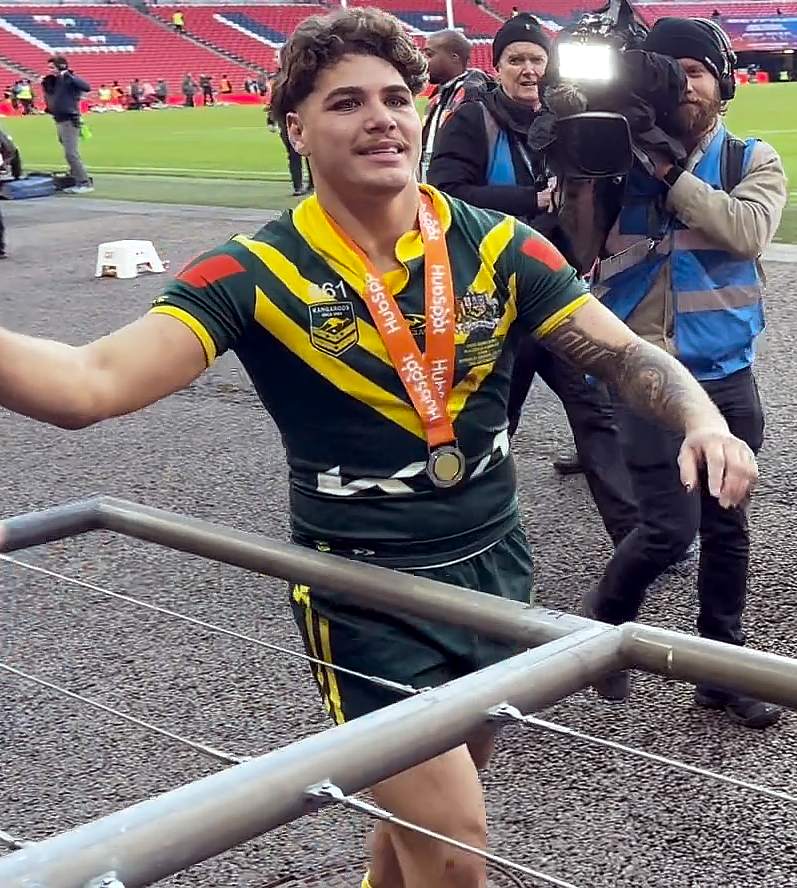
Walsh post game at Wembley in 2025

Shortly after the Grand Final, Walsh was selected to represent Australia in the 2025 Kangaroo tour of England by former Brisbane coach Kevin Walters. Walsh was named starting fullback for the series replacing former Australian fullback Dylan Edwards. Walsh made his debut in the first test against England, where he scored two tries and won Man-of-the-Match.

=== 2026 ===
On 19 February, Walsh played in Brisbane's World Club Challenge loss against Hull Kingston Rovers. In round 5 of the 2026 NRL season, Walsh suffered a suspected fractured cheekbone in Brisbane's win over the Gold Coast. Walsh was later ruled out for a minimum of six weeks.

Walsh was named on the interchange bench for Queensland in Game 2 and Game 3 of the 2026 State of Origin series. In the 44th minute of Game 3, Walsh was subbed on in the halves after Sam Walker left due to a HIA; his first appearance for the Maroons in 2 years. Walsh's entrance into the game briefly sparked some energy into the heavily struggling Maroons side, who were down 14 points. Queensland would lose the match.

Despite a disappointing season with Brisbane which saw the club finish 14th, Walsh was selected for Australia ahead of the 2026 Rugby League World Cup. Walsh played in Australia's World Cup final victory over New Zealand. In the post match interviews, Walsh said "The chat from everybody coming into this tournament, everyone wrote us off, talking about how good all the other teams are and how good their coaches are. I feel we got disrespected. Seeing all the Aussie fans coming out - how's that for culture, baby?".

== Statistics ==
=== Club ===
†	Denotes seasons in which Walsh won an NRL Premiership

Season	Team	Matches	T	G	GK %	F/G	Pts
2021	New Zealand	16	9	21	70.00%	0	78
2022	New Zealand	22	2	48	78.69%	0	104
2023	Brisbane	22	9	3	60.00%	1	43
2024	Brisbane	14	14	18	90.00%	0	92
2025†	Brisbane	21	14	34	75.56%	0	124
2026	Brisbane	16	6	12	92.31%	0	48
2027	Brisbane						
Career totals		111	54	136	78.76%	1	489

== Honours ==
Individual

- Warriors Rookie of the Year: 2021
- RLPA Rookie of the Year: 2021
- Warriors' People's Choice Award: 2022
- Brisbane Broncos Best Back: 2023, 2025
- RLPA Dream Team Fullback: 2023
- GQ Breakthrough Sportsman of the Year: 2023
- Battle Medal: 2025
- Clive Churchill Medal: 2025
- Harry Sunderland Medal: 2026
- Australian Kangaroos Players Player Award: 2026

Team

- NRL Grand Finalist: 2023, 2025
- NRL Premiership: 2025

Representative

- State of Origin Series Winner: 2023, 2025*
- Ashes Test Series Winner: 2025
- Rugby League World Cup: 2026

* Didn't officially play, named 18th man in origin decider

== Personal life ==
Walsh is the father of a daughter, Leila, who was born in 2021. Since 2024, Walsh has often appeared in public wearing nail polish painted by his daughter. This has led to Walsh receiving homophobic comments online.

In March 2026, Walsh starred in the reality TV show Rivals: Sport vs. Sport representing "Team Rugby League" alongside Jaime Chapman, Ali Brigginshaw, and Josh Addo-Carr.
