= Corey Parker (rugby league) =

Australian rugby league footballer (born 1982)

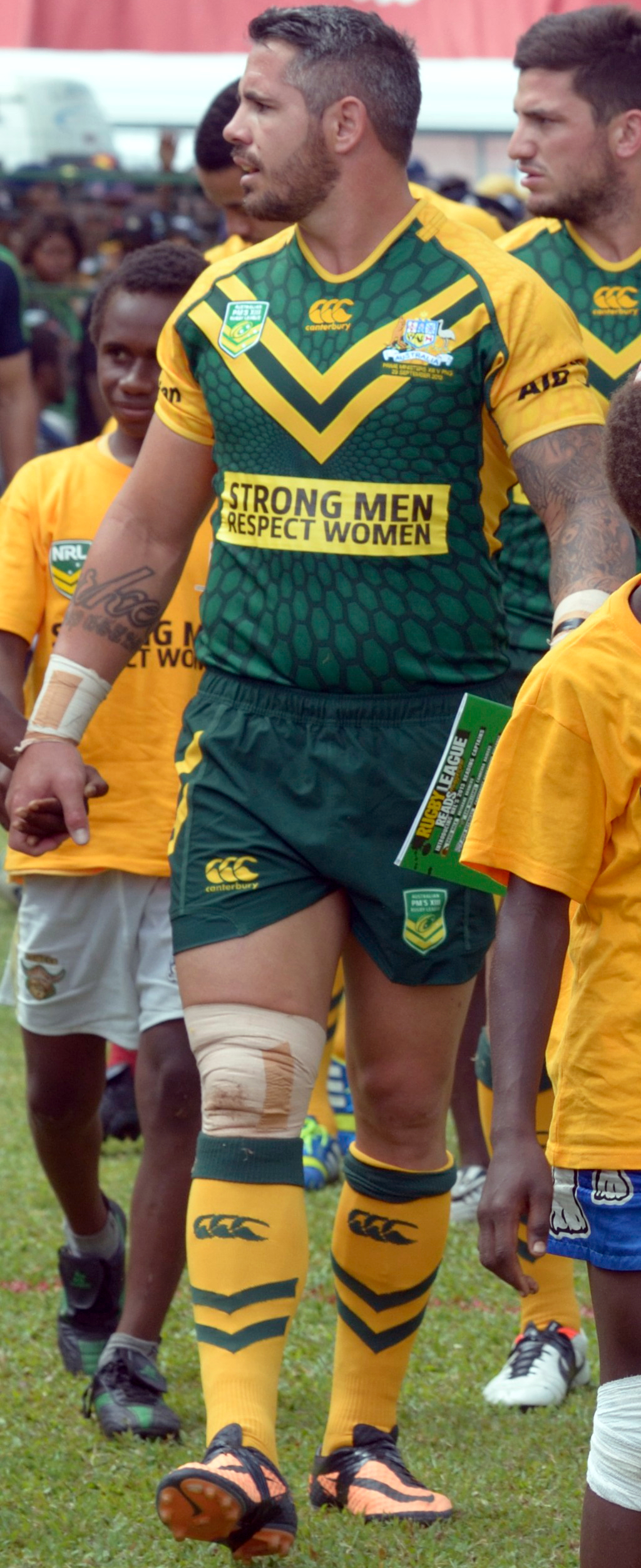

Personal information
- Born: 5 May 1982 (age 44) Brisbane, Queensland, Australia

Playing information
- Height: 188 cm (6 ft 2 in)
- Weight: 101 kg (15 st 13 lb)
- Position: Lock, Second-row, Prop
Club
Years	Team	Pld	T	G	FG	P
2001–16	Brisbane Broncos	347	39	586	0	1328
Representative
Years	Team	Pld	T	G	FG	P
2004–16	Queensland	19	0	0	0	0
2010–13	Prime Minister's XIII	2	0	3	0	6
2011–16	Australia	13	0	4	0	8
2015	NRL All Stars	1	0	0	0	0

Corey Parker (born 5 May 1982) is an Australian former professional rugby league footballer who played for the Brisbane Broncos in the NRL. A Queensland State of Origin and Australia international representative, Parker played in the lock, second-row and prop positions. Parker played his entire professional career at the Broncos club, with whom he won the 2006 NRL Premiership. He also fulfilled goal kicking duties for the Broncos.

== Playing career ==
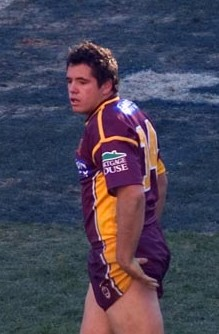
Parker playing for the Broncos in 2004

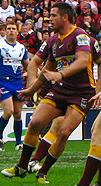
Parker in action against the Bulldogs in 2008

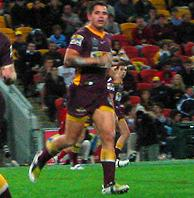
Parker in action for the Broncos in 2008

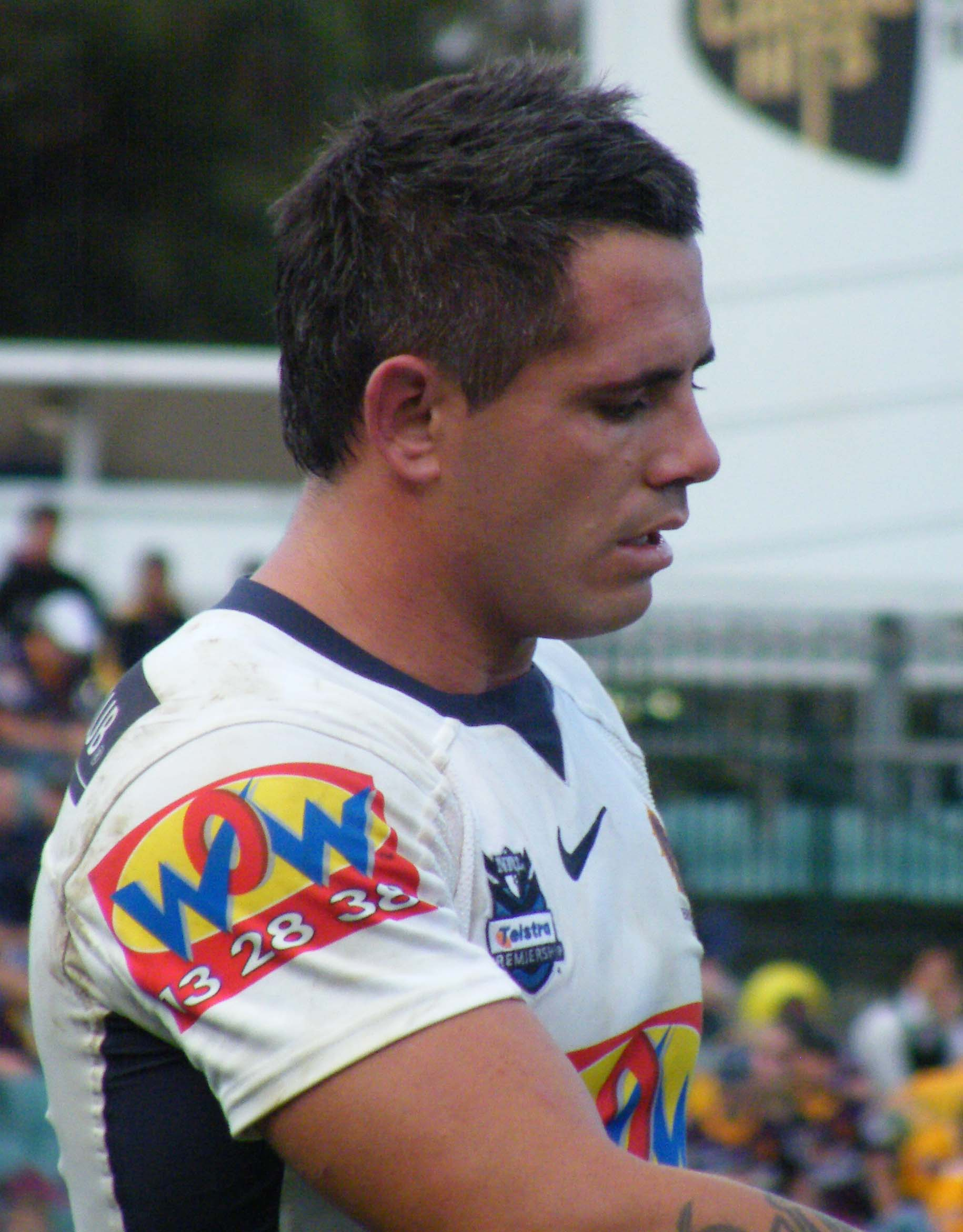
Parker playing for the Broncos in 2009

=== 2000s ===
Parker made his NRL debut in 2001 with the Broncos, scoring a try in his first match. At some point, he weighed 108 kilogrammes and played prop. The same year, Parker and Brent Tate both considered offers from the Canterbury Bulldogs, meeting with club officials in secret. Coach Wayne Bennett found out about the meeting, and dropped both Parker and Tate to reserve grade as a result.

Parker was selected to represent Queensland as an interchange for games II and III of the 2004 State of Origin series and game III of the 2005 State of Origin series.

During a match against the Wests Tigers at Campbelltown Stadium, coach Wayne Bennett watched as fellow Bronco Shane Webcke was taken off the field by a trainer after being knocked out by Wests Tigers prop Bryce Gibbs. Parker was brought on as a replacement for Webcke, and, as noticed, the Broncos played with 14 men. Parker immediately scored a try following the Webcke incident. An investigation days later stripped the Broncos (who won the match 32–24) of the two competition points gained but an appeal held weeks later saw the two points reinstated.

Parker was the highest point-scorer for the Broncos with a total of 142 points in 2006. He was selected to play from the interchange bench in Brisbane's victory in the 2006 NRL Grand Final. As 2006 NRL Premiers, the Brisbane Broncos travelled to England to face 2006 Super League champions, St Helens R.F.C. in the 2007 World Club Challenge. Parker played at second-row forward, scoring a try and kicking three goals from four attempts in the Broncos' 14–18 loss.

In 2007, despite suffering an injury in round one and missing the next eight games, he was again able to finish the season as the Broncos' top point-scorer. In the Broncos' first match of the NRL season 2008, Parker broke the Broncos' club record for most goals in a match, kicking ten from ten. On 26 March 2008, it was announced Parker had re signed with the Brisbane Broncos for a further 3 years.

At the start of season 2008, Parker was the first choice kicker for the Broncos, but during a knee injury which kept him on the sideline for 6 weeks, the Brisbane Broncos decided to make Michael Ennis the first choice kicker. Following Ennis' move to the Bulldogs at the end of 2008, Parker again became the Broncos' primary goal kicker in 2009.

For the 2009 NRL season new Broncos coach Ivan Henjak moved Parker to lock. This proved a success as in April that year he was named in the preliminary 25-man squad to represent Queensland in the opening State of Origin match for 2009. Although he did not make an appearance for the maroons, Parker won the 2009 Paul Morgan Medal as the Broncos' Player of the Year.

=== 2010s ===
On 14 May 2010, Parker played his 200th game for the Broncos, becoming the second youngest player to reach the milestone for the club. In September 2010, Corey Parker became captain of the Prime Ministers XIII.

Parker was named the 2011 forward of the year at the Broncos.

Parker played all three games of the 2013 State of Origin series in which Queensland extended their record for consecutive series victories to eight. Parker had made the most offloads out of all players in the 2013 NRL season. Parker was named the 2013 Brisbane Broncos season's player of the year. In the post season, he travelled to Europe with the Australian national team for the 2013 World Cup, helping them reclaim it. In 2013 Corey Parker was awarded International Lock of the Year, The Player's Player award, Most Consistent award, the Best Forward award, Dally M Lock of the Year, and Rugby League Week Player of The Year.

In 2014, Parker captained the Brisbane Broncos to the final of the Auckland Nines. In the Auckland Nines, Parker also scored a bonus try against the Roosters. Against the Eels in round 5 of 2014, Parker became the third ever Bronco to reach 1000 points, after Darren Lockyer and Michael De Vere. In May 2014 Corey Parker played in the Trans-Tasman test match for Australia, against New Zealand. Parker suffered an injury in round 13 against the Raiders, which ruled him out of Game 2 of the 2014 State of Origin. He made his return in Game 3 and received Man of the Match. Peter Sterling quoted Parker's Game 3 as being the best performance by a forward in a State of Origin game he has seen. In Round 25 against the Dragons, Parker became the second highest point scorer in Brisbane Broncos history with 1066 points.

In Round 1 of the 2015 NRL season, Corey Parker played his 300th NRL game, against the South Sydney Rabbitohs. This made Parker the 22nd NRL player to play 300 games. After the Queensland Maroons 52–6 victory against the New South Wales Blues in the 2015 State of Origin to win the series, Parker was awarded the Wally Lewis Medal. In Round 22 of the 2015 NRL season against the Canterbury-Bankstown Bulldogs, Parker succeeded Darren Lockyer as the Broncos' highest ever points scorer.

Within the weeks leading up to the 2016 NRL season, coach Wayne Bennett announced Parker as the Broncos captain. In June 2016, Parker announced that he would retire from the NRL at years end.

In 2020, Parker was announced to make a return for the Brisbane Broncos in the NRL Nines competition

== Post-playing career ==
In 2017, Parker became a sideline commentator for Fox League. On 5 September 2024, it was announced that Parker would join the SENQ Breakfast team as a host in 2025. In December 2024, Parker was dumped from sideline commentating, as the sports broadcaster had decided to use "another Queensland figure" to commentate on games.

In 2026, Parker joined the Seven Network as the presenter of its rugby league analysis show The Agenda Setters: Rugby League.

== Personal life ==
Corey Parker is married to Margaux Parker with their four children.

His mother was born in New Zealand.

== Statistics ==
Season	Team	Pld	T	G	FG	Pts
2001	Brisbane Broncos	13	2	0	0	8
2002	Brisbane Broncos	20	2	0	0	8
2003	Brisbane Broncos	23	3	0	0	12
2004	Brisbane Broncos	25	3	13	0	38
2005	Brisbane Broncos	23	1	1	0	6
2006	Brisbane Broncos	25	4	63	0	142
2007	Brisbane Broncos	18	4	45	0	106
2008	Brisbane Broncos	19	3	34	0	80
2009	Brisbane Broncos	27	5	75	0	170
2010	Brisbane Broncos	21	1	69	0	142
2011	Brisbane Broncos	24	3	74	0	160
2012	Brisbane Broncos	17	0	34	0	68
2013	Brisbane Broncos	22	2	10	0	28
2014	Brisbane Broncos	22	0	57	0	114
2015	Brisbane Broncos	24	3	66	0	144
2016	Brisbane Broncos	24	3	45	0	102
	Totals	347	39	586	0	1328

Sporting positions
Preceded by Justin Hodges	Captain; Brisbane Broncos; 2016	Succeeded by Darius Boyd
Awards
Preceded by Paul Gallen	Dally M Lock of the Year; 2013	Succeeded by Sam Burgess
Preceded by Andrew McCullough	Brisbane Broncos; Paul Morgan Medal; 2013	Succeeded by Ben Hunt
Preceded by Alex Glenn	Brisbane Broncos; Best Forward; 2013	Succeeded by Josh McGuire
Preceded by Sam Thaiday	Brisbane Broncos; Best Forward; 2011	Succeeded by Alex Glenn
Preceded by Sam Thaiday	Brisbane Broncos; Paul Morgan Medal; 2009	Succeeded by Josh Hoffman
