= Mark Taufua =

Samoa international rugby league footballer

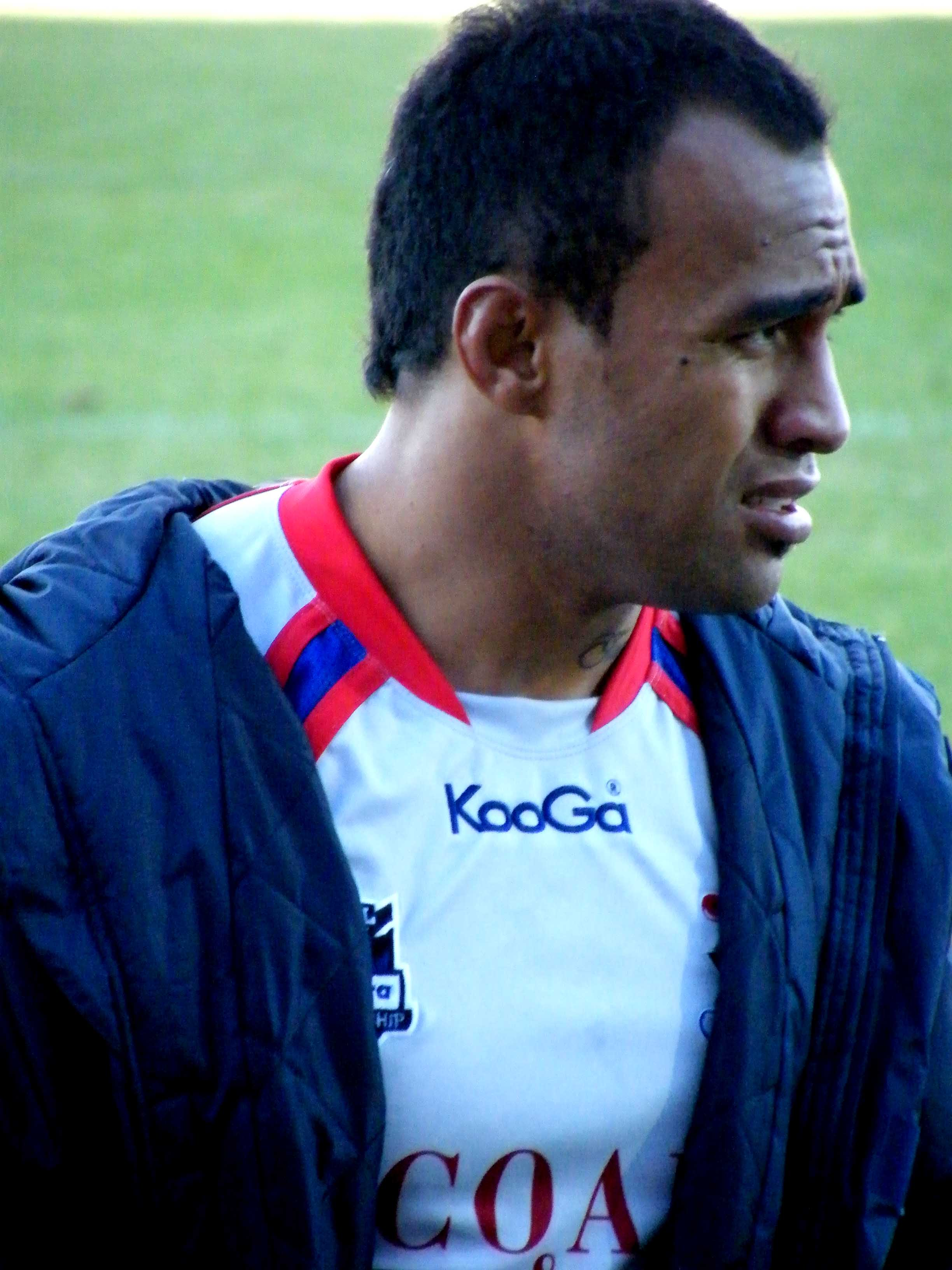

Personal information
- Full name: Mark Larry Taufua
- Born: 24 October 1981 (age 45) Newcastle, New South Wales, Australia
- Height: 188 cm (6 ft 2 in)
- Weight: 106 kg (16 st 10 lb)

Playing information
- Position: Prop, Lock
Club
Years	Team	Pld	T	G	FG	P
2007–11	Newcastle Knights	67	5	0	0	20
2012–13	Cronulla Sharks	21	1	0	0	4
	Total	88	6	0	0	24
Representative
Years	Team	Pld	T	G	FG	P
2009–13	Samoa	6	0	0	0	0
- Source: Rugby League Project

Mark Larry Taufua, also known by the nicknames of "Mareko", or "Marky" (born 24 October 1981), is a Samoan former rugby league footballer who played as a prop and lock. He played for the Newcastle Knights and the Cronulla-Sutherland Sharks in the NRL.

== Background ==
He was born in Newcastle, New South Wales, Australia and is of Samoan descent.

His younger brother Larry Jnr, played for the Newcastle Knights in the Jersey Flegg Cup in 2006 and 2007.

== Playing career ==
After playing junior rugby league in Maitland Pickers for the Woodberry Warriors, Taufua switched to rugby union, playing for the Waratahs in the Newcastle and Hunter Rugby Union competition. He was a Newcastle and NSW Country rugby union representative when in 2006 Brian Smith, the Knights coach at that time discovered him. After debuting in the NRL midway through 2007, at 25, Taufua continued to improve. In 2008, a Newcastle Herald article nicknamed him "The Samoan stealth bomber" after "teeth-rattling tackles and bone-jarring charges" against the Melbourne Storm, and in 2009, played in every game for Newcastle except their first-round loss to the Gold Coast. He only missed a few games in 2010 due to injury.

On 7 June 2011, Taufua signed with the Cronulla-Sutherland Sharks for two years, starting in 2012.

Throughout the 2013 season, Taufua struggled to obtain game time in the NRL, due to the likes of Luke Lewis, Paul Gallen and Andrew Fifita, before him, but had a fitting end to his career with a stellar season as starting prop in a NSW Cup Premiership side, captained by Chad Townsend. He announced his retirement from the game after the 2013 Rugby League World Cup. Taufua later played for the West Newcastle Rosellas in the Newcastle Rugby League competition.

== Representative career ==
In 2009 he was named as part of the Samoan side for the Pacific Cup.

In April 2013 he played for Samoa in their 2013 Polynesian Cup against fierce pacific rivals Tonga.

Later in the year, Mark played for Samoa in their successful 2013 Rugby League World Cup campaign.

== Personal life ==
Mark Taufua is the second eldest son of Feiloivao Lilomaiava Taulave (Lave/Larry) Taufua, who is a Paramount Chief of Faleatiu, A'ana, Samoa. Taufua's father was also a Heavy Weight boxer in New Zealand during the late 70s, where his alias was "Prince Tattoo" (due to his traditional Samoan tattoo known as Tatau or Pe'a. His mother Lulu Sapaea Faofua (Taufua) of Laulii died in 1996 due to cancer.

He is the uncle of current Brisbane Broncos player Payne Haas and Gold Coast Titans player Klese Haas.
