= Matt Gillett =

Australia international rugby league footballer

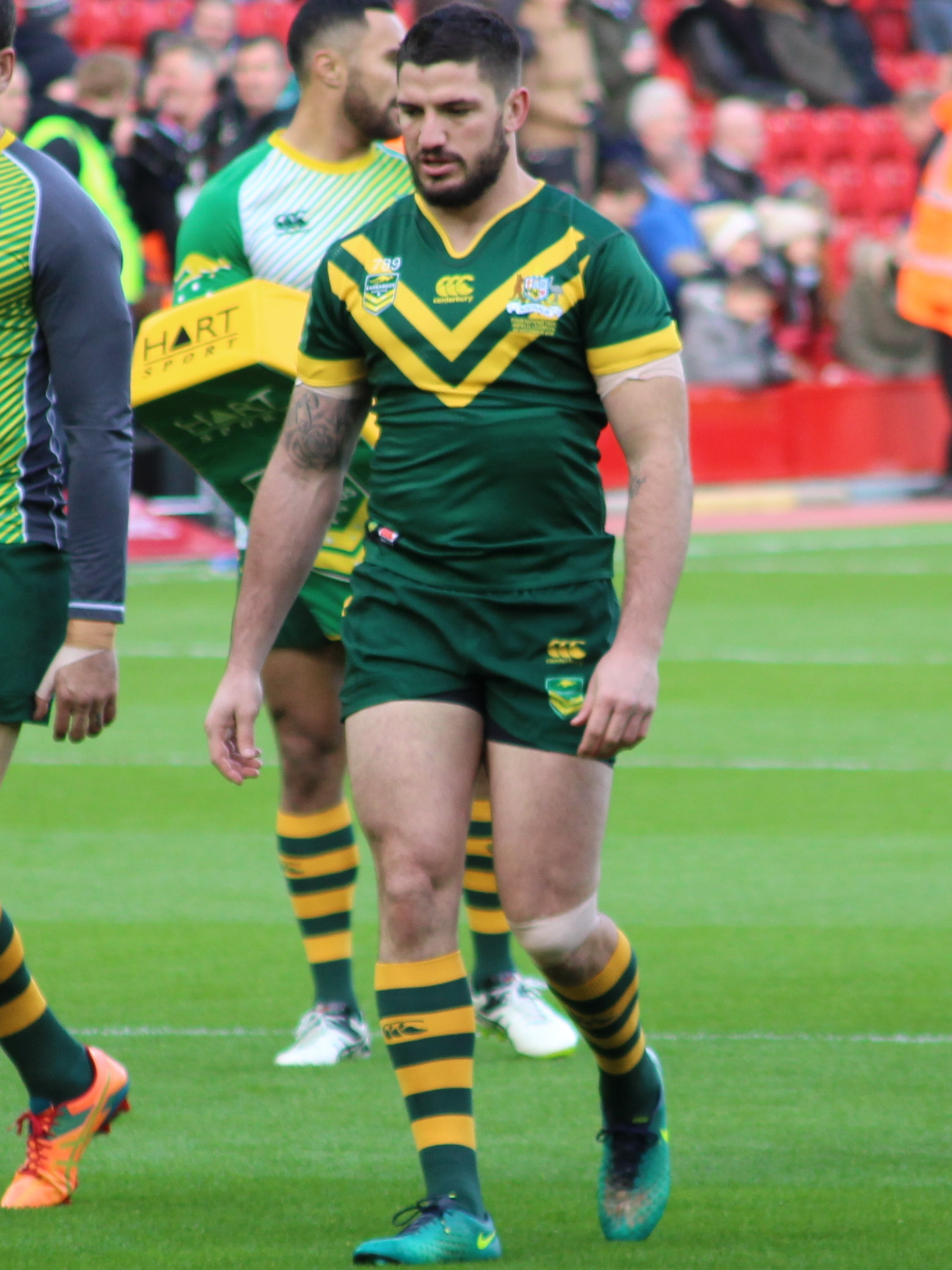

Personal information
- Full name: Matthew Gillett
- Born: 12 August 1988 (age 38) Macksville, New South Wales, Australia

Playing information
- Height: 186 cm (6 ft 1 in)
- Weight: 104 kg (16 st 5 lb)
- Position: Second-row, Lock
Club
Years	Team	Pld	T	G	FG	P
2010–19	Brisbane Broncos	202	59	0	0	236
Representative
Years	Team	Pld	T	G	FG	P
2010–13	Prime Minister's XIII	2	0	0	0	0
2012–19	Queensland	20	2	0	0	8
2014–17	Australia	12	2	0	0	8

Matthew Gillett (born 12 August 1988) is an Australian former professional rugby league footballer who played as a second-row or lock forward in the 2010s.

He played for the Brisbane Broncos in the NRL and Australia at international level. Gillett also played for Queensland in the State of Origin series and the Prime Minister's XIII. Gillett also started games as a centre, five-eighth, winger in his career.

== Background ==
Gillett was born in Macksville, New South Wales, Australia and moved with his family to Bribie Island, Queensland at the age of three years.

== Playing career ==
=== 2010 ===
After Gillett's impressive year in the Queensland Cup, Brisbane Broncos head coach Ivan Henjak rewarded Gillett with a preseason in 2010. In Round 1 of the 2010 NRL season Gillett made his NRL debut for the Brisbane Broncos in the season opening match against the North Queensland Cowboys, playing off the interchange bench and scoring a try on debut in the Broncos 30–24 win at Suncorp Stadium. On 23 June 2010, Gillett extended his contract with the Brisbane Broncos for a further three-years, keeping him at the NRL club until 2013. On 8 September 2010, Gillett won the 2010 Rookie of the Year Award at the 2010 Dally M Awards presentations. Gillett finished his NRL debut year with him playing in 21 matches and scoring 12 tries. Gillett was named the 2010 Brisbane Broncos season's rookie of the year. On 26 September 2010, Gillett was selected for the Prime Minister's XIII and played in the 30–18 win over Papua New Guinea in Port Moresby.

=== 2011 ===
Gillett finished the Broncos 2011 NRL season with him playing in 19 matches and 6 scoring tries. In the preliminary finals match against the Manly-Warringah Sea Eagles at the SFS, Gillett filled in at five-eighth for the retiring Broncos legend Darren Lockyer after Lockyer suffered a cheekbone injury in the 13–12 Semi Finals win against the St George Illawarra Dragons at Suncorp Stadium.

=== 2012 ===
Gillett was selected as the 18th man in the Australian Kangaroos for the 2012 Anzac test in April, however he didn't make his test debut. A month after the ANZAC test, Gillett was selected in the Queensland Maroons squad. On 23 May 2012, Gillett made his representative debut Queensland against New South Wales in Game 1 of the 2012 State of Origin series, playing off the interchange bench in the 18–10 win at Docklands Stadium. Gillett played in all 3 games of the Maroons 7th in-a-row shield winning series. Gillett finished off the Broncos 2012 NRL season with him playing in 23 matches and scoring 6 tries.

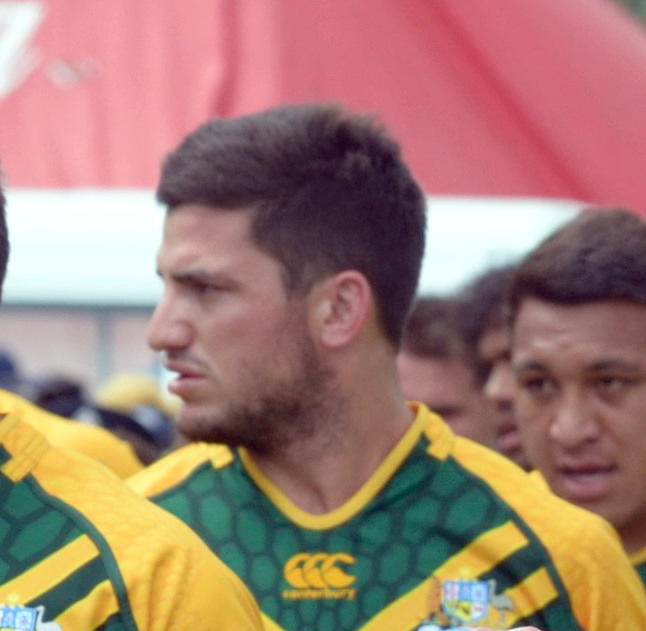
Gillett lining up for the Prime Minister's XIII

=== 2013 ===
On 10 April 2013, Gillett re-signed with the Brisbane Broncos until the end of 2016 NRL season. Gillett played from the interchange bench in all three games of the 2013 State of Origin series, helping Queensland extend their record for consecutive series victories to eight. Gillett finished off the Broncos 2013 NRL season with him playing in 22 matches and scoring 7 tries. On 29 September 2013. Gillett got selected for the Prime Minister's XIII and played off the interchange bench in the 50–10 win over Papua New Guinea in Kokopo.

=== 2014 ===
On 14 February 2014, Gillett was selected in the Broncos inaugural 2014 Auckland Nines squad. On 2 May 2014, Gillett made his international debut for Australia against New Zealand in the 2014 Anzac Test, playing off the interchange bench in the 30–18 win at Sydney Football Stadium after he was originally named the 18th man but replaced club teammate Sam Thaiday to make the 17-man team. Gillett was selected for the Queensland Maroons and played in all 3 matches of the 2014 State of Origin series as they lost the series for the first time since 2005. In Round 21 against the Manly-Warringah Sea Eagles, Gillett played his 100th NRL career match for the Broncos in the Broncos 16–4 loss at Brookvale Oval. In Round 25 against the St George Illawarra Dragons, Gillet was wrongfully sin-binned by referee Ben Cummins for making a tackle while allegedly offside, when he was actually 30m onside, a blunder that could have cost the Broncos a finals berth after they had a 24–4 lead and the Dragons did a minor comeback but the Broncos were lucky to escape with a 30–22 win at Suncorp Stadium. Gillett finished off the Broncos 2014 NRL season with him playing in 21 matches and scoring 10 tries. In September 2014, Gillett was selected for the Australia Kangaroos Four Nations train-on squad but withdrew due to injury.

=== 2015 ===
In Round 1 of the 2015 NRL season, against the South Sydney Rabbitohs, Gillett scored the Broncos first try off the season off the interchange bench in the Broncos 36–6 loss at Suncorp Stadium. Gillett was selected in the Queensland Maroons squad for the 2015 State of Origin series. In Game 2, Gillett scored his first try in Maroon colours in the series tying 26–18 loss at Melbourne Cricket Ground. Gillett played in all 3 matches and scored 2 tries for Queensland in the 2–1 series win. On 4 October 2015, in the Broncos Queensland derby 2015 NRL Grand Final against the North Queensland Cowboys, Gillett played at second-row in the Broncos historic golden point 17–16 loss. Gillett finished the 2015 NRL season having played in 25 matches and scoring 3 tries for the Broncos.

=== 2016 ===
On 6 May 2016, Gillett played for Australia against New Zealand, starting at second-row in the 16–0 win at Hunter Stadium. For the 2016 State of Origin series, Gillett played for Queensland, starting at second-row in all 3 matches in the Maroons 2–1 series win. During the season, Rumours were floating around about where would Gillett will end up after season's end due to his contract expiring, Gillett reportedly had talks with the Cronulla-Sutherland Sharks, the Gold Coast Titans, the Manly-Warringah Sea Eagles and the New Zealand Warriors. In Round 26, against the Sydney Roosters, Gillett played his 150th NRL match in the Broncos 24–14 win at Suncorp Stadium. On 13 September 2016, Gillett agreed to re-sign with the Broncos on a 4-year extension, to the end of the 2020 season after months of speculation of who he would sign with. On 28 September 2016, at the 2016 Dally M Awards, Gillett was named as the Dally M Second-rower of the Year after another outstanding season for the Broncos. Gillett finished the 2016 NRL season with him playing in 21 matches and scoring 3 tries for the Broncos. On 20 September 2016, Gillett was added to the Kangaroos 2016 Four Nations train-on squad. On 4 October 2016, Gillett was selected in the Australian Kangaroos final 24-man squad for the tournament. On 13 November 2016, when the Kangaroos played against England, Gillett scored his first international try for Australia in the 36–18 win at London Olympic Stadium. Gillett played in 4 matches and scored 1 try of tournament including starting at second-row in the Kangaroos 34–8 Four Nations Final win against New Zealand at Anfield.

=== 2017 ===
In February 2017, Gillett was selected in the Broncos 2017 NRL Auckland Nines squad. On 5 May 2017, Gillett played for Australia in the 2017 ANZAC Test against New Zealand where he started at second-row and was awarded as the Man of the Match after toppling the tackle count with 46 during the 30–12 win at Canberra Stadium. For the 2017 State of Origin series, Gillett played in all 3 matches, starting at second-row in the Maroons 2–1 series win. Gillett finished the 2017 NRL season with him playing in 25 matches and scoring 7 tries for the Broncos. On 27 September 2017, Gillett again was awarded as the Second-Rower of the Year at the 2017 Dally M Awards night. On 3 October 2017, Gillett was selected in the 24-man Australia Kangaroos 2017 Rugby League World Cup squad. Gillett played in 5 matches of the tournament, starting at second-row in all of them including in the World Cup Final against England in the hard-fought 6–0 victory at Suncorp Stadium.

=== 2018 ===
Gillett was only restricted to play in 5 matches for the Broncos in the 2018 NRL season after he suffered a serious neck injury. In Round 1 against the St George Illawarra Dragons, Gillett suffered the injury while running up the ball and being tackled by Dragons forward Luciano Leilua during the 34–12 loss at Jubilee Oval. Thinking it was a sore neck, Gillett was told by the medical staff to get scans after playing in 4 more matches through the pain, Gillett received the bad news that he had a fracture in the neck and was forced to sit out for the rest of the year. On 23 May 2018, Gillett extended his contract with the Broncos on a 4-year deal, to the end of the 2022 season, Gillet commenting on the signing, "being a one-club at the Broncos is a very special thing".

=== 2019 ===
In Round 1 against the Melbourne Storm, Gillett made his return to the field from his neck injury in the Broncos 22–12 loss at AAMI Park. Playing back at lock instead of right back row, Gillett said, "It felt like I was in a washing machine cycle for about 70 minutes, just running around trying to do my job." Gillett would recapture his good form in the early rounds even though the Broncos did struggle to win matches, earning a recall back into the Queensland squad over Gavin Cooper for the 2019 State of Origin series.

Gillett made 17 appearances for Brisbane in the 2019 NRL season as the club finished 8th on the table and qualified for the finals. Gillett played his 200th and final NRL game in the club's elimination final against Parramatta which Brisbane lost 58–0 at Western Sydney Stadium. The defeat was, at the time, the worst in Brisbane's history and also the biggest finals defeat in history.

On 31 October, Gillett announced his retirement from rugby league due to ongoing injuries.

=== Statistics ===
Season	Matches	Tries	Goals	F/G	Points
2010	21	12	–	–	48
2011	19	6	–	–	24
2012	23	6	–	–	24
2013	22	7	–	–	28
2014	21	10	–	–	40
2015	25	3	–	–	12
2016	19	3	–	–	12
2017	25	7	–	–	28
2018	5	0	–	–	0
2019	17	4	–	–	16
Total	197	58	-	-	232

=== Honours ===
Individual

- Dally M Rookie Of The Year: 2010
- Brisbane Broncos Rookie Of The Year: 2010
- Brisbane Broncos Play Of The Year: 2011, 2017
- Dally M Second-Row Of The Year: 2016, 2017
- Brisbane Broncos Most Consistent: 2016
- Brisbane Broncos Forward Of The Year: 2017

Club

- NRL Grand Finalist: 2015

Representative

- State Of Origin Series Winner: 2012, 2013, 2015, 2016, 2017
- ANZAC Test Series Winner: 2016
- Ashes Test Series Winner: 2017
- World Cup Champion: 2017
