= Payne Haas =

Australian and Samoan international rugby league footballer

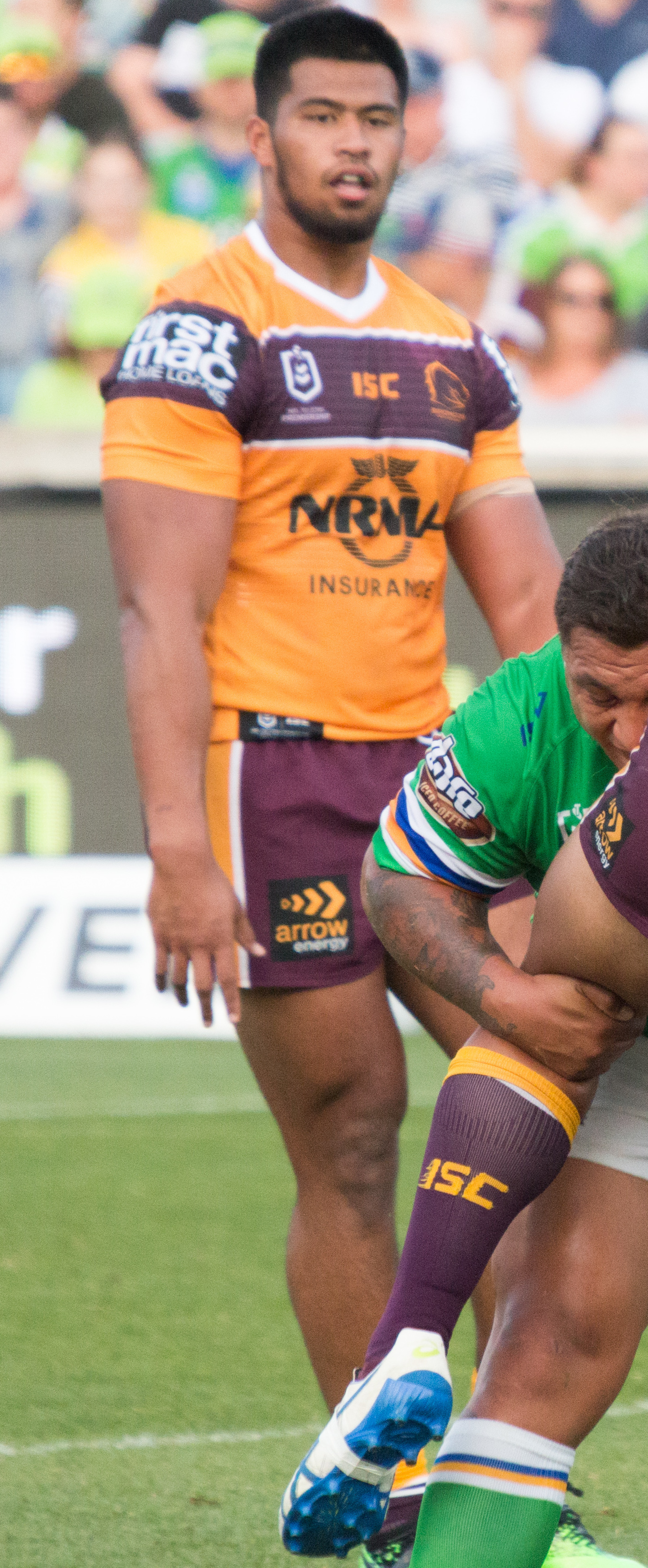

Personal information
- Full name: Payne Luckee Haas
- Born: 2 December 1999 (age 26) Newcastle, New South Wales, Australia
- Height: 194 cm (6 ft 4 in)
- Weight: 119 kg (18 st 10 lb)

Playing information
- Position: Prop
Club
Years	Team	Pld	T	G	FG	P
2018–26	Brisbane Broncos	159	16	0	0	64
2027–	South Sydney	0	0	0	0	0
	Total	159	16	0	0	64
Representative
Years	Team	Pld	T	G	FG	P
2019–26	New South Wales	18	0	0	0	0
2019	Prime Minister's XIII	1	1	0	0	4
2019–23	Australia	4	1	0	0	4
2025	Samoa	3	1	0	0	4
- Source: As of 16 November 2026
- Education: Keebra Park State High School
- Relatives: Klese Haas (brother); Mark Taufua (uncle)

Payne Haas (born 2 December 1999) is a professional rugby league footballer who plays as a prop for the South Sydney Rabbitohs in the National Rugby League. He has played for both Australia and Samoa at international level.

He has played for New South Wales in the State of Origin series and the Prime Minister's XIII.

== Background ==
Haas is of Samoan, Swiss and Filipino descent. Haas became a Muslim in 2019 at the age of 19.

He is eligible to play international rugby league for the Australia, Samoa and Philippines national rugby league teams. Haas has represented the Philippines at under 16s level.

Haas originally played rugby union as a loose head prop before switching to rugby league. He played junior rugby league for the Woodberry Warriors before moving to the Gold Coast, Queensland at age 13. He attended rugby league school Keebra Park State High School.

Haas is the nephew of former Newcastle Knights and Cronulla-Sutherland Sharks player Mark Taufua.

Haas's younger brother Klese Haas, plays for the Gold Coast Titans.

His mother, Uiatu "Joan" Taufua, was convicted and sentenced to nine months prison for assaulting two security guards at The Star casino in July 2022. In December that year, she was involved in a car crash that led to three deaths, after allegedly fleeing police earlier. She was subsequently charged with three counts of manslaughter and dangerous operation of a motor vehicle, evading police and driving without a driver's licence. She remains in custody.

In May 2024, Haas's father Gregor Johann (March 23, 1978), an alleged Sinaloa Cartel member, was arrested in the Philippines and accused of running drugs in Indonesia. He faces the death penalty if extradited and convicted there. In September 2024, Indonesian National Police IRD Head General Krishna Murti announced the Philippines and Indonesia discussed a Gregory Johann Hass-Alice Guo prisoner exchange. Extradition talks resumed after Alice Guo was returned to the Philippines.

== Playing career ==
=== Early years ===
In 2016, Haas played for the Australian Schoolboys. In September 2016, he signed a 3-year contract with the Brisbane Broncos until the end of 2019, after weighing up offers from 10 NRL clubs, plus scholarship offers from American football college teams.

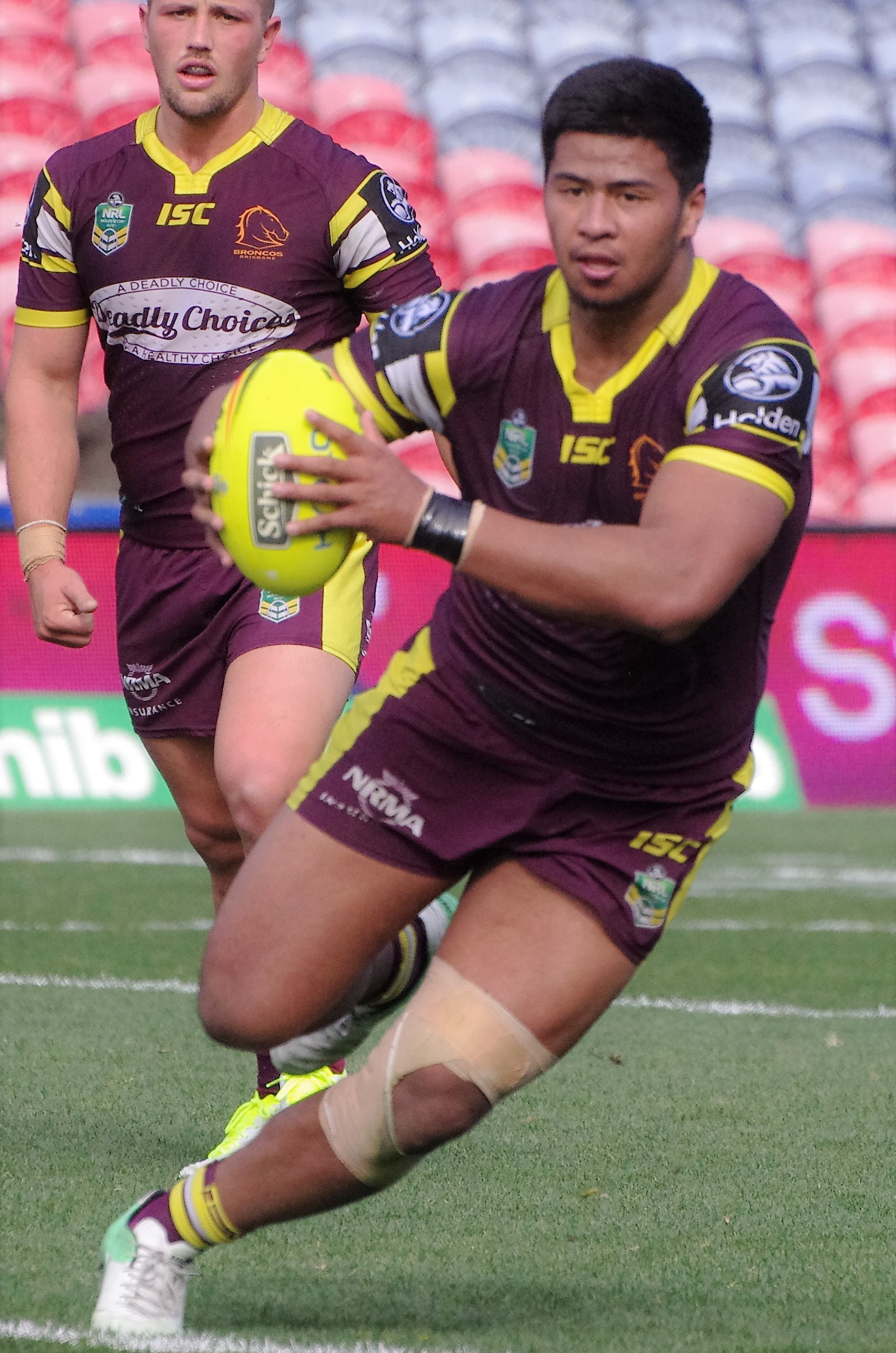
Haas playing for the Broncos' NYC team in 2017

In 2017, he played for the Broncos' NYC team. After impressing for the Broncos NYC side throughout the year, he was called in to act as an Andrew Fifita "clone" at a Queensland State of Origin opposed training session before game three of the 2017 series. In September 2017, he was named at prop in the NYC Team of the Year.

Haas scored nine tries in 18 games.

=== 2018 ===
In 2018, Haas played for the Broncos' Queensland Cup feeder side, Wynnum Manly Seagulls. In round 8 of the 2018 NRL season, he made his NRL debut for the Broncos against the South Sydney Rabbitohs. Commentator Phil Gould remarked that his debut game was "the birth of a superstar." He would go on to play two more games before missing the remainder of the season with an injured shoulder. In July 2018, the Broncos re-signed Haas on a 6-year contract.

=== 2019 ===
Haas, while fasting for his first ever Ramadan after converting to Islam in early 2019, scored the first try of his NRL career against the Sydney Roosters in round 10 on Friday 17 May 2019 at Suncorp Stadium in Brisbane.

On 26 May, Haas was selected in the New South Wales Blues Origin squad for Game 1 of the 2019 State of Origin series. This makes him the second most inexperienced player to play Origin having played only 10 NRL matches. Haas fasted for Ramadan up until the day before Game 1 of the 2019 State of Origin series on Wednesday 5 June 2019.

Haas missed out on selection for Game 2 and Game 3 of the 2019 State of Origin series which New South Wales won 2–1.

Haas made 21 appearances for Brisbane in the 2019 NRL season as the club finished 8th on the table and qualified for the finals. Haas played in the club's elimination final against Parramatta which Brisbane lost 58–0 at the new Western Sydney Stadium. The defeat was the worst in Brisbane's history and also the biggest finals defeat in history.

On 30 September, Haas was named at prop in the Australia PM XIII side. On 7 October, Haas was named in the Australian side for the upcoming Oceania Cup fixtures.

=== 2020 ===
Haas played 17 games for Brisbane in the 2020 NRL season as the club finished last on the table for the first time ever in their history. Brisbane only managed to win only three games for the entire year out of a possible 20 matches.

=== 2021 ===
Haas made 20 appearances for Brisbane in the 2021 NRL season as the club missed the finals. He played in all three games of the 2021 State of Origin series which New South Wales won 2–1.

=== 2022 ===
On 25 May 2022, Haas requested an immediate release from his Brisbane contract which was later rejected. In round 12 of the 2022 NRL season, Haas was booed by Brisbane supporters every time he touched the ball during the clubs victory over the Gold Coast. On 29 May 2022, Haas was selected by New South Wales to play in game one of the 2022 State of Origin series.

To finish up his club year, Haas was awarded Brisbane's Player of the Year award again for the fourth time in a row. He was later selected as a prop forward in the NRL team of the year at the Dally M Awards.

=== 2023 ===
On 22 May, Haas was selected by New South Wales for game one of the 2023 State of Origin series. Haas played in two matches for New South Wales as the blues lost the series 2–1. Haas played 23 matches for Brisbane in the 2023 NRL season. Haas played in Brisbane's 26–24 loss against Penrith in the 2023 NRL Grand Final.

=== 2024 ===
In round 2 of the 2024 NRL season, Haas suffered a knee injury in Brisbane's victory over South Sydney. Haas was later ruled out for an indefinite period. On 26 May, Haas was selected by New South Wales ahead of the 2024 State of Origin series. Haas played in all three games as New South Wales won the series 2–1. Haas was ruled out of the rest of the season after suffering a high ankle sprain, Haas would make a surprise return in the Broncos final match of the season.

=== 2025 ===
In April 2025, it was reported that Haas was considering switching his International allegiance from Australia to Samoa. In May, Haas was selected by New South Wales ahead of the 2025 State of Origin series. He played in all three games as New South Wales lost the series 2-1. In August, Haas committed to playing for Samoa at the international level. When speaking about his decision he said: "I feel like we can win it (The RLWC26), especially with the team we have got now". His is set to play for Samoa in Australia for the first time on October 26, playing against Tonga at Suncorp Stadium. Haas played 25 matches for Brisbane in the 2025 NRL season including the clubs 2025 NRL Grand Final victory over Melbourne.

=== 2026 ===
On 8 February, Haas announced he would part with Brisbane club at the end of the 2026 season and the South Sydney Rabbitohs announced that they had signed him on a three-year deal with the contract lodged. On 19 February, Haas played in Brisbane's World Club Challenge loss against Hull Kingston Rovers.

== Statistics ==
Year	Team	Games	Tries	Pts
2018	Brisbane Broncos	3	0	0
2019	Brisbane Broncos	21	4	16
2020	Brisbane Broncos	17	1	4
2021	Brisbane Broncos	20	1	4
2022	Brisbane Broncos	20	1	4
2023	Brisbane Broncos	23	1	4
2024	Brisbane Broncos	14	2	8
2025	Brisbane Broncos	23	3	12
2026	Brisbane Broncos	17	3	12
Career totals		159	16	64

*Season in progress.

== Honours ==
Individual

- Brisbane Broncos U20s Best Forward: 2017
- Holden Cup Team Of The Year: 2017
- Brisbane Broncos Fan Player: 2019
- Brisbane Broncos Player's Player: 2019, 2020, 2021, 2023, 2025
- Brisbane Broncos Player Of The Year: 2019, 2020, 2021, 2022, 2023, 2025
- Dally M Rookie Of The Year: 2019
- Dally M Prop Of The Year: 2019, 2021, 2022, 2023, 2025
- RLPA Dream Team Prop: 2019, 2021, 2023, 2025
- Brisbane Broncos Best Forward: 2020, 2021, 2022, 2023, 2025
- Brisbane Broncos Play Of The Year: 2021(Try Saver VS Sharks Round 16)
- Battle Medal: 2023
- Carl Webb Medal: 2025
- NSW True Blue Award: 2025

Club

- NRL Grand Finalist: 2023, 2025
- Pre-Season Challenge Winner: 2024, 2025
- NRL Premiership: 2025

Representative

- PM's XIII Test Winner: 2019
- Pacific Championship Winner: 2019
- State Of Origin Series Winner: 2019, 2021, 2024

== Rivalries ==
In 2020, he began a rivalry with long-time rival Tino Fa'asuamaleaui, after a fight broke out during the second State of Origin Game of the 2020 Series.

== Controversy ==
On 19 February 2019, Haas was suspended for four matches and fined $20,000 by Brisbane after he failed to cooperate fully with the NRL integrity unit regarding an investigation into off-field incidents involving family members.

On 16 January 2021, Haas was charged with offensive language and intimidating police at Tweed Heads. On 4 February 2021, Haas was given a two-year good behaviour bond over the incident. On 8 February 2021, Haas was given a $50,000 fine by the NRL and a three-match suspension as further punishment for intimidating police.

On 3 April 2022, it was announced that Haas had been placed under investigation by the Brisbane club after video footage emerged which showed Haas being involved in a drunken fight with teammate Albert Kelly.
