= Kotoni Staggs =

Australia rugby league footballer (born 1998)

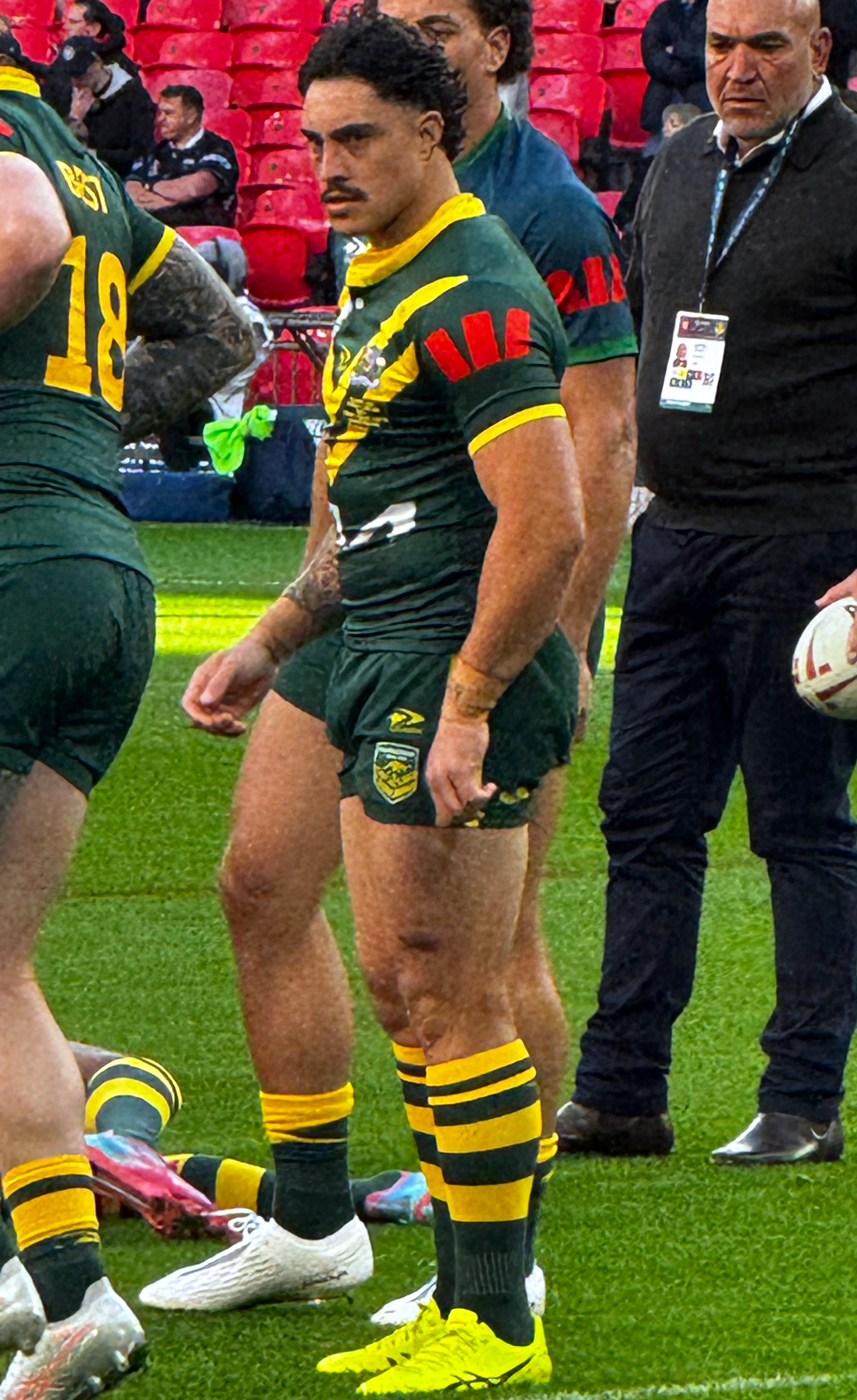

Personal information
- Full name: Kotoni Staggs
- Born: 29 October 1998 (age 28) Wellington, New South Wales, Australia
- Height: 183 cm (6 ft 0 in)
- Weight: 95 kg (14 st 13 lb)

Playing information
- Position: Centre
Club
| Years | Team | Pld | T | G | FG | P |
|---|---|---|---|---|---|---|
| 2018– | Brisbane Broncos | 166 | 73 | 75 | 0 | 442 |
Representative
| Years | Team | Pld | T | G | FG | P |
| 2019–24 | Indigenous All Stars | 2 | 0 | 0 | 0 | 0 |
| 2019–22 | Tonga | 3 | 0 | 3 | 0 | 6 |
| 2022–26 | New South Wales | 3 | 1 | 0 | 0 | 4 |
| 2023– | Australia | 11 | 3 | 5 | 0 | 22 |
- Source: As of 17 November 2026

Kotoni Staggs (born 29 October 1998) is a professional rugby league footballer who plays as a centre for the Brisbane Broncos in the National Rugby League, with whom he won the 2025 NRL Grand Final. He has represented Tonga and Australia at an international level.

He has also played representative football for the Indigenous All Stars and New South Wales. He has played as a five-eighth and second-rower in his career.

== Background ==
Staggs was born in Wellington, New South Wales, Australia and is of Indigenous Australian (Wiradjuri people) and Tongan descent.

He played his junior football for the Wellington Cowboys before being signed by the Brisbane Broncos.

== Playing career ==
=== 2017 ===
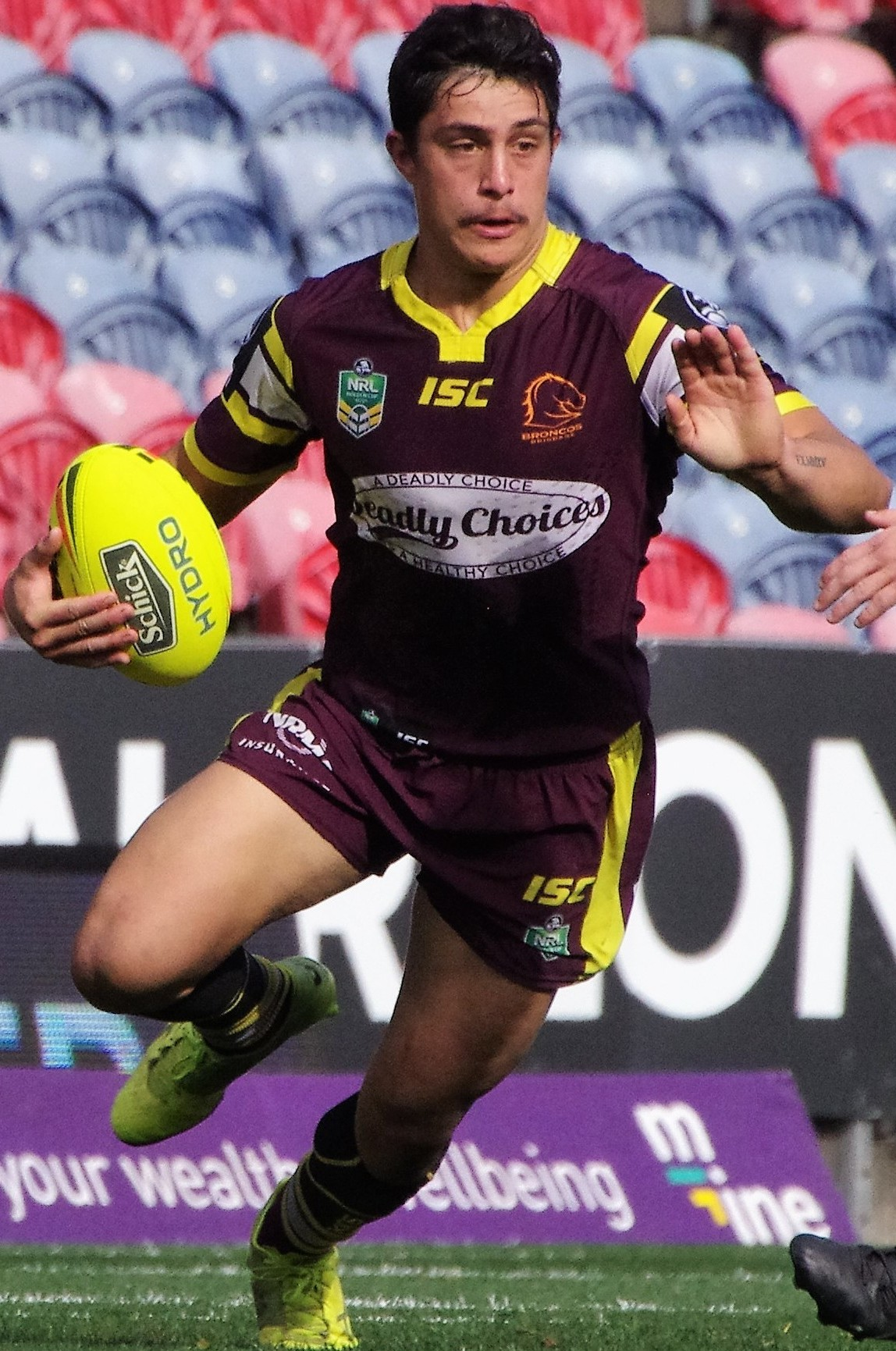
Staggs playing for the Broncos in 2017

Staggs played for the Broncos Holden Cup team in 2017, playing 25 games, scoring 12 tries and kicking 23 goals. Staggs was rewarded for his season winning the Broncos U20s Best Back of The Year Award.

=== 2018 ===
After showing great form in the Under 20's, Staggs was promoted up to the Queensland Cup, playing for the Redcliffe Dolphins. Staggs was showing great performances for the Dolphins in the early rounds, bouncing between Centre and Second-Row, his versatility catching the eye of Broncos coach Wayne Bennett to include him into the full-time squad.

In the lead-up to the Broncos clash against the Sydney Roosters in Round 11 of the 2018 NRL season, Staggs was selected to make his NRL debut for the Brisbane Broncos off the interchange bench after Bennett originally selected young centre Gehamat Shibasaki for the bench role but went with Staggs instead before his versatility to play in the backs and forwards.

During the match, after Broncos fill in centre Tom Opacic suffered a concussion in only the second minute, Staggs come on to cover as centre and had an impressive debut. He scored a try, set up a try for winger Corey Oates, ran for 57 metres, made nine tackles and recorded five tackle busts during the Broncos 28–22 win at Suncorp Stadium.

In the lead-up to the Broncos clash with the New Zealand Warriors, after Broncos centre James Roberts was ruled out of the match from an Achilles tendon injury, Staggs was not allowed to start at centre because he wasn't included in the Broncos top 32 squad at the start of the season, so Jaydn Su'A had to start at centre but broke his ankle during the Broncos 26-6 loss.

Staggs would finish his debut NRL season with him playing in 9 matches and scoring 2 tries for the Broncos in the 2018 NRL season.

When Staggs wasn't selected for the Broncos, he would ply his trade in the Queensland Cup. The Dolphins would make the 2018 Queensland Cup Grand Final against the Easts Tigers, with Staggs scoring a try and kicking 6 goals in the 36–22 win.

On 13 October 2018, Staggs was selected to play for the Junior Kangaroos against the Junior Kiwis, playing at second-row in the 40–24 win at Mt Smart Stadium.

=== 2019 ===
On 15 February 2019, Staggs represented the Indigenous All Stars against the New Zealand Maori All Stars team, playing off the interchange bench in the 34–14 win at AAMI Park.

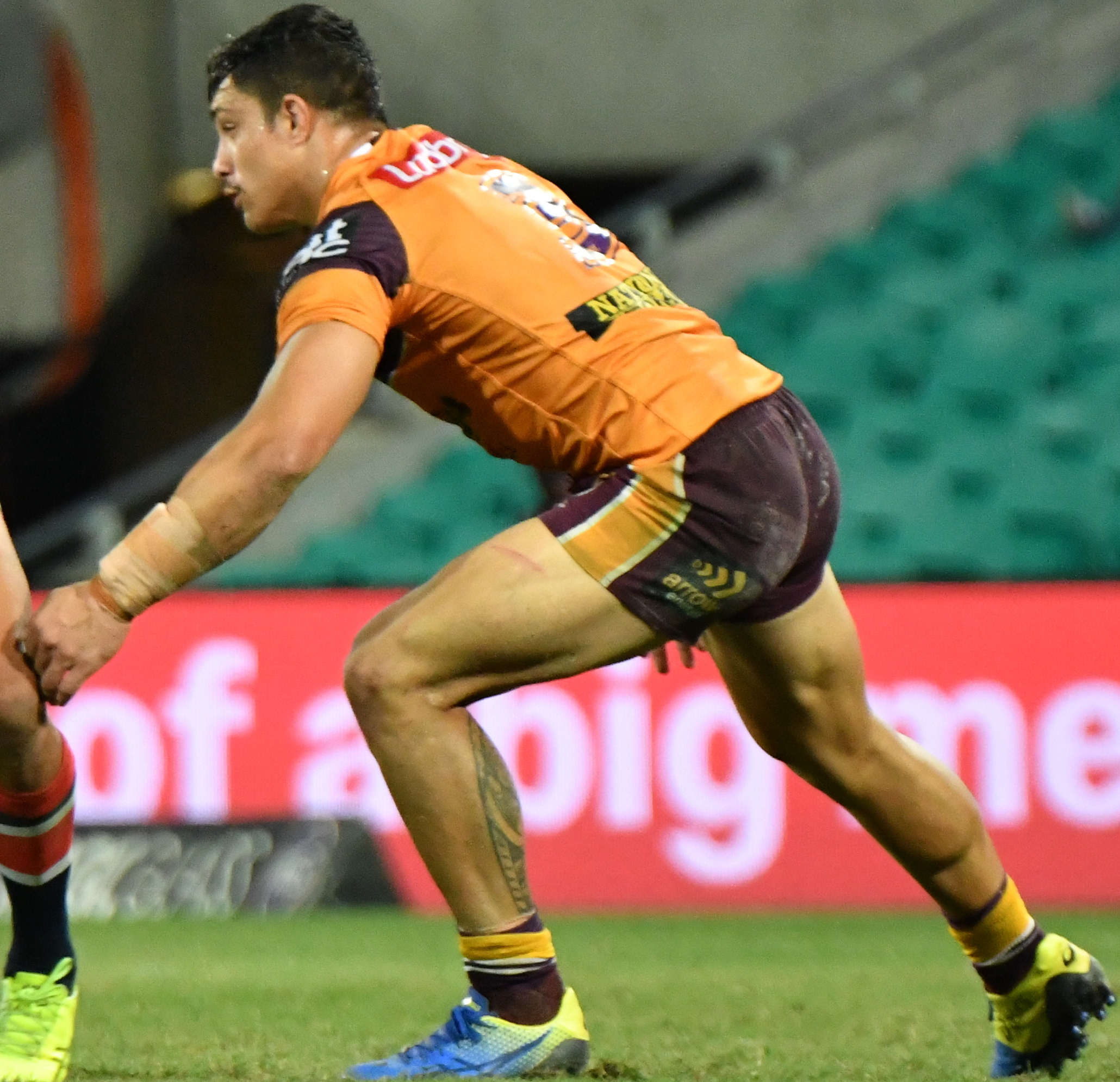
Staggs playing for the Broncos in 2019

On July 7, 2019, Staggs kicked 4 conversions from 4 attempts in the "Baby Broncos"' crucial 2-point win over the Cronulla-Sutherland Sharks in round 16.

Staggs made 24 appearances for Brisbane in the 2019 NRL season as the club finished 8th on the table and qualified for the finals. Staggs played in the club's elimination final against Parramatta which Brisbane lost 58–0 at the new Western Sydney Stadium. The defeat was the worst in Brisbane's history and also the biggest finals defeat in history.

=== 2020 ===
Staggs made 14 appearances for Brisbane in the 2020 NRL season. He finished as the club's top try scorer and top points scorer in a disappointing year as they claimed the wooden spoon for the first time in their history.

=== 2021 ===
In round 20 of the 2021 NRL season, Staggs scored two tries for Brisbane in a 37–18 victory over arch-rivals North Queensland. On 31 July, Staggs was ruled out for the remainder of the season with an MCL injury.

=== 2022 ===
On 29 May, Staggs was selected for the New South Wales rugby league team to play in game one of the 2022 State of Origin series. On 19 June, Staggs was not selected by New South Wales for the second game in the series after New South Wales had lost the opening game 16–10. Staggs played a total of 23 games for Brisbane in the 2022 NRL season as the club finished 9th on the table.

=== 2023 ===
In round 3 of the 2023 NRL season, Staggs scored two tries for Brisbane in a 40–18 victory over St. George Illawarra. In round 5, Staggs scored two tries for Brisbane in their 46–12 victory over the Wests Tigers. In round 21, Staggs scored two tries for Brisbane in their 36–20 victory over South Sydney. Staggs played a total of 26 games for Brisbane in the 2023 NRL season. Staggs played his 100th NRL game in Brisbane's 26-24 loss against Penrith in the 2023 NRL Grand Final.

=== 2024 ===
In round 19 of the 2024 NRL season, Staggs scored two tries in Brisbane's 30-26 loss against St. George Illawarra. In round 23, Staggs scored two tries for Brisbane in their 42-18 victory over arch-rivals North Queensland. Staggs made 21 appearances for Brisbane in the 2024 NRL season which saw the club miss the finals finishing 12th on the table.

=== 2025 ===
On 19 June, the Brisbane outfit announced that Staggs had re-signed with the club until the end of 2028. Staggs played 24 matches for Brisbane in the 2025 NRL season including the clubs 2025 NRL Grand Final victory over Melbourne.

=== 2026 ===
On 19 February, Staggs played in Brisbane's World Club Challenge loss against Hull Kingston Rovers. In May, Staggs was selected by New South Wales for game one in the 2026 State of Origin series. Staggs was retained by New South Wales for game two in which New South Wales suffered a heavy defeat to Queensland. Staggs was one of the New South Wales players not to be selected for game three. Staggs played 20 games for Brisbane in the 2026 NRL season as the club finished 14th on the table. Despite Brisbane's disappointing season, Staggs was picked for Australia ahead of the 2026 Rugby League World Cup. On 15 November 2026, Staggs played in Australia's 2026 Rugby League World Cup final victory over New Zealand.

== Honours ==
Individual

- Brisbane Broncos U20s Best Back: 2017
- Queensland Cup Team Of The Year Centre: 2018
- Brisbane Broncos Best Back: 2019, 2020, 2024, 2025
- Brisbane Broncos Play of The Year: 2020 (Try VS Dragons Round 15), 2023 (Try VS Dolphins Round 4)
- Dally M Centre Of The Year: 2020, 2025
- RLPA Dream Team Centre: 2020
- Carl Webb Medal: 2024, 2025

Team

- Queensland Cup Premiership: 2018
- NRL Premiership: 2025

Representative

- All Stars Test Winner: 2019, 2024
- Ashes Test Series Winner: 2025
- State of Origin Series Winner: 2026
- Rugby League World Cup Winner: 2026

== Statistics ==
| Year | Team | Games | Tries | Goals | Pts |
|---|---|---|---|---|---|
| 2018 | Brisbane Broncos | 9 | 2 | | 8 |
| 2019 | Brisbane Broncos | 24 | 11 | 14 | 72 |
| 2020 | Brisbane Broncos | 14 | 10 | 18 | 76 |
| 2021 | Brisbane Broncos | 4 | 3 | | 12 |
| 2022 | Brisbane Broncos | 23 | 5 | 16 | 52 |
| 2023 | Brisbane Broncos | 26 | 13 | 7 | 66 |
| 2024 | Brisbane Broncos | 21 | 8 | 18 | 68 |
| 2025 | Brisbane Broncos | 24 | 12 | | 48 |
| 2026 | Brisbane Broncos | 21 | 9 | 1 | 38 |
| 2027 | Brisbane Broncos | | | | |
| | Totals | 166 | 73 | 75 | 442 |

== Controversy ==
On 4 August 2020, a sex tape was released featuring Staggs. In a statement made by the Brisbane Broncos, it was reported that it was made without Staggs's consent. "The Brisbane Broncos have been made aware of a video recording involving Kotoni Staggs being circulated on social media," the statement read. "The video is of a highly personal nature and has been released without his consent. The club is working closely with the NRL Integrity Unit, having alerted it as soon as becoming aware of the issue."

On 8 June 2021, Staggs was fined $20,000 and suspended for two matches by the NRL over an off-field incident that occurred in April 2021.
