= Javid Bowen =

Australian rugby league footballer

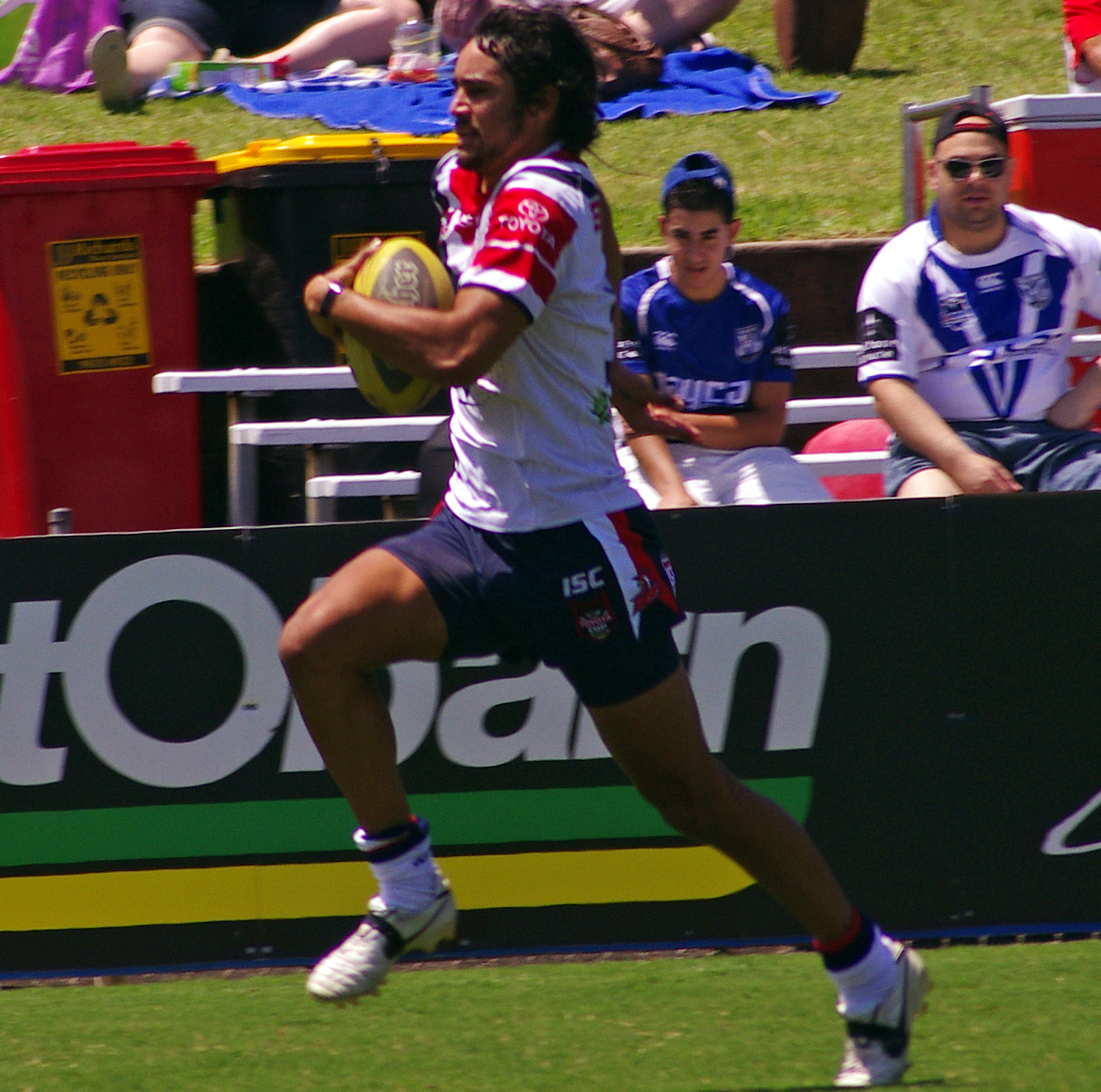

Personal information
- Born: 30 March 1993 (age 32) Cairns, Queensland, Australia
- Height: 193 cm (6 ft 4 in)
- Weight: 96 kg (15 st 2 lb)

Playing information
- Position: Centre, Wing
Club
Years	Team	Pld	T	G	FG	P
2016–21	North Qld Cowboys	45	13	0	0	52
Representative
Years	Team	Pld	T	G	FG	P
2014–15	Queensland Residents	2	2	0	0	8
- Source: As of 6 January 2024
- Relatives: Matt Bowen (uncle); Brenton Bowen (uncle)

Javid Bowen (born 30 March 1993) is an Australian former professional rugby league footballer who played as a centre and winger for the North Queensland Cowboys in the NRL.

== Background ==
Born in Cairns, Queensland, Bowen is of Indigenous Australian and Māori descent. He is the nephew of professional rugby league footballers, Matt and Brenton Bowen. Bowen grew up in the small Cape York Aboriginal community of Hopevale and attended Abergworie College, where he played his junior rugby league.

== Playing career ==
=== Early career ===
After completing his schooling, Bowen was signed by the Sydney Roosters, playing for their SG Ball Cup side in 2011. In early 2012, Bowen returned to Queensland, joining the North Queensland Cowboys and playing for their Under-20s side. He played 30 games between 2012 and 2013, scoring 23 tries and kicking 9 goals for 110 points. In June 2013, his form in the NYC was rewarded with a three-year NRL contract with the North Queensland side, until the end of 2016.

In February 2014, Bowen was a member of North Queensland's NRL Auckland Nines winning side, scoring two tries in the tournament.

Bowen would spend the rest of the 2014 season playing for North Queensland's Queensland Cup affiliate side, the Northern Pride. In July 2014, Bowen represented the Queensland Residents side, scoring a try in their 24-16 win over New South Wales. In September 2014, Bowen was a member of the Northern Pride's Grand Final win over the Easts Tigers, scoring two tries. A week later, Bowen scored a hat trick and was named Man of the Match in the inaugural NRL State Championship game, in which the Pride defeated the Penrith Panthers, 32-28. In his first season at the Pride, Bowen played 23 games and scored 12 tries.

In January 2015, Bowen was a member of the QAS Emerging Maroons squad. Later that month, Bowen was selected in the Cowboys' squad for the 2015 NRL Auckland Nines. Bowen once again spent the season playing for the Northern Pride in the Queensland Cup. In May 2015, Bowen was selected for the Queensland Residents side for the second straight year, scoring a try in their 36-32 win over New South Wales.

=== 2016 ===
In Round 5, Bowen made his first grade debut for the North Queensland Cowboys scoring a try in his side's 36-0 win over the St. George Illawarra Dragons. Bowen finished his first of the NRL season with 4 tries in 10 games, which included starting at centre in two of North Queensland's finals games.

=== 2017 ===
Bowen played 13 games in 2017, scoring three tries. Mainly used as a back-up, he spent time playing for the Northern Pride and filling in at wing and centre for the injured Antonio Winterstein and Justin O'Neill.

=== 2018 ===
Due to an injury to regular starter Kane Linnett, Bowen started the 2018 NRL season at centre, playing in North Queensland's first five games. Following a defeat by the New Zealand Warriors in Round 5, he was sent back to play for the Northern Pride. He would make just one more appearance for the North Queensland Cowboys, in their Round 15 loss to the New Zealand Warriors.

On 11 October, he re-signed with the North Queensland outfit on a one-year deal.

=== 2019 ===
Bowen played just seven games for the North Queensland side in 2019, spending the majority of the season playing for the Northern Pride. For North Queensland, he started six games on the wing and one at centre, scoring two tries.

On 13 September 2019, it was announced that he would not be re-signed by the North Queensland side.

=== 2020 ===
Bowen joined the Northern Pride full-time for the 2020 season, captaining the side. He played just one game for the club that year after the season was cancelled due to the COVID-19 pandemic.

=== 2021 ===
On 3 February, after undertaking pre-season training with the club, Bowen re-joined the North Queensland Cowboys, signing a one-year deal. In Round 9 of the 2021 NRL season, he made his return to the NRL, starting at centre in a 19–18 win over the Brisbane Broncos.

On 26 May, he re-signed with the Cowboys until the end of the 2022 season.

On 19 July, Bowen was ruled out for the remainder of the season after rupturing his ACL and MCL during the club's Round 18 loss to the Sydney Roosters.

On 26 October, Bowen announced his retirement from rugby league due to his knee injury.

== Achievements and accolades ==
=== Individual ===
- North Queensland Cowboys Rookie of the Year: 2016

=== Team ===
- 2014 NRL Auckland Nines: North Queensland Cowboys – Winners

== Statistics ==
=== NRL ===
Statistics are correct to the end of the 2021 season

Season	Team	Matches	T	G	GK %	F/G	Pts
2016	North Queensland	10	4	0	—	0	16
2017	North Queensland	13	3	0	—	0	12
2018	North Queensland	6	1	0	—	0	4
2019	North Queensland	7	2	0	—	0	8
2021	North Queensland	9	3	0	—	0	12
Career totals		45	13	0	—	0	52
