= Jake Granville =

Australian rugby league footballer (born 1989)

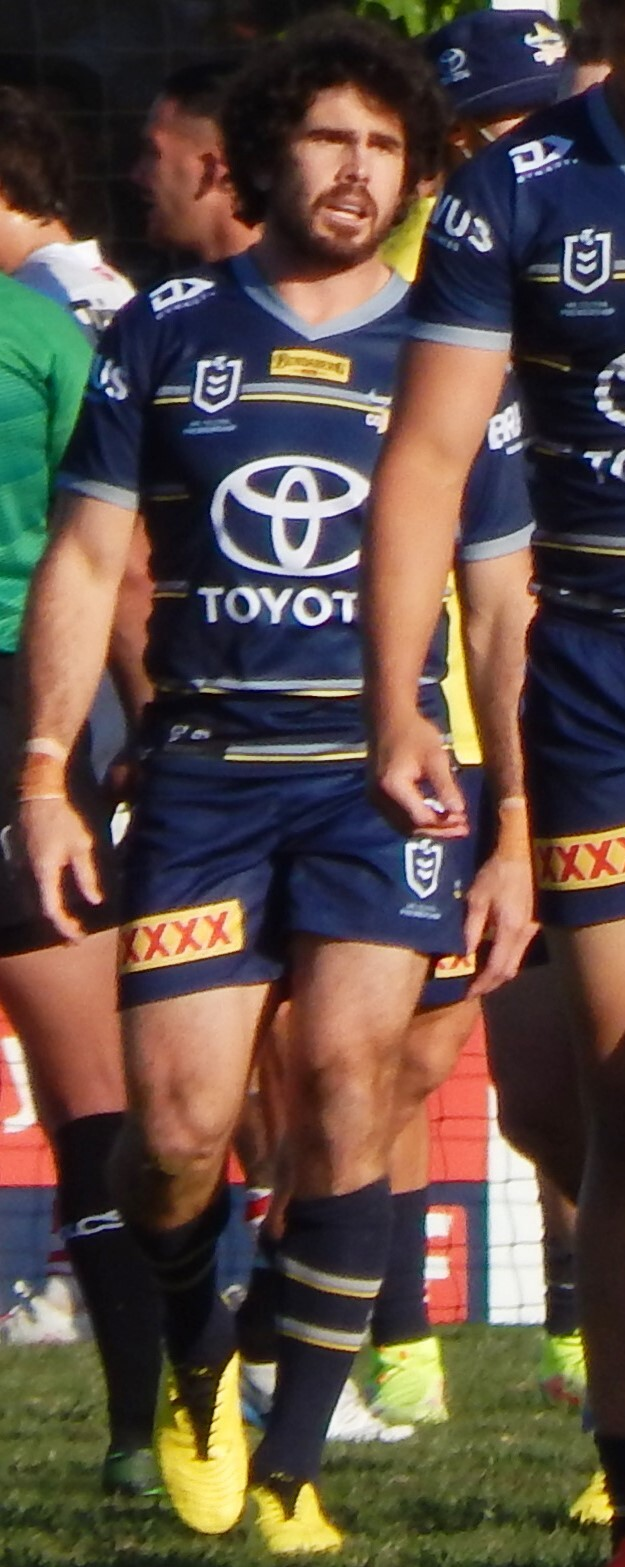

Personal information
- Born: 7 February 1989 (age 37) Rockhampton, Queensland, Australia
- Height: 172 cm (5 ft 8 in)
- Weight: 84 kg (13 st 3 lb)

Playing information
- Position: Hooker
Club
Years	Team	Pld	T	G	FG	P
2013–14	Brisbane Broncos	10	2	0	0	8
2015–24	North Qld Cowboys	207	22	0	0	88
	Total	217	24	0	0	96
Representative
Years	Team	Pld	T	G	FG	P
2012–13	Queensland Residents	2	0	0	0	0
- Source: As of 1 August 2024

Jake Granville (born 7 February 1989) is an Australian former professional rugby league footballer who last played as a utility forward for the North Queensland Cowboys in the National Rugby League (NRL). Earlier in his career, Granville primarily played at hooker, where he won the 2015 NRL Grand Final and 2016 World Club Challenge with North Queensland after previously playing for the Brisbane Broncos. Granville is one of only two players in the NRL era to have started at both fullback and front row, the first being Matt Adamson. Kurt Gidley also played hooker and fullback in the NRL era.

== Background ==
Granville was born in Rockhampton, Queensland, Australia.

He played his junior football for Rockhampton Brothers and attended St Anthony's Catholic Primary School, Rockhampton and St. Brendan's College, Yeppoon, before being signed by the Wynnum Manly Seagulls.

== Playing career ==
=== Early career ===
Granville played for Wynnum's Colts side in 2007, and in 2008, made his Queensland Cup debut for the club.

In 2009, Granville joined the Brisbane Broncos, playing for their NYC team before moving back to Wynnum Manly in 2010. At Wynnum, Granville helped the Seagulls to consecutive Grand Final victories in 2011 and 2012, being named man of the match in 2011, and representing Queensland Residents in 2012. Granville re-joined the Brisbane Broncos in 2013, on a one-year deal.

=== 2013 ===
In Round 10 of the 2013 NRL season, at the age of 24, Granville made his NRL debut for the Brisbane Broncos, coming off the bench in the side's 32–6 win over the Gold Coast Titans. Later that season, he represented the Queensland Residents side for the second time. On 29 August, Granville re-signed with the Brisbane club on a 12-month extension.

=== 2014 ===
In Round 15 of the 2014 NRL season, Granville scored his first NRL try in the Broncos 19–10 loss to the New Zealand Warriors.

A week later in Round 16, Granville was again promoted to the Brisbane starting line-up (after earning his first start against the Warriors in Round 15) against Cronulla, Granville was one of Brisbane's best in the club's two point loss. With regular Hooker Andrew McCullough back from injury in Round 17, Granville's impressive form saw him nail down a spot on the Broncos bench, Granville scored his 2nd NRL try against the Penrith Panthers in Round 17.

On 22 July 2014, Granville signed a two-year contract with the North Queensland Cowboys, linking up with his former Wynnum Manly coach Paul Green.

=== 2015 ===
In Round 1 of the 2015 NRL season, Granville earned a spot on the North Queensland bench, beating Ray Thompson and Lachlan Coote as Paul Green's preferred utility option. By Round 4 of the 2015 NRL season, Granville had solidified himself as North Queensland's starting hooker. Granville scored his first try for North Queensland in Round 6 against South Sydney after a 50-metre break, which included running past Greg Inglis, the Cowboys won the match 30–12. In Round 7, Granville scored a hat-trick, including the game-winning try, in the Cowboys' 28–24 victory over the New Zealand Warriors. Many hailed Granville as the NRL's signing of the season with many pundits stating Granville was the form Hooker of the NRL competition in season 2015. In Round 20 against the Parramatta Eels, Granville took home man of the match honours ahead of Johnathan Thurston in the 46-4 point thrashing. Granville ran for 191 metres (from 12 runs) in this match, to go along with his six tackle breaks, three line breaks, two line break assists, two try assists & a try of his own. On 2 August, Granville was named Cowboys' Members Player of the Year.

On 4 October 2015, Granville was a member of North Queensland's Grand Final winning side, starting a hooker in the side's 17–16 victory over the Brisbane Broncos. Granville set up Justin O'Neill and James Tamou for the Cowboys' first two tries of the match and was a candidate to win the Clive Churchill Medal, which eventually went to co-captain Johnathan Thurston.

At the North Queensland awards night on 9 October, half a week after the club's Grand Final victory, Granville was named North Queensland's Player's Player of the Year. Granville finished runner-up in the Cowboys Player of the Year voting, just falling one point short to co-captain Johnathan Thurston.

On 27 October, The Courier-Mail listed Granville as the NRL's best hooker. On 27 November, Granville extended his contract with the Cowboys to the end of 2018.

=== 2016 ===
On 12 January, Granville was selected in the QAS Emerging Origin squad. On 21 February, he was a member of the Cowboys' 2016 World Club Challenge winning side, starting at hooker in the side's 38–4 victory over the Leeds Rhinos at Headingley Stadium. On 5 May, he was named at hooker in QRL journalist Tony Webeck's Queensland Residents team of the past 10 years.

=== 2017 ===
In January, Granville was once again selected in the QAS Emerging Origin squad. On 1 October, Granville started at hooker in North Queensland's 2017 NRL Grand Final loss to the Melbourne Storm. He finished the 2017 season having playing 24 games, starting all at hooker, and scoring four tries.

=== 2018 ===
Granville played all 24 games for the Cowboys in 2018, starting at hooker in every game and scoring one try. In Round 13, he played his 100th NRL game in the Cowboys' 26–12 win over the Manly-Warringah Sea Eagles. In Round 24, he played his 100th NRL game for the Cowboys in their 44–6 win over the Parramatta Eels. Granville extended his contract with the Cowboys until the end of 2021 Season

=== 2019 ===
For the second consecutive year, Granville played in all 24 of North Queensland's games, starting at hooker in all but one game.

=== 2020 ===
In February, Granville was a member of the Cowboys' 2020 NRL Nines winning squad.

He started the 2020 season as the Cowboys' starting hooker but was dropped in favour of Reece Robson, following the club's Round 4 loss to the Cronulla-Sutherland Sharks. He returned to the side in Round 13, playing just four more games, all off the bench. Granville finished the season having played just eight games, his lowest total since joining the Cowboys in 2015.

=== 2021 ===
In Round 17, Granville played his 150th first grade game for North Queensland. He became the 16th player in the club's history to do so. In Round 19, Granville started at Fullback for the first time in his career finishing the game with 80m run metres and a try assist.

=== 2022 ===
Granville played 14 games for North Queensland in the 2022 NRL season which all came from the interchange bench as the club finished third on the table and qualified for the finals. Granville did not play in either of North Queensland's finals matches which saw them reach the preliminary final before being defeated by Parramatta.

=== 2023 ===
During the season, Granville re-signed with North Queensland on a one-season extension. Granville played 24 matches for North Queensland in the 2023 NRL season as the club finished 11th on the table.

=== 2024 ===
Granville was inducted as a life member of the North Queensland club, and played his 200th game for them in round 5. Granville was ruled out for the rest of the season after suffering a biceps injury. He played 12 games in the 2024 season. On 8 August, Granville announced his departure from North Queensland at the end of the season to continue his career overseas.

== Post playing ==
After his Cowboys departure, Granville was playing in the Atherton Roosters for the A Grade squad in the FNQRL.

In 2025 on NRL Grand Final day, Granville was a part of the players that were honoured as players retired in the current and previous season.

== Achievements and accolades ==
=== Individual ===
- North Queensland Cowboys Players' Player of the Year: 2015
- North Queensland Cowboys Members' Player of the Year: 2015
- North Queensland Cowboys Life Member: 2024

=== Team ===
- 2015 NRL Grand Final: North Queensland Cowboys – Winners
- 2016 World Club Challenge: North Queensland Cowboys – Winners
- 2020 NRL Nines: North Queensland Cowboys – Winners

== Statistics ==
=== NRL ===
Statistics are correct to the end of the 2023 season

†	Denotes seasons in which Granville won an NRL Premiership

Season	Team	Matches	T	G	GK %	F/G	Pts
2013	Brisbane	2	0	0	—	0	0
2014	Brisbane	8	2	0	—	0	8
2015†	North Queensland	28	10	0	—	0	40
2016	North Queensland	25	2	0	—	0	8
2017	North Queensland	24	4	0	—	0	16
2018	North Queensland	24	1	0	—	0	4
2019	North Queensland	24	1	0	—	0	4
2020	North Queensland	8	0	0	—	0	0
2021	North Queensland	24	4				4
2022	North Queensland	14	0				
2023	North Queensland	24					
2024	North Queensland	12					
Career totals		217	24	0	—	0	96

== Personal life ==
Granville is engaged to Zoe Hunt, the sister of his former Brisbane Broncos teammate Ben Hunt.
