= 2017 North Queensland Cowboys season =

Coordinates: 27°27′53″S 153°0′34″E

- NRL Rank: 8th
- Play-off result: Lost Grand Final
- 2017 record: Wins: 13; draws: 0; losses: 11
- Points scored: For: 467; against: 443

Team information
- CEO: Greg Tonner
- Coach: Paul Green
- Captain: Johnathan Thurston Matthew Scott
- Stadium: 1300SMILES Stadium
- Avg. attendance: 16,512
- High attendance: 23,321 (vs. Brisbane Broncos, Round 26)

Top scorers
- Tries: Kyle Feldt (15)
- Goals: Ethan Lowe (47)
- Points: Ethan Lowe (102)
← 2016	2018 →

The 2017 North Queensland Cowboys season was the 23rd in the club's history. This rugby league team is based in Townsville, Queensland, Australia. Coached by Paul Green and co-captained by Johnathan Thurston and Matthew Scott, they competed in the NRL's 2017 Telstra Premiership. The club became just the second 8th-placed side to make the Grand Final, ultimately losing to the Melbourne Storm.

== Season summary ==
=== Milestones ===
- Round 1: Ben Hampton made his debut for the club.
- Round 2: Johnathan Thurston scored his 2,000th point.
- Round 3: Shaun Fensom made his debut for the club.
- Round 3: Kane Linnett played his 150th NRL game.
- Round 4: Kyle Feldt played his 50th game for the club.
- Round 4: Gideon Gela-Mosby made his NRL debut.
- Round 4: Gideon Gela-Mosby and Kalyn Ponga scored their first NRL tries.
- Round 5: Shaun Fensom scored his first try for the club.
- Round 7: Corey Jensen made his NRL debut.
- Round 11: Ben Hampton scored his first try for the club.
- Round 15: Kyle Laybutt made his NRL debut.
- Round 16: Gavin Cooper played his 250th NRL game.
- Round 17: Te Maire Martin made his debut for the club.
- Round 17: Te Maire Martin scored his first try for the club.
- Round 17: Shaun Fensom played his 150th NRL game.
- Round 21: Braden Uele made his NRL debut.
- Round 21: Paul Green coached his 100th NRL game.
- Round 22: Lachlan Coote played his 150th NRL game.
- Round 23: Patrick Mago made his NRL debut.
- Round 23: Michael Morgan scored his 50th try for the club.
- Round 24: Scott Bolton played his 200th game for the club.
- Round 24: Enari Tuala and Shane Wright made their NRL debuts.
- Finals Week 2: Kane Linnett played his 150th game for the club.
- Finals Week 2: John Asiata scored his first NRL try.
- Finals Week 3: Antonio Winterstein played his 150th game for the club.
- Finals Week 3: The club qualified for their third Grand Final.

=== Squad ===
North Queensland Cowboys NRL Squad 2017
First team squad			Coaching staff
John Asiata – PR, FE; Scott Bolton – PR; Javid Bowen – CE, WG; Josh Chudleigh – HK; Gavin Cooper – SR; Lachlan Coote – FB; Kyle Feldt – WG; Shaun Fensom – LK, PR; Gideon Gela-Mosby – WG; Jake Granville – HK; Ben Hampton – HB, HK; Coen Hess – SR	Sam Hoare – PR; Shaun Hudson – CE; Corey Jensen – PR; Marcus Jensen – WG; Patrick Kaufusi – PR; Kyle Laybutt – FE, HB; Blake Leary – SR, HK; Kane Linnett – CE, SR; Ethan Lowe – SR; Patrick Mago – SR; Te Maire Martin – FE; Michael Morgan – FE, HB	Justin O'Neill – CE; Kalyn Ponga – FB; Matthew Scott (c) – PR; Ben Spina – LK, PR; Jason Taumalolo – LK; Ray Thompson – HK, HB; Johnathan Thurston (c) – HB; Enari Tuala – CE; Braden Uele – PR; Antonio Winterstein – WG, CE; Shane Wright – SR	Head coach: Paul Green; Assistant coaches: David Fairleigh (assistant coach); Todd Payten (assistant coach); Josh Hannay (assistant coach); Paul Bowman (high performance manager); Mark Henry (assistant strength & conditioning coach); Ashley Graham (elite pathways performance coach); Anthony Wood (rehabilitation manager); Steve Sartori (physiotherapist); Legend: (c) Captain(s); (vc) Vice-captain(s); Updated: 6 March 2017; Source(s): Cowboys Squad 2017

== Squad movement ==
=== Gains ===
Player	Signed From	Until end of	Notes
Ben Hampton	Melbourne Storm	2019	
Shaun Fensom	Canberra Raiders	2018	
Corey Jensen	Townsville Blackhawks	2017	
Blake Leary	Manly Sea Eagles	2017	
Te Maire Martin	Penrith Panthers (mid-season)	2019	
Shane Wright	Gold Coast Titans	2018	

=== Losses ===
Player	Signed To	Until end of	Notes
Ben Hannant	Retired	-	
Jahrome Hughes	Melbourne Storm	2018	
Rory Kostjasyn	Newcastle Knights	2018	
Nick Lui-Toso	Penrith Panthers	2017	
Tautau Moga	Brisbane Broncos	2018	
Brandon Smith	Melbourne Storm	2019	
James Tamou	Penrith Panthers	2020	

=== Re-signings ===
Player	Club	Until end of	Notes
John Asiata	North Queensland Cowboys	2020	
Scott Bolton	North Queensland Cowboys	2019	
Jake Clifford	North Queensland Cowboys	2019	
Gavin Cooper	North Queensland Cowboys	2019	
Kyle Feldt	North Queensland Cowboys	2020	
Gideon Gela-Mosby	North Queensland Cowboys	2019	
Shaun Hudson	North Queensland Cowboys	2018	
Corey Jensen	North Queensland Cowboys	2019	
Kyle Laybutt	North Queensland Cowboys	2018	
Emry Pere	North Queensland Cowboys	2018	
Matthew Scott	North Queensland Cowboys	2019	
Murray Taulagi	North Queensland Cowboys	2019	
Jason Taumalolo	North Queensland Cowboys	2027	
Johnathan Thurston	North Queensland Cowboys	2018	
Enari Tuala	North Queensland Cowboys	2019	

== Ladder ==
2017 NRL season
Pos	Team	Pld	W	D	L	B	PF	PA	PD	Pts
1	Melbourne Storm (P)	24	20	0	4	2	633	336	+297	44
2	Sydney Roosters	24	17	0	7	2	500	428	+72	38
3	Brisbane Broncos	24	16	0	8	2	597	433	+164	36
4	Parramatta Eels	24	16	0	8	2	496	457	+39	36
5	Cronulla-Sutherland Sharks	24	15	0	9	2	476	407	+69	34
6	Manly-Warringah Sea Eagles	24	14	0	10	2	552	512	+40	32
7	Penrith Panthers	24	13	0	11	2	504	459	+45	30
8	North Queensland Cowboys	24	13	0	11	2	467	443	+24	30
9	St. George Illawarra Dragons	24	12	0	12	2	533	450	+83	28
10	Canberra Raiders	24	11	0	13	2	558	497	+61	26
11	Canterbury-Bankstown Bulldogs	24	10	0	14	2	360	455	−95	24
12	South Sydney Rabbitohs	24	9	0	15	2	464	564	−100	22
13	New Zealand Warriors	24	7	0	17	2	444	575	−131	18
14	Wests Tigers	24	7	0	17	2	413	571	−158	18
15	Gold Coast Titans	24	7	0	17	2	448	638	−190	18
16	Newcastle Knights	24	5	0	19	2	428	648	−220	14

== Fixtures ==
=== NRL Auckland Nines ===
The NRL Auckland Nines is a pre-season rugby league nines competition featuring all 16 NRL clubs.

==== Pool Play ====
Date	Time (Local)	Round	Opponent	Venue	Score	Tries	Goals
Saturday, 4 February	2:40 pm	Round 1	Sydney Roosters	Eden Park	27 – 15	Gela-Mosby (3), Morgan, O'Neill, Ponga	Thurston (1)
Saturday, 4 February	4:35 pm	Round 2	Canberra Raiders	Eden Park	35 – 6	Gela-Mosby (2), Ponga (2), Bowen, Feldt	Bowen (1), Morgan (1), Ponga (1), Thurston (1)
Sunday, 5 February	11:05 am	Round 3	South Sydney Rabbitohs	Eden Park	19 – 8	Bowen (2), Hudson, Ponga	Ponga (1)
Sunday, 7 February	2:30 pm	Quarter-final	Melbourne Storm	Eden Park	12 – 25	Bowen, Gela-Mosby, Ponga	
Legend: Win Loss

=== Pre-season ===
Date	Round	Opponent	Venue	Score	Tries	Goals	Attendance
Saturday, 11 February	Trial 1	Sydney Roosters	BB Print Stadium	11 – 10	Leary, Tuala	Laybutt (1/2, 1 FG)	
Friday, 17 February	Trial 2	Wests Tigers	Campbelltown Stadium	18 – 16	Hampton, Linnett, Morgan	Thurston (3/3)	
Friday, 17 February	Trial 3	Townsville Blackhawks	Jack Manski Oval	44 – 8	Ponga (3), Traill (2), Gahan, Slade-Roycroft, Pere	-	
Legend: Win Loss Draw

=== Regular season ===
Date	Round	Opponent	Venue	Score	Tries	Goals	Attendance
Saturday, 4 March	Round 1	Canberra Raiders	1300SMILES Stadium	20 – 16	Bowen, Cooper, Coote, Hess	Thurston (2/4)	17,548
Friday, 10 March	Round 2	Brisbane Broncos	Suncorp Stadium	21 – 20	Granville, Hess, Morgan	Thurston (4/4, 1 FG)	47,703
Saturday, 18 March	Round 3	Manly Sea Eagles	1300SMILES Stadium	8 – 30	Granville	Thurston (2/2)	14,763
Saturday, 25 March	Round 4	Gold Coast Titans	Cbus Super Stadium	32 – 26	Hess (2), Gela-Mosby, Ponga, Thurston	Thurston (6/7)	17,647
Friday, 31 March	Round 5	South Sydney Rabbitohs	1300SMILES Stadium	20 – 6	Fensom, Gela-Mosby, Morgan	Thurston (4/4)	13,671
Saturday, 8 April	Round 6	Wests Tigers	1300SMILES Stadium	16 – 26	Hess (2), Taumalolo	Thurston (2/3)	15,424
Saturday, 15 April	Round 7	St George Illawarra Dragons	WIN Stadium	22 – 28	Bolton, Gela-Mosby, Morgan, Spina	Feldt (3/4)	13,886
Saturday, 22 April	Round 8	Newcastle Knights	1300SMILES Stadium	24 – 12	Ponga (2), Cooper, Linnett	Lowe (2/2), Feldt (2/4)	13,678
Friday, 28 April	Round 9	Parramatta Eels	1300SMILES Stadium	6 – 26	Winterstein	Feldt (1/1)	14,247
Thursday, 11 May	Round 10	Canterbury Bulldogs	ANZ Stadium	30 –14	Hess (2), Feldt, Morgan, Spina	Lowe (4/5), Feldt (1/1)	8,122
Thursday, 18 May	Round 11	Cronulla Sharks	Southern Cross Group Stadium	14 – 18	Feldt, Hampton, Winterstein	Feldt (1/2), Lowe (0/2)	8,557
	Round 12	Bye					
Saturday, 3 June	Round 13	Gold Coast Titans	1300SMILES Stadium	20 – 8	Feldt, Hess, Morgan	Feldt (4/6)	14,612
Saturday, 10 June	Round 14	Parramatta Eels	TIO Stadium	32 – 6	Feldt (2), Hess, Thurston, Winterstein	Thurston (6/7)	11,968
Saturday, 17 June	Round 15	Melbourne Storm	AAMI Park	22 – 23	Coote, Feldt, Linnett	Feldt (5/6)	17,124
Saturday, 24 June	Round 16	Penrith Panthers	1300SMILES Stadium	14 – 12	Feldt, Jensen	Lowe (3/3)	17,876
Saturday, 1 July	Round 17	Canberra Raiders	GIO Stadium	31 – 18	Martin (2), Morgan (2), Winterstein	Lowe (5/6), Coote (1 FG)	10,266
	Round 18	Bye					
Sunday, 16 July	Round 19	South Sydney Rabbitohs	Barlow Park	23 – 10	Feldt, Granville, Hess, Taumalolo	Lowe (3/4), Coote (1 FG)	11,217
Saturday, 22 July	Round 20	Warriors	1300SMILES Stadium	24 – 12	Bowen (2), Lowe, O'Neill	Lowe (4/5)	16,080
Saturday, 29 July	Round 21	Sydney Roosters	Allianz Stadium	16 – 22	Feldt, Hess, Linnett	Lowe (2/3)	9,476
Friday, 4 August	Round 22	Melbourne Storm	1300SMILES Stadium	8 – 26	Granville	Lowe (2/2)	21,380
Saturday, 12 August	Round 23	Penrith Panthers	Pepper Stadium	16 – 24	Linnett, Morgan, Taumalolo	Lowe (2/3)	12,357
Saturday, 19 August	Round 24	Cronulla Sharks	1300SMILES Stadium	16 – 26	Lowe, Martin, Morgan	Lowe (2/3)	15,539
Friday, 25 August	Round 25	Wests Tigers	Campbelltown Stadium	22 – 14	Feldt (2), Martin, Morgan	Lowe (3/4)	9,436
Thursday, 31 August	Round 26	Brisbane Broncos	1300SMILES Stadium	10 – 20	Cooper, Feldt	Lowe (1/2)	23,321
Legend: Win Loss Draw Bye

=== Finals ===
Qualifying and elimination finals
9 September – Melbourne
1	Melbourne Storm	18
4	Parramatta Eels	16
10 September – Sydney
5	Cronulla-Sutherland Sharks	14
8	North Queensland Cowboys	15
9 September – Sydney
6	Manly-Warringah Sea Eagles	10
7	Penrith Panthers	22
8 September – Sydney
2	Sydney Roosters	24
3	Brisbane Broncos	22

Semi-finals
16 September – Sydney
Parramatta Eels	16
North Queensland Cowboys	24
15 September – Brisbane
Brisbane Broncos	13
Penrith Panthers	6

Preliminary finals
22 September – Melbourne
Melbourne Storm	30
Brisbane Broncos	0
23 September – Sydney
Sydney Roosters	16
North Queensland Cowboys	29

Grand final
1 October – Sydney
Melbourne Storm	34
North Queensland Cowboys	6

Date	Round	Opponent	Venue	Score	Tries	Goals	Attendance
Sunday, 10 September	Elimination Final	Cronulla Sharks	Allianz Stadium	15 – 14	Feldt, Taumalolo	Lowe (3/4), Morgan (1 FG)	16,115
Saturday, 16 September	Semi Final	Parramatta Eels	ANZ Stadium	24 – 16	Asiata, Feldt, Hess, Morgan	Lowe (4/4)	41,287
Saturday, 23 September	Preliminary Final	Sydney Roosters	Allianz Stadium	29 – 16	Bolton, Feldt, Linnett, Martin	Lowe (6/6), Morgan (1 FG)	28,108
Sunday, 1 October	Grand Final	Melbourne Storm	ANZ Stadium	6 – 34	Martin	Lowe (1/1)	79,722
Legend: Win Loss Draw

== Statistics ==
Name	App	T	G	FG	Pts
John Asiata	28	1	-	-	4
Scott Bolton	28	2	-	-	8
Javid Bowen	13	3	-	-	12
Gavin Cooper	25	3	-	-	12
Lachlan Coote	21	2	-	2	10
Kyle Feldt	28	15	17	-	94
Shaun Fensom	21	1	-	-	4
Gideon Gela-Mosby	4	3	-	-	12
Jake Granville	24	4	-	-	16
Ben Hampton	26	1	-	-	4
Coen Hess	27	13	-	-	52
Sam Hoare	4	-	-	-	-
Corey Jensen	18	1	-	-	4
Patrick Kaufusi	9	-	-	-	-
Kyle Laybutt	2	-	-	-	-
Blake Leary	3	-	-	-	-
Kane Linnett	28	5	-	-	20
Ethan Lowe	28	2	47	-	102
Patrick Mago	2	-	-	-	-
Te Maire Martin	12	6	-	-	24
Michael Morgan	27	11	-	2	46
Justin O'Neill	20	1	-	-	4
Kalyn Ponga	7	3	-	-	12
Matthew Scott	2	-	-	-	-
Ben Spina	8	2	-	-	8
Jason Taumalolo	26	4	-	-	16
Ray Thompson	6	-	-	-	-
Johnathan Thurston	7	2	26	1	61
Enari Tuala	1	-	-	-	-
Braden Uele	1	-	-	-	-
Antonio Winterstein	19	4	-	-	16
Shane Wright	1	-	-	-	-
Totals		89	90	3	541

== Representatives ==
The following players have played a representative match in 2017.

	All Stars match	ANZAC Test	Pacific Tests	Residents match	State of Origin 1	State Of Origin 2	State of Origin 3	World Cup
John Asiata	-	-	Samoa	-	-	-	-	-
Gavin Cooper	World All Stars	-	-	-	-	Queensland	Queensland	-
Coen Hess	-	-	-	-	-	Queensland	Queensland	-
Patrick Kaufusi	-	-	Tonga	-	-	-	-	-
Kyle Laybutt	-	-	-	Queensland	-	-	-	-
Blake Leary	-	-	-	Queensland	-	-	-	-
Te Maire Martin	-	-	-	-	-	-	-	New Zealand
Michael Morgan	-	Australia	-	-	Queensland	Queensland	Queensland	Australia
Justin O'Neill	-	-	-	-	Queensland	-	-	-
Jason Taumalolo	-	New Zealand	-	-	-	-	-	Tonga
Johnathan Thurston	Indigenous All Stars	Australia	-	-	-	Queensland	-	-
Antonio Winterstein	-	-	Samoa	-	-	-	-	-

== Honours ==
=== League ===
- Dally M Halfback of the Year: Michael Morgan
- Dally M Try of the Year: Kyle Feldt
- Dally M NYC Player of the Year: Jake Clifford
- NYC Team of the Year: Jake Clifford, Kalyn Ponga

=== Club ===
- Paul Bowman Medal: Jason Taumalolo
- Players' Player: Michael Morgan and Jason Taumalolo
- Coach's Award: Michael Morgan
- Member's Player of the Year: Michael Morgan
- Club Person of the Year: Scott Bolton and Ray Thompson
- Rookie of the Year: Corey Jensen
- NYC Player of the Year: Kurt Wiltshire
- Townsville Bulletins' Fan Choice Award: Michael Morgan

== Feeder clubs ==
=== National Youth Competition ===
- North Queensland Cowboys - 5th, lost elimination final

=== Queensland Cup ===
- Mackay Cutters - 8th, missed finals
- Northern Pride - 12th, missed finals
- Townsville Blackhawks - 6th, lost elimination final
