= Shaun Fensom =

Australian rugby league footballer

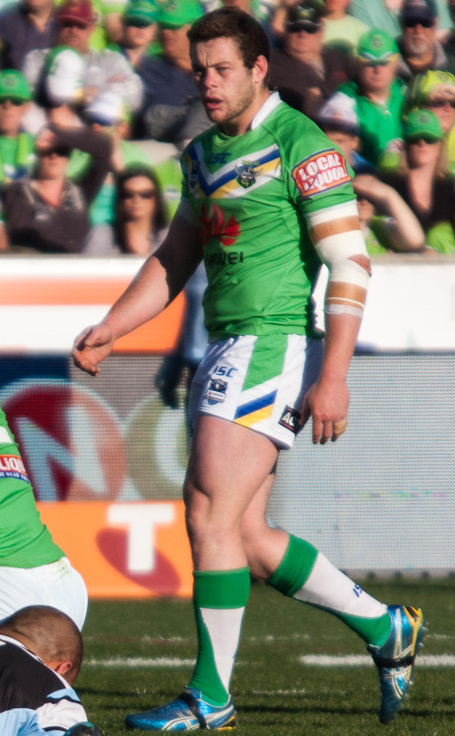

Personal information
- Born: 10 October 1988 (age 38) Camden, New South Wales, Australia

Playing information
- Height: 182 cm (6 ft 0 in)
- Weight: 100 kg (15 st 10 lb)
- Position: Lock
Club
Years	Team	Pld	T	G	FG	P
2009–16	Canberra Raiders	139	14	0	0	56
2017–18	North Qld Cowboys	35	2	0	0	8
2019	Brisbane Broncos	2	0	0	0	0
	Total	176	16	0	0	64

Shaun Fensom (born 10 October 1988) is an Australian former professional rugby league footballer who played as a lock and second-row forward in the 2000s and 2010s.

He played for the Canberra Raiders, North Queensland Cowboys and the Brisbane Broncos in the NRL.

== Background ==
Fensom was born in Camden, New South Wales, Australia in Sydney's south-west and grew up in Urunga on New South Wales' mid north coast.

He played his junior rugby league for the Bellingen Dorrigo Magpies.

In 2005, Fensom was a member of the Brisbane Broncos talent squad before joining the Canberra Raiders.

== Playing career ==
=== Canberra Raiders ===
In 2007, Fensom joined the Canberra Raiders, playing for their Jersey Flegg Cup side. In 2008, he captained the Raiders' in the inaugural National Youth Competition season, starting at lock in their Grand Final victory over the Brisbane Broncos. He was named at lock in the Toyota Cup Team of the Year.

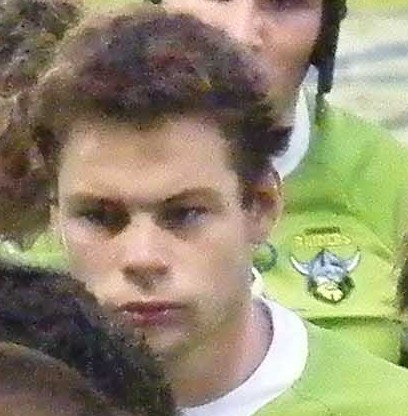
Fensom playing for the Canberra Raiders

In Round 5 of the 2009 NRL season, Fensom made his NRL debut for the Raiders, coming off the bench in their 24-14 win over the Cronulla Sharks. He made his only other appearance that season a week later. In Round 4 of the 2010 NRL season, he scored his first NRL try, against the Wests Tigers.

In Round 11 of the 2011 NRL season, Fensom equaled Nathan Hindmarsh's world record for the most tackles made in a single rugby league game: when he made 75 tackles against the Canterbury-Bankstown Bulldogs. He went on to make a club record 1135 tackles for the season, breaking the record previously held by Alan Tongue.

Fensom won consecutive Mal Meninga Medals for Raiders' Player of the Year in the 2011 and 2012 seasons, becoming the 6th player in history to receive the award two years in a row. In 2011, Fensom received 24 votes, which was nine ahead of second-placed Dane Tilse with 15. He was also the winner of the 2011 "Tradies" Raider of the Year award, which is voted on by The Canberra Times rugby league reporters. Fensom finished with 25 points at the end of the 2012 season, five ahead of Reece Robinson.

Fensom is known for his extremely high work rate, particularly in regards to tackling. In the 2012 season, he averaged 43.3 tackles per game. Fensom ended the 2013 season having played 20 games, averaging 100 metres and 44 tackles per game whilst also knocking on the door of New South Wales Origin selection.

In 2014, Fensom played 18 games in an injury interrupted season, once again averaging over 40 tackles a game. In 2015, Fensom played all but one game for Canberra.

In 2016, Fensom broke his arm during the pre-season but managed to be fully fit for their Round 1 clash against the Penrith Panthers in which he received man of the match honours, scoring the match winning try as well as running for 135 metres and ending the game with 38 tackles. Fensom lost his first grade spot midway through the 2016 season, playing just 14 games. He spent the back end of the season playing for Canberra's Intrust Super Premiership side Mounties, playing in their Grand Final side.

=== North Queensland Cowboys ===
On 24 February 2017, Fensom was released from the final year of his Raiders' contract due to salary cap pressures, signing a two-year deal with the North Queensland Cowboys. He started the season playing for the Cowboys' feeder club, the Townsville Blackhawks in the Queensland Cup. In Round 3 of the 2017 NRL season, he made his Cowboys debut in a loss to the Manly Sea Eagles. In Round 5, he scored his first try for the club in a 20-6 win over South Sydney.

On 1 October 2017, Fensom started at prop in the Cowboys' 2017 NRL Grand Final loss to the Melbourne Storm. He was stretchered from the field three minutes into the game after colliding with teammate Ethan Lowe, breaking his tibia and fibula. As he left the field, he gave the crowd a thumbs up and gestured towards the Cowboys' fans to cheer.

In Round 8 of the 2018 NRL season, Fensom returned from his injury in the Cowboys' 18-8 loss to Canberra. He scored his second try for the Cowboys in their Round 25 win over the Gold Coast Titans.

On 13 September 2018, he was announced by the Cowboys as one of nine players leaving the club at the end of the 2018 season.

=== Brisbane Broncos ===
On 7 January 2019, Fensom signed a one-year contract with the Brisbane Broncos. Fensom retired from the NRL at the end of the 2019 season.

== Post playing ==
Fensom after retiring from the NRL joined the Belconnen United Sharks in the Canberra Raiders Cup playing for the squad in 2019.

== Achievements and accolades ==
=== Individual ===
- Mal Meninga Medal: 2011, 2012
- Canberra Raiders' Fred Daly Clubman of the Year: 2014
- Canberra Raiders' NYC Player of the Year: 2008
- NYC Team of the Year: 2008

=== Team ===
- NYC Grand Final: Canberra Raiders – Winners

== Statistics ==
=== NRL ===
Statistics are correct to the end of the 2019 season

Season	Team	Matches	T	G	GK %	F/G	Pts
2009	Canberra	2	0	0	—	0	0
2010	Canberra	14	2	0	—	0	8
2011	Canberra	24	3	0	—	0	12
2012	Canberra	22	3	0	—	0	12
2013	Canberra	20	0	0	—	0	0
2014	Canberra	18	2	0	—	0	8
2015	Canberra	23	3	0	—	0	12
2016	Canberra	14	1	0	—	0	4
2017	North Queensland	23	3	0	—	0	12
2018	North Queensland	14	1	0	—	0	4
2019	Brisbane Broncos	2	0				
Career totals		176	16	0	—	0	64

== Personal life ==
Fensom and his wife, Leah, have three children: a daughter, Elsie, and twin sons, Cruz and Leo.
