= Gavin Cooper =

Australian rugby league player

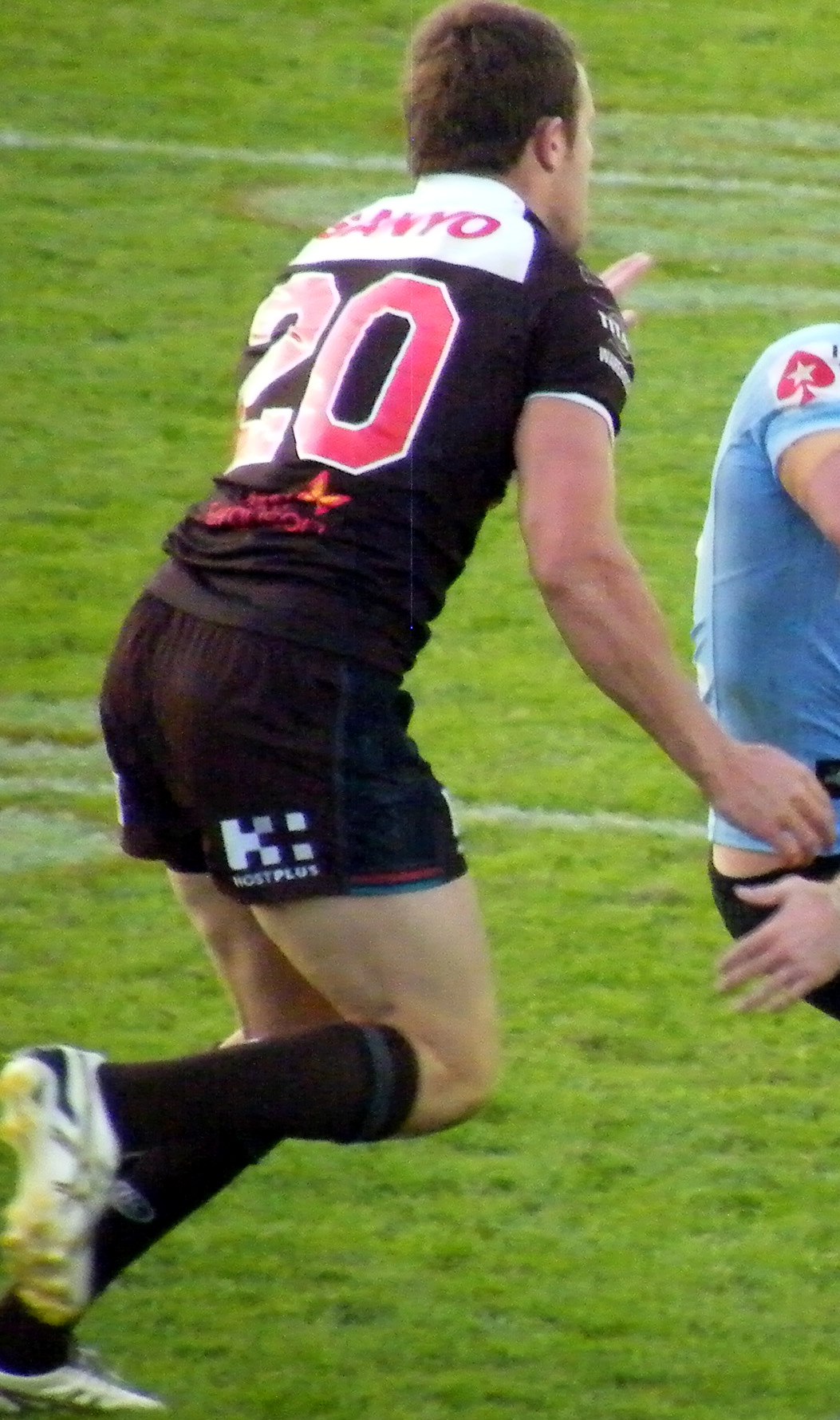

Personal information
- Born: 19 August 1985 (age 41) Murgon, Queensland, Australia
- Height: 197 cm (6 ft 6 in)
- Weight: 108 kg (17 st 0 lb)

Playing information
- Position: Second-row, Centre
Club
| Years | Team | Pld | T | G | FG | P |
|---|---|---|---|---|---|---|
| 2006 | North Qld Cowboys | 18 | 3 | 0 | 0 | 12 |
| 2007–08 | Gold Coast Titans | 36 | 3 | 0 | 0 | 12 |
| 2009–10 | Penrith Panthers | 40 | 4 | 1 | 0 | 18 |
| 2011–20 | North Qld Cowboys | 229 | 69 | 2 | 0 | 280 |
| | Total | 323 | 79 | 3 | 0 | 322 |
Representative
| Years | Team | Pld | T | G | FG | P |
| 2013 | Prime Minister's XIII | 1 | 0 | 0 | 0 | 0 |
| 2016–18 | Queensland | 6 | 1 | 0 | 0 | 4 |
| 2017 | World All Stars | 1 | 0 | 0 | 0 | 0 |
- Source: As of 19 November 2020

Gavin Cooper (born 19 August 1985) is an Australian former professional rugby league footballer who played as a second-row for the North Queensland Cowboys, Gold Coast Titans and Penrith Panthers in the NRL.

He started in the second row in the Cowboys' 2015 NRL Grand Final and 2016 World Club Challenge winning sides. Cooper played for Prime Minister's XIII, Queensland in the State of Origin series and the World All Stars side, and played as a centre earlier in his career.

== Background ==
Cooper was born in Murgon, Queensland, Australia.

He played his junior football for the Murgon Mustangs and joined the Redcliffe Dolphins as a teenager. In 2003, he was a member of the Dolphins' premiership-winning FOGS Colts team and named man of the match. In 2004, Cooper graduated to the Dolphins' Queensland Cup side, playing for them 13 times and represented the Queensland under-19 team. In August 2004, he signed with the North Queensland Cowboys for the 2005 season.

In 2005, Cooper played for the Cowboys' Queensland Cup side, the North Queensland Young Guns. He was a member of the Young Guns premiership-winning side that season, playing alongside future Cowboys teammates Scott Bolton and Matthew Scott

== Playing career ==
=== 2006 ===
In Round 2 of the 2006 NRL season, Cooper made his NRL debut for the Cowboys in their 20–16 victory over the Manly Sea Eagles. He played 18 games in his rookie season, scoring 3 tries, but would sign with the newly established Gold Coast Titans in July of that year, on a two-year deal.

=== 2007–2008 ===
After a solid season for the Gold Coast Titans in 2007, Cooper fell out of favour in 2008, only playing 14 NRL games and spending time with the Titans Queensland Cup affiliate, the Ipswich Jets. He was not offered a new deal by the club and subsequently signed with the Penrith Panthers until the end of 2010.

=== 2009–2010 ===
In 2009, Cooper played 22 games with the Panthers, switching between the second-row and centre throughout the season. In 2010, he played 18 games, mainly off the bench, and played in his first NRL final series. On 27 August, Cooper re-joined the North Queensland Cowboys, signing a two-year deal with club as it underwent a total overhaul.

=== 2011 ===
In Round 7 of the 2011 NRL season, Cooper played his 100th NRL game in the Cowboys 30–12 victory over the Cronulla Sharks. He played 24 games in his first season back at the Cowboys, cementing his spot in the starting line-up at second-row. He won the Clubman of the Year award at the team's annual presentation ball at the end of the year.

=== 2012 ===
In 2012, Cooper started at second-row in every game for the Cowboys. He set a new record for the most tries in a season scored by a Cowboys' forward, with 10, beating teammate Scott Bolton's record of 7 tries in 2010. On 15 May, he re-signed with the Cowboys for a further two seasons.

=== 2013 ===
After a solid season in which he played 22 games and scored 7 tries, Cooper earned his first senior representative jersey when he was selected to play alongside teammate James Tamou for the Prime Minister's XIII in their annual match against Papua New Guinea. He came off the bench in side's 50–10 win and was selected in the Australian World Cup train-on squad.

=== 2014 ===
Cooper captained the Cowboys in the 2014 Auckland Nines. The side won the tournament, defeating the Brisbane Broncos in the final, with Cooper being named in the Team of the Tournament. On 12 May, Cooper re-signed with the Cowboys until the end of 2017. A week later, Cooper dislocated his hip against the Sydney Roosters and was ruled out for 3 months. The injury cruelled his State of Origin chances after many pundits believed he was a definite starter come game I. He returned in Round 21 and was selected at the end of the season in the Australian Four Nations train-on squad.

=== 2015 ===
In January 2015, Cooper was a member of the QAS Emerging Origin squad for the first time, at age 29. Later that month, he captained the Cowboys Auckland Nines side for the second year in a row.

In Round 11 of the 2015 NRL season, Cooper captained the Cowboys for the first time in the side's 8–0 victory over the Wests Tigers. After the Cowboys' 39–0 win over the Cronulla-Sutherland Sharks in Week 2 of the 2015 NRL finals series, a Courier Mail article listed Cooper as the most underrated player in the competition. On 25 September, Cooper was named in Fox Sports' People's Choice Team of the Year.

On 4 October 2015, Cooper was a member of the Cowboys' Grand Final winning side, starting at second row in the side's 17–16 victory over the Brisbane Broncos.

Cooper scored 11 tries in the regular season, the most of any backrower in the NRL.

=== 2016 ===
In February 2016, Cooper captained the Cowboys again in the Auckland Nines. On 21 February 2016, Cooper was a member of the Cowboys' World Club Challenge winning side, starting at second row in the side's 38–4 victory over the Leeds Rhinos at Headingley Stadium. In mid April it was reported that Gavin Cooper would be a bolter for the Australian Test Team, he would just miss out on selection with Cowboys coach Paul Green going on the record and saying "I feel sorry for Coops every year around rep time. His name always gets mentioned and it happened again this year but unfortunately he didn't make the team. He's a terrific bloke and one of our leaders here I don't have to talk about how good a player he is. He wouldn't let anyone down. Hopefully he keeps doing the right thing. I am sure he will get an opportunity at some stage".

On 30 May, Cooper was announced as Queensland's 18th man for Game 1 of the 2016 State of Origin series. On 13 July, he made his debut for Queensland in Game 3 of the series, scoring a try

Cooper played 26 games for the Cowboys in 2016, captaining the side against the St George Illawarra Dragons in Round 12.

=== 2017 ===
In February, Cooper played for the World All Stars against the Indigenous All Stars, before captaining the Cowboys in the Auckland Nines tournament. In mid-June, Cooper was recalled to the Queensland Maroons side for Game II of the 2017 State of Origin series. Queensland went on to win the game 18–16, with Cooper starting at second row and playing 80 minutes, where he recorded 12 runs for 110 metres along with 47 tackles. In Round 16 of the 2017 NRL season, Cooper captained the Cowboys in his 250th NRL game, in which they defeated the Penrith Panthers 14–12.

After club co-captains Johnathan Thurston and Matthew Scott were ruled out with season-ending injuries, Cooper took over the role. On 1 October, he captained the club in the 2017 NRL Grand Final, which they lost to the Melbourne Storm.

=== 2018 ===
In Round 16, Cooper played his 200th NRL game for the Cowboys in their 21–20 loss to South Sydney. He once again represented Queensland, playing in his first full State of Origin series, starting at second row in all three games.

In Round 25, Cooper became the first forward to score a try in nine straight games, breaking the record originally set by ARL Team of the Century prop and Immortal Frank Burge in 1918. The try was set up by Johnathan Thurston in his final NRL game, making it the 350th and final try assist of Thurston's career.

Cooper ended the 2018 season with 13 tries from 23 games, his highest ever try tally.

=== 2019 ===
Cooper played all 24 games for the Cowboys in 2019, starting at second row in 23 of those games, scoring three tries. In Round 17, he played his 300th NRL game in the Cowboys' 15–12 win over the Sydney Roosters at Central Coast Stadium.

On 30 August, Cooper signed a one-year contract extension with the Cowboys.

=== 2020 ===
Cooper began the season as a starting second-row for the Cowboys, scoring a try in their Round 1 loss to the Brisbane Broncos. He started just two more games before being relegated to a bench role for the rest of the season.

On 14 September, the Cowboys announced that Cooper would leave the club at the end of the 2020 NRL season, after 11 seasons with the team. In Round 20, Cooper played his final game for the Cowboys, kicking a goal in the side's 32–16 win over the Brisbane Broncos.

== Post playing ==
After retiring from the NRL, Cooper would take up a behind the scenes role at the Cowboys becoming the clubs community engagement officer.

== Achievements and accolades ==
=== Individual ===
- North Queensland Cowboys Club Person of the Year: 2011

=== Team ===
- 2014 NRL Auckland Nines: North Queensland Cowboys – Winners
- 2015 NRL Grand Final: North Queensland Cowboys – Winners
- 2016 World Club Challenge: North Queensland Cowboys – Winners

== Statistics ==
=== NRL ===
Statistics are correct to the end of the 2020 season

| † | Denotes seasons in which Cooper won an NRL Premiership |

| Season | Team | Matches | T | G | GK % | F/G | Pts |
|---|---|---|---|---|---|---|---|
| 2006 | North Queensland | 18 | 3 | 0 | — | 0 | 12 |
| 2007 | Gold Coast | 22 | 2 | 0 | — | 0 | 8 |
| 2008 | Gold Coast | 14 | 1 | 0 | — | 0 | 4 |
| 2009 | Penrith | 22 | 1 | 1 | 50.0 | 0 | 6 |
| 2010 | Penrith | 18 | 3 | 0 | — | 0 | 12 |
| 2011 | North Queensland | 24 | 6 | 1 | 25.0 | 0 | 26 |
| 2012 | North Queensland | 26 | 10 | 0 | — | 0 | 40 |
| 2013 | North Queensland | 22 | 7 | 0 | — | 0 | 28 |
| 2014 | North Queensland | 17 | 6 | 0 | — | 0 | 24 |
| 2015† | North Queensland | 27 | 11 | 0 | — | 0 | 44 |
| 2016 | North Queensland | 26 | 9 | 0 | — | 0 | 36 |
| 2017 | North Queensland | 25 | 3 | 0 | — | 0 | 12 |
| 2018 | North Queensland | 23 | 13 | 0 | — | 0 | 52 |
| 2019 | North Queensland | 24 | 3 | 0 | — | 0 | 12 |
| 2020 | North Queensland | 15 | 1 | 1 | 100.0 | 0 | 6 |
| Career totals | | 323 | 79 | 3 | 42.9 | 0 | 322 |

=== State of Origin ===
| † | Denotes seasons in which Cooper won a State of Origin Series |

| Season | Team | Matches | T | G | GK % | F/G | Pts |
|---|---|---|---|---|---|---|---|
| 2016† | Queensland | 1 | 1 | 0 | — | 0 | 4 |
| 2017† | Queensland | 2 | 0 | 0 | — | 0 | 0 |
| 2018 | Queensland | 3 | 0 | 0 | — | 0 | 0 |
| Career totals | | 6 | 1 | 0 | — | 0 | 4 |

== Personal life ==
Cooper and his wife, Tenille Cooper (née Stephenson), have two sons.

Cooper is the younger brother of former Cronulla Sharks, Melbourne Storm and Newcastle Knights player Dustin Cooper, who played 37 NRL games between 2003 and 2008.
