= 2016 North Queensland Cowboys season =

Coordinates: 27°27′53″S 153°0′34″E

- NRL Rank: 4th
- 2016 record: Wins: 15; draws: 0; losses: 9
- Points scored: For: 584; against: 355

Team information
- CEO: Greg Tonner
- Coach: Paul Green
- Captain: Johnathan Thurston Matthew Scott
- Stadium: 1300SMILES Stadium
- Avg. attendance: 16,692
- High attendance: 25,163 (vs. Brisbane Broncos, Round 11)

Top scorers
- Tries: Kyle Feldt (15)
- Goals: Johnathan Thurston (98)
- Points: Johnathan Thurston (201)
| ← 2015 | 2017 → |

The 2016 North Queensland Cowboys season was the 22nd in the club's history and their first as defending premiers. THe team is based in Townsville, Queensland, Australia. Coached by Paul Green and co-captained by Johnathan Thurston and Matthew Scott, they competed in the NRL's 2016 Telstra Premiership. In the pre-season the Cowboys competed in the 2016 Auckland Nines tournament, reaching the quarter-finals. The team finished the regular season in 4th, losing in the preliminary final to the eventual premiers, the Cronulla Sharks.

== Season summary ==
=== Milestones ===
- Round 1: Johnathan Thurston scored his 1,800th point in the NRL.
- Round 3: Lachlan Coote scored his 50th try in the NRL.
- Round 5: Javid Bowen made his NRL debut.
- Round 5: James Tamou played his 150th game for the club.
- Round 5: Javid Bowen scored his first NRL try.
- Round 7: Justin O'Neill played his 100th NRL game.
- Round 7: Johnathan Thurston scored his 1,000th point at 1300SMILES Stadium.
- Round 9: Kane Linnett scored his 50th NRL try.
- Round 10: Ethan Lowe played his 50th game for the club.
- Round 11: Johnathan Thurston played his 250th game for the club.
- Round 12: Jahrome Hughes made his debut for the club.
- Round 12: Jahrome Hughes scored his first NRL try.
- Round 13: Ray Thompson played his 100th game for the club.
- Round 13: Gavin Cooper scored his 50th try for the club.
- Round 14: Jason Taumalolo played his 100th game for the club.
- Round 17: Gavin Cooper played his 150th game for the club.
- Round 18: Josh Chudleigh made his NRL debut.
- Round 18: Josh Chudleigh scored his first NRL try.
- Round 26: Lachlan Coote and Jake Granville played their 50th games for the club.
- Finals Week 1: Ben Hannant played his 50th game for the club.
- Finals Week 2: Justin O'Neill played his 50th game for the club.
- Finals Week 2: Kalyn Ponga made his NRL debut.
- Finals Week 2: Michael Morgan played his 100th game for the club.
- Finals Week 3: John Asiata played his 50th game for the club.

== Squad List ==
North Queensland Cowboys NRL Squad 2016
| First team squad | | | Coaching staff |
|---|---|---|---|
| John Asiata – LK, SR; Scott Bolton – PR, LK; Javid Bowen – CE, WG; Josh Chudleigh – HK; Gavin Cooper – SR; Lachlan Coote – FB; Kyle Feldt – WG; Jake Granville – HK; Ben Hannant – PR; Coen Hess – SR; Sam Hoare – PR | Shaun Hudson – CE, FB; Jahrome Hughes – FB, FE; Patrick Kaufusi – PR; Rory Kostjasyn – HK, LK; Kyle Laybutt – FE; Kane Linnett – CE; Ethan Lowe – SR; Patrick Mago – SR; Tautau Moga – CE, WG; Michael Morgan – FE, FB; Justin O'Neill – CE, WG | Kalyn Ponga – FB; Matthew Scott (c) – PR; Ben Spina – PR, LK; James Tamou – PR; Jason Taumalolo – LK; Ray Thompson – HK, HB; Johnathan Thurston (c) – PR; Braden Uele – PR; Antonio Winterstein – WG, CE | Head coach: Paul Green; Assistant coaches: David Furner; Todd Payten; Legend: (c) Captain(s); (vc) Vice-captain(s); Updated: 10 October 2015; Source(s): Cowboys Squad 2016 |

== Squad Movement ==
=== Gains ===
| Player | Signed from | Until end of | Notes |
|---|---|---|---|
| Shaun Hudson | Gold Coast Titans | 2017 | |
| Jahrome Hughes | Townsville Blackhawks | 2016 | |
| Patrick Mago | Canberra Raiders | 2016 | |

=== Losses ===
| Player | Signed To | Until end of | Notes |
|---|---|---|---|
| Glenn Hall | Townsville Blackhawks | 2016 | |
| Viliame Kikau | Penrith Panthers | 2017 | |
| Cameron King | Parramatta Eels | 2016 | |
| Robert Lui | Salford Red Devils | 2016 | |
| Hezron Murgha | Townsville Blackhawks | 2016 | |
| Zac Santo | Canberra Raiders | 2016 | |
| Scott Schulte | Parramatta Eels | 2016 | |
| Kelepi Tanginoa | Parramatta Eels | 2016 | |
| Matthew Wright | Manly Sea Eagles (mid-season) | 2018 | |

=== Re-signings ===
| Player | Club | Until end of | Notes |
|---|---|---|---|
| Javid Bowen | North Queensland Cowboys | 2018 | |
| Josh Chudleigh | North Queensland Cowboys | 2018 | |
| Lachlan Coote | North Queensland Cowboys | 2018 | |
| Jake Granville | North Queensland Cowboys | 2018 | |
| Sam Hoare | North Queensland Cowboys | 2018 | |
| Patrick Kaufusi | North Queensland Cowboys | 2017 | |
| Kane Linnett | North Queensland Cowboys | 2018 | |
| Ethan Lowe | North Queensland Cowboys | 2018 | |
| Justin O'Neill | North Queensland Cowboys | 2018 | |
| Antonio Winterstein | North Queensland Cowboys | 2018 | |

== Ladder ==
2016 NRL season
| Pos | Team | Pld | W | D | L | B | PF | PA | PD | Pts |
|---|---|---|---|---|---|---|---|---|---|---|
| 1 | Melbourne Storm | 24 | 19 | 0 | 5 | 2 | 563 | 302 | +261 | 42 |
| 2 | Canberra Raiders | 24 | 17 | 1 | 6 | 2 | 688 | 456 | +232 | 39 |
| 3 | Cronulla-Sutherland Sharks (P) | 24 | 17 | 1 | 6 | 2 | 580 | 404 | +176 | 39 |
| 4 | North Queensland Cowboys | 24 | 15 | 0 | 9 | 2 | 584 | 355 | +229 | 34 |
| 5 | Brisbane Broncos | 24 | 15 | 0 | 9 | 2 | 554 | 434 | +120 | 34 |
| 6 | Penrith Panthers | 24 | 14 | 0 | 10 | 2 | 563 | 463 | +100 | 32 |
| 7 | Canterbury-Bankstown Bulldogs | 24 | 14 | 0 | 10 | 2 | 506 | 448 | +58 | 32 |
| 8 | Gold Coast Titans | 24 | 11 | 1 | 12 | 2 | 508 | 497 | +11 | 27 |
| 9 | Wests Tigers | 24 | 11 | 0 | 13 | 2 | 499 | 607 | −108 | 26 |
| 10 | New Zealand Warriors | 24 | 10 | 0 | 14 | 2 | 513 | 601 | −88 | 24 |
| 11 | St. George Illawarra Dragons | 24 | 10 | 0 | 14 | 2 | 341 | 538 | −197 | 24 |
| 12 | South Sydney Rabbitohs | 24 | 9 | 0 | 15 | 2 | 473 | 549 | −76 | 22 |
| 13 | Manly-Warringah Sea Eagles | 24 | 8 | 0 | 16 | 2 | 454 | 563 | −109 | 20 |
| 14 | Parramatta Eels | 24 | 13 | 0 | 11 | 2 | 298 | 324 | −26 | 18^{1} |
| 15 | Sydney Roosters | 24 | 6 | 0 | 18 | 2 | 443 | 576 | −133 | 16 |
| 16 | Newcastle Knights | 24 | 1 | 1 | 22 | 2 | 305 | 800 | −495 | 7 |

^{1} Parramatta were deducted 12 competition points and their for/against tally accumulated between rounds 1-9 for gross long-term salary cap breaches.

== Fixtures ==
=== NRL Auckland Nines ===
The NRL Auckland Nines is a pre-season rugby league nines competition featuring all 16 NRL clubs. The Cowboys, whose side featured a returning Matthew Bowen, finished first in their pool before being eliminated by the Melbourne Storm in the quarter-finals.

==== Pool Play ====
Rangitoto Pool
| Team | Pld | W | D | L | PF | PA | PD | Pts |
|---|---|---|---|---|---|---|---|---|
| North Queensland Cowboys | 3 | 2 | 0 | 1 | 55 | 36 | +19 | 4 |
| Newcastle Knights | 3 | 2 | 0 | 1 | 48 | 58 | −10 | 4 |
| Penrith Panthers | 3 | 1 | 0 | 2 | 48 | 37 | +11 | 2 |
| Wests Tigers | 3 | 1 | 0 | 2 | 36 | 56 | −20 | 2 |

| Date | Time (Local) | Round | Opponent | Venue | Score | Tries | Goals |
|---|---|---|---|---|---|---|---|
| Saturday, 6 February | 1:20pm | Round 1 | Newcastle Knights | Eden Park | 28 – 12 | Cooper (3), Gela-Mosby (2), O'Neill | M. Bowen (1), Morgan (1) |
| Saturday, 6 February | 5:40pm | Round 2 | Wests Tigers | Eden Park | 12 – 13 | Gela-Mosby (2), Winterstein | - |
| Sunday, 7 February | 11:50am | Round 3 | Penrith Panthers | Eden Park | 15 – 11 | Cooper, Hess, Lowe | Coote (1) |
| Sunday, 7 February | 2:30pm | Quarter-final | Melbourne Storm | Eden Park | 6 – 14 | Kostjasyn | Coote (1) |
Legend: Win Loss

=== Pre-season ===
| Date | Round | Opponent | Venue | Score | Tries | Goals | Attendance |
|---|---|---|---|---|---|---|---|
| Saturday, 6 February | Trial 1 | Brisbane Broncos | Salter Oval | 26 – 48 | Chudleigh, Creith, Hughes, Mago, Ponga | Laybutt (3/5) | 8,122 |
| Thursday, 11 February | Trial 2 | Townsville Blackhawks | Jack Manski Oval | 18 – 16 | Cooper, Morgan, O'Neill | Thurston (3/3) | - |
| Sunday, 21 February | Trial 3 | Leeds Rhinos | Headingley Stadium | 38 – 4 | O'Neill (2), Coote, Feldt, Linnett, Morgan, Thurston | Thurston (5/7) | 19,778 |
Legend: Win Loss Draw

=== Regular season ===
| Date | Round | Opponent | Venue | Score | Tries | Goals | Attendance |
|---|---|---|---|---|---|---|---|
| Saturday, 5 March | Round 1 | Cronulla Sharks | 1300SMILES Stadium | 20 – 14 | Linnett, Lowe, O'Neill | Thurston (4/4) | 15,519 |
| Saturday, 12 March | Round 2 | Parramatta Eels | Pirtek Stadium | 16 – 20 | Lowe, O'Neill, Taumalolo | Thurston (2/3) | 12,194 |
| Thursday, 17 March | Round 3 | Sydney Roosters | 1300SMILES Stadium | 40 – 0 | Bolton, Coote, Feldt, Linnett, Morgan, Taumalolo, Winterstein | Thurston (6/7) | 8,099 |
| Friday, 25 March | Round 4 | Brisbane Broncos | Suncorp Stadium | 20 – 21 | Granville, Morgan, Lowe | Thurston (4/4) | 46,176 |
| Saturday, 2 April | Round 5 | St George Illawarra Dragons | 1300SMILES Stadium | 36 – 0 | Feldt (2), Bolton, Bowen, Cooper, O'Neill | Thurston (6/6) | 17,444 |
| Saturday, 9 April | Round 6 | Penrith Panthers | Pepper Stadium | 23 – 18 | Bowen, Cooper, Feldt, O'Neill | Thurston (3/4), Coote (1 FG) | 13,725 |
| Friday, 15 April | Round 7 | South Sydney Rabbitohs | 1300SMILES Stadium | 44 – 18 | O'Neill (2), Cooper, Feldt, Lowe, Morgan, Thurston, Winterstein | Thurston (6/8) | 15,487 |
| Saturday, 23 April | Round 8 | Parramatta Eels | 1300SMILES Stadium | 32 – 16 | Morgan (2), Cooper, Coote, Winterstein | Thurston (6/7) | 19,308 |
| Saturday, 30 April | Round 9 | Manly Sea Eagles | Brookvale Oval | 34 – 18 | Feldt (2), Cooper, Linnett, Morgan, Winterstein | Thurston (5/6) | 11,734 |
| Saturday, 14 May | Round 10 | Melbourne Storm | Suncorp Stadium | 14 – 15 | Cooper, Morgan | Thurston (3/3) | 52,347 |
| Friday, 20 May | Round 11 | Brisbane Broncos | 1300SMILES Stadium | 19 – 18 | Coote, O'Neill, Scott | Thurston (3/3, 1 FG) | 25,163 |
| Saturday, 28 May | Round 12 | St George Illawarra Dragons | WIN Stadium | 10 – 14 | Feldt, Hughes | Lowe (1/2) | 10,032 |
| Saturday, 4 June | Round 13 | Newcastle Knights | 1300SMILES Stadium | 46 – 16 | Feldt (2), Ray Thompson (2), Cooper, Granville, Kostjasyn, Winterstein | Thurston (7/8) | 14,651 |
| Monday, 13 June | Round 14 | Cronulla Sharks | Southern Cross Group Stadium | 10 – 13 | Winterstein | Thurston (3/3) | 13,119 |
| | Round 15 | Bye | | | | | |
| Monday, 27 June | Round 16 | Manly Sea Eagles | 1300SMILES Stadium | 30 – 26 | Taumalolo (2), Coote, Tamou, Winterstein | Thurston (5/5) | 15,584 |
| Sunday, 3 July | Round 17 | South Sydney Rabbitohs | Barlow Park | 20 – 0 | Bowen, Scott, Thurston | Thurston (4/5) | 14,923 |
| Monday, 11 July | Round 18 | Canberra Raiders | GIO Stadium | 12 – 26 | Chudleigh, Hess | Lowe (2/2) | 8,328 |
| | Round 19 | Bye | | | | | |
| Thursday, 21 July | Round 20 | Canterbury Bulldogs | 1300SMILES Stadium | 36 – 0 | Winterstein (3), O'Neill (2), Bowen, Lowe | Lowe (2/3), Thurston (2/4) | 11,260 |
| Saturday, 30 July | Round 21 | Melbourne Storm | 1300SMILES Stadium | 8 – 16 | Winterstein | Lowe (2/2) | 20,256 |
| Sunday, 7 August | Round 22 | Wests Tigers | Leichhardt Oval | 14 – 26 | Linnett, Lowe | Thurston (3/3) | 14,246 |
| Sunday, 14 August | Round 23 | Sydney Roosters | Allianz Stadium | 10 – 22 | Linnett, Lowe | Thurston (1/2) | 8,760 |
| Saturday, 20 August | Round 24 | New Zealand Warriors | 1300SMILES Stadium | 34 – 6 | Feldt (2), Morgan, O'Neill, Taumalolo, Ray Thompson | Thurston (5/6) | 15,676 |
| Thursday, 25 August | Round 25 | Canterbury Bulldogs | Belmore Sports Ground | 24 – 16 | Lowe (2), Hess, Taumalolo | Thurston (4/5) | 10,144 |
| Saturday, 3 September | Round 26 | Gold Coast Titans | 1300SMILES Stadium | 32 – 16 | Cooper (2), O'Neill, Tamou, Winterstein | Thurston (6/6) | 21,495 |
Legend: Win Loss Draw Bye

=== Finals ===
Qualifying and elimination finals
10 Sept, Melbourne Rectangular Stadium
1 | Melbourne | 16
4 | North Queensland | 10
9 Sept, Lang Park
5 | Brisbane | 44
8 | Gold Coast | 28
11 Sept, Sydney Football Stadium
6 | Penrith | 28
7 | Canterbury | 12
10 Sept, Canberra Stadium
2 | Canberra | 14
3 | Cronulla | 16

Semi-finals
16 Sept, Willows Sports Complex
North Queensland | 26
Brisbane | 20
17 Sept, Canberra Stadium
Canberra | 22
Penrith | 12

Preliminary finals
24 Sept, Melbourne Rectangular Stadium
Melbourne | 14
Canberra | 12
23 Sept, Sydney Football Stadium
Cronulla | 32
North Queensland | 20

Grand final
2 Oct, Stadium Australia
Melbourne | 12
Cronulla | 14

| Date | Round | Opponent | Venue | Score | Tries | Goals | Attendance |
|---|---|---|---|---|---|---|---|
| Saturday, 10 September | Qualifying Final | Melbourne Storm | AAMI Park | 16 – 10 | Feldt, Winterstein | Thurston (1/2) | 21,233 |
| Friday, 16 September | Semi-final | Brisbane Broncos | 1300SMILES Stadium | 26 – 20 | O'Neill (2), Hess, Morgan | Thurston (5/6) | 23,804 |
| Friday, 23 September | Preliminary Final | Cronulla Sharks | Allianz Stadium | 32 –20 | Feldt (2), Coote, Hess | Thurston (2/4) | 36,717 |
Legend: Win Loss Draw

== Statistics ==
| Name | App | T | G | FG | Pts |
|---|---|---|---|---|---|
| John Asiata | 19 | - | - | - | - |
| Scott Bolton | 27 | 2 | - | - | 8 |
| Javid Bowen | 10 | 4 | - | - | 16 |
| Josh Chudleigh | 1 | 1 | - | - | 4 |
| Gavin Cooper | 26 | 9 | - | - | 36 |
| Lachlan Coote | 27 | 5 | - | 1 | 21 |
| Kyle Feldt | 24 | 15 | - | - | 60 |
| Jake Granville | 25 | 2 | - | - | 8 |
| Ben Hannant | 24 | - | - | - | - |
| Coen Hess | 8 | 4 | - | - | 16 |
| Jahrome Hughes | 1 | 1 | - | - | 4 |
| Patrick Kaufusi | 12 | - | - | - | - |
| Rory Kostjasyn | 26 | 1 | - | - | 4 |
| Kane Linnett | 22 | 5 | - | - | 20 |
| Ethan Lowe | 25 | 9 | 7 | - | 50 |
| Tautau Moga | 1 | - | - | - | - |
| Michael Morgan | 22 | 9 | - | - | 36 |
| Justin O'Neill | 25 | 13 | - | - | 52 |
| Kalyn Ponga | 2 | - | - | - | - |
| Matthew Scott | 23 | 2 | - | - | 8 |
| Ben Spina | 2 | - | - | - | - |
| James Tamou | 25 | 2 | - | - | 8 |
| Jason Taumalolo | 27 | 6 | - | - | 24 |
| Ray Thompson | 7 | 3 | - | - | 12 |
| Johnathan Thurston | 24 | 2 | 96 | 1 | 201 |
| Antonio Winterstein | 24 | 13 | - | - | 52 |
| Totals | | 108 | 103 | 2 | 640 |

== Representatives ==
The following players have played a representative match in 2016.

| | All Stars match | ANZAC Test | Polynesian Cup | City vs Country | Residents match | State of Origin 1 | State Of Origin 2 | State of Origin 3 | Four Nations |
|---|---|---|---|---|---|---|---|---|---|
| John Asiata | - | - | Samoa | - | - | - | - | - | - |
| Gavin Cooper | - | - | - | - | - | - | - | Queensland | - |
| Jahrome Hughes | - | - | - | - | Queensland | - | - | - | - |
| Patrick Kaufusi | - | - | Tonga | - | - | - | - | - | - |
| Rory Kostjasyn | - | - | - | Country | - | - | - | - | - |
| Kane Linnett | - | - | - | Country | - | - | - | - | - |
| Michael Morgan | - | Australia | - | - | - | Queensland | Queensland | - | Australia |
| Justin O'Neill | - | - | - | - | - | Queensland | Queensland | Queensland | Australia |
| Matthew Scott | - | Australia | - | - | - | Queensland | Queensland | Queensland | Australia |
| James Tamou | - | Australia | - | - | - | New South Wales | New South Wales | New South Wales | - |
| Jason Taumalolo | - | New Zealand | - | - | - | - | - | - | New Zealand |
| Johnathan Thurston | - | Australia | - | - | - | Queensland | Queensland | Queensland | Australia |
| Antonio Winterstein | - | - | Samoa | - | - | - | - | - | - |
| Matthew Wright | World All Stars | - | - | - | - | - | - | - | - |

== Honours ==
=== League ===
- Dally M Medal: Jason Taumalolo
- Dally M Lock of the Year: Jason Taumalolo
- Rugby League Players Association Player of the Year: Jason Taumalolo
- NYC Team of the Year: Gideon Gela-Mosby, Kalyn Ponga, Brandon Smith

=== Club ===
- Paul Bowman Medal: Jason Taumalolo
- Players' Player: Jason Taumalolo
- Member's Player of the Year: Jason Taumalolo
- Club Person of the Year: John Asiata
- Most Improved: Ethan Lowe
- Rookie of the Year: Javid Bowen
- NYC Player of the Year: Brandon Smith
- Townsville Bulletins' Fan Choice Award: Michael Morgan

== Feeder Clubs ==
=== National Youth Competition ===
- North Queensland Cowboys - 2nd, lost preliminary final

=== Queensland Cup ===
- Mackay Cutters - 14th, missed finals
- Northern Pride - 8th, missed finals
- Townsville Blackhawks - 3rd, lost semi final
