= 2016 World Club Series =

2016 Dacia World Club Series
- League: World Club Series
- Duration: 3 games
- Teams: 6
- Highest attendance: 19,778 Leeds Rhinos vs North Queensland Cowboys
- Lowest attendance: 14,008 St. Helens vs Sydney Roosters
- Broadcast partners: (United Kingdom) Sky Sports (United Kingdom) BBC Sport (United Kingdom) SLTV (Australia) Nine Network (France) beIN Sport (United States) Fox Soccer Plus (Europe) Sport Klub

2016 Series
- World Champions: North Queensland Cowboys
- Series Winners: (Australia) NRL
- Runners-up: Leeds Rhinos
- Biggest away win: Wigan Warriors 12–42 Brisbane Broncos
- Top point-scorer: Johnathan Thurston (14)
- Top try-scorer(s): Justin O'Neill; Dominique Peyroux; Aidan Guerra; Corey Oates; Kodi Nikorima (2)

The 2016 World Club Series (also known as the 2016 Dacia World Club Series due to sponsorship by Dacia) was the second edition of the World Club Series and saw three Super League teams and three National Rugby League (NRL) teams participate. The series included the World Club Challenge, a one-off match between the champions of the Super League and NRL.

== Background ==
Qualification for the Super League teams was changed to include the Challenge Cup winners, as well as the League Leaders and Grand Final winner. As the Leeds Rhinos claimed all three possible qualification positions, the Super League Board decided to invite Super League semi-finalist St Helens to take part in the series.

The three National Rugby League teams were announced as the champion North Queensland Cowboys, the Brisbane Broncos, who were defeated in the grand final, and the minor premier Sydney Roosters.

== Series details ==
Winners	Score	Runners-up
(Australia) NRL	3 - 0	(England) Super League

=== Game 1: Fourth vs Minor Premiers ===
The match celebrated the 40th anniversary of the inaugural World Club Challenge, which involved both teams.

19 February 2016

St. Helens	12 – 38	Sydney Roosters
Tries: Dominique Peyroux (42', 62') 2 Goals: Luke Walsh 2/2 (43', 64')	1st: 0 - 22; 12 - 16	Tries: 2 (21', 54') Aiden Guerra; 1 (15') Kane Evans; 1 (26') Blake Ferguson; 1 (37') Dale Copley; 1 (52') Shaun Kenny-Dowall; 1 (67') Daniel Tupou; Goals: 5/7 Jackson Hastings (23', 27', 38', 53', 55')

Langtree Park, St. Helens
Attendance: 14,008
Referee: (England) Ben Thaler
Player of the Match: Kane Evans

=== Game 2: Grand Final runners-up ===
Game 2 was a repeat of last year's fixture, where Brisbane Broncos won 14-12 in golden point extra time.

20 February 2016

Wigan Warriors	12 – 42	Brisbane Broncos
Tries: Dan Sarginson (21') 1 George Williams (76') 1 Goals: Matty Smith 1/1 (22'); Sam Powell 1/1 (77')	1st: 6 - 24; 2nd: 6 - 18	Tries: 2 (10', 53') Corey Oates; 2 (17', 57') Kodi Nikorima; 1 (32') Matt Gillett; 1 (39') Jarrod Wallace; 1 (67') Greg Eden; Goals: 6/6 Corey Parker (11', 18', 33', 54', 58', 68'; 1/1 Jordan Kahu (40')

DW Stadium, Wigan
Attendance: 19,103
Referee: (Australia) Matt Cecchin
Player of the Match: Anthony Milford

=== World Club Challenge ===
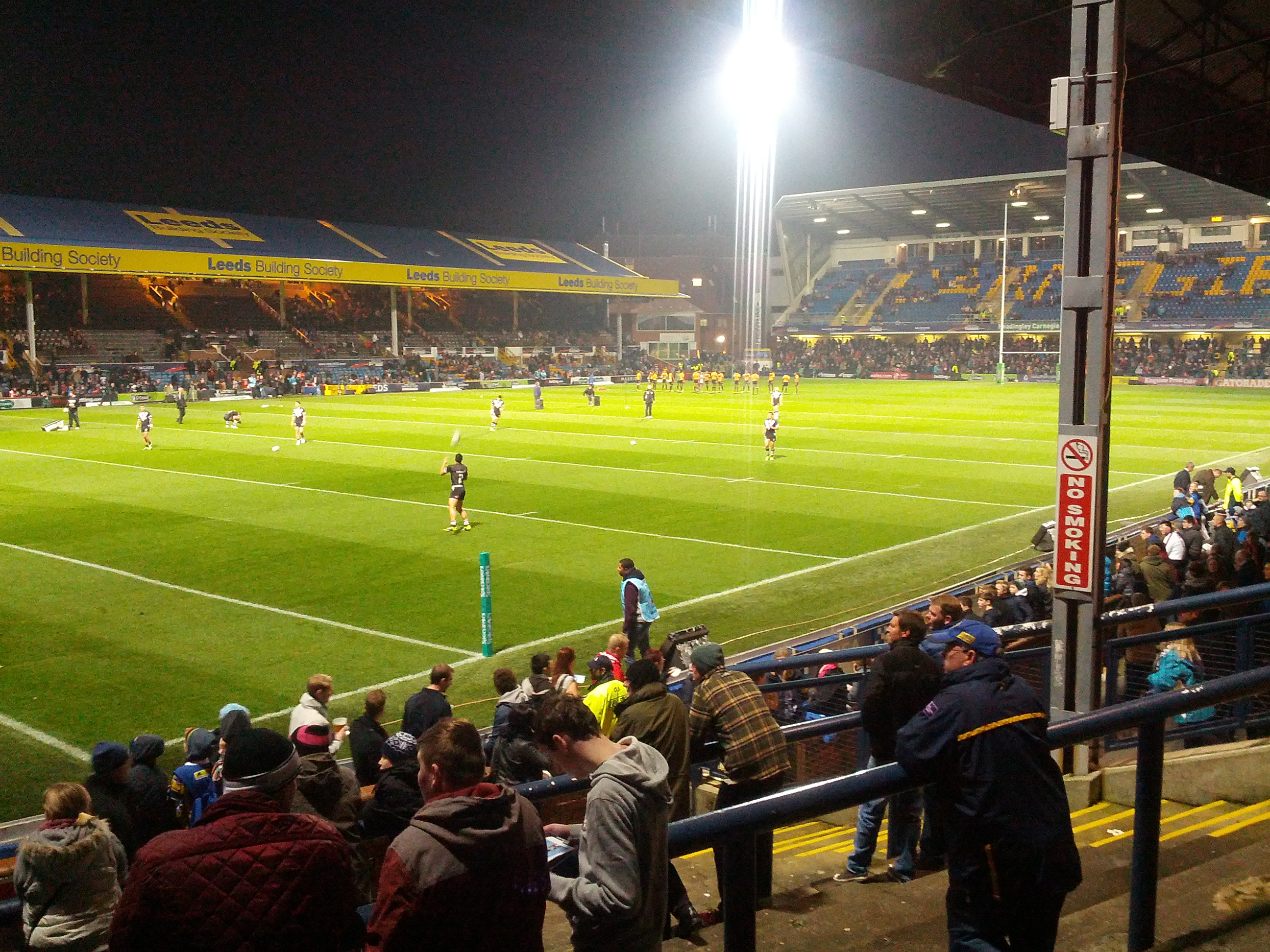
Headingley hosted the match.

This was the first time the two clubs had met since the 1997 World Club Championship tournament.

21 February 2016

Leeds Rhinos	4 – 38	North Queensland Cowboys
Tries: Rob Burrow (32') 1 Mitch Garbutt (red card) 72'	1st: 4 - 4; 2nd: 0 - 34	Tries: 2 (69', 76') Justin O'Neill; 1 (22') Michael Morgan; 1 (42') Kane Linnett; 1 (49') Kyle Feldt; 1 (62') Lachlan Coote; 1 (64') Johnathan Thurston; James Tamou (yellow card) 72'; Goals: 5/7 Johnathan Thurston (43', 63', 66', 70', 78')

Headingley, Leeds
Attendance: 19,778
Referee: (England) Richard Silverwood
Graham Murray Medal: Johnathan Thurston

==== Leeds Rhinos ====
Leeds won the Treble in 2015 in their most successful season. They beat Wigan Warriors 22-20 in the Grand Final to qualify for their 7th World Club Challenge.

==== North Queensland Cowboys ====
The Cowboys won their first premiership in 2015, which was their 20th anniversary. They beat the Brisbane Broncos in extra time of a dramatic grand final to qualify for their first World Club Challenge.

==== Teams ====
2016 World Club Challenge teams
Leeds Rhinos	Position	North Queensland Cowboys
Zak Hardaker	Fullback	Lachlan Coote
Ash Handley	Winger	Kyle Feldt
Kallum Watkins	Centre	Justin O'Neill
Joel Moon	Centre	Kane Linnett
Ryan Hall	Winger	Antonio Winterstein
Liam Sutcliffe	Five-eighth	Michael Morgan
Jordan Lilley	Halfback	Johnathan Thurston (c)
Adam Cuthbertson	Prop	Matthew Scott (c)
Rob Burrow (c)	Hooker	Jake Granville
Keith Galloway	Prop	James Tamou
Brett Ferres	Second row	Gavin Cooper
Brett Delaney	Second row	Ethan Lowe
Brad Singleton	Lock	Jason Taumalolo
Mitch Garbutt	Interchange	Rory Kostjasyn
Jimmy Keinhorst	Interchange	John Asiata
Anthony Mullally	Interchange	Scott Bolton
Josh Walters	Interchange	Ben Hannant
Brian McDermott	Coach	Paul Green
