= John Asiata =

Samoa & Tonga international rugby league footballer

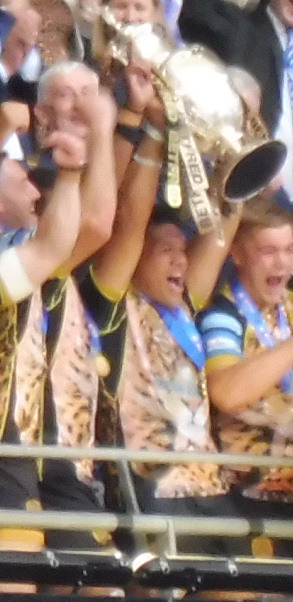

Personal information
- Full name: Atalani Selesele-Asiata
- Born: 19 April 1993 (age 33) Penrith, New South Wales, Australia
- Height: 6 ft 0 in (1.83 m)
- Weight: 16 st 7 lb (105 kg)

Playing information
- Position: Loose forward, Prop, Stand-off
Club
| Years | Team | Pld | T | G | FG | P |
|---|---|---|---|---|---|---|
| 2014–20 | North Qld Cowboys | 128 | 4 | 0 | 0 | 16 |
| 2021 | Brisbane Broncos | 10 | 1 | 0 | 0 | 4 |
| 2022–24 | Leigh Leopards | 76 | 10 | 0 | 0 | 36 |
| 2025– | Hull FC | 23 | 1 | 0 | 0 | 4 |
| | Total | 237 | 16 | 0 | 0 | 60 |
Representative
| Years | Team | Pld | T | G | FG | P |
| 2016–24 | Samoa | 3 | 0 | 0 | 0 | 0 |
| 2019 | Tonga | 2 | 0 | 0 | 0 | 0 |
- Source: As of 22 November 2026

Atalani "John" Asiata (born 19 April 1993) is a professional rugby league footballer, who plays as a loose forward, prop and stand-off for Hull FC in the Super League.

He has also played for both Samoa and Tonga at international level.

He previously played for the Brisbane Broncos, and the North Queensland Cowboys in the NRL, forming part of the Cowboys' 2015 NRL Grand Final and 2016 World Club Challenge winning sides.

== Background ==
Asiata was born in Penrith, New South Wales, Australia to a Samoan father and a Tongan mother.

He played his junior football for the Minchinbury Jets before moving to Wentworthville Magpies whilst attending Patrician Brothers' College, Blacktown.

== Playing career ==
In 2009, Asiata was a member of the Parramatta Eels side that finished runners-up in the Harold Matthews Cup. In 2010, he played with the Western Sydney Academy in the S.G. Ball Cup before being signed by the Sydney Roosters. He played for the Roosters' S.G. Ball team in 2011 and played for their National Youth Competition (NYC) team in 2012 and 2013. At the end of 2013, Asiata was named at lock in the 2013 NYC team of the year. In November 2013 Asiata signed a two-year contract with the North Queensland Cowboys, starting in 2014, following his Sydney Roosters NYC coach, Paul Green, to the North Queensland outfit.

=== 2014 ===
Asiata started the year playing for the North Queensland Queensland Cup affiliate, the Mackay Cutters. He would play 18 games for them in 2014, scoring five tries.

In round 12 of the 2014 NRL season, Asiata made his debut for the North Queensland club, against the Melbourne Storm, off interchange bench in their 22–0 win at 1300SMILES Stadium. Asiata finished his debut year in the NRL with 6 matches for the Cowboys. On 14 October 2014, Asiata was named the Cowboys' rookie of the year at their annual presentation ball.

=== 2015 ===
On 31 January and 1 February, Asiata played for North Queensland's in the 2015 NRL Auckland Nines. On 27 April, he was named in Samoa's 18-man squad to face Tonga in the 2015 Polynesian Cup. He was the side's 18th man and did not participate in the match. In round 9, he made his first start in the NRL, in North Queensland's 23–16 victory over the Canterbury-Bankstown Bulldogs. On 21 May, he re-signed with North Queensland on a two-year contract until the end of the 2017 NRL season. On 4 October, in the 2015 NRL Grand Final against the Brisbane Broncos, Asiata played off the interchange bench in the clubs golden-point 17–16 win. He finished off his premiership winning 2015 season having played in 25 matches.

=== 2016 ===
On 2 February, Asiata was named in North Queensland's 2016 NRL Auckland Nines squad. On 21 February, he was a member of the Cowboys' 2016 World Club Challenge winning side, coming off the bench in the side's 38–4 victory over Leeds at Headingley Stadium. On 7 May, he made his international debut for Samoa against Tonga in the 2016 Polynesian Cup. Asiata played 19 games in 2016, which included his third career start, against the Canberra Raiders in Round 18.

=== 2017 ===
In Round 7 of the 2017 NRL season, Asiata started at halfback against the St. George Illawarra Dragons, replacing the injured Johnathan Thurston. In the 26–20 loss, Asiata finished the game with two try-assists and two line-break assists. On 16 May, he re-signed with the North Queensland club until the end of the 2020 NRL season.

In North Queensland's semi-final win over the Parramatta Eels, his 76th NRL game, Asiata scored his first ever NRL try. On 1 October, he played off the interchange bench in North Queensland's 2017 NRL Grand Final loss to the Melbourne Storm. Asiata finished the 2017 season playing in all 28 games for the club.

=== 2018 ===
After playing in the first seven games of the 2018 NRL season, Asiata suffered a pectoral tear in North Queensland's 26–14 win over the Gold Coast Titans, which saw him miss 11 weeks. He returned for the side's Round 18 game against Canberra and played the last eight games of the season. Due to the injury, he finished the season with just 15 games played (starting four of them), his lowest total since his rookie season.

=== 2019 ===
Asiata played in all 24 games for North Queensland in 2019, scoring three tries, his highest single-season try tally. Due to injuries, he spent considerable time in the halves once again, starting 11 games at five-eighth and one at halfback. In Round 7, he played his 100th NRL game in the sides 12–24 loss to the Canterbury-Bankstown Bulldogs. On 22 June, he made his debut for Tonga, starting at five-eighth in their 14–34 loss to New Zealand.

=== 2020 ===
Asiata played in the first four games of the season for North Queensland before suffering a knee injury in a 16–26 loss to the Cronulla-Sutherland Sharks, ruling him out for eight weeks. He returned in the clubs Round 12 loss to the Canberra Raiders. In Round 18, Asiata was charged with dangerous contact and was suspended for one game.

On 24 September, North Queensland announced that Asiata would leave the club at the end of the season. In Round 20, he played his final game for North Queensland, a 32–16 win over the Brisbane Broncos. On 3 October, he won the Cowboys' Club Person of the Year award for the second time. In November 2020, Asiata signed a one-year deal with the Brisbane Broncos.

=== 2021 ===
On 16 September, Asiata signed a one-year deal with the Canterbury-Bankstown Bulldogs commencing in 2022. However the contract was terminated on 7 December for his continual refusal to receive a COVID-19 vaccination.

On 15 December it was announced that Asiata had signed for English Betfred Championship side Leigh Centurions.

=== 2022 ===
In round 1 of the 2022 Championship season, Asiata made his club debut for Leigh in their 50–4 victory over Whitehaven R.L.F.C. On 28 May 2022, Asiata played for Leigh in their 2022 RFL 1895 Cup final victory over Featherstone. On 3 October 2022, Asiata played for Leigh in their Million Pound Game victory over Batley which saw the club promoted back to the Super League.

=== 2023 ===
Following Leigh's 12-10 Challenge Cup semi-final victory over St Helens, Asiata was cited but not suspended for alleged cannonball tackles. It was reported that four players suffered injuries following tackles from Asiata with Alex Walmsley and Agnatius Paasi being ruled out for the season. St Helens head coach Paul Wellens accused the RFL of not protecting players following the game. On 12 August, Asiata captained Leigh Leopards in their Challenge Cup final victory over Hull Kingston Rovers. Asiata played 24 games for Leigh in the 2023 Super League season as the club finished fifth on the table and qualified for the playoffs.

=== 2024 ===
In round 3 of the 2024 Super League season, Leigh played against St Helens for the first time since the Challenge Cup semi-final with Asiata performing a cannonball tackle within the first minute of the match similar to the tackles he performed last year in the corresponding fixture. Asiata was given a yellow card and ban over the incident, however the ban received was later rescinded as it was deemed Asiata's action were not illegal. Asiata later returned to the match but suffered a torn calf muscle as Leigh lost the game 12-4. On 2 October 2024 it was reported that he had signed for Hull F.C. on a three-year deal.

=== 2025 ===
Asiata played 14 games for Hull F.C. in the 2025 Super League season as the club finished 7th on the table.

== Achievements and accolades ==
=== Individual ===
- North Queensland Cowboys Club Person of the Year: 2016, 2020
- North Queensland Cowboys Rookie of the Year: 2014
- NYC Team of the Year: 2013

=== Team ===
- 2015 NRL Grand Final: North Queensland Cowboys – Winners
- 2016 World Club Challenge: North Queensland Cowboys – Winners
- 2023 Challenge Cup: Leigh Leopards - Winners

== Statistics ==
=== NRL ===
Statistics are correct to the end of 2024

| † | Denotes seasons in which Asiata won an NRL Premiership |

| Season | Team | Matches | T | G | GK % | F/G | Pts |
|---|---|---|---|---|---|---|---|
| 2014 | North Queensland Cowboys | 6 | 0 | 0 | — | 0 | 0 |
| 2015† | North Queensland Cowboys | 25 | 0 | 0 | — | 0 | 0 |
| 2016 | North Queensland Cowboys | 19 | 0 | 0 | — | 0 | 0 |
| 2017 | North Queensland Cowboys | 28 | 1 | 0 | — | 0 | 4 |
| 2018 | North Queensland Cowboys | 15 | 0 | 0 | — | 0 | 0 |
| 2019 | North Queensland Cowboys | 24 | 3 | 0 | — | 0 | 12 |
| 2020 | North Queensland Cowboys | 11 | 0 | 0 | — | 0 | 0 |
| 2021 | Brisbane Broncos | 10 | 1 | | | | 4 |
| 2022 | Leigh Leopards | 31 | 7 | | | | 28 |
| 2023 | Leigh Leopards | 26 | 1 | | | | 4 |
| 2024 | Leigh Leopards | 8 | | | | | |
| 2025 | Hull FC | 17 | 1 | 0 | 0 | 0 | 4 |
| Career totals | | 230 | 15 | 0 | — | 0 | 60 |

=== International ===
| Season | Team | Matches | T | G | GK % | F/G | Pts |
|---|---|---|---|---|---|---|---|
| 2016 | Samoa | 1 | 0 | 0 | — | 0 | 0 |
| 2017 | Samoa | 1 | 0 | 0 | — | 0 | 0 |
| 2019 | Tonga | 1 | 0 | 0 | — | 0 | 0 |
| Career totals | | 3 | 0 | 0 | — | 0 | 0 |

== Personal life ==
Asiata and his wife, Shailah, have three children: a daughter, Eleana, and two sons, JJ and Izzy
