= 2018 North Queensland Cowboys season =

Coordinates: 27°27′53″S 153°0′34″E

- NRL Rank: 13th
- Play-off result: Missed finals
- 2018 record: Wins: 8; draws: 0; losses: 16
- Points scored: For: 449; against: 521

Team information
- CEO: Greg Tonner
- Coach: Paul Green
- Captain: Johnathan Thurston Matthew Scott
- Stadium: 1300SMILES Stadium
- Avg. attendance: 15,417
- High attendance: 25,095 (vs. Parramatta Eels, Round 24)

Top scorers
- Tries: Kyle Feldt (14)
- Goals: Johnathan Thurston (77)
- Points: Johnathan Thurston (166)
← 2017	2019 →

The 2018 North Queensland Cowboys season was the 24th in the club's history. This rugby league team is based in Townsville, Queensland, Australia. Coached by Paul Green and co-captained by Johnathan Thurston and Matthew Scott, they competed in the NRL's 2018 Telstra Premiership. The team finished the regular season in 13th position and did not qualify for the finals.

== Season summary ==
=== Milestones ===
- Round 1: Johnathan Thurston played his 300th NRL game.
- Round 1: Johnathan Thurston played his 271st game for the club, becoming the Cowboys' most capped player.
- Round 1: Jordan McLean made his debut for the club.
- Round 2: Antonio Winterstein played his 200th NRL game.
- Round 2: Jordan McLean scored his first try for the club.
- Round 7: Ethan Lowe played his 100th NRL game for the club.
- Round 11: Jason Taumalolo played his 150th NRL game for the club.
- Round 11: Francis Molo made his debut for the club.
- Round 13: Mitchell Dunn made his NRL debut.
- Round 13: Jake Granville played his 100th NRL game.
- Round 13: Enari Tuala scored his first NRL try.
- Round 16: Gavin Cooper played his 200th NRL game for the club.
- Round 19: Jake Clifford made his NRL debut.
- Round 20: The club won their 250th game.
- Round 24: Jake Granville played his 100th NRL game for the club.
- Round 24: Matthew Scott played his 250th game for the club.
- Round 25: Gavin Cooper scored in his 9th consecutive game, breaking the record set by Frank Burge in 1918 for most consecutive try scoring games by a forward.

=== Squad ===
North Queensland Cowboys NRL Squad 2018
First team squad			Coaching staff
Carlin Anderson – FB, WG; John Asiata – PR, LK; Scott Bolton – PR; Javid Bowen – CE, WG; Josh Chudleigh – HK; Jake Clifford – HB; Gavin Cooper – SR; Lachlan Coote – FB; Mitchell Dunn – SR, FE; Kyle Feldt – WG; Shaun Fensom – LK, PR; Gideon Gela-Mosby – WG	Jake Granville – HK; Ben Hampton – CE, FB; Coen Hess – SR; Sam Hoare – PR; Shaun Hudson – CE; Corey Jensen – PR; Kyle Laybutt – HB, FE; Kane Linnett – CE; Ethan Lowe – SR; Te Maire Martin – FE; Jordan McLean – PR; Francis Molo – PR	Michael Morgan – FE, HB; Justin O'Neill – CE; Emry Pere – PR; Matthew Scott (c) – PR; Jason Taumalolo – LK; Murray Taulagi – WG; Johnathan Thurston (c) – HB; Enari Tuala – CE; Antonio Winterstein – WG; Shane Wright – SR	Head coach: Paul Green; Assistant coaches: David Fairleigh (assistant coach); Todd Payten (assistant coach); Josh Hannay (assistant coach); Paul Bowman (high performance manager); Mark Henry (assistant strength & conditioning coach); Ashley Graham (elite pathways performance coach); Anthony Wood (rehabilitation manager); Steve Sartori (physiotherapist); Legend: (c) Captain(s); (vc) Vice-captain(s); Updated: 9 June 2018; Source(s): Cowboys Squad 2018

== Squad movement ==
=== Gains ===
Player	Signed From	Until End of	Notes
Carlin Anderson	Townsville Blackhawks	2019	
Jordan McLean	Melbourne Storm	2020	
Francis Molo	Townsville Blackhawks	2018	

=== Losses ===
Player	Signed To	Until End of	Notes
Corey Horsburgh	Canberra Raiders	2019	
Marcus Jensen	Townsville Brothers	2018	
Patrick Kaufusi	Melbourne Storm	2019	
Blake Leary	Burleigh Bears	2018	
Patrick Mago	Brisbane Broncos	2018	
Kalyn Ponga	Newcastle Knights	2022	
Ben Spina	Herbert River Crushers	2018	
Ray Thompson	Retired	-	
Braden Uele	Cronulla Sharks	2019	

=== Re-signings ===
Player	Club	Until End of	Notes
Jake Clifford	North Queensland Cowboys	2021	
Jake Granville	North Queensland Cowboys	2020	
Coen Hess	North Queensland Cowboys	2022	
Francis Molo	North Queensland Cowboys	2020	
Michael Morgan	North Queensland Cowboys	2023	
Justin O'Neill	North Queensland Cowboys	2021	
Emry Pere	North Queensland Cowboys	2020	
Shane Wright	North Queensland Cowboys	2020	

== Ladder ==
Pos	Team	Pld	W	D	L	B	PF	PA	PD	Pts	
1	Sydney Roosters (M, P)	24	16	0	8	1	542	361	+181	34	Advance to finals series
2	Melbourne Storm	24	16	0	8	1	536	363	+173	34	Advance to finals series
3	South Sydney Rabbitohs	24	16	0	8	1	582	437	+145	34	Advance to finals series
4	Cronulla-Sutherland Sharks	24	16	0	8	1	519	423	+96	34	Advance to finals series
5	Penrith Panthers	24	15	0	9	1	517	461	+56	32	Advance to finals series
6	Brisbane Broncos	24	15	0	9	1	556	500	+56	32	Advance to finals series
7	St. George Illawarra Dragons	24	15	0	9	1	519	472	+47	32	Advance to finals series
8	New Zealand Warriors	24	15	0	9	1	472	447	+25	32	Advance to finals series
9	Wests Tigers	24	12	0	12	1	377	460	−83	26	
10	Canberra Raiders	24	10	0	14	1	563	540	+23	22	
11	Newcastle Knights	24	9	0	15	1	414	607	−193	20	
12	Canterbury-Bankstown Bulldogs	24	8	0	16	1	428	474	−46	18	
13	North Queensland Cowboys	24	8	0	16	1	449	521	−72	18	
14	Gold Coast Titans	24	8	0	16	1	472	582	−110	18	
15	Manly-Warringah Sea Eagles	24	7	0	17	1	500	622	−122	16	
16	Parramatta Eels (W)	24	6	0	18	1	374	550	−176	14	

Updated to match(es) played on 2 September 2018. Source: 2018 NRL Ladder
(M) Minor premiers; (P) Premiers; (W) Wooden spoon

== Fixtures ==
=== Pre-season ===
Date	Round	Opponent	Venue	Score	Tries	Goals	Attendance
Saturday, 17 February	Trial 1	Wests Tigers	Barlow Park	30 – 16	Asiata, Clifford, Hess	Clifford (2/2), Lowe (0/1)	-
Friday, 23 February	Trial 2	Melbourne Storm	Suncorp Stadium	16 – 14	Feldt (3), Thurston	Lowe (0/2), Cooper (0/1), Feldt (0/1)	25,000
Legend: Win Loss Draw

=== Regular season ===
Date	Round	Opponent	Venue	Score	Tries	Goals	Attendance
Friday, 9 March	Round 1	Cronulla Sharks	1300SMILES Stadium	20 – 14	Cooper, Feldt, Hess, O'Neill	Thurston (2/5)	15,900
Friday, 16 March	Round 2	Brisbane Broncos	Suncorp Stadium	20 – 24	Cooper, Granville, McLean	Thurston (4/4)	46,080
Thursday, 22 March	Round 3	Melbourne Storm	AAMI Park	14 – 30	Hess (2)	Thurston (3/3)	12,866
Thursday, 29 March	Round 4	Penrith Panthers	1300SMILES Stadium	14 – 33	Feldt (2), Winterstein	Thurston (1/3)	11,907
Saturday, 7 April	Round 5	Warriors	Mt Smart Stadium	12 – 22	Feldt, Hampton	Thurston (2/2)	25,600
Saturday, 14 April	Round 6	Canterbury Bulldogs	1300SMILES Stadium	10 – 27	Feldt, Hampton	Thurston (1/2)	14,434
Saturday, 21 April	Round 7	Gold Coast Titans	1300SMILES Stadium	26 – 14	Feldt, Hampton, Hess, Taumalolo	Thurston (5/7)	12,885
Saturday, 28 April	Round 8	Canberra Raiders	1300SMILES Stadium	8 – 18	Cooper	Thurston (2/2)	14,004
Friday, 4 May	Round 9	Penrith Panthers	Carrington Park	26 – 20	Cooper, Hampton, Morgan, Thurston	Thurston (5/6)	10,289
Thursday, 10 May	Round 10	Wests Tigers	Leichhardt Oval	12 – 20	Martin, Winterstein	Thurston 2/2)	13,127
Saturday, 19 May	Round 11	South Sydney Rabbitohs	1300SMILES Stadium	19 – 20	Winterstein (2)	Thurston (5/5); Morgan (1 FG)	14,270
Friday, 25 May	Round 12	Melbourne Storm	1300SMILES Stadium	6 – 7	Feldt	Thurston (1/1)	16,003
Thursday, 31 May	Round 13	Manly Sea Eagles	Lottoland	26 – 12	Winterstein (2), Taumalolo, Tuala	Thurston (5/6)	6,172
Saturday, 9 June	Round 14	Parramatta Eels	TIO Stadium	20 – 14	Feldt, Scott, Tuala	Thurston (1/3)	8,393
Friday, 15 June	Round 15	Warriors	1300SMILES Stadium	16 – 23	Feldt (2), Bowen	Thurston (2/4)	11,062
Sunday, 1 July	Round 16	South Sydney Rabbitohs	Barlow Park	21 – 20	Cooper, Coote, Winterstein	Thurston (4/4)	7,651
	Round 17	Bye					
Saturday, 14 July	Round 18	Canberra Raiders	GIO Stadium	12 – 38	Coote, Cooper	Thurston (2/2)	11,471
Saturday, 21 July	Round 19	St George Illawarra Dragons	1300SMILES Stadium	10 – 24	Cooper	Thurston (3/4)	18,068
Friday, 27 July	Round 20	Newcastle Knights	1300SMILES Stadium	20 – 18	Cooper, Hess, O'Neill, Thurston	Thurston (2/4)	11,709
Saturday, 4 August	Round 21	Sydney Roosters	Allianz Stadium	20 – 26	Cooper, Taumalolo, Thurston	Thurston (4/5)	9,721
Thursday, 9 August	Round 22	Brisbane Broncos	1300SMILES Stadium	34 – 30	Cooper, Feldt, Gela-Mosby, Hess, Taumalolo	Thurston (7/8), Feldt (1/1)	19,663
Saturday, 18 August	Round 23	Cronulla Sharks	Southern Cross Group Stadium	16 – 28	Cooper, Hess, McLean	Thurston (2/4)	12,270
Friday, 24 August	Round 24	Parramatta Eels	1300SMILES Stadium	44 – 6	Feldt (3), Hampton (2), Cooper Gela-Mosby	Thurston (6/6)	25,095
Saturday, 1 September	Round 25	Gold Coast Titans	Cbus Super Stadium	30 –26	Hampton (2), Cooper, Fensom, Gela-Mosby	Thurston (5/5)	26,681
Legend: Win Loss Draw Bye

== Statistics ==
Name	App	T	G	FG	Pts
John Asiata	15	-	-	-	-
Scott Bolton	22	-	-	-	-
Javid Bowen	6	1	-	-	4
Jake Clifford	6	-	-	-	-
Gavin Cooper	23	13	-	-	52
Lachlan Coote	9	2	-	-	8
Mitchell Dunn	2	-	-	-	-
Kyle Feldt	24	14	1	-	58
Shaun Fensom	14	1	-	-	4
Gideon Gela-Mosby	4	3	-	-	12
Jake Granville	24	1	-	-	4
Ben Hampton	22	8	-	-	32
Coen Hess	23	7	-	-	28
Sam Hoare	3	-	-	-	-
Corey Jensen	18	-	-	-	-
Kane Linnett	12	-	-	-	-
Ethan Lowe	15	-	-	-	-
Te Maire Martin	23	1	-	-	4
Jordan McLean	10	2	-	-	8
Francis Molo	7	-	-	-	-
Michael Morgan	11	1	-	1	5
Justin O'Neill	21	2	-	-	8
Matthew Scott	18	1	-	-	4
Jason Taumalolo	23	4	-	-	16
Johnathan Thurston	24	3	77	-	166
Enari Tuala	10	2	-	-	8
Antonio Winterstein	16	7	-	-	28
Shane Wright	2	-	-	-	-
Totals		73	78	1	449

== Representatives ==
The following players have played a representative match in 2018.

	Pacific Test	Denver Test	State of Origin 1	State of Origin 2	State of Origin 3	Prime Minister's XIII	October Tests
Jake Clifford	–	–	–	–	–	Prime Minister's XIII	–
Gavin Cooper	–	–	Queensland	Queensland	Queensland	–	–
Coen Hess	–	–	Queensland	Queensland	Queensland	–	–
Kyle Laybutt	–	–	–	–	–	Papua New Guinea	–
Te Maire Martin	–	New Zealand	–	–	–	–	–
Jordan McLean	–	–	–	–	–	Prime Minister's XIII	Australia
Michael Morgan	–	–	Queensland	–	–	–	–
Jason Taumalolo	Tonga	–	–	–	–	–	Tonga
Enari Tuala	–	–	–	–	–	Prime Minister's XIII	–

== Honours ==
=== League ===
- Dally M Lock of the Year: Jason Taumalolo
- Rugby League Players Association Halfback of the Year: Johnathan Thurston
- Rugby League Players Association Lock of the Year: Jason Taumalolo

=== Club ===
- Paul Bowman Medal: Jason Taumalolo
- Players' Player: Jason Taumalolo
- Coach's Award: Kyle Feldt
- Member's Player of the Year: Kyle Feldt
- Club Person of the Year: Johnathan Thurston
- Rookie of the Year: Jake Clifford
- Townsville Bulletins' Fan Choice Award: Johnathan Thurston

== Feeder Clubs ==
=== Queensland Cup ===
- Mackay Cutters - 14th, missed finals
- Northern Pride - 4th, lost elimination final
- Townsville Blackhawks - 3rd, lost elimination final
