= Antonio Winterstein =

Samoa international rugby league footballer

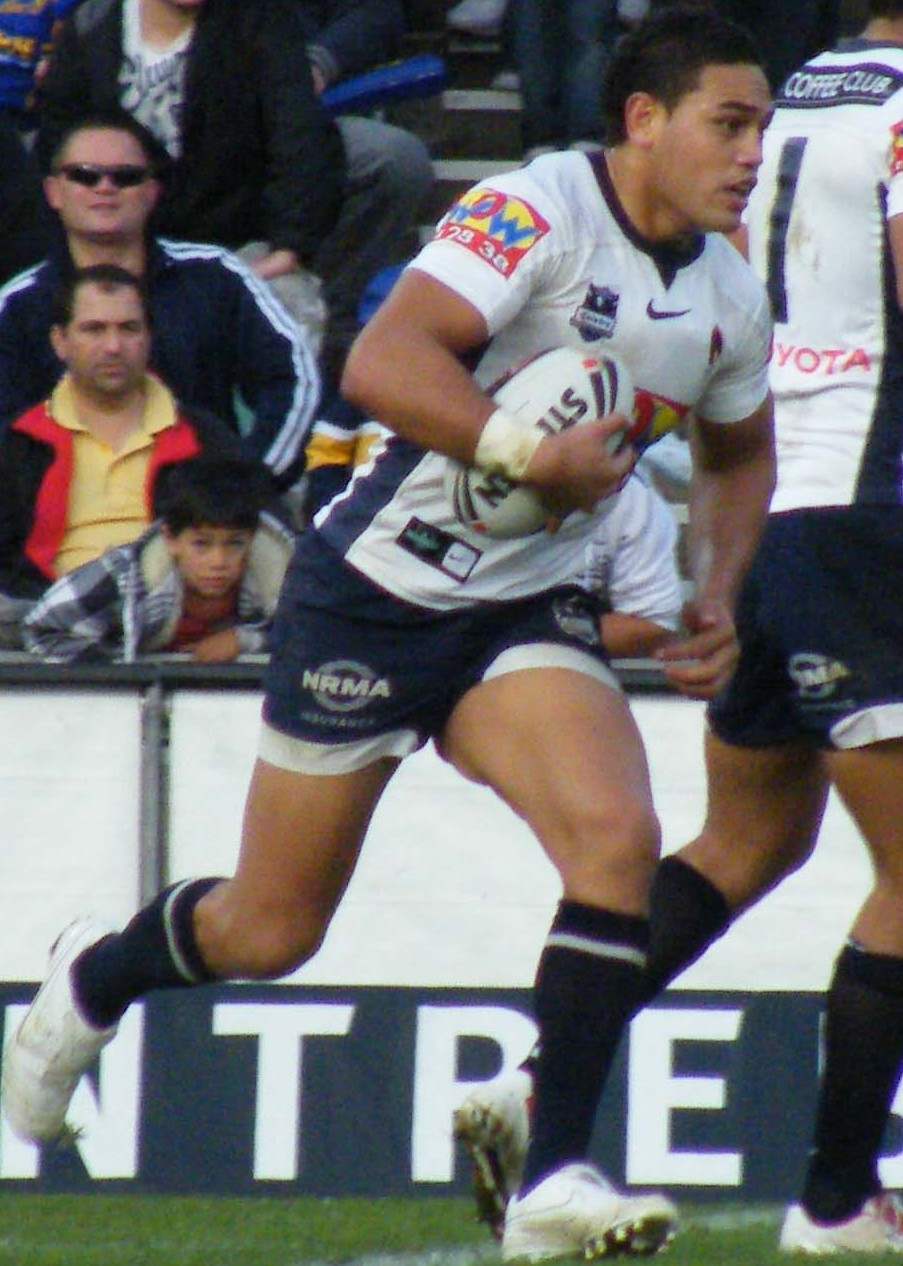

Personal information
- Born: 30 May 1988 (age 38) Auckland, New Zealand

Playing information
- Height: 188 cm (6 ft 2 in)
- Weight: 95 kg (14 st 13 lb)
- Position: Wing, Centre
Club
Years	Team	Pld	T	G	FG	P
2009–10	Brisbane Broncos	47	19	0	0	76
2011–18	North Qld Cowboys	167	78	0	0	312
	Total	214	97	0	0	388
Representative
Years	Team	Pld	T	G	FG	P
2013–17	Samoa	8	7	1	0	30
2015	NRL All Stars	1	0	0	0	0
- Education: Marsden State High School
- Alma mater: Sunnybank High School
- Relatives: Tony Tuimavave (uncle); Paddy Tuimavave (uncle); Paki Tuimavave (uncle); Evarn Tuimavave (cousin); Carlos Tuimavave (cousin); Frank Winterstein (cousin)

Antonio Winterstein (born 30 May 1988) is a former professional rugby league footballer who played for the North Queensland Cowboys and Brisbane Broncos in the NRL. A Samoan international captain, he was a member of the Cowboys' 2015 NRL premiership and 2016 World Club Challenge winning sides.

== Background ==
Born in Auckland, New Zealand he moved to Brisbane in his early years, playing junior rugby league for Logan Brothers, and attended Marsden State High School, where his classmates included future NRL stars Israel Folau and Chris Sandow. Winterstein joined the Sydney Roosters Jersey Flegg side in 2007 and played for their inaugural NYC in 2008.

== Playing career ==
=== 2009 ===
Following the 2008 Toyota Cup (Under-20s) season, Winterstein returned to Brisbane to be closer to family and was invited to train with the Broncos during the off-season. He was selected to play in Round 1 of the 2009 NRL season against his future club the North Queensland Cowboys, and scored a try on début. He scored 16 tries and played almost every game of his first NRL season. He was later named in the New Zealand train-on squad for the 2009 Four Nations series.

=== 2010 ===
Winterstein's streak of 31 consecutive first grade games since his debut was cut in early April 2010 when coach Ivan Henjak dropped him and Ben Te'o for turning up to training late in the lead up to the match against the Dragons, which the Broncos lost. As punishment, Winterstein was relegated to second division for a week, and returned the following week against Cronulla.

At the end of the 2010 NRL season, Winterstein's last with Brisbane, he was part of the New Zealand squad for the 2010 Four Nations but not selected to play in any of the tournament's matches.

=== 2011 ===
Winterstein moved to the North Queensland Cowboys on a 3-year deal with starting from the 2011 NRL season. Winterstein broke his jaw in the Cowboys first trial of the year in February against his former club Brisbane, which resulted in him missing the first month of the NRL. Winterstein returned for the Cowboys in Round 5 against the Gold Coast Titans, playing Centre and starring in the win. After 9 NRL games in 2011, Winterstein tore his pectoral muscle and damaged his shoulder badly in the Round 14 clash against the eventual Premiers Manly. Winterstein was ruled out for the remainder of the season, having played 9 games and scored 4 tries.

=== 2012 ===
In 2012 Winterstein edged out fellow Kiwi international Kalifa Faifai Loa for the Cowboys final wing spot, as the club signed talented Grand Final centre Kane Linnett from the Roosters. Winterstein stayed injury-free in season 2012 and played in all 26 games for the Cowboys; scoring 8 tries. While Wintersteins preferred position is right centre, he was forced to play the majority of the season on the left wing.

Winterstein was awarded for his second season with the Cowboys club with a spot in New Zealand's one-off test squad to play against Australia on 13 October 2012. Winterstein made the New Zealand Four Nations squad in 2010 but missed out on selection in 2011 due to injury.

On 7 December 2012, it was announced that Winterstein had re-signed with the Cowboys on a three-year deal, which will keep the Samoan international at the Townsville-based club until at least the 2016 NRL season.

=== 2013 ===
Antonio made his debut for Samoa in the Pacific Rugby League International against Tonga on 20 April 2013. He was selected for Samoa again later in the year to feature in Samoa's 2013 Rugby League World Cup campaign. Winterstein inspired Samoa to the World Cup quarter-finals scoring 5 tries in 4 games. 3 of those tries came against 'The Kumuls' in the group stage.

=== 2014 ===
On 7 October 2014, Winterstein was selected for the Samoa's 24-man squad for the 2014 Four Nations series.

=== 2015 ===
On 4 October 2015, Winterstein was a member of the Cowboys' Grand Final winning side, starting on the wing in the side's 17–16 victory over the Brisbane Broncos. Winterstein finished the season as the Cowboys' top tryscorer, with a career-high 16 tries.

=== 2016 ===
On 21 February 2016, Winterstein was a member of the Cowboys' World Club Challenge winning side, starting on the wing in the side's 38–4 victory over the Leeds Rhinos at Headingley Stadium. He was originally selected on the wing for the World All Stars in the NRL All Stars game but would later withdraw with teammate Matthew Wright replacing him, albeit on the bench.

On 22 April 2016, Winterstein re-signed with the Cowboys until the end of 2018.

On 7 May 2016, Winterstein played for Samoa in the 2016 Polynesian Cup against Tonga, where he played on the wing and scored a try in the 18–6 win at Parramatta Stadium.

=== 2017 ===
On 3 May 2017, Winterstein was named captain for Samoa in their test against England on 6 May 2017. In the Cowboys' preliminary final win over the Sydney Roosters, Winterstein played his 150th game for the club. On 1 October, he started on the wing in the Cowboys' 2017 NRL Grand Final loss to the Melbourne Storm. He finished the season with just 4 tries from 19 games, his lowest try tally since 2011.

=== 2018 ===
In Round 2 of the 2018 NRL season, Winterstein played his 200th NRL game. On 25 July 2018, after playing 16 games in the 2018 NRL season, Winterstein announced his retirement from rugby league, effective immediately, on advice from the club medical staff due to a persistent knee injury.

== Achievements and accolades ==
=== Team ===
- 2014 NRL Auckland Nines: North Queensland Cowboys – Winners
- 2015 NRL Grand Final: North Queensland Cowboys – Winners
- 2016 World Club Challenge: North Queensland Cowboys – Winners

== Statistics ==
=== NRL ===
Statistics are correct to the end of the 2018 season

†	Denotes seasons in which Winterstein won an NRL Premiership

Season	Team	Matches	T	G	GK %	F/G	Pts
2009	Brisbane	27	14	0	—	0	56
2010	Brisbane	20	5	0	—	0	20
2011	North Queensland	9	2	0	—	0	8
2012	North Queensland	26	8	0	—	0	32
2013	North Queensland	24	13	0	—	0	52
2014	North Queensland	23	15	0	—	0	60
2015†	North Queensland	26	16	0	—	0	64
2016	North Queensland	24	13	0	—	0	52
2017	North Queensland	19	4	0	—	0	16
2018	North Queensland	16	7	0	—	0	28
Career totals		214	97	0	—	0	388

=== International ===
Season	Team	Matches	T	G	GK %	F/G	Pts
2013	Samoa	5	5	1/1	100%	0	22
2014	Samoa	1	1	0	—	0	4
2016	Samoa	1	1	0	—	0	4
2017	Samoa	1	0	0	—	0	0
Career totals		8	7	1/1	100%	0	30

== Personal life ==
Winterstein and his wife Brooke Winterstein (née Peninton) have four daughters, Milanah, Harlan, Novah and Finnlay.

Winterstein comes from a very large rugby league family. His uncles are Paddy and Tony Tuimavave, and he is a cousin of Evarn Tuimavave, current Hull F.C. player Carlos and Manly Sea Eagles forward Frank Winterstein. .
