= Justin O'Neill =

Australia international rugby league footballer

Juz O'Neill
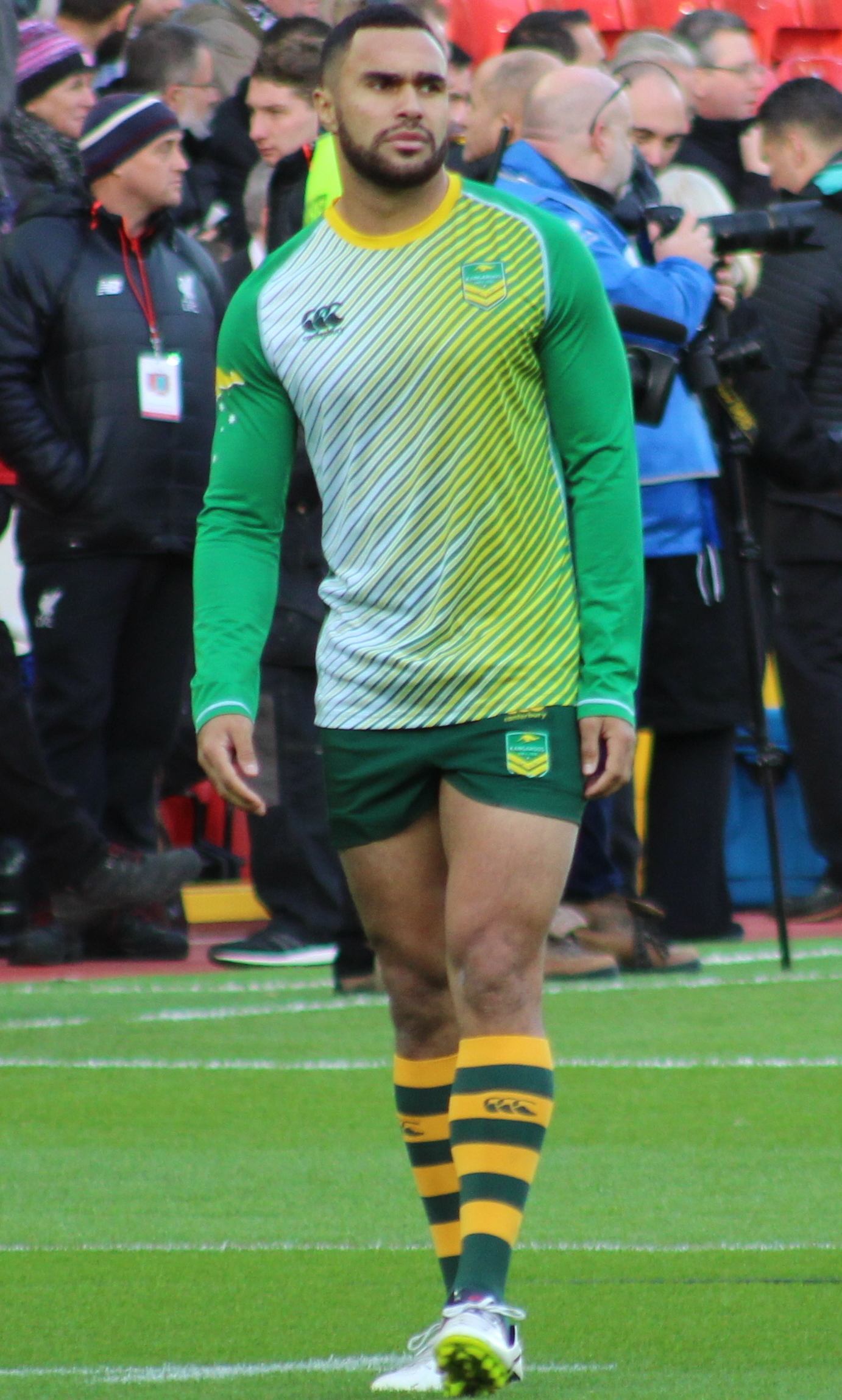

Personal information
- Full name: Justin O'Neill
- Born: 4 April 1991 (age 35) Warwick, Queensland, Australia

Playing information
- Height: 190 cm (6 ft 3 in)
- Weight: 96 kg (15 st 2 lb)
- Position: Centre, Wing
Club
Years	Team	Pld	T	G	FG	P
2010–14	Melbourne Storm	67	34	0	0	136
2015–21	North Qld Cowboys	123	44	0	0	176
	Total	190	78	0	0	312
Representative
Years	Team	Pld	T	G	FG	P
2013	NRL All Stars	1	0	0	0	0
2016–17	Queensland	4	0	0	0	0
2016	Australia	2	0	0	0	0

Justin O'Neill (born 4 April 1991) is an Australian former professional rugby league footballer who played for the Melbourne Storm and North Queensland Cowboys in the NRL and Australia at international level.

He represented the NRL All Stars and Queensland in the State of Origin series and won premierships with the Storm in 2012 and the Cowboys in 2015.

== Background ==
O'Neill was born in Warwick, Queensland, Australia, and is of Ni-Vanuatu descent through his mother. He attended The Cathedral School in Townsville, Queensland,

He played his junior football for the Hughenden Hawks and Townsville Brothers, before being signed by the Melbourne Storm. As a child, O'Neill held the Australian under-15 long jump record with a mark of 7.60m.

== Playing career ==
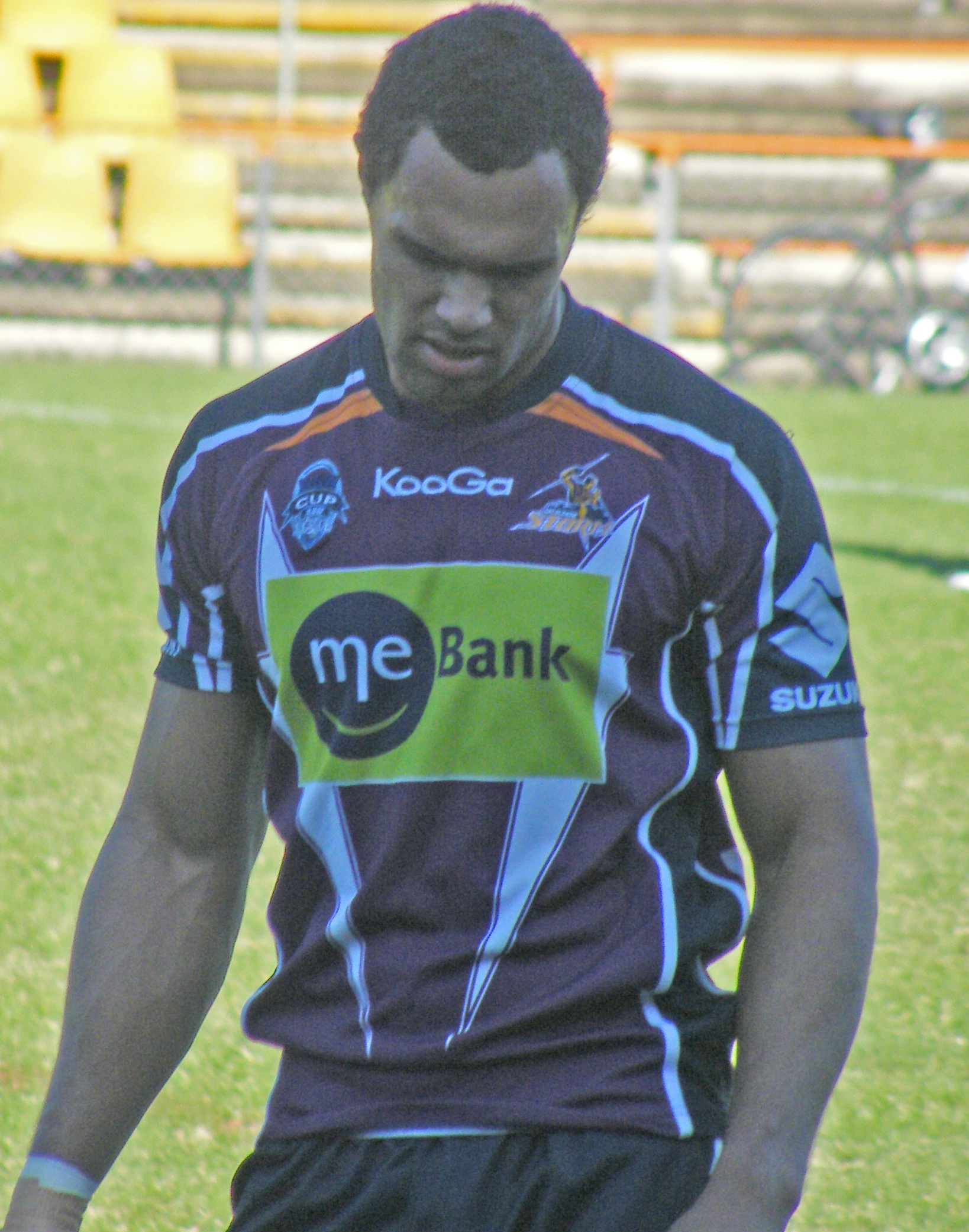
O'Neill playing for the Storm in 2010

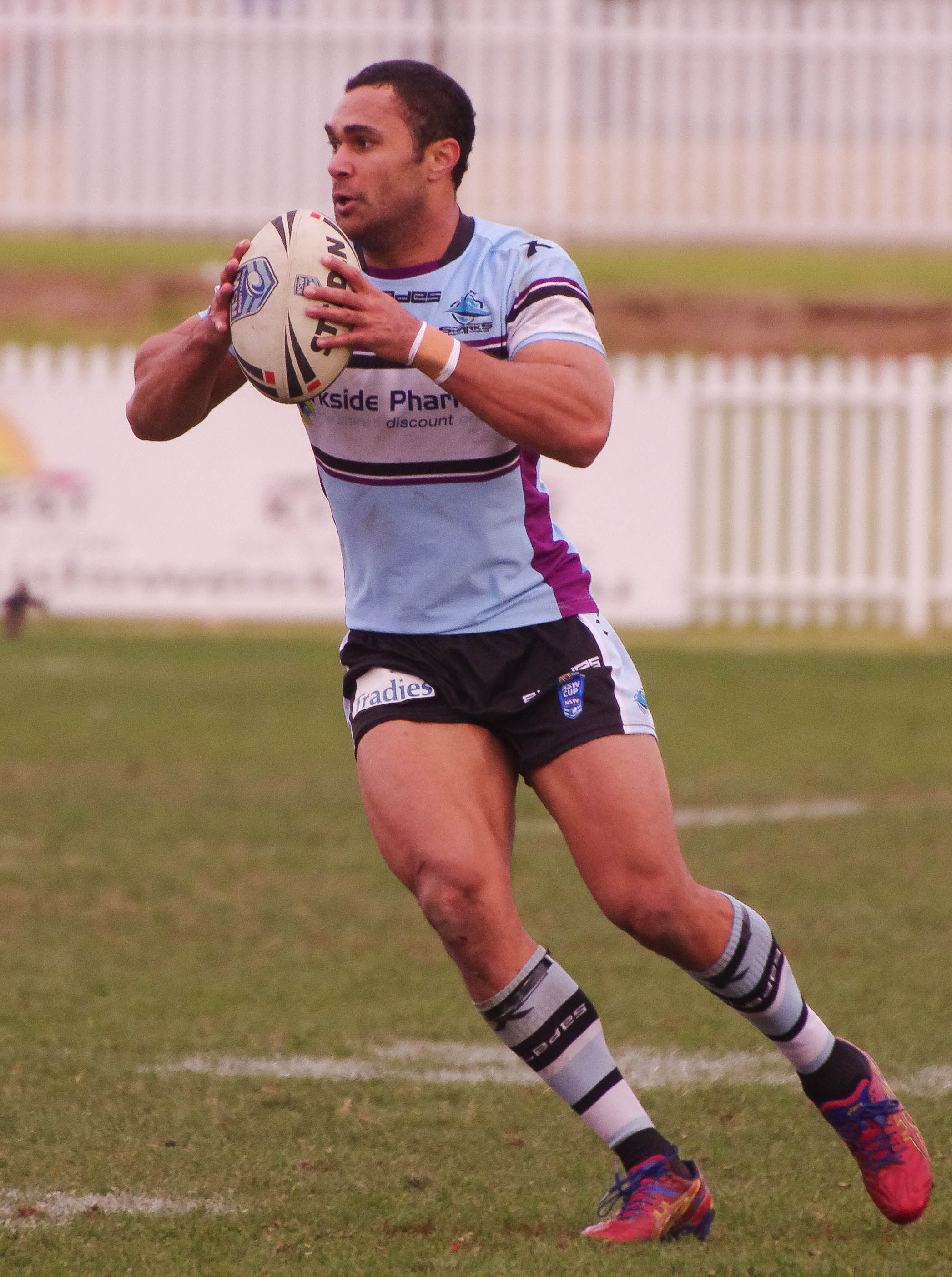
O'Neill playing for the combined Sharks-Storm team in the NSW Cup in 2014

=== Melbourne Storm ===
In September 2007, O'Neill re-signed with the Storm on a 2-year contract. In November 2008, O'Neill played for the Australian Institute of Sport rugby league team that toured France and the United Kingdom. In 2009, he was selected for the Queensland under-18 team. He was a member of the Storm's S. G. Ball Cup team in early 2009, before moving into their NYC team until 2010. On 4 October 2009, O'Neill scored a try in the Storm's 2009 NYC Grand Final win over the Wests Tigers.

O'Neill made his NRL debut for the Storm on 14 June 2010 against the Sydney Roosters. He scored a hat-trick of tries against the North Queensland Cowboys in round 15. In October 2010, O'Neill was selected for the Junior Kangaroos in their two-match series against the Junior Kiwis. He scored a try in both matches.

On 7 May 2012, O'Neill re-signed with the Storm on a 2-year contract. He scored a try in the Storm's 2012 NRL Grand Final win over the Canterbury-Bankstown Bulldogs on 30 September. In September 2012, O'Neill was named in Vanuatu's train-on squad for their match against Greece on 20 October 2012. O'Neill did not play in the match, though some sources indicate that he did. He was a trainer for Vanuatu in their match against the Solomon Islands in October 2013.

In February 2013, O'Neill played for the NRL All Stars in the 2013 All Stars match. On 22 February 2013, he played in the Storm's 2013 World Club Challenge win over the Leeds Rhinos. O'Neill re-signed with the Storm on a 3-year contract on 14 June 2013.

On 20 December 2014, O'Neill signed with the North Queensland Cowboys on a 2-year contract, after being released by the Storm.

=== North Queensland Cowboys ===
O'Neill made his club debut for the Cowboys in round 1 of the 2015 NRL season against the Sydney Roosters, scoring a try. On 4 October 2015, O'Neill was a member of the Cowboys' Grand Final winning side. He scored a try in his side's 17–16 victory over the Brisbane Broncos. At the end of the year he was named the club's most improved player.

On 21 February 2016, he was a member of the Cowboys' 2016 World Club Challenge winning side against the Leeds Rhinos at Headingley Stadium. On 1 July 2016, O'Neill re-signed with the Cowboys for a further 2 years, keeping him at the club until the end of the 2018 season.

O'Neill made his debut for Queensland in the 2016 State of Origin, playing at centre in all 3 of their matches. He had previously been a member of Queensland's Emerging Origin after being first selected in 2012, and was named as a reserve for Queensland in 2013.

On 4 October 2016, O'Neill was selected in Australia's Four Nations squad. He made his debut in Australia's Round 2 against Scotland where his nation was successful in a 40-point victory. O'Neill retained his spot at Centre in the Round 3 victory against New Zealand where he ran for a game high 203 metres. He would go on to have a try disallowed during the 14–8 win for Australia.

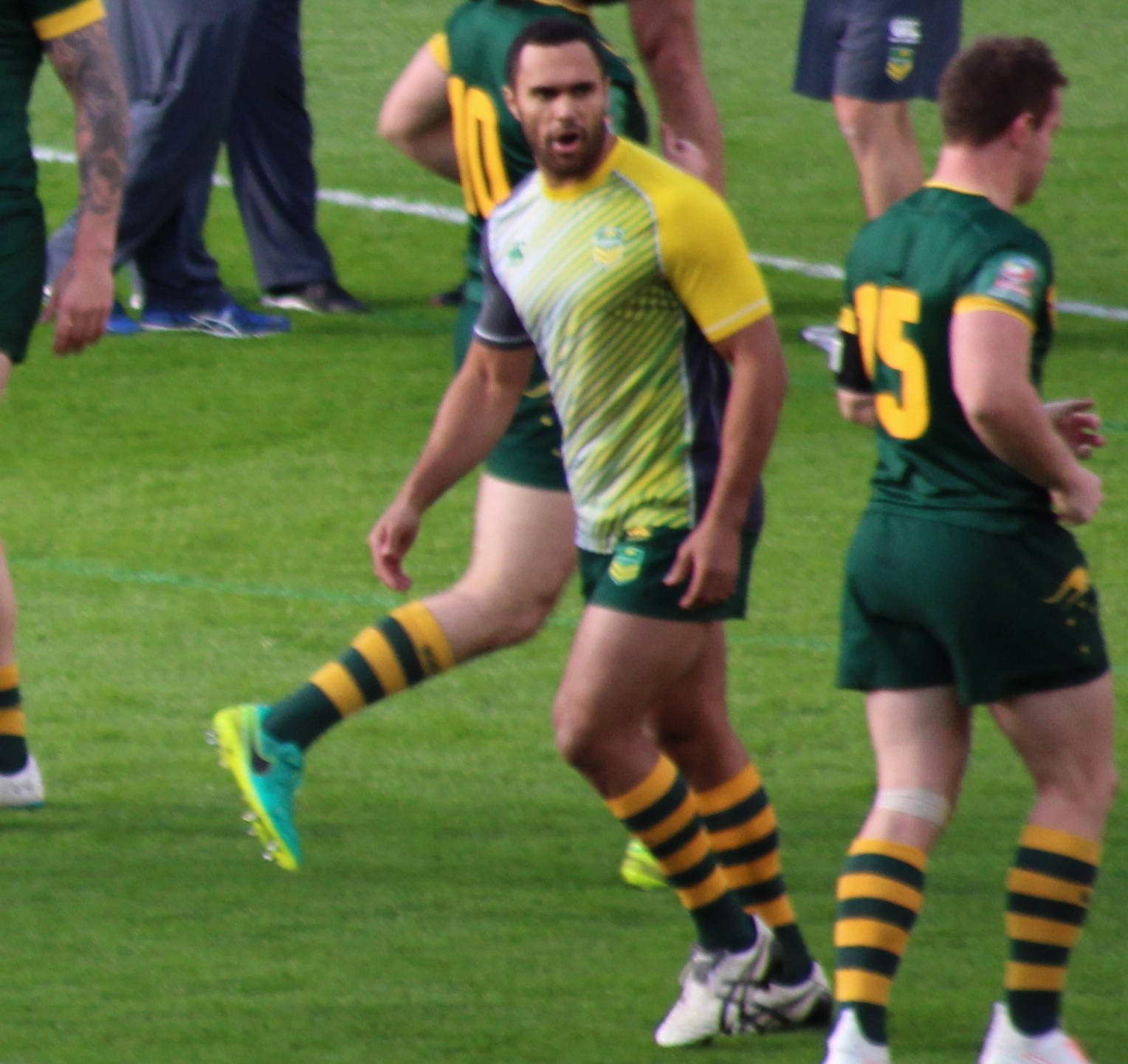
O'Neill warming up for the Kangaroos in London in 2016

He was named 19th man for the final round of the tournament against England.

O'Neill was named as the 18th man for the 2017 ANZAC Test against New Zealand in May 2017. O'Neill was named at centre for the Queensland Maroons in Game I of the 2017 State of Origin Series. On 1 October, O'Neill started at centre in the Cowboys' 2017 NRL Grand Final loss to his former club, the Melbourne Storm.

In 2018, O'Neill played 21 games for the Cowboys, starting 17 of them at centre and four on the wing, scoring 2 tries. On 16 October 2018, the Cowboys' confirmed that O'Neill had taken up his player option to remain at the club for the 2019 season.

In 2019, after being dropped to the Townsville Blackhawks earlier in the season, O'Neill returned to first grade in great try scoring form, with eight tries in eight games. In May 2019, despite earlier reports, O'Neill revealed he had actually re-signed with the Cowboys for three seasons, not one.

In Round 11 of the 2019 NRL season, O'Neill suffered a severe spleen injury in the Cowboys' win over the Canberra Raiders, his 100th NRL game for the club. The following morning he was rushed to hospital where it was discovered that two broken ribs had punctured his spleen, causing internal bleeding. He underwent three blood transfusions and spent four days in the intensive care unit. Upon returning to Townsville, he spent a further six days in hospital after undergoing a second operation on his bowel.

In 2020, O'Neill successfully returned from his spleen injury, starting at centre in the Cowboys' Round 1 loss to the Brisbane Broncos. He played 17 games for the Cowboys in 2020, scoring six tries.

On 27 August 2021, O'Neill announced his immediate retirement from rugby league due to a chronic knee injury. He played just six games for the Cowboys in his final season with the club.

Since 2025, O'Neill has made some appearances for Victorian rugby league club Northern Thunder, playing alongside Young Tonumaipea in the Storm Premiership competition.

== Post playing ==
On 7 January 2024, O'Neill was announced as the assistant coach for the Melbourne Storm SG Ball squad with Matt Duffie named as head coach.

== Achievements and accolades ==
=== Team ===
- 2012 NRL Grand Final: Melbourne Storm – Winners
- 2013 World Club Challenge: Melbourne Storm – Winners
- 2015 NRL Grand Final: North Queensland Cowboys – Winners
- 2016 World Club Challenge: North Queensland Cowboys – Winners

== Statistics ==
=== NRL ===
Statistics are correct to the end of the 2021 season

†	Denotes seasons in which O'Neill won an NRL Premiership

Season	Team	Matches	T	G	GK %	F/G	Pts
2010	Melbourne	9	9	0	—	0	36
2011	Melbourne	12	5	0	—	0	20
2012†	Melbourne	21	11	0	—	0	44
2013	Melbourne	21	9	0	—	0	36
2014	Melbourne	4	0	0	—	0	0
2015†	North Queensland	26	13	0	—	0	52
2016	North Queensland	25	13	0	—	0	52
2017	North Queensland	20	1	0	—	0	4
2018	North Queensland	21	2	0	—	0	8
2019	North Queensland	8	8	0	—	0	32
2020	North Queensland	17	6	0	—	0	24
2021	North Queensland	6	1	0	—	0	4
Career totals		190	78	0	—	0	312

=== International ===
Season	Team	Matches	T	G	GK %	F/G	Pts
2016	Australia	2	0	0	—	0	0
Career totals		2	0	0	—	0	0

=== State of Origin ===
†	Denotes seasons in O'Neill won a State of Origin Series

Season	Team	Matches	T	G	GK %	F/G	Pts
2016†	Queensland	3	0	0	—	0	0
2017†	Queensland	1	0	0	—	0	0
Career totals		4	0	0	—	0	0

== Personal life ==
O'Neill and his wife Chantelle have two daughters, Giselle and Kasia. His younger brother, Samsen, played for the Cowboys' NYC side, while his older brother, Paul, has represented Vanuatu.
