= Kyle Feldt =

Australian rugby league & AFL player

Personal information
- Full name: Kyle Feldt
- Born: 9 February 1992 (age 34) Townsville, Queensland, Australia
- Height: 6 ft 3 in (1.91 m)
- Weight: 16 st 3 lb (103 kg)

Playing information
- Position: Wing
Club
Years	Team	Pld	T	G	FG	P
2013–24	North Qld Cowboys	217	151	44	0	692
2025–26	St Helens	29	33	32	0	196
	Total	246	184	76	0	888
Representative
Years	Team	Pld	T	G	FG	P
2015	Queensland Residents	1	1	0	0	4
2019	Prime Minister's XIII	1	2	0	0	8
2019	Australia 9s	5	4	0	0	17
2021	Queensland	2	0	0	0	0

Australian rules football
Club
Years	Team	Pld	G
2026–	Thuringowa Bulldogs	0	0
- Source: As of 22 November 2026

Kyle Feldt (born 9 February 1992) is an Australian professional rugby league footballer who last played as a winger for St Helens in the Super League.

Feldt has played for the Prime Minister's XIII, and was a member of the Cowboys' 2015 NRL Grand Final and 2016 World Club Challenge winning sides.

== Background ==
Feldt was born and raised in Townsville, Queensland, Australia. He grew up playing rugby union and was pursued by the Brumbies.

He played his junior football for the Norths Thuringowa Devils and attended Ignatius Park College before being signed by the North Queensland Cowboys. He is of Norwegian descent.

== Playing career ==
=== Early career ===
Feldt played his senior high-school football for Ignatius Park college in Townsville, playing in the Confraternity winning side with the likes of Michael Morgan, Jay Lobwein, Chris Grivsmuhl and Alex Alisalla, beating both St Brendan's Yepoon and Nudgee College in the process. In 2008, Feldt was selected for the Queensland under-16 team. In 2009, he played for the Townsville Stingers in the inaugural season of the Mal Meninga Cup. In 2010, Feldt was selected for the Queensland under-18 team.

From 2010 to 2012, Feldt played for North Queensland's under-20. On 30 August 2011, Feldt was named on the interchange bench in the 2011 NYC Team of the Year. He finished his NYC career as the competition's highest ever point scorer, with 570 points.

In the 2011 NYC Grand Final against the New Zealand Warriors, Feldt had the chance to win the premiership for the North Queensland, however he missed a simple conversion on the full-time siren, and the club lost the match in golden point extra time 31–30. On 16 October 2011, Feldt played for the Junior Kangaroos against the Junior Kiwis, playing on the wing in the 28–16 win at Hunter Stadium.

On 2 December 2011, Feldt extended his contract with North Queensland to the end of the 2014 season.

=== 2013 ===
In Round 21, Feldt made his NRL debut for the North Queensland Cowboys against the South Sydney Rabbitohs, on the wing in the 30–12 win at 1300SMILES Stadium. In round 22 against the Penrith Panthers, he scored his first NRL try in the 36–4 win at Penrith Stadium. After the round 23 match against the Gold Coast Titans, in which he scored two tries in the 22–10 win at 1300SMILES Stadium, Feldt injured his ankle at training, ending his debut season. Feldt finished his debut year in the NRL with three matches and three tries. He was awarded the North Queensland Rookie of the Year award.

=== 2014 ===
In February, Feldt played in North Queensland's successful 2014 Auckland Nines squad. He starred in the tournament, finishing as the highest try scorer, alongside Parramatta's Semi Radradra, with five tries, and was named Breakout Player of the Tournament. On 26 May, Feldt re-signed with North Queensland until the end of 2017. After the round 7 loss to the Manly-Warringah Sea Eagles, Feldt spent time in the Queensland Cup for the Northern Pride before earning an NRL recall in Round 24 to replace Matthew Wright, scoring two tries in the 22–10 win over South Sydney. Feldt finished off the season with 7 tries in 10 matches before returning to the Pride where he came off the bench and scored a try in their Queensland Cup Grand Final win over the Brisbane Tigers.

=== 2015 ===
In January 2015, Feldt was a member of the newly established QAS Emerging Maroons squad. He again played in the Auckland Nines. Feldt played in Round 2 and Round 3 before spending a big part of the season playing for the Townsville Blackhawks in the Queensland Cup. On 3 May, Feldt represented the Queensland Residents against the New South Wales Residents, playing at centre and scoring a try in the 36–32 win. Feldt returned to first grade in Round 24, scoring a hat-trick of tries in the match against the New Zealand Warriors at Mt Smart Stadium, which North Queensland won 50–16.

On 4 October, in North Queensland's Grand Final against the Brisbane Broncos, Feldt scored a try shortly after the full-time siren which levelled the scores and gave Johnathan Thurston a chance to win the match. Feldt scored in the corner after Thurston, pressured by Brisbane front rowers Adam Blair and Sam Thaiday, was forced to pass to Michael Morgan, who made a break down the right edge and flick passed to Feldt after drawing a defender. Thurston missed the subsequent kick after it hit the upright. Feldt then produced a kick off that forced a mistake from Brisbane halfback Ben Hunt which gave North Queensland the field position required for Thurston to kick the winning field goal to win the match 17–16. Feldt finished off his premiership winning 2015 NRL season having played in nine matches, scoring eight tries and kicking one goal.

=== 2016 ===
Feldt played in North Queensland's 2016 NRL Auckland Nines squad. On 21 February, he was a member of the Cowboys' 2016 World Club Challenge winning side, starting on the wing in the side's 38–4 victory over Leeds at Headingley Stadium. On 5 May, Feldt was named on the wing in QRL journalist Tony Webeck's Queensland Residents team of the past ten years. After showing good form in the early rounds, Feldt was in contention for the Queensland State of Origin squad but unfortunately after error riddled performances against the Brisbane Broncos and the St. George Illawarra Dragons, Feldt missed out on a wing spot to Corey Oates. He finished the season as the Cowboys' top try scorer, with 15 tries in 24 matches.

=== 2017 ===
In January, Feldt was a member of the QAS Emerging Origin squad, and played in the Auckland Nines for the 4th consecutive year. In round 4, he played his 50th NRL game. Soon after, he re-signed with North Queensland until the end of the 2020 season. In Round 16 against the Penrith Panthers, Feldt scored the try of the year by leaping in the air to catch a cross field kick from Michael Morgan, towering over Penrith winger Josh Mansour to score in the corner and tie the match at 12–12 all with a conversion to come in the 78th minute. North Queensland backup goal kicker Ethan Lowe nailed the kick from the sideline to win the match 14–12. North Queensland had a finals winning run into the 2017 NRL Grand Final. Feldt started on the wing in the Grand Final against the Melbourne Storm in which they lost convincingly 34–6. For the second straight season, Feldt finished the season as North Queensland's top try scorer with 15 tries in 28 matches.

=== 2018 ===
On 23 February 2018, Feldt starred in the testimonial match for Johnathan Thurston and Cameron Smith, as North Queensland played their last year grand final opponents the Melbourne Storm. He scored a hat-trick of tries, the third try coming from a Johnathan Thurston banana kick on the 5th tackle with 18 seconds to go, to steal a 16–14 victory. In June, in the lead up to Game 2 of the 2018 State of Origin series, Feldt was selected as 19th man for Queensland as cover for the backline. In Round 24, he scored his second NRL hat-trick in a 44–6 win over Parramatta.

He finished as the club's top try scorer for the third straight season, with 14 tries from 24 games. On 13 September, he was awarded the Coach's Award at the club's presentation ball.

=== 2019 ===
In the 2019 pre-season, Feldt suffered a serious groin injury, which ruled him out for the first eight weeks of the NRL season. He made his return in North Queensland's Round 9 loss to the South Sydney Rabbitohs. A week later, he played his 100th NRL game in North Queensland's 17–10 win over the Parramatta Eels. Feldt played in all 16 of North Queensland's remaining games following his return from injury, scoring 11 tries and finishing as the club's top try scorer for the fourth consecutive season.

On 11 October, Feldt started on the wing and scored two tries in the Prime Minister's XIII's 52–10 win over the Fiji Prime Minister's XIII side. On 19 October, Feldt was a member of Australia's 2019 Rugby League World Cup 9s winning squad. He scored four tries in the tournament, including one in Australia's 24–10 final win over New Zealand.

=== 2020 ===
In February, Feldt was a member of North Queensland's 2020 NRL Nines winning squad. He and teammate Jason Taumalolo became the first players to win two NRL Nines championships. On 3 June, he re-signed with the Cowboys until the end of the 2024 season.

Feldt played all 20 games for the North Queensland outfit in 2020, finishing as the club's top try scorer (19) and point scorer (122). For the fifth straight season, he scored more than 10 tries. In Round 20, he scored his third career hat trick in a 32–16 win over the Brisbane Broncos, Feldt was set to be the Top Try scorer in the NRL for 2020 till the next day when Alex Johnston scored five tries for South Sydney Rabbitohs in their 60–8 thrashing of the Sydney Roosters. On 3 October, he won the North Queensland Member's Player of the Year award for the second time.

=== 2021 ===
Feldt played 20 games for North Queensland in the 2021 NRL season and finished as the club's top try scorer with twelve tries. It was a disappointing season for North Queensland as they finished second last on the table.

=== 2022 ===
In round 8 of the 2022 NRL season, Feldt scored a hat-trick in North Queensland's 35–4 victory over Parramatta. In round 11, Feldt was taken from the field during North Queensland's victory against Melbourne after being hit in a cannonball tackle by Brandon Smith. Feldt was later ruled from playing for an indefinite period with a knee injury. Feldt played a total of 20 games for North Queensland in 2022 and scored eleven tries as the club finished third on the table after the regular season concluded. Feldt played in both finals matches which included the clubs upset preliminary final loss to Parramatta which denied North Queensland a Grand Final spot.

=== 2023 ===
Feldt played 18 games for North Queensland in the 2023 NRL season and scored 13 tries as the club finished 11th on the table.

=== 2024 ===
In round 5 of the 2024 NRL season, Feldt became North Queensland's record try scorer during the club's victory over the Gold Coast overtaking Matt Bowen's record.

In round 8, Feldt was inducted as a life member of the North Queensland Cowboys.

In round 21, Feldt scored a hat-trick in North Queensland's 30-22 victory over Cronulla. On 26 August, it was the announced that Feldt would depart the club at the end of the season. On the same day, Feldt signed a two-year deal with English side St Helens. In round 26, Feldt scored two tries for North Queensland in their 38-30 victory over Melbourne. The following week, Feldt scored his 150th try in the NRL as North Queensland defeated Canterbury 44-6.

=== 2025 ===
In round 1 of the 2025 Super League season, Feldt made his official club debut for St Helens and scored a try in their 82-0 victory over Salford. On 18 March, it was announced that Feldt would be ruled out for at least three months with a hand injury. In round 14, Feldt scored four tries and kicked three goals in St Helens 46-4 victory over Salford. In round 16, Feldt scored a hat-trick in St Helens 58-0 victory over Salford. In round 26, Feldt came under fire for faking injury during St Helens loss against Leigh. Feldt went down claiming to be hit in the head with a swinging arm but replays show he was not even touched. Feldt was given a green card by the referee and taken off the field for two minutes. In the wake of the defeat, Feldt was accused of simulation by pundits and fans. Feldt played a total of 18 games for St Helens in the 2025 Super League season. He missed their playoff matches due to injury.

=== 2026 ===
On 18 June, it was reported that Feldt had left St Helens with immediate effect.

On 12 July 2026 it was reported that he had switched codes to play Australian rules football in the AFL Townsville league. On 17 July, Feldt spoke of his early departure from St Helens stating to the media “I enjoyed 12 months of it and then a new coach came in and things started to change in a direction that I didn’t really like the way it was going".

In September, Feldt spoke further about his time at St Helens and gave advice to other NRL players who were considering moving to England stating "The only advice I would give is don’t set expectations real high, over there [England], the game is a lot different to over here [Australia]. The training facilities are completely different. Over here, we have high performance centres at every club but over there the money and backing isn’t as big so you’re going back a few years. The game itself is starting to change and to catch up to NRL. With the new rules coming in, it’s going to be good in the next couple of years but at this stage in my career, it was like I stood back in time. I enjoyed my time. I’m glad I did it, I can tick it off the bucket list, I wouldn’t go back again but I’ve ticked it off the bucket list".

== Achievements and accolades ==
=== Individual ===
- Dally M Try of the Year: 2017
- North Queensland Cowboys Coach's Award: 2018
- North Queensland Cowboys Member's Player of the Year: 2018, 2020
- North Queensland Cowboys Rookie of the Year: 2013
- NYC Team of the Year: 2011
- North Queensland Cowboys Life Member (2024)

=== Team ===
- 2014 NRL Auckland Nines: North Queensland Cowboys – Winners
- 2015 NRL Grand Final: North Queensland Cowboys – Winners
- 2016 World Club Challenge: North Queensland Cowboys – Winners
- 2019 Rugby League World Cup 9s: Australia – Winners
- 2020 NRL Nines: North Queensland Cowboys – Winners

== Statistics ==
=== NRL ===
*denotes season still competing

†	Denotes seasons in which Feldt won an NRL Premiership

Season	Team	Matches	T	G	GK %	F/G	Pts
2013	North Queensland	3	3	0	—	0	12
2014	North Queensland	10	7	0	0	0	28
2015†	North Queensland	9	8	1	25.0	0	34
2016	North Queensland	24	15	0	—	0	60
2017	North Queensland	28	15	17	70.8	0	94
2018	North Queensland	24	14	1	100	0	58
2019	North Queensland	16	11	2	100	0	48
2020	North Queensland	20	19	23	63.9	0	122
2021	North Queensland	20	12	0	0	0	48
2022	North Queensland	20	11	0	0	0	44
2023	North Queensland	18	13	0	0	0	52
2024	North Queensland	24	23	0	0	0	92
2025	St. Helens	18	21	32			148
2026	St. Helens	10	11				44
Career totals		245	183	76	63.7	0	884
