= 2015 North Queensland Cowboys season =

21st season in the club history

Coordinates: 27°27′53″S 153°0′34″E

- 2015 NRL premiers
- NRL Rank: 3rd
- Play-off result: Premiers
- 2015 record: Wins: 17; draws: 0; losses: 7
- Points scored: For: 587; against: 454

Team information
- CEO: Greg Tonner
- Coach: Paul Green
- Captain: Johnathan Thurston Matthew Scott
- Stadium: 1300SMILES Stadium
- Avg. attendance: 16,230
- High attendance: 24,531 (vs. Brisbane Broncos, Round 10)

Top scorers
- Tries: Antonio Winterstein (16)
- Goals: Johnathan Thurston (93)
- Points: Johnathan Thurston (208)
← 2014	2016 →

The 2015 North Queensland Cowboys season was the 21st in the club's history. The team is based in Townsville, Queensland, Australia. Coached by Paul Green and co-captained by Johnathan Thurston and Matthew Scott, they competed in the NRL's 2015 Telstra Premiership. The Cowboys celebrated 20 years as a club in 2015 and played in the first all-Queensland grand final, defeating the Brisbane Broncos 17–16 in golden point to win their first premiership.

== Season summary ==
After going through their pre-season trials undefeated, the Cowboys started their 2015 season with three straight losses. The side hit back with three consecutive wins on Monday Night Football over the Melbourne Storm, Penrith Panthers and South Sydney Rabbitohs, on their way to a club record 11-game winning streak. The Cowboys finished in 3rd place, winning 17 games, giving the club their most successful regular season in its history.

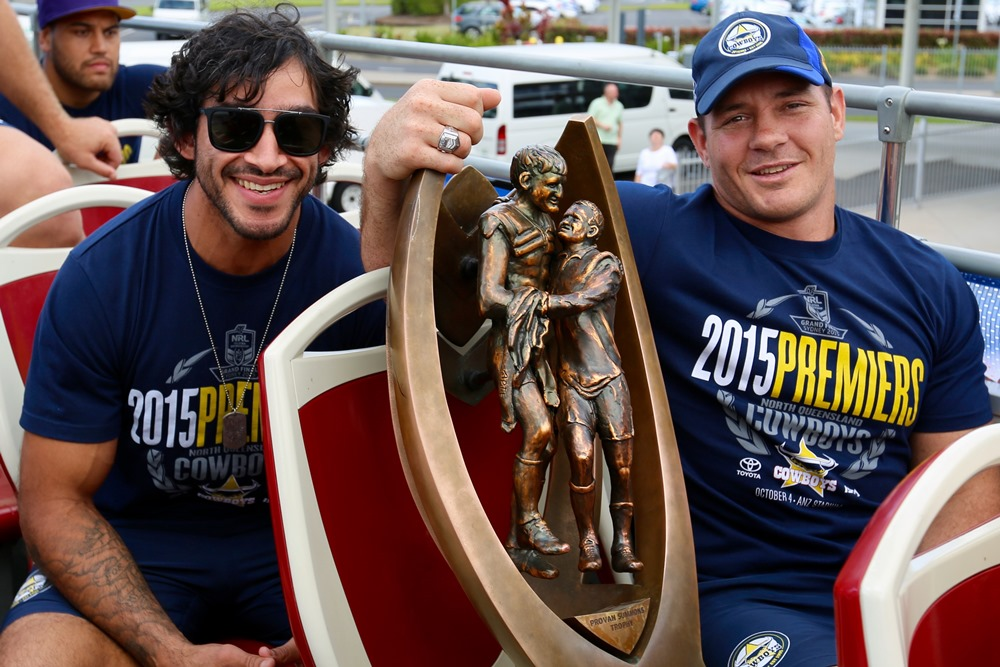
Johnathan Thurston & Matt Scott

=== Milestones ===
- Round 1: Jake Granville, Ben Hannant and Justin O'Neill made their debut for the club.
- Round 2: Kelepi Tanginoa made his debut for the club.
- Round 3: Lachlan Coote made his debut for the club.
- Round 3: Kane Linnett played his 100th NRL game.
- Round 7: Ben Hannant played his 200th NRL game.
- Round 7: Johnathan Thurston played his 250th NRL game.
- Round 11: The club played their 500th premiership game.
- Round 15: The club recorded their longest winning streak with their 11th straight win.
- Round 15: Rory Kostjasyn played his 50th game for the club.
- Round 16: Patrick Kaufusi made his NRL debut.
- Round 19: Gavin Cooper played his 200th NRL game.
- Round 21: Lachlan Coote played his 100th NRL game.
- Round 21: Matthew Scott played his 200th game for the club.
- Round 22: Antonio Winterstein played his 100th game for the club.
- Round 22: Antonio Winterstein scored his 50th try for the club.
- Round 24: Coen Hess made his NRL debut.
- Round 24: Coen Hess scored his first NRL try.
- Round 25: Antonio Winterstein played his 150th NRL game.
- Round 26: The club won the 2015 NRL Club Championship.
- Round 26: Paul Green coached his 50th NRL game.
- Finals Week 2: Kane Linnett played his 100th game for the club.
- Finals Week 3: Scott Bolton played his 150th game for the club.
- Finals Week 3: The club qualified for their second Grand Final.
- Grand Final: Rory Kostjasyn played his 100th NRL game.
- Grand Final: The club won its first NRL premiership.

== Squad List ==
=== 2015 NRL Squad ===
North Queensland Cowboys NRL Squad 2015
First team squad			Coaching staff
John Asiata – LK, SR; Scott Bolton – PR; Javid Bowen – CE, WG; Josh Chudleigh – HK; Gavin Cooper – SR; Lachlan Coote – FB; Kyle Feldt – WG; Jake Granville – HK; Glenn Hall – SR; Ben Hannant – PR; Coen Hess – SR	Sam Hoare – PR; Patrick Kaufusi – PR; Cameron King – HK; Rory Kostjasyn – HK, LK; Kane Linnett – CE; Ethan Lowe – SR, LK; Robert Lui – HB, FE; Tautau Moga – CE, WG; Michael Morgan – FB, HB; Hezron Murgha – FB; Justin O'Neill – CE, WG	Zac Santo – FB; Matthew Scott (c) – PR; Ben Spina – PR; James Tamou – PR; Kelepi Tanginoa – SR; Jason Taumalolo – SR; Ray Thompson – HK, HB; Johnathan Thurston (c) – HB, FE; Antonio Winterstein – WG, CE; Matthew Wright – FB, WG	Head coach: Paul Green; Assistant coaches: David Furner (assistant coach); Jason Demetriou (assistant coach); John Cartwright (assistant coach); Todd Payten (NYC Coach/Assistant Coach); Paul Bowman (High Performance Manager); Steve Sartori (physiotherapist); Andrew Croll (strength & conditioning coach); Mark Henry (assistant strength & conditioning coach); Ashley Graham (Elite Pathways Performance Coach); Legend: (c) Captain(s); (vc) Vice-captain(s); Updated: 16 February 2015; Source(s): Cowboys Squad 2015

== Squad Movement ==
=== 2015 Gains ===
Player	Signed from	Until end of	Notes
Jake Granville	Brisbane Broncos	2016	
Ben Hannant	Brisbane Broncos	2015	
Justin O'Neill	Melbourne Storm	2016	
Kelepi Tanginoa	Parramatta Eels	2016	

=== 2015 losses ===
Player	Signed to	Until end of	Notes
Anthony Mitchell	Townsville Blackhawks	2016	
Curtis Rona	Canterbury Bulldogs	2016	
Ashton Sims	Warrington Wolves	2016	
Tariq Sims	Newcastle Knights	2016	
Brent Tate	Retired	-	
Ricky Thorby	Townsville Blackhawks	2016	
Joel Riethmuller	Released	-	

=== Re-signings ===
Player	Club	Until end of	Notes
John Asiata	North Queensland Cowboys	2017	
Scott Bolton	North Queensland Cowboys	2017	
Josh Chudleigh	North Queensland Cowboys	2016	
Ben Hannant	North Queensland Cowboys	2016	
Coen Hess	North Queensland Cowboys	2018	
Kyle Laybutt	North Queensland Cowboys	2017	
Ethan Lowe	North Queensland Cowboys	2016	
Michael Morgan	North Queensland Cowboys	2018	
Gideon Gela-Mosby	North Queensland Cowboys	2017	
Ben Spina	North Queensland Cowboys	2017	
Jason Taumalolo	North Queensland Cowboys	2017	
Ray Thompson	North Queensland Cowboys	2017	

== Ladder ==
2015 NRL season
Pos	Team	Pld	W	D	L	B	PF	PA	PD	Pts
1	Sydney Roosters	24	18	0	6	2	591	300	+291	40
2	Brisbane Broncos	24	17	0	7	2	574	379	+195	38
3	North Queensland Cowboys (P)	24	17	0	7	2	587	454	+133	38
4	Melbourne Storm	24	14	0	10	2	467	348	+119	32
5	Canterbury-Bankstown Bulldogs	24	14	0	10	2	522	480	+42	32
6	Cronulla-Sutherland Sharks	24	14	0	10	2	469	476	−7	32
7	South Sydney Rabbitohs	24	13	0	11	2	465	467	−2	30
8	St. George Illawarra Dragons	24	12	0	12	2	435	408	+27	28
9	Manly-Warringah Sea Eagles	24	11	0	13	2	458	492	−34	26
10	Canberra Raiders	24	10	0	14	2	577	569	+8	24
11	Penrith Panthers	24	9	0	15	2	399	477	−78	22
12	Parramatta Eels	24	9	0	15	2	448	573	−125	22
13	New Zealand Warriors	24	9	0	15	2	445	588	−143	22
14	Gold Coast Titans	24	9	0	15	2	439	636	−197	22
15	Wests Tigers	24	8	0	16	2	487	562	−75	20
16	Newcastle Knights	24	8	0	16	2	458	612	−154	20

== Fixtures ==
=== NRL Auckland Nines ===
The NRL Auckland Nines is a pre-season rugby league nines competition featuring all 16 NRL clubs. The 2015 competition was played over two days on January 31 and February 1 at Eden Park in Auckland, New Zealand. The Cowboys featured in the Waiheke pool and played Melbourne, Penrith and South Sydney. The top two teams of each pool qualified for the quarter-finals. The Cowboys, who were the defending champions, were knocked out in the quarter-finals.

==== Pool Play ====
Waiheke pool
Team	Pld	W	D	L	PF	PA	PD	Pts
South Sydney Rabbitohs	3	3	0	0	54	20	+34	6
North Qld Cowboys	3	2	0	1	43	35	+8	4
Melbourne Storm	3	1	0	2	32	45	-13	2
Penrith Panthers	3	0	0	3	16	45	-29	0

Date	Time (Local)	Round	Opponent	Venue	Score	Tries	Goals
Saturday, 31 January	1:20pm	Round 1	Melbourne Storm	Eden Park	17 – 8	Lowe (bonus try), O'Neill, Wright	Wright (2)
Saturday, 31 January	5:40pm	Round 2	South Sydney Rabbitohs	Eden Park	12 – 19	O'Neill (2), Cooper	-
Sunday, 1 February	12:25pm	Round 3	Penrith Panthers	Eden Park	14 – 8	Feldt, Moga, Taumalolo	Lui (1)
Sunday, 1 February	2:30pm	Quarter-final	Parramatta Eels	Eden Park	11 – 17	Granville (bonus try), O'Neill	Morgan (1)
Legend: Win Loss

=== Pre-season ===
Date	Round	Opponent	Venue	Score	Tries	Goals	Attendance
Saturday, 7 February	Trial 1	Brisbane Broncos	Stadium Mackay	18 – 6	Feldt, Granville, Lui	Feldt (3)	-
Saturday, 14 February	Trial 2	Townsville Blackhawks	Jack Manski Oval	24 – 12	Bowen, Feldt, Kikau, King, Niemoeller	Bambling (1), Feldt (1)	-
Saturday, 21 February	Trial 3	Gold Coast Titans	Barlow Park	30 – 10	Moga (2), Cooper, Granville, Tanginoa, Wright	Thurston (3)	-
Legend: Win Loss Draw

=== Regular season ===
Date	Round	Opponent	Venue	Score	Tries	Goals	Attendance
Saturday, 7 March	Round 1	Sydney Roosters	1300SMILES Stadium	4 – 28	O'Neill	Thurston (0/1)	17,123
Saturday, 14 March	Round 2	Newcastle Knights	1300SMILES Stadium	14 – 16	Lowe, Scott	Thurston (3/3), Feldt (0/1)	13,006
Friday, 20 March	Round 3	Brisbane Broncos	Suncorp Stadium	22 – 44	Feldt (2), Morgan, O'Neill	Thurston (3/4)	40,047
Monday, 30 March	Round 4	Melbourne Storm	1300SMILES Stadium	18 – 17	Winterstein (2), Wright	Thurston (2/3, 2 FG)	11,609
Monday, 6 April	Round 5	Penrith Panthers	Sportingbet Stadium	30 – 10	Wright (3), Coote, Lowe	Thurston (5/6)	8,409
Monday, 13 April	Round 6	South Sydney Rabbitohs	ANZ Stadium	30 – 12	Thurston (2) Granville, O'Neill, Winterstein	Thurston (5/6)	13,866
Saturday, 18 April	Round 7	New Zealand Warriors	1300SMILES Stadium	28 – 24	Granville (3), Coote, Linnett	Thurston (4/5)	16,038
Saturday, 25 April	Round 8	Newcastle Knights	Hunter Stadium	26 – 24	O'Neill (2), Bolton, Coote, Morgan	Thurston (3/5)	15,518
Saturday, 9 May	Round 9	Canterbury Bulldogs	1300SMILES Stadium	23 – 16	Morgan (2), Cooper, Wright	Thurston (3/5, 1 FG)	15,794
Friday, 15 May	Round 10	Brisbane Broncos	1300SMILES Stadium	31 – 20	Morgan (3), Cooper, Lowe	Thurston (4/5), Coote (1 FG)	24,531
Saturday, 23 May	Round 11	Wests Tigers	Campbelltown Stadium	8 – 0	Winterstein	Lowe (2/2)	8267
Saturday, 30 May	Round 12	Manly Sea Eagles	1300SMILES Stadium	18 – 14	Scott (2), Cooper	Thurston (3/3)	14,196
Monday, 8 June	Round 13	Parramatta Eels	Pirtek Stadium	36 – 30	Cooper (3), Linnett, Morgan, Wright	Thurston (6/6)	9812
	Round 14	Bye					
Saturday, 20 June	Round 15	Canberra Raiders	GIO Stadium	21 – 20	Cooper, Winterstein, Wright	Thurston (4/5, 1 FG)	10,170
Saturday, 27 June	Round 16	Cronulla Sharks	1300SMILES Stadium	18 – 24	Granville, O'Neill, Winterstein	Lowe (3/4)	18,826
Saturday, 4 July	Round 17	St George Illawarra Dragons	WIN Stadium	18 – 12	Linnett (2), Granville	Lowe (3/4)	11,183
	Round 18	Bye					
Monday, 20 July	Round 19	Manly Sea Eagles	Brookvale Oval	30 – 12	Winterstein (2), Granville, Linnett, Morgan	Thurston (5/6)	7,643
Monday, 27 July	Round 20	Parramatta Eels	1300SMILES Stadium	46 – 4	Taumalolo (2), Coote, Kostjasyn, Linnett, Winterstein, Wright	Thurston (7/8)	13,767
Saturday, 1 August	Round 21	Canberra Raiders	1300SMILES Stadium	32 – 24	Winterstein (2), Cooper, Granville, Morgan	Thurston (6/7)	16,207
Saturday, 8 August	Round 22	Cronulla Sharks	Remondis Stadium	18 – 30	Linnett, Winterstein, Wright	Thurston (3/4)	13,878
Thursday, 13 August	Round 23	South Sydney Rabbitohs	1300SMILES Stadium	18 – 31	Coote, Morgan, O'Neill	Thurston (3/3)	16,685
Saturday, 22 August	Round 24	New Zealand Warriors	Mt Smart Stadium	50 – 16	Feldt (3), O'Neill (2), Hess, Linnett, Spina, Thurston	Thurston (7/9)	14,412
Saturday, 29 August	Round 25	Melbourne Storm	AAMI Park	6 – 14	Feldt	Thurston (1/1)	15,214
Saturday, 5 September	Round 26	Gold Coast Titans	1300SMILES Stadium	42 – 12	Linnett (2), Winterstein (2), Cooper, Coote, Granville, Tamou, Thompson	Thurston (2/4), Feldt (1/3), Lowe (0/2)	16,977
Legend: Win Loss Draw Bye

=== Finals ===
Qualifying and elimination finals
11 Sept, Sydney Football Stadium
1	Sydney Roosters	18
4	Melbourne	20
12 Sept, Stadium Australia
5	Canterbury	11
8	St. George Illawarra	10
13 Sept, Sydney Football Stadium
6	Cronulla	28
7	Souths	12
12 Sept, Lang Park
2	Brisbane	16
3	North Queensland	12

Semi-finals
18 Sept, Sydney Football Stadium
Sydney Roosters	38
Canterbury	12
19 Sept, Willows Sports Complex
North Queensland	39
Cronulla	0

Preliminary finals
26 Sept, Melbourne Rectangular Stadium
Melbourne	12
North Queensland	32
25 Sept, Lang Park
Brisbane	31
Sydney Roosters	12

Grand final
4 Oct, Stadium Australia
Brisbane	16
North Queensland	17

Date	Round	Opponent	Venue	Score	Tries	Goals	Attendance
Saturday, 12 September	Qualifying Final	Brisbane Broncos	Suncorp Stadium	16 – 12	Thurston, Winterstein	Thurston (2/3)	50,388
Saturday, 19 September	Semi-final	Cronulla Sharks	1300SMILES Stadium	39 – 0	Michael Morgan (2), Bolton, Feldt, Lowe, O'Neill, Winterstein	Thurston (5/8, 1 FG)	21,683
Saturday, 26 September	Preliminary Final	Melbourne Storm	AAMI Park	32 –12	Cooper (2), Michael Morgan (2), O'Neill (2)	Thurston (4/6)	29,315
Sunday, 4 October	Grand Final	Brisbane Broncos	ANZ Stadium	17 – 16	Feldt, O'Neill, Tamou	Thurston (2/3, 1 FG)	82,758
Legend: Win Loss Draw

== Statistics ==
Name	App	T	G	FG	Pts
John Asiata	25	-	-	-	-
Scott Bolton	20	2	-	-	8
Gavin Cooper	27	11	-	-	44
Lachlan Coote	26	6	-	1	25
Kyle Feldt	9	8	1	-	34
Jake Granville	28	10	-	-	40
Glenn Hall	3	-	-	-	-
Ben Hannant	28	-	-	-	-
Coen Hess	1	1	-	-	4
Sam Hoare	9	-	-	-	-
Patrick Kaufusi	1	-	-	-	-
Cameron King	2	-	-	-	-
Rory Kostjasyn	23	1	-	-	4
Kane Linnett	28	10	-	-	40
Ethan Lowe	28	4	8	-	32
Robert Lui	4	-	-	-	-
Tautau Moga	6	-	-	-	-
Michael Morgan	23	15	-	-	60
Justin O'Neill	26	13	-	-	52
Matthew Scott	25	3	-	-	12
Ben Spina	5	1	-	-	4
James Tamou	24	2	-	-	8
Kelepi Tanginoa	3	-	-	-	-
Jason Taumalolo	26	2	-	-	8
Ray Thompson	9	1	-	-	4
Johnathan Thurston	25	4	93	6	208
Antonio Winterstein	26	16	-	-	64
Matthew Wright	17	9	-	-	36
Totals		119	102	7	687

== Representatives ==
The following players have played a representative match in 2015

	All Stars match	ANZAC Test	Melanesian Cup	Polynesian Cup	State of Origin 1	State Of Origin 2	State of Origin 3
Viliame Kikau	-	-	Fiji	-	-	-	-
Tautau Moga	-	-	-	Samoa	-	-	-
Michael Morgan	-	-	-	-	Queensland	Queensland	Queensland
Matthew Scott	-	Australia	-	-	Queensland	Queensland	Queensland
James Tamou	-	Australia	-	-	New South Wales	New South Wales	New South Wales
Jason Taumalolo	NRL All Stars	-	-	-	-	-	-
Ray Thompson	Indigenous All Stars	-	Papua New Guinea	-	-	-	-
Johnathan Thurston	Indigenous All Stars	Australia	-	-	Queensland	Queensland	Queensland
Antonio Winterstein	NRL All Stars	-	-	-	-	-	-

== Honours ==
=== League ===
- Golden Boot: Johnathan Thurston
- Clive Churchill Medal: Johnathan Thurston
- Dally M Medal: Johnathan Thurston
- Dally M Halfback of the Year: Johnathan Thurston
- Dally M Lock of the Year: Jason Taumalolo
- Dally M Captain of the Year: Matthew Scott and Johnathan Thurston
- Rugby League Players Association Player of the Year: Johnathan Thurston
- NYC Team of the Year: Gideon Gela-Mosby, Coen Hess, Viliame Kikau

=== Club ===
- Paul Bowman Medal: Johnathan Thurston
- Players' Player: Jake Granville
- Member's Player of the Year: Jake Granville
- Club Person of the Year: Glenn Hall
- Most Improved: Justin O'Neill
- Rookie of the Year: Coen Hess
- NYC Player of the Year: Andrew Niemoeller
- Townsville Bulletin's Fan Choice Award: Johnathan Thurston

== Feeder Clubs ==
=== National Youth Competition ===
- North Queensland Cowboys - 2nd, lost preliminary final

=== Queensland Cup ===
- Mackay Cutters - 8th, missed finals
- Northern Pride - 6th, lost elimination final
- Townsville Blackhawks - 1st, lost Grand Final
