= Coen Hess =

Australian rugby league footballer

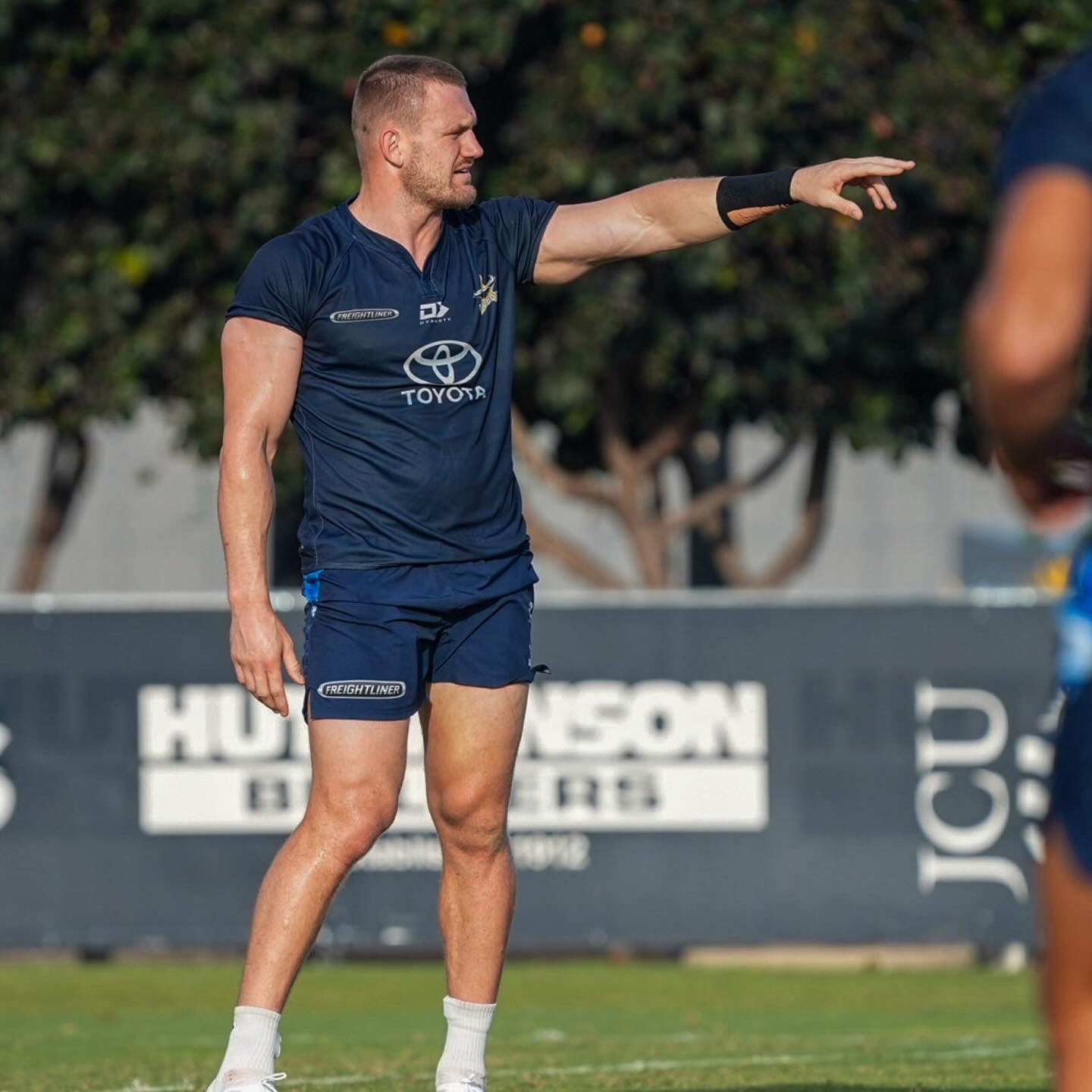

Personal information
- Born: 14 August 1996 (age 30) Bundaberg, Queensland, Australia
- Height: 190 cm (6 ft 3 in)
- Weight: 114 kg (17 st 13 lb)

Playing information
- Position: Second-row, Prop
Club
| Years | Team | Pld | T | G | FG | P |
|---|---|---|---|---|---|---|
| 2015– | North Qld Cowboys | 211 | 36 | 0 | 0 | 144 |
Representative
| Years | Team | Pld | T | G | FG | P |
| 2017–20 | Queensland | 6 | 0 | 0 | 0 | 0 |
- Source: As of 12 September 2026

Coen Hess (born 14 August 1996) is an Australian professional rugby league footballer who plays as a second-row or prop forward for the North Queensland Cowboys in the National Rugby League (NRL).

He has played at representative level for Queensland in the State of Origin series.

== Background ==
Hess was born in Bundaberg, Queensland, Australia and lived in the town until the age of 8.

While in Bundaberg, he played junior rugby league for the Across The Waves Tigers club and attended St Patrick's Catholic School. He then moved with his family to Mount Isa, where he played for the Mount Isa Black Stars.

== Playing career ==
In 2012, Hess represented the Queensland under-16 side. In 2014, Hess made his NYC debut for the Cowboys, scoring a try in his side's loss to the Newcastle Knights. Later that year he represented the Queensland under-18 side and was a member of the Townsville Stingers' victorious Mal Meninga Cup and National Under-18 Championship sides.

=== 2015 ===
In January 2015, Hess was a member of Queensland's Emerging Maroons squad and played for the Cowboys in the 2015 NRL Auckland Nines tournament. On 19 March 2015, Hess re-signed with the Cowboys for a further three seasons. On 2 May 2015, Hess represented the Junior Kangaroos against Junior Kiwis, starting at second-row in the 22-20 win at Robina Stadium. On 8 July 2015, Hess would represent for Queensland Under 20s against New South Wales Under 20s, starting at second-row in the 32-16 loss at Suncorp Stadium. In June 2015, Hess made his Queensland Cup debut for the Mackay Cutters, scoring two tries and setting up another in their 28-18 victory over the Redcliffe Dolphins in which Hess was given man of the match honours. In Round 24 of the 2015 NRL season, Hess made his first-grade debut for the North Queensland Cowboys, playing off the interchange bench, scoring a try on debut in North Queensland's impressive 50-16 win at Mt Smart Stadium. This was Hess's only NRL match in the season. On 14 September 2015, Hess was named at second-row in the 2015 NYC Team of the Year.

=== 2016 ===
On 6 January, Hess was selected in the QAS under-20s Origin squad. In February 2016, Hess was selected in North Queensland's 2016 NRL Auckland Nines squad. In Round 12 against the St George Illawarra Dragons, Hess made his first appearance in North Queensland's first grade team for 2016, playing off the interchange bench in the 14-10 loss at WIN Stadium. In North Queensland's sudden-death semi final match against Queensland rivals the Brisbane Broncos, Hess started at second-row for the injured Ethan Lowe, playing the whole 90 minutes, scoring a try and ran 188 metres as North Queensland won 26-20 in extra time at 1300SMILES Stadium. Hess would start again at second-row for North Queensland's Preliminary Final match against the Cronulla-Sutherland Sharks, scoring a try in the 32-20 loss at Sydney Football Stadium. Hess finished the 2016 NRL season with him playing in 8 matches and scoring 4 tries for North Queensland.

=== 2017 ===
In January 2017, Hess was selected in the QAS Emerging Origin squad. In February 2017, Hess was selected in the Cowboys 2017 NRL Auckland Nines squad. After showing impressive form for North Queensland, scoring 10 tries in 13 matches, Hess was in contention to make into the Queensland State of Origin squad. After Queensland were beaten convincingly by New South Wales 28-4 in Game 1 of the 2017 State of Origin series, the Maroons squad had a major cleanout and Hess was selected to make his representative debut for Queensland in Game 2 of the series, playing off the interchange bench in the Maroons 18-16 win at ANZ Stadium. Hess would also play in Game 3 off the interchange bench in the Maroons series 22-6 win at Suncorp Stadium. On 1 October 2017, in North Queensland's 2017 NRL Grand Final against the Melbourne Storm Hess played off the interchange bench in the 34-6 defeat at ANZ Stadium. Hess finished his impressive 2017 NRL season with him being the North Queensland club's second highest tryscorer with 13 tries in 27 matches.

=== 2018 ===
Hess became a regular starter at second row for the North Queensland outfit in the 2018 NRL season. Of his 23 games for the side, he started in 19 of them. He was once again selected for Queensland, playing all three games off the interchange in the 2018 State of Origin series.

On 14 December 2018, Hess signed a three-year extension with the North Queensland club until the end of the 2022 season.

=== 2019 ===
Hess played 22 games for the North Queensland club, starting eight games at second row and four at centre. In a disappointing season, Hess lost his starting second row position for North Queensland and his spot in the Queensland side. He scored just one try, his lowest try tally since his debut season in 2015.

=== 2020 ===
In February, Hess was a member of the North Queensland club's 2020 NRL Nines winning squad, scoring three tries in the tournament. Hess played 15 games in 2020, starting all 15 at second-row and scoring three tries. Following a Round 16 loss to the Cronulla-Sutherland Sharks, Hess was charged with a crusher tackle and was suspended for one game.

In October, Hess was named in the Queensland State of Origin squad, starting at second-row in their 18–14 Game 1 win over New South Wales.

=== 2021 ===
In June, Hess was 18th man for the Queensland State of Origin squads for both Games I and II. In Game III, he was rushed into the side as 19th man.

=== 2022 ===
Hess played a total of 23 games and scored 1 try for North Queensland in 2022 as the club reached the preliminary final before losing to Parramatta 24-20.

=== 2023 ===
Hess played a total of 24 games and scored 2 tries for North Queensland in the 2023 NRL season as the club finished 11th on the table.

=== 2024 ===
Hess was ruled out of the entire season after suffering an ACL injury in a trial match in the pre-season. In May 2024, Hess has re-signed with the club on a three year extension.

=== 2025 ===
Hess played 21 matches for North Queensland in the 2025 NRL season as the club finished 12th on the table.

=== 2026 ===
On 5 June, North Queensland announced that they had inducted Hess as a life member of the club. Hess played 25 games for North Queensland in the 2026 NRL season as the club finished 8th and qualified for the finals. Hess played in the clubs elimination final loss to Cronulla.

== Achievements and accolades ==
=== Individual ===
- North Queensland Cowboys Rookie of the Year: 2015
- NYC Team of the Year: 2015
- North Queensland Cowboys Player of the Year: 2021
- 2026 Inducted as Life Member

=== Team ===
- 2020 NRL Nines: North Queensland Cowboys – Winners

== Statistics ==
=== NRL ===
Statistics are correct to the end of the 2025 season

| Season | Team | Matches | T | G | GK % | F/G | Pts |
|---|---|---|---|---|---|---|---|
| 2015 | North Queensland | 1 | 1 | 0 | – | 0 | 4 |
| 2016 | North Queensland | 8 | 4 | 0 | – | 0 | 16 |
| 2017 | North Queensland | 27 | 13 | 0 | – | 0 | 52 |
| 2018 | North Queensland | 23 | 7 | 0 | – | 0 | 28 |
| 2019 | North Queensland | 22 | 1 | 0 | — | 0 | 4 |
| 2020 | North Queensland | 15 | 3 | 0 | — | 0 | 12 |
| 2021 | North Queensland | 22 | 2 | | | | 8 |
| 2022 | North Queensland | 23 | 1 | | | | 4 |
| 2023 | North Queensland | 24 | 2 | | | | 8 |
| 2025 | North Queensland | 21 | 1 | | | | 4 |
| 2026 | North Queensland | 8 | 1 | | | | 4 |
| Career totals | | 194 | 36 | 0 | — | 0 | 144 |

=== State of Origin ===
| † | Denotes seasons in which Hess won a State of Origin Series |

| Season | Team | Matches | T | G | GK % | F/G | Pts |
|---|---|---|---|---|---|---|---|
| 2017† | Queensland | 2 | 0 | 0 | — | 0 | 0 |
| 2018 | Queensland | 3 | 0 | 0 | — | 0 | 0 |
| 2020† | Queensland | 1 | 0 | 0 | — | 0 | 0 |
| Career totals | | 6 | 0 | 0 | — | 0 | 0 |
