= Kelepi Tanginoa =

Australian professional rugby league footballer

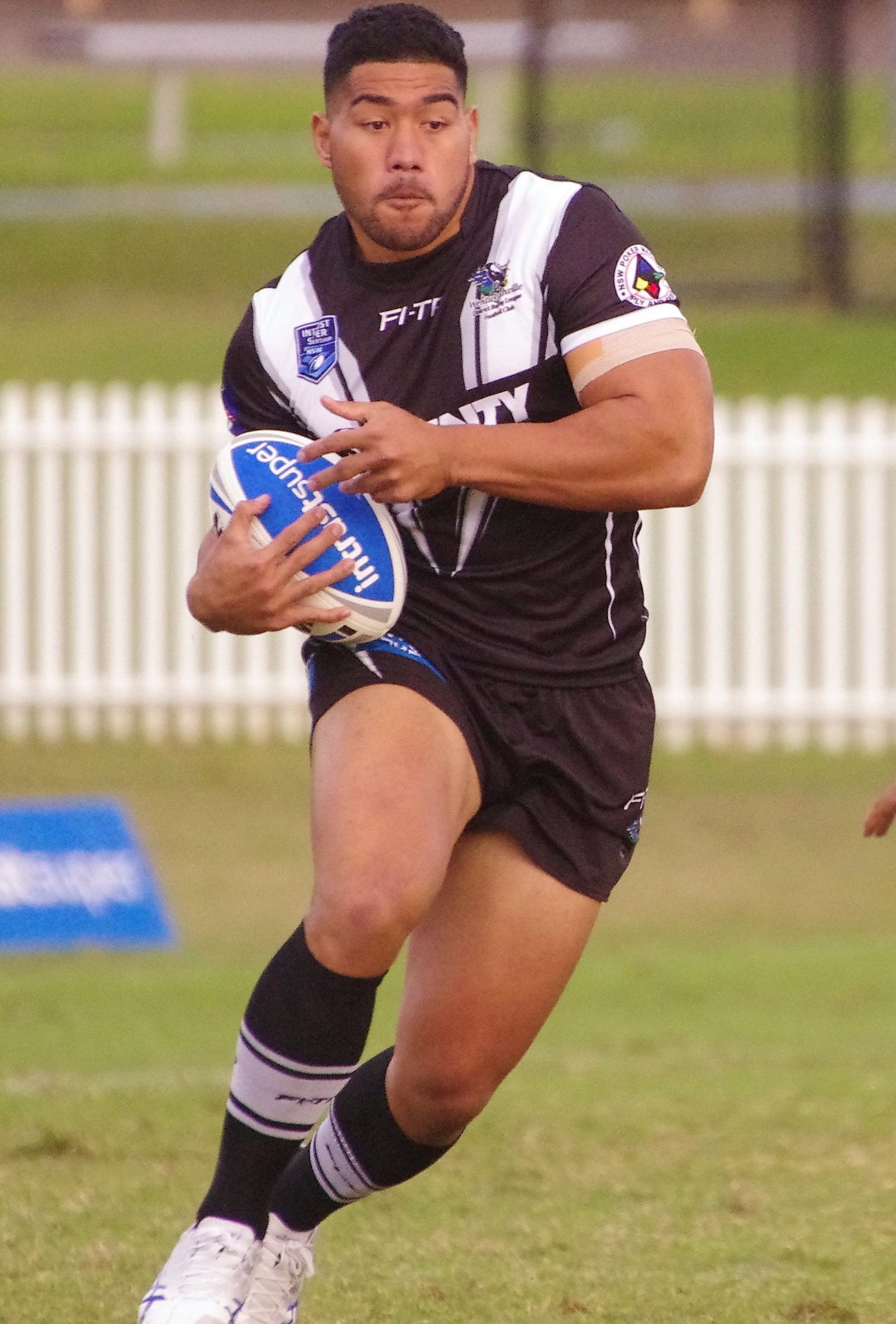

Personal information
- Full name: Kelepi Tanginoa
- Born: 1 March 1994 (age 32) Auburn, New South Wales, Australia
- Height: 5 ft 11 in (1.81 m)
- Weight: 15 st 13 lb (101 kg)

Playing information
- Position: Prop, Second-row, Loose forward
Club
Years	Team	Pld	T	G	FG	P
2013–14	Parramatta Eels	13	0	0	0	0
2015	North Qld Cowboys	3	0	0	0	0
2017–19	Manly Sea Eagles	16	0	0	0	0
2019–23	Wakefield Trinity	88	21	0	0	72
2024–25	Hull Kingston Rovers	59	16	0	0	64
2026–	Warrington Wolves	27	4	0	0	0
	Total	206	41	0	0	136
Representative
Years	Team	Pld	T	G	FG	P
2021–22	Combined Nations All Stars	2	0	0	0	0
- Source: As of 22 November 2026

Kelepi Tanginoa (/kəlɛpi tæŋɡənoʊə/) (born 1 March 1994) is an Australian professional rugby league footballer who plays as a prop, second-row forward and loose forward for the Warrington Wolves in the Super League.

He previously played for Wakefield Trinity and Hull KR in the Super League and the Parramatta Eels, North Queensland Cowboys and the Manly-Warringah Sea Eagles in the NRL.

== Background ==
Tanginoa was born in Auburn, New South Wales, Australia.

He played his junior football for the Canley Heights Dragons, CVD Edensor Park Cobras and Cabramatta Two Blues before being signed by the Parramatta Eels, playing for their Harold Matthews Cup, SG Ball Cup and NYC teams. He attended Westfields Sport High School where he represented the Australian Schoolboys in 2012. In 2010, Tanginoa represented the New South Wales under-16s side and in 2012 represented the New South Wales under-18s.

== Playing career ==
=== 2013 ===
In round 2 of the 2013 NRL season, Tanginoa made his NRL debut for the Eels against the Canterbury-Bankstown Bulldogs. In April, Tanginoa played for the New South Wales Under 20s team. He played 9 games for Parramatta in his rookie year before succumbing to a fractured hand and then a stress fracture in his right foot. Parramatta would finish the 2013 NRL season in last place on the table for the second consecutive year.

In July 2013, Tanginoa re-signed with the Parramatta club on a two-year contract.

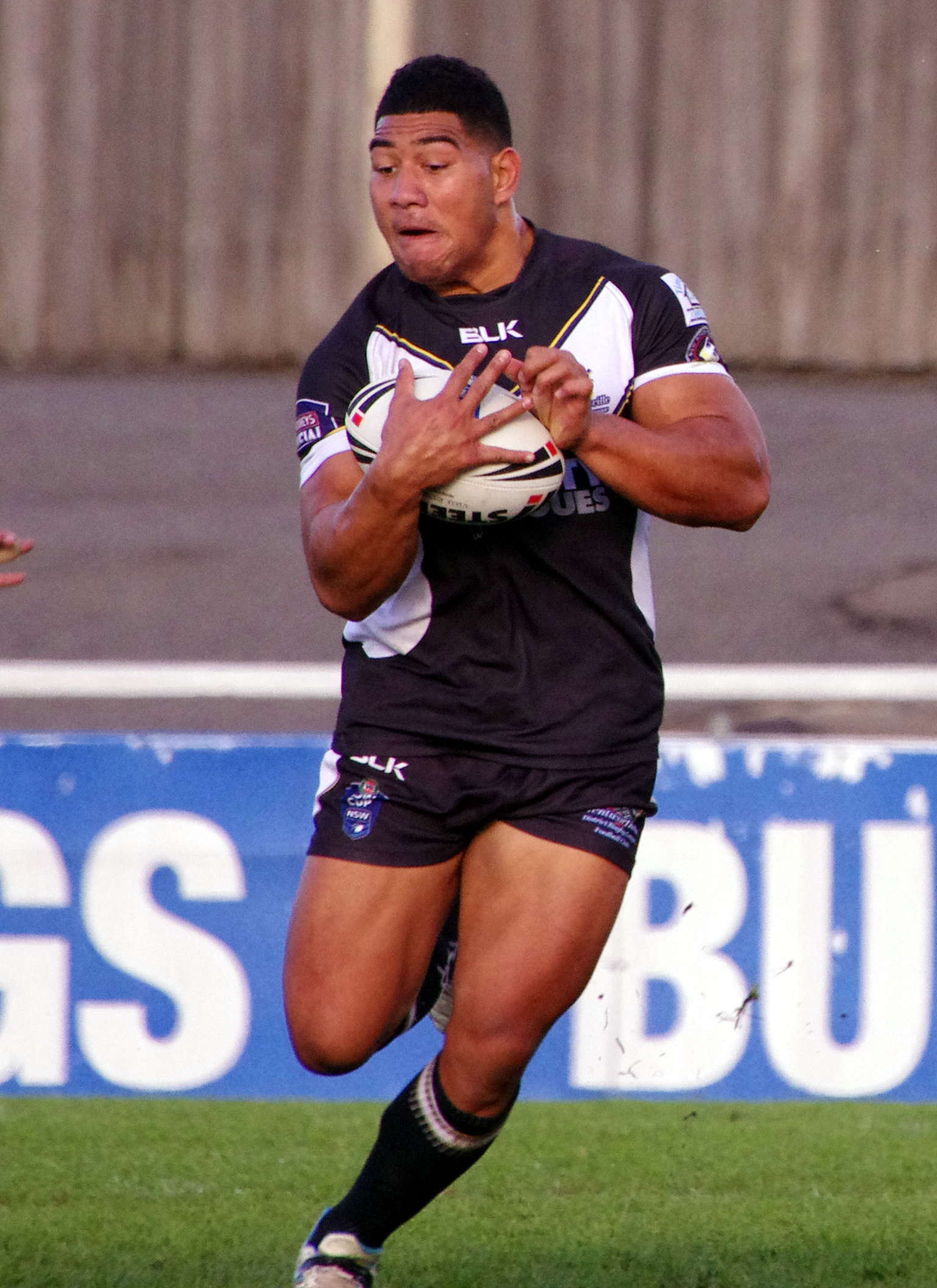
Tanginoa playing for the Wentworthville Magpies

=== 2014 ===
On 29 August 2014, Tanginoa was released from his Parramatta contract, signing a two-year contract with North Queensland, starting in 2015.

=== 2015 ===
In round 2 of the 2015 NRL season, Tanginoa made his debut for North Queensland, coming off the bench in the side's 14–16 loss to the Newcastle Knights.

On 27 September 2015, Tanginoa played in the Townsville Blackhawks' Intrust Super Cup Grand Final loss to the Ipswich Jets. Tanginoa was a member of the Cowboys' 2015 Premiership winning squad, though he did not take part in the Grand Final.

=== 2016 ===
On 21 October 2015, Tanginoa signed a one-year contract to return to the Parramatta Eels, after being released from the final year of his Cowboys contract. He would spend the season playing for the Wentworthville Magpies in the NSW Cup.

=== 2017 ===
Tanginoa spent the first half of 2017 with Wentworthville before Parramatta released him from his contract. He then signed to play for the Manly-Warringah Sea Eagles.

=== 2018 ===
Tanginoa made 12 appearances for Manly in 2018 as the club avoided the wooden spoon by just 2 competition points.

=== 2019 ===
Tanginoa joined Super League side Wakefield Trinity for the Super League XXIV season. He played 14 games for the club as they finished 9th on the table.

=== 2020 ===
Tanginoa at the end of the 2020 season, signed a new contract that would keep him at Wakefield Trinity until the end of the 2024 season.

=== 2021 ===
On 25 June 2021 he played for the Combined Nations All Stars in their 26–24 victory over England, staged at the Halliwell Jones Stadium, Warrington, as part of England's 2021 Rugby League World Cup preparation.

=== 2022 & 2023 ===
Tanginoa played 22 games for Wakefield Trinity in the 2022 Super League season which saw the side finish 10th. He was limited to only seven matches with Wakefield Trinity in the Super League XXVIII season as the club finished bottom of the table and were relegated to the RFL Championship which ended their 24-year stay in the top flight. After leaving Wakefield Trinity, he moved across the M62 to the city of Hull to join up with former teammates Corey Hall, James Batchelor, Yusuf Aydin, Jai Whitbread and George King ahead of the 2024 Super League season.

=== 2024 ===
Tanginoa made his club debut for Hull Kingston Rovers against arch-rivals Hull F.C. in round 1 of the 2024 Super League season. Tanginoa scored a try on debut as Hull Kingston Rovers won the derby 22–0. On 12 October 2024, Tanginoa played in Hull Kingston Rovers 2024 Super League Grand Final loss against Wigan.

=== 2025 ===
On 7 June, he played in Hull Kingston Rovers 8-6 Challenge Cup final victory over Warrington. It was the clubs first major trophy in 40 years.

On 28 November, he was announced as a signing for Warrington on a two-year deal.

=== 2026 ===
On 3 October, he played in the 2026 Super League Grand Final, which Warrington lost to Wakefield Trinity 23-10.

== Statistics ==
Statistics are correct to the end of the 2025 season

Season	Team	Matches	T	G	GK %	F/G	Pts
2013	Parramatta Eels	9	0	0	—	0	0
2014	Parramatta Eels	4	0	0	—	0	0
2015	North Queensland Cowboys	3	0	0	—	0	0
2017	Manly Warringah Sea Eagles	1	0	0	—	0	0
2018	Manly Warringah Sea Eagles	12	0	0	—	0	0
2019	Manly Warringah Sea Eagles	3	0	0	—	0	0
2019	Wakefield Trinity	15	1				4
2020	Wakefield Trinity	21	6				24
2021	Wakefield Trinity	22	6				24
2022	Wakefield Trinity	23	5				20
2023	Wakefield Trinity	7	3				12
2024	Hull Kingston Rovers	30	10				40
2025	Hull Kingston Rovers	29	6				24
2026	Warrington Wolves	8	4				
Career totals		179	37	0	—	0	120
