= Johnathan Thurston =

Australia international rugby league footballer (born 1983)

Johnathan Thurston AM
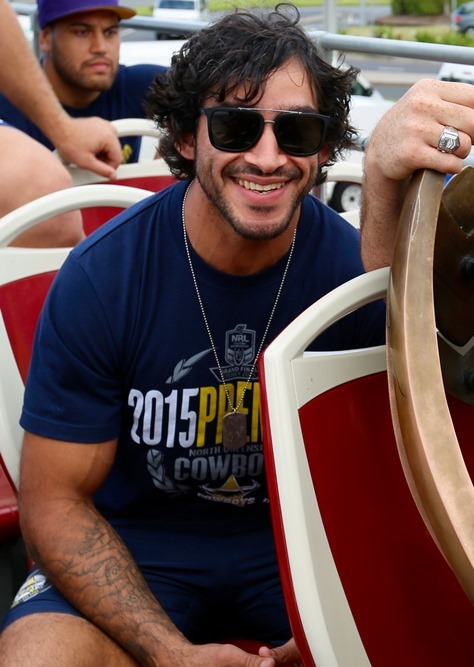

Personal information
- Full name: Johnathan Dean Thurston
- Born: 25 April 1983 (age 43) Brisbane, Queensland, Australia

Playing information
- Height: 179 cm (5 ft 10 1/2 in)
- Weight: 89 kg (14 st 0 lb)
- Position: Halfback, Five-eighth
Club
Years	Team	Pld	T	G	FG	P
2002–04	Canterbury Bulldogs	29	10	0	0	40
2005–18	North Qld Cowboys	294	80	923	16	2182
	Total	323	90	923	16	2222
Representative
Years	Team	Pld	T	G	FG	P
2005–17	Queensland	37	5	99	2	220
2006–17	Australia	38	13	165	0	382
2009	Prime Minister's XIII	1	0	7	0	14
2010–17	Indigenous All Stars	6	1	17	0	38

Johnathan Dean Thurston AM (born 25 April 1983) is an Australian former professional rugby league footballer who played in the National Rugby League (NRL). He is widely regarded as one of the greatest players in rugby league history and holds the record for the most Dally M Medals, having won the award four times (2005, 2007, 2014 and 2015). He also won the Golden Boot Award three times, recognising him as the world's best player in 2011, 2013 and 2015. An Australian international, Queensland State of Origin representative and Indigenous All Stars player, Thurston played primarily at halfback and Five-eighth, and was renowned for his playmaking, goal-kicking and leadership.

Thurston began his NRL career with the Canterbury-Bankstown Bulldogs, winning the 2004 NRL premiership before joining the North Queensland Cowboys in 2005. He helped lead the Cowboys to their first grand final appearance in 2005 and became the central figure in the club's subsequent rise to premiership success. In 2015, as co-captain alongside Matt Scott, he led North Queensland to its maiden NRL premiership. In the grand final against the Brisbane Broncos, Thurston kicked the winning field goal in golden point extra time to secure a 17–16 victory and was awarded the Clive Churchill Medal as the match's best player.

At representative level, Thurston played a key role in Queensland's eight consecutive State of Origin series victories from 2006 to 2013, appearing in every match of the winning streak. He made his Queensland debut in 2005 and played 36 consecutive State of Origin matches from his debut. In 2008, he was awarded the Wally Lewis Medal as player of the series. During the 2015 State of Origin series, Thurston became the highest point-scorer in State of Origin history, further cementing his standing as one of the competition's most accomplished players. His combination of individual accolades, representative success and decisive performances in major matches established him as one of the defining players of his era.

== Background ==
Thurston was born in Brisbane, Queensland, Australia, to a Gunggari (Indigenous Australian) mother and a New Zealand Māori father who also has English heritage.

He began playing rugby league at a very young age for Souths Sunnybank RLFC in Brisbane's southside. At 12, Thurston signed a scholarship deal with the South Queensland Crushers. Later during his youth he moved to Toowoomba where he attended St. Mary's College, playing rugby league and also a great success playing Rugby Union for the school and the Toowoomba Rugby League's All Whites club.

Although a stand-out player at school and club level at 18 years of age, none of the National Rugby League clubs were willing to sign the Queenslander with many citing his small size as a problem. According to Thurston's manager, Sam Ayoub, a number of the clubs were not even willing to take him for free. Only St George Illawarra Dragons coach Nathan Brown was willing to sign him because he was going to play for nothing. Ultimately, Ayoub negotiated with the Canterbury-Bankstown Bulldogs to sign him as he had promised Thurston's mother he would keep an eye on him, and Belmore (the Bulldogs' home ground) was closer to where he lived. The Bulldogs eventually signed Thurston in the 2001 NRL season for 'nil playing fee'. Once Thurston had the opportunity he was selected for the Queensland U-19 side that year.

== Playing career ==
=== Early Career (2002–2004) ===
Thurston made his NRL debut for the Canterbury Bulldogs in round 13 of the 2002 NRL season against the Penrith Panthers, coming off the interchange bench in the 38–24 win at Penrith Stadium. In round 21 against the North Queensland Cowboys, Thurston scored his first and second NRL career tries in Canterbury-Bankstown's 34–26 win at Dairy Farmers Stadium. Thurston scored 2 tries from 7 games in his debut season. As a specialist in the halves, Thurston was behind established Canterbury halves pairing Brent Sherwin and Braith Anasta and many of his critics still believed he was still too small in stature to be competitive in the NRL. Thurston was limited to 7 appearances for the 2002 season due to the Bulldogs' salary cap breach, as his payments for first-grade matches would have continued to breach the NRL's salary cap.

Thurston played in 15 matches and scored four tries in 2003.

Although Thurston never cemented a starting position and only took part in 29 matches throughout three seasons at Canterbury, in his final year in 2004, he was part of the Premiership-winning side, coming off the bench in the club's 16–13 win over the Sydney Roosters in the 2004 NRL Grand Final. Thurston wore jersey #18 for the match as he had been a late inclusion for regular captain Steve Price who, in the lead up to the match, was ruled out with a knee injury. As Price had initially housed and mentored him upon his arrival in Sydney, Thurston gave his premiership ring to Price as a thank you. Price was then able to give Thurston another ring in return. Towards the end of the season it was announced that 2004 would be his final year for the Sydney club as he was signed by the North Queensland Cowboys for 2005. Thurston played 7 matches and scored 4 tries for the year. At the end of the season, Thurston was approached by New Zealand but turned them down in favour of representing Australia and Queensland.

In 2015, it was revealed that Thurston had wanted to stay at Canterbury beyond the 2004 season but the management at the club had re-signed Sherwin and Anasta. According to Thurston's manager Sam Ayoub, the player had wanted to stay at Canterbury even if it had meant a diminished salary but had been told that leaving was the best option.

=== 2005 ===
In round 1 of the 2005 NRL season, Thurston made his club debut for North Queensland against the Brisbane Broncos at Suncorp Stadium at five-eighth in the club's 29–16 loss. In round 4, against the Newcastle Knights, Thurston scored his first club try for the Cowboys in the 52–18 win at Dairy Farmers Stadium. Thurston's return to Queensland proved to be a major turning point in his career. He became the starting halfback for the Cowboys, and his consistency earned him his first Queensland State of Origin jersey. In his debut match for Queensland in Game 1 of the 2005 State of Origin series at Suncorp Stadium, Thurston was voted Player's Player after being in the top 4 tacklers and kicking a field goal to force the game into extra time with Queensland eventually winning 24–20 after Cowboys teammate Matt Bowen scored an intercept try. In Game 3, Thurston scored a try in the Maroons 32–10 2005 State of Origin series loss at Suncorp Stadium. At club level Thurston was awarded the Halfback of the Year award and the prestigious Dally M Medal as the 2005 NRL season's Player of the Year, helping North Queensland to the 2005 NRL Grand Final, the first for the club. The Cowboys lost 30–16 to the Wests Tigers, ending Thurston's chance of winning two consecutive grand finals. Thurston played in 26 matches, scored 5 tries, kicked 28 goals and kicked 2 field goals in the 2005 NRL season. This was a start to a flourishing career.

=== 2006 ===
Thurston started the 2006 NRL season with a bang in Round 1 against the Brisbane Broncos; Thurston scored a hat trick of tries and kicked 6 goals in the Cowboys Queensland derby match 36–4 win at Suncorp Stadium. This was the start of a 6-match winning streak. Thurston was selected to make his international debut for Australia in the 2006 Anzac Test against New Zealand off the interchange bench in the Kangaroos 50–12 win at Suncorp Stadium. In the 2006 State of Origin series, Thurston was instrumental in Queensland's series win as the Maroons recovered from defeat in the first game to take the series 2–1. Thurston played in all 3 matches and kicked 7 goals. After the series, the Cowboys hit a mid-year slump and Thurston dislocated his knee in Round 20. The Cowboys suffered without Thurston and missed the finals coming at 9th place, Thurston finished the year with him playing in 17 matches, scoring 11 tries and kicking 49 goals. Thurston later recovered from his injury at the end of the regular NRL season and played for the Prime Minister's XIII before making the Australian squad for the Tri-Nations tournament. Thurston was chosen to play halfback for the first and second games against New Zealand where he was rewarded 'Man of Match' honours for the first game. Despite losing the jumper to Ben Hornby for the first game against Great Britain he returned for the second game against Great Britain and kept his place for the final against New Zealand. In this match, with the scores locked at 12–12 and the game into its 2nd half of golden point extra time, a Thurston break allowed him to set Darren Lockyer up for the 16–12 series-winning try for The Kangaroos finishing his year on a high note.

=== 2007 ===
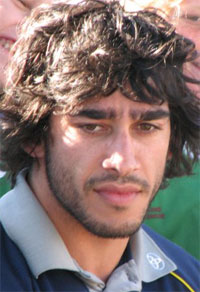
Thurston in 2007

As Thurston entered his third year with the Cowboys in the 2007 NRL season, he was appointed the Captain of the team following the retirement of Travis Norton. Thurston was again selected to play for the Australian national team at halfback in the 2007 Anzac Test match against New Zealand, kicking 5 goals from 6 attempts in the Kangaroos' 30–6 victory at Suncorp Stadium. In Game One of the 2007 State of Origin series, Thurston was named 'Man of the Match' for his performance in Queensland's 25–18 victory at Suncorp Stadium. Thurston led well as captain for the Cowboys and the team improved dramatically from the previous year to finish a strong third place on the ladder by the end of the regular season. Unfortunately they fell one game short of the club's second grand final appearance losing 28–6 to the second-placed Manly-Warringah Sea Eagles in what was otherwise a successful year. On 4 September 2007, Thurston won the Halfback of the Year and the Dally M Medal Player of the Year Award for the second time in three years, narrowly edging out Wests Tigers' Robbie Farah due to his strong performances in the final rounds of the regular season. Thurston played in 25 matches, scored 10 tries and kicked 78 goals for the Cowboys in the 2007 season.

=== 2008 ===
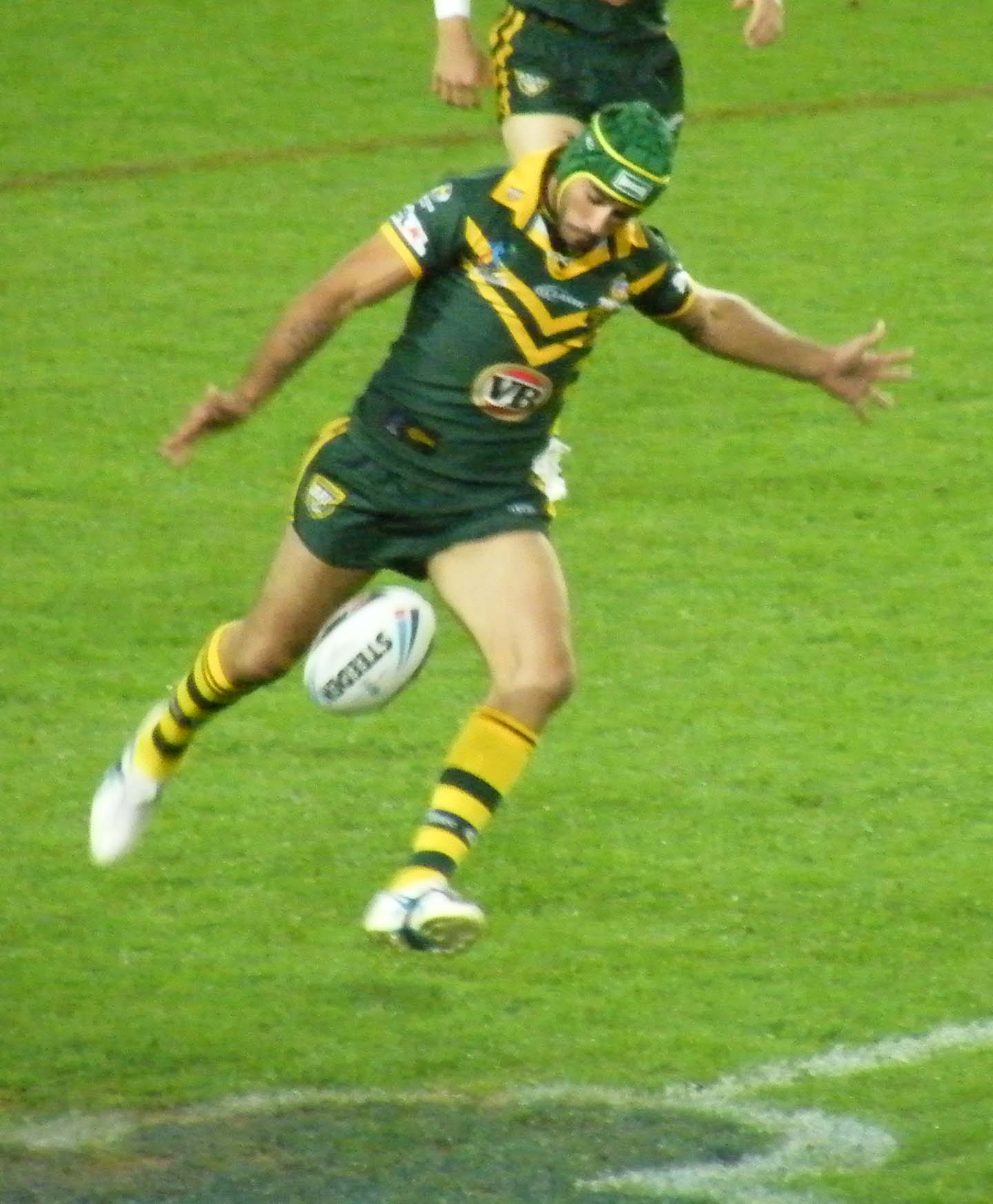
Thurston playing for Australia in the opening game of the 2008 World Cup against New Zealand. He was named man-of-the-match.

At the conclusion of the 2007 season it was reported Thurston would require major shoulder surgery due to ongoing physical damage to his ligaments. He underwent two shoulder reconstructions. Thurston was supposed to make a return for the Cowboys in Round 5 of the 2008 NRL season following his off-season surgery, but made a surprise return in Round 1 against the Gold Coast Titans, scoring 2 tries in the Cowboys 36–18 loss at the Titans first match at their home ground of Robina Stadium. In Round 3 against the Brisbane Broncos, Thurston played his 100th NRL match in the Cowboys 36–2 loss at Suncorp Stadium. Thurston was selected at halfback in the Australian team for the Centenary Test against New Zealand, Thurston kicked 4 goals in the Kangaroos 28–12 win at the SCG. In the deciding match of the 2008 State of Origin series in game three, Thurston set up a try for Billy Slater which would ultimately win the game and the series for Queensland 16–10 at ANZ Stadium. Thurston was also named the Wally Lewis Player of the Series. Thurston would not replicate the previous year's successes in 2008, as the Cowboys seemed to lose all of their exciting spark that saw them renovate the club's reputation in recent years. Three wins at the start of the year held promise, but after a record-breaking 15-match losing streak, all hope faded. Thurston played 17 matches, scored 4 tries and kicked 39 goals for the Cowboys in the 2008 NRL season. In August 2008, Thurston was named in the Australia training squad for the 2008 Rugby League World Cup. On 7 October 2008, Thurston was confirmed in the final 24-man Australian squad. In Australia's first match of the tournament Thurston, despite mourning the murder of his uncle in a Brisbane park less than 38 hours prior, put in a strong performance to be named man-of-the-match in the Kangaroos 30–6 win over the Kiwis at the Sydney Football Stadium. In the 2008 Rugby League World Cup final against New Zealand, Thurston played at halfback and kicked 2 goals in the 34–20 loss at Suncorp Stadium.

=== 2009 ===
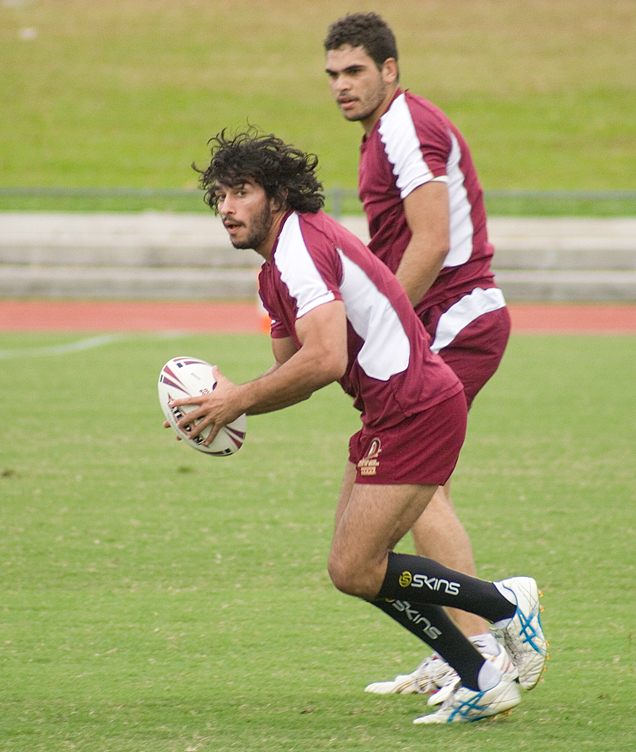
Thurston (front) and Greg Inglis training with Queensland in 2009

Thurston was selected in the 2009 Anzac Test for Australia against New Zealand at halfback, scoring 2 tries and kicking 5 goals in the Kangaroos 38–10 win at Suncorp Stadium. In April 2009, Thurston was named in the preliminary 25 man squad to represent Queensland in the 2009 State of Origin series' opening match and was subsequently picked at halfback for all three matches. In Game Two at ANZ Stadium, Thurston helped Queensland win 24–14, making history as the first side to win four consecutive series. Thurston played in the third match as well, which Queensland lost 28–16 at Suncorp Stadium. In Round 17 against the Cronulla-Sutherland Sharks, Thurston played his 100th club match for the Cowboys in the 24–4 win at Dairy Farmers Stadium. This year also saw Thurston the front runner for his third Dally M 'Player of the Year' Award, only to be surpassed in the points tally by a late season run by Jarryd Hayne from the Parramatta Eels. Although missing out marginally on the top accolade Thurston had still maintained enough points to be named 'Halfback of the Year'. Thurston played in 23 matches, scored 11 tries and kicked 79 goals for the Cowboys in the 2009 NRL season. After the NRL season had ended, Thurston kicked seven goals from as many attempts as the Prime Minister's team defeated Papua New Guinea 42–18 in Port Moresby. Thurston travelled with the Australian national team to Europe for the 2009 Rugby League Four Nations tournament. In the Four Nations final match against England, Thurston was awarded was man-of-the-match in the Kangaroos 46–16 victory at Elland Road. Thurston was the tournament's top point-scorer with 36 points from a try and 17 goals.

=== 2010 ===
On 13 February 2010, Thurston was selected for the inaugural Indigenous All Stars team against the NRL All Stars at halfback, kicking 2 goals and was named the Preston Campbell Medal man-of-the-match in the 16–12 win at Cbus Super Stadium. A shoulder injury in Round 5 against the Wests Tigers in the Cowboys 23–16 loss at Dairy Farmers Stadium made Thurston sidelined for the 2010 Anzac Test. In Game 1 of the 2010 State of Origin series, Thurston was named man-of-the-match in Queensland's 28–24 victory, giving him a total of three Origin man-of-the-match awards. Thurston's great individual performance made headlines referring to him as being Queensland's Greatest Halfback and with ex-players from both sides of the border making comments on his performance rivalling that of Andrew Johns in 2005. During a match in Round 12 against Manly-Warringah Sea Eagles, Thurston was found guilty of swearing at the referee 8 times in regards to a forward pass decision against the Cowboys which aided in Manly winning 24–20. In Round 18 against the Parramatta Eels, Thurston played his 150th NRL career match in the Cowboys 36–24 loss at Parramatta Stadium. Thurston finished the 2010 NRL season with him playing in 17 matches, scoring 2 tries, kicking 43 goals and kicking 1 field goal for the Cowboys. Thurston missed the 2010 Rugby League Four Nations series due to an ankle injury.

=== 2011 ===
On 12 February 2011, Thurston was again selected for the Indigenous All Stars team for the NRL All Stars match at Cbus Super Stadium, playing at halfback in the 28–12 loss. In the 2011 Anzac Test against New Zealand, Thurston played at halfback and kicked 2 goals in Australia's 20–10 victory at Cbus Super Stadium. In Game 3 of the 2011 State of Origin series, Thurston suffered what at first appeared to be a horrific anterior cruciate ligament (ACL) knee injury, in the second half of the 34–24 series win at Suncorp Stadium. Thurston, who had to be driven off the field on the Medi-Cab initially feared he would be out for the rest of the season, however early prognosis claimed that with immediate surgery, he could be back by Round 25, and in time for a possible Cowboys finals appearance. At the time of his injury, Thurston was leading the Dally M Medal ladder by two clear man-of-the-match performances (six points ahead of nearest rival Kieran Foran). After having scans the following day it was discovered that Thurston would miss 5–6 weeks and would have to wear a leg brace after the scans showed he had suffered a grade two medial ligament damage but would not require surgery. This was the 21st consecutive Origin match played by Thurston since his debut in Game I 2005, breaking one of his teammates' records in Cameron Smith who played 19 consecutive Origins from his debut in Game III 2003. Thurston later returned for the Cowboys in Round 23 against the Brisbane Broncos at Dairy Farmers Stadium, The Cowboys were defeated 34–16 in Broncos legend Darren Lockyer’s record breaking 350th career match. The Cowboys made the finals finishing 7th on the ladder before getting destroyed by the Manly-Warringah Sea Eagles in the second half in the 42–8 loss after leading 8–0 at half time at the Sydney Football Stadium. Thurston played in 19 matches, scored 10 tries and kicked 61 goals for the Cowboys in the 2011 NRL season. In the post-season, Thurston travelled with the Australian national team to England for the 2011 Four Nations tournament, where he starred in all four games for Australia. Thurston picked up man of the match honours on three occasions whilst in the U.K, including the final in which Australia won 30–8 at Elland Road. Thurston tallied 52 points during the tournament, scoring 3 tries and converting 22 goals from 25 attempts. Thurston was rewarded for a fantastic 2011 season with the Golden Boot Award.

=== 2012 ===
In Round 6 against the Melbourne Storm, Thurston played his 150th NRL career club match for the Cowboys in the 42–18 loss at Dairy Farmers Stadium. In the 2012 Anzac Test against New Zealand, Thurston played at five-eighth, scored a try, kicked four goals from four attempts and was named man-of-the-match in the Kangaroos 20–12 win at Eden Park. Thurston helped Queensland to win a 7th consecutive Origin series win, 2–1 in the 2012 State of Origin series. Thurston played 24 matches, scored 3 tries, kicked 90 goals and kicked 1 field goal for the Cowboys in the 2012 NRL season. At the 2012 Dally M Awards Thurston was named the NRL's five-eighth of the year. On 13 October 2012, Thurston played in the one off October Trans-Tasman test at 1300SMILES Stadium, kicking 3 goals in the 18–10 win over the New Zealand Kiwis.

=== 2013 ===
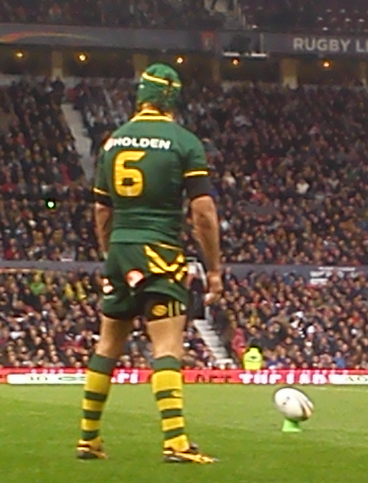
Thurston at Old Trafford during the 2013 RLWC Final

On 11 March 2013, Thurston signed the richest deal in rugby league's history, ensuring he would stay at the North Queensland Cowboys. North Queensland announced a staggering four-year $5 million contract to retain the Queensland Maroons and Australia Kangaroos star half at the club. It was later revealed he was very close to leaving the Cowboys and signing with the Penrith Panthers, but chose to remain in Townsville for the birth of his first child. In Round 3 against the Newcastle Knights, Thurston played his 200th NRL career match in the Cowboys 34–6 loss at Hunter Stadium. In the 2013 Anzac Test against New Zealand, Thurston played for Australia at five-eighth in the 32–12 victory at Canberra Stadium. Thurston was Queensland's five-eighth in the 2013 State of Origin series, in whose third and deciding game he scored a try and kicked two goals in the 12–10 win at ANZ Stadium, helping the Maroons extend their record to eight consecutive series victories.

Thurston also led the Cowboys alongside Matt Bowen and Brent Tate to the 2013 finals with a run of 6 consecutive wins. However the Cowboys were knocked out in the first week in a controversial match against the Cronulla-Sutherland Sharks at the Sydney Football Stadium. In this match, a seventh tackle try was awarded to Sharks player Beau Ryan, making the end result 20–18. In a later interview, Thurston then claimed there was a conspiracy in the NRL that they wanted an all Sydney grand final. Thurston played in 22 matches, scored 2 tries, kicked 71 goals and kicked 1 field goal for the Cowboys in the 2013 NRL season. In the post-season, Thurston joined the Australian squad that travelled to Europe for the 2013 Rugby League World Cup. In the World Cup final against New Zealand, Thurston was named the man-of-the-match, his fourth such award of the tournament in the Kangaroos 34–2 win at Old Trafford. Thurston also broke the 31-year-old record of Mick Cronin, passing the record of 309 test points for the Kangaroos. Thurston played in five matches, scored two tries, and kicked 33 goals in the tournament.

=== 2014 ===
On 17 January 2014 Thurston was announced as 2013's Golden Boot Award winner following his prominence in Australia's World Cup and Queensland's State of Origin successes. It was his second Golden Boot in three years. Thurston played in the 2014 Anzac Test at five-eighth, kicking 5 goals in a man-of-the-match performance in Australia's 30–18 victory at the Sydney Football Stadium. In Round 10 against the Sydney Roosters, Thurston played his 200th club match for the Cowboys, scoring a try and kicking 7 goals in the 42–10 win at 1300SMILES Stadium. Thurston went on to play five-eighth for Queensland in the 2014 State of Origin series. Despite Queensland losing both Game 1 at home and Game 2 away in Sydney as well as the 2014 Origin Series, Thurston broke Mal Meninga's record of 161 points as 'Top Point-Scorer in State of Origin' when he kicked his 2nd penalty goal in the 1st half of Game 2 in the Maroons 6–4 loss. In Game 3, Thurston retained his position at five-eighth kicking all 6 goals in Queensland's 32–8 win over New South Wales at Suncorp Stadium. Following the 2014 State of Origin Series, Thurston switched from five-eighth to halfback in Round 19 against the Cronulla-Sutherland Sharks in the Cowboys 36–18 win at Remondis Stadium. Thurston continued playing at halfback throughout the back end of the season, up to the Cowboys Finals Week 2 controversial match against the Sydney Roosters at the Sydney Football Stadium. Thurston inspired the Cowboys to comeback from 30–0 down after 34 minutes to even at 30–30 after 56 minutes, scoring the Cowboys third try in the comeback. After the Roosters five-eighth James Maloney kicked a field goal to give the Roosters a 31–30 lead at the 75th minute, Thurston scored a try that was disallowed by the video referee after the ball came forward off the arm of Cowboys five-eighth Robert Lui when winger Kyle Feldt threw an offload to him. The Cowboys lost the match 31–30, meaning the Cowboys season ended controversially for the third year in a row. The switch to halfback following the Origin series, Thurston produced a lot of great and strong playing performances every week until their elimination from the finals, winning 8 from 10 games while playing in the halfback position. Thurston finished off the 2014 NRL season with him playing in 24 matches, scoring 11 tries, kicking 93 goals and kicking 4 field goals for the Cowboys. On 29 September 2014, at the 2014 Dally M Awards, Thurston and Parramatta Eels captain Jarryd Hayne were the joint winners of the 2014 Dally M Player of the Year Award. For Thurston, it was his third Dally M Player of the Year award following his win in 2007 and he was also a multiple award winner on the night, also claiming the Five-eighth of the Year and the Provan-Summons Medal awards. Thurston was ruled out of Australia's 2014 Four Nations campaign due to a shoulder injury.

=== 2015 ===
On 13 February 2015, Thurston was selected to play at halfback for the Indigenous All Stars in the 2015 All Stars match at Cbus Super Stadium. The Indigenous side won 20–6 over the NRL All Stars. After beginning the season with 3 straight losses, many doubted the premiership credentials of the North Queensland Cowboys in 2015. However, after snatching victory in a dramatic round 4 win over the Melbourne Storm, the Cowboys began their club record 11 game winning streak, with Thurston winning multiple Man of the Match awards in the process. For the 2015 Anzac Test, Thurston was selected at five-eighth for Australia against New Zealand, kicking 2 goals in the Kangaroos 26–12 loss at Suncorp Stadium. Thurston played in all 3 matches of Queensland's 2–1 2015 State of Origin series win. On 28 September 2015, at the 2015 Dally M Awards, Thurston won the 2015 Dally M Player of the Year by a record margin of 11 points. In addition, he was also awarded 2015 Dally M Halfback of the Year and, along with Cowboys co-captain Matthew Scott, the Dally M Captain of the Year. On 4 October 2015, at the 2015 NRL Grand Final against Queensland rivals the Brisbane Broncos, after North Queensland Cowboy's winger Kyle Feldt scored an 80th minute try to tie the game. Thurston then missed the conversion to win the premiership, resulting in golden point extra time. North Queensland won the toss, electing to kick, and following a knock on by Ben Hunt from the kick-off, Thurston kicked a field goal in the 82nd minute, securing the North Queensland Cowboys' first ever premiership. Thurston was named the Clive Churchill Medal man-of-the-match in the Cowboys 17–16 win. Thurston finished his brilliant 2015 NRL season with him playing in 24 matches, scoring 4 tries, kicking 93 goals and kicking 6 field goals for the Cowboys. On 20 November, Thurston won the Golden Boot Award for the third time. On 15 December 2015, Thurston was named at halfback and captain for the Indigenous All Stars team to play against the new World All Stars team on 13 February 2016.

=== 2016 ===
On 22 February 2016, Thurston was part of the North Queensland side that competed in the 2016 World Club Challenge against Super League champions Leeds, starting at halfback, scoring a try and kicked 5 goals in the Cowboys' 36–4 victory and he was named the man of the match, being awarded the Graham Murray Medal. In Round 7, Thurston scored his 1000th point at 1300SMILES Stadium when he kicked a conversion against the South Sydney Rabbitohs as Cowboys went on to blow out the Rabbitohs in a 44–18 victory. On 6 May 2016, Thurston played for Australia against New Zealand, playing at five-eighth and kicking a goal in the 16–0 win at Hunter Stadium. In Round 11 against Queensland rivals the Brisbane Broncos, Thurston played his 250th club career match for the North Queensland Cowboys in front of a home crowd at 1300SMILES Stadium, where he kicked the winning field goal with 5 minutes remaining to achieve victory for the Cowboys, 19–18. He received man of the match honours at Full-Time. Thurston later in 2016 announced that he is likely to retire at the end of the 2018 season.

At the 2016 Dally M Awards, Thurston was nominated for four awards including; Captain of the Year, Representative of the Year, Halfback of the Year and Provan Summons Medalist. Thurston also finished equal second in the Dally M Player of the Year voting with 22 points.

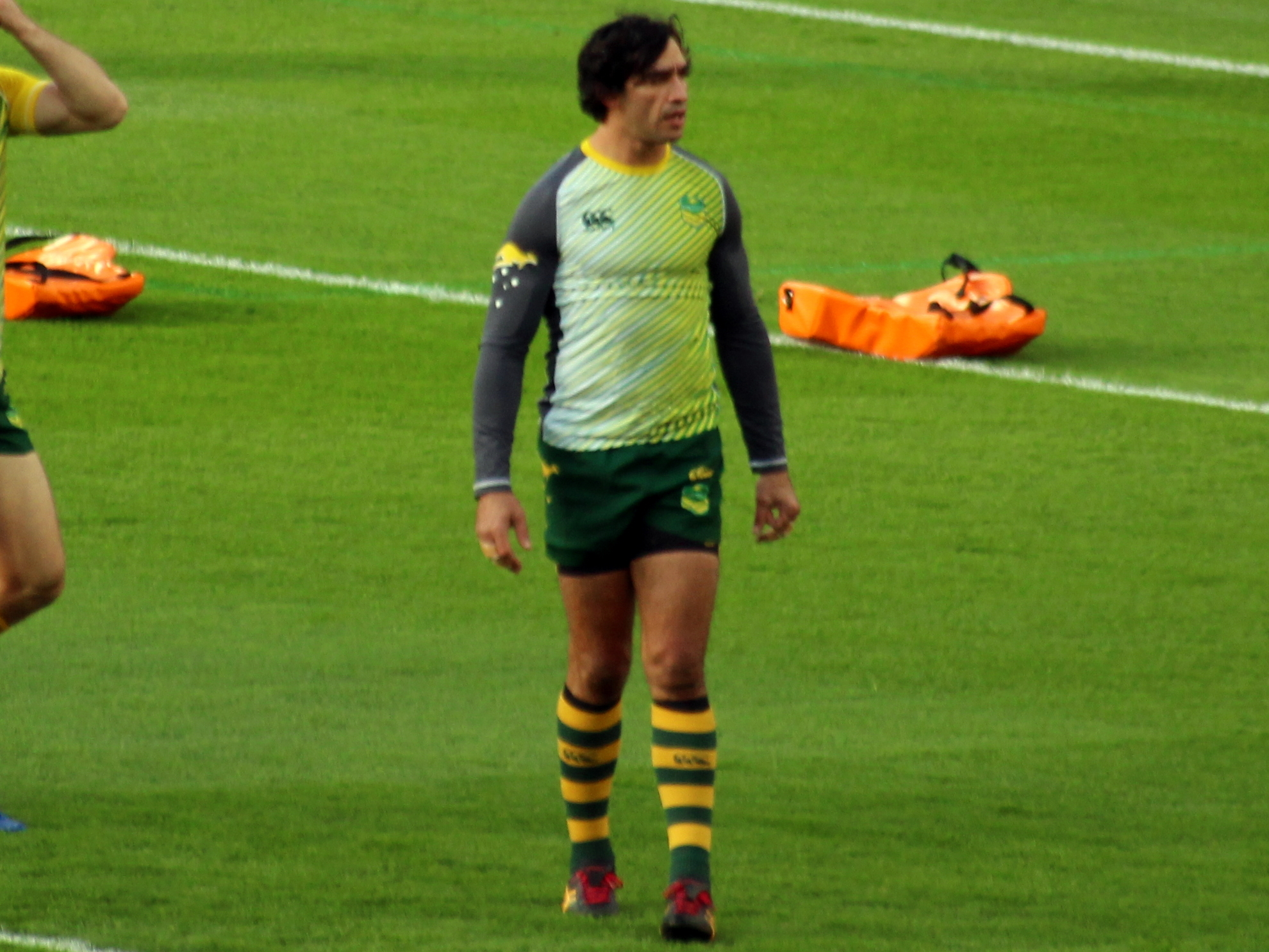
Thurston warming up for the Kangaroos in London in 2016

Thurston was named in the Australian Kangaroos test squad of 24 for the 2016 Four Nations tournament a week after the 2016 NRL Grand Final. Thurston played in the warmup match against New Zealand in Perth on 15 October in a 26–6 victory.

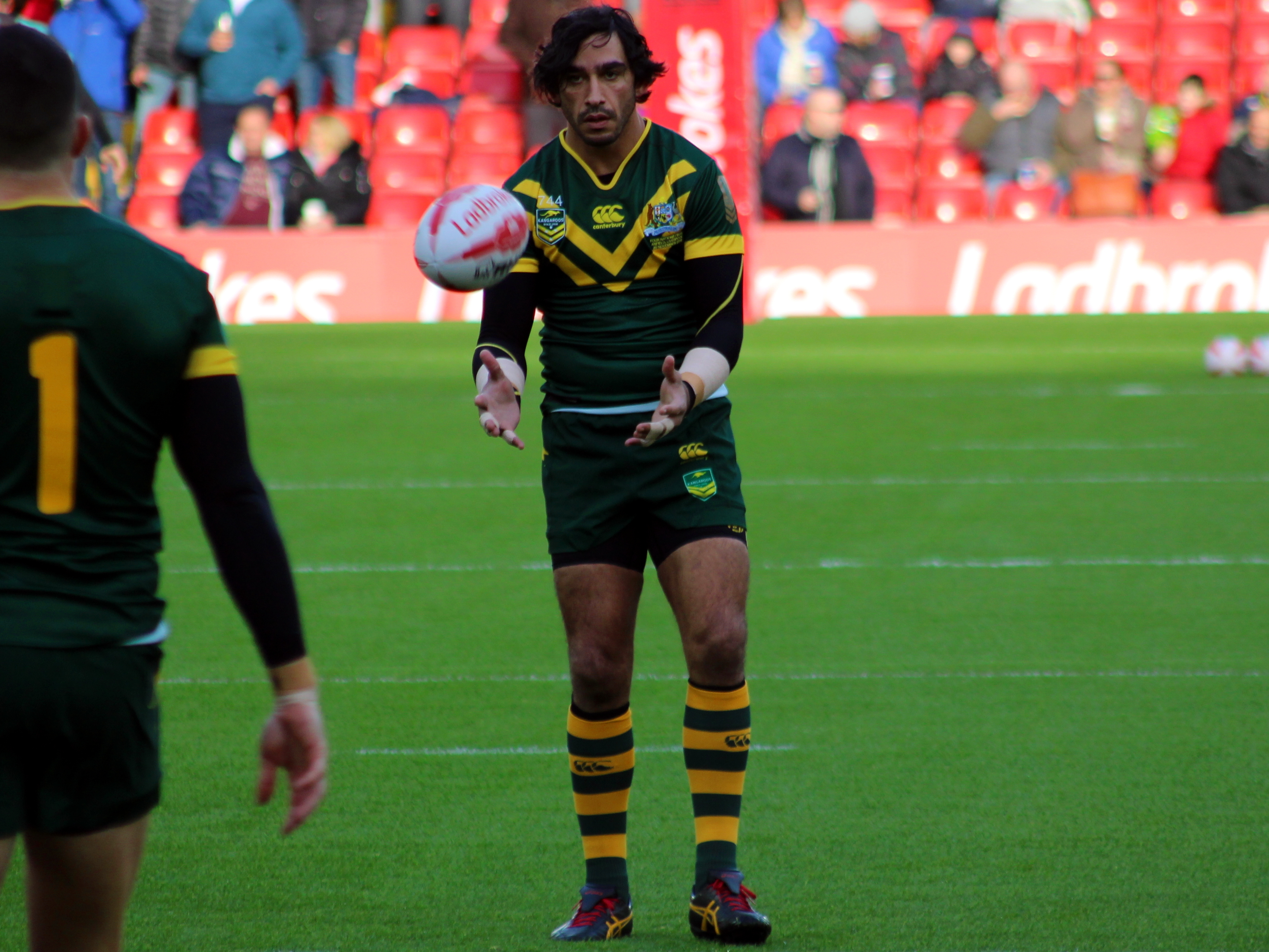
Thurston warming up for Australia at Anfield in 2016

In the Four Nations final in which Australia won 34–8 against New Zealand, Thurston played a central figure in the win, starting the game at five-eighth and kicking five goals. Thurston ended the series as the highest point scorer with 32 points from his three games.

=== 2017 ===
Thurston had been nagged by injury troubles all through 2017. In round 6 of the 2017 NRL season, he suffered a calf injury during the Cowboys' 16–26 loss to the Tigers. He recovered from that injury in-time to play in the 2017 ANZAC Test for Australia. During the Test match, he picked up a shoulder injury which kept him out of action for 8 weeks. He failed to recover in-time for State of Origin game 1; but he returned from injury in round 14, in the Cowboys 32–6 win over the Eels.

At first it was speculated that he wouldn't be ready by game 2 but was surprisingly named in the lineup for the second game after game 1 was won by New South Wales. Queensland won game 2 in a close one with Thurston injuring his shoulder but scoring the winning points by kicking a goal to convert a late try. Following Queensland's game 2 victory; it was revealed that Thurston picked up a season-ending shoulder injury ruling him out for the remainder of the 2017 NRL season, including the round 14 game (which would have been his 300th NRL First Grade Games milestone), game 3 of the 2017 State of Origin Series (which would have been his final Origin game), The Cowboys' grand final defeat by the Melbourne Storm and the World Cup.

Following Queensland's 22–6 win over New South Wales in Game 3 of the 2017 State of Origin Series, captain Cameron Smith invited Thurston to lift the Origin Shield with him in Thurston's send-off from State of Origin competition.

=== 2018 ===
Thurston returned to the Cowboys at the beginning of the new season, finally playing his 300th match in Round 1 against the Cronulla-Sutherland Sharks after missing the back end of the 2017 season. Given their Grand Final appearance in 2017 and Thurston's retirement from representative football, the Cowboys were tipped to have another tilt at the finals and potentially another Grand Final, however they fell well short, finishing 13th overall & failing to qualify for the finals.

Thurston played his final game against the Gold Coast Titans, producing a masterclass in a tightly contested game that the Cowboys eventually won 30–26.

== Post playing ==
In 2018, Thurston retired from playing rugby league, and founded and launched the Johnathan Thurston Academy (JTAcademy) of which is he now the Managing Director. The JTAcademy provides a forum which encourages Australian youths to access the educational and vocational resources needed to secure meaningful employment.

In August 2024, the National Rugby League announced that Thurston was an inductee into the National Rugby League Hall of Fame. Thurston, who was ascribed Hall of Fame number 121, was amongst eleven male players in the 2024 Class.

In April 2025, Thurston was involved in a heated verbal altercation with Sydney Roosters forward Spencer Leniu in where Leniu swore at the ex NRL player turned commentator after the Roosters round six match against the Broncos. Leniu has since stated that he didn't want to speak with Thurston after the match and he was approached twice by Thurston.

On 18 February 2026, the Cowboys announced that Thurston had been added to the Cowboys board as a member.

== Achievements and accolades ==
=== Individual ===
- Please note: Due to the vast amount of accolades won by Thurston, this is just a summary of his major award wins.

Dally M Medal Player of the Year: 2005, 2007, 2014, 2015
Dally M Halfback of the Year: 2005, 2007, 2009, 2015
Dally M Five-Eighth of the Year: 2012, 2013, 2014
Dally M Captain of the Year: 2015
RLPA Player of the Year 2005, 2013, 2014, 2015
RLPA Halfback of the Year 2018
RLPA Indigenous Leadership & Excellence 2018
RLIF International Back of the Year: 2007
RLIF Halfback of the Year: 2009, 2011, 2015
Rugby League World Golden Boot Award: 2011, 2013, 2015
Rugby League Week Player of the Year: 2007
Indigenous Halfback of the century (1908–2007)
North Queensland Cowboys Player of the Year: 2005, 2012, 2014, 2015
North Queensland Cowboys Players' player of the Year: 2011, 2014
Provan-Summons Medal:^{1} 2014, 2015
Clive Churchill Medal:^{2} 2015
Alan Clarkson Trophy:^{3} 2015
Graham Murray Medal:^{4} 2016
Arthur Beetson Medal: 2017
Wally Lewis Medal:^{5} 2008
Ron McAuliffe Medal:^{6} 2012
Preston Campbell Medal:^{7} 2010, 2017
Ken Stephen Medal:^{8} 2012
Australian Representative Player of the Year: 2014
Rugby League World Cup (2013) 4 Man of the Match awards; in the 4 games he played
State of Origin Man of the Match: 5 Awards
State of Origin most consecutive matches: 36 (2005–2016)
State of Origin all-time highest point scorer.
All time highest point scorer in Australian test player Townsville Bulletin Fan Choice Award: 2014, 2015

1.The Provan-Summons Medal was awarded to the "people's choice" NRL player of the year that is fan voted.
2.The Clive Churchill Medal was awarded to the player judged man of the match in the NRL Grand Final.
3.The Alan Clarkson Trophy was awarded to the player judged most valuable finals player in the world.
4.The Graham Murray Medal was awarded to the player judged man of the match in the 2016 World Club Challenge.
5.The Wally Lewis Medal was awarded to the State of Origin player of the series.
6.The Ron McAuliffe Medal was awarded to the Queensland State of Origin player of the series.
7.The Preston Campbell Medal was awarded to the player judged man of the match in the Rugby League All Stars Match.
8.The Ken Stephen Medal was awarded to the player who has achieved both on and off the field through community projects.

In 2014, Thurston was made a life member of the North Queensland Cowboys.

In 2015 and 2018, Thurston was named Philips Sports Dad of the Year.

In 2015, Thurston was named as Big League Magazines Player of the Year, he was also named at Halfback in the magazines team of the year section.

In 2015, Thurston was presented the Channel 9 Wide World of Sports Golden Kenny trophy for Australian sports star of the year.

In 2015, Thurston was awarded an honorary Doctor of Letters from James Cook University for his "outstanding service and exceptional contributions to the northern Queensland community."

In the 2019 Queen's Birthday Honours, Thurston was made a Member of the Order of Australia, for significant service to rugby league, and as a role model.

In 2023, he was inducted into the Sport Australia Hall of Fame.

=== Team ===
NRL Grand Finals
Year	Team	Opposition	Venue	Score	Result
2004	Canterbury-Bankstown	Sydney	Telstra Stadium	16–13	Win
2005	North Queensland	Wests Tigers	Telstra Stadium	16–30	Runners-up
2015	North Queensland	Brisbane	ANZ Stadium	17–16	Win

World Club Challenge
Year	Team	Opposition	Venue	Score	Result
2016	North Queensland	Leeds	Headingley Rugby Stadium	38–4	Win

Rugby League World Cup finals
Year	Team	Opposition	Venue	Score	Result
2008	Australia	New Zealand	Suncorp Stadium	20–34	Runners-up
2013	Australia	New Zealand	Old Trafford	34–2	Win

=== Records ===
Most Dally M Medals: 4 (2005, 2007, 2014, 2015)
Most Golden Boot Awards: 3 (2011, 2013, 2015)
Most RLPA Players' Player Medals: 4 (2005, 2013, 2014, 2015)
Most career points for the Australian test team: 334 (2006–2017)
Most career goals for the Australian test team: 143 (2006–2017)
Most consecutive games in State of Origin: 36 (2005–2017)
Most career points in State of Origin: 224 (2005–2017)
Most career goals in State of Origin: 101 (2005–2017)
Most North Queensland Cowboys Player of the Year Awards: 4 (2005, 2012, 2014, 2015)

== Statistics ==
=== NRL ===
Statistics are correct to the end of the 2018 season

†	Denotes seasons in which Thurston won an NRL Premiership

Season	Team	Matches	T	G	GK %	F/G	Pts	W	L	D	W-L %
2002	Canterbury-Bankstown	7	2	0	—	0	8	5	2	0	71.4
2003	Canterbury-Bankstown	15	4	0	—	0	16	9	6	0	60.0
2004†	Canterbury-Bankstown	7	4	0	0.0	0	16	6	1	0	85.7
2005	North Queensland	26	5	28	77.8	2	78	15	11	0	57.7
2006	North Queensland	17	11	49	77.8	0	142	9	8	0	52.9
2007	North Queensland	25	10	78	80.4	0	196	17	8	0	68.0
2008	North Queensland	17	4	39	78.0	0	94	4	13	0	23.5
2009	North Queensland	23	11	79	79.8	0	202	10	13	0	43.5
2010	North Queensland	17	2	43	86.0	1	95	3	14	0	17.6
2011	North Queensland	19	10	61	77.2	0	162	11	8	0	57.9
2012	North Queensland	24	3	90	82.6	0	192	15	9	0	62.5
2013	North Queensland	22	2	71	75.5	1	151	12	10	0	54.5
2014	North Queensland	24	11	93	76.9	4	234	15	9	0	62.5
2015†	North Queensland	25	4	93	78.1	6	208	18	7	0	72.0
2016	North Queensland	24	2	96	84.2	1	201	16	8	0	66.7
2017	North Queensland	7	2	26	83.9	1	61	5	2	0	71.4
2018	North Queensland	24	3	77	77.8	0	166	8	16	0	33.3
Career totals		323	90	923	79.46	16	2222	178	145	0	55.1

=== All Star ===
†	Denotes years in which Thurston won an All Stars Match

Season	Team	Matches	T	G	GK %	F/G	Pts	W	L	D	W-L %
2010†	Indigenous All Stars	1	0	2	100	0	4	1	0	0	100
2011	Indigenous All Stars	1	0	1	100	0	2	0	1	0	0
2012	Indigenous All Stars	1	0	3	75	0	6	0	1	0	0
2013†	Indigenous All Stars	1	0	3	75	0	6	1	0	0	100
2015†	Indigenous All Stars	1	0	4	100	0	8	1	0	0	100
2017†	Indigenous All Stars	1	1	4	80	0	12	1	0	0	100
Career totals		6	1	17	88.3	0	38	4	2	0	66.6

=== State of Origin ===
†	Denotes years in which Thurston won a State of Origin series

Season	Team	Matches	T	G	GK %	F/G	Pts	W	L	D	W-L %
2005	Queensland	3	1	0	—	1	5	1	2	0	33.3
2006†	Queensland	3	0	7	77.8	0	14	2	1	0	66.7
2007†	Queensland	3	0	5	71.4	1	11	2	1	0	66.7
2008†	Queensland	3	0	10	76.9	0	20	2	1	0	66.7
2009†	Queensland	3	1	10	83.3	0	24	2	1	0	66.7
2010†	Queensland	3	0	12	85.7	0	24	3	0	0	100
2011†	Queensland	3	1	8	80.0	0	16	2	1	0	66.7
2012†	Queensland	3	1	9	90.0	0	22	2	1	0	66.7
2013†	Queensland	3	1	7	77.8	0	18	2	1	0	66.7
2014	Queensland	3	0	8	80.0	0	16	1	2	0	33.3
2015†	Queensland	3	0	13	81.3	0	26	2	1	0	66.7
2016†	Queensland	3	0	7	63.7	0	14	2	1	0	66.7
2017†	Queensland	1	0	3	100	0	6	1	0	0	100
Career totals		37	5	99	80	2	220	24	13	0	66.68

=== International ===
†	Denotes years in which Thurston won a World Cup

Season	Team	Matches	T	G	GK %	F/G	Pts	W	L	D	W-L %
2006	Australia	5	0	17	85.00	0	34	5	0	0	100
2007	Australia	1	0	5	83.3	0	10	1	0	0	100
2008	Australia	5	3	23	71.9	0	58	4	1	0	80.0
2009	Australia	5	3	22	73.3	0	56	4	0	1	80.0
2010	Australia	0	—	—	—	—	—	—	—	—	—
2011	Australia	6	3	28	77.8	0	68	6	0	0	100
2012	Australia	2	1	7	87.5	0	18	2	0	0	100
2013†	Australia	6	2	33	78.6	0	74	6	0	0	100
2014	Australia	1	0	5	100	0	10	1	0	0	100
2015	Australia	1	0	2	100	0	4	0	1	0	0
2016	Australia	5	1	18	66.7	0	40	5	0	0	100
2017	Australia	1	0	3	60	0	6	1	0	0	100
Career totals		38	13	168	78.2	0	388	36	2	1	92.31

== Personal life ==
Thurston was a finalist in Cleo magazine's Most Eligible Bachelors for 2006.

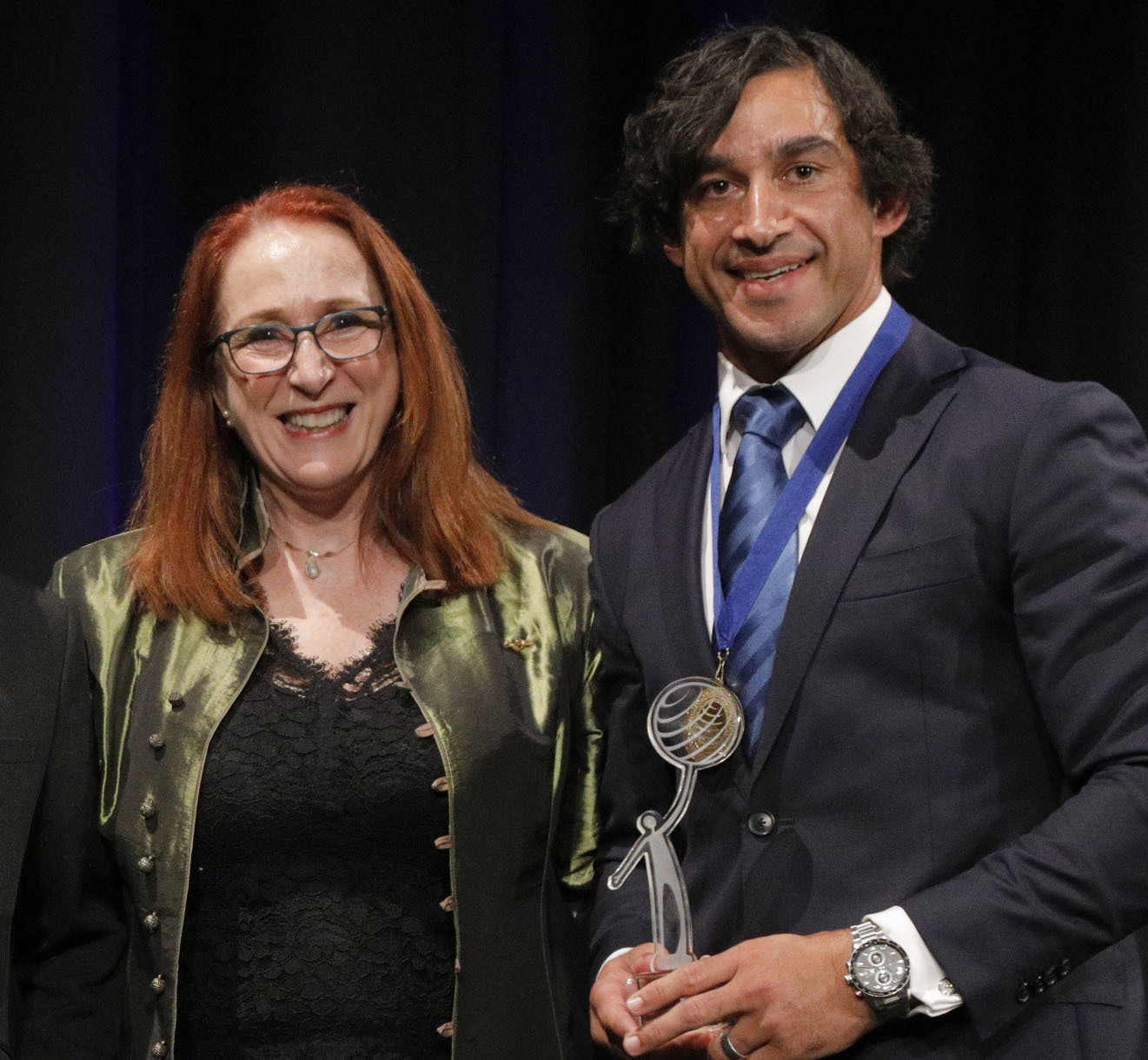
Thurston with Ros Croucher, President of the Australian Human Rights Commission, after being awarded the 2017 Human Rights Medal.

On 25 October 2008, Thurston's uncle Richard Saunders and two friends were assaulted by a group of men in Woodridge, a suburb south-east of Brisbane. Saunders later died in hospital, with eight people subsequently jailed in connection with the attack.

Thurston is a shareholder of Collings Aviation Holdings which in March 2015 bought out Cairns based airline Skytrans after it fell into administration.

Since 2008, Thurston has been in a relationship with Samantha Lynch. In June 2013, the couple had their first child together; a daughter. In March 2015 the pair welcomed their second daughter. On 3 November 2015, Johnathan and Samantha 'eloped' to Hamilton Island to marry in a private ceremony with their daughters and parents present. This news was broken by Sam on her Instagram. The couple welcomed a third daughter on 22 March 2017. Their fourth daughter, Remie Lee, arrived in February 2019.

Thurston is a Catholic and once offered a priest free air-travel to Coen to conduct Mass.

In 2022, Thurston provided a voice cameo in an episode of Australian children's show Bluey, entitled "The Decider", in which he provided sideline analysis for a fictional State of Origin match between Queensland and New South Wales.

=== Community work ===
In late 2005, Thurston was one of 13 NRL players who posed for the League of Their Own 2006 calendar that was produced in the style of the Dieux du Stade calendars to raise money for the Koori Kids foundation. Thurston was chosen to appear on the cover of the calendar. He has also worked with the Indigenous communities of North Queensland and the Australian Red Cross Blood Service. Thurston is also known for always handing — rather than throwing — his kicking tee after a place kick to the ballboy, and for giving away his headgear to a young member of the crowd at the end of a match. In December 2017 Thurston was awarded the Australian Human Rights Commission Medal for his work with Aboriginal and Torres Strait Islanders. In 2017 Thurston Also won the Queenslander of the Year award and in 2018 was nominated for the Australian of the Year award.
