= Ethan Lowe =

Australian rugby league footballer

Personal information
- Born: 20 March 1991 (age 35) Goondiwindi, Queensland, Australia
- Height: 194 cm (6 ft 4 in)
- Weight: 107 kg (16 st 12 lb)

Playing information
- Position: Second-row
Club
Years	Team	Pld	T	G	FG	P
2013–18	North Qld Cowboys	108	19	69	0	214
2019–20	South Sydney	35	5	0	0	20
	Total	143	24	69	0	234
Representative
Years	Team	Pld	T	G	FG	P
2019	Queensland	1	0	4	0	8
- Source: As of 19 November 2020

Ethan Lowe (born 20 March 1991) is an Australian former professional rugby league footballer who played as a goal kicking second-row for the North Queensland Cowboys and South Sydney Rabbitohs in the NRL.

Lowe was a member of the North Queensland Cowboys' 2015 NRL Grand Final and 2016 World Club Challenge winning sides and played for Queensland in the 2019 State of Origin series.

== Background ==
Lowe was born in Goondiwindi, Queensland, Australia.

He played his first junior rugby league for the Goondiwindi Boars. Upon entering high school, Lowe moved to Toowoomba where he attended Downlands College and later St. Mary's College. While living in Toowoomba he played rugby league for Valleys Toowoomba.

In 2008, Lowe was selected for the Australian Schoolboys side but was ruled out due to a wrist injury. That year he represented the Queensland Under 18 Maroons in a match against NSW Country.

After finishing high school, Lowe signed with the Sydney Roosters for the 2009 season. That year he played for the Newtown Jets SG Ball side and made his debut for the Roosters NYC team. Between 2009 and 2011, Lowe played 61 games and scored 19 tries for the Roosters under 20's team. In 2009, Lowe played for the Queensland Under 18's. In 2010, he was a member of the Junior Kangaroos squad, but did not play a game. In 2011, Lowe represented the Junior Kangaroos in a game against the Junior Kiwis.

In 2012, Lowe returned to Queensland to play with the Northern Pride RLFC. That season, Lowe was named the Intrust Super Cup Rookie of the Year.

In August 2012, Lowe signed a one-year deal with the North Queensland Cowboys for the 2013 season.

== Playing career ==
=== 2013 ===
In Round 12, Lowe made his NRL debut for the Cowboys against the Gold Coast Titans off the interchange bench, scoring a try in the Cowboys 31-12 loss at Cbus Super Stadium. On 5 August 2013, Lowe re-signed with the Cowboys for a further 2 years, keeping him at the club till the end of the 2015 season. Lowe played in 2 matches, scored 1 try and kicked 3 goals in his debut year in the NRL.

=== 2014 ===
On 10 July, Lowe received a two match suspension from the NRL after being found to have placed a bet on an NRL matches. Lowe finished the NRL season after playing 10 matches, scoring 3 tries and kicking 4 goals.

The forward then returned to play for the Northern Pride where he went on to win the Queensland Cup and the NRL State Championship.

=== 2015 ===
On 31 January and 1 February, Lowe played for the Cowboys in the 2015 NRL Auckland Nines. On 8 May, after establishing himself in the Cowboys' starting side, he re-signed with the club until the end of 2016. On 4 October, in the Cowboys' Queensland derby 2015 NRL Grand Final against the Brisbane Broncos, he started at second row in the Cowboys' historic golden-point 17-16 win. He finished off his premiership winning 2015 season having played in all the Cowboys' 28 matches, scoring 4 tries and kicking 8 goals.

=== 2016 ===
On 12 January, Lowe was selected in the QAS Emerging Origin squad. In February, he played for the Cowboys in the 2016 NRL Auckland Nines. On 21 February, he was a member of the Cowboys' 2016 World Club Challenge winning side, starting at second-row in the side's 38-4 victory over the Leeds Rhinos at Headingley Stadium.

On 1 July, Lowe re-signed with the Cowboys for a further 2 years, keeping him at the club until the end of the 2018 season.

On 14 September, Lowe was ruled out for the remainder of the 2016 season with a spinal cord injury.

=== 2017 ===
In January, Lowe was once again a member of the QAS Emerging Origin squad. Following a season-ending injury to regular goal kicker Johnathan Thurston, Lowe took over the role and finished as the club's top point scorer for the first time with 102 points in 28 games. On 1 October, Lowe started at second row in the Cowboys' 2017 NRL Grand Final loss to the Melbourne Storm, kicking a goal.

=== 2018 ===
Lowe endured a difficult 2018 NRL season, being relegated to the interchange from his usual starting role in Round 3. In Round 7, he played his 100th NRL game in the Cowboys' 26-14 win over the Gold Coast Titans.

In Round 15, he was dropped to the Queensland Cup, playing for the Northern Pride. He played nine games for the side before earning an NRL recall for the final three rounds of the season. He finished the season with 15 NRL appearances and did not score a try or kick a goal for the first time in his career. On 16 October, the Cowboys' confirmed that Lowe had taken up his player option to remain at the club for the 2019 season.

=== 2019 ===
On 26 February, Lowe was granted an immediate release from the final year of his contract by the Cowboys to join the South Sydney Rabbitohs on a one-year deal. In round 3 he scored his first try for the Rabbitohs in their 28-20 win over the Gold Coast Titans. On 26 June 2019 Ethan Lowe re-signed for the South Sydney Rabbitohs until the end of the 2021 NRL season. On 11 July, Lowe made his debut for Queensland in Game 3 of the 2019 State of Origin series in place of the injured Matt Gillett. Although Queensland lost the series, Lowe impressed on debut, kicking four goals from four attempts and charging down a kick that led to a try to Josh Papalii.

=== 2020 ===
In Round 10 against the Newcastle Knights, Lowe suffered a recurrence of a neck injury first sustained in 2016 and took no further part in the season. Lowe finished the 2020 season in the NRL playing in 10 matches, scoring 1 try.

On 17 October 2020, Lowe announced his immediate retirement from the NRL due to chronic injuries.

== Post playing ==
After retiring from playing Lowe became a mortgage broker and secured work with TabCorb. In 2024, Lowe announced that he was suing the NRL insurer after they denied his claim of permanent hemiplegia after his career was ended by a crusher tackle. It was announced that a few weeks after launching the action against the insurer and the federal judge had dismissed the case on findings that Lowe was not suffering from permanent hemiplegia after evidence produced included him dancing at a concert and a photo of him jet skiing.

== Achievements and accolades ==
=== Individual ===
- North Queensland Cowboys Most Improved: 2016

=== Team ===
- 2015 NRL Grand Final: North Queensland Cowboys – Winners
- 2016 World Club Challenge: North Queensland Cowboys – Winners

== Statistics ==
=== NRL ===
Statistics are correct to the end of the 2020 season

†	Denotes seasons in which Lowe won an NRL Premiership

Season	Team	Matches	T	G	GK %	F/G	Pts
2013	North Queensland	2	1	3	100.0	0	10
2014	North Queensland	10	3	4	66.7	0	20
2015†	North Queensland	28	4	8	66.7	0	32
2016	North Queensland	25	9	7	77.8	0	50
2017	North Queensland	28	2	47	79.6	0	102
2018	North Queensland	15	0	-	-	0	0
2019	South Sydney	25	4	0	0.0	0	16
2020	South Sydney	10	1	-	-	0	4
Career totals		143	24	69	76.67	0	234

=== State of Origin ===
Season	Team	Matches	T	G	GK %	F/G	Pts
2019	Queensland	1	0	4	100.0	0	8
Career totals		1	0	4	100.00	0	8
