= List of NRL Women's Grand finals =

There have been eight NRL Women's premiership seasons. Each season, the tournament is decided by a grand final. This is a list of all the grand finals that were played to decide those premierships.

== List ==
Season	Premiers	Score	Runners-up	Referee(s)	Venue	Date
NRL Women's Premiership
2018	Brisbane Broncos	34 – 12	Sydney Roosters	J. Stone K. Badger	ANZ Stadium; Sydney	30 September 2018
2019	Brisbane Broncos (2)	30 – 6	St George Illawarra Dragons	K. Badger D. Schwass	ANZ Stadium; Sydney	6 October 2019
2020	Brisbane Broncos (3)	20 – 10	Sydney Roosters	B. Sharpe	ANZ Stadium; Sydney	25 October 2020
2021	Sydney Roosters	16 – 4	St George Illawarra Dragons	B. Sharpe	Moreton Daily Stadium; Brisbane	10 April 2022
2022	Newcastle Knights	32 – 12	Parramatta Eels	K. Badger	Accor Stadium; Sydney	2 October 2022
2023	Newcastle Knights (2)	24 – 18	Gold Coast Titans	B. Sharpe	Accor Stadium; Sydney	1 October 2023
2024	Sydney Roosters (2)	32 – 28	Cronulla Sharks	Z. Przeklasa-Adamski	Accor Stadium; Sydney	6 October 2024
2025	Brisbane Broncos (4)	22 – 18	Sydney Roosters	B. Sharpe	Accor Stadium; Sydney	5 October 2025
2026	Sydney Roosters (3)	30 – 6	Brisbane Broncos	B. Sharpe	Accor Stadium; Sydney	4 October 2025

=== Team performance ===
Team	Winners	Runners-up	Years won	Years runner-up
Brisbane Broncos	4	1	2018, 2019, 2020, 2025	2026
Sydney Roosters	3	3	2021, 2024, 2026	2018, 2020, 2025
Newcastle Knights	2	0	2022, 2023	—
St George Illawarra Dragons	0	2	—	2019, 2021
Parramatta Eels	0	1	—	2022
Gold Coast Titans	0	1	—	2023
Cronulla Sharks	0	1	—	2024

== See also ==
- List of NRL Grand finals
