= 2015 Dally M Awards =

- Date: 28 September
- Location: The Star Sydney
- Hosted by: Matthew Johns
- Dally M Medal: Johnathan Thurston

Television/radio coverage
- Network: Fox Sports

The 2015 Dally M Awards were presented on Monday 28 September 2015 at Sydney's Star Casino and was broadcast on Fox Sports. They are the official annual awards of the National Rugby League and are named after Dally Messenger. Halfback Johnathan Thurston won the Dally M Medal with a record margin of 11 votes, overtaking Andrew Johns in becoming the first player to claim the award for the fourth time.

== Dally M Medal ==
Player votes tally – Top 10
Points	Player
32	Johnathan Thurston
21	Aaron Woods
21	Benji Marshall
21	Michael Ennis
18	Ben Hunt
17	Cameron Smith
17	James Maloney
16	Blake Austin
16	Corey Norman
16	Roger Tuivasa-Sheck
16	Jared Waerea-Hargreaves
16	James Tedesco

== Dally M Awards ==
The Dally M Awards are, as usual, conducted at the close of the regular season and hence do not take games played in the finals series into account. The Dally M Medal is for the official player of the year while the Provan-Summons Medal is for the fans' of "people's choice" player of the year.

Award	Player
Provan-Summons Medal	Johnathan Thurston
Peter Moore Award for Rookie of the Year	Jack Bird
Captain of the Year	Johnathan Thurston & Matt Scott
Representative Player of the Year	Corey Parker
Coach of the Year	Wayne Bennett
Top Tryscorer of the Year	Semi Radradra – 24
Top Pointscorer of the Year	Jarrod Croker – 236
Peter Frilingos Memorial Award for Headline Moment of the Year	Nathan Friend's try assist, New Zealand Warriors vs. Melbourne Storm, Round 18
Holden Cup Player of the Year	Ashley Taylor
Female Player of the Year	Jenni-Sue Hoepper

Team of the Year

Award	Player
Best Fullback	Roger Tuivasa-Sheck
Best Winger	Semi Radradra
Best Centre	James Roberts
Best Five-Eighth	Blake Austin
Best Halfback	Johnathan Thurston
Best Lock	Jason Taumalolo
Best Second-Rower	Josh Jackson
Best Prop	Aaron Woods
Best Hooker	Michael Ennis

== Presenters ==
- Matthew Johns
- Tony Squires

== See also ==
- Dally M Awards
- Dally M Medal
- 2015 NRL season
