= List of National Rugby League Premiers =

Australian rugby league premiers
- Founded
- 1908
- Country
- Australia; New Zealand
- Editions completed
- 118
- Number of teams
- 17
- Current premiers
- Sydney Roosters (16th title)
- Most titles won
- South Sydney Rabbitohs (21 titles)

As of the end of 2026, there have been 29 NRL Premierships and 119 including the lesser, state premierships, (NSWRL and ARL). This is a list of all the grand finals that were played to decide those premierships.

Between 1912 and 1925, and again in 1937, the NSW premiership was decided on a first-past-the-post basis, with a final only played if two teams finished with an equal amount of competition points. This happened in 1916, 1922, 1923 and 1924.

From 1926 until 1953, the second amended Argus System was used, whereby the minor premiers had the right to challenge the winner of the final to a grand final to decide the premiership.

From 1954, the grand final became the only way to determine the premiership.

== List ==
=== NSWRL/ARL/NRL Premiers (1908–present) ===
Season	Premiers	Score	Runners-up	Venue	Attendance
New South Wales Rugby League
1908	South Sydney Rabbitohs	14–12	Eastern Suburbs	RAS Showground	4,000
1909	South Sydney Rabbitohs (2)	N/A	Balmain Tigers	N/A	N/A
1910	Newtown Jets	4–4	South Sydney Rabbitohs	RAS Showground	14,000
1911	Eastern Suburbs	11–8	Glebe Dirty Reds	RAS Showground	20,000
1912	Eastern Suburbs (2)	N/A	Glebe Dirty Reds	N/A	N/A
1913	Eastern Suburbs (3)	N/A	Newtown Jets	N/A	N/A
1914	South Sydney Rabbitohs (3)	N/A	Newtown Jets	N/A	N/A
1915	Balmain Tigers	N/A	Glebe Dirty Reds	N/A	N/A
1916	Balmain Tigers (2)	5–3	South Sydney Rabbitohs	Sydney Cricket Ground	7,000
1917	Balmain Tigers (3)	N/A	South Sydney Rabbitohs	N/A	N/A
1918	South Sydney Rabbitohs (4)	N/A	Western Suburbs Magpies	N/A	N/A
1919	Balmain Tigers (4)	N/A	Eastern Suburbs	N/A	N/A
1920	Balmain Tigers (5)	N/A	South Sydney Rabbitohs	N/A	N/A
1921	North Sydney Bears	N/A	Eastern Suburbs	N/A	N/A
1922	North Sydney Bears (2)	35–3	Glebe Dirty Reds	Sydney Cricket Ground	15,000
1923	Eastern Suburbs (4)	15–12	South Sydney Rabbitohs	Sydney Cricket Ground	15,000
1924	Balmain Tigers (6)	3–0	South Sydney Rabbitohs	Sydney Cricket Ground	15,000
1925	South Sydney Rabbitohs (5)	N/A	Western Suburbs Magpies	N/A	N/A
1926	South Sydney Rabbitohs (6)	11–5	Sydney University	RAS Showground	20,000
1927	South Sydney Rabbitohs (7)	20–11	St. George Dragons	RAS Showground	8,000
1928	South Sydney Rabbitohs (8)	26–5	Eastern Suburbs	RAS Showground	25,000
1929	South Sydney Rabbitohs (9)	30–10	Newtown Jets	Sydney Sports Ground	16,360
1930	Western Suburbs Magpies	27–2	St. George Dragons	Sydney Sports Ground	12,178
1931	South Sydney Rabbitohs (10)	12–7	Eastern Suburbs	Sydney Sports Ground	27,104
1932	South Sydney Rabbitohs (11)	19–12	Western Suburbs Magpies	Sydney Sports Ground	16,925
1933	Newtown Jets (2)	18–5	St. George Dragons	Sydney Sports Ground	18,080
1934	Western Suburbs Magpies (2)	15–12	Eastern Suburbs	Sydney Sports Ground	25,174
1935	Eastern Suburbs (5)	19–3	South Sydney Rabbitohs	Sydney Cricket Ground	22,106
1936	Eastern Suburbs (6)	32–12	Balmain Tigers	Sydney Cricket Ground	14,395
1937	Eastern Suburbs (7)	N/A	South Sydney Rabbitohs	N/A	N/A
1938	Canterbury-Bankstown Bulldogs	19–6	Eastern Suburbs	Sydney Cricket Ground	20,287
1939	Balmain Tigers (7)	33–4	South Sydney Rabbitohs	Sydney Cricket Ground	26,972
1940	Eastern Suburbs (8)	24–14	Canterbury-Bankstown Bulldogs	Sydney Cricket Ground	24,167
1941	St. George Dragons	31–14	Eastern Suburbs	Sydney Cricket Ground	39,957
1942	Canterbury-Bankstown Bulldogs (2)	11–9	St. George Dragons	Sydney Cricket Ground	26,171
1943	Newtown Jets (3)	34–7	North Sydney Bears	Sydney Cricket Ground	60,922
1944	Balmain Tigers (8)	12–8	Newtown Jets	Sydney Cricket Ground	24,186
1945	Eastern Suburbs (9)	22–18	Balmain Tigers	Sydney Cricket Ground	44,585
1946	Balmain Tigers (9)	13–12	St. George Dragons	Sydney Sports Ground	32,296
1947	Balmain Tigers (10)	13–9	Canterbury-Bankstown Bulldogs	Sydney Sports Ground	29,292
1948	Western Suburbs Magpies (3)	8–5	Balmain Tigers	Sydney Sports Ground	29,122
1949	St. George Dragons (2)	19–12	South Sydney Rabbitohs	Sydney Cricket Ground	56,534
1950	South Sydney Rabbitohs (12)	21–15	Western Suburbs Magpies	Sydney Sports Ground	32,373
1951	South Sydney Rabbitohs (13)	42–14	Manly-Warringah Sea Eagles	Sydney Sports Ground	28,505
1952	Western Suburbs Magpies (4)	22–12	South Sydney Rabbitohs	Sydney Cricket Ground	41,060
1953	South Sydney Rabbitohs (14)	31–12	St. George Dragons	Sydney Cricket Ground	44,581
1954	South Sydney Rabbitohs (15)	23–15	Newtown Jets	Sydney Cricket Ground	45,759
1955	South Sydney Rabbitohs (16)	12–11	Newtown Jets	Sydney Cricket Ground	42,466
1956	St. George Dragons (3)	18–12	Balmain Tigers	Sydney Cricket Ground	61,987
1957	St. George Dragons (4)	31–9	Manly-Warringah Sea Eagles	Sydney Cricket Ground	54,399
1958	St. George Dragons (5)	20–9	Western Suburbs Magpies	Sydney Cricket Ground	62,283
1959	St. George Dragons (6)	20–0	Manly-Warringah Sea Eagles	Sydney Cricket Ground	49,457
1960	St. George Dragons (7)	31–6	Eastern Suburbs	Sydney Cricket Ground	53,156
1961	St. George Dragons (8)	22–0	Western Suburbs Magpies	Sydney Cricket Ground	61,196
1962	St. George Dragons (9)	9–6	Western Suburbs Magpies	Sydney Cricket Ground	41,184
1963	St. George Dragons (10)	8–3	Western Suburbs Magpies	Sydney Cricket Ground	69,860
1964	St. George Dragons (11)	11–6	Balmain Tigers	Sydney Cricket Ground	61,369
1965	St. George Dragons (12)	12–8	South Sydney Rabbitohs	Sydney Cricket Ground	78,056
1966	St. George Dragons (13)	23–4	Balmain Tigers	Sydney Cricket Ground	61,129
1967	South Sydney Rabbitohs (17)	12–10	Canterbury-Bankstown Bulldogs	Sydney Cricket Ground	56,358
1968	South Sydney Rabbitohs (18)	13–9	Manly Warringah Sea Eagles	Sydney Cricket Ground	54,255
1969	Balmain Tigers (11)	11–2	South Sydney Rabbitohs	Sydney Cricket Ground	58,825
1970	South Sydney Rabbitohs (19)	23–12	Manly Warringah Sea Eagles	Sydney Cricket Ground	53,241
1971	South Sydney Rabbitohs (20)	16–10	St. George Dragons	Sydney Cricket Ground	62,838
1972	Manly Warringah Sea Eagles	19–14	Eastern Suburbs Roosters	Sydney Cricket Ground	54,357
1973	Manly Warringah Sea Eagles (2)	10–7	Cronulla-Sutherland Sharks	Sydney Cricket Ground	52,044
1974	Eastern Suburbs Roosters (10)	19–4	Canterbury-Bankstown Bulldogs	Sydney Cricket Ground	57,214
1975	Eastern Suburbs Roosters (11)	38–0	St. George Dragons	Sydney Cricket Ground	63,047
1976	Manly Warringah Sea Eagles (3)	13–10	Parramatta Eels	Sydney Cricket Ground	57,343
1977	St. George Dragons	9–9	Parramatta Eels	Sydney Cricket Ground	65,959
1977	St. George Dragons (14)	22–0	Parramatta Eels	Sydney Cricket Ground	47,828
1978	Manly Warringah Sea Eagles	11–11	Cronulla-Sutherland Sharks	Sydney Cricket Ground	51,510
1978	Manly Warringah Sea Eagles (4)	16–0	Cronulla-Sutherland Sharks	Sydney Cricket Ground	33,552
1979	St. George Dragons (15)	17–13	Canterbury-Bankstown Bulldogs	Sydney Cricket Ground	50,991
1980	Canterbury-Bankstown Bulldogs (3)	18–4	Eastern Suburbs Roosters	Sydney Cricket Ground	52,881
1981	Parramatta Eels	20–11	Newtown Jets	Sydney Cricket Ground	57,333
1982	Parramatta Eels (2)	21–8	Manly Warringah Sea Eagles	Sydney Cricket Ground	52,186
1983	Parramatta Eels (3)	18–6	Manly Warringah Sea Eagles	Sydney Cricket Ground	40,285
1984	Canterbury-Bankstown Bulldogs (4)	6–4	Parramatta Eels	Sydney Cricket Ground	47,076
1985	Canterbury-Bankstown Bulldogs (5)	7–6	St. George Dragons	Sydney Cricket Ground	44,569
1986	Parramatta Eels (4)	4–2	Canterbury-Bankstown Bulldogs	Sydney Cricket Ground	45,843
1987	Manly Warringah Sea Eagles (5)	18–8	Canberra Raiders	Sydney Cricket Ground	50,201
1988	Canterbury-Bankstown Bulldogs (6)	24–12	Balmain Tigers	Sydney Football Stadium (1988)	40,000
1989	Canberra Raiders	19–14	Balmain Tigers	Sydney Football Stadium (1988)	40,500
1990	Canberra Raiders (2)	18–14	Penrith Panthers	Sydney Football Stadium (1988)	41,535
1991	Penrith Panthers	19–12	Canberra Raiders	Sydney Football Stadium (1988)	41,815
1992	Brisbane Broncos	28–8	St. George Dragons	Sydney Football Stadium (1988)	41,560
1993	Brisbane Broncos (2)	14–6	St. George Dragons	Sydney Football Stadium (1988)	42,329
1994	Canberra Raiders (3)	36–12	Canterbury-Bankstown Bulldogs	Sydney Football Stadium (1988)	42,234
Australian Rugby League
1995	Sydney Bulldogs (7)	17–4	Manly Warringah Sea Eagles	Sydney Football Stadium (1988)	41,127
1996	Manly Warringah Sea Eagles (6)	20–8	St. George Dragons	Sydney Football Stadium (1988)	40,985
1997	Newcastle Knights	22–16	Manly Warringah Sea Eagles	Sydney Football Stadium (1988)	42,482
National Rugby League
1998	Brisbane Broncos (4)	38–12	Canterbury-Bankstown Bulldogs	Sydney Football Stadium	40,857
1999	Melbourne Storm	20–18	St. George Illawarra Dragons	Stadium Australia	107,999
2000	Brisbane Broncos (5)	14–6	Sydney Roosters	Stadium Australia	94,277
2001	Newcastle Knights (2)	30–24	Parramatta Eels	Stadium Australia	90,414
2002	Sydney Roosters (12)	30–8	New Zealand Warriors	Stadium Australia	80,130
2003	Penrith Panthers (2)	18–6	Sydney Roosters	Stadium Australia	81,166
2004	Canterbury-Bankstown Bulldogs (8)	16–13	Sydney Roosters	Stadium Australia	82,127
2005	Wests Tigers	30–16	North Queensland Cowboys	Stadium Australia	82,453
2006	Brisbane Broncos (6)	15–8	Melbourne Storm	Stadium Australia	79,609
2007	~~Melbourne Storm~~ (Note: Melbourne were stripped of their 2007 and 2009 premierships due to salary cap breaches.)	34–8	Manly Warringah Sea Eagles	Stadium Australia	81,392
2008	Manly Warringah Sea Eagles (7)	40–0	Melbourne Storm	Stadium Australia	80,388
2009	~~Melbourne Storm~~	23–16	Parramatta Eels	Stadium Australia	82,538
2010	St. George Illawarra Dragons	32–8	Sydney Roosters	Stadium Australia	82,334
2011	Manly Warringah Sea Eagles (8)	24–10	New Zealand Warriors	Stadium Australia	81,988
2012	Melbourne Storm (2)	14–4	Canterbury-Bankstown Bulldogs	Stadium Australia	82,976
2013	Sydney Roosters (13)	26–18	Manly Warringah Sea Eagles	Stadium Australia	81,491
2014	South Sydney Rabbitohs (21)	30–6	Canterbury-Bankstown Bulldogs	Stadium Australia	83,833
2015	North Queensland Cowboys	17–16	Brisbane Broncos	Stadium Australia	82,758
2016	Cronulla-Sutherland Sharks	14–12	Melbourne Storm	Stadium Australia	83,625
2017	Melbourne Storm (3)	34–6	North Queensland Cowboys	Stadium Australia	79,722
2018	Sydney Roosters (14)	21–6	Melbourne Storm	Stadium Australia	82,688
2019	Sydney Roosters (15)	14–8	Canberra Raiders	Stadium Australia	82,922
2020	Melbourne Storm (4)	26–20	Penrith Panthers	Stadium Australia	37,303
2021	Penrith Panthers (3)	14–12	South Sydney Rabbitohs	Lang Park	39,322
2022	Penrith Panthers (4)	28–12	Parramatta Eels	Stadium Australia	82,415
2023	Penrith Panthers (5)	26–24	Brisbane Broncos	Stadium Australia	81,947
2024	Penrith Panthers (6)	14–6	Melbourne Storm	Stadium Australia	80,156
2025	Brisbane Broncos (7)	26–22	Melbourne Storm	Stadium Australia	80,223
2026	Sydney Roosters (16)	19–18	Newcastle Knights	Stadium Australia	80,814

=== Super League Premiers (1997)* ===
Season	Premiers	Score	Runners-up	Venue	Attendance
Super League
1997	Brisbane Broncos (3)	26–8	Cronulla-Sutherland Sharks (3)	Queen Elizabeth II Stadium	58,912

=== Team performance ===
Table key
†	Club no longer participates in the NRL

	Team	Winners	Runners-up	Years won	Years runner-up
1	South Sydney Rabbitohs	21	14	1908, 1909, 1914, 1918, 1925, 1926, 1927, 1928, 1929, 1931, 1932, 1950, 1951, 1953, 1954, 1955, 1967, 1968, 1970, 1971, 2014	1910, 1916, 1917, 1920, 1923, 1924, 1935, 1937, 1939, 1949, 1952, 1965, 1969, 2021
2	Sydney Roosters (Note: Known as Eastern Suburbs 1908–1994, Sydney City Roosters 1995–1999)	16	15	1911, 1912, 1913, 1923, 1935, 1936, 1937, 1940, 1945, 1974, 1975, 2002, 2013, 2018, 2019, 2026	1908, 1919, 1921, 1928, 1931, 1934, 1938, 1941, 1960, 1972, 1980, 2000, 2003, 2004, 2010
2	St. George Dragons^{†}	15	12	1941, 1949, 1956, 1957, 1958, 1959, 1960, 1961, 1962, 1963, 1964, 1965, 1966, 1977, 1979	1927, 1930, 1933, 1942, 1946, 1953, 1971, 1975, 1985, 1992, 1993, 1996
4	Balmain Tigers^{†}	11	9	1915, 1916, 1917, 1919, 1920, 1924, 1939, 1944, 1946, 1947, 1969	1909, 1936, 1945, 1948, 1956, 1964, 1966, 1988, 1989
5	Manly Warringah Sea Eagles	8	11	1972, 1973, 1976, 1978, 1987, 1996, 2008, 2011	1951, 1957, 1959, 1968, 1970, 1982, 1983, 1995, 1997^{ARL}, 2007, 2013
5	Canterbury-Bankstown Bulldogs	8	10	1938, 1942, 1980, 1984, 1985, 1988, 1995, 2004	1940, 1947, 1967, 1974, 1979, 1986, 1994, 1998, 2012, 2014
7	Brisbane Broncos	7	2	1992, 1993, 1997^{SL}, 1998, 2000, 2006, 2025	2015, 2023
8	Penrith Panthers	6	2	1991, 2003, 2021, 2022, 2023, 2024	1990, 2020
9	Western Suburbs Magpies^{†}	4	8	1930, 1934, 1948, 1952	1918, 1925, 1932, 1950, 1958, 1961, 1962, 1963
9	Parramatta Eels	4	6	1981, 1982, 1983, 1986	1976, 1977, 1984, 2001, 2009, 2022
9	Melbourne Storm	4	6	1999, 2012, 2017, 2020	2006, 2008, 2016, 2018, 2024, 2025
12	Newtown Jets^{†}	3	7	1910, 1933, 1943	1913, 1914, 1929, 1944, 1954, 1955, 1981
12	Canberra Raiders	3	3	1989, 1990, 1994	1987, 1991, 2019
14	North Sydney Bears^{†}	2	1	1921, 1922	1943
14	Newcastle Knights	2	1	1997^{ARL}, 2001	2026
16	Cronulla-Sutherland Sharks	1	3	2016	1973, 1978, 1997^{SL}
16	North Queensland Cowboys	1	2	2015	2005, 2017
16	St. George Illawarra Dragons	1	1	2010	1999
16	Wests Tigers	1	0	2005	—
20	Glebe Dirty Reds^{†}	0	4	—	1911, 1912, 1915, 1922
20	New Zealand Warriors	0	2	—	2002, 2011

=== Consecutive premierships ===
#	Team	Years
11	St. George	1956, 1957, 1958, 1959, 1960, 1961, 1962, 1963, 1964, 1965, 1966
5	South Sydney	1925, 1926, 1927, 1928, 1929
4	Penrith	2021, 2022, 2023, 2024
3	Eastern Suburbs	1911, 1912, 1913
3	Balmain	1915, 1916, 1917
3	Eastern Suburbs	1935, 1936, 1937
3	South Sydney	1953, 1954, 1955
3	Parramatta	1981, 1982, 1983
2	South Sydney	1908, 1909
2	Balmain	1919, 1920
2	North Sydney	1921, 1922
2	South Sydney	1931, 1932
2	Balmain	1946, 1947
2	South Sydney	1950, 1951
2	South Sydney	1967, 1968
2	South Sydney	1970, 1971
2	Manly Warringah	1972, 1973
2	Eastern Suburbs	1974, 1975
2	Canterbury-Bankstown	1984, 1985
2	Canberra	1989, 1990
2	Brisbane	1992, 1993
2	Brisbane	1997 (SL), 1998
2	Sydney	2018, 2019

=== Most common match-ups ===
#	Match-up	Grand finals	Results (Wins)
5	South Sydney vs Sydney	1908, 1923, 1928, 1931, 1935	South Sydney (3), Sydney (2)
5	Western Suburbs vs St. George	1930, 1958, 1961, 1962, 1963	St. George (4), Western Suburbs (1)
5	South Sydney vs St. George	1927, 1949, 1953, 1965, 1971	South Sydney (3), St. George (2)
5	Canterbury-Bankstown vs Sydney	1938, 1940, 1974, 1980, 2004	Canterbury-Bankstown (3), Sydney (2)
4	Balmain vs St. George	1946, 1956, 1964, 1966	Balmain (1), St. George (3)
4	Balmain vs South Sydney	1916, 1924, 1939, 1969	Balmain (4), South Sydney (0)
3	St. George vs Sydney	1941, 1960, 1975	St. George (2), Sydney (1)
3	South Sydney vs Newtown	1929, 1954, 1955	South Sydney (3), Newtown (0)
3	South Sydney vs Manly Warringah	1951, 1968, 1970	South Sydney (3), Manly Warringah (0)
3	Canterbury-Bankstown vs St. George	1942, 1979, 1985	Canterbury-Bankstown (2), St. George (1)
3	Parramatta Eels vs Manly Warringah	1976, 1982, 1983	Parramatta Eels (2), Manly Warringah (1)
3	St. George vs Manly Warringah	1957, 1959, 1996	St. George (2), Manly Warringah (1)

== See also ==
- List of NRL Women's Grand finals
- Australian rugby league premiers
