= 2011 Brisbane Broncos season =

Coordinates: 27°27′53″S 153°0′34″E

- NRL rank: 3rd
- Play-off result: Lost Preliminary Final, (Manly Warringah Sea Eagles, 14–26)
- 2011 record: Wins: 18; losses: 6
- Points scored: For: 511; against: 372

Team information
- CEO: Paul White
- Head Coach: Anthony Griffin
- Captain: Darren Lockyer
- Stadium: Suncorp Stadium
- Avg. attendance: 33,209
- Agg. attendance: 398,505
- High attendance: 50,859, (Manly Warringah Sea Eagles, 4 September)
- Low attendance: 21,378, (Canberra Raiders, 12 June)

Top scorers
- Tries: Jharal Yow Yeh (14)
- Goals: Corey Parker (74)
- Points: Corey Parker (160)
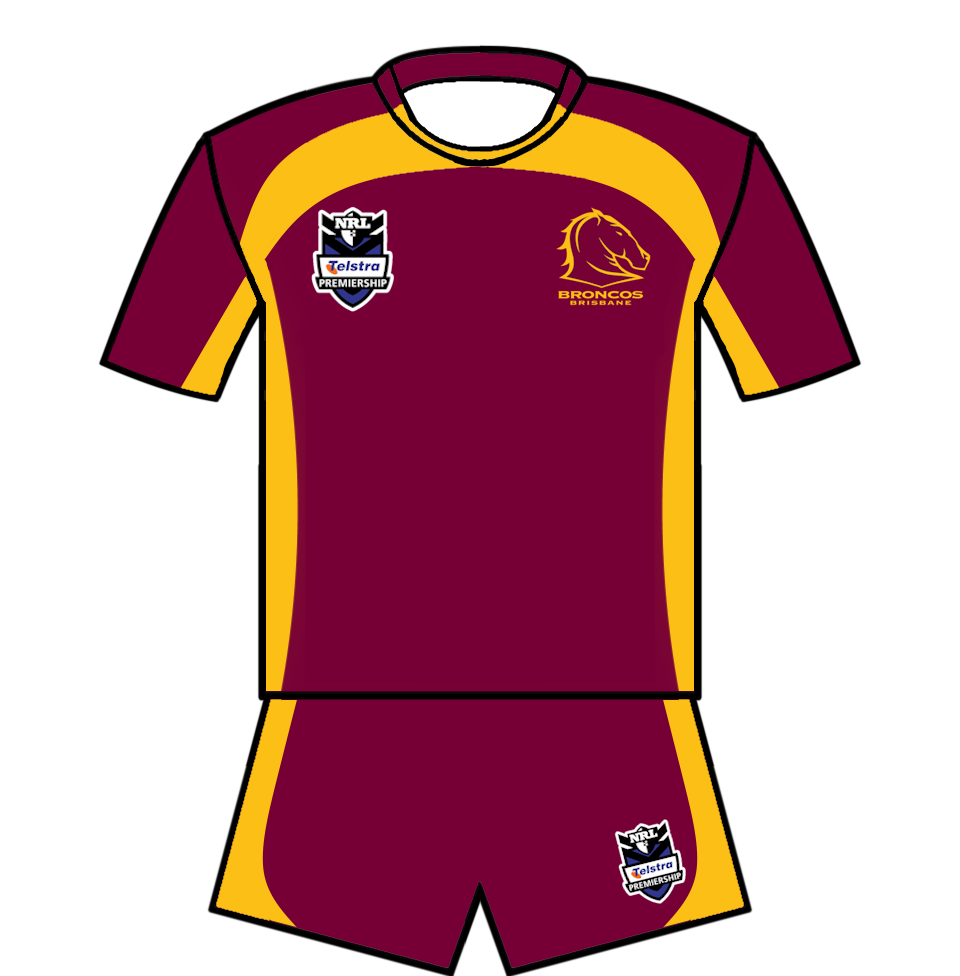
Home colours
← 2010	List of seasons	2012 →

The 2011 Brisbane Broncos season was the 24th in the club's history. They competed in the NRL's 2011 Telstra Premiership, finishing the regular season 3rd (out of 16). The Broncos then came within one match of the grand final but were knocked out by eventual premiers, the Manly-Warringah Sea Eagles. It was the last season for Brisbane's captain, all-time top points scorer and most-capped player, Darren Lockyer. Lockyer was also named the Broncos player of the season.

2011 was the Broncos' first season under new CEO, Paul White who replaced Bruno Cullen in the first week of January. The following month, head coach Ivan Henjak was replaced by his assistant Anthony Griffin. NRMA replaced WOW Sight & Sound as the naming-rights sponsor of the Broncos after signing a three-year multimillion-dollar deal.

== Season summary ==
On 21 February Broncos CEO Paul White announced that Ivan Henjak would be replaced by his assistant Anthony Griffin as head coach of the club for the 2011 NRL season, less than three weeks out from its start. In round 1, The North Queensland Cowboys ended their 7-game losing streak against the Broncos with a hard-fought 16–14 win at Suncorp Stadium. It was only the 5th win the Cowboys have had over the Broncos in their 17-year history and it was only the Broncos' 4th loss in an opening round match in their 24-year history. In round 2, The Broncos had their first win in Canberra since 2005 with a 20–4 win over the Canberra Raiders. In round 3, Justin Hodges made an immediate impact for the Broncos playing his first game since 2009, scoring the match winning try with a 14–8 win over the Gold Coast Titans at Skilled Park. In round 12, the Broncos played their first Golden Point game since 2008, defeating the Canberra Raiders 25–24 at Suncorp Stadium. In round 22, Darren Lockyer equalled the all-time record for most career games of all-time playing 349-games. The Broncos hosted the New Zealand Warriors, in a tense game, the Broncos ran out winners 21–20 at Suncorp Stadium. In round 24, Broncos secured 3rd spot for the finals with a 26–6 win over the Newcastle Knights at Ausgrid Stadium. It was also the Broncos first ever away win in a Monday Night game. Brisbane finished the regular season in 3rd place on the ladder.

Darren Lockyer kicked the winning field goal to knock defending premiers, Wayne Bennett's St. George Illawarra Dragons out of the 2011 competition and bring his team to within one match of the grand final. However, in the process Lockyer also took an accidental knee from a teammate in the face, fracturing his cheekbone over ten-minute's before the game's end. Therefore, without their captain, Brisbane needed to defeat second-placed Manly-Warringah for a chance to play in the grand final.

=== Milestones ===
- Round 1: Two players made their debuts for the club; Dane Gagai and Jack Reed. Both made their NRL debuts also.
- Round 1: Dane Gagai and Jack Reed scored their 1st career tries.
- Round 2: Alex Glenn played his 50th game for the club and his 50th career game.
- Round 8: Darren Lockyer scored his 121st career try which moved him into second on the all-time try scoring list for the Brisbane Broncos behind Steve Renouf.
- Round 12: Kurt Baptiste made his debut for the club and his debut in the NRL.
- Round 13: Scott Anderson played his 50th career game.
- Round 14: Shea Moylan made his debut for the club and his debut in the NRL.
- Round 15: David Hala scored his 1st career try.
- Round 16: Kurt Baptiste scored his 1st career try and Peter Wallace played his 100th career game.
- Round 22: Jharal Yow Yeh played his 50th game for the club and his 50th career game.
- Round 22: Darren Lockyer played his 349th career game, equalling the all-time record of club appearances.
- Round 23: Darren Lockyer played his 350th career game, broke the all-time record of club appearances.
- Round 25: Ben Te'o played his 50th game for the club.

== Squad information ==
As of 23 September 2011

Cap.	Nat.	Player	Position	First Broncos game	Previous First Grade RL club
76	(Australia)	Darren Lockyer (c)	Five-eighth	1995	—N/a
94	(Australia)	Dane Carlaw	Second-row	1999	(France) Catalans Dragons
100	(Australia)	Justin Hodges	Centre	2000	(Australia) Sydney Roosters
106	(Australia)	Corey Parker (vc)	Lock	2001	—N/a
128	(Australia)	Sam Thaiday	Second-row	2003	—N/a
139	(Australia)	Nick Kenny	Prop	2005	—N/a
144	(Australia)	Ben Hannant	Prop	2006	(Australia) Canterbury-Bankstown Bulldogs
151	(New Zealand)	John Te Reo	Hooker	2007	—N/a
158	(Australia)	Peter Wallace	Halfback	2008	(Australia) Penrith Panthers
163	(Australia)	Andrew McCullough	Hooker	2008	—N/a
165	(New Zealand)	Josh Hoffman	Fullback	2008	—N/a
169	(Australia)	Jharal Yow Yeh	Wing	2009	—N/a
171	(Samoa)	Ben Te'o	Second-row	2009	(Australia) Wests Tigers
172	(New Zealand)	Alex Glenn	Second-row	2009	—N/a
174	(Samoa)	Josh McGuire	Prop	2009	—N/a
176	(New Zealand)	Gerard Beale	Fullback	2009	—N/a
177	(Australia)	Dale Copley	Wing	2009	—N/a
178	(Australia)	Ben Hunt	Hooker	2009	—N/a
180	(Tonga)	David Hala	Prop	2009	—N/a
181	(Australia)	Scott Anderson	Prop	2010	(Australia) Melbourne Storm
182	(Australia)	Matt Gillett	Second-row	2010	—N/a
183	(Australia)	Mitchell Dodds	Prop	2010	—N/a
184	(Australia)	Corey Norman	Five-eighth	2010	—N/a
186	(Samoa)	Dunamis Lui	Prop	2010	—N/a
189	(Australia)	Dane Gagai	Wing	2011	—N/a
190	(England)	Jack Reed	Centre	2011	—N/a
191	(Papua New Guinea)	Kurt Baptiste	Hooker	2011	—N/a
192	(Australia)	Shea Moylan	Wing	2011	—N/a
–	(Australia)	Rohan Ahern	Prop	Yet to debut	(Australia) Sydney Roosters
–	(Australia)	Matt Britt	Prop	Yet to debut	—N/a
–	(Australia)	Mitchell Frei	Second-row	Yet to debut	—N/a
–	(Australia)	Justin Hunt	Fullback	Yet to debut	—N/a
–	(New Zealand)	Jordan Kahu	Fullback	Yet to debut	—N/a
–	(Australia)	Kurtis Lingwoodock	Second-row	Yet to debut	—N/a
–	(Australia)	Daniel Ogden	Wing	Yet to debut	—N/a
–	(Australia)	Aaron Whitchurch	Centre	Yet to debut	—N/a

== Squad Movement ==
=== Gains ===
Date	Position	Player	From	Year/s	Ref.
25 May 2010	Prop	Ben Hannant	Canterbury-Bankstown Bulldogs	4 Years	
2 November 2010	Hooker	John Te Reo	Wynnum Manly Seagulls	1 Year	
30 November 2010	Second-row	Dane Carlaw	Catalans Dragons	1 Year	
Feb-March 2011	Centre	Jack Reed	Norths Devils	2 Years	

=== Losses ===
Date	Position	Player	To	Year/s	Ref.
29 May 2010	Prop	Lagi Setu	Mormon Mission	2012	
1 June 2010	Centre	Israel Folau	GWS Giants (AFL)	2014	
14 June 2010	Wing	Antonio Winterstein	North Queensland Cowboys	3 Years	
3 August 2010	Prop	Ashton Sims	North Queensland Cowboys	2 Years	
3 August 2010	Prop	Tariq Sims	North Queensland Cowboys	2 Years	
14 April 2011	Wing	Denan Kemp	Southern Districts Rugby	?	
29 July 2011	Prop	Shane Tronc	Retirement	—N/a	

=== Contract extensions ===
Date	Position	Player	Year/s	Ref.
27 April 2011	Lock	Corey Parker	3 Years	
11 May 2011	Centre	Justin Hodges	3 Years	
12 May 2011	Wing	Dale Copley	2013	
12 May 2011	Lock	Dunamis Lui	2013	
24 June 2011	Hooker	Kurt Baptiste	2013	
28 June 2011	Prop	Scott Anderson	2013	
9 August 2011	Second-row	Sam Thaiday	2015	
26 October 2011	Fullback	Josh Hoffman	2015	
26 October 2011	Prop	Josh McGuire	2015	

== Coaching staff ==
Role	Name	Ref.
Head coach	Anthony Griffin	
Assistant Coach	Allan Langer	
Strength	Dan Barker	
High Performance Chief	Tony Guilfoyle	
Performance	Andrew Croll	
General Manager - Football Operations	Andrew Gee	
NYC Head Coach	Kurt Richards	

== Ladder ==
2011 NRL Telstra Premiership
Pos.	Team	Pld	W	D	L	B	PF	PA	PD	Pts
1	Melbourne Storm	24	19	0	5	2	521	308	213	42
2	Manly Warringah Sea Eagles (P)	24	18	0	6	2	539	331	208	40
3	Brisbane Broncos	24	18	0	6	2	511	372	139	40
4	Wests Tigers	24	15	0	9	2	519	430	89	34
5	St. George Illawarra Dragons	24	14	1	9	2	483	341	142	33
6	New Zealand Warriors	24	14	0	10	2	504	393	111	32
7	North Queensland Cowboys	24	14	0	10	2	532	480	52	32
8	Newcastle Knights	24	12	0	12	2	478	443	35	28
9	Canterbury-Bankstown Bulldogs	24	12	0	12	2	449	489	-40	28
10	South Sydney Rabbitohs	24	11	0	13	2	531	562	-31	26
11	Sydney Roosters	24	10	0	14	2	417	500	-83	24
12	Penrith Panthers	24	9	0	15	2	430	517	-87	22
13	Cronulla-Sutherland Sharks	24	7	0	17	2	428	557	-129	18
14	Parramatta Eels	24	6	1	17	2	385	538	-153	17
15	Canberra Raiders	24	6	0	18	2	423	623	-200	16
16	Gold Coast Titans	24	6	0	18	2	363	629	-266	16

== Fixtures ==
=== Pre-season ===
Date	Round	Opponent	Venue	Score	Tries	Goals	Attendance
Saturday, 12 February	Trial 1	Gold Coast Titans	Kougari Oval	42 – 18	Copley (2), Norman, Lui, McGuire, Frei, Glenn, Reed	Hunt (5)	3,500
Saturday, 19 February	Trial 2	North Queensland Cowboys	Traeger Park	26 – 4	Reed (2), Hoffman, Kahu, Parker	Parker (2), Norman (1)	5,500
Saturday, 26 February	Trial 3	Melbourne Storm	Dolphin Oval	26 – 6	Te'o, Hunt, Lockyer, Yow Yeh, Gagai	Parker (3)	8,000
Legend: Win Loss Draw

=== Regular season ===
==== Result by round ====
Round	1	2	3	4	5	6	7	8	9	10	11	12	13	14	15	16	17	18	19	20	21	22	23	24	25	26
Ground	H	A	A	H	H	A	A	H	H	A	B	A	A	H	H	A	A	B	H	A	H	H	A	A	H	H
Result	L	W	W	W	W	W	W	W	L	L	B	L	W	W	W	L	W	B	W	L	W	W	W	W	W	W
Position	9	4	3	1	2	2	1	2	3	5	5	4	3	4	3	3	2	3	3	4	3	3	3	3	3	3
Points	0	2	4	6	8	10	12	14	14	14	16	16	18	20	22	22	24	26	28	28	30	32	34	36	38	40

Source: NRL 2011 Draw
A = Away; H = Home; N = Neutral; B = Bye; W = Win; D = Draw; L = Loss

Date	Round	Opponent	Venue	Score	Tries	Goals	Attendance
Friday, 11 March	Round 1	North Queensland Cowboys	Suncorp Stadium	14 – 16	Reed, Yow Yeh, Gagai	Parker (1/3)	45,119
Friday, 18 March	Round 2	Canberra Raiders	Canberra Stadium	4 – 20	Hoffman, Gillett, Yow Yeh	Parker (4/4)	16,146
Friday, 25 March	Round 3	Gold Coast Titans	Skilled Park	8 – 14	Glenn, Hodges	Parker (3/3)	20,226
Friday, 1 April	Round 4	Penrith Panthers	Suncorp Stadium	18 – 10	Glenn, Beale, Yow Yeh	Parker (3/5)	25,263
Monday, 11 April	Round 5	Newcastle Knights	Suncorp Stadium	17 – 6	Reed (2), Gillett, Beale	Parker (0/4), Lockyer (FG)	24,522
Saturday, 16 April	Round 6	Sydney Roosters	Bluetongue Stadium	6 – 24	Copley (2), Yow Yeh, Hannant	Parker (4/5)	8,616
Friday, 22 April	Round 7	Wests Tigers	Sydney Football Stadium	18 – 31	Yow Yeh, Glenn, Thaiday, Wallace, Lockyer	Parker (5/5), Lockyer (FG)	19,494
Friday, 29 April	Round 8	Canterbury-Bankstown Bulldogs	Suncorp Stadium	20 – 12	Lockyer, Copley, Beale	Parker (4/4)	30,538
Saturday, 7 May	Round 9	Melbourne Storm	Suncorp Stadium	22 – 29	Beale (2), Reed, Gagai	Parker (3/4)	34,175
Friday, 13 May	Round 10	Penrith Panthers	Centrebet Stadium	33 – 10	Wallace, Parker	Parker (1/2)	11,336
	Round 11	Bye					
Friday, 27 May	Round 12	Manly-Warringah Sea Eagles	Suncorp Stadium	34 – 10	Te'o	Parker (3/3)	32,283
Friday, 3 June	Round 13	Cronulla-Sutherland Sharks	Toyota Stadium	16 – 34	Glenn (2), Copley, Parker, Reed, Beale	Parker (5/7)	14,436
Sunday, 12 June	Round 14	Canberra Raiders	Suncorp Stadium	25 – 24 (golden point)	Glenn, Copley, Beale, Hoffman	Wallace (4/5) & (FG)	21,378
Friday, 17 June	Round 15	St. George Illawarra Dragons	Suncorp Stadium	21 – 14	Yow Yeh (2), Hala, Reed	Wallace (2/4), Lockyer (FG)	34,185
Friday, 24 June	Round 16	South Sydney Rabbitohs	NIB Stadium	16 – 12	Reed, Baptiste	Parker (2/2)	15,371
Friday, 1 July	Round 17	Parramatta Eels	Parramatta Stadium	12 – 16	Gagai (2), Gillett	Wallace (2/3)	11,079
	Round 18	Bye					
Friday, 15 July	Round 19	Gold Coast Titans	Suncorp Stadium	30 – 10	Yow Yeh (2), Thaiday, Hodges, Hoffman	Parker (4/5), Wallace (1/1)	31,035
Friday, 22 July	Round 20	Melbourne Storm	AAMI Park	26 – 6	Yow Yeh	Parker (1/1)	22,912
Friday, 29 July	Round 21	Cronulla-Sutherland Sharks	Suncorp Stadium	46 – 16	Hodges (3), Hannant, Reed, Yow Yeh, Gillett, Wallace	Parker (6/7), Wallace (1/1)	24,164
Saturday, 6 August	Round 22	New Zealand Warriors	Suncorp Stadium	21 – 20	Hodges, Beale, Reed, Gillett	Parker (2/4), Wallace (FG)	37,173
Friday, 12 August	Round 23	North Queensland Cowboys	Dairy Farmers Stadium	16 – 34	Hoffman (3), Reed, Copley	Parker (7/7)	26,463
Monday, 22 August	Round 24	Newcastle Knights	Ausgrid Stadium	6 – 26	Wallace, Hodges, Yow Yeh, Glenn, Hunt	Parker (3/6)	19,412
Sunday, 28 August	Round 25	South Sydney Rabbitohs	Suncorp Stadium	22 – 10	Glenn, Reed, Thaiday, Te'o	Parker (3/4)	40,094
Sunday, 4 September	Round 26	Manly-Warringah Sea Eagles	Suncorp Stadium	18 – 10	McCullough, Yow Yeh, Gillett, Beale	Parker (1/4)	50,859
Legend: Win Loss Draw Bye

=== Finals ===
Qualifying finals
1	Melbourne	18
8	Newcastle	8
2	Manly	42
7	North Queensland	8
3	Brisbane	40
6	New Zealand	10
4	Wests	21
5	St. George Illawarra	12

Semifinals
4W	Wests	20
2L	New Zealand	22
3W	Brisbane	13
1L	St. George Illawarra	12

Preliminary finals
1W	Melbourne	12
New Zealand	20
2W	Manly	26
Brisbane	14

Final
Manly	24
New Zealand	10

Date	Round	Opponent	Venue	Score	Tries	Goals	Attendance
Saturday, 10 September	Qualifying Final	New Zealand Warriors	Suncorp Stadium	40 – 10	Glenn, Reed, Lockyer, Parker, McCullough, Hodges, Beale	Parker (6/8)	48,943
Saturday, 17 September	Semi-final	St. George Illawarra Dragons	Suncorp Stadium	13 – 12	Te'o, Copley	Parker (2/4), Lockyer (FG)	48,474
Friday, 23 September	Preliminary Final	Manly-Warringah Sea Eagles	Sydney Football Stadium	26 – 14	Yow Yeh, Wallace, Copley	Parker (1/3)	31,894
Legend: Win Loss

== Statistics ==
Name	App	T	G	FG	Pts
Scott Anderson	19	0	0	0	0
Kurt Baptiste	4	1	0	0	4
Gerard Beale	27	10	0	0	40
Dane Carlaw	7	0	0	0	0
Dale Copley	17	8	0	0	32
Mitchell Dodds	13	0	0	0	0
Dane Gagai	6	4	0	0	16
Matt Gillett	19	6	0	0	24
Alex Glenn	27	9	0	0	36
David Hala	15	1	0	0	4
Ben Hannant	20	2	0	0	8
Justin Hodges	17	8	0	0	32
Josh Hoffman	16	6	0	0	24
Ben Hunt	19	1	0	0	4
Nick Kenny	9	0	0	0	0
Darren Lockyer	22	3	0	4	16
Dunamis Lui	6	0	0	0	0
Andrew McCullough	26	2	0	0	8
Josh McGuire	18	0	0	0	0
Shea Moylan	1	0	0	0	0
Corey Norman	9	0	0	0	0
Corey Parker	24	3	74	0	160
Jack Reed	27	12	0	0	48
Ben Te'o	14	3	0	0	12
Sam Thaiday	21	3	0	0	12
Shane Tronc	4	0	0	0	0
Peter Wallace	27	5	10	2	42
Jharal Yow Yeh	23	14	0	0	56
Totals	–	101	84	6	578

== Representative honours ==
This table lists all players who played a representative match in 2011.

- (c) = Captain

Player	All Stars	Anzac Test	State of Origin 1	State of Origin 2	State of Origin 3	2011 Four Nations
Gerard Beale	–	–	—N/a	—N/a	—N/a	New Zealand
Alex Glenn	–	–	—N/a	—N/a	—N/a	New Zealand
Ben Hannant	NRL All Stars	Australia	Queensland	Queensland	Queensland	–
Justin Hodges	–	Australia	–	–	Queensland	–
Darren Lockyer (c)	NRL All Stars (c)	Australia (c)	Queensland (c)	Queensland (c)	Queensland (c)	Australia (c)
Corey Parker	–	–	Queensland	Queensland	Queensland	Australia
Jack Reed	–	—N/a	—N/a	—N/a	—N/a	England
Sam Thaiday	–	Australia	Queensland	Queensland	Queensland	Australia
Jharal Yow Yeh	Indigenous All Stars	Australia	Queensland	Queensland	Queensland	Australia

== Honours ==
=== League ===
- Nil

=== Club ===
- Player of the year: Darren Lockyer
- Rookie of the year: Jack Reed
- Back of the year: Darren Lockyer
- Forward of the year: Corey Parker
- Club man of the year: Kurt Richards
