= 2010 Brisbane Broncos season =

Coordinates: 27°27′53″S 153°0′34″E

- NRL rank: 10th
- Play-off result: Did not qualify for finals
- 2010 record: Wins: 11; losses: 13
- Points scored: For: 508; against: 535

Team information
- CEO: Bruno Cullen
- Coach: Ivan Henjak
- Captain: Darren Lockyer
- Stadium: Suncorp Stadium
- Avg. attendance: 35,032
- Agg. attendance: 420,379
- High attendance: 48,516, (North Queensland Cowboys, 12 March)
- Low attendance: 25,178, (Newcastle Knights, 30 April)

Top scorers
- Tries: Israel Folau (20)
- Goals: Corey Parker (69)
- Points: Corey Parker (142)
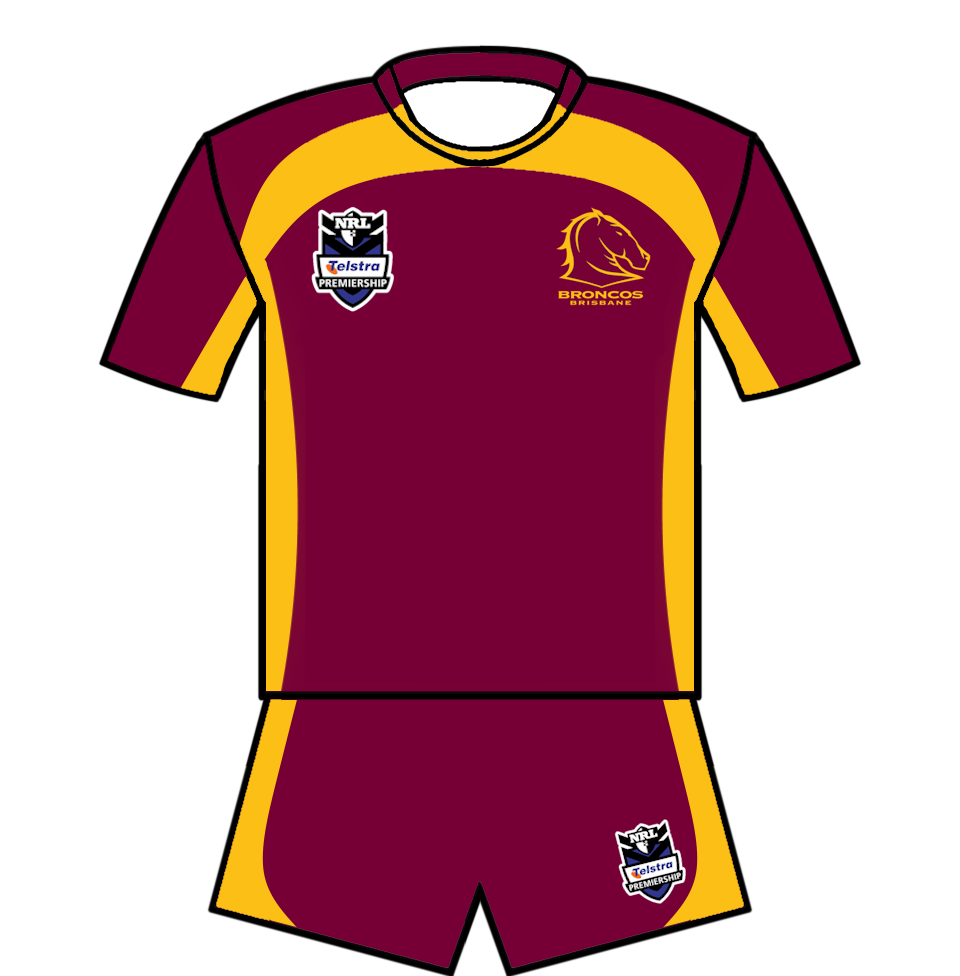
Home colours
← 2009	List of seasons	2011 →

The 2010 Brisbane Broncos season was the 23rd in the club's history, and they competed in the NRL's 2010 Telstra Premiership. Before the start of the season, Brisbane's test centre Justin Hodges damaged an Achilles tendon at training, ruling him out for the entire year. Halfway through the season, the Broncos' other superstar centre Israel Folau announced that he was quitting rugby league at the end of the year to take up Australian rules football with AFL expansion club, Greater Western Sydney. With captain Darren Lockyer missing the last few games of the season due to a rib injury, Brisbane finished the regular season 10th (out of 16), failing to make the finals for the first time since 1991. The Broncos had agreed to terms for another superstar centre, Greg Inglis, to join them for 2011, but he reneged on the deal in the post season.

== Season results ==
The Broncos opened the 2010 season with a nail-biting 30–24 win over Queensland arch-rivals North Queensland Cowboys at Suncorp Stadium. Also for the second year in a row, Israel Folau was the first to score for the season for the Broncos. The Broncos suffered their worst ever loss at home against the New Zealand Warriors with a 48–16 loss at Suncorp Stadium in round 3. In round 9, the Broncos won their first game in Melbourne since 2003 with a 36–14 win over the Melbourne Storm at the newly opened AAMI Park. In round 10, the Broncos celebrated Corey Parker's 200th game in style with a 28–6 win over the Gold Coast Titans at Suncorp Stadium. Brisbane then lost five of its last eight matches after the Origin period, but they did defeat the eventual premiers St. George Illawarra in Round 21.

For the first time since 1991, the Broncos missed the finals finishing 10th after the regular season, the lowest placing position for the Broncos in their 23-year history. For only the second time in Broncos history, they lost more games than they won in the regular season, finishing with an 11–13 win–loss record and equalling the 2007 win–loss record (11–13), both the worst in the Broncos' history.

The Broncos experienced an 11 per cent increase in ticketed memberships from 11,900 in 2009 to 13,239 in 2010.

Fullback Josh Hoffman was awarded the 2010 Paul Morgan Medal for the Broncos' player of the year.

On 11 October Paul Cullen's replacement as CEO of the club was announced as Paul White, a former police officer, who would take up the position in January.

Round	Opponent	Result	Bris.	Opp.	Venue	Date	Crowd	Position
Trial 1	Melbourne Storm	Win	24	12	Browne Park	13 February	4,000	
Trial 2	Canberra Raiders	Win	32	24	Ballymore	20 February		
Trial 3	Redcliffe Dolphins	Win	30	20	Dolphin Oval	27 February		
1	North Queensland Cowboys	Win	30	24	Suncorp Stadium	12 March	48,516	5/16
2	Canberra Raiders	Loss	14	22	Canberra Stadium	22 March	14,200	8/16
3	New Zealand Warriors	Loss	16	48	Suncorp Stadium	28 March	32,338	15/16
4	Sydney Roosters	Loss	6	25	Sydney Football Stadium	2 April	17,106	16/16
5	St. George Illawarra Dragons	Loss	16	34	WIN Stadium	9 April	15,374	16/16
6	Cronulla-Sutherland Sharks	Win	44	16	Suncorp Stadium	18 April	25,688	14/16
7	Canterbury-Bankstown Bulldogs	Loss	18	36	ANZ Stadium	23 April	17,014	13/16
8	Newcastle Knights	Loss	22	30	Suncorp Stadium	30 April	25,178	14/16
9	Melbourne Storm	Win	36	14	AAMI Park	9 May	20,032	13/16
10	Gold Coast Titans	Win	28	6	Suncorp Stadium	14 May	40,168	10/16
11	Bye					21–24 May		10/16
12*	Cronulla-Sutherland Sharks	Win	20	4	Toyota Park	29 May	7,826	8/16
13	Manly-Warringah Sea Eagles	Win	22	6	Brookvale Oval	6 June	11,316	7/16
14	South Sydney Rabbitohs	Win	50	22	Suncorp Stadium	13 June	30,311	7/16
15*	Penrith Panthers	Loss	12	22	Suncorp Stadium	18 June	42,452	8/16
16	Parramatta Eels	Win	10	6	Parramatta Stadium	26 June	15,929	6/16
17	Wests Tigers	Loss	14	16	Suncorp Stadium	2 July	30,127	7/16
18	Bye					9–12 July		8/16
19	Gold Coast Titans	Win	24	10	Skilled Stadium	16 July	26,197	6/16
20	Sydney Roosters	Loss	30	34	Suncorp Stadium	26 July	26,486	9/16
21	St. George Illawarra Dragons	Win	10	6	Suncorp Stadium	1 August	42,269	7/16
22	North Queensland Cowboys	Win	34	26	Dairy Farmers Stadium	6 August	20,148	7/16
23	Parramatta Eels	Loss	14	30	Suncorp Stadium	13 August	38,193	8/16
24	Newcastle Knights	Loss	18	44	EnergyAustralia Stadium	20 August	16,668	8/16
25	New Zealand Warriors	Loss	4	36	Mount Smart Stadium	26 August	21,627	10/16
26	Canberra Raiders	Loss	16	18	Suncorp Stadium	3 September	38,872	10/16

(* denotes game after State Of Origin.)

== Ladder ==
2010 NRL season
Pos.	Team	Pld	W	D	L	B	PF	PA	PD	Pts
1	St. George Illawarra Dragons (P)	24	17	0	7	2	518	299	+219	38
2	Penrith Panthers	24	15	0	9	2	645	489	+156	34
3	Wests Tigers	24	15	0	9	2	537	503	+34	34
4	Gold Coast Titans	24	15	0	9	2	520	498	+22	34
5	New Zealand Warriors	24	14	0	10	2	539	486	+53	32
6	Sydney Roosters	24	14	0	10	2	559	510	+49	32
7	Canberra Raiders	24	13	0	11	2	499	493	+6	30
8	Manly Warringah Sea Eagles	24	12	0	12	2	545	510	+35	28
9	South Sydney Rabbitohs	24	11	0	13	2	584	567	+17	26
10	Brisbane Broncos	24	11	0	13	2	508	535	−27	26
11	Newcastle Knights	24	10	0	14	2	499	569	−70	24
12	Parramatta Eels	24	10	0	14	2	413	491	−78	24
13	Canterbury-Bankstown Bulldogs	24	9	0	15	2	494	539	−45	22
14	Cronulla-Sutherland Sharks	24	7	0	17	2	354	609	−255	18
15	North Queensland Cowboys	24	5	0	19	2	425	667	−242	14
16	Melbourne Storm	24	14	0	10	2	489	363	+126	0^{1}

^{1} Melbourne were deducted eight premiership points and barred from receiving premiership points for the rest of the season due to gross long-term salary cap breaches.

== Scorers ==
Player	Tries	Goals	Field goals	Points
Corey Parker	1	44	0	90
Israel Folau	16	0	0	64
Ben Te'o	9	0	0	36
Matt Gillett	7	0	0	28
Josh Hoffman	6	0	0	24
Peter Wallace	2	5	0	16
Andrew McCullough	3	0	0	12
Darren Lockyer	3	0	0	12
Ben Hunt	3	0	0	12
Jharal Yow Yeh	3	0	0	12
Sam Thaiday	2	0	0	8
Alex Glenn	2	0	0	8
Denan Kemp	1	0	0	4
Dunamis Lui	1	0	0	4
Dale Copley	1	0	0	4
Gerard Beale	1	0	0	4
Corey Norman	1	0	0	4
Lagi Setu	1	0	0	4
Antonio Winterstein	1	0	0	4
Total	66	50	0	364

== Honours ==
=== League ===
- Nil

=== Club ===
- Player of the year: Josh Hoffman
- Rookie of the year: Matt Gillett
- Back of the year: Israel Folau
- Forward of the year: Sam Thaiday
- Club man of the year: Marty Rowen

== Gains ==
Name	2009 club
Denan Kemp	New Zealand Warriors
Scott Anderson	Melbourne Storm
Tim Natusch	Newcastle Knights
Rohan Ahern	Sydney Roosters
Tim Smith	Wigan Warriors
Shane Tronc	North Queensland Cowboys
Ben Hannant	Bulldogs

*Tim Smith later signed the Cronulla-Sutherland Sharks

*Shane Tronc Previous had signed With Wakefield Trinity Wildcats

*Ben Hannant signed for 2011 season and for 4 years

== Losses ==
Name	2010 club
Karmichael Hunt	French Rugby Union (Biarritz Olympique)
David Taylor	South Sydney Rabbitohs
Tonie Carroll	Retired
Aaron Gorrell	Country Rugby League (Queanbeyan Kangaroos)
Will Tupou	North Queensland Cowboys
Joel Clinton	Hull Kingston Rovers
Isaak Ah Mau	North Queensland Cowboys
PJ Marsh	Retired
Steve Michaels	Gold Coast Titans

== 2010 under 20s squad ==
Under 20s squad for the 2010 season:

- James Ackerman
- Mboya Adams
- Kurt Baptiste
- Chris Binge
- Tyson Brookes
- Andrew Clayton
- Kayle Connor
- Dale Copley
- Tennyson Elliott
- Ben Faulkner
- Mitchell Frei
- Louis Frisby
- Dane Gagai
- Ryan Hansen
- Bryce Hegarty
- Jordan Kahu
- Kurtis Lingwoodock
- Benn Malley
- Lachlan Maranta
- Rhys Matsen
- Todd Murphy
- Nathaniel Peteru-Barnett
- Waita Setu
- Korbin Sims
- Tariq Sims
- Aaron Whitchurch
- Josh Williams

== See also ==
- 2010 NRL season
