= Queensland derby =

Rugby League games between Queensland-based NRL teams

- Location: (Australia) Queensland
- Teams: Brisbane Broncos; North Queensland Cowboys
- First meeting: 8 April 1995; Broncos 20–12 Cowboys
- Latest meeting: Saturday 25 July 2026; Cowboys 18–10 Broncos
- Next meeting: TBD
- Stadiums: QE II Stadium; Lang Park; Willows Sports Complex; North Queensland Stadium

Statistics
- Total meetings: 57
- Most wins: Brisbane Broncos (36)
- Most player appearances: Corey Parker (32)
- Top scorer: Johnathan Thurston (204)
- All-time series: Broncos: 36; Drawn: 2 Cowboys: 19
- Largest victory: Broncos 58–4 Cowboys (12 April 1998)

The Queensland derby, known for sponsorship purposes as the XXXX Derby is the series of rugby league matches between National Rugby League (NRL) clubs based in Queensland. Currently there are four NRL teams in Queensland: the Brisbane Broncos, the North Queensland Cowboys, the Gold Coast Titans, and the Dolphins. The Brisbane Broncos are the longest-standing and most successful club of the four.

Two new teams began competing in the New South Wales Rugby League's Winfield Cup competition in 1988. The first of these was the Brisbane Broncos and the second, the Gold Coast Tweed Giants, was technically based in Tweed Heads, New South Wales rather than Queensland but for practical purposes was a Queensland team representing the Gold Coast. Two new Queensland sides, the North Queensland Cowboys and the South Queensland Crushers, entered the renamed Australian Rugby League competition in 1995. The Crushers side folded in 1997 amid the Super League War and the Gold Coast side, after several changes of name, also folded in 1998. The 1998 season was the first of the NRL era; the Queensland Derby was played between the two Queensland NRL sides, the Broncos and the Cowboys, from 1998 to 2007, when a new Gold Coast side, the Titans, entered the competition.

In 2015, the Broncos and Cowboys played in the first all-Queensland grand final, with North Queensland defeating Brisbane 17-16 in golden point extra time to win their first premiership.

In 2023, the Queensland Derby officially became a four-sided contest with the entry of the Dolphins, a national level team associated with the longstanding Queensland Cup side, the Redcliffe Dolphins.

== History ==
=== Early years ===
The Brisbane Broncos entered the New South Wales Rugby League premiership in 1988 alongside fellow Queensland club, the Gold Coast Giants. Under the coaching of Wayne Bennett and led by such players as Allan Langer, Kevin Walters, Glenn Lazarus and Steve Renouf, the Broncos established themselves as Queensland's premier rugby league club in the early 1990s. By the time the North Queensland Cowboys, based in the north Queensland city of Townsville, entered the competition in 1995, the Brisbane side were already two-time premiership winners and perennial finalists.

The first meeting between the two teams occurred in Round 5 of the 1995 ARL season, when North Queensland hosted Brisbane at the Stockland Stadium. The Cowboys, who went into the game in last place, kept the scores level at 4–all at halftime, before star halfback Allan Langer set up three tries and scored one himself to give the Broncos a 20–12 victory. Over the next nine seasons, Brisbane maintained a stranglehold over the fixture, winning 13 of the 15 games played. The lone bright spot for North Queensland were two drawn games in Round 11 1997 and Round 8 1999 (both 20-all). Despite the regular losses, the game was a highlight in the season for North Queensland, regularly drawing crowds of 20,000+ in Townsville.

=== 2004–2010 ===
It would not be until 2004 that the North Queensland side would become a serious threat to the Brisbane Broncos, when the club finished in the top eight for the first time and qualified for their first finals series. North Queensland won their Week 1 finals match, while the Broncos lost theirs, meaning North Queensland would play as the "home" team when the two sides would meet at Sydney Football Stadium a week later. At the behest of both clubs and in accordance with Sydney Football Stadium management, the NRL agreed to move the game to Townsville's Dairy Farmers Stadium. North Queensland won the game 10–0, giving them their first ever win over the Broncos and eliminating them from the finals in the process. The game was Brisbane captain and club legend Gorden Tallis' last, who incidentally was born and raised in Townsville.

The following season, Brisbane would regain control of the derby, winning both games in 2005. That season the Cowboys qualified for their first Grand Final, losing to the Wests Tigers. Between March 2006 and March 2007, North Queensland defeated Brisbane three straight times, including a 36–4 win in Round 1 2006, their biggest victory over Brisbane. Despite North Queensland's success in the derby, Brisbane would go on to win the 2006 NRL Grand Final and record their sixth premiership victory. From July 2007 to 2010, Brisbane would again dominant the derby, winning seven straight games.

=== 2011–2019 ===
North Queensland marked their resurgence as a finals contender in Round 1 of the 2011 NRL season with a victory over Brisbane, their first win over Brisbane in four years. In Round 23 2011, the Broncos won the derby fixture 34–16, in Darren Lockyer's record-breaking 350th NRL game.

In 2012, North Queensland defeated Brisbane three times, a first for either club. In Round 2, they won 28–26 in Brisbane, thanks to a late Matthew Bowen try. In Round 15, they kept Brisbane scoreless in a 12–0 victory in Townsville and on 18 September, the two sides met in the finals for the second time, with the Cowboys eliminating the Brisbane club with a 33–16 win. Cowboys' halfback Michael Morgan scored a hat trick, becoming the first halfback to do so in a finals game. The game was also the last for Brisbane club legend Petero Civoniceva, who retired after 309 NRL games.

The Brisbane side defeated North Queensland in both encounters in 2013 and in Round 2 of the 2014 season recording their longest winning streak in the Queensland derby since 2010. In 2014, the two sides met for the first time outside of the NRL competition, or pre-season trials, in the final of the inaugural Auckland Nines competition. North Queensland triumphed 16–7 to win their first major trophy.

In 2015, the two sides played each other four times, with both clubs coming away with two wins. After splitting the series in the regular season, the clubs met in the finals series for the third time. The Brisbane side prevailed at home, 16–12, in what was called one of the season's best games. Three weeks later the rivals met again in the 2015 NRL Grand Final, the first in history to feature two Queensland-based clubs. North Queensland won the game 17–16 in golden point extra time, with Johnathan Thurston kicking the winning field goal. The loss was the Broncos first in a Grand Final, having won on their six previous attempts.

The match, particularly due to its dramatic ending, was quickly hailed as one of the greatest Grand Finals in rugby league history, drawing comparisons with the 1989 NSWRL Grand Final and the 1997 ARL Grand Final.

=== 2020–present ===
In Round 1 of the 2020 NRL season, the sides faced each other in the first NRL match to be played at the new North Queensland Stadium. Brisbane won the match 28–21 in front of a crowd of 22,459.

In the final round of the 2020 NRL season, Brisbane who were running last had the opportunity to avoid their first ever wooden spoon if they could defeat North Queensland who were sitting in 14th position. North Queensland would go on to defeat Brisbane 32-16 at Suncorp Stadium and condemn Brisbane to the wooden spoon.

Starting from round four of the 2024 NRL season, the man of the match will be awarded the Carl Webb Medal, as a tribute to the forward who represented both clubs in the noughties. Webb died on 21 December 2023, suffering from motor-neurone disease.

== Broncos-Cowboys rivalry ==
=== Head to Head ===
Team	Played	Won	Drawn	Lost	PF	PA	PD
Brisbane Broncos	58	36	2	20	1406	1044	+362
North Queensland Cowboys	58	20	2	36	1044	1406	-362

This table only includes competitive matches, excluding all pre-season and exhibitions matches

=== Regular season ===
This table only shows competitive regular season matches, and not pre-season or exhibition matches.

Date	Round	Home team	Score	Away team	Venue	Attendance
8 April 1995	5	North Queensland Cowboys	12 – 20	Brisbane Broncos	Stockland Stadium	24,855
21 April 1996	5	Brisbane Broncos	58 – 14	North Queensland Cowboys	ANZ Stadium	18,609
5 April 1997	6	North Queensland Cowboys	16 – 42	Brisbane Broncos	Stockland Stadium	30,122
25 May 1997	11	Brisbane Broncos	20 – 20	North Queensland Cowboys	ANZ Stadium	14,167
12 April 1998	5	Brisbane Broncos	58 – 4	North Queensland Cowboys	ANZ Stadium	20,904
8 August 1998	22	North Queensland Cowboys	10 – 22	Brisbane Broncos	Malanda Stadium	30,250
25 April 1999	8	North Queensland Cowboys	20 – 20	Brisbane Broncos	Dairy Farmers Stadium	30,302
11 March 2000	6	North Queensland Cowboys	8 – 50	Brisbane Broncos	Dairy Farmers Stadium	27,643
10 June 2000	19	Brisbane Broncos	6 – 16	North Queensland Cowboys	ANZ Stadium	10,455
17 February 2001	1	North Queensland Cowboys	17 – 18	Brisbane Broncos	Dairy Farmers Stadium	21,729
27 May 2001	14	Brisbane Broncos	50 – 6	North Queensland Cowboys	ANZ Stadium	14,714
16 March 2002	1	North Queensland Cowboys	6 – 24	Brisbane Broncos	Dairy Farmers Stadium	24,212
16 June 2002	14	Brisbane Broncos	52 – 8	North Queensland Cowboys	ANZ Stadium	10,215
5 April 2003	4	North Queensland Cowboys	24 – 32	Brisbane Broncos	Dairy Farmers Stadium	25,242
11 May 2003	9	Brisbane Broncos	38 – 12	North Queensland Cowboys	ANZ Stadium	13,197
17 April 2004	6	North Queensland Cowboys	12 – 19	Brisbane Broncos	Dairy Farmers Stadium	25,986
13 March 2005	1	Brisbane Broncos	29 – 16	North Queensland Cowboys	Suncorp Stadium	43,488
14 May 2005	10	North Queensland Cowboys	6 – 23	Brisbane Broncos	Dairy Farmers Stadium	22,477
12 March 2006	1	Brisbane Broncos	4 – 36	North Queensland Cowboys	Suncorp Stadium	46,229
22 July 2006	20	North Queensland Cowboys	26 – 10	Brisbane Broncos	Dairy Farmers Stadium	24,658
16 March 2007	1	Brisbane Broncos	16 – 23	North Queensland Cowboys	Suncorp Stadium	50,416
13 July 2007	18	North Queensland Cowboys	16 – 24	Brisbane Broncos	Dairy Farmers Stadium	25,926
28 March 2008	3	Brisbane Broncos	36 – 2	North Queensland Cowboys	Suncorp Stadium	50,612
18 July 2008	19	North Queensland Cowboys	18 – 32	Brisbane Broncos	Dairy Farmers Stadium	22,048
13 March 2009	1	Brisbane Broncos	19 – 18	North Queensland Cowboys	Suncorp Stadium	45,022
28 August 2009	25	North Queensland Cowboys	10 – 16	Brisbane Broncos	Dairy Farmers Stadium	24,332
12 March 2010	1	Brisbane Broncos	30 – 24	North Queensland Cowboys	Suncorp Stadium	48,516
6 August 2010	22	North Queensland Cowboys	26 – 34	Brisbane Broncos	Dairy Farmers Stadium	20,148
11 March 2011	1	Brisbane Broncos	14 – 16	North Queensland Cowboys	Suncorp Stadium	45,119
12 August 2011	23	North Queensland Cowboys	16 – 34	Brisbane Broncos	Dairy Farmers Stadium	26,463
9 March 2012	1	Brisbane Broncos	26 – 28	North Queensland Cowboys	Suncorp Stadium	43,171
15 June 2012	15	North Queensland Cowboys	12 – 0	Brisbane Broncos	Dairy Farmers Stadium	20,367
12 April 2013	6	Brisbane Broncos	12 – 10	North Queensland Cowboys	Suncorp Stadium	42,556
26 July 2013	20	North Queensland Cowboys	16 – 18	Brisbane Broncos	1300SMILES Stadium	17,702
14 March 2014	2	Brisbane Broncos	16 – 12	North Queensland Cowboys	Suncorp Stadium	42,203
9 May 2014	9	North Queensland Cowboys	27 – 14	Brisbane Broncos	1300SMILES Stadium	21,340
20 March 2015	3	Brisbane Broncos	44 – 22	North Queensland Cowboys	Suncorp Stadium	40,047
15 May 2015	10	North Queensland Cowboys	31 – 20	Brisbane Broncos	1300SMILES Stadium	24,531
25 March 2016	4	Brisbane Broncos	21 – 20	North Queensland Cowboys	Suncorp Stadium	46,176
20 May 2016	11	North Queensland Cowboys	19 – 18	Brisbane Broncos	1300SMILES Stadium	25,163
10 March 2017	2	Brisbane Broncos	20 – 21	North Queensland Cowboys	Suncorp Stadium	47,703
31 August 2017	26	North Queensland Cowboys	10 – 20	Brisbane Broncos	1300SMILES Stadium	23,321
16 March 2018	2	Brisbane Broncos	24 – 20	North Queensland Cowboys	Suncorp Stadium	46,080
9 August 2018	22	North Queensland Cowboys	34 – 30	Brisbane Broncos	1300SMILES Stadium	19,663
22 March 2019	2	Brisbane Broncos	29 – 10	North Queensland Cowboys	Suncorp Stadium	45,023
8 August 2019	21	North Queensland Cowboys	14 – 18	Brisbane Broncos	1300SMILES Stadium	17,530
13 March 2020	1	North Queensland Cowboys	21 – 28	Brisbane Broncos	Queensland Country Bank Stadium	22,459
24 September 2020	20	Brisbane Broncos	16 – 32	North Queensland Cowboys	Suncorp Stadium	17,174
8 May 2021	9	North Queensland Cowboys	19 – 18	Brisbane Broncos	Queensland Country Bank Stadium	22,222
30 July 2021	20	Brisbane Broncos	37 – 12	North Queensland Cowboys	Suncorp Stadium	29,136
27 March 2022	3	Brisbane Broncos	12 – 38	North Queensland Cowboys	Suncorp Stadium	37,761
2 July 2022	16	North Queensland Cowboys	40 – 26	Brisbane Broncos	Queensland Country Bank Stadium	23,531
10 March 2023	2	Brisbane Broncos	28 – 16	North Queensland Cowboys	Suncorp Stadium	43,162
5 August 2023	23	North Queensland Cowboys	14 – 30	Brisbane Broncos	Queensland Country Bank Stadium	22,659
29 March 2024	4	Brisbane Broncos	38 – 12	North Queensland Cowboys	Suncorp Stadium	45,793
10 August 2024	23	North Queensland Cowboys	18 – 42	Brisbane Broncos	Queensland Country Bank Stadium	24,230
21 March 2025	3	Brisbane Broncos	26 – 16	North Queensland Cowboys	Suncorp Stadium	45,317
30 August 2025	26	North Queensland Cowboys	30 – 38	Brisbane Broncos	Queensland Country Bank Stadium	22,903
10 April 2026	6	Brisbane Broncos	31 – 35	North Queensland Cowboys	Suncorp Stadium	45,582
25 July 2026	21	North Queensland Cowboys	18 – 10	Brisbane Broncos	Queensland Country Bank Stadium	

=== Finals series ===
This table only shows competitive finals series matches.

Date	Round	Home team	Score	Away team	Venue	Attendance
18 September 2004	SF	North Queensland Cowboys	10 – 0	Brisbane Broncos	Dairy Farmers Stadium	24,989
8 September 2012	EF	North Queensland Cowboys	33 – 16	Brisbane Broncos	Dairy Farmers Stadium	21,307
13 September 2014	EF	North Queensland Cowboys	32 – 20	Brisbane Broncos	1300SMILES Stadium	25,120
12 September 2015	QF	Brisbane Broncos	16 – 12	North Queensland Cowboys	Suncorp Stadium	50,388
4 October 2015	GF	Brisbane Broncos	16 – 17	North Queensland Cowboys	ANZ Stadium	82,758
16 September 2016	SF	North Queensland Cowboys	26 – 20	Brisbane Broncos	1300SMILES Stadium	23,804

=== NRL Nines ===
Playing in the NRL Nines does not count as a senior first grade appearance.

Date	Round	Home team	Score	Away team	Venue	Attendance
16 February 2014	Final	Brisbane Broncos	7 – 16	North Queensland Cowboys	Eden Park	-
14 February 2020	Pool 4	North Queensland Cowboys	17 – 11	Brisbane Broncos	HBF Park	-

== Statistics ==
=== Most appearances ===
Player	Team	Games
Corey Parker	Brisbane Broncos	32
Matthew Scott	North Queensland Cowboys	31
Johnathan Thurston	North Queensland Cowboys	31
Darren Lockyer	Brisbane Broncos	29
Sam Thaiday	Brisbane Broncos	28
Alex Glenn	Brisbane Broncos	27
Andrew McCullough	Brisbane Broncos	27
Gavin Cooper	North Queensland Cowboys	26
Jason Taumalolo	North Queensland Cowboys	24

=== Top pointscorers ===
Player	Team	Tries	Goals	FG	Points
Johnathan Thurston	North Queensland Cowboys	6	88	4	204
Corey Parker	Brisbane Broncos	6	57	0	138
Darren Lockyer	Brisbane Broncos	9	27	1	91
Michael De Vere	Brisbane Broncos	3	30	0	72
Jordan Kahu	Brisbane, North Qld	9	12	0	60
Matthew Bowen	North Queensland Cowboys	13	0	2	54
Valentine Holmes	North Queensland Cowboys	3	20	1	53
Jamayne Isaako	Brisbane Broncos	1	23	0	50
Kyle Feldt	North Queensland Cowboys	10	3	0	46
Josh Hannay	North Queensland Cowboys	2	19	0	46

- Most points in a single game:
  - For Brisbane: 18
    - Darren Lockyer (9 goals), Brisbane 58 – 4 North Queensland, Round 5, 1998
    - Ben Walker (1 try, 7 goals), Brisbane 50 – 8 North Queensland, Round 6, 2000
    - Michael De Vere (9 goals), Brisbane 50 – 6 North Queensland, Round 14, 2001
  - For North Queensland: 24
    - Johnathan Thurston (3 tries, 6 goals), North Queensland 36 – 4 Brisbane, Round 1, 2006

=== Top tryscorers ===
Player	Team	Games
Matthew Bowen	North Queensland Cowboys	13
Michael Morgan	North Queensland Cowboys	11
Gavin Cooper	North Queensland Cowboys	10
Kyle Feldt	North Queensland Cowboys	10
Shaun Berrigan	Brisbane Broncos	9
Jordan Kahu	Brisbane, North Qld	9
Darren Lockyer	Brisbane Broncos	9
Steve Renouf	Brisbane Broncos	8
Wendell Sailor	Brisbane Broncos	8
Brent Tate	Brisbane, North Qld	8

- Most tries in a single game:
  - For Brisbane: 3
    - Steve Renouf (3 tries), Brisbane 58 – 14 North Queensland, Round 5, 1996
    - Allan Langer (3 tries), Brisbane 58 – 4 North Queensland, Round 5, 1998
    - Lote Tuqiri (3 tries), Brisbane 50 – 8 North Queensland, Round 6, 2000
    - Shaun Berrigan (3 tries), Brisbane 38 – 12 North Queensland, Round 9, 2003
    - Josh Hoffman (3 tries), Brisbane 34 – 16 North Queensland, Round 23, 2011
  - For North Queensland: 3
    - Johnathan Thurston (3 tries), North Queensland 36 – 4 Brisbane, Round 1, 2006
    - Matt Sing (3 tries), North Queensland 26 – 10 Brisbane, Round 20, 2006
    - Michael Morgan (3 tries), North Queensland 33 – 16 Brisbane, Finals Week 1, 2012
    - Michael Morgan (3 tries), North Queensland 31 – 20 Brisbane, Round 10, 2015
    - Kyle Feldt (3 tries), North Queensland 32 – 16 Brisbane, Round 20, 2020
    - Jeremiah Nanai (3 tries), North Queensland 38 – 12 Brisbane, Round 3, 2022

=== Carl Webb Medal ===
- Patrick Carrigan Round 4 2024
- Kotoni Staggs Round 23 2024
- Payne Haas Round 3 2025

=== Attendances ===
- Highest attendance:
  - Brisbane Broncos at home: 50,612 – Brisbane 36 – 2 North Queensland, Round 3, 2008, Suncorp Stadium
  - North Queensland at home: 30,302 – North Queensland 20 – 20 Brisbane Broncos, Round 8, 1999, Dairy Farmers Stadium
- Lowest attendance:
  - Brisbane Broncos at home: 10,215 – Brisbane 52 – 8 North Queensland, Round 14, 2002, ANZ Stadium (Brisbane)
  - North Queensland at home: 17,530 – North Queensland 14 – 18 Brisbane, Round 21, 2019, 1300SMILES Stadium
- Neutral venue:
  - 82,758 – Brisbane 16 – 17 North Queensland, 2015 NRL Grand Final, ANZ Stadium (Sydney)

== Shared player history ==
When the Cowboys entered the competition in 1995, they had three former Broncos (Jason Erba, Willie Morganson and Paul Morris) in their inaugural squad, with Morganson being the first player to play for both clubs. Cowboys' junior Scott Prince was the first player to play for both clubs in the Queensland derby. Ben Hannant is the first and, so far, only player to win premierships with both clubs (Brisbane in 2006 and North Queensland in 2015). Tariq Sims and Will Tupou both played NYC for the Broncos and later moved to the Cowboys, where they played first grade.

Player	Brisbane Broncos career					North Queensland Cowboys career				
Player	Span	Games	Tries	Goals	Points	Span	Games	Tries	Goals	Points
(New Zealand) Isaak Ah Mau	2008	4	0	0	0	2010–11	5	0	0	0
(Samoa) John Asiata	2021	10	1	0	4	2014–20	128	4	0	16
(Republic of Ireland) Kevin Campion	1998–00	80	9	0	36	2003–04	39	2	0	8
(Lebanon) Michael Coorey	2001–03	7	0	0	0	1996, 98	18	1	0	4
(Australia) Tom Dearden	2019–201	22	2	0	8	2021–present	15	7	0	28
(Australia) Jason Erba	1992	1	0	0	0	1995	5	0	0	0
(Australia) Shaun Fensom	2019	2	0	0	0	2017–18	35	2	0	8
(Australia) Jake Granville	2013–14	10	2	0	8	2015–present	160	22	0	88
(Australia) Paul Green	2004	5	0	0	0	1999–00	35	7	0	28
(Australia) Ben Hannant	2006–08, 11–14	148	12	0	48	2015–16	52	0	0	0
(Australia) Corey Jensen	2022–present	1	0	0	0	2017–21	58	1	0	4
(New Zealand) Jordan Kahu	2013–18, 2020	97	42	145	461	2019	19	1	40	86
(Australia) Patrick Mago	2018	12	0	0	0	2017	2	0	0	0
(Australia) Josh McGuire	2009–18	194	11	0	44	2019–21	38	0	0	0
(Australia) Scott Minto	2002–06	39	12	0	48	2007	14	3	0	12
(Samoa) Tautau Moga	2017	27	10	0	40	2014–16	18	3	0	12
(Cook Islands) Francis Molo	2014–15	6	0	0	0	2018–21	70	6	0	24
(Australia) Willie Morganson	1991–93	18	4	0	16	1995–96	12	4	0	16
(Australia) Paul Morris	1994	4	1	0	4	1995	1	0	0	0
(Australia) Julian O'Neill	1991–95	105	33	169	479	2000–01	47	14	122	300
(Australia) Tom Opacic	2016–18	19	5	0	20	2019–20	24	9	0	36
(Australia) Scott Prince	2001–03, 13	50	8	59	150	1998–01	53	9	17	70
(Australia) Dale Shearer	1990–91	27	15	48	156	1998	13	2	2	12
(Fiji) Ashton Sims	2008–09	56	2	0	8	2011–14	91	2	0	8
(Australia) Nick Slyney	2008, 10	5	1	0	4	2012–13	6	1	0	4
(New Zealand) Robert Tanielu	2002	1	1	0	4	2006	3	0	0	0
(Australia) Brent Tate	2001–07	114	41	0	164	2011–14	67	28	0	112
(Australia) Shane Tronc	2010–11	22	0	0	0	2004–09	125	10	0	40
(Cook Islands) Ben Vaeau	2006	1	0	0	0	2007–08	19	1	0	4
(Australia) Adam Warwick	2000	1	0	0	0	1997–98	13	2	0	8
(Australia) Derrick Watkins	2008	4	0	0	0	2002–03	3	0	0	0
(Australia) Carl Webb	2000–04	66	21	0	84	2005–10	115	16	0	64
(Samoa) Antonio Winterstein	2009–10	47	19	0	76	2011–18	167	78	0	312

== See also ==
- Rivalries in the National Rugby League
