= Tronc (disambiguation) =

Tronc is a brand name that was used by American media company Tribune Publishing from 2016 to 2018.

Tronc may also refer to:

== People ==
- André Tronc (b. 1929), French curler
- Shane Tronc (b. 1982), Australian rugby league footballer
- Scott Tronc (b. 1965), Australian rugby league footballer
- Yves Tronc (b. 1960), French sport shooter

== Other uses ==
- Tronc (gratuity), distribution of tips etc. to staff in the hospitality industry
