= Jack Reed (rugby league) =

England international rugby league footballer

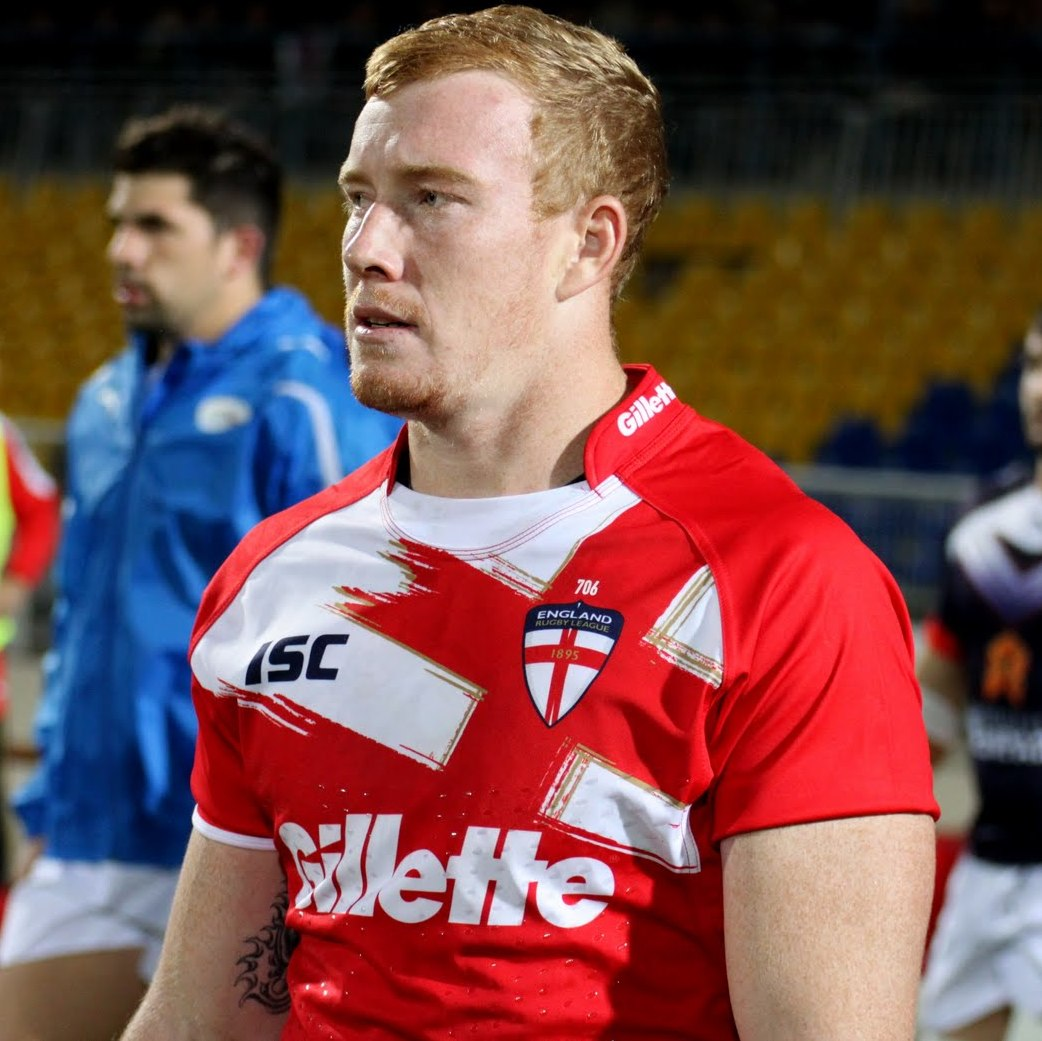

Personal information
- Born: 15 July 1988 (age 38) Silsden, Keighley, West Yorkshire, England

Playing information
- Height: 6 ft 0 in (182 cm)
- Weight: 15 st 6 lb (98 kg)
- Position: Centre
Club
Years	Team	Pld	T	G	FG	P
2011–16	Brisbane Broncos	128	49	0	0	196
Representative
Years	Team	Pld	T	G	FG	P
2011	England	5	3	0	0	12
2012	NRL All Stars	1	1	0	0	4

Jack Reed (born 15 July 1988) is a former professional rugby league footballer who played in the 2010s for the Brisbane Broncos of the NRL. An England international representative, Reed primarily played as a centre. Whilst he was born in England he played his entire junior and professional career in Australia. Reed cited Brisbane legend Corey Parker as a huge influence on his career.

== Early life ==
Reed was born in Silsden, Keighley, West Yorkshire, before moving to Bribie Island, Queensland where he played his junior rugby league with the Caboolture Snakes club and the Bribie Island Warrigals.

== Playing career ==
Reed was then signed up to play for the Canberra Raiders feeder club Souths Logan Magpies. However, after failing to impress at Canberra, he was signed to the Brisbane Broncos, and playing with the Norths Devils in the Queensland Cup.

=== Brisbane Broncos ===
After an impressive 2010 Queensland Cup season with the Norths Devils, Reed was recommended by Norths Devils CEO Mark Murray to take part in Brisbane Broncos pre-season training as part of the feeder arrangement between the two clubs. Reed impressed Brisbane staff with his attitude and work ethic and was rewarded by playing in all three pre-season trials for the Brisbane club.

Just weeks out from the start of the 2011 NRL season, Reed signed a two-year deal with the Brisbane outfit, he made his NRL début in Round 1 against North Queensland at Suncorp Stadium, scoring try in Brisbane's narrow 16–14 loss. At the end of the 2011 Brisbane Broncos season, in which they were knocked out of the finals by eventual premiers the Manly-Warringah Sea Eagles, Reed was named the club's rookie of the year.

Reed was selected in the centre in the NRL All Stars team for the 2012 All Stars match, and scored a try in the 65th minute. Reed suffered a broken leg scare which turned out to be a minor injury which interrupted his 2012 NRL season. Reed played in the 2015 NRL Grand final, scoring a try in Brisbane's golden point extra time defeat by North Queensland. On 7 September 2016, Reed announced his retirement from rugby league due to complications from a shoulder injury.

=== Representative career ===
On 15 September 2011, it was announced that Reed had chosen to represent England, the country of his birth.

Reed started off his England international career in a warm-up test against France before the 2011 Four Nations tournament. He scored a 70-metre try. Reed was then selected to play at Centre against Wales in the 2011 Four Nations, and he again scored a try. Reed once again started in the centre in the 36–20 defeat by Australia at Wembley Stadium where he scored a try. Reed also played against New Zealand which England won 28–6 to reach the final, Reed was at Centre in the 30–8 loss against Australia in the 2011 Four Nations final.

== Statistics ==
Club Career Statistics:

Season	Appearance	Tries	Goals	F/G	Points
2011	27	12	-	-	48
2012	22	7	-	-	28
2013	21	7	-	-	28
2014	23	11	-	-	44
2015	24	11	-	-	44
2016	11	1	-	-	4
Total	128	49	-	-	196

England RL Career Statistics:

Season	Appearance	Tries	Goals	F/G	Points
2011	5	3	-	-	12
2012	-	-	-	-	-
2013	-	-	-	-	-
Total	5	3	-	-	12
