= 2012 All Stars match =

Australian rugby league match

Coordinates: 28°4′1″S 153°22′44″E

2012 All Stars Game
Indigenous All Stars	NRL All Stars
28	36
	1	2	3	4	Total
INDIGENOUS	12	10	0	6	28
NRL	0	12	12	12	36
- Date: 4 February 2012
- Stadium: Skilled Park
- Location: Gold Coast, Queensland
- Preston Campbell Medal: Nathan Merritt
- Attendance: 26,039

Broadcast partners
- Broadcasters: Nine Network
- Commentators: Ray Warren; Phil Gould; Peter Sterling

The 2012 All Stars Match was the third of the annual representative exhibition matches played between the Indigenous All Stars and the NRL All Stars team which was held on 4 February 2012 at the Gold Coast's Skilled Park in Queensland, Australia.

== Teams ==
NRL ALL STARS	Position	INDIGENOUS ALL STARS
Josh Dugan	Fullback	Ben Barba
Jason Nightingale	Wing	Jharal Yow Yeh
Jack Reed	Centre	Greg Inglis
Michael Jennings	Centre	Justin Hodges
Manu Vatuvei	Wing	Nathan Merritt
Benji Marshall (c)	Five-Eighth	Johnathan Thurston (c)
Cooper Cronk	Halfback	Chris Sandow
Kade Snowden	Prop	Tom Learoyd-Lahrs
Aaron Payne^{1}	Hooker	Travis Waddell
Luke Bailey	Prop	George Rose
Nathan Hindmarsh	2nd Row	Sam Thaiday
Adam Blair	2nd Row	Jamal Idris
Paul Gallen	Lock	Greg Bird
Dave Taylor	Interchange	Andrew Fifita
Frank Pritchard	Interchange	Cory Paterson
Jared Waerea-Hargreaves	Interchange	Matt Bowen
Anthony Watmough^{2}	Interchange	Scott Prince
Brent Tate	Interchange	Anthony Mitchell
Luke Lewis	Interchange	Joel Thompson
Nathan Fien^{3}	Interchange	Nathan Peats
Wayne Bennett	Coach	Laurie Daley

^{1} - Cameron Smith was originally selected to play but withdrew due to injury. He was replaced by Aaron Payne.
^{2} - Tony Williams was originally selected to play but withdrew due to injury. He was replaced by Anthony Watmough.
^{3} - Ben Hornby was originally selected to play but withdrew due to injury. He was replaced by Nathan Fien.

== Result ==
4 February 2012
7:15pm (AEST)

NRL All Stars	36 – 28	Indigenous All Stars
Tries: Frank Pritchard (26') 1 Luke Lewis (35') 1 Luke Bailey (45') 1 Josh Dugan (50') 1 Jack Reed (64') 1 Manu Vatuvei (73') 1 Goals: Benji Marshall 6/6 (27', 36', 46', 50', 65', 75')	1st: 0 - 12; 2nd: 12 - 10; 3rd: 12 - 0; 4th: 12 - 6	Tries: Nathan Merritt (19', 38') 2 Jharal Yow Yeh (6') 1 Matt Bowen (29') 1 Greg Inglis (68') 1 Goals: Johnathan Thurston 3/4 (7', 19', 31'); Chris Sandow 1/1 (70')

Skilled Park
Gold Coast, Queensland
Attendance: 26,039
Preston Campbell Medal: Nathan Merritt
Referee: Ashley Klein, Jason Robinson, Phil Haines, Gerard Sutton

== Women All Stars Teams ==
2012 Women All Stars match
Indigenous Women All Stars	Women All Stars
10	10
	1	Total
IND	10	10
WAS	6	10
- Date: Saturday 4 February 2012
- Stadium: Robina Stadium
- Location: Gold Coast, Queensland
- Woman of the Match: Naomi Bobongie
- Advance Australia Fair: TBA

Broadcast partners

The second Women's and Indigenous Women's All Stars match was again held as a curtain-raiser to the men's fixture. Captained by Teresa Anderson, the Indigenous team included Bianca Ambrum, Tash Baggow (Mackay), Candice Clay (Newcastle), Natalie Gala (Bundaberg), Julie Young (Newcastle), Rebecca Young (Newcastle), try-scorers Sarah Sailor and Chloe Caldwell, and player of the match Naomi Bobongie (Proserpine). Renae Kunst captained the All Stars team.

The full team line-ups were originally published by the Australian Women's Rugby League on a defunct website, however, the press release was copied onto and remains on available on a fan forum.

INDIGENOUS WOMEN ALL STARS	Position	WOMEN ALL STARS
Teresa Anderson	Fullback	Tegan Rolfe
Myeisha Saltner	Wing	Jess Palmer
Bianca Ambrum	Centre	Lisa Fiaola
Taleena Simonds	Centre	Ali Brigginshaw
Natalie Gala	Wing	Karina Brown
Bo De La Cruz	Five-eighth	Erin Elliott
Amber Saltner	Halfback	Karyn Murphy
Natasha Baggow	Prop	Heather Ballinger
Naomi Bobongie	Hooker	Natalie Dwyer
Rebecca Young	Prop	Alex Sulusi
Elsja Mosby	2nd Row	Steph Hancock
Iesha Beer	2nd Row	Renae Kunst
Ash Singleton	Lock	Tahnee Norris
Jaylene Chevell	Interchange	Teina Clark
Chloe Caldwell	Interchange	Suzanne Johnson
Sara Hamilton	Interchange	Ruby Ewe
Sarah Sailor	Interchange	Kelli McLean
Eunice Grimes	Interchange
Julie Young	Interchange
Candice Clay	Interchange
	Coach
