= 2015 NRL Grand Final =

Championship game of the National Rugby League season

Brisbane Broncos	North Queensland Cowboys
16	17
	1	2	GP1	Total
BRI	14	2	0	16
NQL	12	4	1	17
- Date: 4 October 2015
- Stadium: ANZ Stadium
- Location: Sydney, NSW, Australia
- Clive Churchill Medal: Johnathan Thurston
- Australian National anthem: Jessica Mauboy
- Referee: Gerard Sutton; Ben Cummins; Brett Suttor (Touch Judge); Steve Carrall (Touch Judge)
- Attendance: 82,758

Broadcast partners
- Broadcasters: Nine Network
- Commentators: Ray Warren Phil Gould Peter Sterling Wally Lewis

The 2015 NRL Grand Final was the conclusive and premiership-deciding game of the 2015 NRL season and was played on Sunday 4 October at Sydney's ANZ Stadium between the Brisbane Broncos and North Queensland Cowboys. North Queensland won the match 17–16 in golden point extra time, claiming their first premiership title in their twentieth year of competition. Due to its dramatic ending, the match has been regarded as one of the greatest grand finals in rugby league history, drawing comparisons with the 1989 NSWRL Grand Final and the 1997 ARL Grand Final. Cowboys co-captain Johnathan Thurston, who kicked the winning field goal for his team, was awarded the Clive Churchill Medal as the best player on the ground. Pre-match entertainment was headlined by Australian rock band Cold Chisel.

== Background ==
The Brisbane Broncos qualified for their first grand final appearance since 2006, and had never previously been defeated in a grand final, winning all six they had featured in – 1992, 1993, 1998, 2000, 2006, and 1997 for Super League. It was Brisbane coach Wayne Bennett's ninth involvement in a grand final after coaching the club in all of their previous grand final appearances, as well as co-coaching the Canberra Raiders to their maiden grand final in 1987 and winning a premiership with the St George Illawarra Dragons in 2010. The North Queensland Cowboys reached the premiership deciding game for the second time since their inception into the competition in 1995, having lost to the Wests Tigers in their first appearance in 2005. It was the second time in history that no New South Wales team featured in the grand final, and the first time that both clubs were Queensland-based. It was the first time that two clubs were captained by Indigenous Australians played in an NRL grand final.

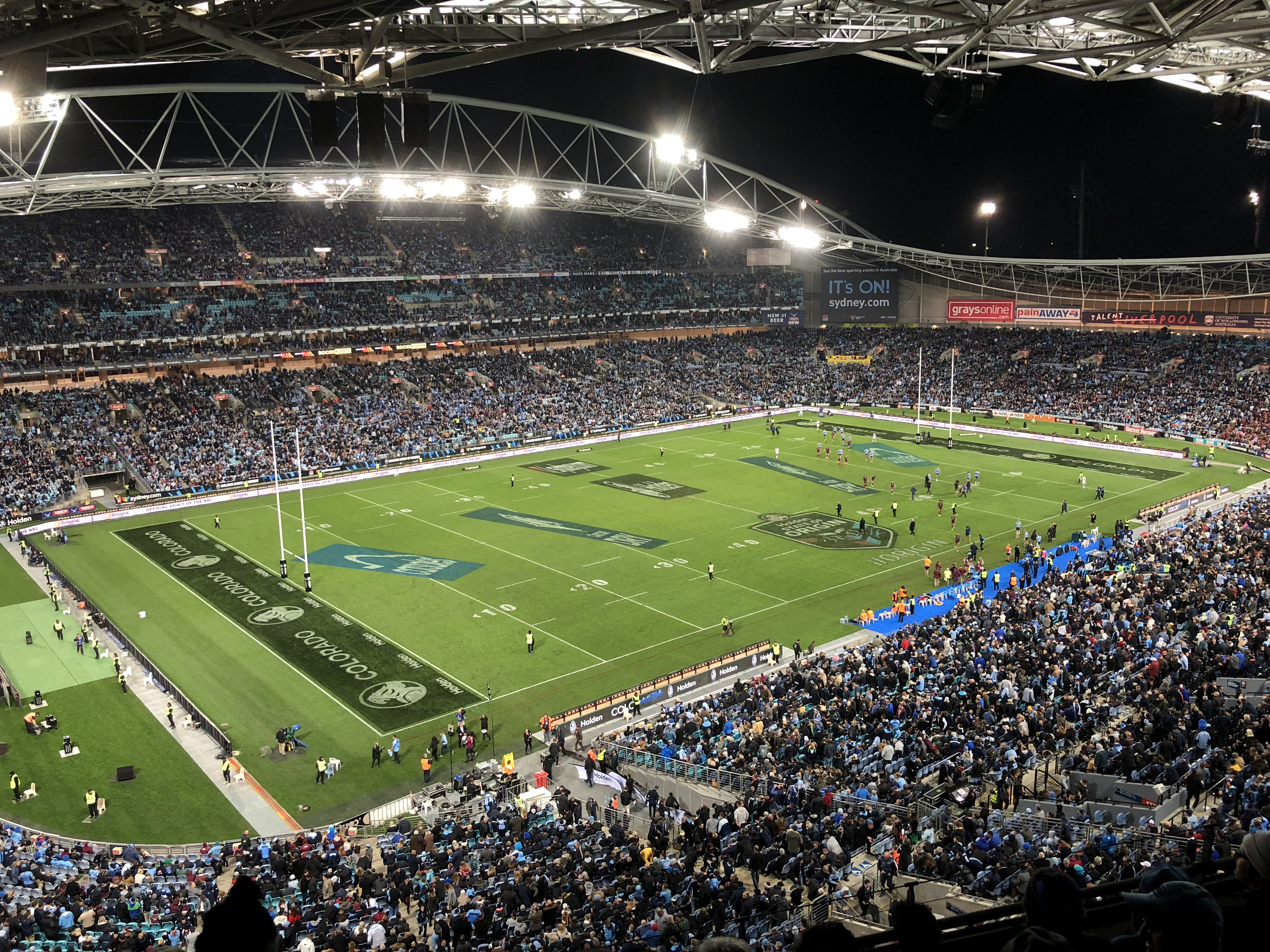
ANZ Stadium, where the match was played

=== 2015 season ===
Brisbane, who finished second in the regular season ladder, and North Queensland, who finished third, faced each other during the first week of the finals series in a qualification game, with the Brisbane side prevailing 16-12 in a tight contest at Suncorp Stadium to earn a week off and the right to host a grand final qualifier. Brisbane defeated minor premiers the Sydney Roosters 31-12 in the preliminary final at Suncorp Stadium to claim the first spot in the grand final. In losing to the Brisbane side, North Queensland were forced to play an extra week in the finals and faced the sixth-placed Cronulla-Sutherland Sharks at their home venue of 1300SMILES Stadium, beating them convincingly 39-0. They then qualified for the grand final after defeating the Melbourne Storm 32-12 in their preliminary final at AAMI Park.

== Teams ==
Brisbane Broncos	Position	North Queensland Cowboys
Darius Boyd	Fullback	Lachlan Coote
Corey Oates	Wing	Kyle Feldt
Jack Reed	Centre	Justin O'Neill
Justin Hodges (c)	Centre	Kane Linnett
Jordan Kahu	Wing	Antonio Winterstein
Anthony Milford	Five-eighth	Michael Morgan
Ben Hunt	Halfback	Johnathan Thurston (c)
Sam Thaiday	Prop	Matt Scott (c)
Andrew McCullough	Hooker	Jake Granville
Adam Blair	Prop	James Tamou
Alex Glenn	2nd Row	Gavin Cooper
Matt Gillett	2nd Row	Ethan Lowe
Corey Parker	Lock	Jason Taumalolo
Jarrod Wallace	Interchange	Rory Kostjasyn
Mitchell Dodds	Interchange	John Asiata
Joe Ofahengaue	Interchange	Scott Bolton
Kodi Nikorima	Interchange	Ben Hannant
Wayne Bennett	Coach	Paul Green

=== Officials ===
Position			Stand-By
Referees:	Gerard Sutton	Ben Cummins	Matt Cecchin
Touch Judges:	Steve Carrall	Brett Suttor	Nick Beashel
Video Referee:	Bernard Sutton		

== Opening Games ==
=== U20s Grand Final ===
Sunday, 4 October
1:35pm (AEDT)

Penrith Panthers U20s	34 – 18	Manly Warringah Sea Eagles U20s

ANZ Stadium, Sydney
Jack Gibson Medal: Soni Luke

=== NRL State Championship ===
Sunday, 4 October
3:45pm (AEDT)

Newcastle Knights	12 – 26	Ipswich Jets

ANZ Stadium, Sydney
Player of the Match: Matt Parcell

== Match summary ==
2015 NRL Grand Final

Sunday, 4 October 2015
19:30 AEDT (UTC+11)

Brisbane Broncos	16 – 17 (g.p.)	North Queensland Cowboys
Tries: 2 Oates 7'; Reed 34'; Goals: 4 Parker pen 6', 9' (2/2); Kahu 35', pen 43' (2/2)	1st: 14–12; 2nd: 2–4; ET1: 0–1; Report	Tries: 3 O'Neill 10'; Tamou 25'; Feldt 80'; Goals: 2 Thurston 12', 26' (2/3); Field goals: 1 Thurston 83'

ANZ Stadium, Sydney
Attendance: 82,758
Referees: Ben Cummins, Gerard Sutton
Touch judges: Steve Carrall, Brent Suttor
Clive Churchill Medal: Johnathan Thurston (North Queensland)

=== 1st half ===
After an even opening five minutes, the first points of the game were scored by the Brisbane side in the sixth minute, when a North Queensland handling error in midfield followed shortly by a penalty allowed Corey Parker to kick a 40-metre penalty goal. The Brisbane side then returned the first tackle after the restart for the opening try of the game, after a late offload on his own ten-metre line from Adam Blair to Anthony Milford allowed Milford to set up a line-break down the left wing, culminating in a try to Corey Oates; Parker converted the try and Brisbane led 8–0. The Broncos then knocked on shortly after the restart, and North Queensland scored its opening try from the ensuing scrum set piece, with Jake Granville breaking the line to set up Justin O'Neill for the try; Johnathan Thurston converted and Brisbane led 8–6. North Queensland nearly scored again three minutes later, with Oates making a try-saving tackle on Kyle Feldt after a pass from Lachlan Coote.

Over the ensuing fifteen minutes, North Queensland had the better of possession and field position. In the 24th minute, attacking from a repeat set which had followed a grubber kick, James Tamou took the first pass out of dummy half and scored under the posts; Thurston converted the try to give North Queensland a 12–8 lead. Brisbane scored an opportunistic try in the 34th minute, when Thurston lost the ball in a tackle in North Queensland territory, and Matt Gillett recovered for Brisbane and broke the line to put Jack Reed over for a try; Jordan Kahu converted and Brisbane regained a 14–12 lead which it took to half time.

=== 2nd half ===
Jordan Kahu kicked a penalty goal in the 43rd minute to extend Brisbane's lead to 16–12. From that point, the game played out as a defensive battle in Brisbane territory. North Queensland had the better of possession and field position, and generated several repeat sets in attack, but were unable to score due to a combination of poor execution and Brisbane's stout goal line defence. Brisbane actively sought to defend its lead, kicking for touch on the sixth tackle throughout most of the second half to wind down the clock and to slow the game down to manage fatigue. North Queensland's two closest opportunities came in the 61st minute, when Kane Linnett dropped a cut-out pass from Thurston which would have seen him score out wide; and in the 64th minute, when fullback Coote was tackled around the legs by Gillett just short of the try line – Coote reached out to put the ball over the line and was penalised for a double movement.

With four minutes remaining, and the ball deep in North Queensland's territory, Ben Hunt conceded a penalty for a dangerous lifting tackle on Linnett, giving North Queensland field position. North Queensland failed to score on the ensuing set; but on Brisbane's following set, Brisbane failed to get to a sixth tackle kick away, after Feldt stripped the ball one-on-one from Hunt at midfield on fourth tackle with one minute remaining. North Queensland attacked, and on the sixth tackle, after a couple of powerful runs from forwards Taumalolo, Tamou and Scott, Thurston received the ball on the left edge, beat a couple of tackles, looked left before floating a pass right to link up with his five-eighth Michael Morgan who ran diagonally right, cut in to draw three Brisbane defenders then as the full time siren sounded, 5 metres out flicked a short outside pass to winger Feldt whom Oates left unmarked providing him the opportunity to score just inside the right corner post to level the match up at 16-16. Jonathon Thurston had a conversion attempt from the right touchline after full time to win the match. He took a long time to compose himself for the kick, however the ball failed to break enough to the left, hitting the right upright half way up and bouncing out, leaving the game tied up at 16–16 and heading into golden point extra time to break the deadlock.

=== Extra time ===
North Queensland kicked off first in extra time, and the opening kick-off was knocked on by Ben Hunt, immediately giving North Queensland an attacking scrum on Brisbane's ten-metre line. North Queensland set up for the game-winning field goal, and after aborting attempts on the first and third tackles due to strong defensive pressure from the Broncos, Johnathan Thurston was able to make up for his missed conversion by slotting the field goal on the fourth tackle from 20 metres out to win the game 17–16. It was the first time an NRL Grand Final had been decided in Golden Point.

=== Post-match ===
At the post-match ceremony, Johnathan Thurston received the Clive Churchill medal as best on ground. This was then followed by the championship ring ceremony and the co-captains holding the Provan-Summons trophy.

Thurston drew praise for his post-match conduct, notably consoling Ben Hunt. Many consider the image of Thurston hugging his daughter to be the 'best image' of the grand final.

== Aftermath ==
Most commentators, analysts and fans rate the 2015 Grand Final as one of, if not the greatest ever played, ranking it alongside the 1989 decider.

Despite this, the golden point conclusion after Hunt's opening error was considered dissatisfying, and it was a key reason for a change of rules made the following year. Since 2016, tied finals have instead been decided by 10 minutes of extra time (five minutes each way) played in full, with golden point used only if still level after 90 minutes.

Both grand finalists, North Queensland and Brisbane, as well as minor premiers the Sydney Roosters, qualified for the second World Club Series, played in the 2016 pre-season against clubs from the Super League.

== See also ==
- Queensland derby
