= Scott Tronc =

Australian rugby league footballer

Personal information
- Born: 15 May 1965 (age 61)

Playing information
- Height: 185 cm (6 ft 1 in)
- Weight: 101 kg (15 st 13 lb; 223 lb)
- Position: Second-row, Prop
Club
Years	Team	Pld	T	G	FG	P
	Souths (Brisbane)
1987–88	Western Suburbs	34	2	1	0	10
1989–90	Brisbane Broncos	21	0	0	0	0
1991–92	Canterbury-Bankstown	30	1	0	0	4
1994	South Sydney	7	0	0	0	0
	Total	92	3	1	0	14
Representative
Years	Team	Pld	T	G	FG	P
1988	Queensland	1	0	0	0	0
- Relatives: Shane Tronc (nephew)

Scott Tronc (born 15 May 1965) is an Australian former rugby league footballer who played in the 1980s and 1990s. A Queensland State of Origin representative forward, he played club football in Brisbane with Souths, winning a premiership with them in 1985, and later the Broncos, and in Sydney with Wests, Canterbury-Bankstown and Souths.

== Playing career ==
Tronc was the winner of the Rothmans Medal (joint with Bryan Neibling) in 1986 while playing for Brisbane Souths.

Tronc played 34 games for Western Suburbs from 1987 to 1988 as a prop forward, before joining Brisbane to play 21 games from 1989 to 1990. He represented the Queensland State of Origin team in one match as a reserve in 1988. In 1991, he joined Canterbury to become a regular member of the first-grade team, playing mostly in the second row. That year, he played in one finals match against Western Suburbs as a replacement.

In 1992, Tronc started the season in the first-grade side but was relegated, with his place going to Gavin Hill. He subsequently became a regular member of the reserve-grade team but was still often used as a first-grade replacement.

In 1993, he coached the Under 21 team but returned to playing when he joined South Sydney in 1994 to play seven games that season, his last in the league.

== Coaching ==
Tronc spent periods as an unaccredited assistant coach at Redcliffe Dolphins and the Brisbane Broncos NYC team.
