= Kurt Baptiste =

PNG international rugby league footballer

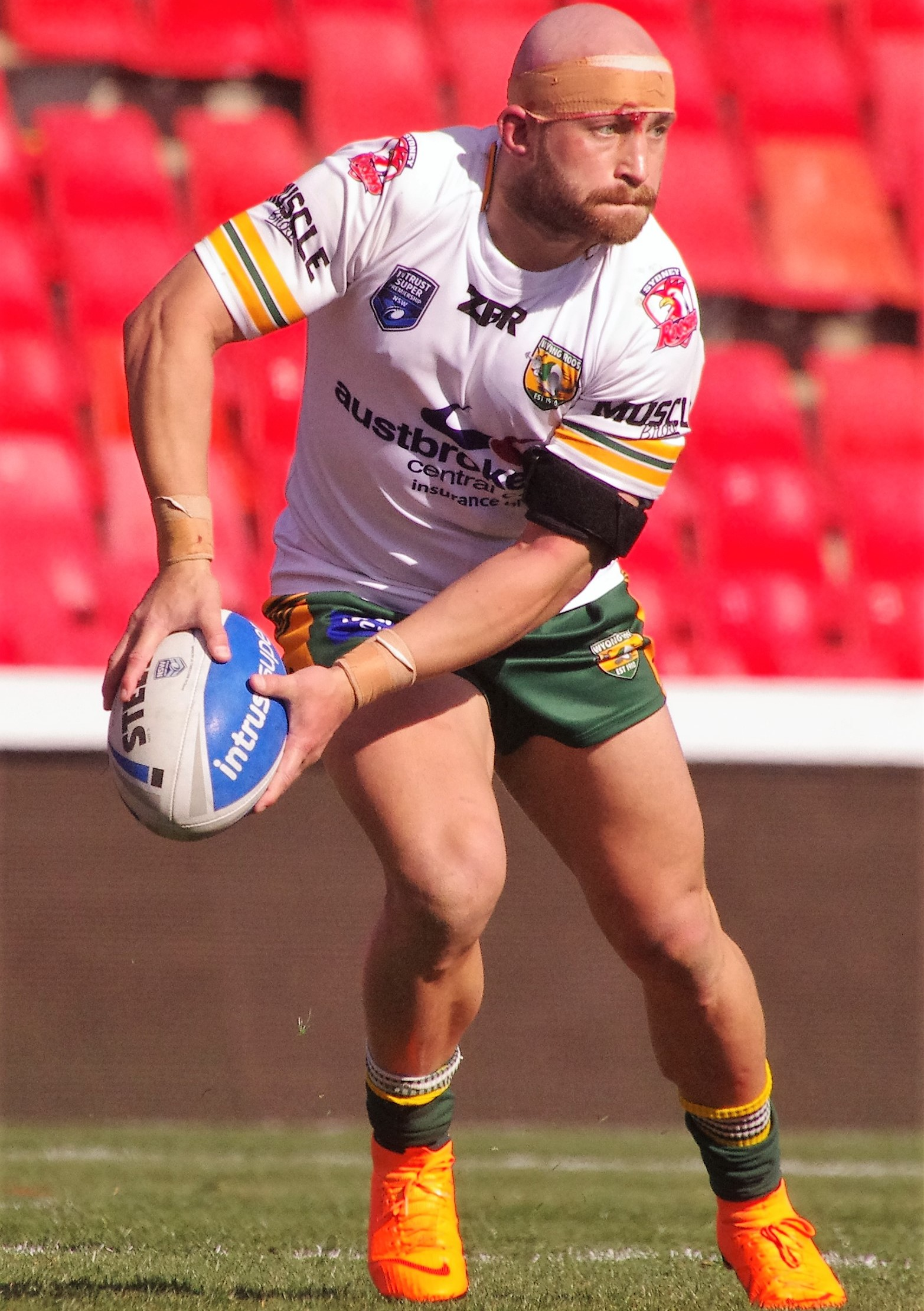

Personal information
- Born: 15 March 1991 (age 34); Brisbane, Queensland, Australia
- Height: 173 cm (5 ft 8 in)
- Weight: 85 kg (13 st 5 lb)

Playing information
- Position: Hooker, Lock
Club
Years	Team	Pld	T	G	FG	P
2011–12	Brisbane Broncos	5	1	0	0	4
2014–17	Canberra Raiders	56	5	0	0	20
2018	Leigh Centurions	1	0	0	0	0
2018	Sydney Roosters	9	0	0	0	0
2019	North Qld Cowboys	9	0	0	0	0
	Total	80	6	0	0	24
Representative
Years	Team	Pld	T	G	FG	P
2012–14	Queensland Residents	3	0	0	0	0
2016–	Papua New Guinea	7	0	0	0	0
- Source: As of 5 January 2024

Kurt Baptiste (born 15 March 1991) is a Papua New Guinea international rugby league footballer who plays as a hooker for the Sunshine Coast Falcons in the Queensland Cup.

He has also previously played for the Brisbane Broncos, Canberra Raiders, Sydney Roosters and the North Queensland Cowboys in the NRL, and the Leigh Centurions in the Betfred Championship.

== Early life ==
Born in Brisbane, Queensland, Australia, Baptiste is of Papua New Guinean descent through his Samarai-born father Bevan. He played his junior rugby league for the Aspley Devils and attended Wavell State High School, where he represented the Australian Schoolboys in 2008, before being signed by the Brisbane Broncos.

== Playing career ==
=== Brisbane Broncos ===
Baptiste played for the Broncos' NYC team from 2009 to 2011, scoring 28 tries in 67 games and being named at hooker in the 2011 NYC Team of the Year. In 2009, he represented the Queensland under-18 team in their 24–6 loss to New South Wales under-18.

In Round 12 of the 2011 NRL season, Baptiste made his NRL debut for the Broncos in their 34–10 loss to the Manly-Warringah Sea Eagles at Suncorp Stadium. He scored the first try of his NRL career in the Broncos' Round 16, 16–12 loss to the South Sydney Rabbitohs in Perth, Western Australia. Baptiste only played 1 game for the Broncos in 2012, in the Broncos' 30–6 win over the Canberra Raiders at Suncorp Stadium, spending much of the season playing for the Norths Devils, one of the Broncos' feeder teams, in the Queensland Cup.

In 2012 and 2013, he played for the Queensland Residents against the New South Wales Residents.

=== Canberra Raiders ===
On 18 November 2013, Baptiste signed a 1-year contract with the Canberra Raiders starting in 2014. On 3 September 2014, Baptiste re-signed with the Raiders on a 2-year contract.

In 2016, Baptiste became a crucial member of the Raiders team, playing in 24 of their 27 matches. On 7 May 2016, he made his international debut for Papua New Guinea against Fiji in the 2016 Melanesian Cup.

On 17 November 2016, Baptiste re-signed with the Raiders on a two-year deal.

In December 2016, Baptiste ruptured his Achilles during pre-season training, which saw him miss half of the 2017 NRL season. He returned in Round 14 of the 2017 season, playing just 11 games for the Raiders. In late 2017, he represented Papua New Guinea at the 2017 Rugby League World Cup, playing four games.

=== Leigh Centurions ===
On 18 December 2017, Baptiste joined English Championship club Leigh Centurions on a one-year deal. On 4 March 2018, after playing just one game for the club, he was granted a release from his contract due to personal and family reasons.

=== Sydney Roosters ===
On 14 March 2018, Baptiste returned to Australia, signing a one-year deal with the Sydney Roosters. In June, he came off the interchange for Papua New Guinea in their 26–14 win over Fiji. He made just 9 appearances for the Roosters during the 2018 NRL season, spending the majority of the season playing for their Intrust Super Premiership feeder club, the Wyong Roos.

=== North Queensland Cowboys ===
On 11 October 2018, Baptiste joined the North Queensland Cowboys on a one-year deal. After missing the entire pre-season and first two rounds due to injury, Baptiste played two games for the Northern Pride, the Cowboys' Queensland Cup feeder club.

In Round 5 of the 2019 NRL season, Baptiste made his debut for the Cowboys in their loss to the Melbourne Storm. Baptiste played just eight more games for the Cowboys in 2019 before tearing his anterior cruciate ligament (ACL) in Papua New Guinea's loss to Samoa in June, ruling him out for the season.

On 13 September 2019, it was announced that he would not be re-signed by the Cowboys. In 2020, he joined the Easts Tigers in the Queensland Cup.

=== Canberra Raiders (second stint) ===
On 4 August 2020, Baptiste re-signed with the Canberra Raiders until the end of the season, following the cancellation of the 2020 Queensland Cup season.

== Achievements and accolades ==
=== Individual ===
- NYC Team of the Year: 2011

== Statistics ==
Statistics are correct to the end of the 2019 season

=== NRL ===
Season	Team	Matches	T	G	GK %	F/G	Pts
2011	Brisbane	4	1	0	—	0	4
2012	Brisbane	1	0	0	—	0	0
2014	Canberra	5	0	0	—	0	0
2015	Canberra	16	2	0	—	0	8
2016	Canberra	24	3	0	—	0	12
2017	Canberra	11	0	0	—	0	0
2018	Sydney Roosters	9	0	0	—	0	0
2019	North Queensland	9	0	0	—	0	0
Career totals		80	6	0	—	0	24

=== Championship ===
Season	Team	Matches	T	G	GK %	F/G	Pts
2018	Leigh	1	0	0	—	0	0
Career totals		1	0	0	—	0	0

=== International ===
Season	Team	Matches	T	G	GK %	F/G	Pts
2016	Papua New Guinea	1	0	0	—	0	0
2017	Papua New Guinea	4	0	0	—	0	0
2018	Papua New Guinea	1	0	0	—	0	0
2019	Papua New Guinea	1	0	0	—	0	0
Career totals		7	0	0	—	0	0
