= Dale Copley =

Australian rugby league footballer

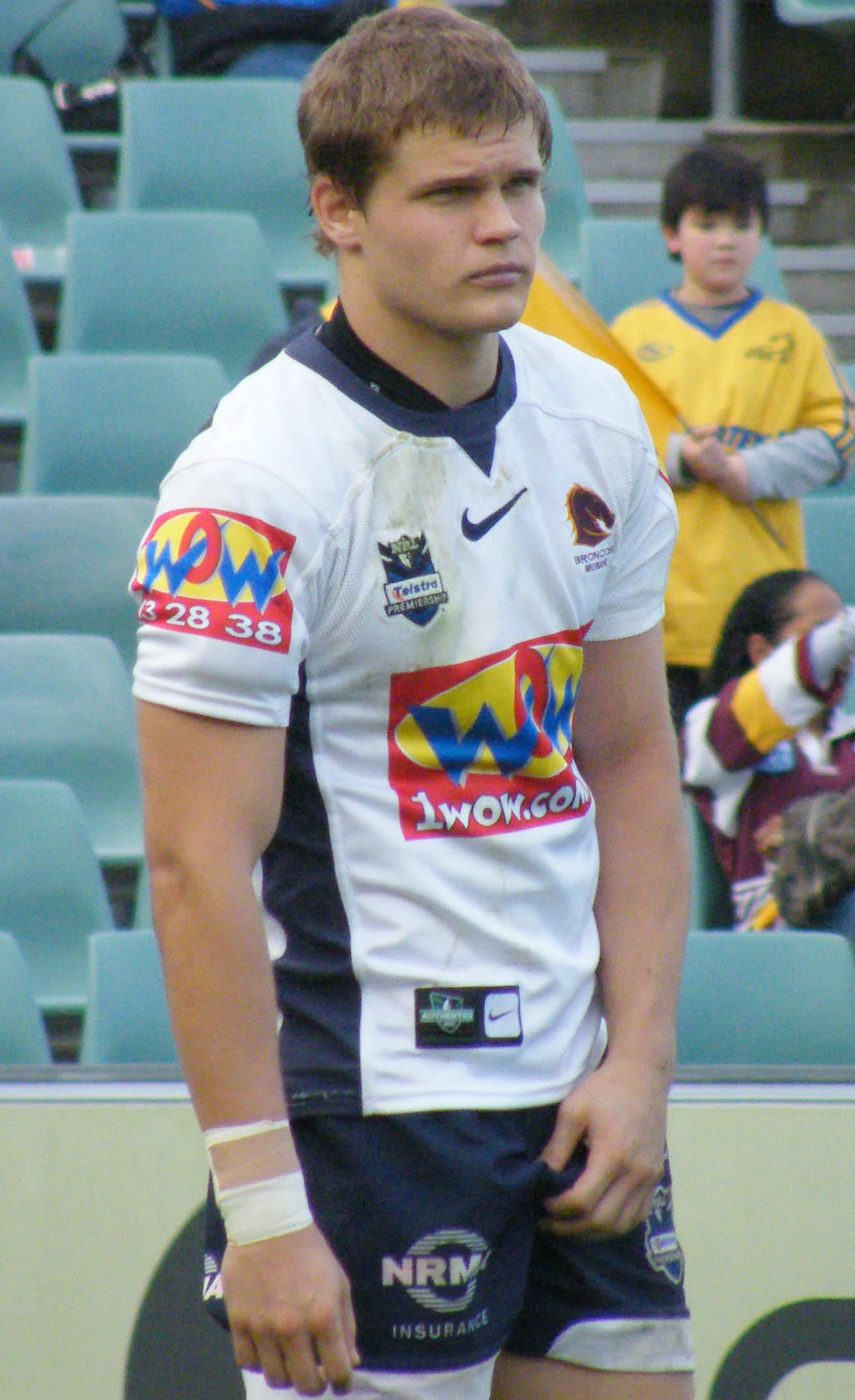

Personal information
- Born: 29 July 1991 (age 35) Ingham, Queensland, Australia
- Height: 184 cm (6 ft 0 in)
- Weight: 95 kg (14 st 13 lb)

Playing information
- Position: Centre, Wing
Club
Years	Team	Pld	T	G	FG	P
2009–15	Brisbane Broncos	72	31	0	0	124
2016	Sydney Roosters	14	5	0	0	20
2017–20	Gold Coast Titans	57	20	0	0	80
2021	Brisbane Broncos	3	1	0	0	4
2021	Sydney Roosters	2	2	0	0	8
	Total	148	59	0	0	236
- Source: As of 2 June 2021

Dale Copley (born 29 July 1991) is an Australian former professional rugby league footballer who last played as a centre or winger for the Sydney Roosters in the NRL.

He previously played for the Brisbane Broncos over two separate spells, as well as the Roosters and the Gold Coast Titans in the National Rugby League.

== Background ==
Copley was born in Ingham, Queensland, Australia and moved to Brisbane at a young age and attended Wavell State High School.

Copley played baseball in his youth and represented Queensland as a teenager. Peter Gahan of the Australian Baseball Federation said that Copley was at one time one of the country's best hitting prospects since Dave Nilsson. Copley was one of the youngest players to ever complete the Major League Baseball Australia Academy Program. Copley chose to quit baseball and focus on rugby the day before he turned 16 years old and Major League Baseball clubs would have been allowed to offer him a contract.

== Playing career ==
He played his junior rugby league for the Aspley Devils before being signed by the Brisbane Broncos. He played in the Broncos NYC between 2009 and 2011.

=== 2009 ===
In round 15 of the 2009 NRL season, Copley made his NRL debut against the Cronulla-Sutherland Sharks at fullback in the Broncos 12–46 loss at Remondis Stadium. In his third first grade match, in round 20 against the Gold Coast Titans at Cbus Super Stadium, he scored his first NRL career try in the corner from a spectacular flick pass from Justin Hodges at dummy half in the Broncos 18–34 loss. Copley playing in four matches and scored two tries his debut season.

=== 2010 ===
Copley played in two matches and scored a try for the Brisbane Broncos in the 2010 NRL season, spending most of the year in Brisbane's NYC team.

=== 2011 ===
Copley finished the Brisbane Broncos 2011 NRL season by playing in 17 matches and scoring eight tries.

=== 2012 ===
After Brisbane winger Jharal Yow Yeh suffered a career ending ankle injury in round 4, Copley replaced Yow Yeh on the wing, playing in 15 matches and scoring four tries for the Brisbane club in the 2012 NRL season.

=== 2013 ===
Copley's 2013 NRL season was ruined by a season ending patella tendon injury in his right knee in the Broncos' first trial match at the Gold Coast Titans at Dolphin Oval in Redcliffe.

=== 2014 ===
On 14 February 2014, Copley was selected in the Brisbane Broncos inaugural 2014 NRL Auckland Nines squad, where they finished as runners-up.

He returned to the Brisbane Broncos first grade team in round 1 against the Canterbury-Bankstown Bulldogs at ANZ Stadium, scoring a try in Brisbane's 18–12 win. Copley finished the 2014 NRL season as the Broncos highest try-scorer with 16 tries and playing in all of the Broncos' 25 matches. On 15 September 2014, he was selected for the Australia Kangaroos Four Nations train-on squad, but didn't make the final squad.

=== 2015 ===
Leading up to the Broncos Queensland derby 2015 NRL Grand Final against the North Queensland Cowboys, Copley was named as 18th man as cover for the retiring Justin Hodges (who waiting at the NRL Judiciary after being placed on report for a lifting tackle). Hodges was later cleared. Copley finished his injury plagued 2015 NRL season with playing nine matches and scoring a try for the Brisbane club.

=== 2016 ===
On 12 January, Copley was selected in the QAS Emerging Maroons squad. On 18 January, he signed a three-year contract with the Sydney Roosters starting "with immediate effect through to the conclusion of the 2018 season", after being released by the Brisbane Broncos to free up salary cap. In round 1 of the 2016 NRL season, Copley made his club debut for the Sydney Roosters against arch-rivals the South Sydney Rabbitohs, playing at centre in the 10–42 loss at the Sydney Football Stadium. In round 3, against the North Queensland Cowboys, Copley suffered a pectoral muscle injury in the Roosters' 0–40 loss at 1300SMILES Stadium and he later missed ten weeks of football. He returned for the Roosters in round 13, against the Wests Tigers, in a 32–16 win at the Sydney Football Stadium. In round 19, against the Cronulla-Sutherland Sharks, Copley scored his first club try for the Roosters in the 20–32 loss at the Sydney Football Stadium. In round 21, against his former club the Brisbane Broncos, Copley played his best match of the season, where he scored two tries and was awarded with the Man of the Match honours in the Roosters' 32–16 win at the Sydney Football Stadium. Copley finished his first year with the Sydney Roosters, with playing in 14 matches and scoring five tries in the 2016 NRL season.

=== 2017 ===
On 15 March 2017, Copley signed an immediate two-year deal with the Gold Coast Titans after being released from his contract with the Sydney Roosters. Copley was to make his club debut for the Gold Coast in round 3 against the Parramatta Eels but was blocked from playing in the match due to him signing with the club two days prior before and not being named in the 21-man squad. He made his club debut a week later in the Titans 26–32 loss to the North Queensland Cowboys. However, he scored two tries in the match.

=== 2018 ===
Copley made 13 appearances for the Gold Coast in the 2018 NRL season as they finished 14th on the table.

=== 2019 ===
Copley made a total of 15 appearances for the Gold Coast and finished as the club's top try scorer in the 2019 NRL season as they endured a horror year on and off the field. During the halfway mark of the season, head coach Garth Brennan was sacked by the club after a string of poor results. The Gold Coast managed to win only four games for the entire season and finished last claiming the Wooden Spoon.

=== 2020 ===
Copley played ten games for the Gold Coast in the 2020 NRL season as the club finished ninth on the table and missed the finals. Copley later signed a contract to re-join one of his former clubs, Brisbane for the 2021 NRL season.

=== 2021 ===
In August, Copley re-joined the Sydney Roosters from Brisbane. In round 22 of the 2021 NRL season, he scored a try for the Sydney Roosters against Brisbane in a 21–20 victory.

The following week, Copley broke his foot during the club's victory over St. George Illawarra and was ruled out from playing for an indefinite period. At the end of the 2021 NRL season, Copley announced his retirement.

== Post career ==
Copley now works as a lawyer at GRT Lawyers.

== Statistics ==
Year	Team	Games	Tries	Pts
2009	Brisbane Broncos	4	1	4
2010	Brisbane Broncos	2	1	4
2011	Brisbane Broncos	17	8	32
2012	Brisbane Broncos	15	4	16
2014	Brisbane Broncos	25	16	64
2015	Brisbane Broncos	9	1	4
2016	Sydney Roosters	14	5	20
2017	Gold Coast Titans	19	5	20
2018	Gold Coast Titans	13	5	20
2019	Gold Coast Titans	15	9	36
2020	Gold Coast Titans	10	1	4
2021	Brisbane Broncos	3	1	4
2021	Sydney Roosters	2	2	8
	Totals	148	59	236
