= Shea Moylan =

Australian rugby league footballer

Personal information
- Full name: Shea Moylan
- Born: 5 June 1987 (age 38) Brisbane, Queensland, Australia
- Height: 182 cm (6 ft 0 in)
- Weight: 89 kg (14 st 0 lb)

Playing information
- Position: Wing
Club
Years	Team	Pld	T	G	FG	P
2011	Brisbane Broncos	1	1	0	0	4
Representative
Years	Team	Pld	T	G	FG	P
2010–11	Queensland Residents	2	0	0	0	0
- Source: As of 5 January 2024

Shea Moylan (born 5 June 1987) is an Australian former professional rugby league footballer, previously playing for the Brisbane Broncos of the NRL. After playing in the Queensland Cup for the Wynnum Manly Seagulls, he made his debut in Round Fourteen of the 2011 NRL season against the Canberra Raiders. Moylan retired at the end of the 2013 season.
