= Kurt Richards =

New Zealand cricketer (born 1987)

Personal information
- Born: 15 September 1987 (age 39); Napier, New Zealand
- Source: Cricinfo, 23 February 2016

Kurt Richards (born 15 September 1987) is a New Zealand cricketer who plays for Central Districts.
