= Mitchell Dodds =

Australian rugby league footballer

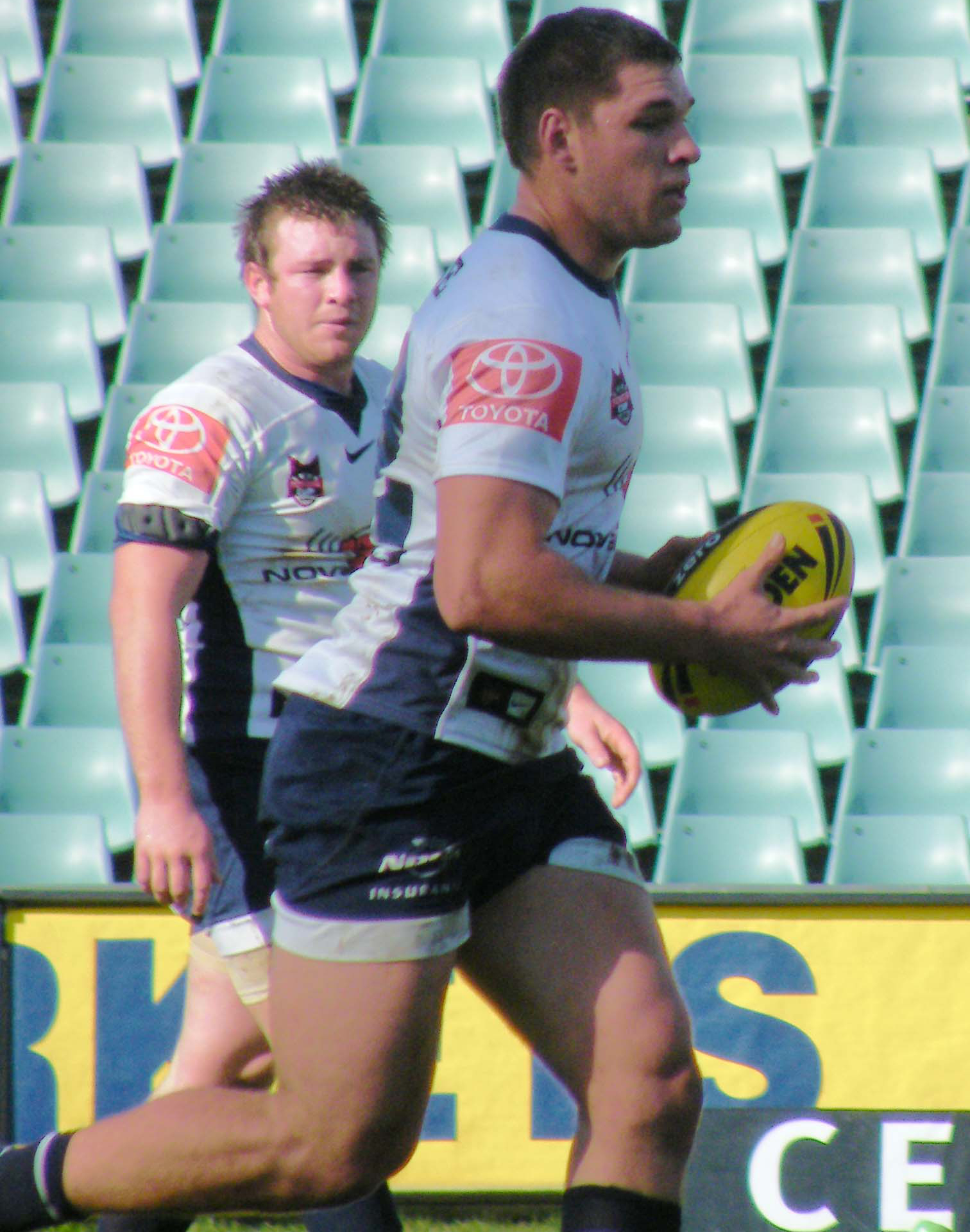

Personal information
- Born: 3 July 1989 (age 37) Brisbane, Queensland, Australia

Playing information
- Height: 189 cm (6 ft 2 in)
- Weight: 107 kg (16 st 12 lb)
- Position: Prop
Club
Years	Team	Pld	T	G	FG	P
2010–15	Brisbane Broncos	76	3	0	0	12
2016	Warrington Wolves	2	0	0	0	0
	Total	78	3	0	0	12

Mitchell Dodds (born 3 July 1989) is an Australian former professional rugby league footballer who played as a prop for the Brisbane Broncos in the NRL and the Warrington Wolves in the Super League.

== Background ==
Dodds completed his schooling at well known rugby union school Iona College, where he played 1st 15 rugby union for Iona in the AIC competition with future rugby league footballer; Jared Waerea-Hargreaves.

== Playing career ==
Dodds played his junior rugby league at Capalaba Warriors, feeder club to Wynnum-Manly Seagulls, playing division 2 football. During his high school years he attended Iona College and played in the first Rugby.

=== 2008 ===
In 2008, Dodds joined the Brisbane Broncos Under 20s side and played in the 2008 Grand Final team which lost to the Canberra Raiders.

=== 2009 ===
Dodds yet again played Under 20s for the Broncos but as well played for Wynnum Manly Seagulls in the Queensland Cup.

=== 2010 ===
In 2010, Dodds made his NRL début against North Queensland starting as a prop, Dodds played every other game that year except in round 4 against the Sydney Roosters. Dodds played 23 games during the season and did not score a try.

=== 2011 ===
He played for the Wynnum Manly Seagulls in the 2011 Queensland Cup when he was not playing First Grade. Dodds played 13 games for Brisbane during the season and did not score a try.

=== 2012 ===
Dodds played 10 First Grade games for the Brisbane Broncos in 2012 and did not score any tries, but his first game did not come until round 13 against Newcastle. Dodds yet again played for Wynnum Manly when he did not play first grade.

=== 2013 ===
Dodds started the season in first grade but then was demoted in round 4 and did not return until round 12. Dodds played 11 games for the Brisbane Broncos and he scored his first NRL try against the Canberra Raiders in round 13, but in round 21 against the Newcastle Knights Dodds suffered an anterior cruciate ligament (ACL) knee injury which ended his season.

=== 2014 ===
Dodds did not play any first grade in 2014 due to an ACL knee injury suffered the previous season in a game against Newcastle.

=== 2015 ===
Dodds played in the Broncos World Club challenge game against Wigan Warriors and then made his return to the NRL in Brisbane's round 1 clash against South Sydney but injured his calf and missed the next three weeks.

Dodds returned to the Brisbane lineup in round 5 and scored two tries against the Gold Coast Titans. In round 8 there were fears Dodds had done his ACL for the third time in less than two years, but it was medial ligament damage.

Dodds returned in round 15 for Brisbane in the win over the Melbourne Storm due to teammate Josh McGuire suffering a season ending Achilles tendon injury the following week against the Newcastle Knights.

In September, it was confirmed that Dodds signed a one-year deal with English Super League franchise, Warrington Wolves. He played for them in the 2016 season. He moved to Warrington with girlfriend Kelsie Mitchell.

=== 2016 ===
On Saturday 12 March 2016, Dodds suffered a double leg break in his tibia and fibula playing against the Catalans Dragons. The Brisbane Broncos re-signed Dodds for the 2017 NRL season but he spent the year in reserve grade before retiring meaning his last NRL game was the 2015 Grand Final.
