= Ben Hannant =

Australia international rugby league footballer

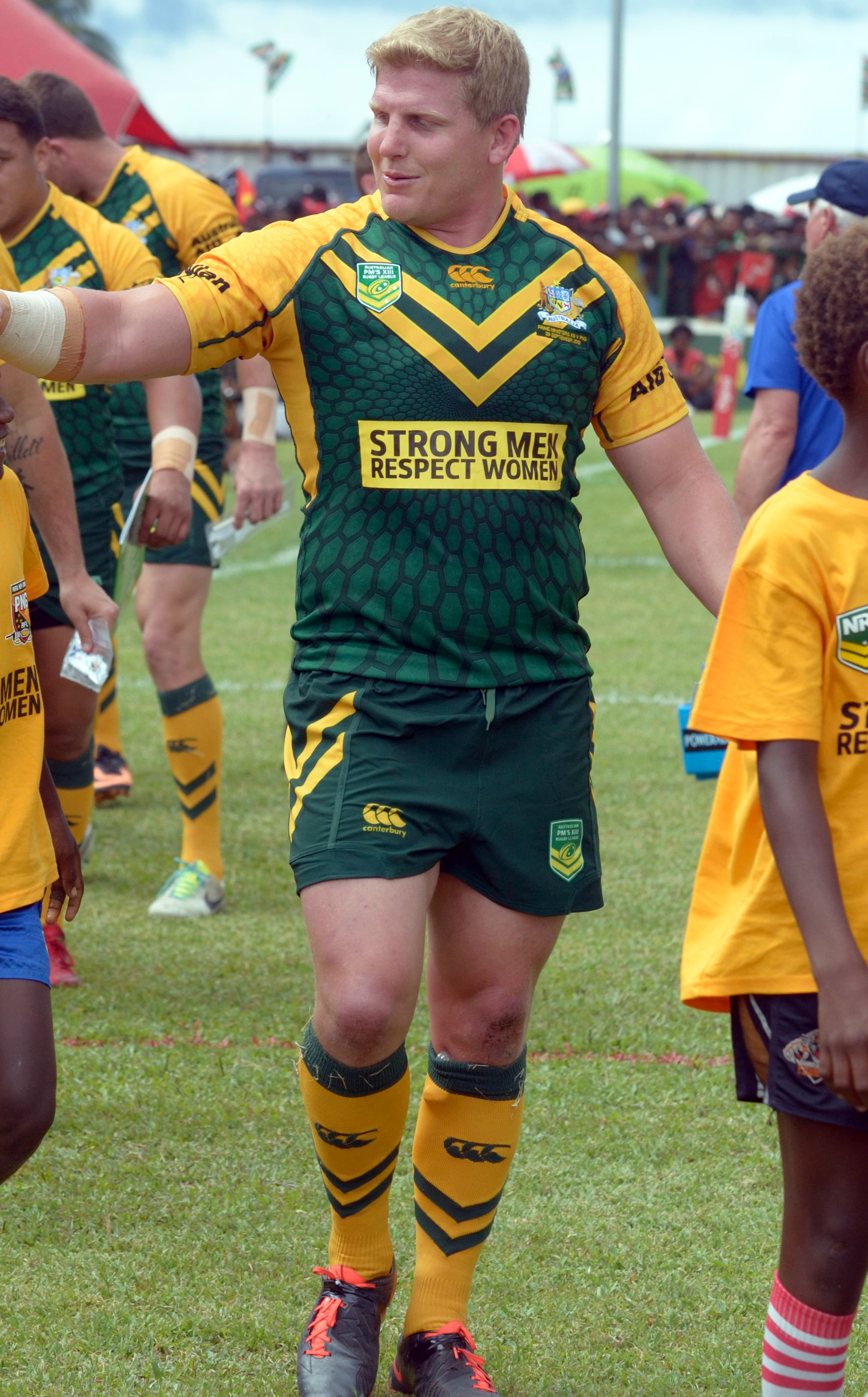

Personal information
- Full name: Benjamin Hannant
- Born: 31 December 1984 (age 41) Burleigh Heads, Queensland, Australia

Playing information
- Height: 184 cm (6 ft 0 in)
- Weight: 106 kg (16 st 10 lb)
- Position: Prop
Club
Years	Team	Pld	T	G	FG	P
2005	Sydney Roosters	8	0	0	0	0
2006–08	Brisbane Broncos	70	5	0	0	20
2009–10	Canterbury Bulldogs	37	3	0	0	12
2011–14	Brisbane Broncos	78	7	0	0	28
2015–16	North Qld Cowboys	52	0	0	0	0
	Total	245	15	0	0	60
Representative
Years	Team	Pld	T	G	FG	P
2008–12	Queensland	12	2	0	0	8
2009–12	Australia	6	0	0	0	0
2014	Prime Minister's XIII	1	0	0	0	0
- Boxing career
- Weight: Heavyweight

Boxing record
- Total fights: 2
- Wins: 0
- Win by KO: 0
- Losses: 2
- Draws: 0

Benjamin Hannant (born 31 December 1984), also known by the nickname of "Polar Bear", is a former Australian rugby league footballer and boxer.

A Queensland State of Origin and Australian international representative prop-forward, he played in the National Rugby League for the North Queensland Cowboys, Brisbane Broncos, Canterbury-Bankstown Bulldogs and Sydney Roosters.

Hannant is a two-time premiership winner and the only player to have won NRL titles with two Queensland teams (Broncos in 2006 and the Cowboys in 2015).

== Background ==
Born and raised on the Gold Coast, Queensland, Hannant played his junior rugby league for the Burleigh Bears. In 2002, while attending Palm Beach Currumbin State High School, he represented the Australian Schoolboys team. As of November 2016, Hannant co-hosts Gold Coast's SEA FM Breakfast show.

== Playing career ==
=== Sydney Roosters ===
Hannant made his NRL debut with the Sydney Roosters in 2005, playing a handful of games for the club. He played in the Roosters' Premier League grand final winning side in 2004 before being signed by the Brisbane Broncos for the 2006 season.

=== Brisbane Broncos ===
In late 2005, Hannant moved to the Broncos for the 2006 season. He went on to play from the interchange bench in Brisbane's victory in the 2006 NRL Grand Final. The retirement of Shane Webcke following the grand final left some large shoes to be filled in the Broncos' front row. As 2006 NRL Premiers, the Brisbane Broncos travelled to England to face 2006 Super League champions, St Helens R.F.C. in the 2007 World Club Challenge. Hannant played from the interchange bench in the Broncos' 14–18 loss.

Hannant was selected for the Queensland Maroons in 2008 and scored his first try in Game 2 at Suncorp Stadium, which Queensland won 30–0. In May 2008, Hannant signed a three-year deal with Sydney-based club, the Bulldogs, commencing in 2009.

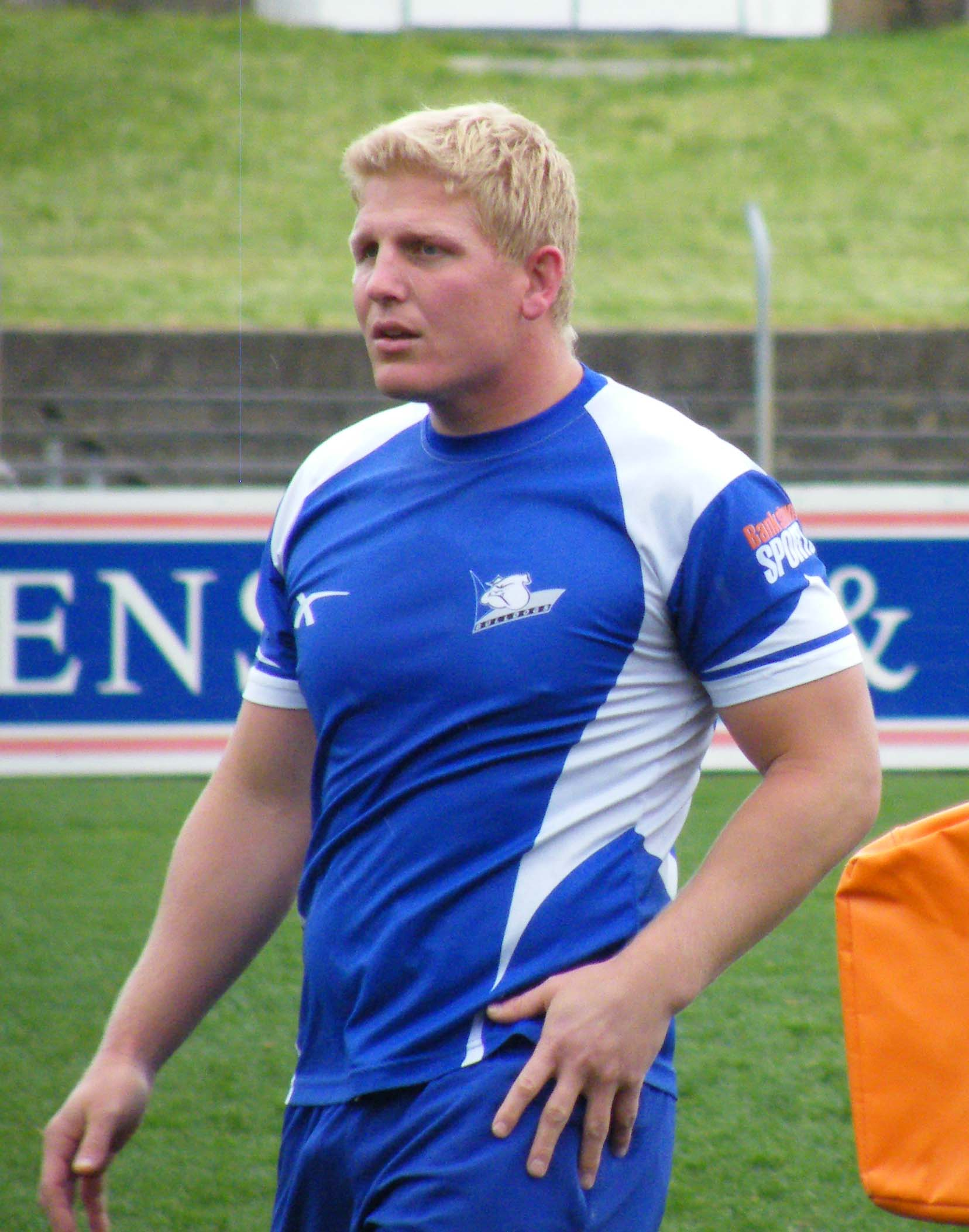
Hannant at training for the Bulldogs in 2009

=== Canterbury-Bankstown Bulldogs ===
On 8 June 2009 it was announced that Hannant had contracted the H1N1 virus, the first case in professional sports Hannant represented Australia on 25 October 2009 in Australia's opening 2009 Four Nations match against New Zealand in which Hannant played as the starting Prop. He also played in the tournament final on 13 November 2009 as the starting prop against England. It was a 46–16 win to Australia. Hannant's 2009 form drew praise from critics with New Zealand Warriors captain and representative prop Steve Price nominating Hannant as the best prop currently playing. On 25 May 2010 it was announced Hannant would re-join the Broncos on a four-year deal starting in 2011 after he was granted an early release by the Canterbury club.

=== Return to the Broncos ===
Hannant missed the start of the 2011 Brisbane Broncos season with a calf injury but returned in round 3 against the Gold Coast Titans. Hannant returned to form after a man of the match display against his former club and was selected in the Australia and Queensland representative teams where he played off the bench. The latter half of the season saw a drop in form for Hannant, resulting in exclusion from the Four Nations series. In 2012, Hannant opened the season strong with a man of the match performance against Parramatta.

=== North Queensland Cowboys ===
On 7 October 2014, Hannant signed with the North Queensland Cowboys on a one-year deal for the 2015 season.

In round 7 of the 2015 NRL season, Hannant played his 200th NRL game in North Queensland's 28–24 victory over the New Zealand Warriors.

Hannant came off the bench for North Queensland in the 2015 NRL Grand Final against the Brisbane Broncos, and played 38 minutes in the Cowboys' 17-16 Premiership win.

On 21 February 2016, Hannant was a member of the Cowboys' World Club Challenge winning side, coming off the bench in the side's 38–4 victory over the Leeds Rhinos at Headingley Stadium.

In November 2016, it was announced Hannant had re-signed with North Queensland on a one-year-contract extension. Two weeks later, on 17 November, he was forced to retire due to a chronic knee injury. Despite the injury and forced retirement, Hannant was quite durable for the Cowboys in his two seasons with the club. Out of a possible 55 games, Hannant played 52 – including the 17–16 win against the Brisbane Broncos in the 2015 NRL Grand Final.

=== Coming Out of Retirement ===
A year after retiring, it was announced he would come out of retirement in 2018 to play for the Burleigh Bears in the Intrust Super Cup. Hannant ultimately played 4 games for the Bears.

=== Achievements and accolades ===
==== Individual ====
- Dally M Prop of the Year: 2009
- Brisbane Broncos Most Improved: 2007

==== Team ====
- 2004 NSWRL Premier League Grand Final: Sydney Roosters – Winner
- 2006 NRL Grand Final:Brisbane Broncos – Winner
- 2015 NRL Grand Final:North Queensland Cowboys – Winner
- 2016 World Club Challenge: North Queensland Cowboys – Winners

=== Statistics ===
==== NRL ====
Statistics are correct to the end of the 2015 season

†	Denotes seasons in which Hannant won an NRL Premiership

Season	Team	Matches	T	G	GK %	F/G	Pts
2005	Sydney Roosters	8	0	0	—	0	0
2006†	Brisbane Broncos	23	0	0	—	0	0
2007	Brisbane Broncos	23	2	0	—	0	8
2008	Brisbane Broncos	23	3	0	—	0	12
2009	Canterbury-Bankstown Bulldogs	18	3	0	—	0	12
2010	Canterbury-Bankstown Bulldogs	19	0	0	—	0	0
2011	Brisbane Broncos	20	2	0	—	0	8
2012	Brisbane Broncos	22	2	0	—	0	8
2013	Brisbane Broncos	16	1	0	—	0	4
2014	Brisbane Broncos	21	2	0	—	0	8
2015†	North Queensland Cowboys	28	0	0	—	0	0
2016	North Queensland Cowboys	24	0	0	—	0	0
Career totals		245	15	0	—	0	60

==== State of Origin ====
Season	Team	Matches	T	G	GK %	F/G	Pts
2008	Queensland	3	1	0	—	0	4
2009	Queensland	2	0	0	—	0	0
2010	Queensland	1	0	0	—	0	0
2011	Queensland	3	0	0	—	0	0
2012	Queensland	3	1	0	—	0	4
Career totals		12	2	0	—	0	8

==== International ====
Season	Team	Matches	T	G	GK %	F/G	Pts
2009	Australia	4	0	0	—	0	0
2011	Australia	1	0	0	—	0	0
2012	Australia	1	0	0	—	0	0
Career totals		6	0	0	—	0	0

== Radio career ==
It was announced on 21 November 2016 that Hannant would be embarking on a radio career in 2017.

Southern Cross Austereo revealed that Hannant would co-present a new breakfast program on Sea FM on the Gold Coast called Get Up with Heather, Dan & Ben.

Hannant will be co-hosting the show with experienced radio announcer Dan Anstey and former The Bachelor contestant Heather Maltman.

Hannant stated that he is likely to be comfortable in a radio show environment, comparing it to a locker room situation where people sit around having a yarn.

== Personal life ==
Hannant is one of 11 children and is a member of the Church of Jesus Christ of Latter-day Saints. Hannant and his wife Emma have eight children, four sons and four daughters. Their eighth child was born in December 2019 named Pippa Elizabeth
