= Shane Tronc =

Australian rugby league footballer

Personal information
- Full name: Shane Tronc
- Born: 19 January 1982 (age 44) Brisbane, Queensland, Australia

Playing information
- Height: 192 cm (6 ft 4 in)
- Weight: 113 kg (17 st 11 lb)
- Position: Prop
Club
Years	Team	Pld	T	G	FG	P
2004–09	North Qld Cowboys	125	10	0	0	40
2010	Wakefield Trinity Wildcats	11	2	0	0	8
2010–11	Brisbane Broncos	22	0	0	0	0
	Total	158	12	0	0	48
Representative
Years	Team	Pld	T	G	FG	P
2006–2011	Prime Minister's XIII	2	0	0	0	0
- Education: Wavell State High School
- Relatives: Scott Tronc (uncle)

Shane Tronc (born 19 January 1982) is an Australian former professional rugby league footballer who played for the Brisbane Broncos and the North Queensland Cowboys in the National Rugby League, and the Wakefield Trinity Wildcats in the Super League.

He previously played for the Redcliffe Dolphins, winning the club's Player of the Year award in 2003 before joining the Cowboys. A nephew of Queensland state of Origin forward Scott Tronc, his father James Tronc played for the Redcliffe Dolphins and the Souths Magpies in the BRL Premiership.

== Background ==
Tronc was born in Brisbane, Queensland, Australia.

== Playing career ==
While attending Wavell State High School in 1999, Tronc was selected to play for the Australian Schoolboys team.

Tronc played at prop forward in the 2005 NRL Grand Final, the Cowboys' first, which they lost to the Wests Tigers.

During a game against the Brisbane Broncos in Round 18 of the NRL competition Tronc suffered a knee injury which required reconstructive surgery, which ruled him out for the rest of the 2007 NRL season.

In July 2009, Tronc signed a two-year deal with Super League club Wakefield Trinity Wildcats from the start of the 2010 season. After seven matches with the Wildcats he asked for a release to return home to Brisbane. Reports at the time linked him with a return to the NRL with the Brisbane Broncos.

Tronc then signed with the Brisbane Broncos until the end of 2010.

In July 2011, Tronc was forced into premature retirement by a debilitating neck injury.

=== Career highlights ===
- 2005 NRL Grand Final - Wests Tigers vs North Queensland Cowboys - Runners-Up
