= 2009 Northern Pride RLFC season =

Northern Pride
Club information
- Full name: Northern Pride Rugby League Football Club
- Nickname: The Pride
- Colours: Teal, Gold
- Founded: 2007
- Website: northernpride.com.au

Current details
- Ground: Barlow Park, Cairns (seating 1,700, standing 15,000)
- CEO: Denis Keeffe (2007–2009)
- Coach: Andrew Dunemann (2008–2009)
- Captain: Chris Sheppard (2008–2010)
- Competition: Wizard Queensland Cup
- 2009: 2nd
Home colours

Away colours

Records
- Premierships: 2 (2010, 2014)
- Runners-up: 1 (2009)
- Minor premierships: 3 (2013, 2014, 2024)

2009 was the second competitive season for the Cairns based CRGT Northern Pride Rugby League Football Club. They were one of 12 clubs that played in the fourteenth season of Queensland's top rugby league competition, QRL's Wizard Queensland Cup.

The readmission of the Sunshine Coast Sea Eagles meant 12 clubs competed. with each club playing 11 home games and 11 away games over 26 weeks between March and August.

The Northern Pride worked through the financial troubles they faced at the end of last season, with the North Queensland Cowboys and NRL partnerships guaranteeing funding. New chairman, Bob Fowler, submitted a revised budget for the 2009 season, noting that the former chairman's financial guarantees to cover any shortfall would not be honoured. QRL Managing Director Ross Livermore and QRL Competitions and Operations Manager Bill Hunter approved the new budget. The Pride trained and operated out of their new home, Pride Oval on Irene Street, Mooroobool, and held their first match there, a pre-season trial against PNG Telikom Sun Engineering Resident Kumuls, attracting over 4,000 spectators. The club launched an email newsletter for members called 'Pride Pulse e-newsletter'.

In order to avoid the Wet season rain and a repeat of last seasons Round 1 mud-bath, the Pride's first two matches were away games. Home games were moved from 6:00 pm to 7:00 pm on Saturdays, and for the first time, a Friday night home match was scheduled on the Queen's Birthday long weekend. The QRL expanded the finals series from five teams to six for the 2009 season.

There was some controversy in Round 9 when Mackay Cutters hooker Roy Baira broke Pride five-eighth Luke Millwood's jaw in a high tackle. Referee Brendon Rose penalised the Cutters and placed Baira on report, but did not send him off. Pride coach Dunneman questioned the referees decision, and later questioned the QRL tribunal after Baira was banned for only four weeks for the offence. The QRL fined the Pride $3,000 for Dunemann's comments.

Although the Pride lost three consecutive games between Rounds 14 and 16, they won four of the last five rounds. They finished in second place with fourteen wins for the season, four points behind the minor-premiers, Souths Logan Magpies, and one place better than they finished last year. Second place meant the Pride got to host their week 1 final game, the first ever home final appearance. There was a scheduling clash at Barlow Park, as rival code CDRU had already booked the ground for their grand final. The Pride agreed to delay kick-off until 8:00 pm, when they comprehensively beat Norths Devils 44-16.

The victory should have allowed the Pride to host the preliminary final, but the match was scheduled to be broadcast on TV and the ABC were unable to make outside broadcasts from Cairns. Despite a petition signed by over 750 Pride players, fans, administrators, local Councillors and MPs wishing to keep the game in FNQ, the TV rights prevailed, and the game was played 1,700 kilometres away in Brisbane in front of a small crowd. Despite the loss of home-ground advantage, the Pride beat Central Comets to reach their maiden Grand Final against newcomers Sunshine Coast Sea Eagles.

The final was played at the Sea Eagles home ground, Stockland Park, with the Sea Eagles fielding nine first-grade players from their NRL feeder club, the Manly-Warringah Sea Eagles. The Pride lost 32–18. A bet between the mayors of Noosa (Sunshine Coast) and Cairns, resulted in the Cairns mayor, Val Schier, having to wear a Sea Eagles jersey to work.

Coach Andrew Dunemann initially signed up for another year as the Pride's coach, but after a chance meeting with NRL's Newcastle Knights coach Rick Stone, he resigned to take up a position as assistant coach under Stone.

A survey conducted by Cumming Economic determined the Northern Pride's economic benefit to the Cairns region in 2009 was $7,000,000.

== 2009 Season – CRGT Northern Pride ==
- Competition: Wizard Queensland Cup
- Sponsor: Cairns Region Group Training (CRGT), three-year naming rights sponsorship.

=== Staff ===
==== Coaches/Trainers ====
- Coach: Andrew Dunemann
- Assistant coach: David Maiden
- Mal Meninga Cup U-18s coach: David Maiden
- Mal Meninga Cup U-18s assistant coach: Cameron 'Spilla' Miller
- Mal Meninga Cup U-18s manager: Joe Maguire
- Cyril Connell Cup U-16s coach: Greg Malenstein
- Cyril Connell Cup U-16s manager: Nathan Woods
- Strength and conditioning coach: Scott Callaghan

==== Captains ====
- Chris Sheppard
- Chey Bird (Round 5)

==== Managers ====
- Operations manager: Chris Sheppard
- Team manager: Rob White
- Office Manager: Sheron McDougall
- Chief executive: Denis Keeffe
- Chairman: Bob Fowler
- Board of Directors: Greg Dowling, Nigel Tillett, Craig Meiklejohn, Bob Fowler.

== 2009 squad ==
The Pride used 36 players this season. Twenty-one players from last year signed with the club again, and three of the Cowboys allocation players from last year were assigned to the Pride again this year. Twelve new players made their debut this season; four were new signings (Rod Jensen, Tom Humble, Chris Riesen and Germaine Paulson), and eight were new Cowboys allocation players (Nick Slyney*, James Tamou*, Clint Amos*, Brandon Boor*, Manase Manuokafoa*, Carl Webb* and Travis Burns*).

Chris Sheppard (c)
Adam Mills
Alex Starmer
Ben Laity
Callan Myles
Chey Bird
Chris Riesen
Drew Campbell
Germaine Paulson
Greg Byrnes
Gordon Rattler
Hezron Murgha
Jamie Frizzo

Jason Roos
Joel Riethmuller
Josh Vaughan
Luke Harlen
Luke Millwood
Mark Cantoni
Noel Underwood
Quincy To'oto'o-ulugia
Richie Marsters
Rod Griffin
Rod Jensen
Tom Humble

Trial

Ben Kerr
John O'Sullivan
Robbie Kyles
Warren Jensen

North Queensland Cowboys allocation

Brandon Boor*
Carl Webb*
Clint Amos*
David Pangai*
James Tamou*
John Williams*
Manase Manuokafoa*
Matthew Bartlett*
Nick Slyney*
Travis Burns*
Ty Williams*

Allocated but did not play for the Pride in 2009:
Aaron Payne
Ashley Graham
Matt Bowen
Scott Bolton
Steve Southern

=== Player gains ===
Player	From League	From Club	Notes
Rod Jensen	English RFL Super League	Huddersfield Giants	
Germaine Paulson	NRL Telstra Premiership	South Sydney Rabbitohs	
Tom Humble	NRL U-20s	NYC North Queensland Cowboys	
Chris Riesen	NRL U-20s	NYC North Queensland Cowboys (CDRL	2007 rookie of the year
Ben Spina	NRL U-20s	NYC North Queensland Cowboys	
Scott Idec	NRL U-20s	NYC North Queensland Cowboys	
Steven Kim	CDRL	Ivanhoes Knights	
Robbie Kyles	CDRL	Edmonton Storm	Trial
John O'Sullivan	CDRL		Trial

=== Player losses after 2008 season ===
Player	To League	To Club
Brett Anderson	NRL Telstra Premiership	Melbourne Storm
Chris Afamasaga	Queensland Cup	Ipswich Jets
Steve Sheppard	CDRL	Mareeba Gladiators
Ryan Bartlett	Injured	
Eric Warria		

==== Cowboys no longer allocated to the Pride ====
Player	To League	To Club
Jackson Nicolau	NRL Telstra Premiership	Gold Coast Titans
Ben Vaeau*	Queensland Cup	Easts Tigers

=== 2009 season launch ===
- Pre-Season Training: 25 November 2008.
- Pre-Season Boot Camp: Echo Adventures, Tully, 31 January–1 February 2009.
- Season Launch:: 12 March 2009, 6.30pm, Centre Stage, Cairns Central Shopping Centre.

=== 2009 player awards ===
25 September 2009, Brothers World of Entertainment, Manunda

- Most Improved Player (sponsored by the CDRL): Nick Slyney*
- Cairns Plan Printing Best Back: Rod Jensen
- Skytrans Airlines Best Forward: Mark Cantoni
- WIN Television Players' Player: Tom Humble
- John O'Brien Perpetual Club Person of the Year: Sheron McDougall
- Skill360 Northern Pride Player of the Year: Tom Humble

==== 2009 Queensland Residents team ====
Rod Jensen
Tom Humble
Mark Cantoni

==== Players signed to first-tier teams ====
Player	To League	To Club
Tom Humble	NRL Telstra Premiership	Parramatta Eels

=== 2009 jerseys ===
2009 Home

2009 Away

=== Trial Matches ===
Charity Cup Challenge

Pre-season Trial 1
Saturday
14 February 2009
17:30 AEST (UTC+10)

Northern Pride	38 – 8	(Papua New Guinea) PNG Resident Kumuls
Tries: Jamie Frizzo 1 Tom Humble 1 Rod Jensen 1 Chey Bird 1 Callan Myles 1 Hezron Murgha 1 Gordon Rattler 1 Goals: Bird 3 Luke Millwood 2	Match Report	Tries: 2 Ham Tee Goals: 0

Pride Oval
(Irene Street, Mooroobool, QLD)
Attendance: Between 4,000~5,000+

CRGT Northern Pride: 1. Chey Bird – FB 2. Gordon Rattler – WG 3. Rod Jensen – CE 4. Jamie Frizzo – CE 5. Josh Vaughan – WG 6. Tom Humble – FE 7. Chris Sheppard (c) – HB 8. Luke Harlen – PR 9. Jason Roos – HK 10. Greg Byrnes – PR 11. Adam Mills – SR 12. Rod Griffin – SR 13. Chris Riesen – LK
Unlimited Interchange: 14. Luke Millwood, 15. Callan Myles, 16. Noel Underwood, 17. Hezron Murgha, 18. Richie Marsters, 19. Quincy To'oto'o-ulugia, 20. Warren Jensen, 21. Ben Kerr, 22. John O'Sullivan.
* = Cowboys allocation.
Unavailable: Germaine Paulson (knee)
PNG Telikom Sun Engineering Resident Kumuls: Joshua Poria, Charles Ongluglo, Anton Kui, Larsen Marabe, Elizah Riyong, Mark Mexico, Geno Kima, Rodney Pora, Opisa Pomba, Nixon Kolo, George Moni, Sigfred Gande, Leonard Otmar, Benjamin John, Ham Tee, Johnson Kuike, Junior Ropra, Dion Aiye.
Coach: Michael Marum (coach of the Rabaul Gurias).

Pre-season Trial 2
Saturday
21 February 2009
19:30 AEST (UTC+10)

Northern Pride	26 – 16	NYC NQ Cowboys U-20s
Tries: Gordon Rattler 2 Matthew Bartlett* 1 Warren Jensen 1 Rod Jensen 1 Goals: Luke Millwood 3	Match Report	Tries: 3 Robbie Daniels; 1 Ben Hanaway Goals: 0

NQ Hardware Stadium
(Atherton, QLD)

CRGT Northern Pride: 1. Richie Marsters 2. Brandon Boor* 3. Rod Jensen 4. David Pangai* 5. Hezron Murgha 6. Quincy To'oto'o-ulugia 7. Luke Millwood 8. Ben Laity 9. Callan Myles 10. Noel Underwood 11. Nick Slyney* 12. Matthew Bartlett* 13. Warren Jensen
Unlimited Interchange: 14. Adam Mills 15. Tom Humble 16. Ben Kerr 17. Robbie Kyles 18. Jamie Frizzo 19. Rod Griffin 20. Gordon Rattler 21. Jason Roos 22. Josh Vaughan.
* = Cowboys allocation.
Unavailable: Chey Bird (hamstring), Luke Harlen (knee), Germaine Paulson (knee).
NYC U-20s Cowboys: Sam Bowie, Mitch Zornig, Steve Eliott, Moses Pangai, Chippie Korostchuck, Ben Cronin, Ray Thompson, Dane Hogan, Michael Morgan, Dylan Smith, Troyden Watene, Chris Faust, Tyson Martin.
Unlimited Interchange: James Segeyaro, Ryan Mahoney, Aiden Day, Ben Morgan, John Koko, Jared Huston, Ben Henaway, Jared Cockburn, Wayne Ulugia.
Coach: Kristian Woolf.

Stockland Cairns Challenge

Pre-season Trial 3
Saturday
28 February 2009
17:30 AEST (UTC+10)

Northern Pride	24 – 18	NQ Cowboys Combined Squad
Tries: Gordon Rattler 3 Callan Myles 1 Joel Riethmuller 1 Goals: Chris Riesen 2	Match Report	Tries: 2 Clint Amos*; 1 Dane Hogan Goals: 3 John Williams*

Barlow Park
(Severin Street, Parramatta Park, QLD)
Attendance: 12,000

CRGT Northern Pride: 1. Chey Bird 2. Germaine Paulson 3. Rod Jensen 4. Hezron Murgha 5. Josh Vaughan 6. Tom Humble 7. Chris Sheppard (c) 8. Ben Laity 9. Jason Roos 10. Greg Byrnes 11. Joel Riethmuller 12. Luke Harlen 13. Chris Reisen
Unlimited Interchange: 14. Luke Millwood 15. Noel Underwood 16. Callan Myles 17. Gordon Rattler 18. Adam Mills 19. Rod Griffin 20. Warren Jensen 21. Ben Hampton*
* = Cowboys allocation.
Unavailable: Chey Bird (hamstring), Luke Harlen (knee), Germaine Paulson (knee).
NQ Cowboys Combined: David Pangai, Moses Pangai, Shannon Hegarty, John Williams, Brandon Boor, Grant Rovelli, Ben Cronin, Dayne Weston, Clint Amos, Matthew Bartlett, Mitchell Achurch, Steve Rapira, Nick Slyney*.
Interchange: Steve Eliott, Dane Hogan, Troyden Watene, Matt Groves.
Coach: Matt Parish.
- Note: Opening game for the Stockland Cairns Challenge NRL pre-season trial match between the North Queensland Cowboys and Penrith Panthers.

=== Wizard Queensland Cup matches ===
ROUND 1: Wizard Queensland Cup 2009

Saturday
14 March 2009
14:00 AEST (UTC+10)4

Tweed Heads Seagulls	30 – 20	Northern Pride
Tries: Shannon Walker 2 David Mead 1 Brenton Bowen 1 Tim Maccan 1 Goals: Ben Jeffery 3 Brad Davis 2		Tries: 3 Rod Jensen; 1 Jamie Frizzo Goals: 2 John Williams*

Ned Byrne Oval
(Cudgen Park, (Kingscliff, NSW)
Referee: Clayton Sharpe
Touch Judges: Justin Eastwood and David Shaw
Video Referee: Tony Maksoud

CRGT Northern Pride: 14. Josh Vaughan – FB 2. John Williams* – WG 3. Rod Jensen – CE 4. Jamie Frizzo – CE 17. David Pangai* – WG 6. Tom Humble – FE 7. Chris Sheppard (c) – HB 8. Ben Laity – PR 9. Jason Roos – HK 10. Greg Byrnes – PR 11. Luke Harlen – SR 21. James Tamou* – SR 13. Chris Riesen – LK
Interchange: 15. Matthew Bartlett*, 16. Nick Slyney*, 19. Germaine Paulson, 20. Rod Griffin.
* = Cowboys allocation.
Unavailable: Mark Cantoni, Alex Starmer, Drew Campbell, Chey Bird (hamstring), Joel Riethmuller (dengue fever).
Tweed Heads Seagulls: 1. Shannon Walker, 2. Ben Jeffery, 3. David Mead, 4. James Wood, 5. Brenton Bowen, 6. Brad Davis, 7. Tim Maccan, 8. Will Matthews, 9. Geoff Holcombe, 10. Michael Henderson, 11. Selasi Berdie, 12. Jake Leary, 13. Ryan Simpkins.
Interchange: 14. Bodene Thompson, 15. Brock Hunter, 16. Tom Kingston, 17. Kingi Akauola.
Coach: Steve Anderson.
- Note: Scheduled to be broadcast live on ABC TV, but the satellite technology was unavailable and the Norths Devils v Sunshine Coast Sea Eagles match from Bishop Park was broadcast instead.
  This was the Pride debut for Rod Jensen, Tom Humble, Chris Riesen, and Germaine Paulson, and North Queensland Cowboys allocation players David Pangai*, Nick Slyney*, and James Tamou* (Pride Players 036–042).

Position	Round 1 – 2009	P	W	D	L	For	Against	Diff	Pts
10	Northern Pride	1	0	0	1	20	30	−10	0

ROUND 2: Wizard Queensland Cup 2009

Saturday
21 March 2009
14:00 AEST (UTC+10)

Ipswich Jets	20 – 28	Northern Pride
Tries: Chris Walker 1 Tyson Lofipo 1 Lorenzo Maafu 1 Paul Stephensen 1 Goals: Scott Ireland 2	Match Report	Tries: 1 Clint Amos*; 1 Rod Jensen; 1 Chris Sheppard; 1 Nick Slyney*; Goals: 6 Tom Humble

Briggs Rd Sporting Complex
(Ipswich, QLD)
Referee: Michael Inman
Touch Judges: Peter Anderson and Justin Eastwood
Interchange Official:Guy Owen

CRGT Northern Pride: 19. Josh Vaughan – FB 2. Germaine Paulson – WG 3. Rod Jensen – CE 4. Jamie Frizzo – CE 5. Hezron Murgha – WG 6. Tom Humble – FE 7. Chris Sheppard (c) – HB 8. Greg Byrnes – PR 18. Clint Amos* – HK 10. Luke Harlen – PR 11. Matthew Bartlett – SR 12. Joel Riethmuller – SR 13. Mark Cantoni – LK
Interchange: 14. David Pangai*, 15. Nick Slyney*, 16. Ben Laity, 17. Noel Underwood.
* = Cowboys allocation.
Unavailable: Chey Bird (hamstring).
Ipswich Jets: 1. Chris Walker, 2. Scott Ireland, 3. Paoa Faamita, 4. Brendon Marshall, 5. Tyson Lofipo, 6. Jeremy Golf, 7. Matt Sharp, 13. Chris Afamasaga, 12. Lorenzo Maafu, 11. Warren Schilling, 10. Ian Donnelly, 9. Ian Lacey, 8. Paul Stephenson.
Interchange: 14. Liam Capewell, 15. Tamati Talanoa, 16. Jacob Ling, 17. Chris Vaefaga.
Coach: Glenn Lazarus.
- Note: This was the Pride debut for North Queensland Cowboys allocation player Clint Amos* (Pride Player 043).
  This was Ben Laity's 25th game for the Pride.

Position	Round 2 – 2009	P	W	D	L	For	Against	Diff	Pts
6	Northern Pride	2	1	0	1	48	50	−2	2

ROUND 3: Wizard Queensland Cup 2009

Saturday
28 March 2009
19:00 AEST (UTC+10)

Northern Pride	19 – 18	Easts Tigers
Tries: Jamie Frizzo 1 Josh Vaughan 1 Tom Humble 1 Nick Slyney* 1 Goals: Tom Humble 1 (1 from 4); Field goals: Chris Sheppard 1	Match Report; Video Highlights	Tries: 1 Kev Stephenson; 1 Liam Campbell; 1 Ryan Cullen; 1 Rickie Dodd; Goals: 1 Matt Lockyer (1 from 4); Field goals: 0

Barlow Park
(Severin Street, Parramatta Park, QLD)
Referee: Michael Inman
Touch Judges: Robert Dalziel and Adam Peut
Interchange Official: Mark Leigh

CRGT Northern Pride: 1. Chey Bird – FB 19. Germaine Paulson – WG 3. Rod Jensen – CE 4. Jamie Frizzo – CE 5. Josh Vaughan – WG 6. Tom Humble – FE 7. Chris Sheppard (c) – HB 8. James Tamou* – PR 9. Callan Myles – HK 10. Luke Harlen – PR 11. Nick Slyney* – SR 12. Joel Riethmuller – SR 13. Mark Cantoni – LK
Interchange: 14. David Pangai, 15. Matthew Bartlett*, 16. Ben Laity, 17. Greg Byrnes.
* = Cowboys allocation.
Easts Tigers: 1. Ryan Cullen, 2. Kev Stephensen, 3. Liam Campbell, 4. Wade Liddell, 5. Joe Richards, 6. Matt Lockyer, 7. Dane Phillips, 13. Albert Talipeau, 12. Mark Offerdahl, 11. Thomas Macgougan, 10. Isaak Ah Mau, 9. Trent Young, 8. Ben Vaeau.
Interchange: 14. Matt Cameron, 15. Chris Bamford, 16. Charles Tonga, 17. Marcus Jensen.
Coach: Darren Smith.

Position	Round 3 – 2009	P	W	D	L	For	Against	Diff	Pts
7	Northern Pride	3	2	0	1	67	68	−1	4

ROUND 4: Wizard Queensland Cup 2009

Saturday
4 April 2009
19:00 AEST (UTC+10)

Northern Pride	14 – 16	Sunshine Coast Sea Eagles
Tries: Brandon Boor* 1 Josh Vaughan 1 David Pangai* 1 Goals: Chey Bird 1	Match Report; Video Highlights	Tries: 2 Trent Hodkinson; 1 Rob Godfrey Goals: 2 Trent Hodkinson

Barlow Park
(Severin Street, Parramatta Park, QLD)
Referee: Nick Kalpakidis
Touch Judges: Robert Dalziel and Adam Peut
Interchange Official: Daniel Caamano

CRGT Northern Pride: 1. Chey Bird – FB 2. Brandon Boor* – WG 3. Rod Jensen – CE 4. Jamie Frizzo – CE 5. Josh Vaughan – WG 18. Chris Riesen – FE 6. Tom Humble – FE 8. James Tamou* – PR 9. Callan Myles – HK 10. Luke Harlen – PR 11. Nick Slyney* – SR 12. Joel Riethmuller – SR 13. Mark Cantoni – LK
Interchange: 14. David Pangai*, 15. Matthew Bartlett*, 17. Greg Byrnes, 20. Manase Manuokafoa*.
* = Cowboys allocation. Seven Cowboys played in this game, all four players on the interchange bench were Cowboys.
Unavailable: Chris Sheppard (hamstring), Luke Millwood (broken jaw).
Sunshine Coast Sea Eagles: 1. Howie Matthews, 2. Hayden Fisher, 3. Robinson Godfrey, 4. Ryan Walker, 5. Michael Chapman, 6. Jack Pearson, 7. Trent Hodkinson, 13. Jon Muir, 12. Jon Grieve, 11. Steve Mcphee, 10. Vic Mauro, 9. Cameron Joyce, 8. Phil Morwood.
Interchange: 14. Junior Palau, 15. Kris Boyce, 16. Matt Mannion, 17. Julien Rinaldi.
Coach: Brandon Costin.
- Note: This was the Pride debut for North Queensland Cowboys allocation players Brandon Boor* and Manase Manuokafoa* (Pride Players 044 & 045).

Position	Round 4 – 2009	P	W	D	L	For	Against	Diff	Pts
7	Northern Pride	4	2	0	2	81	84	−3	4

ROUND 5: Wizard Queensland Cup 2009

Saturday
11 April 2009
14:00 AEST (UTC+10)

Burleigh Bears	30 – 10	Northern Pride
Tries: Adam Fielder 3 Joel Rapana 1 Kaine Manihera 1 Robert Apanui 1 Goals: Nick Parfitt 3	Match Report	Tries: 1 Mark Cantoni; 1 Nick Slyney* Goals: 1 Chey Bird

Pizzey Park
(Miami, Gold Coast, QLD)
Broadcast live on ABC 1 TV
Referee: Clayton Sharpe.
Touch Judges: Shane Spicer and Glenn Richardson.
Interchange Official: Gavin Adams.
Video Referee: Tony Maksoud.

CRGT Northern Pride: 1. Josh Vaughan – FB 18. Ty Williams* – WG 3. Rod Jensen – CE 4. Jamie Frizzo – CE 5. Hezron Murgha – WG 6. Tom Humble – FE 7. Chey Bird (c) – HB 8. Manase Manuokafoa* – PR 9. Jason Roos – HK 10. Luke Harlen* – PR 11. Nick Slyney* – SR 12. Mark Cantoni – SR 13. Joel Riethmuller – LK
Interchange: 16. Greg Byrnes, 17. Ben Laity, 2. Brandon Boor*, 20. James Tamou*.
* = Cowboys allocation.
Unavailable: Chris Sheppard (hamstring).
Burleigh Bears: 1. Nick Parfitt, 2. Joel Rapana, 3. Adam Fielder, 4. Daniel Isaac, 5. Kaine Manihera, 6. Jacob Fauid, 7. Brent Mcconnell, 13. Matt Pow, 12. Tanu Wulf, 11. Robert Apanui, 10. Pele Peletelese, 9. Scott Smith (c), 8. Brett O Farrell.
Interchange: 14. Aaron Sweeney, 15. Ryan Wilson, 16. Kale Burton, 17. Marty Paulson.
Coach: Jim Lenihan.
- Note: Broadcast live on ABC 1 TV with ABC Sport's Gerry Collins, Warren Boland and David Wright.
  Burleigh Bears wore pink jerseys for breast cancer research.

Position	Round 5 – 2009	P	W	D	L	For	Against	Diff	Pts
8	Northern Pride	5	2	0	3	91	114	−23	4

ROUND 6: Wizard Queensland Cup 2009

Saturday
18 April 2009
19:00 AEST (UTC+10)

Northern Pride	30 – 12	Wynnum Manly Seagulls
Tries: John Williams* 2 Chey Bird 1 Brandon Boor* 1 Ty Williams* 1 Mark Cantoni 1 Goals: Chey Bird 3	Match Report; Video Highlights	Tries: 1 Gerard Beale; 1 Chris Currie Goals: 2 Matt Seamark

Barlow Park
(Severin Street, Parramatta Park, QLD)
Referee: Justin Davis
Touch Judges: Michael Inman and Daniel Caamano
Interchange Official: Rob Dalziel

CRGT/Skill360 Northern Pride: 1. Chey Bird – FB 2. Brandon Boor* – WG 3. Ty Williams* – CE 4. Hezron Murgha – CE 5. John Williams* – WG 6. Tom Humble – FE 19. Chris Sheppard (c) – HB 8. Ben Laity – PR 9. Jason Roos – HK 10. Carl Webb* – PR 11. James Tamou* – SR 12. Mark Cantoni – SR 13. Joel Riethmuller – LK
Interchange: 14. Rod Jensen, 15. Nick Slyney*, 16. Alex Starmer, 17. Noel Underwood.
* = Cowboys allocation.
Wynnum-Manly Seagulls: 1. Simon Phillips, 2. Shaun Daylight, 3. Jason Moon, 4. Gerard Beale, 5. Chris Currie, 6. Ben Green, 7. Matt Seamark, 13. Adam Brideson, 12. Darren Bain, 11. Luke Dalziel Don, 10. Chris Muckert, 9. Aoterangi Herangi, 8. Jason Williams.
Interchange: 14. Leon Panapa, 15. Nathan Beckett, 16. Brett Thomas, 17. Lachlan Morgan.
Coach: Shane Mcnally.
- Note: Pride sponsors CRGT became Skill360.
  North Queensland Cowboys players Carl Webb* and John Williams* were dropped from this week's first grade match against Cronulla Sharks for disciplinary reasons (missing training) and played for the Pride.
  This was the Pride debut for Carl Webb* (Player 046).

Position	Round 6 – 2009	P	W	D	L	For	Against	Diff	Pts
8	Northern Pride	6	3	0	3	121	126	5	6

ROUND 7: Wizard Queensland Cup 2009

ANZAC DAY,
Saturday
25 April 2009
19:00 AEST (UTC+10)

Northern Pride	32 – 6	Redcliffe Dolphins
Tries: Ty Williams* 2 Rod Jensen 1 Joel Riethmuller 1 Mark Cantoni 1 Jason Roos 1 Goals: Chey Bird 3 Luke Millwood 1	Match Report; Video Highlights	Tries: 1 Allen Heldsinger Goals: 1 Liam Georgetown

Barlow Park
(Severin Street, Parramatta Park, QLD)
Referee: Shane Spicer
Touch Judges: Michael Inman and Adam Puet
Interchange Official: Rob Dalziel

Skill360Northern Pride: 1. Chey Bird – FB 2. Brandon Boor* – WG 3. Ty Williams* – CE 4. Hezron Murgha – CE 5. John Williams* – WG 6. Tom Humble – FE 19. Chris Sheppard (c) – HB 8. Ben Laity – PR 9. Jason Roos – HK 10. Carl Webb* – PR 11. James Tamou* – SR 12. Mark Cantoni – SR 13. Joel Riethmuller – LK
Interchange: 14. Rod Jensen, 15. Nick Slyney*, 16. Alex Starmer, 17. Noel Underwood.
* = Cowboys allocation.
Unavailable: Tom Humble (shoulder).
Redcliffe Dolphins: 1. Liam Georgetown, 2. Allan Heldsinger, 3. Chris Fox, 4. Alwyn Simpson, 5. Andrew Rickertt, 6. Palmer Wapau, 7. Dane Campbell, 13. Derrick Watkins, 12. Danny Burke, 11. Brian West, 10. James Crombie, 9. Tommy Butterfield, 8. Matt Handcock.
Interchange: 14. Craig Priestly, 15. Troy Giess, 16. Pat Mcpherson, 17. Chris Farrell.
Coach: Gary O'Brien.

Position	Round 7 – 2009	P	W	D	L	For	Against	Diff	Pts
6	Northern Pride	7	4	0	3	153	132	+21	8

ROUND 8: Wizard Queensland Cup 2009

Sunday
3 May 2009
14:00 AEST (UTC+10)

Norths Devils	18 – 34	Northern Pride
Tries: Kieran Turner 1 Jay Aston 1 James Api-Ulugia 1 Goals: Ryan Hansen 3	Match Report; Video Highlights	Tries: 2 Jason Roos; 1 Brandon Boor*; 1 Rod Jensen; 1 Nick Slyney*; 1 Ben Laity; Goals: 5 Chey Bird

Albert Bishop Park
(Hedley Avenue, Nundah QLD)
Referee: Adam Neale.
Touch Judges: Brendon Rose and Ron Greentree.

Skill360 Northern Pride: 1. Chey Bird – FB 2. Brandon Boor* – WG 3. Ty Williams* – CE 4. Hezron Murgha – CE 5. Rod Jensen – WG 6. Luke Millwood – FE 7. Chris Sheppard (c) – HB 8. Alex Starmer – PR 9. Jason Roos – HK 10. Manase Manuokafoa* – PR 11. Nick Slyney* – SR 12. Mark Cantoni – SR 13. Joel Riethmuller – LK
Interchange: 14. Tom Humble, 15. Josh Vaughan, 16. Matthew Bartlett*, 17. Ben Laity.
* = Cowboys allocation.
Unavailable: Luke Harlen (knee).
Northern Suburbs Devils: 1. Kieran Turner, 2. Georg Kepa, 3. Jace Brown, 4. Ben Hurrell, 5. Gideon Mzembe, 6. Asher Elemani, 7. Jason Connors, 13. Matt Gillett, 12. Ryan Hansen, 11. Eddy Purcell, 10. Troy Hansen, 9. Jay Aston, 8. Mark Leafa.
Interchange: 14. Aaron Trinder, 15. Nathan Cleaver, 16. James Api Ulugia, 17. Josefa Davui.
Coach: Kevin Carmichael.
- Note:
  This was Jason Roos and Chey Birds's 25th game for the Pride.

Position	Round 8 – 2009	P	W	D	L	For	Against	Diff	Pts
3	Northern Pride	8	5	0	3	187	150	+37	10

ROUND 9: Wizard Queensland Cup 2009

Saturday
9 May 2009
19:00 AEST (UTC+10)

Northern Pride	34 – 16	Mackay Cutters
Tries: Tom Humble 2 Ty Williams* 1 Rod Jensen 1 Manase Manuokafoa* 1 Alex Starmer 1 Goals: Chey Bird 5	Match Report; Video Highlights	Tries: 1 Daniel Abraham; 1 Jardine Bobongie; 1 Anthony Watts Goals: 2 Daniel Abraham

Barlow Park
(Severin Street, Parramatta Park, QLD)
Referee: Brendon Rose
Touch Judges: Michael Inman and Rob Dalziel
Interchange Official: Adam Puet

Skill360 Northern Pride: 1. Chey Bird – FB 2. Brandon Boor* – WG 3. Ty Williams* – CE 4. Hezron Murgha – CE 5. Rod Jensen – WG 6. Luke Millwood – FE 7. Chris Sheppard (c) – HB 8. Ben Laity – PR 9. Jason Roos – HK 10. Manase Manuokafoa* – PR 11. Nick Slyney* – SR 12. Mark Cantoni – SR 22. Joel Riethmuller – LK
Interchange: 14. Tom Humble, 16. Matthew Bartlett*, 17. Alex Starmer, 19. Jamie Frizzo.
* = Cowboys allocation.
Unavailable: Luke Harlen (knee).
Mackay Cutters: 1. Donald Malone, 2. Anthony Perkins, 3. Royston Lightning, 4. Sam Granville, 5. Chris Giumelli, 6. Daniel Abraham, 7. Todd Seymour, 13. Grant Moore, 12. Darren Griffiths, 11. Jardine Bobongie, 10. Joshua Rovelli, 9. Anthony Watts, 8. Dayne Weston.
Interchange: 14. Roy Baira, 15. Michael Comerford, 16. Regan Hyde, 17. Jerome Iakimo.
Coach: Shane Muspratt.
- Note: Cutter Roy Baira received a four-week ban from the Queensland Rugby League judiciary tribunal after being found guilty of a grade three reckless high tackle on Pride's Luke Millwood which broke his jaw. The Northern Pride were fined $3,000 after coach Dunemann questioned the leniency of the penalty.
  This was Mark Cantoni, Hezron Murgha and Chris Sheppard's 25th game for the Pride.

Position	Round 9 – 2009	P	W	D	L	For	Against	Diff	Pts
3	Northern Pride	9	6	0	3	221	166	+55	12

ROUND 10: Wizard Queensland Cup 2009

Saturday
16 May 2009
19:00 AEST (UTC+10)

Central Comets	28 – 26	Northern Pride
Tries: Tyron Haynes 2 Dallas Williams 2 Karl Johnson 1 Ian Webster1; Goals: Nat Bowman 2	Match Report; Video Highlights	Tries: 2 Tom Humble; 1 Hezron Murgha; 1 Mark Cantoni; 1 Jamie Frizzo; Goals: 2 Chey Bird; 1 Tom Humble

Browne Park
(Wandal, Rockhampton, QLD)
Referee: Shane Spicer
Touch Judges: Steve Kanowski and Jason McManus
Interchange Official: Housh Fallah

Skill360 Northern Pride: 1. Chey Bird – FB 2. Brandon Boor* – WG 3. Ty Williams* – CE 4. Hezron Murgha – CE 5. Rod Jensen – WG 6. Tom Humble – FE 7. Chris Sheppard (c) – HB 8. Ben Laity – PR 9. Jason Roos – HK 10. Manase Manuokafoa* – PR 11. Jamie Frizzo – SR 12. Mark Cantoni – SR 13. Joel Riethmuller – LK
Interchange: 14. Gordon Rattler, 16. Matthew Bartlett*, 17. Alex Starmer, 20. Rod Griffin.
* = Cowboys allocation.
Unavailable: Luke Harlen (knee), Luke Millwood (broken jaw).
Central Comets: 1. Junior Auru, 2. Casey Lillyman, 3. Karl Johnson, 4. Tyron Haynes, 5. Dallas Williams, 6. Jade Williams, 7. Nat Bowman (c), 13. Mick Esdale, 12. Guy Williams, 11. Alan Rothery, 10. Aaron Summers, 9. Ian Webster, 8. Gerard Parle.
Interchange: 14. Marc Fickling, 15. Damien Major, 16. Liam Anlezark, 17. George Tuakura.
Coach: Wayne Barnett.

Position	Round 10 – 2009	P	W	D	L	For	Against	Diff	Pts
3	Northern Pride	10	6	0	4	247	194	+53	12

ROUND 11: Wizard Queensland Cup 2009

Sunday
24 May 2009
14:00 AEST (UTC+10)

Souths Logan Magpies	16 – 30	Northern Pride
Tries: Shea Moylan 2 Sam Huihahau 1 Goals: Josh McCrone 2	Match Report; Video Highlights	Tries: 2 Germaine Paulson; 1 Chey Bird; 1 Rod Jensen; 1 Mark Cantoni; Goals: 5 Chey Bird

Davies Park
(West End, Brisbane, QLD)
Referee: Clayton Sharpe
Touch Judges: Michael Wise and Jon Kennedy
Interchange Official: Gavin Adams

Skill360 Northern Pride: 1. Chey Bird – FB 2. Brandon Boor* – WG 4. Rod Jensen – CE 5. Germaine Paulson – CE 14. Josh Vaughan – WG 6. Tom Humble – FE 7. Chris Sheppard (c) – HB 8. Ben Laity – PR 9. Jason Roos – HK 10. Manase Manuokafoa* – PR 11. Jamie Frizzo – SR 12. Mark Cantoni – SR 13. Joel Riethmuller – LK .
Interchange: 15. Nick Slyney*, 16. Greg Byrnes, 17. Chris Riesen, 18. Quincy To'oto'o-ulugia.
* = Cowboys allocation.
Unavailable: Luke Harlen (knee), Ty Williams* (last minute call up for North Queensland Cowboys), Luke Millwood (broken jaw), Luke Harlen (knee).
Souths Logan Magpies: 1. Shea Moylan, 2. Sam Huihahau, 3. James Stuart, 4. Brad Cross, 5. Michael Brophy, 6. Phil Dennis (c), 7. Matt Smith, 13. Lewis Balcomb, 12. Andrew Edwards, 11. Josh White, 10. Liam Mcdonald, 9. Paul Stanley, 8. Nick Skinner.
Interchange: 14. Chad Grintell, 15. Matt King, 16. ? 17. ?
Coach: Paul Bramley.

Position	Round 11 – 2009	P	W	D	L	For	Against	Diff	Pts
3	Northern Pride	11	7	0	4	277	210	+67	14

ROUND 12: Wizard Queensland Cup 2009

Saturday
30 May 2009
19:00 AEST (UTC+10)

Northern Pride	26 – 14	Tweed Heads Seagulls
Tries: Tom Humble 2 Hezron Murgha 1 Germaine Paulson 1 Adam Mills 1 Goals: Chey Bird 3	Match Report; Video Highlights	Tries: 1 David Mead; 1 Brad Davis; 1 Kingi Akauola Goals: 1 Brad Davis

Barlow Park
(Severin Street, Parramatta Park, QLD)
Referee: Nick Kalpakidis
Touch Judges: Michael Inman and Adam Puet
Interchange Official: Rob Dalziel

Skill360 Northern Pride: 1. Chey Bird – FB 2. Hezron Murgha – WG 3. Jamie Frizzo – CE 4. Rod Jensen – CE 5. Germaine Paulson – WG 6. Tom Humble – FE 7. Chris Sheppard (c) – HB 8. Ben Laity – PR 9. Jason Roos – HK 10. Alex Starmer – PR 11. Nick Slyney* – SR 12. Mark Cantoni – SR 13. Joel Riethmuller – LK
Interchange: 15. Josh Vaughan, 16. Greg Byrnes, 17. Rodney Griffin, 18. Adam Mills.
* = Cowboys allocation.
Unavailable: Luke Millwood (broken jaw), Luke Harlen (knee).
Tweed Heads Seagulls: 1. Ben Jeffery, 2. David Mead, 3. Jordan Atkins, 4. James Wood, 5. Cameron White, 6. Brad Davis, 7. Tim Maccan, 13. Ryan Simpkins, 12. Josh Graham, 11. Daniel Conn, 10. Brock Hunter, 9. Geoff Holcombe, 8. Will Matthews.
Interchange: 14. Kingi Akauola, 15. Jake Leary, 16. Bodene Thompson, 17. Cody Nelson.
Coach: Steve Lacey.
- Note: Only one North Queensland Cowboys player, (Nick Slyney*), was available for the Pride this week, due to State of Origin commitments, and the Pride team consisted of 16 local players.

Position	Round 12 – 2009	P	W	D	L	For	Against	Diff	Pts
3	Northern Pride	12	8	0	4	303	224	+79	16

ROUND 13: Wizard Queensland Cup 2009

Friday
5 June 2009
19:00 AEST (UTC+10)

Northern Pride	22 – 8	Ipswich Jets
Tries: Germaine Paulson 1 Rod Jensen 1 Tom Humble 1 Adam Mills 1 Goals: Chey Bird 3	Match Report; Video Highlights	Tries: 1 Lorenzo Maafu; 1 Adam Boettcher Goals: 0

Barlow Park
(Severin Street, Parramatta Park, QLD)
Referee: Justin Davis
Touch Judges: Michael Inman and Rob Dalziel
Interchange Official: Mark Leigh

Skill360 Northern Pride: 1. Chey Bird – FB 2. Brandon Boor* – WG 3. Germaine Paulson – CE 4. Rod Jensen – CE 5. Hezron Murgha – WG 6. Tom Humble – FE 7. Chris Sheppard (c) – HB 8. Ben Laity – PR 9. Jason Roos – HK 10. Manase Manuokafoa* – PR 16. Nick Slyney* – SR 12. Mark Cantoni – SR 13. Joel Riethmuller – LK
Interchange: 14. Richie Marsters, 15. Josh Vaughan, 18. Adam Mills, 22. Greg Byrnes.
* = Cowboys allocation.
Unavailable: Jamie Frizzo (broken cheekbone), Luke Millwood (broken jaw), Luke Harlen (knee).
Ipswich Jets: 1. Troy Osullivan, 2. Ramon Filipine, 3. Jackson Nicolau, 4. Brendan Marshall, 5. Luke Walker, 6. Jeremy Golf, 7. Ian Lacey, 13. Dan Coburn, 12. Matt Mcphee, 11. Dan Fullarton, 10. Matthew White, 9. Michael Ryan, 8. Paul Stephenson.
Interchange: 14. Adam Boettcher, 15. Tamati Talanoa, 16. Dale Robertson, 17. Tyson Lofipo.
Coach: Glenn Lazarus.
- Note: This was a long weekend and all QCup games were played on Friday night. A first for the QRL.

Position	Round 13 – 2009	P	W	D	L	For	Against	Diff	Pts
3	Northern Pride	13	9	0	4	325	232	+93	18

ROUND 14: Wizard Queensland Cup 2009

Saturday
20 June 2009
14:00 AEST (UTC+10)

Easts Tigers	42 – 12	Northern Pride
Tries: Liam Campbell 2 Wade Liddell 2 Ryan Cullen 1 Isaac Kaufmann 1 Marcus Jensen 1 Goals: Nathan Pill 7	Match Report; Video Highlights	Tries: 1 Hezron Murgha; 1 Rod Jensen Goals: 2 Chey Bird

Langlands Park
(Stones Corner, Brisbane, QLD)
Referee: Chris Butler.
Touch Judges: Steve Kanowski and Peter Anderson.
Interchange Official: Jason King.

Skill360 Northern Pride: 1. Chey Bird – FB 2. Hezron Murgha – WG 3. Germaine Paulson – CE 4. Rod Jensen – CE 5. Gordon Rattler – WG 6. Tom Humble – FE 7. Chris Sheppard (c) – HB 8. Ben Laity – PR 9. Jason Roos – HK 10. Alex Starmer – PR 11. Nick Slyney* – SR 12. Mark Cantoni – SR 13. Joel Riethmuller – LK
Interchange: 14. Brandon Boor*, 15. Josh Vaughan, 16. Greg Byrnes, 17. Rod Griffin.
* = Cowboys allocation.
Unavailable: Luke Millwood (broken jaw), Luke Harlen (knee).
Easts Tigers: 1. Ryan Cullen, 2. Joe Richards, 3. Liam Campbell, 4. Tom Macgougan, 5. Wade Liddell, 6. Isaac Kaufmann, 7. Nathan Pill, 13. Anthony Boyd, 12. Marcus Jensen, 11. Mark Offerdahl, 10. Isaak Ah Mau, 9. Trent Young, 8. Ben Vaeau.
Interchange: 14. Matt Cameron, 15. Fabian Soutar, 16. Wallace Solomona, 17. Arana Taumata.
Coach: Jason Gainey.
- Note: This was Alex Starmer's 25th game for the Pride.

Position	Round 14 – 2009	P	W	D	L	For	Against	Diff	Pts
3	Northern Pride	14	9	0	5	337	274	+63	18

ROUND 15: Wizard Queensland Cup 2009

Saturday
27 June 2009
14:00 AEST (UTC+10)

Sunshine Coast Sea Eagles	30 – 18	Northern Pride
Tries: Dennis Sandow 1 Shane Neumann 1 Mark Page 1 Jack Pearson 1 Trent Hodkinson 1 Goals: Trent Hodkinson 5	Match Report; Video Highlights	Tries: 1 Rod Jensen; 1 Greg Byrnes; 1 Hezron Murgha Goals: 3 Chey Bird

Stockland Park
(Sportsmans Parade, Bokarina, Kawana Waters, QLD)
Broadcast live on ABC 1 TV
Referee: Clayton Sharpe
Touch Judges: Rod Spain and Andrew Wareham
Interchange Official:Terry Pascoe
Video Referee: Tony Maksoud

Skill360 Northern Pride: 1. Chey Bird – FB 2. Drew Campbell – WG 3. Germaine Paulson – CE 4. Rod Jensen – CE 5. Josh Vaughan – WG 6. Tom Humble – FE 18. Quincy To'oto'o-ulugia – HB 8. Ben Laity – PR 9. Callan Myles – HK 10. Greg Byrnes – PR 17. Chris Riesen – SR 12. Mark Cantoni – SR 13. Joel Riethmuller – LK
Interchange: 14. Brandon Boor*, 15. Noel Underwood, 16. Rod Griffin, 18. Hezron Murgha.
* = Cowboys allocation.
Unavailable: Chris Sheppard (hamstring), Luke Millwood (broken jaw), Luke Harlen (knee).
Sunshine Coast Sea Eagles: 1. Dennis Sandow, 2. Michael Chapman, 3. Shane Neumann, 4. Ryan Walker, 5. Mark Page, 6. Jack Pearson, 7. Trent Hodkinson, 13. Jon Muir, 12. Andrew Gray, 11. Jon Grieve, 10. Vic Mauro, 9. Cameron Joyce, 8. Phil Morwood.
Interchange: 14. Simon Allen, 15. Rob Godfrey, 16. Steven Mcphee, 17. Junior Palau.
Coach: Brandon Costin.
- Note: Broadcast live on ABC 1 TV with ABC Sport's Gerry Collins, Warren Boland and David Wright.

Position	Round 15 – 2009	P	W	D	L	For	Against	Diff	Pts
3	Northern Pride	15	9	0	6	355	304	+51	18

ROUND 16: Wizard Queensland Cup 2009

Saturday
11 July 2009
19:00 AEST (UTC+10)

Northern Pride	18 – 30	Burleigh Bears
Tries: Jamie Frizzo 2 Jason Roos 1 Chris Riesen 1 Goals: Chris Riesen 1	Match Report; Video Highlights	Tries: 3 Joel Rapana; 2 Nick Parfitt Goals: 5 Nick Parfitt

Barlow Park
(Severin Street, Parramatta Park, QLD)
Referee: Michael Inman
Touch Judges: Adam Puet and Rob Dalziel
Interchange Official: Daniel Caamano

Skill360 Northern Pride: 1. Josh Vaughan – FB 2. Drew Campbell – WG 3. Germaine Paulson – CE 4. Jamie Frizzo – CE 5. Brandon Boor* – WG 6. Richie Marsters – FE 7. Chris Sheppard (c) – HB 8. Ben Laity – PR 9. Jason Roos – HK 10. Manase Manuokafoa* – PR 11. Nick Slyney* – SR 12. James Tamou* – SR 13. Joel Riethmuller – LK
Interchange: 14. Matthew Bartlett*, 15. Chris Riesen, 16. Luke Harlen, 17. Noel Underwood.
* = Cowboys allocation.
Unavailable: Rod Jensen, Mark Cantoni and Tom Humble (representative duties), Chey Bird (ribs).
Burleigh Bears: 1. Marty Paulson, 2. Joel Rapana, 3. Adam Fielder, 4. Daniel Isaac, 5. Nick Parfitt, 6. Jacob Fauid, 7. Brent Mcconnell, 13. Matt Pow, 12. Robert Apanui, 11. Martin Griese, 10. Aaron Sweeney, 9. Kurt Sorensen, 8. Kale Burton.
Interchange: 14. Ryan Wilson, 15. Tanu Wulf, 16. Brett O Farrell, 17. Jamie Judge.
Coach: Jimmy Lenihan.
- Note: Rod Jensen, Mark Cantoni, Joel Riethmuller and Tom Humble were selected for the QRL XXXX Country Team on 4 July 2009, with Andrew Dunemann as coach.
  The XXX Country team won 32–28 and Mark Cantoni was Man of the Match.
  Jensen, Cantoni and Humble were then selected for the QRL Queensland Residents Team

Position	Round 16 – 2009	P	W	D	L	For	Against	Diff	Pts
3	Northern Pride	16	9	0	7	373	334	+39	18

ROUND 17: Wizard Queensland Cup 2009

Sunday
18 July 2009
14:00 AEST (UTC+10)

Wynnum Manly Seagulls	24 – 38	Northern Pride
Tries: John Peterson 2 Shaun Cotter 1 David Georgiou 1 Goals: Matt Seamark 4	Match Report	Tries: 2 Tom Humble; 2 Jamie Frizzo; 1 Mark Cantoni; 1 Nick Slyney*; 1 Chris Riesen; Goals: 5 Tom Humble

BMD Kougari Oval
(Manly West, Brisbane, QLD)
Referee: Clayton Sharpe.
Touch Judges: Ron Greentree and Peter Anderson.
Interchange Official: Tony Graham.

Skill360 Northern Pride: 1. Germaine Paulson – FB 2. Josh Vaughan – WG 3. Rod Jensen – CE 4. Jamie Frizzo – CE 5. Hezron Murgha – WG 6. Tom Humble – FE 7. Chris Sheppard (c) – HB 8. Ben Laity – PR 9. Jason Roos – HK 10. Luke Harlen – PR 11. Nick Slyney* – SR 12. Mark Cantoni – SR 13. Joel Riethmuller – LK
Interchange: 14. Matthew Bartlett*, 15. Chris Riesen, 16. Greg Byrnes, 17. Brandon Boor*.
Reserve: 18. Rod Griffin.
* = Cowboys allocation.
Unavailable: Chey Bird (ribs).
Wynnum Manly Seagulls: 1. Simon Phillips, 2. Shaun Cotter, 3. Jason Moon, 4. David Georgiou, 5. David Seage, 6. Chris Birch, 7. Matt Seamark, 13. Adam Brideson, 12. Lachlan Morgan, 11. Luke Dalziel Don, 10. Will Scanlan, 9. Aoterangi Herangi, 8. Jason Williams.
Interchange: 14. Chris Muckert, 15. Fili Sofa, 16. Jake Granville, 17. Brett Thomas.
Coach: Shane Mcnally.
- Note: Jensen, Cantoni and Humble were selected for the QRL Queensland Residents Team

Position	Round 17 – 2009	P	W	D	L	For	Against	Diff	Pts
3	Northern Pride	17	10	0	7	411	358	+53	20

ROUND 18: Wizard Queensland Cup 2009

Saturday
25 July 2009
14:00 AEST (UTC+10)

Redcliffe Dolphins	24 – 54	Northern Pride
Tries: Liam Georgetown 3 Palmer Wapau 1 Goals: Liam Georgetown 4	Match Report; Video Highlights	Tries: 4 Tom Humble; 1 Germaine Paulson; 1 Mark Cantoni; 1 Luke Harlen; 1 Matthew Bartlett*; 1 Chris Riesen; Goals: 9 Tom Humble

Dolphin Oval
(Klingner Road, Redcliffe, QLD)
Broadcast live on ABC 1 TV
Attendance: Match Report
Referee: Justin Davis
Touch Judges: Steve Kanowski and Andrew Wareham
Interchange Official: Jason King
Video Referee: Tony Maksoud

Skill360 Northern Pride: 1. Germaine Paulson – FB 2. Josh Vaughan – WG 3. Rod Jensen – CE 4. Jamie Frizzo – CE 5. Hezron Murgha – WG 6. Tom Humble – FE 7. Chris Sheppard (c) – HB 8. Ben Laity – PR 9. Jason Roos – HK 10. Luke Harlen – PR 11. Nick Slyney* – SR 12. Mark Cantoni – SR 13. Joel Riethmuller – LK
Interchange: 14. Matthew Bartlett*, 15. Chris Riesen, 16. Greg Byrnes, 17. Brandon Boor*.
* = Cowboys allocation.
Unavailable: Chey Bird (ribs).
Redcliffe Dolphins: 1. Liam Georgetown, 2. Alwyn Simpson, 3. Mitch Rivett, 4. Andrew Rickertt, 5. Piripi Neho Popata, 6. Ryan Ghetti, 7. Craig Priestly, 13. Matt Handcock, 12. Danny Burke, 11. Palmer Wapau, 10. James Crombie, 9. Tom Butterfield, 8. Chris Farrell.
Interchange: 14. Allan Heldsinger, 15. Troy Lindsay, 16. Adam Marr, 17. Gene Vaafusuaga.
Coach: Gary O'Brien.
- Note: Broadcast live on ABC 1 TV with ABC Sport's Gerry Collins, Warren Boland and David Wright.
  Tom Humble scored 34 points in this game, which was a Pride record for most points in a single game. Humble also scored 4 tries, which equalled the Pride's record held by Brett Anderson of 4 tries against the Mackay Cutters in the Pride's first ever game, Round 1 on 15 March 2008.
  This was Jamie Frizzo's 25th game for the Pride.

Position	Round 18 – 2009	P	W	D	L	For	Against	Diff	Pts
3	Northern Pride	18	11	0	7	465	382	+83	22

ROUND 19: Wizard Queensland Cup 2009

Saturday
1 August 2009
19:00 AEST (UTC+10)

Northern Pride	22 – 18	Norths Devils
Tries: Hezron Murgha 2 Rod Jensen 1 Tom Humble 1 Goals: Tom Humble 3	Match Report; Video Highlights	Tries: 1 Joe Bond; 1 Daniel Ogden; 1 Brendon Gibb; 1 Gideon Mzembe; Goals: 1 Asher Elemani

Barlow Park
(Severin Street, Parramatta Park, QLD)
Referee: Michael Inman
Touch Judges: Adam Puet and Rob Dalziel
Interchange Official: Daniel Caamano

Skill360 Northern Pride: 1. Chey Bird – FB 2. Germaine Paulson – WG 3. Rod Jensen – CE 4. Jamie Frizzo – CE 5. Hezron Murgha – WG 6. Tom Humble – FE 7. Chris Sheppard (c) – HB 8. Ben Laity – PR 9. Jason Roos – HK 10. Luke Harlen – PR 11. Nick Slyney* – SR 12. Mark Cantoni – SR 13. Joel Riethmuller – LK
Interchange: 14. Matthew Bartlett*, 15. Chris Riesen, 16. Noel Underwood, 17. Brandon Boor*.
* = Cowboys allocation.
Norths Devils: 1. Joe Bond, 2. Daniel Ogden, 3. Josefa Davui, 4. Brendon Gibb, 5. Gideon Mzembe, 6. Scott Hurrell, 7. Matt Geyer, 13. Matt Gillett, 12. Aaron Trinder, 11. Fletcher Holmes, 10. Nathan Cleaver, 9. Jay Aston, 8. Mark Leafa.
Interchange: 14. Asher Elemani, 15. James Sharkie, 16. Troy Hansen, 17. Eddy Purcell.
Coach: Kevin Carmichael.

Position	Round 19 – 2009	P	W	D	L	For	Against	Diff	Pts
3	Northern Pride	19	12	0	7	487	400	+87	24

ROUND 20: Wizard Queensland Cup 2009

Sunday
9 August 2009
15:00 AEST (UTC+10)

Mackay Cutters	17 – 16	Northern Pride
Tries: Daniel Flynn 1 Luke Srama 1 Anthony Perkins 1 Goals: Craig Chapman 2 Field goals: Craig hapman 1	Sin bin: Travis Burns*; Sent off: Travis Burns* ----- Match Report	Tries: 2 Tom Humble; 1 Jamie Frizzo Goals: 2 Tom Humble; Field goals:

Mackay Junior Fields
(Bridge Road, South Mackay, QLD)
Referee: Justin Davis
Touch Judges: Clinton Begg and Chris Anderson
Interchange Official: Zane Wright

Skill360 Northern Pride: 1. Chey Bird – FB 2. Germaine Paulson – WG 3. Rod Jensen – CE 4. Jamie Frizzo – CE 5. Hezron Murgha – WG 6. Tom Humble – FE 7. Chris Sheppard (c) – HB 8. Ben Laity – PR 9. Jason Roos – HK 10. Luke Harlen – PR 11. Nick Slyney* – SR 12. Mark Cantoni – SR 13. Joel Riethmuller – LK
Interchange: 14. Matthew Bartlett*, 16. Greg Byrnes, 17. Brandon Boor*, 19. Travis Burns*.
* = Cowboys allocation.
Mackay Cutters: 1. Daniel Flynn, 2. Michael Comerford, 3. Donald Malone, 4. Dean Tass, 5. Chris Giumelli, 6. Todd Seymour, 7. Craig Chapman, 13. Jardine Bobongie, 12. Jerome Iakimo, 11. Dayne Weston, 10. Joshua Rovelli, 9. Luke Srama, 8. Adam Walker.
Interchange: 14. Roy Baira, 15. Bennett Smith, 16. Grant Moore, 17. Quinton Fielder.
Coach: Shane Muspratt.
- Note: North Queensland Cowboys Travis Burns* was a late addition to the team. He was sin-binned in the second half and then sent off.
  This was the Pride debut for Travis Burns* (Player 047).
  This was Joel Riethmuller's 25th game for the Pride.

Position	Round 20 – 2009	P	W	D	L	For	Against	Diff	Pts
3	Northern Pride	20	12	0	8	503	417	+86	24

ROUND 21: Wizard Queensland Cup 2009

Saturday
15 August 2009
19:00 AEST (UTC+10)

Northern Pride	32 – 10	Central Comets
Tries: Chey Bird 1 Rod Jensen 1 Jamie Frizzo 1 Tom Humble 1 Travis Burns* 1 Josh Vaughan 1 Goals: Tom Humble 4	Match Report; Video Highlights	Tries: 1 Ian Webster; 1 Mick Esdale Goals: 1 Gerard Parle

Barlow Park
(Severin Street, Parramatta Park, QLD)
Referee: Michael Inman
Touch Judges: Adam Puet and Rob Dalziel
Interchange Official: Mark Leigh

Skill360 Northern Pride: 1. Chey Bird – FB 2. Brandon Boor* – WG 3. Rod Jensen – CE 4. Jamie Frizzo – CE 5. Germaine Paulson – WG 6. Tom Humble – FE 7. Chris Sheppard (c) – HB 8. Ben Laity – PR 9. Travis Burns* – HK 10. Luke Harlen – PR 11. Nick Slyney* – SR 12. Mark Cantoni – SR 13. Joel Riethmuller – LK
Interchange: 14. Josh Vaughan, 15. Alex Starmer, 16. Chris Riesen, 19. Luke Millwood.
* = Cowboys allocation.
Unavailable: Jason Roos (ribs).
Central Comets: 1. Tom Hewitt, 2. Matt Sing, 3. Karl Johnson, 4. Jade Williams, 5. Dallas Williams, 6. Ian Webster, 7. Nat Bowman (c), 13. Guy Williams, 12. Tyron Haynes, 11. Alan Rothery, 10. Aaron Summers, 9. Marc Fickling, 8. Gerard Parle.
Interchange: 14. Mick Esdale, 15. Todd Titmus, 16. Liam Anlezark, 17. George Tuakura.
Coach: Wayne Barnett.
- Note: Joel Riethmuller was placed on report for a dangerous tackle, but was found not guilty by the judiciary.

Position	Round 21 – 2009	P	W	D	L	For	Against	Diff	Pts
2	Northern Pride	21	13	0	8	535	427	+108	26

ROUND 22: Wizard Queensland Cup 2009

Friday
21 August 2009
20:00 AEST (UTC+10)

Northern Pride	29 – 18	Souths Logan Magpies
Tries: Brandon Boor* 1 Rod Jensen 1 Germaine Paulson 1 Josh Vaughan 1 Alex Starmer 1 Goals: Tom Humble 4 Field goals: Chris Sheppard 1	Match Report	Tries: 2 Andrew Edwards; 1 Jack Reed Goals: 3 Brett Kelly; Field goals:

Barlow Park
(Severin Street, Parramatta Park, QLD)
Referee: Clayton Sharpe
Touch Judges: Michael Inman and Adam Puet
Interchange Official: Rob Dalziel

Skill360 Northern Pride: 1. Chey Bird – FB 2. Brandon Boor* – WG 3. Rod Jensen – CE 4. Jamie Frizzo – CE 5. Germaine Paulson – WG 6. Tom Humble – FE 7. Chris Sheppard (c) – HB 8. Ben Laity – PR 9. Joel Riethmuller – HK 10. James Tamou* – PR 11. Nick Slyney* – SR 12. Mark Cantoni – SR 13. Chris Riesen – LK
Interchange: 14. Josh Vaughan, 15. Alex Starmer, 17. Rod Griffin, 19. Luke Millwood.
* = Cowboys allocation.
Unavailable: Luke Harlen (hand), Jason Roos (ribs).
Souths Logan Magpies: 1. Shea Moylan, 2. Jack Reed, 3. Bradley Cross, 4. Adrian Purtell, 5. Brett Kelly, 6. Phil Dennis, 7. Matt Smith, 13. Glen Buttriss, 12. Joshua White, 11. Glen Turner, 10. Lewis Balcomb, 9. Matt King (c), 8. Daniel Joyce.
Interchange: 14. Stewart Flanagan, 15. Kieran Whalley, 16. Sean Mcbride, 17. Andrew Edwards.
Coach: Paul Bramley.
- Note: Barlow Park had been booked for the CDRU Grand Final, and so the CDRU game was played at 3.00pm and the Pride game was played at 8.00pm.

Position	Round 22 – 2009	P	W	D	L	For	Against	Diff	Pts
2	Northern Pride	22	14	0	8	564	445	+119	28

=== 2009 Ladder ===
	Team	Pld	W	D	L	PF	PA	PD	Pts
1	Souths Logan Magpies	22	16	0	6	711	434	+277	32
2	Northern Pride	22	14	0	8	564	445	+119	28
3	Central Comets	22	13	0	9	508	499	+9	26
4	Sunshine Coast Sea Eagles	22	12	1	9	562	508	+54	25
5	Norths Devils	22	11	0	11	559	524	+35	22
6	Tweed Heads Seagulls	22	11	0	11	525	515	+10	22
7	Burleigh Bears	22	11	0	11	445	517	−72	22
8	Ipswich Jets	22	9	1	12	455	454	+1	19
9	Easts Tigers	22	9	1	12	451	548	−97	19
10	Wynnum Manly Seagulls	22	9	0	13	484	548	−64	18
11	Redcliffe Dolphins	22	7	2	13	472	518	−46	16
12	Mackay Cutters	22	7	1	14	315	541	−226	15

==== Northern Pride (regular season 2009) ====
- Win = 14 (9 of 11 home games, 5 of 11 away games)
- Loss = 8 (2 of 11 home games, 6 of 11 away games)

Round	1	2	3	4	5	6	7	8	9	10	11	12	13	14	15	16	17	18	19	20	21	22
Result	L	W	W	L	L	W	W	W	W	L	W	W	W	L	L	L	W	W	W	L	W	W
Ground	A	A	H	H	A	H	H	A	H	A	A	H	H	A	A	H	A	A	H	A	H	H

Source: https://web.archive.org/web/20091025182708/http://www.qrl.com.au/queensland_cup/q_cup_results.php
A = Away; H = Home; B = Bye; W = Win; D = Draw; L = Loss

== Finals Series ==
In 2009, after using a five-team finals series for 10 years, the Queensland Cup used a six-team system.

Semifinals
1	Souths Logan Magpies	16
6	Tweed Heads Seagulls	8
2	Central Comets	21
5	Sunshine Coast Sea Eagles	14
3	Northern Pride	44
4	Norths Devils	16

Preliminary Finals
W1	Northern Pride	22
L1	Central Comets	10
W2	Souths Logan Magpies	26
W3	Sunshine Coast Sea Eagles	30

Grand Final
Northern Pride	18
Sunshine Coast Sea Eagles	32

Finals Week 1 - Elimination Final

Saturday
29 August 2009
20:00 AEST (UTC+10)

Northern Pride	44 – 16	Norths Devils
Tries: Rod Jensen 3 Germaine Paulson 1 Nick Slyney* 1 Luke Millwood 1 Chris Riesen 1 Rod Griffin 1 Goals: Tom Humble 6	Match report	Tries: 2 Josefa Davui; 1 M Gillett Goals: 2 Asher Elemani

Barlow Park
(Severin Street, Parramatta Park, QLD)
Referee: Justin Davis
Touch judges: Michael Inman, Adam Puet
Interchange Official: Rob Dalziel

Skill360 Northern Pride: 1. Chey Bird – FB 2. Josh Vaughan – WG 3. Rod Jensen – CE 4. Jamie Frizzo – CE 5. Germaine Paulson – WG 6. Tom Humble – FE 7. Chris Sheppard (c) – HB 8. Ben Laity – PR 9. Luke Millwood 10. Alex Starmer – PR 11. Nick Slyney* 12. Mark Cantoni 13. Joel Riethmuller
Interchange: 15. Greg Byrnes, 16. Chris Riesen, 17. Rod Griffin, 19. Jason Roos.
* = Cowboys allocation.
Unavailable: Luke Harlen (hand).
Norths Devils: 1. Joe Bond, 2. Daniel Ogden, 3. Josefa Davui, 4. Adam Fletcher, 5. Gideon Mzembe, 6. Matt Geyer, 7. Asher Elemani, 13. Matt Gillett, 12. Aaron Trinder, 11. Eddy Purcell, 10. Troy Hansen, 9. Jay Aston, 8. Mark Leafa.
Interchange: 14. Brendan Gibb, 15. James Api Ulugia, 16. James Sharkie, 17. Ryan Hansen.
Coach: Kevin Carmichael.

Finals Week 2 - Semi-Final

Saturday
5 September 2009
14:00 AEST (UTC+10)

Northern Pride	22 – 10	Central Comets
Tries: Chey Bird 1 Tom Humble 1 Nick Slyney* 1 Rod Griffin 1 Goals: Tom Humble 3	Match Report 1 Match Report 2	Tries: 1 Tom Hewitt; 1 Guy Williams Goals: 1 Nat Bowman

BMD Kougari Oval
(Manly West, Brisbane, QLD)
Broadcast live on ABC 1 TV.
Referee: Michael Wise.
Touch judges: Steve Kanowski, Andrew Wareham.
Interchange Official: Jason King.
Video Referee: Tony Maksoud.

Skill360 Northern Pride: 1. Chey Bird – FB 2. Josh Vaughan – WG 3. Rod Jensen – CE 4. Jamie Frizzo – CE 5. Germaine Paulson – WG 6. Tom Humble – FE 7. Chris Sheppard (c) – HB 8. Ben Laity – PR 9. Jason Roos – HK 10. Alex Starmer – PR 11. Nick Slyney* – SR 12. Mark Cantoni – SR 13. Joel Riethmuller – LK
Interchange: 15. Greg Byrnes, 16. Chris Riesen, 17. Rod Griffin, 18. Brandon Boor*.
* = Cowboys allocation.
Unavailable: Luke Harlen (hand).
Central Comets: 1. Tom Hewitt, 2. Matt Sing, 3. Karl Johnson, 4. Tyron Haynes, 5. Dallas Williams, 6. Nat Bowman, 7. Marc Fickling, 13. Mick Esdale, 12. Guy Williams, 11. Alan Rothery, 10. Aaron Summers, 9. Ian Webster, 8. George Tuakura.
Interchange: 14. Pj Marsh, 15. Jade Williams, 16. Liam Anlezark, 17. Gerard Parle.
Coach: Wayne Barnett.
- Note: Broadcast live on ABC 1 TV with ABC Sport's Gerry Collins, Warren Boland and David Wright.
  This match was supposed to be a Pride home game, but it was moved to a neutral venue as the ABC could not provide an outside broadcast unit – Report

=== Grand Final ===
Finals Week 3 - Grand Final

Saturday
12 September 2009
14:00 AEST (UTC+10)

Sunshine Coast Sea Eagles	32 – 18	Northern Pride
Tries: Shane Neumann 3 Trent Hodkinson 1 Tony Williams 1 Michael Chapman 1 Ryan Walker 1 Goals: Trent Hodkinson 2	1st: 8 – 12; 2nd: 10 – 20; QRL Report Cairns Post Report; Video Highlights	Tries: 1 Rod Jensen; 1 Tom Humble; 1 Jamie Frizzo Goals: 3 Tom Humble

Stockland Park
(Sportsmans Parade, Bokarina, Kawana Waters, QLD)
Broadcast live on ABC 1 TV
Attendance: 3,000
Referee: Clayton Sharpe
Touch judges: David Shaw, Steve Kanowski
Interchange Officials: Jason King and Tony Graham
Video Referee: Tony Maksoud
Player of the Match: Tony Williams (Sunshine Coast)

Skill360 Northern Pride: 1. Chey Bird – FB 2. Josh Vaughan – WG 3. Rod Jensen – CE 4. Jamie Frizzo – CE 5. Germaine Paulson – WG 6. Tom Humble – FE 7. Chris Sheppard (c) – HB 8. Ben Laity – PR 9. Jason Roos – HK 10. Alex Starmer – PR 11. Nick Slyney* – SR 12. Mark Cantoni – SR 13. Joel Riethmuller – LK
Interchange: 14. Luke Millwood, 15. Greg Byrnes, 16. Chris Riesen, 17. Rod Griffin, .
* = Cowboys allocation.
Unavailable: Luke Harlen (hand).
- Note: Broadcast live on ABC 1 TV with ABC Sport's Gerry Collins, Warren Boland and David Wright.

Northern Pride	Position	Sunshine Coast Sea Eagles
Chey Bird	FB	Dennis Sandow
Josh Vaughan	WG	Michael Chapman
Rod Jensen	CE	Shane Neumann
Jamie Frizzo	CE	Andrew Suniula
Germaine Paulson	WG	Ryan Walker
Tom Humble	FE	Tony Williams
Chris Sheppard (c)	HB	Trent Hodkinson
Ben Laity	PR	Phil Morwood
Jason Roos	HK	Cameron Joyce (c)
Alex Starmer	PR	Junior Palau
Nick Slyney*	SR	Vic Mauro
Mark Cantoni	SR	Jon Grieve
Joel Riethmuller	LK	Jon Muir
Luke Millwood	Bench	Tim Browne
Greg Byrnes	Bench	Rob Godfrey
Chris Reisen	Bench	Steve McPhee
Rod Griffin	Bench	Heath L'Estrange
Andrew Dunemann	Coach	Brandon Costin

The Northern Pride, who finished the regular season in second, qualified for their first Grand Final after a 22–10 win over the Central Comets in the preliminary final. They were joined by the Sunshine Coast, who finished fourth in their return season, after they defeated reigning premiers Souths Logan 30–26 in the preliminary final.

==== First half ====
The Pride opened the scoring in the fifth minute when they created a huge overlap, with centre Jamie Frizzo finishing off the play with a try. The Sunshine Coast responded quickly when five-eighth Tony Williams bumped off a defender and threw an offload to centre Shane Neumann who crossed for his first try. The Sea Eagles hit the lead in the 27th minute when winger Michael Chapman scored untouched in the corner. They scored again four minutes later when Ryan Walker scored in the opposite corner. Poor goal kicking kept the Pride in the contest, as Williams missed all three conversion attempts. The Pride converted a penalty from right in front on the stroke of half time to trail by just eight at the break.

==== Second half ====
The Sunshine Coast extended the lead to 10 in the 47th minute when Williams dived over for a try of his own. The Sea Eagles kept the points coming when Neumann dived over in the corner for his second just six minutes later. With just over 10 minutes remaining, the Pride gave themselves a chance when Rod Jensen scored and cut the Sea Eagles' lead to 10. Three minutes later, the Sunshine Coast all but sealed victory when halfback Trent Hodkinson scored close to the posts. The Pride scored a late consolation try when Humble latched onto a wayward Sea Eagles' pass and ran 80 metres to score under the uprights. In the final minute, Neumann crossed for his hat trick as the Sea Eagles' wrapped up a 14-point victory.

Tony Williams, who was awarded the Duncan Hall Medal, and second rower Vic Mauro would go onto play in the Manly Sea Eagles' 2011 NRL Grand Final win over the New Zealand Warriors.

== 2009 Northern Pride players ==
Pride player	Appearances	Tries	Goals	Field goals	Pts
Adam Mills	2	2	0	0	8
Alex Starmer	12	2	0	0	8
Ben Laity	24	0	0	0	0
Callan Myles	3	0	0	0	0
Chey Bird	20	4	36	0	88
Chris Riesen	13	4	1	0	18
Chris Sheppard	22	1	0	2	6
Drew Campbell	2	0	0	0	0
Germaine Paulson	18	7	0	0	28
Greg Byrnes	16	1	0	0	4
Gordon Rattler	2	0	0	0	0
Hezron Murgha	15	6	0	0	24
Jamie Frizzo	19	10	0	0	40
Jason Roos	19	4	0	0	16
Joel Riethmuller	24	1	0	0	4
Josh Vaughan	19	4	0	0	16
Luke Harlen	11	1	0	0	4
Luke Millwood	6	1	1	0	6
Mark Cantoni	23	7	0	0	28
Noel Underwood	6	0	0	0	0
Quincy To'oto'o-ulugia	2	0	0	0	0
Richie Marsters	2	0	0	0	0
Rod Griffin	9	2	0	0	8
Rod Jensen	24	18	0	0	72
Tom Humble	24	20	47	0	174

=== North Queensland Cowboys who played for the Pride in 2009 ===
Cowboys player	Appearances	Tries	Goals	Field goals	Pts
Brandon Boor*	18	4	0	0	16
Carl Webb*	2	0	0	0	0
Clint Amos*	1	1	0	0	4
David Pangai*	4	1	0	0	4
James Tamou*	8	0	0	0	0
John Williams*	3	2	2	0	12
Manase Manuokafoa*	8	1	0	0	4
Matthew Bartlett*	12	1	0	0	4
Nick Slyney*	23	7	0	0	28
Travis Burns*	2	1	0	0	4
Ty Williams*	6	4	0	0	16

== 2009 venues ==
Northern Pride venues

The Pride played matches at 15 different venues this year, 14 in Queensland and one in NSW:

- Pride Oval, Cairns.
- NQ Hardware Stadium, Atherton.
- Barlow Park, Cairns.
- Ned Byrne Oval, Kingscliff.
- Briggs Rd Sporting Complex, (Ipswich.
- Pizzey Park, Gold Coast.
- Albert Bishop Park, Nundah.
- Browne Park, Rockhampton.
- Davies Park, Brisbane.
- Langlands Park, Brisbane.
- Stockland Park, Sunshine Coast.
- BMD Kougari Oval, Brisbane.
- Dolphin Oval, Redcliffe.
- Mackay Junior Fields, Mackay.
- BMD Kougari Oval, Brisbane.

== 2009 Televised Games ==
In 2009 games were televised by ABC TV and shown live across Queensland through the ABC1 channel at 2.00pm (AEST) on Saturday afternoons. The commentary team was Gerry Collins, Warren Boland and David Wright.

The Round 1 match against Tweed Heads Seagulls at Cudgen Oval was scheduled to be televised, but the satellite dish needed for the link was being used for news coverage of the Moreton Island oil spill, and so ABC1 showed the match between Norths Devils and Easts Tigers instead.

The Pride appeared in five televised games this season:

- Round 5: Northern Pride lost to Burleigh Bears 10–30 at Pizzey Park, Gold Coast.
- Round 15: Northern Pride lost 18–30 to Sunshine Coast Sea Eagles at Stockland Park, Caloundra, Sunshine Coast.
- Round 18: Northern Pride beat Redcliffe Dolphins 54–24 at Dolphin Oval, Redcliffe.
- Semi-Final: Northern Pride beat Central Comets 22–10 at BMD Kougari Oval, Wynnum.
- Grand Final: Northern Pride lost to Sunshine Coast Sea Eagles 18–32 at Stockland Park, Caloundra, Sunshine Coast.
