= 2009 Queensland Cup =

- Duration: March 14 – September 12, 2009
- Teams: 12
- Premiers: Sunshine Coast Sea Eagles (1st title)
- Minor premiers: Souths Logan Magpies (1st title)
- Matches played: 138
- Points scored: 6,308
- Top points scorer: Liam Georgetown
- Player of the year: Scott Smith (Courier Mail Medal)
- Top try-scorer: Tom Humble

The 2009 Queensland Cup season was the 14th season of Queensland's top-level statewide rugby league competition run by the Queensland Rugby League. The competition, known as the Queensland Wizard Cup due to sponsorship from Wizard Home Loans featured 12 teams playing a 25-week-long season (including finals) from March to September.

The Sunshine Coast Sea Eagles, in their first season back in the competition, won their first premiership after defeating the Northern Pride 32–18 at Stockland Park. Burleigh Bears' hooker Scott Smith was named the competition's Player of the Year, winning the Courier Mail Medal.

== Teams ==
In 2009, the Queensland Cup featured 12 teams for the first time since the 2004 season. The Sunshine Coast Falcons, re-branded as the Sunshine Coast Sea Eagles, returned to the competition after the Manly Warringah Sea Eagles injected $1 million into the club and formed a partnership.

Colours	Club	Home ground(s)	Head coach(s)	Captain(s)	NRL Affiliate
	Burleigh Bears	Pizzey Park	Jim Lenihan	Scott Smith	Gold Coast Titans
	Central Comets	Browne Park	Wayne Barnett	Nat Bowman	Brisbane Broncos
	Easts Tigers	Langlands Park	Darren Smith → Jason Gainey	Ben Vaeau	Brisbane Broncos
	Ipswich Jets	Briggs Rd Sporting Complex	Glenn Lazarus	Danny Coburn	Gold Coast Titans
	Mackay Cutters	Mackay JRL Grounds	Shane Muspratt	Jardine Bobongie	North Queensland Cowboys
	Northern Pride	Barlow Park	Andrew Dunemann	Chris Sheppard	North Queensland Cowboys
	Norths Devils	Bishop Park	Mark Gee → Kevin Carmichael	Mark Leafa	Brisbane Broncos
	Redcliffe Dolphins	Dolphin Oval	Gary O'Brien	Danny Burke	Brisbane Broncos
	Souths Logan Magpies	Meakin Park, Davies Park	Paul Bramley	Phil Dennis	Canberra Raiders
	Sunshine Coast Sea Eagles	Stockland Park	Brandon Costin	Cameron Joyce	Manly Warringah Sea Eagles
	Tweed Heads Seagulls	Ned Byrne Field	Steve Anderson → Steve Lacey	Brad Davis	Gold Coast Titans
	Wynnum Manly Seagulls	BMD Kougari Oval	Shane McNally	Darren Bain	Brisbane Broncos

== Ladder ==
2009 Queensland Cup
Pos	Team	Pld	W	D	L	PF	PA	PD	Pts
1	Souths Logan Magpies	22	16	0	6	711	434	+277	32
2	Northern Pride	22	14	0	8	564	445	+119	28
3	Central Comets	22	13	0	9	508	499	+9	26
4	Sunshine Coast Sea Eagles (P)	22	12	1	9	562	508	+54	25
5	Norths Devils	22	11	0	11	559	524	+35	22
6	Tweed Heads Seagulls	22	11	0	11	525	515	+10	22
7	Burleigh Bears	22	11	0	11	445	517	-72	22
8	Ipswich Jets	22	9	1	12	455	454	+1	19
9	Easts Tigers	22	9	1	12	451	548	-97	19
10	Wynnum Manly Seagulls	22	9	0	13	484	548	-64	18
11	Redcliffe Dolphins	22	7	2	13	472	518	-46	16
12	Mackay Cutters	22	7	1	14	315	541	-226	15

== Final series ==
In 2009, after using a five-team finals series for 10 years, the Queensland Cup used a six-team system. The competition used a six-team format from 1996 to 1998, although the system used in 2009 was two weeks shorter.

Home	Score	Away	Match Information
Home	Score	Away	Date and Time (local)	Venue
Semi-finals
Souths Logan Magpies	16 – 8	Tweed Heads Seagulls	29 August 2009, 2:00pm	Meakin Park
Central Comets	21 – 14	Sunshine Coast Sea Eagles	29 August 2009, 7:00pm	Browne Park
Northern Pride	44 – 16	Norths Devils	29 August 2009, 8:00pm	Barlow Park
Preliminary Finals
Northern Pride	22 – 10	Central Comets	5 September 2009, 2:00pm	Kougari Oval
Souths Logan Magpies	26 – 30	Sunshine Coast Sea Eagles	5 September 2009, 3:00pm	Meakin Park
Grand Final
Northern Pride	18 – 32	Sunshine Coast Sea Eagles	12 September 2009, 2:00pm	Stockland Park

== Grand Final ==
Saturday, 13 September

Northern Pride	18 – 32	Sunshine Coast Sea Eagles
Tries: Jamie Frizzo 1 Tom Humble 1 Rod Jensen 1 Goals: Tom Humble 3	1st: 8 - 12; 2nd: 10 - 20; Report	Tries: 3 Shane Neumann; 1 Michael Chapman; 1 Trent Hodkinson; 1 Ryan Walker; 1 Tony Williams; Goals: 2 Trent Hodkinson

Stockland Park
Attendance: 3,000
Referee: Clayton Sharpe
Player of the Match: Tony Williams (Sunshine Coast)

Northern Pride	Position	Sunshine Coast Sea Eagles
1. Chey Bird	FB	1. Dennis Sandow
2. Josh Vaughan	WG	2. Michael Chapman
3. Rod Jensen	CE	3. Shane Neumann
4. Jamie Frizzo	CE	4. Andrew Suniula
5. Germaine Paulson	WG	5. Ryan Walker
6. Tom Humble	FE	6. Tony Williams
7. Chris Sheppard (c)	HB	7. Trent Hodkinson
8. Ben Laity	PR	8. Phil Morwood
9. Jason Roos	HK	9. Cameron Joyce (c)
10. Alex Starmer	PR	10. Junior Palau
11. Nick Slyney	SR	11. Vic Mauro
12. Mark Cantoni	SR	12. Jon Grieve
13. Joel Riethmuller	LK	13. Jon Muir
14. Luke Millwood	Bench	14. Tim Browne
15. Greg Byrnes	Bench	16. Rob Godfrey
16. Chris Reisen	Bench	18. Steve McPhee
17. Rod Griffin	Bench	19. Heath L'Estrange
Andrew Dunemann	Coach	Brandon Costin

The Northern Pride, who finished the regular season in second, qualified for their first Grand Final after a 22–10 win over the Central Comets in the preliminary final. They were joined by the Sunshine Coast, who finished fourth in their return season, after they defeated reigning premiers Souths Logan 30–26 in the preliminary final.

=== First half ===
The Pride opened the scoring in the fifth minute when they created a huge overlap, with centre Jamie Frizzo finishing off the play with a try. The Sunshine Coast responded quickly when five-eighth Tony Williams bumped off a defender and threw an offload to centre Shane Neumann who crossed for his first try. The Sea Eagles hit the lead in the 27th minute when winger Michael Chapman scored untouched in the corner. They scored again four minutes later when Ryan Walker scored in the opposite corner. Poor goal kicking kept the Pride in the contest, as Williams missed all three conversion attempts. The Pride converted a penalty from right in front on the stroke of half time to trail by just eight at the break.

=== Second half ===
The Sunshine Coast extended the lead to 10 in the 47th minute when Williams dived over for a try of his own. The Sea Eagles kept the points coming when Neumann dived over in the corner for his second just six minutes later. With just over 10 minutes remaining, the Pride gave themselves a chance when Rod Jensen scored and cut the Sea Eagles' lead to 10. Three minutes later, the Sunshine Coast all but sealed victory when halfback Trent Hodkinson scored close to the posts. The Pride scored a late consolation try when Humble latched onto a wayward Sea Eagles' pass and ran 80 metres to score under the uprights. In the final minute, Neumann crossed for his hat trick as the Sea Eagles' wrapped up a 14-point victory.

Tony Williams, who was awarded the Duncan Hall Medal, and second rower Vic Mauro would go onto play in the Manly Sea Eagles' 2011 NRL Grand Final win over the New Zealand Warriors.

== End-of-season awards ==
- Courier Mail Medal (Best and Fairest): Scott Smith ( Burleigh Bears)
- QANTAS Player of the Year (Coaches Award): Ian Lacey ( Ipswich Jets)
- Coach of the Year: Paul Bramley ( Souths Logan Magpies)
- Rookie of the Year: Matt Gillett ( Norths Devils)
- Representative Player of the Year: Scott Smith ( Queensland Residents, Burleigh Bears)

== See also ==
- Queensland Cup
- Queensland Rugby League
