= Andrew Dunemann =

Australian RL coach and former rugby league footballer

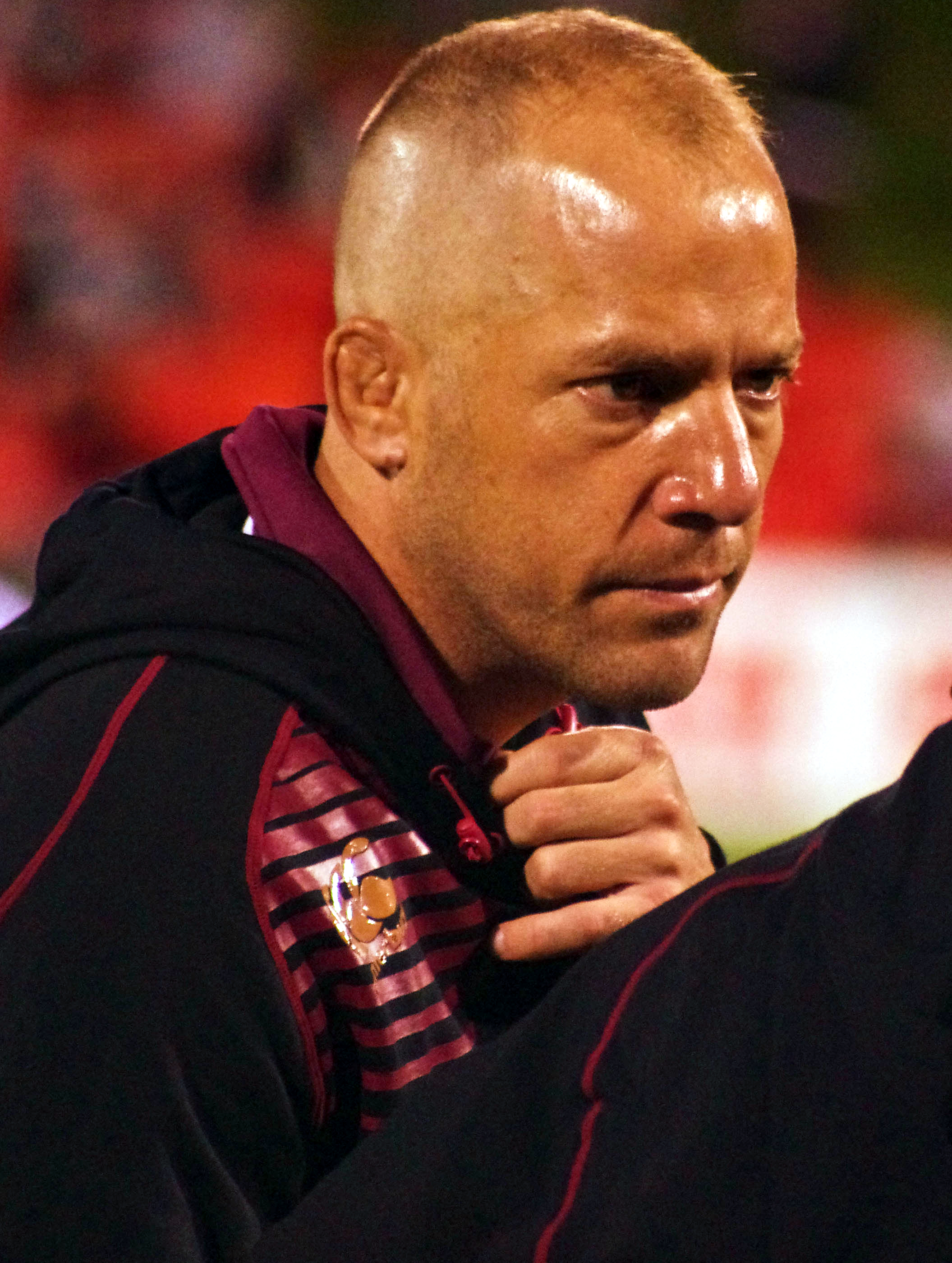

Personal information
- Full name: Andrew Dunemann
- Born: 10 June 1976 (age 50) Brisbane, Queensland, Australia

Playing information
- Height: 178 cm (5 ft 10 in)
- Weight: 99 kg (15 st 8 lb)
- Position: Five-eighth, Halfback, Hooker
Club
| Years | Team | Pld | T | G | FG | P |
|---|---|---|---|---|---|---|
| 1993–95 | Gold Coast Seagulls | 20 | 1 | 0 | 0 | 4 |
| 1996–98 | North Qld Cowboys | 51 | 8 | 3 | 4 | 42 |
| 1999 | South Sydney | 5 | 1 | 0 | 0 | 4 |
| 1999–02 | Halifax Blue Sox | 74 | 19 | 0 | 2 | 78 |
| 2003–05 | Leeds Rhinos | 93 | 11 | 0 | 2 | 46 |
| 2006 | Salford City Reds | 27 | 1 | 0 | 2 | 6 |
| 2007 | Canberra Raiders | 2 | 0 | 0 | 0 | 0 |
| | Total | 272 | 41 | 3 | 10 | 180 |

Coaching information
Club
| Years | Team | Gms | W | D | L | W% |
| 2008–09 | Northern Pride | 48 | 30 | 0 | 18 | 63 |
| 2013 | Canberra Raiders | 3 | 0 | 0 | 3 | 0 |
| | Total | 51 | 30 | 0 | 21 | 59 |
- Relatives: Ian Dunemann (brother)

Andrew Dunemann (born 6 October 1976) is an Australian former professional rugby league footballer and coach who played in the 1990s and 2000s.

Primarily a five-eighth, he played for the Gold Coast Seagulls, North Queensland Cowboys, South Sydney Rabbitohs and the Canberra Raiders in the NRL, and Halifax, Leeds Rhinos and the Salford City Reds in the Super League. After spending most of his career in the halves he spent some time later in his career as a hooker.

== Background ==
Born in Brisbane, Dunemann grew up in Toowoomba, where he played his junior rugby league for the Newtown Lions and attended Harristown State High School. In 1992, he started at five-eighth in Harristown's 16–17 Commonwealth Bank Cup final loss to Patrician Brothers' College, Fairfield, winning the competition's Player of the Tournament award.

== Playing career ==
In Round 18 of the 1993 NSWRL season, at age 16 years and 299 days old, Dunemann made his first grade debut for the Gold Coast Seagulls in their 16–46 loss to the North Sydney Bears. This was his only appearance for the Seagulls that season. In 1994, he played six games, starting five at five-eighth. In 1995, he became more of a regular in the side playing 13 games, scoring his first try in a 20–27 loss to the Newcastle Knights.

In 1996, Dunemann signed with the North Queensland Cowboys, joining his older brother Ian at the club. In Round 10 of the 1996 ARL season, he made his debut for the club, playing alongside his brother in a 14–38 loss to the Sydney City Roosters. In doing so, they became the first pair of brothers to play for the club. In his first season at the Cowboys, he played 16 games. In 1997, he played 14 of the club's 18 games, starting the majority at halfback. In 1998, Dunemann's final season at the club, he played 21 games, scoring three tries.

In 1999, Dunemann joined the South Sydney Rabbitohs, playing just five games for the club before making a mid-season move to England to play for the Halifax Blue Sox in the Super League. Over three and a half seasons with the club, he played 74 games, scoring 19 tries.

In 2003, Dunemann signed with the Leeds Rhinos, starting at halfback in their Challenge Cup final loss to the Bradford Bulls. In 2004, he played 24 games for the Rhinos but was left out of their 2004 Super League Grand Final side that defeated Bradford. In February 2005, he started at hooker in Leeds' 39–32 World Club Challenge win over the Canterbury-Bankstown Bulldogs. In August 2005, he came off the bench in their Challenge Cup final loss to Hull F.C. His last game for the Rhinos was their 2005 Grand Final loss to Bradford, in which he started at hooker.

In 2006, joined the Salford City Reds, playing 25 games in his lone season at the club before returning to Australia.

In 2007, Dunemann returned to the NRL after eight years, joining the Canberra Raiders. He played two games for the club, coming off the bench in both before retiring due to injuries.

== Coaching career ==
In 2008, Dunemann became head coach of the newly established Northern Pride in the Queensland Cup. In his first season in charge, the Pride finished third and came within one game of the Grand Final. In 2009, the Pride finished second and qualified for the Grand Final, losing 18–32 to the Sunshine Coast Sea Eagles.

In 2010, Dunemann joined the Newcastle Knights, serving as an assistant to head coach Rick Stone. In 2012, after two years at Newcastle, he moved to the Canberra Raiders as an assistant coach of the NRL side and head coach of the club's under-20 side. In the National Youth Competition, he led the Raiders to the Grand Final, which they lost to the Wests Tigers.

In April 2013, Dunemann coached the Queensland under-20 team. On 20 August 2013, following the dismissal of Raiders' head coach David Furner, Dunemann was named as the club's interim head coach. After three losses from his three games, he was replaced in a full-time capacity by Ricky Stuart for the 2014 season.

== Statistics ==
=== ARL/Super League/NRL ===
| Season | Team | Matches | T | G | GK % | F/G | Pts |
|---|---|---|---|---|---|---|---|
| 1993 | Gold Coast | 1 | 0 | 0 | – | 0 | 0 |
| 1994 | Gold Coast | 6 | 0 | 0 | – | 0 | 0 |
| 1995 | Gold Coast | 13 | 1 | 0 | – | 0 | 4 |
| 1996 | North Queensland | 16 | 2 | 0 | – | 1 | 9 |
| 1997 | North Queensland | 14 | 3 | 0 | – | 2 | 14 |
| 1998 | North Queensland | 21 | 3 | 3 | 75.0 | 1 | 19 |
| 1999 | South Sydney | 5 | 1 | 0 | – | 0 | 4 |
| 2007 | Canberra | 2 | 0 | 0 | – | 0 | 0 |
| Career totals | | 78 | 10 | 3 | 75.00 | 4 | 50 |

=== Super League ===
| Season | Team | Matches | T | G | GK % | F/G | Pts |
|---|---|---|---|---|---|---|---|
| 1999 | Halifax | 3 | 1 | 0 | – | 0 | 4 |
| 2000 | Halifax | 27 | 9 | 0 | – | 0 | 36 |
| 2001 | Halifax | 15 | 2 | 0 | – | 0 | 8 |
| 2002 | Halifax | 23 | 6 | 0 | – | 1 | 25 |
| 2003 | Leeds | 27 | 4 | 0 | – | 2 | 18 |
| 2003 | Leeds | 24 | 4 | 0 | – | 0 | 16 |
| 2003 | Leeds | 29 | 3 | 0 | – | 0 | 12 |
| 2006 | Salford City | 25 | 1 | 0 | – | 2 | 6 |
| Career totals | | 173 | 30 | 0 | – | 5 | 125 |

== Post-playing ==
In 2014, Dunemann became a referee's consultant for the NRL, a position he held for four years.
