= Sunshine Coast Falcons =

Australian rugby league club, based in Sunshine Coast, QLD

Club information
- Full name: Sunshine Coast Falcons RLFC
- Nickname: Falcons
- Colours: Gold; Black
- Founded: 1996; 30 years ago

Current details
- Ground: Sunshine Coast Stadium (12,000)
- CEO: Chris Flannery
- Coach: Brad Henderson
- Captain: Patrice Siolo
- Competition: Queensland Cup (Seniors); Hastings Deering Colts (U20’s); Mal Meninga Cup (U18's); Cyril Connell Cup (U16's)
- Current season

Uniforms
| Home | Away |
- Premierships (2nd grade): 1 (2009)
- Runners-up (2nd grade): 2 (2017, 2026)
- Minor premierships (2nd grade): 1 (2026)
- Wooden spoons (2nd grade): 3 (2011, 2013, 2014)

The Sunshine Coast Falcons are a rugby league football team based on Queensland's Sunshine Coast. They compete in the Queensland Cup and their home ground is Sunshine Coast Stadium. The Falcons are currently affiliated with the NRL team Melbourne Storm.

== History ==
The Falcons were originally the Winfield State League representative team for the Sunshine Coast. First competing in the 1993 season, they won their pool before losing in the semi-finals. For the 1994 season, they competed as Sunshine Coast/Gympie, against winning the pool matches, but losing both semi-final matches. In the last year of the State League, the combined Sunshine Coast/Gympie team failed to progress from the pool stage. They competed in the first season of the Queensland Cup in 1996 but dropped out the following season.

In 2006, the club joined the FOGS Cup competing in the second-level competition. The club finished their first season in sixth position, just outside the finals positions.

=== Partnership with Manly (2009–2010) ===
In 2009, they were readmitted to the Queensland Cup after securing an agreement with the NRL's Manly Sea Eagles to become a feeder club. Between 2009 and 2013 the club was renamed the Sunshine Coast Sea Eagles due to the partnership with the Manly Sea Eagles.

The partnership instantly proved successful with the team winning the 2009 Queensland Cup Grand Final 32–18 to secure their first premiership, with a number of Manly players in the squad. Following the end of the 2010 season, Manly were forced to cut ties with the club after a change in policy disallowed NRL teams from having feeder clubs in both the Queensland Cup and New South Wales Cup.

=== Partnership with Melbourne Storm (2014–) ===
In 2014 the club reverted to the Falcons name and struck a three-year partnership with the Melbourne Storm from the 2015 season. The Falcons endured a 36-game losing streak during the 2013 and 2014 seasons, on their way to consecutive wooden spoons.

In May 2021, Melbourne extended their affiliation partnership with the Falcons to the end of the 2024 season.

=== Life Members ===
In September 2021, the club awarded the first life memberships of the club:

- Don Oxenham – Inaugural CEO and former board member
- Dave Cordwell – Coach (Colts: 2009–10; FOGs Cup: 2011; Queensland Cup: 2012–13) and former board member
- Alan Marr – Board member 2009–19
- Gordon Oakes – Chairman 2006–13

== Season Summaries ==
P=Premier, R=Runner-Up, M=Minor Premier, F=Finals appearance, W=Wooden Spoon, (Brackets represent Finals games)
| Competition | Games played | Games won | Games drawn | Games lost | Ladder Position | P | R | M | F | W | Coach | Captain | Notes |
|---|---|---|---|---|---|---|---|---|---|---|---|---|---|
| 1996 Queensland Cup | 15 | 1 | 0 | 14 | 15 / 16 | | | | | | | | |
Withdrew from Queensland Cup
| 2006 FOGS Cup | 20 | 10 | 2 | 8 | 6 / 11 | | | | | | | | |
| 2007 FOGS Cup | 20 | 4 | 2 | 14 | 10 / 11 | | | | | | | | |
| 2008 FOGS Cup | 20 | 5 | 2 | 13 | 8 / 10 | | | | | | | | |
Admitted back to Queensland Cup as Sunshine Coast Sea Eagles
| 2009 Queensland Cup | 22(3) | 12(2) | 1 | 9(1) | 4 / 12 | | | | ♦ | | Brandon Costin | Cameron Joyce | 2009 FOGS Cup - (P20 3–0–17) Finished 9/10 |
| 2010 Queensland Cup | 22(1) | 14 | 0 | 8(1) | 3 / 12 | | | | ♦ | | Brandon Costin | | 2010 FOGS Cup - (P20 8–1–11) Finished 7/10 |
| 2011 Queensland Cup | 22 | 2 | 0 | 20 | 12 / 12 | | | | | ♦ | Adam Mogg | | 2011 FOGS Cup - (P21 1–0–20) Finished 8/8 |
| 2012 Queensland Cup | 22 | 4 | 1 | 17 | 11 / 12 | | | | | | Dave Cordwell | | 2012 FOGS Cup - (P20 2–0–18) Finished 8/8 |
| 2013 Queensland Cup | 22 | 2 | 0 | 20 | 12 / 12 | | | | | ♦ | Dave Cordwell | | |
Club reverts to Sunshine Coast Falcons
| 2014 Queensland Cup | 24 | 1 | 0 | 23 | 13 / 13 | | | | | ♦ | Ivan Henjak→ Glen Dreger | Ryan Hansen | |
| 2015 Queensland Cup | 23 | 7 | 1 | 15 | 11 / 14 | | | | | | Glen Dreger | Tom Murphy | |
| 2016 Queensland Cup | 23(3) | 12(2) | 1 | 10(1) | 5 / 14 | | | | ♦ | | Craig Ingebrigtsen | Troy Giess | |
| 2017 Queensland Cup | 23(4) | 15(3) | 1 | 7(1) | 4 / 14 | | ♦ | | ♦ | | Craig Ingebrigtsen | Dane Hogan | |
| 2018 Queensland Cup | 23 | 10 | 0 | 13 | 10 / 14 | | | | | | Craig Ingebrigtsen | Dane Hogan | |
| 2019 Queensland Cup | 23(3) | 21(1) | 1 | 1(2) | 1 / 14 | | | ♦ | ♦ | | Eric Smith | Dane Hogan | |
| 2020 Queensland Cup | Season cancelled after one game (Sunshine Coast lost) due to the ongoing COVID-19 pandemic in Australia. | | | | | | | | | | Sam Mawhinney | Dane Hogan | |
| 2021 Queensland Cup | 17(1) | 9 | 0 | 8(1) | 8 / 14 | | | | ♦ | | Sam Mawhinney | Dane Hogan; Todd Murphy | |
| 2022 Queensland Cup | 19(3) | 14(1) | 1 | 5(2) | 2 / 14 | | | | ♦ | | Brad Henderson | Patrice Siolo | |
| 2023 Queensland Cup | 20(2) | 11(1) | 1 | 8(1) | 8 / 15 | | | | ♦ | | Brad Henderson | Patrice Siolo | |

== Honours ==
=== Queensland Cup ===
- Premierships: 1 (2009)
- Runners Up: 1 (2017)
- Minor Premiership: 1 (2019)
- Duncan Hall Medal: 1 (Tony Williams – 2009)
- Petero Civoniceva Medal: 1 (Daly Cherry-Evans – 2010)
- Rookie of the Year: 2 (Daly Cherry-Evans – 2010); (Brandon Smith – 2017)
- Coach of the Year: 1 (Eric Smith – 2019)

=== Junior ===
- Hastings Deering Colts: 1 (2019)

== Players ==
=== Representatives ===
The following players have played representative football for the Queensland Residents in the annual match against NSW Residents while playing for the Falcons.

- Trent Hodkinson (2009)
- Daly Cherry-Evans (2010 - captain)
- Jamie Buhrer (2010)
- Ben Hampton (2015)
- Kenny Bromwich (2015)
- Jahrome Hughes (2017)
- Lachlan Timm (2018)
- Tino Fa'asuamaleaui (2019)
- Darryn Schonig (2019)

== Awards ==
The James Ackerman Medal is awarded to the Sunshine Coast Falcons Player of the Year. The award is named in honour of the late James Ackerman, who died from injuries sustained in a tackle while playing for the Falcons against Norths Devils in 2015.

Annual Player of the Year Awards
| | Queensland Cup | | | | | | Colts | | | |
|---|---|---|---|---|---|---|---|---|---|---|
| Year | James Ackerman Medal | Best Back | Best Forward | Player's Player | Rookie of the Year | Man of Steel | Player of the Year | Best Back | Best Forward | Man of Steel |
| 2015 | Tom Murphy | Kurt Mann | Johnny Vuetibau | — | — | Travis Robinson | Sam Burns | — | — | Sam Burns |
| 2016 | Ryley Jacks | Alex Bishop | Troy Giess | — | — | — | Devlin Long | Alex Copelin | Beau Fermor | — |
| 2017 | Jon Grieve | Guy Hamilton | Dane Hogan | — | Matt Soper-Lawler | Guy Hamilton; Jye Ballinger | Stephen Buckley | Baylee Byrne Perrett | Damian Forde-Hurrell | Damian Forde-Hurrell |
| 2018 | Dane Hogan | Justin Olam | Chris Lewis | — | Caleb Daunt | — | Stephen Buckley | Riley Moore | Damian Forde-Hurrell | — |
| 2019 | Harry Grant | Todd Murphy | Chris Lewis | — | Nat McGavin | — | Tyson Smoothy | Jack Wright | Wyatt Reynolds | Kane Jackson |
| 2020 | Season cancelled due to the ongoing COVID-19 pandemic in Australia | | | | | | | | | |
| 2021 | Patrice Siolo | Luke Polselli | Tom Rafter | Todd Murphy | Jack Wright | — | Kaleb Sutton | Kane Jackson | Sam Reid | — |
| 2022 | Luke Polselli | Tyran Wishart | Tyson Smoothy | Tyson Smoothy | Kane Jackson | — | Danny Heenan | Lucas Bell | Kaleb Sutton | — |
| 2023 | Max Bailey | Scott Galeano | Chris Lewis | Max Bailey | Danny Heenan | — | Blake Woodford | Mason Peut | Blake Woodford | Blake Woodford |
| 2024 | Sam Burns | Luke Polselli | Caius Faatili | Zac Miles | Thallon Peters | — | | | | |

== Personnel ==
| Name | Positions |
|---|---|
| Chris Flannery | CEO |
| Brad Henderson | Head coach |
| Dan Murphey | Assistant coach |
| Ben McBryde | Assistant coach |

=== Coaches ===
- 2009 – 2010 — Brandon Costin
- 2011 — Adam Mogg
- 2012 – 2013 — Dave Cordwell
- 2014 — Ivan Henjak (quit midseason, replaced by Glen Dreger)
- 2015 — Glen Dreger
- 2016 – 2018 — Craig Ingebrigtsen
- 2019 — Eric Smith
- 2020 – 2021 — Sam Mawhinney
- 2022 – present – Brad Henderson

== Name, logo and colours ==
The Falcons historic colours have been black and gold however when the Manly Sea Eagles announced their partnership with the Falcons the club rebranded to become the Sunshine Coast Sea Eagles and the colours changed to Manly's colours of maroon and white. When the feeder arrangement ended the club continued with the name but changed the colours to blue and white. However fans and players on the Sunshine Coast called for a return to the clubs traditional name and colours and in the 2014 season the club complied, rebranding back to the Falcons with gold and black colours.

Sunshine Coast – Logos

Before 2008

2008-10
During link with Manly

2011-13

2014–present

== Stadium ==
The Falcons home ground is Sunshine Coast Stadium, located in Kawana Waters.

In both 2020 and 2021, Falcons' affiliated NRL club Melbourne Storm were forced to relocate to the Sunshine Coast Stadium due to the ongoing COVID-19 pandemic in Australia.

== Major Sponsors ==
- Vantage Homes Queensland
- Sunshine Toyota
- South East Civil
- Bebrok Excavations
- Sunshine Coast Council
- FC Lawyers
- Green RV
- North Coast Foods
- Go Turf
- Southern Cross Sheds
- Maroochy RSL
- Pacific Office Solutions
- Channel 9
- Sea FM
- Sunshine Coast Daily
- Asset Electrical Contractors
- Headland Plumbing & Drainage
- L & H Electrical
- Subway

== See also ==
- National Rugby League reserves affiliations
