= Dane Hogan =

Australian rugby league footballer

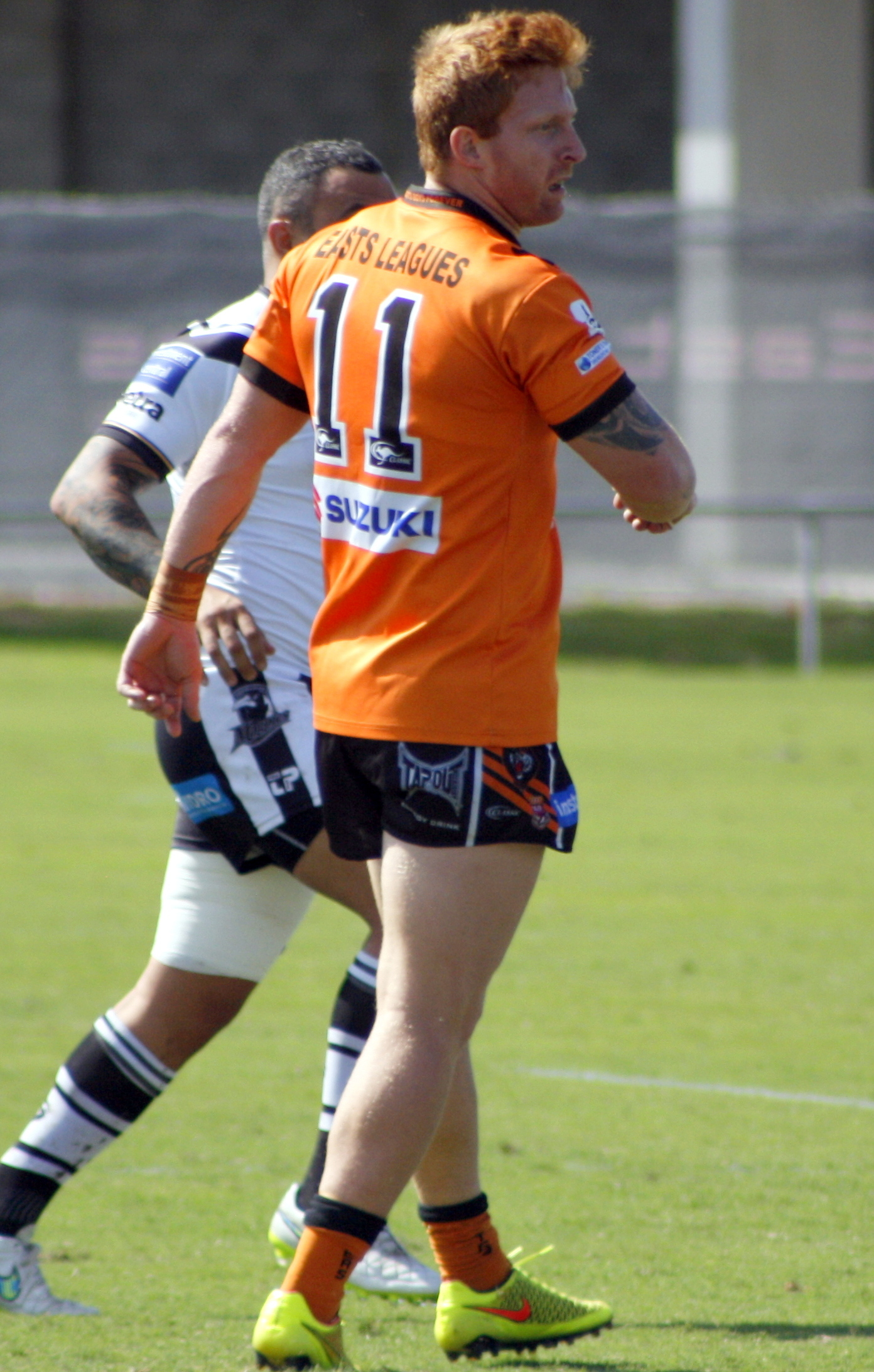

Personal information
- Full name: Dane Hogan
- Born: 3 July 1989 (age 35); Brisbane, Queensland, Australia
- Height: 185 cm (6 ft 1 in)
- Weight: 98 kg (15 st 6 lb)

Playing information
- Position: Lock, Second-row, Prop
Club
Years	Team	Pld	T	G	FG	P
2010–12	North Qld Cowboys	10	1	0	0	4
Representative
Years	Team	Pld	T	G	FG	P
2014	Queensland Residents	1	0	0	0	0
- Source: As of 6 January 2024

Dane Hogan (born 3 July 1989) is an Australian professional rugby league footballer who plays as a lock for the Sunshine Coast Falcons in the Queensland Cup (QRL).

== Background ==
Hogan was born in Brisbane, Queensland, Australia

He played his junior rugby league for the Bribie Island Warrigals & Beachmere Pelicans where he won the Sunshine Coast competition U14 player of the year and represented the Australian Schoolboys at under-15s level and Queensland as an under-16. He moved to Sydney to sign professionally for the St George Dragons, before returning to Queensland to join the North Queensland Cowboys in 2008, where he was a member of the Under 20 team. He was named the youth team's player of the season in 2009 and made his first-grade début for the Cowboys the following season.

== Playing career ==
Hogan made his NRL debut for North Queensland in round 9 of the 2010 NRL season against the Sydney Roosters. He went on to play ten matches that season. In his last two seasons with the club Hogan failed to make another appearance for the North Queenslanders after an injury-plagued season in 2011. In 2012, despite showing consistent form in the Queensland Cup, Hogan failed to play a single match for the club, with Gavin Cooper, Glenn Hall, Dallas Johnson, Jason Taumalolo, Joel Reithmuller and Cory Paterson all ahead of him in the clubs pecking order for back-rowers. In 2013, Hogan joined Queensland Cup outfit Easts Tigers. Hogan remained at Eastern Suburbs until the end of 2016. Hogan then signed on to play for the Sunshine Coast making 67 appearances between 2017-2021.
