= David Pangai =

Tonga international rugby league footballer

Personal information
- Born: 21 September 1988 (age 38) Tonga

Playing information
Representative
Years	Team	Pld	T	G	FG	P
2006	Tonga	2	2	3	0	14
- Relatives: Mosese Pangai (brother); Tevita Pangai Junior (brother)

David Pangai (Tongan: Tēvita Pangai) (born 21 September 1988 in Tonga) is a Tongan rugby league footballer who played his club football for the Belrose Eagles in the Jim Beam Cup and for the Northern Pride in the Queensland Cup.

In October 2005, Pangai played for the Tonga national rugby league team in a match against Samoa. In September 2006, Pangai represented Tonoa in their World cup qualifying match against the Cook Islands. Pangai was part of the Tongan squad for the 2006 Federation Shield competition and played in a midweek friendly match against Cumbria
