= Mark Cantoni =

Australian rugby league footballer

Personal information
- Born: 29 May 1979 (age 46)
- Height: 188 cm (6 ft 2 in)
- Weight: 98 kg (15 st 6 lb; 216 lb)

Playing information
- Position: Second-row
Club
Years	Team	Pld	T	G	FG	P
	Baroudeurs de Pia XIII	0	0	0	0	0
	Northern Pride
	Total	0	0	0	0	0
Representative
Years	Team	Pld	T	G	FG	P
2007–13	United States	4	2	0	0	8
2009	Queensland Residents	1	1	0	0	4
- Source: As of 5 January 2024

Mark Cantoni (born May 29, 1979) is a former rugby league footballer for the Pia Donkeys in the Elite One Championship and Northern Pride in the Queensland Cup rugby league football competition. He has represented the Queensland Country side and the United States national rugby league team. His position is at second row. Nicknamed Yank, as he played with the USA international Rugby League Team.
