= Germaine Paulson =

Australian rugby league footballer

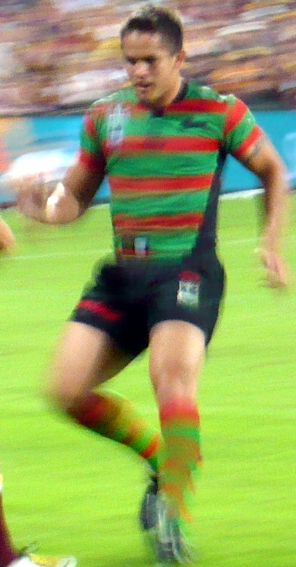
- Germaine Paulson in April 2008

Personal information
- Full name: Germaine Paulson
- Born: 15 February 1985 (age 41) Beaudesert, Queensland, Australia

Playing information
- Height: 178 cm (5 ft 10 in)
- Weight: 86 kg (13 st 8 lb)
- Position: Centre, Wing
Club
Years	Team	Pld	T	G	FG	P
2006–08	South Sydney	17	3	0	0	12

Germaine Paulson (born 15 February 1985) is an Australian former professional rugby league footballer who played for the South Sydney Rabbitohs in the 2006 and 2008 NRL seasons as a Centre and Wing.

== Background ==
Paulson was born in Beaudesert, Queensland and is of Indigenous descent, being a member of the Mununjali clan.

== Playing career ==
Paulson made his first grade debut for South Sydney against the New Zealand Warriors in round 7 2006 which ended in a 46-14 loss. South Sydney went on to finish last in 2006 claiming the wooden spoon.

Paulson's final game in first grade was a 28–24 victory over North Queensland in round 8 in 2008.

Paulson also made 24 appearances for the North Sydney Bears in the NSW Cup who were the feeder team for South Sydney at the time.
