= Vic Mauro =

Italy international rugby league footballer

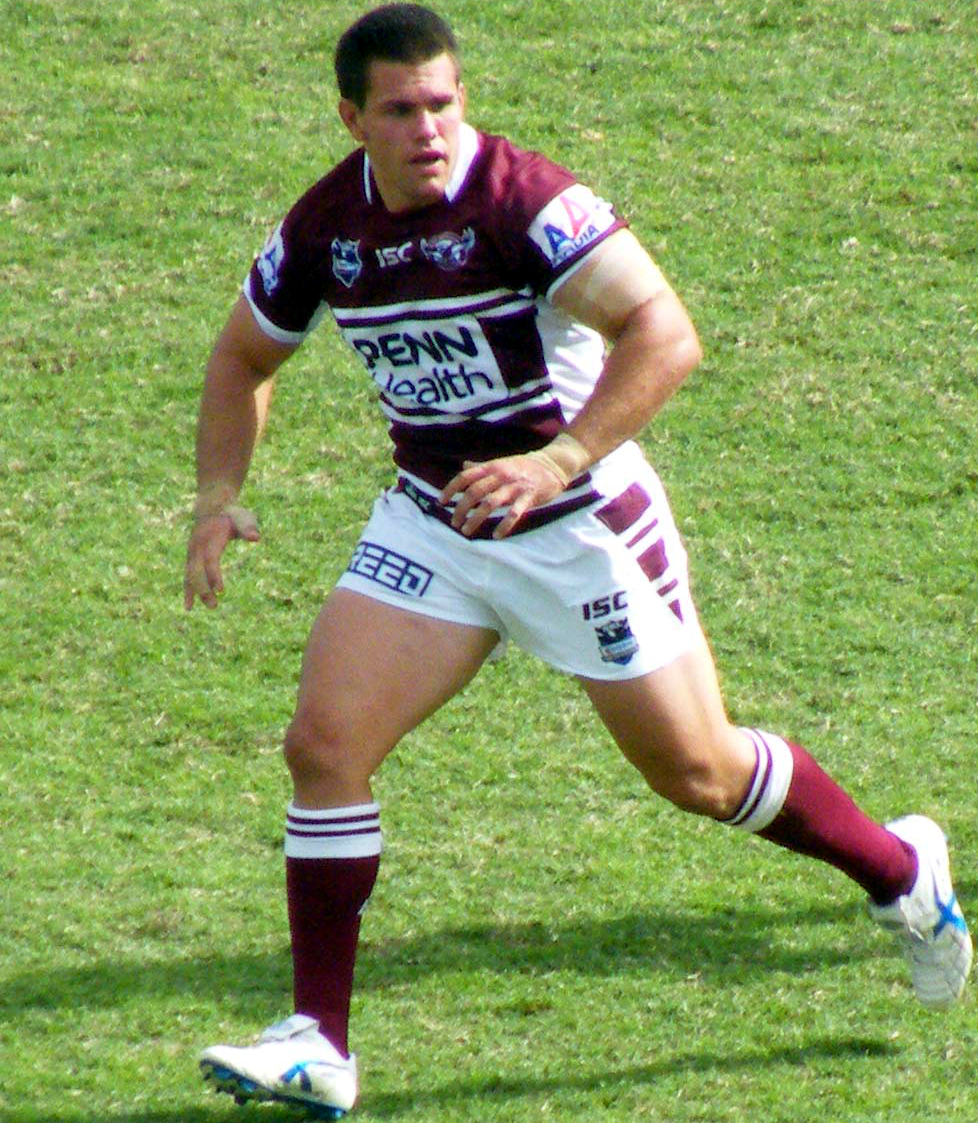

Personal information
- Full name: Vitaliano Mauro
- Born: 24 March 1987 (age 39) Sydney, New South Wales, Australia

Playing information
- Height: 1.79 m (5 ft 10 in)
- Weight: 102 kg (16 st 1 lb)
- Position: Lock, Second-row
Club
Years	Team	Pld	T	G	FG	P
2007–12	Manly Sea Eagles	47	1	0	0	4
2013	Salford City Reds	9	2	0	0	8
	Total	56	3	0	0	12
Representative
Years	Team	Pld	T	G	FG	P
2011	Italy	2	0	0	0	0

Vitaliano "Vic" Mauro (born 24 March 1987) is a former Italy international rugby league footballer who played for the Manly Warringah Sea Eagles in the National Rugby League and the Salford City Reds in the Super League. He played as a lock and can also play as a second-rower.

== Background ==
Mauro was born in Sydney, New South Wales, Australia.

Of Italian heritage, Mauro attended St. Paul's Catholic College and played junior football for the North Curl Curl Knights club in the Manly junior region.

== Playing career ==
He made his first grade début for Manly-Warringah against the New Zealand Warriors at Mount Smart Stadium in 2007, and played 47 first grade games for the Manly club.

In 2011 he was announced as a member of the Italian side that competed in the 2013 World Cup qualifying. He made his début in a 52–6 win against Serbia.

On 2 October, Mauro was part of the Manly team that defeated the New Zealand Warriors in the 2011 NRL Grand Final.

Mauro signed with Salford City Reds after being released from Manly on 1 February 2013. He was released by the club on 24 July 2013, after playing in nine games.
