= Tony Williams (rugby league) =

Australia and Tonga international rugby league footballer

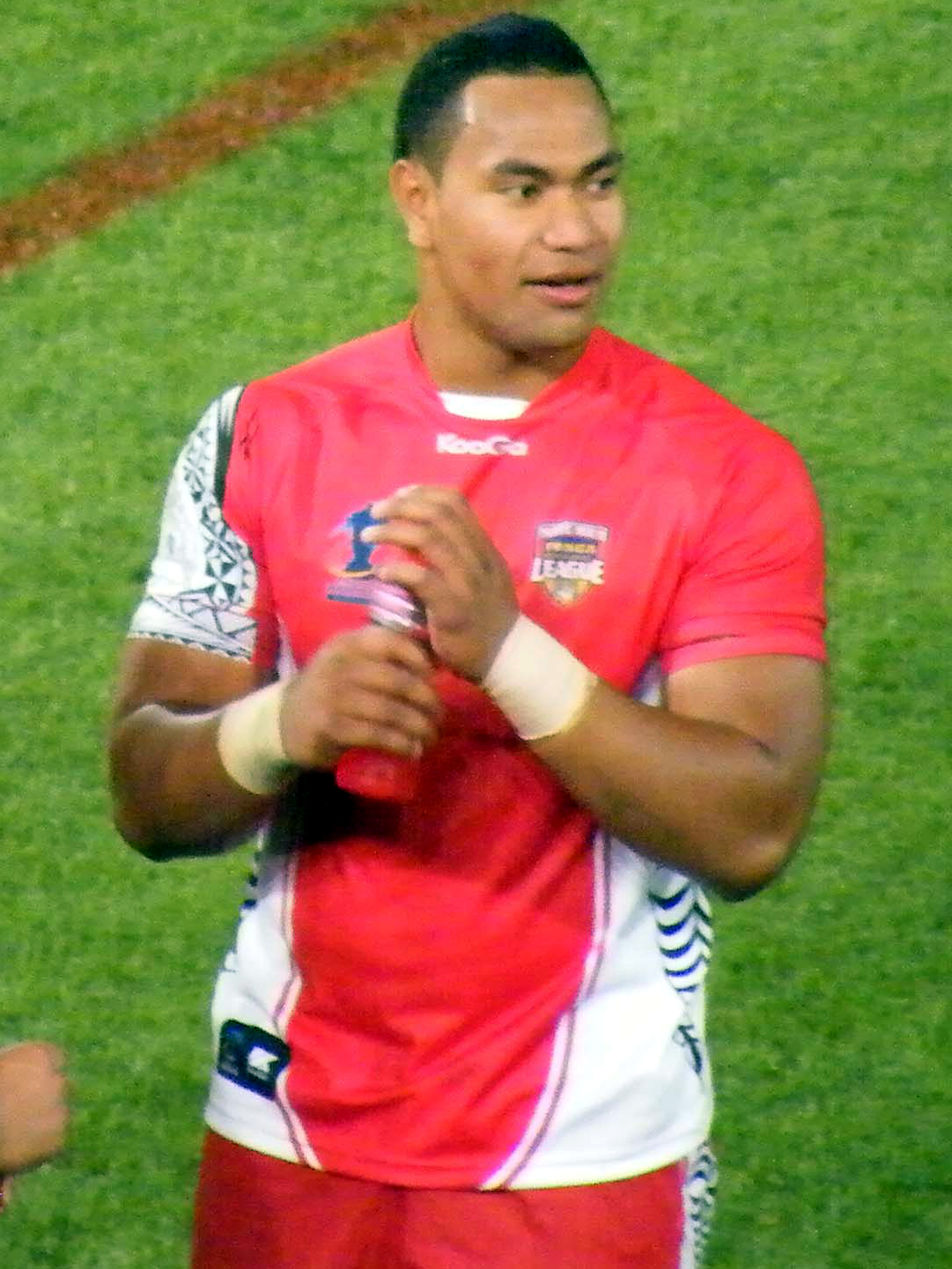

Personal information
- Born: 12 December 1988 (age 37) Canterbury, New South Wales, Australia
- Height: 193 cm (6 ft 4 in)
- Weight: 118 kg (18 st 8 lb)

Playing information
- Position: Second-row, Wing
Club
Years	Team	Pld	T	G	FG	P
2008	Parramatta Eels	11	4	0	0	16
2009–12	Manly Sea Eagles	74	35	0	0	140
2013–16	Canterbury Bulldogs	80	10	0	0	40
2017	Cronulla Sharks	1	1	0	0	4
2018	Parramatta Eels	5	0	0	0	0
	Total	171	50	0	0	200
Representative
Years	Team	Pld	T	G	FG	P
2008–17	Tonga	5	1	10	0	24
2010	Prime Minister's XIII	1	0	0	0	0
2011–12	Australia	3	7	0	0	8
2012–14	New South Wales	3	0	0	0	0
2013–14	NSW City	2	0	0	0	0
- Source: As of 29 April 2021

Tony Williams (born 12 December 1988), also known by the nickname of "T-Rex", is a former professional rugby league footballer. He played for both Tonga and Australia at international level.

He played for the Parramatta Eels, Manly Warringah Sea Eagles, where he won the 2011 NRL Grand Final, the Canterbury-Bankstown Bulldogs and the Cronulla-Sutherland Sharks in the National Rugby League. He has also played for the Blacktown Workers Sea Eagles in the Canterbury Cup NSW. He played on the wing and as a centre earlier in his career. Williams played for NSW City Origin and New South Wales in the State of Origin series.

== Background ==
Williams was born in Sydney, New South Wales, Australia and is of Tongan descent. He grew up in Liverpool for the majority of his life in his family home and attended Liverpool Boys High School and Westfields Sports High School.

He played his junior rugby league for the Cabramatta Two Blues. He was then signed by the Parramatta Eels.

== Playing career ==
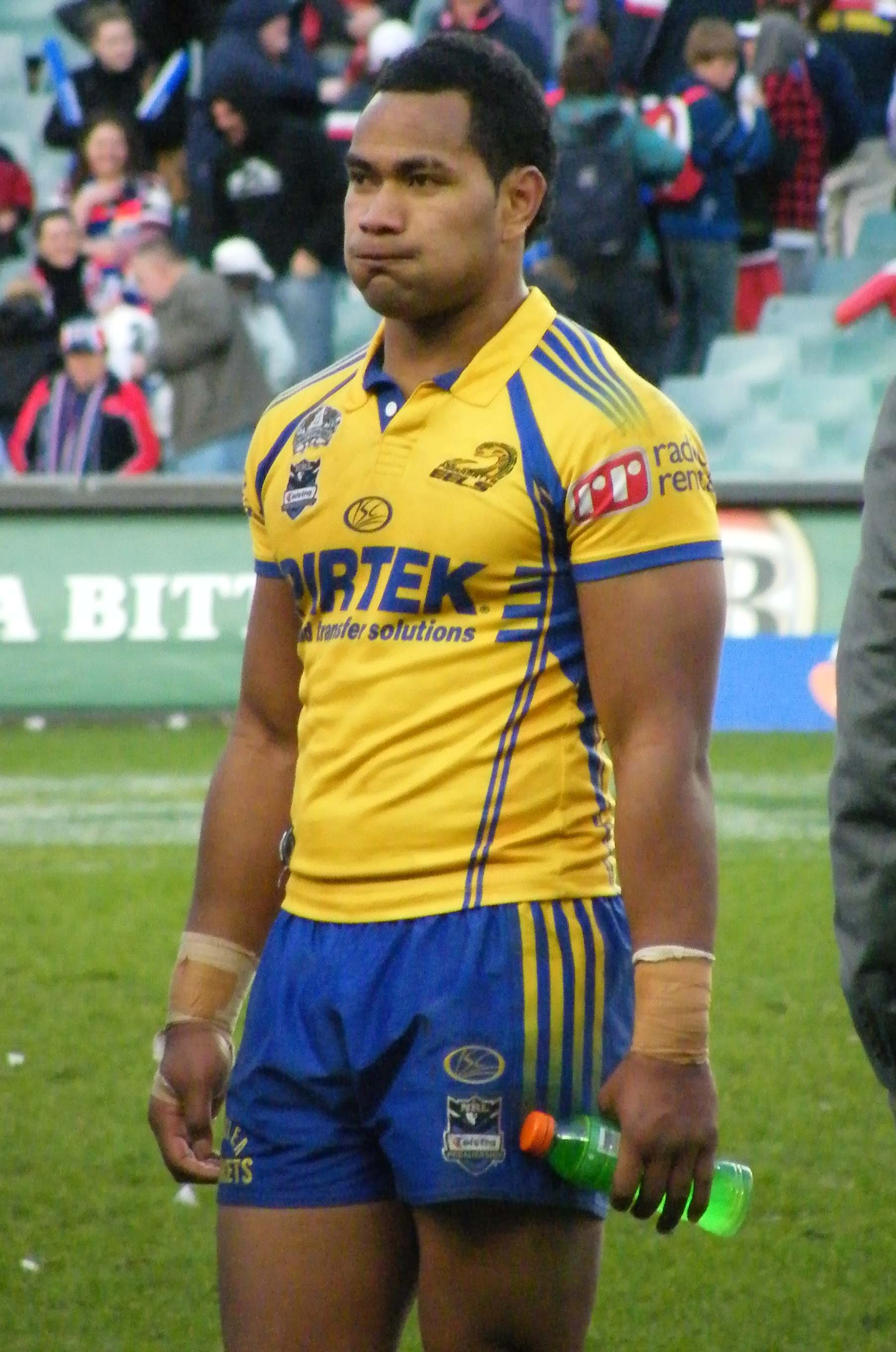
Williams playing for Parramatta in 2008

=== 2008 ===
Williams started the 2008 season playing in the Parramatta Eels NYC team and signed with Manly-Warringah Sea Eagles on 27 May 2008, a week before making his NRL debut. In Round 13 of the 2008 NRL season, Williams made his NRL debut for the Parramatta Eels against the Canberra Raiders, playing on the wing in the Eels 30–12 win at Parramatta Stadium. In Round 15 against the Cronulla-Sutherland Sharks, Williams scored his first NRL career try in the Eels 16–14 loss at Remondis Stadium. On 3 September 2008, Williams was named at centre in the 2008 NYC Team of the Year. Williams finished his debut year in the NRL with him playing in 10 matches and scoring 4 tries for the Parramatta Eels in the 2008 NRL season. Williams was named in the Tongan squad for the 2008 World Cup where he not only played lock but also took on the responsibility of being the Tongan goal kicker with success. Williams played in 3 matches, scored 1 try and kicked 10 goals.

=== 2009 ===
In Round 5 of the 2009 NRL season, Williams made his club debut for the Manly-Warringah Sea Eagles against the Wests Tigers at centre in the Sea Eagles 23–10 win at Brookvale Oval. In Round 11 against the Gold Coast Titans, Williams scored his first club try for the Sea Eagles in the 18–17 loss at Cbus Super Stadium. Williams played some of the year in the Queensland Cup playing for the Sunshine Coast Sea Eagles being awarded the Duncan Hall Medal after being judged the grand final's best-and-fairest player, scoring a try in the Sea Eagles 32–18 win over Northern Pride. Williams finished the 2009 NRL season with him playing in 12 matches and scoring 9 tries in his first year with the Manly-Warringah Sea Eagles.

=== 2010 ===
Williams finished the 2010 NRL season with him being the top-scorer for the Sea Eagles with 16 tries in all of their 25 matches. Williams was selected in the New Zealand national rugby league team squad for the 2010 Four Nations. However, Williams declared his desire to play for both Australia and New South Wales. Williams was selected to play for the Prime Minister's XIII against Papua New Guinea on the wing in the 30–18 win in Port Moresby.

=== 2011 ===
Williams played in the centres for the first two games of the 2011 season and then missed the next 3 through injury. When he returned to the side, Manly coach Des Hasler permanently moved Williams from the wing to the second-row and his form blossomed. Over his next 18 games, Williams started from the interchange bench 12 times and in the second-row row 6 times, including starting in the Sea Eagles 2011 NRL Grand Final 24–10 win over the New Zealand Warriors on 2 October 2011. Williams finished the 2011 NRL season with him playing in 20 matches and scoring 6 tries for the Sea Eagles. At the end of the 2011 season, Williams shoulder charge on North Queensland Cowboys forward Tariq Sims at Townsville's Dairy Farmers Stadium in Round 8 was featured on the NRL's official website as one of the "Best shoulder charges of 2011". Following Manly's Grand Final win, Williams was named in Australia's 2011 Four Nations squad. Williams made his test debut off the bench for Australia in a test against New Zealand in the Kangaroos 42–6 win at Hunter Stadium. Williams scored his first international for Australia against New Zealand in the Kangaroos 26–12 win at Halliwell Jones Stadium. Williams played in 4 matches and scored 2 tries, including playing off the interchange bench in the Four National final against England in the Kangaroos 30–8 win at Elland Road.

=== 2012 ===
In Round 3 against the Cronulla-Sutherland Sharks at Remondis Stadium, Williams was suspended for 7 matches for dangerous tackle on the Sharks hooker, Isaac De Gois, in the Sea Eagles 17–4 loss. When Williams returned from suspension he was selected in the New South Wales State of Origin squad. Williams made his origin debut in Game 1 off the interchange bench in the 18–10 loss at Etihad Stadium. Williams missed selection with a back injury for Game 2 but selected in Game 3 off the interchange bench in the 21–20 loss at Suncorp Stadium, resulting in Queensland winning the 2011 State of Origin series. On 4 June 2012, Williams confirmed he had signed with the Canterbury-Bankstown Bulldogs on a $650,000 a year, 4-year deal through to the end of the 2016 season. Williams finished the 2012 NRL season with him played in 16 matches and scoring 4 tries in his final year with the Manly-Warringah Sea Eagles. Williams was selected for Australia in the October Trans-Tasman test against New Zealand, playing off the interchange bench in the 18–10 win at 1300SMILES Stadium.

=== 2013 ===
In Round 1 of the 2013 NRL season, Williams made his club debut for the Canterbury-Bankstown Bulldogs against the North Queensland Cowboys at second-row in the Bulldogs 24–12 loss at Central Coast Stadium. In Round 8 against the Wests Tigers, Williams scored his first club try for the Bulldogs in the 40–4 win at ANZ Stadium. Williams was selected for NSW City at second-row in the 18–12 loss to NSW Country at Coffs Harbour. In Round 20 against the Parramatta Eels, Williams played his 100th NRL career match in the Bulldogs 40–12 win at ANZ Stadium. Williams was heavily criticised in 2013 with his form being branded lazy and not being worth $650,000 a year. Williams finished his first year with the Canterbury-Bankstown Bulldogs with him playing in 23 matches and scoring 5 tries in the 2013 NRL season.

=== 2014 ===
In February 2014, Williams was selected in the Bulldogs 2014 Auckland Nines squad. Williams was selected to play for NSW City in the City vs Country Origin at second-row in the 26-all draw at Dubbo. Williams was selected on the interchange bench for New South Wales in Game 1 of the 2014 State of Origin series on the 100th State of Origin match in the Blues 12–8 win at Suncorp Stadium. On 5 October 2014, in the Bulldogs 2014 NRL Grand Final against the South Sydney Rabbitohs, Williams played at second-row and scored a try in the Bulldogs 6–30 loss. Williams finished the 2014 NRL season with him playing in 27 matches and scoring 4 tries for the Bulldogs.

=== 2015 ===
On 23 January 2015, Williams was named in the Bulldogs 2015 Auckland Nines squad. After the Bulldogs 41–34 win against the Canberra Raiders in Round 11, Williams suffered a season ending pectoral muscle injury at training, ruling him out for the rest of the season. Williams finished the 2015 NRL season with him playing in 11 matches for the Bulldogs.

=== 2016 ===
On 1 February 2016, Williams was named in the Bulldogs 2016 Auckland Nines squad. In Round 5 against the Canberra Raiders, Williams played his 150th NRL career match in the Bulldogs 22–8 loss at Belmore Sports Ground. On 7 May 2016, Williams played his first game for Tonga in 8 years. Williams' Mate Ma'a Tonga team took on Samoa in the 2016 Polynesian Cup, where he played in the second row in the 18–6 loss at Parramatta Stadium. In Round 10, he was dropped to the Bulldogs' Intrust Super Premiership NSW team. Williams finished the 2016 NRL season with him playing 19 matches and scored 1 try for the Bulldogs. On 7 November 2016, Williams signed a 1-year deal with the Cronulla-Sutherland Sharks for the 2017 season.

=== 2017 ===
Williams started the 2017 season playing for the Newtown Jets in the Sharks Intrust Super Premiership NSW Cup team before earning his club debut in Round 9 against the Wests Tigers, starting at second-row and scoring a try in the 22–16 win at Leichhardt Oval. On 7 May 2017, Williams played for Tonga against Fiji in the 2017 Pacific Test, starting at second-row but unfortunately suffered a season-ending anterior cruciate ligament (ACL) knee injury during the 26–24 thrilling win at Campbelltown Stadium. Williams finished the 2017 NRL season with him only playing in 1 match and scoring 1 try for Sharks. On 17 November 2017, Williams signed a 1-year deal with his former club the Parramatta Eels for the 2018 season.

=== 2018 ===
On 14 February 2018, Williams was fined $1,000, had his driver's licence suspended for 12 months, and was placed on a 12-month good behaviour bond after appearing in Parramatta local court for mid-range drink driving. Williams had insisted on driving home when his wife came to pick him up after a birthday celebration at the Albion Hotel in Parramatta on 16 December 2016. His three young children were in the car at the time. His driving was so erratic that members of the public called the police, who discovered Williams had a blood alcohol level of 0.122. "Shame on you, Mr Williams," Magistrate Jennifer Giles said at sentencing. She said the "community does not feel safe with you with a licence; you are exceptionally lucky you did not hurt or kill someone, or yourself." Williams also has handed a 2-week suspension by the club. On 29 April 2018, Williams ruptured his ACL in Parramatta's 24–22 victory over The Wests Tigers, subsequent scans revealed that he would miss the remainder of the season.

On 15 September, it was alleged that Williams had tested positive to cocaine during a random drugs test conducted by the Parramatta club. On 25 September, Williams contract with Parramatta was terminated after the player had been found guilty of failing a second drugs test. Williams was also handed a fine and a 12 match suspension by the NRL.

=== 2019 ===
On 2 March, Williams signed a one-year deal to join the Blacktown Workers Sea Eagles. On 10 September, Williams was set to make a shock return to the Manly side for the club's elimination final against his former club Cronulla-Sutherland but the return did not eventuate.

=== 2020 ===
In September 2020, Williams was released by the Manly club without having played a game.

=== 2021 ===
In March 2021, Williams signed a contract to join the Windsor Wolves in the Ron Massey Cup. Just a month later, Williams signed a contract with New York Freedom, to play in the inaugural season of the NARL. In response to former NRL player Jarryd Hayne being sentenced to almost six years' jail for sexual assault, Williams wrote on his social media account: "To all Haynsy's family and friends stay strong for him and let God do he's thing I love you all ... God always prevails. Before I let this be just want to congratulate the victim and the so called justice system you've sent an innocent brotherly to jail away from he's kids you bunch of flops ... that's all respectively."

On 6 May 2021, the New York Freedom then subsequently confirmed, via social media, that they had terminated Williams's contract.

=== 2022 ===
On 20 January, Williams signed a contract to play with Picton in the Country New South Wales competition.
