= Phil Morwood =

Australian rugby league footballer

Personal information
- Full name: Phil Morwood
- Born: 17 June 1982 (age 44) Toowoomba, Queensland, Australia

Playing information
- Position: Prop
Club
Years	Team	Pld	T	G	FG	P
2004–08	Manly Warringah	8	0	0	0	0
- Source: As of 22 January 2019

Phil Morwood (born 17 June 1982) in Toowoomba, Queensland, Australia is a former professional rugby league footballer who played for the Manly Warringah Sea Eagles in the National Rugby League. He played as a prop or in the second-row.
