= Tom Humble =

Australian rugby league footballer

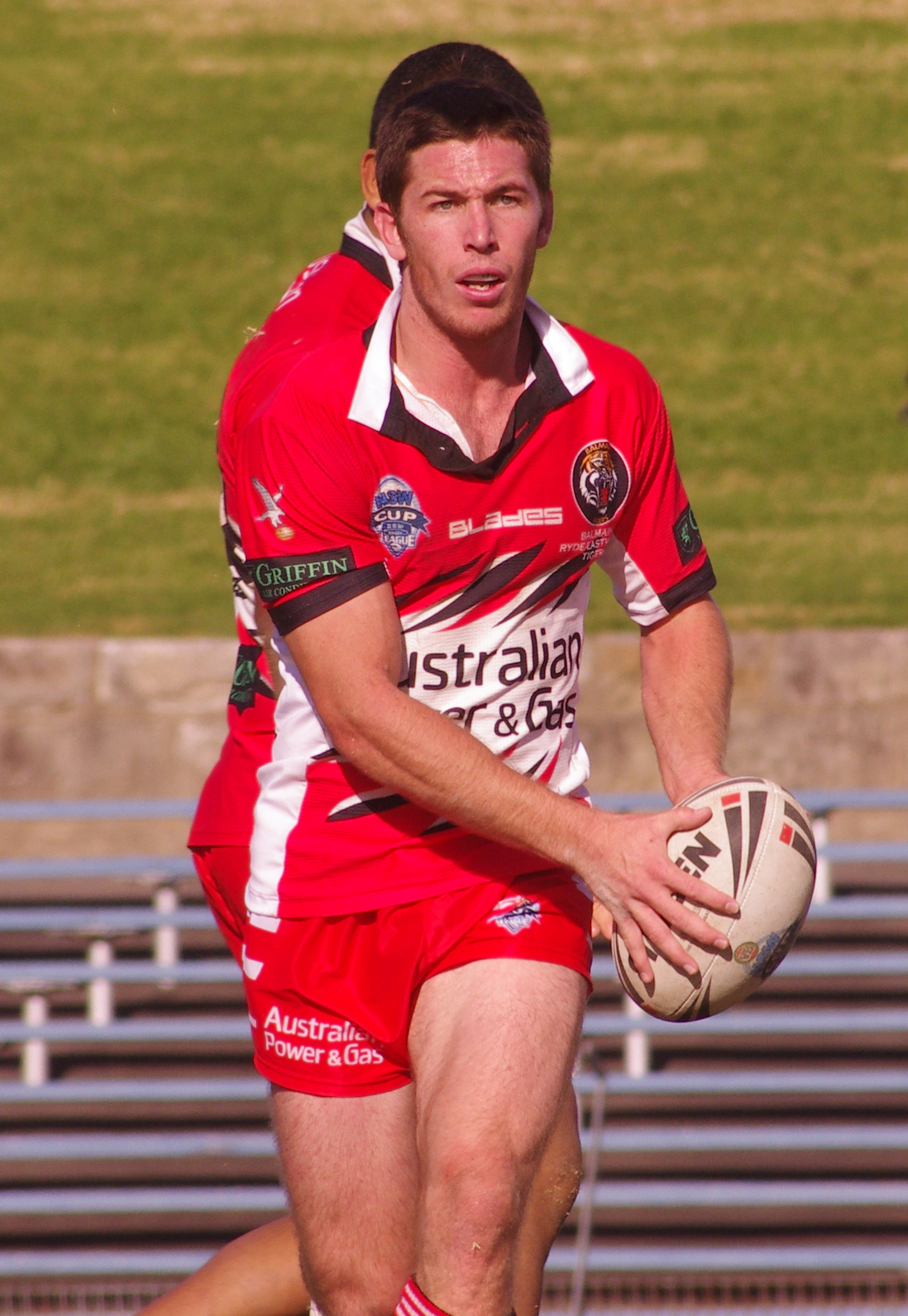

Personal information
- Full name: Tom Humble
- Born: 5 November 1988 (age 38) Brisbane, Queensland, Australia
- Height: 183 cm (6 ft 0 in)
- Weight: 84 kg (13 st 3 lb)

Playing information
- Position: Fullback, Five-eighth, Halfback, Hooker
Club
Years	Team	Pld	T	G	FG	P
2010–11	Parramatta Eels	6	2	0	0	8
2012	Wests Tigers	15	2	0	0	8
2013–14	Penrith Panthers	6	1	0	0	4
	Total	27	5	0	0	20
Representative
Years	Team	Pld	T	G	FG	P
2009	Queensland Residents	1	0	0	0	0
2011	New South Wales Residents	1	0	1	0	2
- Source: As of 5 January 2024

Tom Humble (born 5 November 1988) is an Australian former professional rugby league footballer who last played for the Townsville Blackhawks in the Queensland Cup. He previously played for the Penrith Panthers, Parramatta Eels and the Wests Tigers in the NRL. He was able to cover a number of positions in the backs.

== Playing career ==
A Blackwater Crushers junior, and a student at St. Brendan's College, Yeppoon, Humble played in the North Queensland Cowboys NYC team in 2008, and the club's feeder team, Northern Pride in 2009. Humble said of his time with the Cowboys, "I was 18th man a few times but I never got a start in first grade. I would have liked to but I was still pretty young when I was there and I wasn't ready."

In 2010, Humble joined the Parramatta Eels. He made his NRL debut midway through the season. He made 6 appearances for the year, scoring 2 tries in games where he started at fullback, covering for an injured Jarryd Hayne. After his appearances in top grade, Humble was suspended after testing positive to methylhexaneamine, a banned stimulant, while playing for the Eel's feeder club. It was reported that he had, "unwittingly ingested the substance in a performance supplement that was routinely provided to Wentworthville players before games."

Humble joined the Wests Tigers for the 2012 season, starting the first match from the bench. However, a season-ending injury to James Tedesco saw him taking over as the team's starting fullback. Humble said at the time, "At this stage of my career I need to lock myself into one spot and that is fullback." Only weeks later, Tim Moltzen had been shifted to fullback, and Humble was playing at halfback. In the second half of the season, Humble played a number of games from the bench or playing hooker when Robbie Farah was unavailable. Described as, "the ultimate utility," Humble said, "I'm only 20 games in and wherever (coach) Tim Sheens puts me, I'll do the job to the best of my ability."

Humble finished the season playing for feeder team Balmain Ryde Eastwood Tigers and was a member of the side that lost the NSW Cup grand final.

In November 2012, Humble signed a deal to join the Penrith Panthers for two years. He made six appearances at five-eighth early in the 2013 season, but played no further first grade. Humble signed on with the Townsville Blackhawks in October, 2014 for their inaugural season in the Queensland Cup in 2015. In 2016, Humble joined the Norths Devils in the Townsville Rugby league playing Halfback. He played alongside names such as Wayne Ulugia, Ricky Thorby and Corey Horsburgh.
