= Brandon Costin =

Pro RL coach and former United States international rugby league footballer

Personal information
- Born: 23 June 1972 (age 54) Dubbo, New South Wales, Australia

Playing information
- Position: Centre, Five-eighth, Second-row
Club
Years	Team	Pld	T	G	FG	P
1993	South Sydney	6	4	0	0	16
1994–97	Western Suburbs	60	26	5	0	114
1997	Eastern Suburbs	10	6	3	0	30
1998–00	Canberra Raiders	60	18	6	0	84
2001	Huddersfield	25	15	34	1	129
2002	Bradford Bulls	21	8	0	0	32
2003–04	Huddersfield	44	27	60	2	230
	Total	226	104	108	3	635
Representative
Years	Team	Pld	T	G	FG	P
2004	USA	1	1	1	0	6
2006	Queensland Residents	1	0	1	0	2

Coaching information
Representative
Years	Team	Gms	W	D	L	W%
2010	Queensland Residents	1	0	0	1	0
2019–	Fiji Prime Minister's XIII	3	0	0	3	0
2019	Fiji	3	3	0	0	100

Brandon Costin (born 23 June 1972) is a former professional rugby league footballer who played in the 1990s and 2000s. He initially played under the name Brandon Pearson. He played for the Huddersfield Giants, Canberra Raiders, South Sydney Rabbitohs, the Bradford Bulls and the United States national rugby league team. His position was five-eighth, although he often featured at other positions including centre or lock.

== Playing career ==
A Dubbo junior, Costin made his début for South Sydney Rabbitohs in 1993, before switching to Western Suburbs Magpies for the next season.

Costin spent 4 seasons with the Magpies. In 1994, he made 8 appearances, but managed to score seven tries in the last five games of the year. His try-scoring form continued in the start on the 1995 season, scoring 6 in the first five games. Towards the end of the year he was moved from centre to five-eighth.

In 1996, Costin was a regular in the centres, playing in every game of the season. In the round 12 match against the Gold Coast Seagulls, Costin scored three tries in one match. That year the Magpies played semi-final football, but were knocked out in their first match.

Midway through the 1997 season, Costin made a late change to join Eastern Suburbs. He went on to play in 2 semi-finals with the Roosters that year, but did not play in the Preliminary Final that they lost.

In 1999, Ben Kennedy and Costin were sent home from training after being involved in a drinking session. There were claims that the pair had taken drugs, and Costin confessed to taking an illicit substance, but Kennedy claimed to have spat the tablet out. Subsequent drug tests for both returned negative.

His last game for the Raiders was a 20-16 win at Lock against the Melbourne Storm in Round 25 of 2000.

As Super League VI champions, the Bradford Bulls played against 2001 NRL Premiers, the Newcastle Knights in the 2002 World Club Challenge. Costin was selected for the interchange bench in Bradford's victory. Costin played for the Bradford Bulls at centre in their 2002 Super League Grand Final loss against St. Helens. In the 2003 Super League season, Costin was a nominee for the Man of Steel Award and was the 4th highest try scorer, despite missing the last 5 games through injury. He left the club at the end of the 2004 season and went into semi-retirement.

After his retirement from professional football, Costin played and coached with Souths Logan in Brisbane.

== Coaching career ==
In 2007 Costin assumed the head coaching role of the Souths Logan Magpies in the Qld Cup before taking charge of the Sunshine Coast Sea Eagles (now Falcons) in 2009, guiding them to a premiership in their inaugural season. In 2010, Costin was coach of the Queensland Residents side. In 2018 he coached the Coffs Harbour Comets in the Group 2 Rugby League. An injury crisis at the club saw Costin playing in the semis that year at 46 years old.

Costin took over as coach of Fiji in 2019. His first match in charge was a 58–14 win over Lebanon.

== Sources ==
- Alan Whiticker & Glen Hudson (2007). The Encyclopedia of Rugby League Players. Wetherill Park, New South Wales: Gary Allen Pty Ltd. ISBN 978-1-877082-93-1.

Sporting positions
Preceded by Matt Adamson; 2018	Head Coach Fiji; 2019	Succeeded by Joe Dakuitoga; 2020-present
