= 2003 North Queensland Cowboys season =

Coordinates: 19°18′58″S 146°42′43″E

- NRL Rank: 11th
- Play-off result: Missed finals
- 2003 record: Wins: 10; draws: 0; losses: 14
- Points scored: For: 606; against: 629

Team information
- CEO: Denis Keeffe
- Coach: Graham Murray
- Captain: Paul Bowman
- Stadium: Dairy Farmers Stadium
- Avg. attendance: 14,892
- High attendance: 25,242 (vs. Brisbane Broncos, Round 4)

Top scorers
- Tries: Matt Sing (21)
- Goals: Josh Hannay (95)
- Points: Josh Hannay (230)
← 2002	2004 →

The 2003 North Queensland Cowboys season was the 9th in the club's history. Coached by Graham Murray and captained by Paul Bowman, they competed in the NRL's 2003 Telstra Premiership. Although the club once again finished 11th, they recorded their highest number of wins (10) and competition points (24) in a season.

== Season summary ==
The rebuild continued for the Cowboys heading into the 2003 season, with 12 players leaving the club. Their key signings included premiership-winning back rower Kevin Campion, New Zealand international prop Paul Rauhihi and journeyman utility David Myles. All three would eventually help the club to their first finals appearance a year later.

Following a solid end to the 2002 season, the new year started brightly for the club, as they won six games from the first 12 rounds to sit inside the Top 8. They picked up three straights win from Rounds 10-12, their first three-game winning streak since 1998. A mid-season slump would soon follow, with eight losses from their next nine fixtures.

The season ended strongly once again, with three wins from their final four games to secure a second consecutive 11th place finish, four competition points outside the Top 8. During the season Matt Sing became the first Cowboy to represent Australia, when selected for their July Test match against New Zealand.

=== Milestones ===
- Round 1: Kevin Campion, Paul McNicholas, David Myles and Paul Rauhihi made their debuts for the club.
- Round 2: Brenton Bowen made his NRL debut.
- Round 6: Neil Sweeney made his debut for the club.
- Round 13: Jason Barsley made his NRL debut.
- Round 13: John Buttigieg played his 100th game for the club.
- Round 14: Matthew Bowen played his 50th game for the club.
- Round 15: Aaron Morgan made his NRL debut.
- Round 18: Daniel Sorbello made his NRL debut.
- Round 19: Micheal Luck played his 50th game for the club.
- Round 22: Jacob Lillyman made his NRL debut.
- Round 22: Daniel Strickland played his 50th game for the club.
- Round 23: Shane Muspratt played his 50th game for the club.

== Squad List ==
North Queensland Cowboys NRL Squad 2003
First team squad				Coaching staff
Jason Barsley – CE; Brenton Bowen – WG; Matthew Bowen – FB; Paul Bowman (c) – CE; John Buttigieg – PR; Dane Campbell – HB; Kevin Campion – LK; Paul Dezolt – HK; Nathan Fien – HB; George Gatis – HK; Steven Goodhew – HK	Josh Hannay – CE; Ben Laity – PR; Jacob Lillyman – SR; Dean Limpus – PR; Jaiman Lowe – PR; Micheal Luck – SR; Jamie McDonald – PR; Paul McNicholas – PR; Leigh McWilliams – HK; Michael Meigan – CE; Aaron Morgan – WG	Glenn Morrison – LK; Chris Muckert – SR; Shane Muspratt – HK; David Myles – FE; Aaron Payne – HK; Simon Phillips – WG; Paul Rauhihi – PR; Grant Reibel – PR; Matthew Scott – PR; Chris Sheppard – FE; Matt Sing – WG	Daniel Sorbello – FB; Daniel Strickland – SR; Neil Sweeney – WG; David Thompson – PR; Derrick Watkins – LK; Scott Whiting – CE; Ty Williams – WG	Head coach: Graham Murray; Assistant coach: Neil Henry (assistant coach); Legend: (c) Captain(s); (vc) Vice-captain(s)

== Squad Movement ==
=== 2003 Gains ===
Player	Signed from
Jason Barsley	Central Comets
Dane Campbell	Redcliffe Dolphins
Kevin Campion	Warriors
Luke Cross	Queensland Reds
Paul McNicholas	South Sydney Rabbitohs
Michael Meigan	Canterbury Bulldogs
Aaron Morgan	Wests Panthers
David Myles	Warriors
Paul Rauhihi	Canterbury Bulldogs
Neil Sweeney	Newcastle Knights

=== 2003 Losses ===
Player	Signed from
Ashley Alberts	Brisbane Broncos
Tevita Amone	Released
Tarin Bradford	Retired
Tim Brasher	Retired
John Doyle	Central Comets
Peter Jones	Retired
Tim Maddison	Pia Donkeys
John Manning	Melbourne Storm
Ken McGuinness	Retired
Justin McKay	Wests Tigers
Grant Rovelli	Sydney Roosters
Shaun Valentine	Retired

== Ladder ==
2003 NRL season
Pos	Team	Pld	W	D	L	B	PF	PA	PD	Pts
1	Penrith Panthers (P)	24	18	0	6	2	659	527	+132	40
2	Sydney Roosters	24	17	0	7	2	680	445	+235	38
3	Canterbury-Bankstown Bulldogs	24	16	0	8	2	702	419	+283	36
4	Canberra Raiders	24	16	0	8	2	620	463	+157	36
5	Melbourne Storm	24	15	0	9	2	564	486	+78	34
6	New Zealand Warriors	24	15	0	9	2	545	510	+35	34
7	Newcastle Knights	24	14	0	10	2	632	635	-3	32
8	Brisbane Broncos	24	12	0	12	2	497	464	+33	28
9	Parramatta Eels	24	11	0	13	2	570	582	-12	26
10	St George Illawarra Dragons	24	11	0	13	2	548	593	-45	26
11	North Queensland Cowboys	24	10	0	14	2	606	629	-23	24
12	Cronulla-Sutherland Sharks	24	8	0	16	2	497	704	-207	20
13	Wests Tigers	24	7	0	17	2	470	598	-128	18
14	Manly-Warringah Sea Eagles	24	7	0	17	2	557	791	-234	18
15	South Sydney Rabbitohs	24	3	0	21	2	457	758	-301	10

== Fixtures ==
=== Regular season ===
Date	Round	Opponent	Venue	Score	Tries	Goals	Attendance
15 March	Round 1	Canberra Raiders	Dairy Farmers Stadium	14 – 46	Sing (2), Hannay	Hannay (1/3)	15,421
22 March	Round 2	Manly Sea Eagles	Dairy Farmers Stadium	30 – 20	Lowe (2), McNicholas, Sing	Hannay (7/8)	10,937
31 March	Round 3	South Sydney Rabbitohs	Aussie Stadium	27 – 20	B. Bowen, Muckert, Sheppard	Hannay (7/8), Sheppard (1 FG)	9,422
5 April	Round 4	Brisbane Broncos	Dairy Farmers Stadium	24 – 32	B. Bowen, Morrison, Myles, McWilliams	Hannay (4/4), B. Bowen (0/1)	25,242
12 April	Round 5	Sydney Roosters	Dairy Farmers Stadium	0 – 32			12,089
21 April	Round 6	Warriors	Ericsson Stadium	24 – 30	Sing (2), Hannay, McWilliams	Hannay (4/4)	19,722
26 April	Round 7	Melbourne Storm	Dairy Farmers Stadium	32 – 12	Sing (3), Hannay, Williams	Hannay (6/6)	12,023
	Round 8	Bye					
11 May	Round 9	Brisbane Broncos	ANZ Stadium	12 – 38	M. Bowen, Myles	Hannay (2/2)	13,197
17 May	Round 10	Wests Tigers	Dairy Farmers Stadium	26 – 8	Sing (2), Luck, Muspratt	Hannay (5/6)	10,783
24 May	Round 11	Manly Sea Eagles	Brookvale Oval	31 – 20	Sing (2), Hannay, Morrison, Myles	Hannay (5/6), Morrison (0/1), Sheppard (1 FG)	7,028
1 June	Round 12	St George Illawarra Dragons	Oki Jubilee Stadium	36 – 16	Sing (2), Bowman, Morrison, Sheppard, Williams	Hannay (6/7)	13,517
7 June	Round 13	Penrith Panthers	Dairy Farmers Stadium	24 – 28	Barsley, Hannay, Myles, Williams	Hannay (4/5)	17,012
15 June	Round 14	Sydney Roosters	Aussie Stadium	14 – 15	Morrison, Myles	Hannay (3/4)	9,123
21 June	Round 15	Parramatta Eels	Parramatta Stadium	22 – 24	Morgan, Morrison, Myles, Sweeney	Hannay (3/5)	9,027
28 June	Round 16	Cronulla Sharks	Dairy Farmers Stadium	28 – 34	Williams (2), M. Bowen, Morrison	Hannay (6/7)	13,598
5 July	Round 17	Warriors	Dairy Farmers Stadium	30 – 10	Hannay, Morrison, Sing, Williams	Hannay (7/9)	16,028
12 July	Round 18	Melbourne Storm	Olympic Park	16 – 22	Dezolt, Morgan, Myles	Morrison (2/4)	7,643
19 July	Round 19	St George Illawarra Dragons	Dairy Farmers Stadium	16 – 38	M. Bowen, Bowman, Sing	Morrison (2/3), Hannay (0/1)	16,542
27 July	Round 20	Canterbury Bulldogs	Sydney Showground	22 – 42	Hannay, Myles, McDonald, Sing	Hannay (3/5)	7,091
	Round 21	Bye					
9 August	Round 22	Newcastle Knights	Dairy Farmers Stadium	24 – 60	M. Bowen, Muckert, Rauhihi, Williams	Hannay (4/4)	15,072
16 August	Round 23	Canberra Raiders	Canberra Stadium	34 – 28	B. Bowen, Bowman, Hannay, Myles, Payne, Williams	Hannay (5/7)	8,074
23 August	Round 24	South Sydney Rabbitohs	Dairy Farmers Stadium	60 – 8	M. Bowen (3), Hannay, Muckert, Myles, Payne, Rauhihi, Sing, Williams	Hannay (10/12)	13,872
31 August	Round 25	Wests Tigers	Campbelltown Stadium	34 – 14	Williams (3), Sing (2), Hannay, Muckert	Hannay (3/6), M. Bowen (0/1)	6,158
7 September	Round 26	Newcastle Knights	EnergyAustralia Stadium	26 – 34	M. Bowen, Myles, Sing	M. Bowen (5/7)	18,244
Legend: Win Loss Draw Bye

== Statistics ==
Name	App	T	G	FG	Pts
Jason Barsley	3	1	-	-	4
Brenton Bowen	6	3	-	-	12
Matthew Bowen	20	9	5	-	46
Paul Bowman	16	3	-	-	12
John Buttigieg	8	-	-	-	-
Kevin Campion	24	-	-	-	-
Paul Dezolt	9	1	-	-	4
Nathan Fien	2	-	-	-	-
George Gatis	1	-	-	-	-
Josh Hannay	23	10	95	-	230
Jacob Lillyman	3	-	-	-	-
Jaiman Lowe	24	2	-	-	8
Micheal Luck	22	1	-	-	4
Jamie McDonald	11	1	-	-	4
Paul McNicholas	7	1	-	-	4
Leigh McWilliams	14	2	-	-	8
Aaron Morgan	2	2	-	-	8
Glenn Morrison	22	7	4	-	36
Chris Muckert	23	4	-	-	16
Shane Muspratt	21	1	-	-	4
David Myles	24	11	-	-	44
Aaron Payne	4	2	-	-	8
Chris Sheppard	22	2	-	2	10
Matt Sing	20	21	-	-	84
Daniel Sorbello	1	-	-	-	-
Daniel Strickland	17	-	-	-	-
Neil Sweeney	7	1	-	-	4
David Thompson	6	-	-	-	-
Derrick Watkins	1	-	-	-	-
Scott Whiting	2	-	-	-	-
Ty Williams	22	12	-	-	48
Totals		99	104	2	606

== Representatives ==
The following players played a representative match in 2003.

	City vs Country	State of Origin 1	State of Origin 2	State of Origin 3	July Test	October Test	Ashes Series
Matthew Bowen	-	-	Queensland	Queensland	-	-	-
Paul Bowman	-	Queensland	-	-	-	-	-
Josh Hannay	-	-	-	Queensland	-	-	-
Glenn Morrison	Country	-	-	-	-	-	-
Paul Rauhihi	-	-	-	-	New Zealand	-	-
Matt Sing	-	Queensland	Queensland	Queensland	Australia	Australia	Australia

== Honours ==
=== Club ===
- Player of the Year: Paul Rauhihi
- Players' Player: Matt Sing
- Club Person of the Year: Ty Williams

== Feeder Clubs ==
=== Queensland Cup ===
- North Queensland Young Guns - 7th, missed finals
