= 2008 Northern Pride RLFC season =

Coordinates: 16°55′49″S 145°46′2″E

Northern Pride
Club information
- Full name: Northern Pride Rugby League Football Club
- Nickname: The Pride
- Colours: Teal, Gold
- Founded: 2007
- Website: northernpride.com.au

Current details
- Ground: Barlow Park, Cairns (seating 1,700, standing 15,000)
- CEO: Denis Keeffe (2007–2009)
- Coach: Andrew Dunemann (2008–2009)
- Captain: Chris Sheppard (2008–2010)
- Competition: Wizard Queensland Cup
- 2008: 3rd
Home colours

Away colours

Records
- Premierships: 2 (2010, 2014)
- Runners-up: 1 (2009)
- Minor premierships: 3 (2013, 2014, 2024)

2008 was the first competitive season for the Cairns based CRGT Northern Pride Rugby League Football Club. They were one of 11 clubs that played in the thirteenth season of the top rugby league competition in Queensland, Australia, competing for the, QRL's Wizard Queensland Cup.

The Northern Pride and Mackay Cutters were two new teams that entered the competition in 2008. Mackay hadn't hosted a team since the Mackay Sea Eagles played the 1996 season, while Cairns was represented by the Cairns Cyclones from 1996 to 2000. The two new clubs replaced the Aspley Broncos and North Queensland Young Guns, who withdrew from the competition. With the loss of the Young Guns, the North Queensland Cowboys formed new feeder club partnerships with the Cutters and Pride.

The original coach was Adrian Lam, who had been captain of the PNG Kumuls, had represented Queensland at State of Origin, and played halfback for the Sydney Roosters and Wigan Warriors. Lam arrived in Cairns in August 2007 while the Pride's bid to enter the QCup competition was being prepared, but was released a month later to take up a coaching position at the Sydney Roosters. He was replaced by Northern Pride's foundation coach, Andrew Dunemann, who had played five-eighth and hooker for the Gold Coast Seagulls, North Queensland Cowboys, South Sydney Rabbitohs and the Canberra Raiders in the NRL, and the Halifax Blue Sox, Leeds Rhinos and Salford City Reds in the English Super League. He had also coached the Canberra Raiders Under-20s team, and turned down an assistant coaching position at Halifax RLFC to coach in Cairns.

The two assistant coaches were David Maiden and Troy Cummings. Maiden was a rugby league international who represented Scotland in the 2000 World Cup, was a foundation player for the North Queensland Cowboys in the NRL, and played lock and centre for Gateshead Thunder and Hull F.C. in the English Super League, and the Cairns Cyclones in the Queensland Cup, and was currently the Junior Development Officer for the North Queensland Cowboys and General Manager of the CDRL. Cummings played lock for CDRL Mareeba Gladiators, and played for and coached the Cairns Marlins in the Foley Shield.

Foundation captain was Chris Sheppard, who had played halfback for the North Queensland Cowboys and St. George Illawarra Dragons. Fullback Chey Bird was appointed captain in Rounds 13 and 14, and in the finals series when 'Shep' was injured or unavailable, and prop Ben Laity was captain for Round 15. Lock Warren Jensen was captain for the first pre-season trial at Yarrabah.

'Shep' was the first player signed to the Pride, followed by local players Hezron Murgha and Noel Underwood from CDRL Yarrabah Seahawks, Kahu Wehi and Ritchie Marsters from Tully Tigers, Alex Starmer from Ivanhoes Knights, and Jason Roos from Mareeba Gladiators. The Chief Executive Officer and Commercial Manager visited Port Moresby to sign PNG players, but the Pride were unable to get work visas for the pair to enter Australia.

The Northern Pride played ten home games and ten away games over 22 rounds between March and August, and three games in the finals series. Their inaugural match was a home game, played at Barlow Park, Cairns, when the Pride scored eight tries, beating newcomers Mackay Cutters 44–16. Eleven North Queensland Cowboys played this match (three for the Pride and eight for the Cutters). The match itself was something of a debacle, as the pitch was a rain-drenched mud-pit and coach Dunemann wanted the game called off. Pride officials turned spectators, match officials, caterers and security officers away, claiming the match was cancelled, but QRL insisted the game proceed.

The Pride won their first seven games, before their first defeat in Round 8, when they lost 34–4 to Tweed Heads Seagulls. Injuries dogged the team in the middle of the season, and Rugby League Week magazine predicted the newcomers would finish towards the bottom of the table. The Pride lost the last three matches of the regular season, but still finished in third place, having won 13 of their 20 games. They reached the Preliminary Final, but lost in golden point extra-time to the Souths Logan Magpies, who went on to win the Grand Final.

Six of the Pride's away games were televised on ABC 1. There were calls for the ABC to expand their outside broadcasting abilities and televise a Pride home game next season.

The Pride's office was at Mann Street in Westcourt and the team trained at Jones Park. In June 2008 the Pride purchased CDRL Kangaroos Leagues Club and Vico Oval, Irene Street, Mooroobool from the Redcliffe Dolphins in June 2008 for $1.85m (the Dolphins having purchased the Oval and Leagues Club from the Kangaroos in 2005 when Kangaroos were in financial difficulty). The playing field was renamed as Pride Oval, and the end of season Player Awards ceremony was held at the rebranded Pride Leagues Club. The facility was to be used as an administration and training base, there were plans for a multi-million dollar development and for the Pride junior teams to play there. Six weeks later, however, the project was put on hold as the Pride faced financial uncertainty after chairman O'Brien's Pacific Toyota dealership went into receivership with debts around $25 million. O'Brien was a majority owner of the NBL Cairns Taipans, and had withdrawn financial support from the basketball team, placing them into voluntary administration. The QRL delayed the release of next seasons draw pending a review of the Pride's financial situation. O'Brien stood aside as the Northern Pride's chairman, and was replaced by Bob Fowler, former chairman of the Queensland Cup side the Cairns Cyclones.

== 2008 Season – CRGT Northern Pride ==
- Competition: Wizard Queensland Cup
- Sponsor: Cairns Region Group Training (CRGT), three-year naming rights sponsorship.

=== Staff ===
==== Coaches/Trainers ====
- Coach: Andrew Dunemann
- Assistant coach: David Maiden
- Academy coach: Troy Cummings
- Strength and conditioning coach: Scott Callaghan

==== Captain ====
- Chris Sheppard
- Chey Bird (Rounds 13 & 14, Finals Week 2, Preliminary Final)
- Ben Laity (Round 15)
- Warren Jensen (Yarrabah pre-season trail match)

==== Managers ====
- Operations manager: Chris Sheppard
- Commercial manager: Brad Tassell
- Team manager: Rob White
- Office Manager: Sheron McDougall
- Chief executive: Denis Keeffe
- Chairman: John O'Brien
- Board of Directors: Greg Dowling, Nigel Tillett, Craig Meiklejohn, Bob Fowler, John O'Brien.

== 2008 squad ==
The Pride used 35 players this season, all of whom were new signings to the club. Seven of these were Cowboys allocation players.

Chris Sheppard (c)
Brett Anderson
Adam Mills
Alex Starmer
Ben Kerr
Ben Laity
Callan Myles
Chey Bird
Chris Afamasaga
Drew Campbell
Eric Warria
Gordon Rattler
Greg Byrnes
Hezron Murgha

Jamie Frizzo
Jason Roos
Joel Riethmuller
Josh Vaughan
Luke Harlen
Luke Millwood
Mark Cantoni
Noel Underwood
Quincy To'oto'o-ulugia Richie Marsters
Rod Griffin
Steve Sheppard
Warren Jensen

Trial

Farren Wilett
Jordan Kane
Joshua Wehi
Kahu Wehi
Ryan Bartlett
Shaun Cribb
Steve McLean

North Queensland Cowboys allocation

Ben Vaeau*
Jackson Nicolau*
John Williams*
Matthew Bartlett*
Scott Bolton*
Steve Southern*
Ty Williams*

Allocated but did not play for the Pride in 2008:
Aaron Payne
Ashley Graham
Carl Webb
Jacob Lillyman
Justin Smith
Mark Henry
Matt Bowen
Ray Cashmere

=== Player gains ===
This was the first season for the Pride, so all players were new signings.

Player	From League	From Club	Notes
Ryan Bartlett	Wizard Queensland Cup	North Queensland Young Guns	
Greg Byrnes	Wizard Queensland Cup	North Queensland Young Guns	
Brett Anderson	Wizard Queensland Cup	North Queensland Young Guns	
Warren Jensen	Wizard Queensland Cup	Wynnum Manly Seagulls	
Josh Vaughan	Wizard Queensland Cup	Tweed Heads Seagulls	
Joel Riethmuller	Wizard Queensland Cup	Ipswich Jets	
Gordon Rattler	Wizard Queensland Cup	Ipswich Jets	
Mark Cantoni	Wizard Queensland Cup	Eastern Suburbs Tigers	
Ben Laity	Wizard Queensland Cup	Eastern Suburbs Tigers	
Quincy To'oto'o-ulugia	NRL Telstra Premiership	Cronulla Sharks Jersey Flegg	
Hezron Murgha	CDRL	Yarrabah Seahawks	
Noel Underwood	CDRL	Yarrabah Seahawks	
Farran Willett	CDRL	Yarrabah Seahawks	
Kahu Wehi	CDRL	Tully Tigers	
Ritchie Marsters	CDRL	Tully Tigers	
Joshua Wehi	CDRL	Tully Tigers	
Alex Starmer	CDRL	Ivanhoes Knights	
Drew Campbell	CDRL	Ivanhoes Knights	
Jason Roos	CDRL	Mareeba Gladiators	
Chris Sheppard	CDRL	Mareeba Gladiators	
Steve Sheppard	CDRL	Mareeba Gladiators	
Adam Mills	CDRL	Atherton Roosters	
Chey Bird	TDRL	Brothers Townsville	
Ben Kerr	CDRL	Innisfail Leprechauns	
Steve McLean	Junior	Canberra Raiders juniors	
Eric Warria	Junior	Northern Territory team	Australian Secondary Schools Rugby League
Chris Afamasaga	NRL Telstra Premiership	Gold Coast Titans	Signed in Round 10. Afamasaga walked out of the club after Round 18.
Jamie Frizzo	NRL Telstra Premiership	North Queensland Cowboys	Signed in Round 10
Rod Griffin	NRL Telstra Premiership	Wests Tigers	Signed in Round 12
Luke Harlen	NRL Telstra Premiership	Wests Tigers	Signed in Round 16
Callan Myles	CDRL	Ivanhoes Knights	Played in the Finals series

=== PNG signings ===
At the start of the season attempts were made to sign players from the PNG rugby league, but problems with visas prevented them coming to Australia.

Player	From League	From Club
(Papua New Guinea) Michael Mark, (wing)	SP Inter-City Cup	Mendi Muruks
(Papua New Guinea) Jesse Joe Parker Nandye, (five-eighth)	SP Inter-City Cup	Pagini Simbu Warriors

=== 2008 season launch ===
- Pre-Season Training: 5 November 2007.
- Team Launch: 14 December 2007.
- Pre-season boot camp: Croco Dylus Village Camp, Daintree River, 19–20 January 2008.
- Season Launch: 7 March 2008 at 11.00am, Stockland Cairns shopping centre, Earlville. (Originally scheduled as part of the Esplanade Lagoon's fifth-year celebrations but moved to Stockland Cairns due to Wet season flooding in Cairns).

=== 2008 player awards ===
26 September 2008, Pride Leagues Club, Irene Street, Mooroobool.

- Yalumba Wines Most Improved Player: Hezron Murgha
- EK Kitchens Best Back: Chey Bird
- Skytrans Airlines Best Forward: Mark Cantoni
- CRGT Player of the Year: Chris Sheppard
- John O'Brien Perpetual Club Person of the Year: Rob White (Pride Manager)

==== 2008 representative players ====
(Papua New Guinea) Rod Griffin 3 appearances at the 2008 Rugby League World Cup against England, New Zealand and Australia.

==== 2008 Queensland Residents team ====
Scott Bolton

==== Players signed to first-tier teams ====
Player	To League	To Club
Brett Anderson	NRL Telstra Premiership	Melbourne Storm
Jackson Nicolau*	NRL Telstra Premiership	Gold Coast Titans

=== 2008 jerseys ===
2008 home

2008 away

=== Trial matches ===
Pre-season Trial 1
Saturday
2 February 2008.
17:10 AEST (UTC+10)

Northern Pride	50 – 22	Cairns Select Squad
Tries: Drew Campbell 2 Chey Bird 2 Jason Roos 1 Noel Underwood 1 Adam Mills 1 Richie Marsters 1 Gordon Rattler 1 Goals: Steve Shepard 5 Chey Bird 2	Half-time: 26 – 4	Tries: 1 David Sands; 1 Clifton Tildora; 1 Fenton Murgha; 1 Tyson Brooks Goals: 3 Adam Kelly

Jilara Oval
(Yarrabah, QLD)

CRGT Northern Pride: 1. Chey Bird – FB 2. Drew Campbell – WG 3. Hezron Murgha – CE 4. Noel Underwood – CE 5. Gordon Rattler – WG 6. Farren Wilett – FE 7. Steve Sheppard – HB 8. Greg Byrnes – PR 9. Jason Roos – HK 10. Kahu Wehi – PR 11. Adam Mills – SR 12. Alex Starmer – SR 13. Warren Jensen (c) – LK
Interchange: 14. Richie Marsters, 15. Ben Kerr, 16. Eric Warria, 17. Jordan Kane, 18. Ryan Ghetti.
* = Cowboys allocation.
Cairns Select Squad: ?
- Note: This match was originally scheduled to be played at Callendar Park, Innisfail, but was changed Jilara Oval, the home ground of the CDRL Yarrabah Seahawks.

Pre-season Trial 2
Saturday
16 February 2008
16:00 AEST (UTC+10)

Mackay Cutters	CANCELLED	Northern Pride

Darryl Bourke Oval
(Moranbah, QLD)

CRGT Northern Pride: Coach Andrew Dunemann selected four separate teams to play this match, with each team to play one quarter.
Unavailable: Josh Vaughan was called up by North Queensland Cowboys assistant coach, Ian Millward to play (centre) in their NRL pre-season trial match against the Broncos in Rockhampton.
- Note: This match was cancelled due to wet conditions.

Pre-season Trial 2b
Saturday
16 February 2008
16:00 AEST (UTC+10)

Northern Pride	26 – 20	NYC NQ Cowboys U-20s
Tries: Hezron Murgha 2 Chey Bird 1 Ben Laity 1 Eric Warria 1 Drew Campbell 1 Goals: Stephen Sheppard 1		Tries: 1 Brady Payne; 2 Ricky Griffiths; 1 Brandon Boor Goals: 2 Chris Riesen

Mann Street Field
(Westcourt, Cairns, QLD)

CRGT Northern Pride: ?
Unavailable: Josh Vaughan (called up to play for the Cowboys in their trial against the Broncos.
NYC U-20s Cowboys: ?
- Note: When the original trial match against the Mackay Cutters at Darryl Bourke Oval, Moranbah was cancelled due to wet conditions, Pride coach Andrew Dunemann decided to play an intra-club trial match in Cairns instead. However Pride sponsor Skytrans offered to fly the NYC North Queensland Cowboys U-20s squad to Cairns.
  Entry to the game was $5.
  Noel Underwood was placed on report for a dangerous tackle.
  Ryan Bartlett ended his season with an ACL tear.

Pre-season Trial 3
Saturday
23 February 2008
17:30 AEST (UTC+10)

Northern Pride	22 – 16	NQ Cowboys Select Squad
Tries: Greg Byrnes 1 Chey Bird 1 Mark Cantoni 1 Gordon Rattler 1 Goals: Chey Bird 3		Tries: 2 John Williams*; 1 R Thompson Goals: 2 John Williams* 2

Barlow Park
(Severin Street, Parramatta Park, QLD)

CRGT Northern Pride: 1. Chey Bird – FB 2. Gordon Rattler – WG 3. Brett Anderson – CE 4. Josh Vaughan – CE 5. Hezron Murgha – WG 6. Stephen Sheppard – FE 7. Chris Sheppard (c) – HB 8. Ben Laity – PR 9. Quincy To'oto'o-ulugia – HK 10. Greg Byrnes – PR 11. Alex Starmer – SR 12. Joel Riethmuller – SR 13. Mark Cantoni – LK
Unlimited Interchange: 14. Warren Jensen, 15. Ritchie Marsters, 16. Jason Roos, 17. Noel Underwood, 18. Drew Campbell, 19. Adam Mills.
Unavailable: Ryan Bartlett (ACL).
NQ Cowboys Select Squad: ?

Pre-season Trial 4
Saturday
1 March 2008
19:00 AEST (UTC+10)

Northern Pride	12 – 26	Ipswich Jets
Tries: Mark Cantoni 2 Goals: Chris Sheppard 1 To'oto'o-ulugia 1	Half-time: 6 – 14; Sin bin: Stephen Sheppard	Tries: 1 Malone; 1 Walker; 1 Ryan; 1 Gray; 1 Afamasaka; Goals: 2 Ireland; 1 Malone

Mossman Showgrounds
(Mossman, QLD)

CRGT Northern Pride: 1. Josh Vaughan – FB 2. Drew Campbell – WG 3. Brett Anderson – CE 4. Hezron Murgha – CE 5. Noel Underwood – WG 6. Steve Sheppard – FE 7. Chris Sheppard (c) – HB 8. Ben Laity – PR 9. Quincy To'oto'o-ulugia – HK 10. Alex Starmer – PR 11. Joel Riethmuller – SR 12. Warren Jensen – SR 13. Mark Cantoni – LK
Unlimited Interchange: 14. Ritchie Marsters, 15. Gordon Rattler, 16. Ben Kerr, 17. Adam Mills, 18. Shaun Cribb.
Unavailable: Ryan Bartlett (ACL).
Ipswich Jets: ?
- Note: CDRL Port Douglas/Mossman Sharks RLFC hosted the match. Admission was $6.

=== Wizard Queensland Cup matches ===
ROUND 1: Wizard Queensland Cup 2008

Saturday
15 March 2008
18:00 AEST (UTC+10)

Northern Pride	44 – 16	Mackay Cutters
Tries: Brett Anderson 4 Chey Bird 1 Stephen Sheppard 1 Warren Jensen 1 Greg Byrnes 1 Goals: Chey Bird 6	On report: Chris Sheppard ----- Cairns Post Report; Cairns Post Report	Tries: 1 Anthony Watts; 1 Kerrod Toby; 1 Sam Faust Goals: 1 Chris Giumelli; 1Daniel Abraham

Barlow Park
(Severin Street, Parramatta Park, QLD)
Referee: Justin Davis.
Touch judges: Darryl Bell, Josh Kersevani.
Interchange Official: Daniel Caamano.

CRGT Northern Pride: 1. Chey Bird – FB 2. Gordon Rattler – WG 3. Brett Anderson – CE 4. Jackson Nicolau* – CE 5. Josh Vaughan – WG 6. Stephen Sheppard – FE 7. Chris Sheppard (c) – HB 8. Ben Laity – PR 9. Jason Roos – HK 10. Ben Vaeau* – PR 11. Matthew Bartlett* – SR 12. Joel Riethmuller – SR 13. Mark Cantoni – LK
Interchange: 14. Warren Jensen, 15. Noel Underwood, 16. Alex Starmer, 17. Greg Byrnes.
* = Cowboys allocation (3 players allocated for this match).
Unavailable: Ryan Bartlett (ACL).
Skills Training Mackay Cutters: 2. Chris Giumelli, 4. Anthony Perkins*, Sam Granville, Anthony Watts*, Daniel Backo*, Sione Faumuina*, Sam Faust*, 13. Adam Schubert (c), 12. Dayne Weston*, 11. Keiron Lander*, 10. John Frith*, Daniel Abraham, Jamie McDonald.
Interchange: Aaron Barba, Kerrod Toby, Matt Mannion, Jim Bryant.
* = Cowboys allocation (8 players allocated for this match).
Coach: Shane Muspratt.
- Note: Three North Queensland Cowboys played in the first Northern Pride match – Ben Vaeau* (prop), Jackson Nicolau* (centre) and Matthew Bartlett* (second-row), while the Cutters fielded eight Cowboys
  The match was played on a rain-drenched Barlow Park field in Cairns which coach Andrew Dunemann described as a "mud pit". Pride officials tried to have the game called off due to the conditions but the QRL insisted the game proceed.
  Pride captain Chris Sheppard was placed on report for a high tackle.
  This was the Pride debut for Chris Sheppard (Pride Player 001), Chey Bird, Gordon Rattler, Brett Anderson, Josh Vaughan, Stephen Sheppard, Ben Laity, Jason Roos, Joel Riethmuller, Mark Cantoni, Warren Jensen, Noel Underwood and Alex Starmer, and North Queensland Cowboys allocation players Jackson Nicolau*, Ben Vaeau*, Matthew Bartlett*, and Greg Byrnes (Pride players 002–017).

Position	Round 1 – 2008	P	W	D	L	B	For	Against	Diff	Pts
1	Northern Pride	1	1	0	0	0	44	16	+28	2

ROUND 2: Wizard Queensland Cup 2008

Sunday
23 March 2008
14:00 AEST (UTC+10)

Redcliffe Dolphins	18 – 32	Northern Pride
Tries: Liam Georgetown 1 Mitchell Rivett 1 Craig Priestley 1 Ryan Cullen 1 Goals: Liam Georgetown 1	Half-time: 12 – 16; Cairns Post Report	Tries: 1 Gordon Rattler; 1 Mark Cantoni; 1 Matthew Bartlett*; 1 Warren Jensen; 1 Josh Vaughan; 1 Ty Williams*; Goals: 4 Chey Bird

Dolphin Oval
(Klingner Road, Redcliffe, QLD)
Referee: Robert Gallacher.
Touch judges: Clayton Sharpe, Peter Jones.
Interchange Official: Chris Butler.

CRGT Northern Pride: 1. Chey Bird – FB 2. Gordon Rattler – WG 3. Brett Anderson – CE 18. Ty Williams* – CE 5. Josh Vaughan – WG 6. Stephen Sheppard – FE 7. Chris Sheppard (c) – HB 15. Ben Laity – PR 20. David Faiumu* – HK 22. Ben Vaeau* – PR 11. Matthew Bartlett* – SR 12. Joel Riethmuller – SR 13. Mark Cantoni – LK
Interchange: 14. Warren Jensen, 16. Greg Byrnes, 19. Noel Underwood, 21. Alex Starmer.
* = Cowboys allocation (4 players allocated for this match).
Unavailable: Ryan Bartlett (ACL)
Redcliffe Dolphins: 1. Ryan Cullen, 2. Mitch Rivett, 3. Chris Fox, 4. Tim Yee, 5. Liam Georgetown, 6. Marty Turner, 7. Craig Priestly, 8. , 9. Nathan Tutt, 10. anny Burke, 11. Grant Flugge, 12. James Crombie, 13. Michael Roberts.
Interchange: 14. Brian West, 15. Derricke Watkins, 16. Michael Wilson, 17. Palmer Wapau.
Coach: Gary O'Brien.
- Note: This was the Pride debut for Cowboys' players Ty Williams* and David Faiumu* (Pride Players 020 & 024).

Position	Round 2 – 2008	P	W	D	L	B	For	Against	Diff	Pts
1	Northern Pride	2	2	0	0	0	76	34	+42	4

ROUND 3: Wizard Queensland Cup 2008

Saturday
29 March 2008
18:00 AEST (UTC+10)

Northern Pride	46 – 12	Norths Devils
Tries: Brett Anderson 1 Chris Sheppard (c) 1 Mark Cantoni 1 Joel Riethmuller 1 Matthew Bartlett* 1 Jason Roos 1 Ben Vaeau* 1 Ben Laity 1 Goals: Chey Bird 7 (7 from 8)	Cairns Post Report	Tries: 2 Luke Samoa Goals: 1 Patrick Fray; 1 Haisley Robson

Barlow Park
(Severin Street, Parramatta Park, QLD)
Referee: Justin Davis.
Touch judges: Michael Inman, Darryl Bell.
Interchange Official: Daniel Caamano.

CRGT Northern Pride: 1. Chey Bird – FB 2. Gordon Rattler – WG 3. Brett Anderson – CE 4. Josh Vaughan – CE 5. John Williams* – WG 6. Jackson Nicolau* – FE 7. Chris Sheppard (c) – HB 20. Ben Vaeau* – PR 9. Jason Roos – HK 10. Steve Southern* – PR 11. Matthew Bartlett* – SR 12. Joel Riethmuller – SR 13. Mark Cantoni – LK
Interchange: 14. Warren Jensen, 15. Ben Laity, 16. Greg Byrnes, 17. Scott Bolton*.
* = Cowboys allocation (6 players allocated for this match).
Unavailable: Ryan Bartlett (ACL), Steven Sheppard (sternum)
Northern Suburbs Devils: 1. Todd Parnell, 2. Denan Kemp, 3. Patrick Fray, 4. Luke Samoa, 5. George Kepa, 6. Joel Moon, 7. Jacob Fauid, 13. Jack Pearson, 12. Billy Rogers, 11. Matt Forrest, 10. Ryan Barton, 9. Marc Brentnall (c), 8. Blake Blackburn.
Interchange: 14. Fletcher Holmes, 15. Luke Brosnan, 16. Troy Hansen, 17. Simona Vavega.
Coach: Mark Gee.
- Note: This was the Pride debut for Cowboy's players Steve Southern*, Scott Bolton*, and John Williams* (Pride Players 018, 019 & 021).

Position	Round 3 – 2008	P	W	D	L	B	For	Against	Diff	Pts
1	Northern Pride	3	3	0	0	0	122	46	+76	6

ROUND 4: Wizard Queensland Cup 2008

Saturday
5 April 2008
18:00 AEST (UTC+10)

Burleigh Bears	8 – 18	Northern Pride
Tries: Adam Fielder 2 Goals: 0	Cairns Post Report	Tries: 1 Jackson Nicolau*; 1 Ben Laity; 1 David Faiumu*; Goals: 3 Chey Bird

Pizzey Park
(Miami, Gold Coast, QLD)
Referee: Clayton Sharpe.
Touch judges: Peter Anderson, Robert Grogan.
Interchange Official: David Shaw.

CRGT Northern Pride: 1. Chey Bird – FB 2. Gordon Rattler – WG 3. Brett Anderson – CE 4. Josh Vaughan – CE 5. Drew Campbell – WG 6. 6. Jackson Nicolau* – FE 7. Chris Sheppard (c) – HB 20. Ben Vaeau* – PR 9. Jason Roos – HK 10. Ben Laity – PR 11. Matthew Bartlett* – SR 12. Joel Riethmuller – SR 13. Mark Cantoni – LK
Interchange: 14. Warren Jensen, 16. Greg Byrnes, 17. Scott Bolton*, 18. David Faiumu*.
* = Cowboys allocation (5 players allocated for this match).
Unavailable: Ryan Bartlett (ACL).
Burleigh Bears: 1. Nick Parfitt, 2. Trent Purdon, 3. Troy Savage, 4. Adam Fielder, 5. Aseri Laing, 6. Brent Mcconnell, 7. Ben Black, 13. John Flint, 12. Adam Hutchison, 11. Martin Griese, 10. Wayne Phillis, 9. Scott Smith, 8. Shane O'Flanagan.
Interchange: 14. Matt Briggs, 15. Pele Peletelese, 16. Stacey Katu, 17. Robert Apanui.
Coach: Jimmy Lenihan.
- Note: This was the Pride debut for Drew Campbell (Pride Player 023).

Position	Round 4 – 2008	P	W	D	L	B	For	Against	Diff	Pts
1	Northern Pride	4	4	0	0	0	140	54	+86	8

ROUND 5: Wizard Queensland Cup 2008

Saturday
12 April 2008
14:00 AEST (UTC+10)

Souths Logan Magpies	24 – 34	Northern Pride
Tries: Quentin Laulu Togagae 3 Lewis Balcomb 1 Goals: Michael Dobson 4	Half-time: 6 – 24	Tries: 1 Chey Bird; 1 Brett Anderson; 1 Josh Vaughan; 1 Chris Sheppard; 1 Joel Riethmuller; 1 Greg Byrnes; Goals: 5 Chey Bird

Meakin Park
(Logan, QLD)
Broadcast live on ABC 1 TV
Referee: Michael Wise.
Touch judges: Justin Davis, Chris Butler.
Interchange Official: Robert Grogan.
Video Referee: Tony Maksoud.
Player of the Match: Greg Byrnes

CRGT Northern Pride: 1. Chey Bird – FB 2. Gordon Rattler – WG 3. Brett Anderson – CE 4. Hezron Murgha – CE 5. Josh Vaughan – WG , 6. Stephen Sheppard – FE 7. Chris Sheppard (c) – HB 8. Scott Bolton* – PR 9. David Faiumu* – HK 10. Ben Laity – PR 11. Warren Jensen – SR 12. Joel Riethmuller – SR 13. Mark Cantoni – LK
Interchange: 14. Jason Roos, 15. Alex Starmer, 16. Greg Byrnes, 17. Noel Underwood.
* = Cowboys allocation (2 players allocated for this match).
Unavailable: Ryan Bartlett (ACL).
Souths Logan Magpies: 1. Quentin Laulu Togagae, 2. Shea Moylan, 3. Brad Cross, 4. Chad Grintell, 5. Kyle Lodge, 6. Marc Herbert, 7. Michael Dobson, 13. Josh White, 12. Lewis Balcomb, 11. Tim Cannard, 10. Cy Lasscock, 9. Glen Buttriss, 8. Daniel Joyce.
Interchange: 14. Brogan Gibson, 15. Nick Colley, 16. Mckanah Gibson, 17. Phil Dennis.
Coach: Paul Bramley.
- Note: Broadcast live on ABC 1 TV with ABC Sport's Gerry Collins, Warren Boland and David Wright.
  This was Brett Anderson last game before leaving to play for Melbourne Storm. He returned to the Pride in 2010.
  The Pride were down by 18 points at half-time, but they scored 28 unanswered points in the second half for a dramatic come-from-behind win.
  This was the Pride debut for Hezron Murgha (Player 023).

Position	Round 5 – 2008	P	W	D	L	B	For	Against	Diff	Pts
2	Northern Pride	5	5	0	0	0	174	78	+96	10

ROUND 6: Wizard Queensland Cup 2008

Saturday
19 April 2008
18:00 AEST (UTC+10)

Northern Pride	30 – 28	Easts Tigers
Tries: Jason Roos 2 Gordon Rattler 1 Jackson Nicolau* 1 Josh Vaughan 1 Adam Mills 1 Goals: Chey Bird 3	Cairns Post Report	Tries: 2 Tangi Ropati; 1 Kev Stephensen; 1 Marcus Jensen; 1 Trent Young Goals: 3 Matt Lockyer; 1 Isaac Kaufmann

Barlow Park
(Severin Street, Parramatta Park, QLD)
Referee: Nick Kalpakidis.
Touch judges: Darryl Bell, Greg Watt.
Interchange Official: Daniel Caamano.

CRGT Northern Pride: 1. Chey Bird – FB 2. Gordon Rattler – WG 3. Jackson Nicolau* – CE 4. Hezron Murgha – CE 5. Josh Vaughan – WG 6. Stephen Sheppard – FE 7. Chris Sheppard (c) – HB 20. Ben Vaeau* – PR 19. Jason Roos – HK 10. Ben Laity – PR 11. Scott Bolton* – SR 12. Joel Riethmuller – SR 13. Mark Cantoni – LK
Interchange: 15. Warren Jensen, 16. Greg Byrnes, 17. Alex Starmer, 18. Adam Mills.
* = Cowboys allocation (3 players allocated for this match).'
Unavailable: Quincy To'oto'o-ulugia (ribs), Brett Anderson (transferred to the Melbourne Storm), Ryan Bartlett (ACL).
Easts Tigers: 1. Wade Liddell, 2. Tangi Ropati, 3. Liam Capewell, 4. Matt Gruszka, 5. Kev Stephensen, 6. Isaac Kaufmann, 7. Jason Connors, 13. Scott Sipple, 12. Marcus Jensen, 11. Anthony Boyd, 10. Fred Tila, 9. Trent Young, 8. Charles Tonga.
Interchange: 14. Josh Griffith, 15. Cameron Durnford, 16. Tom Macgougan, 17. Matt Lockyer.
Coach: Darren Smith.
- Note: Stephen Sheppard was sent from the field in the second half and Joel Riethmuller suffered a season ending knee injury.
  This was the Pride debut for Adam Mills (Player 025).

Position	Round 6 – 2008	P	W	D	L	B	For	Against	Diff	Pts
2	Northern Pride	6	6	0	0	0	204	106	+98	12

ROUND 7: Wizard Queensland Cup 2008

Saturday
26 April 2008
18:00 AEST (UTC+10)

Northern Pride	40 – 10	Central Comets
Tries: Drew Campbell 2 Greg Byrnes 2 Hezron Murgha 1 Josh Vaughan 1 Jackson Nicolau* 1 Goals: Chey Bird 6	Cairns Post Report	Tries: 1 Nat Bowman; 1 Wayne Barnett Goals: 1 Jimmy Radloff

Barlow Park
(Severin Street, Parramatta Park, QLD)
Referee: Gavin Morris.
Touch judges: Darryl Bell, Daniel Caamano.
Interchange Official: Mark Leigh.

CRGT Northern Pride: 1. Chey Bird – FB 2. Drew Campbell – WG 3. Ty Williams* – CE 4. Hezron Murgha – CE 5. Josh Vaughan – WG 6. Jackson Nicolau* – FE 7. Chris Sheppard (c) – HB 8. Greg Byrnes – PR 9. Jason Roos – HK 10. Ben Vaeau* – PR 11. Alex Starmer – SR 12. Mark Cantoni – SR 13. Warren Jensen – LK
Interchange: 15. Adam Mills, 16. Noel Underwood, 17. Ben Laity, 18. David Faiumu*.
* = Cowboys allocation (4 players allocated for this match).
Unavailable: Joel Riethmuller (knee), Brett Anderson (transferred to the Melbourne Storm), Stephen Sheppard (sternum), Ryan Bartlett (ACL).
Tweed Heads Seagulls: 1. Ryan Milligan, 2. Cameron White, 3. Dennis Gordon, 4. James Wood, 5. Joel Rapana, 6. Brad Davis (c), 7. Tim Maccan, 13. Clint Amos, 12. Selasi Berdie, 11. Chris Enahoro, 10. Chris Farrell, 9. Matt King, 8. Roy Friend.
Interchange: 14. Billy Ngawini, 15. Adam Mansy, 16. Brock Hunter, 17. Michael Henderson.
Central Comets: 1. Nat Bowman, 2. Marty Hatfield, 3. Karl Johnson, 4. Guy Williams, 5. Jimmy Radloff, 6. Wayne Barnett, 7. Marc Fickling, 13. Mick Esdale, 12. Todd Titmus, 11. Brent Williams, 10. Brenton Williamson, 9. Kam Wilkinson, 8. Luke Fatnowna.
Interchange: 14. Logan Sullivan, 15. Matt Minto, 16. George Tuakura, 17. Luke Scott.
Coach: Wayne Barnett.
- Note: This was the Pride's seventh game and their seventh win.

Position	Round 7 – 2008	P	W	D	L	B	For	Against	Diff	Pts
1	Northern Pride	7	7	0	0	0	244	116	+128	14

ROUND 8: Wizard Queensland Cup 2008

Saturday
3 May 2008
14:00 AEST (UTC+10)

Tweed Heads Seagulls	34 – 4	Northern Pride
Tries: Selasi Berdie 2 Dennis Gordon 1 Luke Dumas 1 Shane Joyce 1 Brad Davis 1 Goals: Brad Davis 5	Cairns Post Report	Tries: 1 Hezron Murgha Goals: 0

Ned Byrne Oval, Cudgen Park
(Kingscliff. NSW)
Broadcast live on ABC 1 TV
Referee: Clayton Sharpe.
Touch judges: Rod Spain, David Shaw.
Interchange Official: Daniel Gigliotti.
Video Referee: Rex Little.

CRGT Northern Pride: 1. Chey Bird – FB 2. Drew Campbell – WG 3. Jackson Nicolau* – CE 4. Hezron Murgha – CE 5. Josh Vaughan – WG 6. Stephen Sheppard – FE 7. Chris Sheppard (c) – HB 8. Greg Byrnes – PR 9. Jason Roos – HK 10. Scott Bolton* – PR 18. Matthew Bartlett* – SR 12. David Faiumu* – SR 13. Mark Cantoni – LK
Interchange: 11. Alex Starmer, 14. Warren Jensen, 15. Adam Mills, 17. Ben Laity.
* = Cowboys allocation (3 players allocated for this match).
Unavailable: Joel Riethmuller (knee), Brett Anderson (transferred to the Melbourne Storm), Ryan Bartlett (ACL).
Tweed Heads Seagulls: 1. Ryan Milligan, 2. Cameron White, 3. Dennis Gordon, 4. James Wood, 5. Joel Rapana, 6. Brad Davis (c), 7. Tim Maccan, 13. Clint Amos, 12. Selasi Berdie, 11. Chris Enahoro, 10. Chris Farrell, 9. Matt King, 8. Roy Friend.
Interchange: 14. Billy Ngawini, 15. Adam Mansy, 16. Brock Hunter, 17. Michael Henderson.
- Note: Broadcast live on ABC 1 TV with ABC Sport's Gerry Collins, Warren Boland and David Wright.
  This was the Pride's first defeat after eight rounds of the competition.

Position	Round 8 – 2008	P	W	D	L	B	For	Against	Diff	Pts
2	Northern Pride	8	7	0	1	0	248	150	+98	14

ROUND 9: Wizard Queensland Cup 2008

10–11 May 2008

Northern Pride	BYE

Position	Round 9 – 2008	P	W	D	L	B	For	Against	Diff	Pts
2	Northern Pride	8	7	0	1	1	248	150	+98	16

ROUND 10: Wizard Queensland Cup 2008

Saturday
17 May 2008
18:00 AEST (UTC+10)

Northern Pride	16 – 26	Wynnum Manly Seagulls
Tries: Drew Campbell 1 Hezron Murgha 1 Stephen Sheppard 1 Goals: Chey Bird 2	Cairns Post Report; Cairns Post Report	Tries: 1 Jason Moon; 1 Dallas McIlwain; 1 Luke Dalziel Don; 1 Chris Muckert; Goals: 5 Matt Seamark

Barlow Park
(Severin Street, Parramatta Park, QLD)
Referee: Michael Wise
Touch judges: Michael Inman, Greg Watt
Interchange Official: Daniel Caamano

CRGT Northern Pride: 1. Chey Bird – FB 6. Josh Vaughan – WG 3. Drew Campbell – CE 4. Adam Mills (centre) – CE 5. Hezron Murgha – WG 18. Stephen Sheppard – FE 7. Chris Sheppard (c) – HB 8. Ben Laity – PR 9. Jason Roos – HK 10. Scott Bolton* – PR 11. Matthew Bartlett* – SR 12. Mark Cantoni – SR 13. Ben Kerr – LK
Interchange: 14. Richie Marsters, 15. Warren Jensen, 16. Noel Underwood, 17. Greg Byrnes.
* = Cowboys allocation (2 players allocated for this match).
Unavailable: Joel Riethmuller (knee), Brett Anderson (transferred to the Melbourne Storm, Ryan Bartlett (ACL), Quincy To'oto'o-ulugia (knee), Alex Starmer (shoulder).
Wynnum-Manly Seagulls: 1. David Seage, 2. Jason Moon, 3. Simon Phillips, 4. Chris Mcqueen, 5. Chris Currie, 6. Chris Birch, 7. Matt Seamark, 13. Dallas Mcilwain, 12. Adam Brideson, 11. Luke Dalziel Don, 10. Ben Czislowski, 9. Aoterangi Herangi, 8. Jason Williams.
Interchange: 14. Chris Muckert, 15. Fili Sofa, 16. John Te Reo, 17. Darren Bain.
Coach: Shane Mcnally.
- Note: This was the Pride debut for Ben Kerr and Richie Marsters (Players 027 & 028).
  Chris Afamasaga from the Gold Coast Titans and Jamie Frizzo from the North Queensland Cowboys signed to the Pride this week.

Position	Round 10 – 2008	P	W	D	L	B	For	Against	Diff	Pts
3	Northern Pride	9	7	0	2	1	264	176	+88	16

ROUND 11: Wizard Queensland Cup 2008

Saturday
24 May 2008
14:- AEST (UTC+10)

Ipswich Jets	16 – 30	Northern Pride
Tries: Brendan Marshall 1 Ian Lacey 1 Aaron Sweeney 1 Goals: Josh Lewis 2	Half-time: 10 – 16; Cairns Post Report; Cairns Post Report; Cairns Post Report	Tries: 2 Chey Bird; 1 Matthew Bartlett*; 1 Scott Bolton*; 1 Ben Vaeau*; Goals: 5 Chey Bird

Briggs Rd Sporting Complex
(Ipswich, QLD)
Broadcast live on ABC 1 TV
Referee: Gavin Morris.
Touch judges: Rod Spain, Chris Butler.
Interchange Official: Daniel Griffin.
Video Referee: Tony Maksoud.
Player of the Match: Chey Bird.

CRGT Northern Pride: 1. Chey Bird – FB 2. Drew Campbell – WG 3. Jamie Frizzo – CE 4. Hezron Murgha – CE 5. Josh Vaughan – WG 6. Jackson Nicolau* – FE 7. Chris Sheppard (c) – HB 20. Ben Vaeau* – PR 9. Quincy To'oto'o-ulugia – HK 10. Ben Laity – PR 11. Scott Bolton* – SR 18. Matthew Bartlett* – SR 13. Mark Cantoni – LK
Interchange: 15. 15. Alex Starmer, 16. Warren Jensen, 17. Greg Byrnes, 21. Chris Afamasaga.
* = Cowboys allocation (3 players allocated for this match).
Unavailable: Joel Riethmuller (knee), Brett Anderson (transferred to the Melbourne Storm, Ryan Bartlett (ACL).
Ipswich Jets: 1. Troy O'Sullivan, 2. Scott Ireland, 3. Donald Malone, 4. Jason Bulgarelli, 5. Brendan Marshall, 6. Josh Lewis, 7. Ian Lacey, 13. Danny Coburn, 12. Kris Kahler, 11. Trevor Exton, 10. Isaak Ah Mau, 9. Michael Ryan, 8. Aaron Sweeney.
Interchange: 14. Todd Riggs, 15. Matthew Mcphee, 16. Scott Alo, 17. Leigh Coghill.
Coach: Kevin Walters.
- Note: Broadcast live on ABC 1 TV with ABC Sport's Gerry Collins, Warren Boland and David Wright.
  This was the Pride debut for Quincy To'oto'o-ulugia, Jamie Frizzo, and Chris Afamasaga (Players 026, 029 & 030).

Position	Round 11 – 2008	P	W	D	L	B	For	Against	Diff	Pts
2	Northern Pride	10	8	0	2	1	294	192	+102	18

ROUND 12: Wizard Queensland Cup 2008

Saturday
7 June 2008
19:00 AEST (UTC+10)

Mackay Cutters	12 – 18	Northern Pride
Tries: Dean Tass 1 George Gatis 1 Goals: Todd Seymour 2	Cairns Post Report	Tries: 2 Jackson Nicolau*; 1 Greg Byrnes; Goals: 3 Chey Bird.

Mackay Junior Fields
(Bridge Road, South Mackay, QLD)
Referee: Nick Kalpakidis.
Touch judges: Clinton Begg, Chris Anderson.
Interchange Official: Zane Wright.

CRGT Northern Pride: 1. Chey Bird – FB 2. Drew Campbell – WG 16. Jamie Frizzo – CE 4. Hezron Murgha – CE 5. Josh Vaughan – WG 6. Jackson Nicolau* – FE 7. Chris Sheppard (c) – HB 8. Ben Laity – PR 9. Jason Roos – HK 10. Ben Vaeau* – PR 20. Adam Mills – SR 12. Greg Byrnes – SR 13. Mark Cantoni – LK
Interchange: 14. Warren Jensen, 15. Alex Starmer, 17. Chris Afamasaga, 18. Ben Kerr.
* = Cowboys allocation (3 players allocated for this match).
Unavailable: Joel Riethmuller (knee), Brett Anderson (transferred to the Melbourne Storm, Ryan Bartlett (ACL).
Skills Training Mackay Cutters: 1. Daniel Flynn, 2. Chris Giumelli, 3. Royston Lightning, 4. Anthony Perkins, 5. Dean Tass, 6. Shane Muspratt, 7. Todd Seymour, 13. Keiron Lander, 12. Dayne Weston, 11. Kerrod Toby, 10. John Frith, 9. George Gatis, 8. Joshua Rovelli.
Interchange: 14. Luke Srama, 15. Cody Norton, 16. Brendan Crouch, 17. Quinton Fielder.
Coach: Shane Muspratt.
- Note: Rod Griffin signed with the Pride this week.

Position	Round 12 – 2008	P	W	D	L	B	For	Against	Diff	Pts
2	Northern Pride	11	9	0	2	1	312	204	+108	20

ROUND 13: Wizard Queensland Cup 2008

Saturday
14 June 2008
18:00 AEST (UTC+10)

Northern Pride	0 – 26	Redcliffe Dolphins
Tries: Goals:	Cairns Post Report	Tries: 2 Nick Emett; 1 Ryan Cullen; 1 Liam Georgetown; 1 Chris Fox; Goals: 3 Marty Turner

Barlow Park
(Severin Street, Parramatta Park, QLD)
Referee: Justin Davis.
Touch judges: Greg Watt, Daniel Caamano.
Interchange Official: Michael Inman.

CRGT Northern Pride: 1. Chey Bird – FB 2. Drew Campbell – WG 16. Ty Williams* – CE 4. Hezron Murgha – CE 5. Josh Vaughan – WG 6. Jackson Nicolau* – FE 19. Stephen Sheppard – HB 8. Ben Laity (c) – PR 9. Quincy To'oto'o-ulugia – HK 10. Ben Vaeau* – PR 16. Scott Bolton* – SR 12. 12. Greg Byrnes – SR 13. Mark Cantoni – LK
Interchange: 14. Warren Jensen, 15. Alex Starmer, 17. Chris Afamasaga, 18. Adam Mills.
* = Cowboys allocation (5 players allocated for this match).
Unavailable: Joel Riethmuller (knee), Brett Anderson (transferred to the Melbourne Storm, Ryan Bartlett (ACL), Chris Sheppard (representative duties).
Redcliffe Dolphins: 1. Ryan Cullen, 2. Kaine Manihera, 3. Chris Fox, 4. Matt Harris, 5. Tim Yee, 6. Michael Wilson, 7. Shane Perry, 13. Nathan Tutt, 12. Danny Burke, 11. Grant Flugge, 10. James Crombie, 9. Michael Roberts, 8. Troy Lindsay.
Interchange: 14. Derrick Watkins, 15. Nick Walker, 16. Brian West, 17. Lachlan Morgan.
Coach: Gary O'Brien.
- Note: In the second half Mark Cantoni was taken to hospital with a broken arm.

Position	Round 13 – 2008	P	W	D	L	B	For	Against	Diff	Pts
3	Northern Pride	12	9	0	3	1	312	230	+82	20

ROUND 14: Wizard Queensland Cup 2008

Sunday
22 June 2008
14:00 AEST (UTC+10)

Norths Devils	24 – 40	Northern Pride
Tries: Rodney Davies 2 George Kepa 2 Reece Robinson 1 Goals: Luke Samoa 2	Cairns Post Report; Cairns Post Report	Tries: 2 Drew Campbell; 2 Josh Vaughan; 1 Quincy To'oto'o-ulugia; 1 Ben Vaeau*; 1 Jason Roos; Goals: 5 Chey Bird; 1Quincy To'oto'o-ulugia

Albert Bishop Park
(Hedley Avenue, Nundah QLD)
Referee: Clayton Sharpe.
Touch judges: Nick Kalpakidis, David Shaw.
Interchange Official: Nick Morel.

CRGT Northern Pride: 1. Chey Bird – FB 2. Drew Campbell – WG 16. Ty Williams* – CE 4. Jamie Frizzo – CE 5. Josh Vaughan – WG 6. Jackson Nicolau* – FE 7. Quincy To'oto'o-ulugia – HB 8. Ben Laity (c) – PR 9. Jason Roos – HK 10. Ben Vaeau* – PR 11. Alex Starmer – SR 17. Chris Afamasaga – SR 13. Adam Mills – LK
Interchange: 14. Hezron Murgha, 15. Rod Griffin, 16. Warren Jensen, 18. Noel Underwood.
* = Cowboys allocation (3 players allocated for this match).
Unavailable: Joel Riethmuller (knee), Brett Anderson (transferred to the Melbourne Storm, Ryan Bartlett (ACL), Chris Sheppard (representative duties), Greg Byrnes (representative duties), Mark Cantoni (broken arm).
Northern Suburbs Devils: 1. Todd Parnell, 2. Reece Robinson, 3. Rodney Davies, 4. Luke Samoa, 5. David Kramer, 6. Sean Yorston, 7. Jack Pearson, 13. Billy Rogers, 12. Troy Hansen, 11. Matthew Forrest, 10. Blake Blackburn, 9. Fletcher Holmes, 8. Andrew Lomu.
Interchange: 14. Simona Vavega, 15. Jarrad Stack, 16. Nathan Strudwick, 17. Tariq Sims.
Coach: Mark Gee.
- Note: This was the Pride debut for Rod Griffin (Player 031).

Position	Round 14 – 2008	P	W	D	L	B	For	Against	Diff	Pts
3	Northern Pride	13	10	0	3	1	352	254	+98	22

ROUND 15: Wizard Queensland Cup 2008

Saturday
28 June 2008
18:00 AEST (UTC+10)

Northern Pride	28 – 12	Burleigh Bears
Tries: Drew Campbell 1 Jamie Frizzo 1 Rod Griffin 1 Jason Roos 1 Chris Afamasaga 1 Goals: Quincy To'oto'o-ulugia 4	Cairns Post Report	Tries: 1 Adam Hutchison; 1 Martin Griese Goals: 2 Nick Parfitt

Barlow Park
(Severin Street, Parramatta Park, QLD)
Referee: Gavin Morris.
Touch judges: Greg Watt, Daniel Caamano.
Interchange Official: Darryl Bell.

CRGT Northern Pride: 1. Ty Williams* – FB 2. Drew Campbell – WG 3. Hezron Murgha – CE 4. Jamie Frizzo – CE 5. Josh Vaughan – WG 6. Jackson Nicolau* – FE 7. Quincy To'oto'o-ulugia – HB 8. Ben Laity (c) – PR 9. Jason Roo – HK 10. Alex Starmer – PR 18. Luke Harlen – SR 12. Rod Griffin – SR 13. Adam Mills – LK
Interchange: 14. Gordon Rattler, 15. Noel Underwood, 16. Ben Kerr, 17. Chris Afamasaga.
* = Cowboys allocation (3 players allocated for this match).
Unavailable: Joel Riethmuller (knee), Brett Anderson (transferred to the Melbourne Storm, Ryan Bartlett (ACL), Mark Cantoni (broken arm), Chey Bird (sternum).
Burleigh Bears: 1. Nick Parfitt, 2. Trent Purdon, 3. Dave Tehuia, 4. Adam Fielder, 5. Aseri Laing, 6. Brent Mcconnell, 7. Murray Emmerson, 13. Robert Apanui, 12. Shane O'Flanagan, 11. Martin Griese, 10. James Griffiths, 9. Scott Smith, 8. Wayne Phillis.
Interchange: 14. Pele Peletelese, 15. Josh Blatch, 16. Travis Simpson, 17. John Flint.
Coach: Jimmy Lenihan.
- Note: This was the Pride debut for Luke Harlen (Player 032) who signed with the Pride this week after being released from Wests Tigers.

Position	Round 15 – 2008	P	W	D	L	B	For	Against	Diff	Pts
3	Northern Pride	14	11	0	4	1	380	266	+114	22

ROUND 16: Wizard Queensland Cup 2008

Saturday
5 July 2008
18:00 AEST (UTC+10)

Northern Pride	16 – 12	Souths Logan Magpies
Tries: Ty Williams* 1 Drew Campbell 1 Rod Griffin 1 Goals: Chris Sheppard 2	Cairns Post Report	Tries: 1 Brad Cross; 1 Tom Learoyd Lahrs Goals: 2 Marc Herbert

Barlow Park
(Severin Street, Parramatta Park, QLD)
Referee: Justin Eastwood.
Touch judges: Michael Inman, Greg Watt.
Interchange Official: Darryl Bell.

CRGT Northern Pride: 1. Ty Williams* – FB 2. Drew Campbell – WG 3. Hezron Murgha – CE 4. Jamie Frizzo – CE 5. Josh Vaughan – WG 6. Jackson Nicolau* – FE 7. Chris Sheppard (c) – HB 8. Ben Laity – PR 9. Jason Roos – HK 10. Greg Byrnes – PR 11. Luke Harlen – SR 12. Rod Griffin – SR 13. Adam Mills – LK
Interchange: 14. Quincy To'oto'o-ulugia, 15. Noel Underwood, 16. Alex Starmer, 17. Chris Afamasaga.
* = Cowboys allocation (2 players allocated for this match).
Unavailable: Joel Riethmuller (knee), Brett Anderson (transferred to the Melbourne Storm, Ryan Bartlett (ACL), Mark Cantoni (broken arm), Chey Bird (sternum).
Souths Logan Magpies: 1. Quentin Laulu Togagae, 2. Chad Grintell, 3. Brad Cross, 4. Shea Moylan, 5. Kyle Lodge, 6. Marc Herbert, 7. Phil Dennis, 13. Shaun Fensom, 12. Josh White, 11. Lewis Balcomb, 10. Cy Lasscock, 9. Paul Stanley, 8. Daniel Joyce.
Interchange: 14. Sam Mataora, 15. Brendan Waller, 16. Pere Williams, 17. Tim Cannard.
Coach: Paul Bramley.
- Note: The Dawsons Engineering FNQ Cyclones side played the opening game as part of the ARL Masters National Carnival.

Position	Round 16 – 2008	P	W	D	L	B	For	Against	Diff	Pts
3	Northern Pride	15	2	0	3	1	396	278	+118	26

ROUND 17: Wizard Queensland Cup 2008

Saturday
12 July 2008
14:00 AEST (UTC+10)

Easts Tigers	10 – 26	Northern Pride
Tries: Liam Campbell 1 Marcus Jensen 1 Goals: Matt Lockyer 1		Tries: 2 Jamie Frizzo; 1 Drew Campbell; 1 Josh Vaughan; 1 Matthew Bartlett*; Goals: 3 Quincy To'oto'o-ulugia

Langlands Park
(Stones Corner, Brisbane, QLD)
Broadcast live on ABC 1 TV
Referee: Gavin Morris.
Touch judges: Justin Davis, Michael Inman.
Interchange Official: Jon Kennedy.
Video Referee: Tony Maksoud.

CRGT Northern Pride: 1. Ty Williams* – FB 2. Drew Campbell – WG 3. Hezron Murgha – CE 4. Jamie Frizzo – CE 5. Josh Vaughan – WG 6. Jackson Nicolau* – FE 7. Chris Sheppard (c) – HB 8. Ben Laity – PR 9. Jason Roos – HK 10. Luke Harlen – PR 11. Matthew Bartlett* – SR 12. Rod Griffin – SR 13. Adam Mills – LK
Interchange: 14. Quincy To'oto'o-ulugia, 15. Noel Underwood, 16. Alex Starmer, 17. Chris Afamasaga.
* = Cowboys allocation (3 players allocated for this match).
Unavailable: Joel Riethmuller (knee), Brett Anderson (transferred to the Melbourne Storm, Ryan Bartlett (ACL), Mark Cantoni (broken arm), Chey Bird (sternum).
Easts Tigers: 1. Kev Stephensen, 2. Tangi Ropati, 3. Liam Campbell, 4. Luke Wright, 5. Luke Archer, 6. Matt Lockyer, 7. Nathan Pill, 13. Wallace Solomona, 12. Scott Sipple, 11. Marcus Jensen, 10. Fabian Soutar, 9. Trent Henrick, 8. Pat Gardner.
Interchange: 14. Walter Vaeau, 15. John Reece, 16. Fred Tila, 17. Wade Liddell.
Coach: Darren Smith.
- Note: Broadcast live on ABC 1 TV with ABC Sport's Gerry Collins, Warren Boland and David Wright.

Position	Round 17 – 2008	P	W	D	L	B	For	Against	Diff	Pts
1	Northern Pride	16	13	0	3	1	422	288	+134	28

ROUND 18: Wizard Queensland Cup 2008

Saturday
19 July 2008
19:30 AEST (UTC+10)

Central Comets	28 – 16	Northern Pride
Tries: Marty Hatfield 2 Guy Williams 1 Nat Bowman 1 Andrew Dale 1 Goals: Nat Bowman 4	Cairns Post Report; Cairns Post Report	Tries: 1 Hezron Murgha; 1 Gordon Rattler; 1 Quincy To'oto'o-ulugia Goals: 2 Chris Sheppard

Browne Park
(Wandal, Rockhampton, QLD)
Referee: Justin Eastwood.
Touch judges: Steve Kanowski, Jason McManus.
Interchange Official: Aaron Geddes.

CRGT Northern Pride: 1. Josh Vaughan – FB 2. Drew Campbell – WG 3. Hezron Murgha – CE 4. Jamie Frizzo – CE 5. Gordon Rattler – WG 6. Jackson Nicolau* – FE 7. Chris Sheppard (c) – HB 8. Ben Laity – PR 9. Jason Roos – HK 10. Greg Byrnes – PR 18. Matthew Bartlett* – SR 12. Rod Griffin – SR 13. Adam Mills – LK
Interchange: 11. Noel Underwood, 1. Quincy To'oto'o-ulugia, 16. Alex Starmer, 17. Chris Afamasaga.
* = Cowboys allocation (1 player allocated for this match).
Unavailable: Joel Riethmuller (knee), Brett Anderson (transferred to the Melbourne Storm, Ryan Bartlett (ACL), Mark Cantoni (broken arm), Chey Bird (sternum).
Central Comets: 1. Guy Wiliams, 2. Marty Hatfield, 3. Karl Johnson, 4. Mitchell Zornig, 5. Dallas Williams, 6. Nat Bowman, 7. Marc Fickling, 13. Wayne Barnett, 12. Tyron Haynes, 11. Logan Sullivan, 10. Brent Williams, 9. Shanan Wood, 8. George Tuakura.
Interchange: 14. Todd Titmus, 15. Kam Wilkinson, 16. Andrew Dale, 17. Liam Anlezark.
Coach: Wayne Barnett.

Position	Round 18 – 2008	P	W	D	L	B	For	Against	Diff	Pts
2	Northern Pride	17	13	0	4	1	438	316	+122	28

ROUND 19: Wizard Queensland Cup 2008

Saturday
26 July 2008
18:00 AEST (UTC+10)

Northern Pride	20 – 34	Tweed Heads Seagulls
Tries: Josh Vaughan 2 Luke Millwood 1 Warren Jensen 1 Goals: Chey Bird 2	Cairns Post Report	Tries: 2 Ben Jeffery; 1 Shayne Joyce; 1 James Wood; 1 Matthew Pow; 1 Matt King; Goals: 4 Ben Jeffery; 1 Daniel Evans

Barlow Park
(Severin Street, Parramatta Park, QLD)
Referee: Clayton Sharpe.
Touch judges: Michael Inman, Daniel Caamano.
Interchange Official: Darryl Bell.

CRGT Northern Pride: 1. Chey Bird – FB 2. Gordon Rattler – WG 3. Hezron Murgha – CE 4. Jamie Frizzo – CE 5. Josh Vaughan – WG 6. Chris Sheppard (c) – FE 7. Luke Millwood – HB 8. Ben Laity – PR 9. Jason Roos – HK 10. Alex Starmer – PR 11. Greg Byrnes – SR 12. Rod Griffin – SR 13. Adam Mills – LK
Interchange: 14. Warren Jensen, 15. Noel Underwood, 16. Scott Bolton*, 17. Eric Warria.
* = Cowboys allocation (1 player allocated for this match).
Unavailable: Joel Riethmuller (knee), Brett Anderson (transferred to the Melbourne Storm, Ryan Bartlett (ACL), Mark Cantoni (broken arm), Quincy To'oto'o-ulugia (knee), Drew Campbell (knee), Chris Afamasaga (sternum).
Tweed Heads Seagulls: 1. Shayne Joyce, 2. Luke Dumas, 3. Dennis Gordon, 4. James Wood, 5. Joel Rapana, 6. Daniel Evans, 7. Tim Maccan, 13. Matthew Pow, 12. Adam Mansy, 11. Selasi Berdie, 10. Ian Donnelly, 9. Matt King, 8. Chris Farrell.
Interchange: 14. Billy Ngawini, 15. Jack Rampling, 16. Roy Friend, 17. Andre Amato.
Coach: Michael Woods.
- Note: This was the Pride debut for halfback Luke Millwood and outside back Eric Warria (Players 033 & 034).
  Pride players wore yellow armbands as part of the Cancer Council's National "Call To Arms" campaign. The Pride also contribute $1 from every ticket sold and game day sponsor Skytrans gave a bonus of $100 for every try scored and $50 for every goal converted.

Position	Round 19 – 2008	P	W	D	L	B	For	Against	Diff	Pts
3	Northern Pride	18	13	0	5	1	458	350	+108	28

ROUND 20: Wizard Queensland Cup 2008

2–3 August 2008

Northern Pride	BYE

Position	Round 20 – 2008	P	W	D	L	B	For	Against	Diff	Pts
2	Northern Pride	18	13	0	5	2	458	350	+108	30

ROUND 21: Wizard Queensland Cup 2008

Sunday
10 August 2008
14:00 AEST (UTC+10)

Wynnum Manly Seagulls	36 – 16	Northern Pride
Tries: Jason Moon 1 Chris McQueen 1 Chris Currie 1 Simon Phillips 1 Adam Brideson 1 Darren Bain 1 Aoterangi Herangi 1 Goals: Chris Birch 3 Matt Seamark 1	Cairns Post Report	Tries: 1 Jackson Nicolau*; 1 Josh Vaughan; 1 Mark Cantoni Goals: 2 Chey Bird

BMD Kougari Oval
(Manly West, Brisbane, QLD)
Referee: Justin Davis.
Touch judges: Michael Wise, Andrew Wareham.
Interchange Official: Jon Kennedy.

CRGT Northern Pride: 1. Chey Bird – FB 2. Adam Mills – WG 3. Hezron Murgha – CE 4. Jackson Nicolau* – CE 5. Josh Vaughan – WG 6. Chris Sheppard (c) – FE 7. Luke Millwood – HB 8. Ben Laity – PR 9. Jason Roos – HK 10. Greg Byrnes – PR 16. Scott Bolton* – SR 12. Mark Cantoni – SR 13. Jamie Frizzo – LK
Interchange: 14. Rod Griffin, 15. Noel Underwood, 17. Alex Starmer, 18. Warren Jensen.
* = Cowboys allocation (3 players allocated for this match).
Unavailable: Joel Riethmuller (knee), Brett Anderson (transferred to the Melbourne Storm, Ryan Bartlett (ACL), Chris Afamasaga (resigned).
Wynnum Manly Seagulls: 1. David Seage, 2. Ryan Brown, 3. Jason Moon, 4. Chris Mcqueen, 5. Chris Currie, 6. Chris Birch, 7. Matt Seamark, 13. Simon Phillips, 12. Adam Brideson, 11. Darren Bain, 10. Ben Czislowski, 9. Aoterangi Herangi, 8. Jason Williams.
Interchange: 14. Chris Muckert, 15. Angus Martin, 16. John Te Reo, 17. Guy Ford.
Coach: Shane Mcnally.

Position	Round 21 – 2008	P	W	D	L	B	For	Against	Diff	Pts
3	Northern Pride	19	13	0	6	2	474	386	+88	30

ROUND 22: Wizard Queensland Cup 2008

Saturday
16 August 2008
18:00 AEST (UTC+10)

Northern Pride	20 – 30	Ipswich Jets
Tries: Josh Vaughan 1 Stephen Sheppard 1 Luke Millwood 1 Greg Byrnes 1 Goals: Chey Bird 2	Cairns Post Report	Tries: 2 Smith Samau; 1Donald Malone; 1 Isaak Ah Mau; 1 Aaron Sweeney; 1 Adam Boettcher; Goals: 3 Donald Malone

Barlow Park
(Severin Street, Parramatta Park, QLD)
Referee: Clayton Sharpe.
Touch judges: Michael Inman, Darryl Bell.
Interchange Official: Daniel Caamano.

CRGT Northern Pride: 1. Chey Bird – FB 2. Hezron Murgha – WG 3. Jackson Nicolau* – CE 4. Jamie Frizzo – CE 5. Josh Vaughan – WG 6. Stephen Sheppard – FE 7. Chris Sheppard (c) – HB 8. Ben Laity – PR 9. Jason Roos – HK 10. Scott Bolton* – PR 11. Rod Griffin – SR 12. Mark Cantoni – SR 13. Quincy To'oto'o-ulugia – LK
Interchange: 14. Luke Millwood, 15. Alex Starmer, 16. Greg Byrnes, 18. Luke Harlen.
* = Cowboys allocation (2 players allocated for this match).
Unavailable: Joel Riethmuller (knee), Brett Anderson (transferred to the Melbourne Storm, Ryan Bartlett (ACL), Mark Cantoni (broken arm), Chris Afamasaga (resigned), Adam Mills (ankle).
Ipswich Jets: 1. Troy O'Sullivan, 2. Scott Ireland, 3. Donald Malone, 4. Jason Bulgarelli, 5. Smith Samau, 6. Brendan Marshall, 7. Ian Lacey, 13. Dan Coburn, 12. Trevor Exton, 11. Matthew Mcphee, 10. Isaak Ah Mau, 9. Michael Ryan, 8. Aaron Sweeney.
Interchange: 14. Adam Boettcher, 15. Scott Alo, 16. Danny Coburn, 17. Kurtis Lingwoodock.
Coach: Kevin Walters.

Position	Round 22 – 2008	P	W	D	L	B	For	Against	Diff	Pts
3	Northern Pride	20	13	0	7	2	494	416	+78	30

=== 2008 ladder ===
2008 Queensland Cup
Pos	Team	Pld	W	D	L	B	PF	PA	PD	Pts
1	Ipswich Jets	20	16	0	4	2	656	329	+327	36
2	Souths Logan Magpies (P)	20	14	0	6	2	592	378	+214	32
3	Northern Pride	20	13	0	7	2	494	416	+78	30
4	Wynnum Manly Seagulls	20	11	2	7	2	526	514	+12	28
5	Redcliffe Dolphins	20	11	1	8	2	498	418	+80	27
6	Burleigh Bears	20	11	0	9	2	528	506	+22	26
7	Easts Tigers	20	8	1	11	2	454	462	-8	21
8	Tweed Heads Seagulls	20	7	1	12	2	507	535	-28	19
9	Mackay Cutters	20	7	1	12	2	416	488	-72	19
10	Central Comets	20	7	0	13	2	404	595	-191	18
11	Norths Devils	20	2	0	18	2	288	722	-434	8

==== Northern Pride (regular season 2008) ====
- Win = 13 (6 of 10 home games, 7 of 11 away games)
- Loss = 7 (3 of 10 home games, 4 of 11 away games)

Round	1	2	3	4	5	6	7	8	9	10	11	12	13	14	15	16	17	18	19	20	21	22
Result	W	W	W	W	W	W	W	L	B	L	W	W	L	W	W	W	W	L	L	B	L	L
Ground	H	A	H	A	A	H	H	A	B	H	A	A	H	A	H	H	A	A	H	B	A	H

Source: https://web.archive.org/web/20090914011534/http://www.qrl.com.au/queensland_cup/q_cup_results.php?round_number=24
A = Away; H = Home; B = Bye; W = Win; D = Draw; L = Loss

== Finals Series ==
Qualifying / Elimination Finals
2	Souths Logan	16
3	Northern Pride	40
4	Wynnum Manly	16
5	Redcliffe	50

Major / Minor Semi-finals
1	Ipswich	34
Northern Pride	16
Souths Logan	16
Redcliffe	14

Preliminary Final
Northern Pride	12
Souths Logan	16

Grand Final
Ipswich	18
Souths Logan	24

Finals Week 1 – Qualifying Semi-Final

Sunday
24 August 2008
14:00 AEST (UTC+10)

Souths Logan Magpies	16 – 40	Northern Pride
Tries: Nigel Plum 2 Quentin Laulu Togagae 1 Goals: Tim Cannard 2	Match Report	Tries: 1 Chey Bird; 1 Hezron Murgha; 1 Jamie Frizzo; 1 Josh Vaughan; 1 Mark Cantoni; 1 Luke Harlen; Goals: 8 Chey Bird

Davies Park
(West End, Brisbane, QLD)

CRGT Northern Pride: 1. Chey Bird – FB 2. Hezron Murgha – WG 3. Jackson Nicolau* – CE 4. Jamie Frizzo – CE 5. Josh Vaughan – WG 6. Stephen Sheppard – FE 7. Chris Sheppard (c) – HB 8. Ben Laity – PR 9. Jason Roos – HK 10. Scott Bolton* – PR 11. Luke Harlen – SR 12. Mark Cantoni – SR 13. Rod Griffin – LK
Interchange: 14. Quincy To'oto'o-ulugia, 15. Warren Jensen, 16. Greg Byrnes, 17. Noel Underwood.
* = Cowboys allocation.
Unavailable: Alex Starmer (knee).
Souths Logan Magpies: 1. Quentin Laulu Togagae, 2. Pere Williams, 3. Chad Grintell, 4. Shea Moylan, 5. Mathew Templeman, 6. Brad Cross, 7. Brogan Gibson, 13. Kyle Lodge, 12. Josh White, 11. Tim Cannard, 10. Lewis Balcomb, 9. Mckanah Gibson, 8. Daniel Joyce.
Interchange: 14. Nick Colley, 15. Chris Daly, 16. Sean Mcbride, 17. Liam Mcdonald.
Coach: Paul Bramley.

Finals Week 2 – Qualifying Final

Saturday
30 August 2008
14:00 AEST (UTC+10)

Ipswich Jets	34 – 16	Northern Pride
Tries: Scott Ireland 2 Donald Malone 1 Josh Lewis 1 Kurtis Lingwoodock 1 Leigh Coghill 1 Goals: Josh Lewis 5	Match Report	Tries: 1 Hezron Murgha; 1 Josh Vaughan; 1 Jamie Frizzo Goals: 2 Chey Bird

Briggs Rd Sporting Complex
(Ipswich, QLD)
Broadcast live on ABC 1 TV
Referee: Justin Davis
Touch judges: Clayton Sharpe, Rod Spain
Interchange Officials: Daniel Gicliotti

CRGT Northern Pride: 1. Chey Bird – FB 2. Hezron Murgha – WG 3. Josh Vaughan – CE 4. Jamie Frizzo – CE 5. Adam Mills – WG 6. Jackson Nicolau* – FE 1. Stephen Sheppard – HB 8. Ben Laity – PR 9. Jason Roos – HK 10. Scott Bolton* – PR 20. Ben Vaeau* – SR 12. Mark Cantoni – SR 13. Rod Griffin – LK
Interchange: 16. Greg Byrnes, 17. Noel Underwood, 18. Warren Jensen, 19. Quincy To'oto'o-ulugia.
* = Cowboys allocation.
Unavailable: Chris Sheppard (foot).
Ipswich Jets: 1. Troy O'Sullivan, 2. Scott Ireland, 3. Donald Malone, 4. Brendan Marshall, 5. Smith Samau, 6. Josh Lewis, 7. Ian Lacey, 13. Dan Coburn, 12. Trevor Exton, 11. Kurtis Lingwoodock, 10. Isaak Ah Mau, 9. Michael Ryan, 8. Aaron Sweeney.
Interchange: 14. Adam Boettcher, 15. Matt Mcphee, 16. Leigh Coghill, 17. Jason Bulgarelli.
Coach: Kevin Walters.
- Note: Broadcast live on ABC 1 TV with ABC Sport's Gerry Collins, Warren Boland and David Wright.

Finals Week 3 – Preliminary Final

Saturday
6 September 2008
14:00 AEST (UTC+10)

Northern Pride	12 – 16	Souths Logan Magpies
Tries: Hezron Murgha 1 Jackson Nicolau* 1 Luke Harlen 1 Goals: 0	GOLDEN POINT GAME; Match Report	Tries: 2 Kyle Lodge; 1 Quentin Laulu Togagae Goals: 1 Josh White; 1 Tim Cannard

Langlands Park
(Stones Corner, Brisbane, QLD)
Broadcast live on ABC 1 TV.
Referee: Gavin Morris.
Touch judges: David Shaw, Peter Jones.
Interchange Officials: Peter Anderson.

CRGT Northern Pride: 1. Chey Bird (c) – FB 2. Hezron Murgha – WG 3. Jackson Nicolau* – CE 4. Jamie Frizzo – CE 5. Josh Vaughan – WG 6. Stephen Sheppard – FE 7. Luke Millwood – HB 8. Ben Laity – PR 9. Jason Roos – HK 20. Ben Vaeau* – PR 11. Luke Harlen – SR 21. Scott Bolton* – SR 13. Mark Cantoni – LK
Interchange: 10. Greg Byrnes, 12. Noel Underwood, 14. Callan Myles, 15. Alex Starmer.
* = Cowboys allocation.
Unavailable: Chris Sheppard (foot), Rod Griffin (concussion), Quincy To'oto'o-ulugia.
Souths Logan Magpies: 1. Quentin Laulu Togagae, 2. Mathew Templeman, 3. Kyle Lodge, 4. Chad Grintell, 5. Shea Moylan, 6. Brad Cross, 7. Alby Talipeau, 13. Josh White, 12. Lewis Balcomb, 11. Tim Cannard, 10. Liam Mcdonald, 9. Mckanah Gibson, 8. Daniel Joyce.
Interchange: 14. Graham Levu, 15. Brogan Gibson, 16. Nick Colley, 17. Dashae Francis.
Coach: Paul Bramley.
- Note: The score was 12-all at full time, and Souths Logan Magpies scored after 8 minutes of extra time.
  Broadcast live on ABC 1 TV with ABC Sport's Gerry Collins, Warren Boland and David Wright.
  This was the Pride debut for Callan Myles (Player 035).
  The Pride used 35 different players this season. Ben Laity and Josh Vaughan played all 23 games this season.

== 2008 Northern Pride players ==
Pride player	Appearances	Tries	Goals	Field goals	Pts
Adam Mills	14	1	0	0	4
Alex Starmer	18	0	0	0	0
Ben Kerr	3	0	0	0	0
Ben Laity	23	2	0	0	8
Brett Anderson	5	6	0	0	24
Callan Myles	1	0	0	0	0
Chey Bird	19	5	65	0	150
Chris Afamasaga	8	1	0	0	4
Chris Sheppard	18	2	4	0	16
Drew Campbell	12	8	0	0	32
Eric Warria	1	0	0	0	0
Greg Byrnes	20	6	0	0	24
Gordon Rattler	9	3	0	0	12
Hezron Murgha	19	7	0	0	28
Jamie Frizzo	13	5	0	0	20
Jason Roos	19	5	0	0	20
Joel Riethmuller	6	2	0	0	8
Josh Vaughan	23	13	0	0	52
Luke Harlen	6	2	0	0	8
Luke Millwood	4	2	0	0	8
Mark Cantoni	17	4	0	0	16
Noel Underwood	15	0	0	0	0
Quincy To'oto'o-ulugia	10	2	8	0	24
Richie Marsters	1	0	0	0	0
Rod Griffin	10	2	0	0	8
Stephen Sheppard	11	3	0	0	12
Warren Jensen	17	3	0	0	12
Ryan Bartlett	Trial Game	0	0	0	0
Shaun Cribb	Trial Game	0	0	0	0

=== North Queensland Cowboys who played for the Pride in 2008 ===
Cowboys player	Appearances	Tries	Goals	Field goals	Pts
Ben Vaeau*	12	3	0	0	12
David Faiumu*	5	1	0	0	4
Jackson Nicolau*	19	7	0	0	28
John Williams*	1	0	0	0	0
Matthew Bartlett*	9	4	0	0	16
Scott Bolton*	14	1	0	0	4
Steve Southern*	1	0	0	0	0
Ty Williams*	7	2	0	0	8

== 2008 venues ==
2008 Northern Pride venues

The Pride played matches at 15 different venues this year, 14 in Queensland and one in NSW:

- Albert Bishop Park, Nundah
- Barlow Park, Cairns
- Briggs Rd Sporting Complex, Ipswich
- Browne Park, Rockhampton
- Davies Park, Brisbane
- Dolphin Oval, Redcliffe
- Jilara Oval, Yarrabah
- BMD Kougari Oval, Brisbane
- Langlands Park, Brisbane
- Mann Street Field, Cairns
- Meakin Park, Logan
- Mossman Showgrounds, Mossman
- Cudgen Park, Kingscliff
- Pizzey Park, Gold Coast
- Mackay Junior Fields, Mackay

== 2008 televised games ==
In 2008 games were televised by ABC TV and shown live across Queensland through the ABC1 channel at 2.00pm (AEST) on Saturday afternoons. The commentary team was Gerry Collins, Warren Boland and David Wright.

The Pride appeared in six televised games this season:

- Round 5: Northern Pride beat Souths Logan Magpies 34-24 at Meakin Park, Logan.
- Round 8: Northern Pride lost to Tweed Heads Seagulls 4-34 at Cudgen Park, Kingscliff.
- Round 11: Northern Pride beat Ipswich Jets 30-16 at Briggs Road Sporting Complex, Ipswich.
- Round 17: Northern Pride beat Easts Tigers 26-10 at Langlands Park, Stones Corner, Brisbane
- Qualifying Final: Northern Pride beat Ipswich Jets 34-16 at Briggs Road Sporting Complex, Ipswich.
- Preliminary Final: Northern Pride lost 12-16 to Souths Logan Magpies at Langlands Park, Stones Corner, Brisbane.
