= Aaron Morgan (rugby league) =

Australian rugby league footballer

Personal information
- Born: 21 November 1978 (age 47) Bowen, Queensland, Australia
- Height: 180 cm (5 ft 11 in)
- Weight: 92 kg (14 st 7 lb)

Playing information
- Position: Wing
Club
Years	Team	Pld	T	G	FG	P
2003	North Qld Cowboys	2	2	0	0	8
- Source: As of 2 November 2018

Aaron Morgan (born 21 November 1978) is an Australian former rugby league footballer who played for the North Queensland Cowboys in the National Rugby League. He played as a winger.

== Playing career ==
A Bowen Tigers junior, Morgan was signed by the North Queensland Cowboys for the 2003 season after playing for the Wests Panthers in the Queensland Cup.

In Round 15 of the 2003 NRL season, he made his NRL debut in the Cowboys' 22–24 loss to the Parramatta Eels, starting on the wing and scoring a try. Three weeks later, he made his second and final NRL appearance in the Cowboys' 16–22 loss to the Melbourne Storm, once again starting on the wing and scoring a try.

In 2004, Morgan spent the entire season with the North Queensland Young Guns in the Queensland Cup. In 2005, he joined the Norths Devils, playing three seasons for them before retiring at the end of the 2008 season.

In 2015, he was named on the wing in the Wests Panthers Team of the 2000s by rugby league historian Mike Higginson.

== Statistics ==
=== NRL ===
Statistics are correct to the end of the 2003 season

Season	Team	Matches	T	G	GK %	F/G	Pts
2003	North Queensland	2	2	0	—	0	8
Career totals		2	2	0	—	0	8
