= Daniel Sorbello =

Italy international rugby league footballer

Personal information
- Born: 17 April 1980 (age 45) Mount Isa, Queensland, Australia
- Height: 175 cm (5 ft 9 in)
- Weight: 77 kg (12 st 2 lb)

Playing information
- Position: Fullback
Club
Years	Team	Pld	T	G	FG	P
2003–04	North Qld Cowboys	2	0	0	0	0
Representative
Years	Team	Pld	T	G	FG	P
2004	Italy	1	1	0	0	4
- Source: As of 8 October 2018

Daniel Sorbello (born 17 April 1980) is an Australian former professional rugby league footballer who played for the North Queensland Cowboys in the National Rugby League (NRL). A former Italian international, primarily as a fullback.

== Playing career ==
A Mount Isa junior, Sorbello joined the North Queensland Cowboys in 2003, originally playing for their Queensland Cup side, the North Queensland Young Guns.

In Round 18 of the 2003 NRL season, he made his NRL debut in the Cowboys' 16–22 loss to the Melbourne Storm, starting at fullback. In Round 14 of the 2004 NRL season, he made his second and final NRL appearance, starting at fullback in the Cowboys' 30–6 win over the Newcastle Knights.

In October 2004, Sorbello made his international debut for Italy, starting at fullback and scoring a try in their 58–14 win over Greece.

In 2005, he joined the Wynnum Manly Seagulls in the Queensland Cup, playing two seasons for them before joining the Souths Logan Magpies in 2007. Due to Souths Logan being a Canberra Raiders feeder club at the time, Sorbello played a trial match for the Raiders in the 2007 pre-season, scoring a try in their 28–10 win over the North Queensland Young Guns. He retired from the Queensland Cup at the end of the 2008 season.

== Statistics ==
=== NRL ===
Statistics are correct to the end of the 2004 season

Season	Team	Matches	T	G	GK %	F/G	Pts
2003	North Queensland	1	0	0	—	0	0
2004	North Queensland	1	0	0	—	0	0
Career totals		2	0	0	—	0	0

=== International ===
Season	Team	Matches	T	G	GK %	F/G	Pts
2004	Italy	1	0	0	—	0	0
Career totals		1	1	0	—	0	4
