= Jason Barsley =

Australian rugby league footballer

Personal information
- Born: 10 March 1978 (age 47) Brisbane, Queensland, Australia
- Height: 172 cm (5 ft 8 in)
- Weight: 76 kg (12 st 0 lb)

Playing information
- Position: Centre, Wing
Club
Years	Team	Pld	T	G	FG	P
2003–05	North Qld Cowboys	4	2	0	0	8
- Source: As of 3 November 2018

Jason Barsley (born 10 March 1978) is an Australian former rugby league footballer who played for the North Queensland Cowboys in the National Rugby League. He primarily played at centre and on the wing.

== Playing career ==
Born in Brisbane, Queensland, Barsley played his junior rugby league for the Mareeba Gladiators before playing for the Cairns Cyclones and Central Comets in the Queensland Cup. He joined the North Queensland Cowboys for the 2003 season.

In Round 13 of the 2003 NRL season, he made his NRL debut in the Cowboys' 24–28 golden point loss to the Penrith Panthers, scoring a try. He added two more NRL games for the Cowboys in his debut season, spending the majority of the season playing for the North Queensland Young Guns in the Queensland Cup.

In 2004, Barsley joined the Easts Tigers. He enjoyed a successful season in the Queensland Cup, starting at fullback in Easts' Grand Final loss to the Burleigh Bears, being named the club's Player of the Year and being selected for the Queensland Residents side.

Barsley returned to the Cowboys in 2005, spending the majority of the year playing for the North Queensland Young Guns in the Queensland Cup. He played one NRL game in 2005, scoring the Cowboys' only try in a 4–34 loss to the St George Illawarra Dragons. After another season with the Young Guns in 2006, Barsley was released by the club.

== Statistics ==
=== NRL ===
Statistics are correct to the end of the 2005 season

Season	Team	Matches	T	G	GK %	F/G	Pts
2003	North Queensland	3	1	0	—	0	4
2005	North Queensland	1	1	0	—	0	4
Career totals		4	2	0	—	0	8
