= Simon Phillips (rugby league) =

Australian rugby league footballer

Personal information
- Born: 20 June 1983 (age 42); Brisbane, Queensland, Australia
- Height: 178 cm (5 ft 10 in)
- Weight: 85 kg (13 st 5 lb)

Playing information
- Position: Wing, Centre
Club
Years	Team	Pld	T	G	FG	P
2002	North Qld Cowboys	4	1	0	0	4
2015	Coventry Bears	15	2	0	0	8
	Total	19	3	0	0	12
Representative
Years	Team	Pld	T	G	FG	P
2006	Queensland Residents	1	1	0	0	4
- Source: As of 8 January 2024

Simon Phillips (born 20 June 1983) is an Australian former professional rugby league footballer who played for the North Queensland Cowboys in the National Rugby League and Coventry Bears in the League 1. Early in his career he played on the wing and at centre but later moved into the forwards and played lock.

== Playing career ==
A Souths Mackay junior, Phillips joined the North Queensland Cowboys as a teenager. In 2001 and 2002, he represented Queensland under-19, starting on the wing in both games.

In Round 12 of the 2002 NRL season, Phillips made his NRL debut as an 18-year old in the Cowboys' 40–32 win over the St George Illawarra Dragons. A week later, he scored his first NRL try in the Cowboys' 6–34 loss to the New Zealand Warriors. He ended his debut season with one try from four games.

In 2003, Phillips broke his ankle while playing for the North Queensland Young Guns in the Queensland Cup. He was released by the club at the end of the season.

In 2004, he joined the Wynnum Manly Seagulls and spent six years at the club. During that time he played over 100 games for the club, was selected for the Queensland Residents in 2006 and was named their Player of the Year in 2007. He retired at the end of the 2009 season but returned three years later, joining the Norths Devils.

In December 2014, Phillips signed with the Coventry Bears for their first professional season in League 1. In February 2015, he was named captain of the side for 2015 season. He retired at the end of the 2015 season.

== Statistics ==
=== NRL ===
Statistics are correct to the end of the 2002 season

Season	Team	Matches	T	G	GK %	F/G	Pts
2002	North Queensland	4	1	0	—	0	4
Career totals		4	1	0	—	0	4

=== League 1 ===
Season	Team	Matches	T	G	GK %	F/G	Pts
2015	Coventry	15	2	0	—	0	8
Career totals		15	2	0	—	0	8
