= David Myles (rugby league) =

US international rugby league footballer

Personal information
- Born: 7 February 1978 (age 48) Brisbane, Queensland, Australia

Playing information
- Height: 188 cm (6 ft 2 in)
- Weight: 93 kg (14 st 9 lb)
- Position: Fullback, Wing, Centre, Five-eighth
Club
Years	Team	Pld	T	G	FG	P
1998	Gold Coast Chargers	17	10	0	0	20
2000–02	New Zealand Warriors	41	17	0	0	48
2003–05	North Qld Cowboys	57	18	1	0	74
2006	Toulouse Olympique	5	5	0	0	0
2007	Gold Coast Titans	4	0	0	0	0
	Total	124	50	1	0	142
Representative
Years	Team	Pld	T	G	FG	P
2007–08	United States	3	3	0	0	12

David Myles (born 7 February 1978 in Brisbane, Queensland, Australia) is a former professional rugby league footballer who played in the 1990s and 2000s. He played for the North Queensland Cowboys, Auckland Warriors and the Gold Coast Chargers in first grade. He also played for the United States national rugby league team.

== Playing career ==
Myles started his career with the South Queensland Crushers but could not break into first grade. In 1998 he moved to join the Gold Coast Chargers and made his first grade debut on 5 April against the Brisbane Broncos. He won Rookie of the year in 1998. The Chargers folded at the end of the year and he spent 1999 with the Cronulla Sharks, spending a lot of the year in the NSWRL Premier League.

In 2000 he moved again, signing with the then Auckland Warriors. He received the Best Back award for 2000 and he played with the club for three seasons and played in 51 matches. He was an integral part of the club's first finals appearance in 2001. At the end of the 2002 season he moved again, signing with the North Queensland Cowboys. He played in 57 matches for the Cowboys, scoring 18 tries. He played his 100th first grade game during his time at the Cowboys. He also did not miss a game while at the club which showed his toughness and passion for the club. He played a very large role in the club's first finals appearance and also scored the only try in the Cowboys first finals appearance in Townsville beating big brothers Brisbane Broncos for the first time in the club's history.

Myles spent the 2006 season with Toulouse Olympique in France.

He then signed with the new Gold Coast Titans franchise in 2007. However he spent most of the season with the Tweed Heads Seagulls in the Queensland Cup, playing only four first grade matches for the Titans. Tweed Seagulls won the QLD Cup Grand Final that season with Myles scoring two tries. Myles also represented the United States in a 2007 World Cup qualifying match in which he scored a try. He retired playing professionally at the end of 2007 however still played with The USA national team which qualified for the 2013 World Cup. He scored a try in games against South Africa as well as Jamaica on the way to qualifying.

== Post playing ==
On 18 February 2026, Myles was announced as the Chairman of the Football Board for the North Queensland Cowboys.
