= Scott Bolton (rugby league) =

Australian rugby league footballer

Personal information
- Full name: Scott Bolton
- Born: 9 May 1987 (age 39) Innisfail, Queensland, Australia
- Height: 187 cm (6 ft 2 in)
- Weight: 112 kg (17 st 9 lb)

Playing information
- Position: Prop, Second-row
Club
Years	Team	Pld	T	G	FG	P
2007–19	North Qld Cowboys	246	19	1	0	78
Representative
Years	Team	Pld	T	G	FG	P
2006–08	Queensland Residents	2	0	0	0	0
- Source: As of 4 January 2024

Scott Bolton (born 9 May 1987) is an Australian former professional rugby league footballer who played as a prop or second-row forward for the North Queensland Cowboys in the NRL.

Bolton has played his entire career with the North Queensland Cowboys, playing in their 2015 NRL Grand Final and 2016 World Club Challenge winning sides.

== Background ==
Bolton was born in Innisfail, Queensland, Australia. He played his junior football for the Innisfail Brothers and attended Innisfail State High School.

== Playing career ==
A talented back rower, Bolton joined the North Queensland Cowboys as a teenager and played for their then Queensland Cup side, the North Queensland Young Guns. He was a member of the Young Guns Premiership-winning side in 2005 at age 18, playing alongside future North Queensland teammates Gavin Cooper and Matthew Scott. Bolton represented the Junior Kangaroos and Queensland under-19 sides in 2005 and 2006. In 2006, he played for the Queensland Residents.

=== 2007 ===
Bolton made his NRL debut in Round 4 of the 2007 NRL season, playing off the interchange bench in North Queensland's 25–24 victory over the Wests Tigers. He would go on to play five more games that season, scoring one try.

=== 2008 ===
Bolton earned his first run on start for the North Queensland club in Round 16 of the 2008 NRL season. He started at second-row in their 29–28 loss to the South Sydney Rabbitohs. Despite this, Bolton only played four NRL games in 2008, spending the majority of the season playing in the Queensland Cup. He would also play for the Queensland Residents for the second time.

=== 2009 ===
In 2009, Bolton became one of the North Queensland clubs rising stars, cementing himself in the team's starting side and playing all 24 games that season. On 7 July 2009, he re-signed with the North Queensland outfit until the end of 2012. He was named North Queensland's Most Improved for 2009 at their end of season awards night.

=== 2010 ===
In 2010, Bolton's good form was recognised by Queensland coach Mal Meninga and he was named in Meninga's 2010 QAS Emerging Origin Squad. Bolton was one of the Cowboys' best players in a disappointing 2010 season, storming into Queensland Origin contention. He set a new record for the most tries in a season scored by a North Queensland forward, with seven, and he started all 24 matches, averaging 109 metres and 30 tackles a match.

In Round 23, Bolton was charged with biting Gold Coast Titans centre Clinton Toopi. Bolton faced the judiciary but was found not guilty after a lack of bite marks were found and Toopi refused to give evidence.

=== 2011 ===
Injuries significantly affected Bolton's 2011 season. He tore his left calf muscle in Round 1 against the Brisbane Broncos. He returned to the North Queensland starting line-up in Round 6 against the Canberra Raiders, scoring a try, but was reverted to the bench when teammate Gavin Cooper returned from suspension the following week. Bolton was named in the starting line-up for the round 15 clash against the New Zealand Warriors. However, injury struck again, a tear to his right calf muscle ruled him out of action until round 21 of the season.

Bolton returned for North Queensland's run to the finals, playing in the side's qualifying final loss to the Manly Warringah Sea Eagles. It was Bolton's first NRL finals game. He finished 2011 with 15 games, averaging 90 metres and 25 tackles a game.

=== 2012 ===
On 17 August 2012, Bolton re-signed with the North Queensland side on a one-year deal, keeping him at the club until the end of the 2013 season. Bolton again struggled with injuries in 2012 but still managed to play 14 games throughout the course of the season.

=== 2013 ===
In Round 17 of the 2013 NRL season, Bolton played his 100th NRL game in North Queensland's 26–18 loss to the Canberra Raiders.

On 5 August 2013, Bolton once again re-signed with the North Queensland side, this time on a two-year deal until the end of 2015.

=== 2014 ===
In 2014, Bolton played every game for the North Queensland club for the third time in his career, mostly coming off the interchange. in what was his first season since 2010 in which Bolton did not encounter extended time on the sidelines due to injury, he returned to the form that had him shot for an Origin debut, averaging close to 100 metres a game in his 26 games of the interchange bench.

=== 2015 ===
In 2015, Bolton played the first 8 games of the season before a fishing injury ruled him out for up to 3 months. While fishing during North Queensland's bye weekend, Bolton sliced his finger open while preparing bait. The forward underwent surgery, having to have the tendon in his finger reattached. Bolton returned in Round 17 and on 4 October 2015, was a member of North Queensland's Grand Final winning side, coming off the bench in the side's 17–16 victory over the Brisbane Broncos.

=== 2016 ===
On 21 February 2016, Bolton was a member of the Cowboys' World Club Challenge winning side, coming off the bench in the side's 38–4 victory over the Leeds Rhinos at Headingley Stadium. On 5 May he was named on the bench in the QRL's greatest Queensland Residents team of all time by journalist Tony Webeck.

Bolton played every game for the North Queensland outfit in 2016, for the fourth time in his career. His 27 games were the most he has played in a season.

=== 2017 ===
After the loss of James Tamou, Bolton became one of North Queensland's starting props alongside Matthew Scott. When Scott suffered a season-ending injury in Round 2, he was left as the club's most experienced front rower. On 8 June, he re-signed with North Queensland until the end of the 2019 season. In Round 24 of the 2017 NRL season, he played his 200th NRL game.

On 1 October, he started at prop in North Queensland's 2017 NRL Grand Final loss to the Melbourne Storm. He played every game for the club in 2017, starting at prop in all 28 games. On 6 October, he was named the Cowboys' Club Person of the Year and also became the eighth life member of the club.

=== 2018 ===
Bolton started the season playing off the interchange but soon returned to the starting lineup after Jordan McLean was ruled out for three months with a foot injury. A rib cartilage injury suffered in a Round 12 loss to Melbourne saw him miss two games. Bolton finished the 2018 season having played 22 games, starting 13 of them.

=== 2019 ===
Bolton played his first game of the season in North Queensland's Round 6 win over the Warriors, after serving a five-game suspension. On 27 August, North Queensland announced that Bolton would be leaving the club at the end of the season. In his final home game for the Cowboys, Bolton kicked the first goal of his career in a 15–8 win over the Canterbury Bulldogs. A week later, he played his final game for the club, starting at prop in a 24–16 loss to the Melbourne Storm.

== Achievements and accolades ==
=== Individual ===
- North Queensland Cowboys Club Person of the Year: 2017
- North Queensland Cowboys Most Improved: 2009

=== Team ===
- 2015 NRL Grand Final: North Queensland Cowboys – Winners
- 2016 World Club Challenge: North Queensland Cowboys – Winners

== Statistics ==
=== NRL ===
Statistics are correct to the end of the 2019 season

†	Denotes seasons in which Bolton won an NRL Premiership

Season	Team	Matches	T	G	GK %	F/G	Pts
2007	North Queensland	6	1	0	—	0	4
2008	North Queensland	4	0	0	—	0	0
2009	North Queensland	24	3	0	—	0	12
2010	North Queensland	24	7	0	—	0	28
2011	North Queensland	15	1	0	—	0	4
2012	North Queensland	14	1	0	—	0	4
2013	North Queensland	18	0	0	—	0	0
2014	North Queensland	26	0	0	—	0	0
2015†	North Queensland	20	2	0	—	0	8
2016	North Queensland	27	2	0	—	0	0
2017	North Queensland	28	2	0	—	0	8
2018	North Queensland	22	0	0	—	0	0
2019	North Queensland	18	0	1	100%	0	0
Career totals		246	19	1	100%	0	78

== Personal life ==
Bolton married his wife, Michelle, in October 2016.

=== Assault charge ===
On 7 May 2018, Bolton was arrested and charged in Bondi for indecent assault. On 7 August 2018, he pled not guilty to the charge. On 7 January 2019, he pled guilty to a lesser charge of common assault after allegations were withdrawn and was handed a 12-month good behaviour bond.
