= Glenn Morrison (rugby league) =

Australian RL coach and former professional rugby league footballer

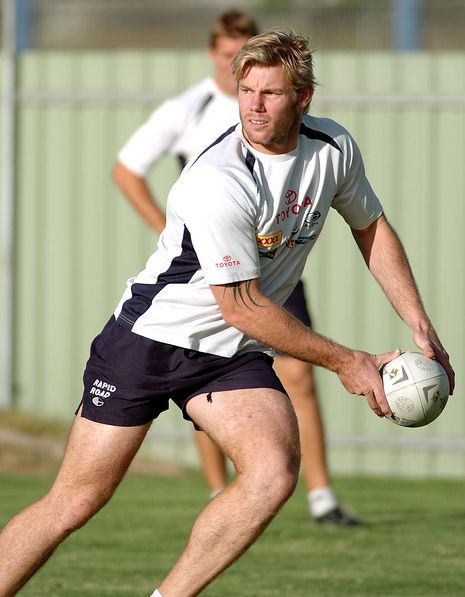

Personal information
- Born: 28 May 1976 (age 50) Canterbury, New South Wales, Australia

Playing information
- Height: 1.86 m (6 ft 1 in)
- Weight: 102 kg (16 st 1 lb)
- Position: Second-row, Lock, Five-eighth
Club
Years	Team	Pld	T	G	FG	P
1996–97	Balmain Tigers	41	7	0	0	28
1998–99	North Sydney Bears	42	9	0	0	36
2000–04	North Qld Cowboys	94	32	20	0	168
2005–06	Parramatta Eels	45	15	0	0	60
2007–09	Bradford Bulls	56	23	0	0	92
2010–11	Wakefield Trinity Wildcats	46	10	0	0	40
	Total	324	96	20	0	424
Representative
Years	Team	Pld	T	G	FG	P
2001–05	NSW Country	4	0	0	0	0
2011	Exiles	1	0	0	0	0

Coaching information
Club
Years	Team	Gms	W	D	L	W%
2012–17	Dewsbury Rams	138	68	1	70	49
2021	Cleveland Rugby League
	Total	138	68	1	70	49
Representative
Years	Team	Gms	W	D	L	W%
2017	Jamaica	1	0	0	1	0

Glenn Adam Morrison (born 28 May 1976), is an Australian former professional rugby league footballer and coach. He played for the Parramatta Eels, the Balmain Tigers, the North Sydney Bears and the North Queensland Cowboys in the National Rugby League before moving to England to play for the Bradford Bulls and then the Wakefield Trinity Wildcats (captain). He was later the head coach of the Dewsbury Rams. In 2021, Morrison was appointed Head coach of Cleveland Rugby League, in the newly created North American Rugby League.

== Playing career ==
=== Early career ===
Morrison began playing junior football for the Terrigal Sharks in the Central Coast Rugby League.

=== Balmain Tigers ===
Morrison started his career with Balmain in 1996, where he played 21 times in his début season, scoring 4 tries. He went on to play another 20 times in 1997, scoring 3 tries, before he left Balmain for the North Sydney Bears.

=== North Sydney Bears ===
Morrison signed a two-year deal with the North Sydney Bears in 1998 where he played 42 times scoring 9 tries. He had his most successful season in 1999 when he scored 24 points in 20 games. Morrison was a member of The North Sydney side when they played their final ever game in first grade against the North Queensland Cowboys in Townsville ending 91 years of playing in the top grade.

=== North Queensland Cowboys ===
Morrison was on the move again when he signed for North Queensland Cowboys in 2000. In 2001, Morrison was named the Cowboys' player of the year when he scored 13 tries is 23 games. He had his most successful spell at the Cowboys scoring 168 points in 94 games. He scored 60 points in 2002 playing only 15 times.

Morrison was selected for Country Origin in 2001, 2003, 2004, and 2005.

=== Parramatta Eels ===
Morrison left the Cowboys in 2004 to join Parramatta in 2005 where he spent 2 seasons scoring 60 points in 45 games. In 2005, Morrison was part of the Parramatta side which won the minor premiership but lost 29–0 in the preliminary final against North Queensland. 2006 was his final season in the NRL before he left for the Super League.

=== Bradford Bulls ===
In January 2007, Morrison signed a three-year deal with the Bradford Bulls, where head coach Steve McNamara appointed Morrison as vice-captain. That same year, Morrison made the Super League Dream Team. Morrison also won the T&A Player of the Year as well as the coaches' award, Players' Player of the Year and Supporters' Player of the Year titles in 2007. In 2008, Morrison made 733 tackles, the sixth highest in the entire competition.

=== Wakefield Trinity ===
After three years with the Bradford Bulls, Morrison signed with the Wakefield Trinity Wildcats for the 2010 season. After a successful first season at Wakefield, he signed for a further season in 2011.

In June 2011, Morrison was selected as a reserve in the inaugural England vs Exiles Origin match, at Headingley. He was promoted to the interchange bench after Warrington centre Matt King dropped out for personal reasons, and played for a large part of the game. Despite missing out on the Man of the Match trophy (picked up by Castleford Tigers stand off Rangi Chase), Morrison's performance was picked out as being amongst the best on the night.

On 11 November 2011, Morrison announced his immediate retirement from the game, acting on advice from health professionals, due to a serious shoulder injury. He remained at the Wakefield Trinity Wildcats, in the capacity of assistant coach. He played 46 times for Wakefield, scoring 10 tries during his two-year spell at the club.

=== Bradford Salem ===
Glenn Morrison crossed codes for a 2019 charity game in the Richard Birkett memorial game playing on behalf of Bradford Salem.

Following his charity run out; Glenn signed for Salem to play through the 2019 winter season, debuting at fly half in the opening preseason game against Yarnbury XV.

== Coaching career ==
On 5 September 2012, it was announced Morrison was leaving Wakefield to take up the position of head coach for two years at the Dewsbury Rams.

During the 2014 pre-season Morrison was reported by The New Zealand Herald as being short-listed for the Kiwis coaching job.

After a run of defeats during the early stages of the 2017 championship season, Morrison announced he would be stepping down as head coach at Dewsbury Rams on 27 March after a near five-year tenure . As of 2018, Morrison is a rugby coach at Bradford Grammar School.

Glenn coached the Jamaica national team for one fixture in the 34–12 defeat to France in Perpignan on 13 Oct 2017.

On 19 April 2021 it was announced that he had been appointed as Director of Rugby at Cleveland Rugby League in the new North American Rugby League.

== Statistics ==
=== Club career ===
Year	Club	Apps	Pts	T	G	FG
1996	Balmain Tigers	21	16	4	-	-
1997	Balmain Tigers	20	12	3	-	-
1998	North Sydney Bears	22	12	3	-	-
1999	North Sydney Bears	20	24	6	-	-
2000	North Queensland Cowboys	20	4	1	-	-
2001	North Queensland Cowboys	23	52	13	-	-
2002	North Queensland Cowboys	15	60	7	16	-
2003	North Queensland Cowboys	22	36	7	4	-
2004	North Queensland Cowboys	14	16	4	-	-
2005	Parramatta Eels	22	36	9	-	-
2006	Parramatta Eels	23	24	6	-	-
2007	Bradford Bulls	28	44	11	-	-
2008	Bradford Bulls	13	24	6	–	–
2009	Bradford Bulls	15	12	3	–	–
2010	Wakefield Trinity Wildcats	23	28	7	–	–
2011	Wakefield Trinity Wildcats	23	12	3	–	–
