= Paul McNicholas (rugby league) =

Ireland international rugby league footballer

Personal information
- Full name: Paul McNicholas
- Born: 26 May 1975 (age 51) Sydney, New South Wales, Australia

Playing information
- Height: 199 cm (6 ft 6 in)
- Weight: 119 kg (18 st 10 lb)
- Position: Second-row, Prop
Club
Years	Team	Pld	T	G	FG	P
1996–99	South Sydney	26	0	0	0	0
2000–01	Cronulla Sharks	30	1	0	0	4
2002	South Sydney	8	0	0	0	0
2003	North Qld Cowboys	7	1	0	0	4
2004–05	Hull F.C.	44	4	0	0	16
	Total	115	6	0	0	24
Representative
Years	Team	Pld	T	G	FG	P
2005–06	Ireland	3	0	0	0	0

Paul McNicholas (born 26 May 1975) is a former professional rugby league footballer who played in the 1990s and 2000s. He played at representative level for Ireland, and at club level for South Sydney Rabbitohs (two spells), Cronulla-Sutherland Sharks, North Queensland Cowboys, and Hull F.C., as a prop, or second-row.

== Background ==
McNicholas was born in Sydney, Australia.

== Playing career ==
McNicholas made his first grade debut for South Sydney in round 1 of the 1996 ARL season against Manly at Brookvale Oval. He played off the bench in Souths 44-6 loss. In the 1999 NRL season, McNicholas played 15 games for South Sydney including what was meant to be their final ever game when they played against Parramatta. Souths lost the match 34-16 and were ejected from the competition ahead of the 2000 NRL season due to not meeting the NRL's controversial criteria. For the 2000 season, McNicholas signed a contract to join Cronulla. In 2001, he played 20 games including Cronulla's preliminary final loss to Newcastle. When South Sydney were re-admitted back to the competition in 2002, McNicholas signed for the club and played in their first game since the readmission which was a 40-6 loss against arch-rivals the Sydney Roosters. In 2003, McNicholas joined North Queensland and featured in eight games. He was the second tallest player In his time with the National Rugby League just behind behemoth Prop Matt Parsons. McNicholas spent the final two years of his career playing for Hull F.C. in the Super League.

== International honors ==
McNicholas won three caps for Ireland in 2005–2006 while at Hull.
