= Ben Vaeau =

Cook Islands international rugby league footballer

Personal information
- Full name: Ben Vaeau
- Born: 7 January 1982 (age 43); Auckland, New Zealand
- Height: 185 cm (6 ft 1 in)
- Weight: 111 kg (17 st 7 lb)

Playing information
- Position: Prop, Second-row
Club
Years	Team	Pld	T	G	FG	P
2006	Brisbane Broncos	1	0	0	0	0
2007–08	North Qld Cowboys	19	1	0	0	4
	Total	20	1	0	0	4
Representative
Years	Team	Pld	T	G	FG	P
2009	Cook Islands	2	0	0	0	0
- As of 23 August 2008

Ben Vaeau (born 7 January 1982) is a professional rugby league footballer who currently plays for Eastern Suburbs Tigers in the Queensland Cup. His position of preference is at prop.

== Playing career ==
Vaeau played for the Manukau Magpies in the 2002 Auckland Rugby League competition.

Vaeau played for the Brisbane Broncos in 2006 and North Queensland Cowboys from 2007 to 2008 in the National Rugby League.

== Representative career ==
Vaeau has represented the Cook Islands and was part of their squad at the 2009 Pacific Cup.

== Statistics ==
=== Club career ===
Year	Team	Matches	Tries	Goals	Field Goals	Points
2006	Brisbane Broncos	1	0	0	0	0
2007	North Queensland	8	0	0	0	0
2008	North Queensland	11	0	0	0	0
