= Micheal Luck =

Australian rugby league footballer

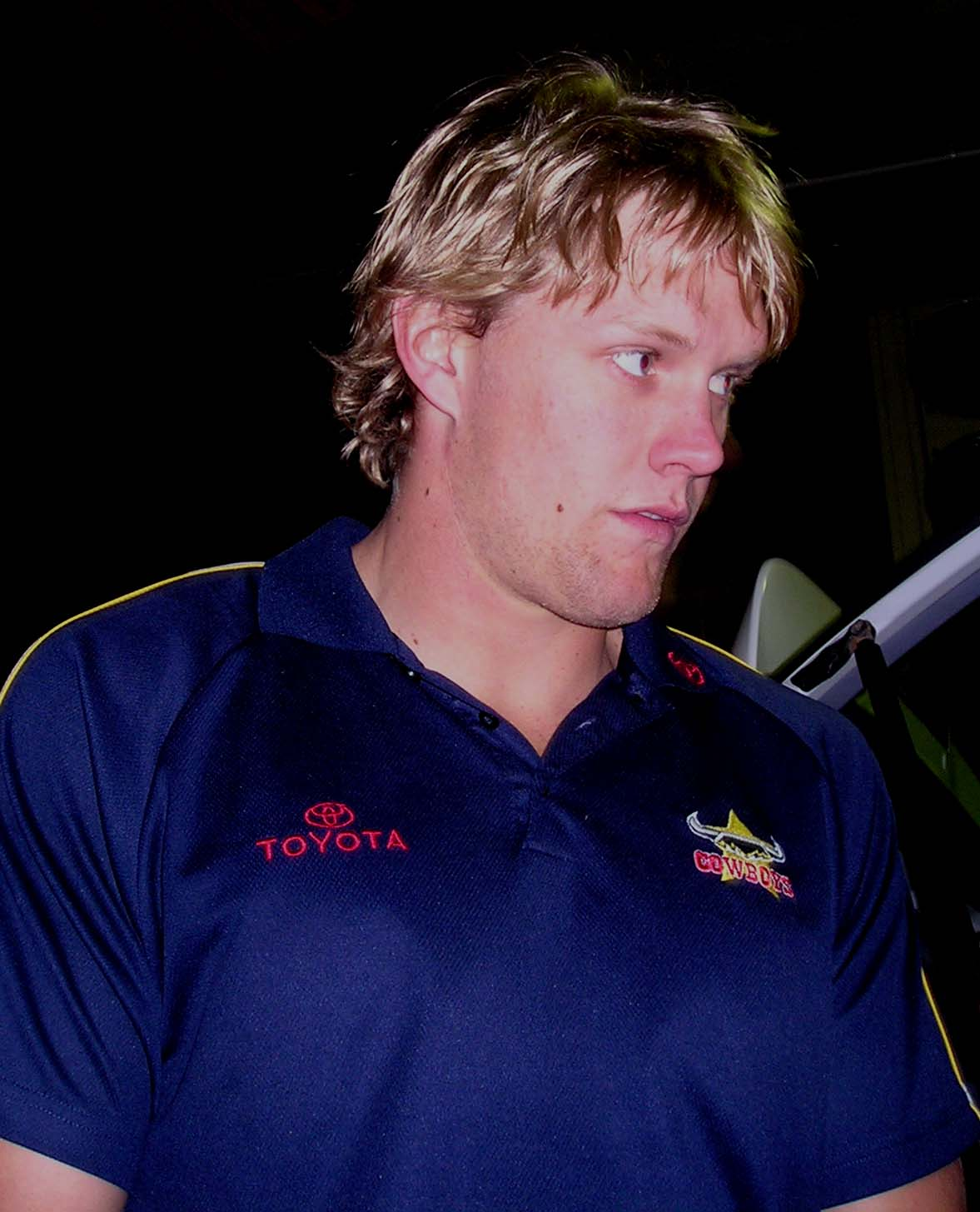

Personal information
- Born: 21 April 1981 (age 45) Gatton, Queensland, Australia

Playing information
- Height: 187 cm (6 ft 2 in)
- Weight: 98 kg (15 st 6 lb)
- Position: Lock, Second-row
Club
Years	Team	Pld	T	G	FG	P
2001–05	North Qld Cowboys	76	5	0	0	20
2006–12	New Zealand Warriors	150	7	0	0	28
	Total	226	12	0	0	48
Representative
Years	Team	Pld	T	G	FG	P
2010	Prime Minister's XIII	1	0	0	0	0

Micheal Luck (born 21 April 1981) is an Australian former professional rugby league footballer who played for the North Queensland Cowboys and the New Zealand Warriors. Luck's position of choice was lock or second-row.

In 2026, Luck was announced as the CEO of the North Queensland Cowboys Football Club, the team he made his professional debut for 25 years earlier.

== Playing career ==
=== Queensland ===
While attending Kirwan State High School, Luck played for the Australian Schoolboys team in 1999. He also attended Townsville Grammar School. His junior club was North Thuringowa.

In 2001, Luck made his National Rugby League debut for the North Queensland Cowboys. He played 76 first grade games for the North Queensland club, mostly from the bench. Luck played nine games for the club during the 2005 NRL season but was not part of the side which reached the 2005 NRL Grand Final against the Wests Tigers.

=== New Zealand ===
At the end of 2005, Luck moved to the New Zealand Warriors, seeking more playing time. In his first season for the club, 2006, Luck managed to play every single NRL game for the Warriors and won the club's Clubman of the Year award. He played over 50 consecutive games for the club and made the most tackles for the club in 2007, again being named Clubman of the Year. In 2007 he was called into the Queensland squad as injury cover but was not required. He was named in Queensland's Emerging Origin side for 2009.

On 25 April 2009, whilst playing against the Melbourne Storm at Olympic Park, Luck made an NRL record-breaking 74 tackles in an extra time draw, 14-all, which was beaten a year later in Round 11 2011 by Shaun Fensom with 75 tackles against Canterbury-Bankstown. The previous record was held by Nathan Hindmarsh of the Parramatta Eels who had 69 tackles in a match in 2007.

At the end of 2009, Luck picked up the Warriors biggest award, the club Player of the Year. Luck claimed the trophy ahead of Manu Vatuvei and Sam Rapira.

In 2010 Luck became the 17th player to play 100 games for the Warriors.

On 14 September 2010, he was selected in the Prime Minister's XIII to play Papua New Guinea on 26 September.

Luck played in the 2011 NRL Grand Final against the Manly-Warringah Sea Eagles which New Zealand lost 24–10.

Luck announced on 21 April 2012 that he would retire at season's end (2012 NRL season).

== Administration career ==
Following retirement, Luck was appointed as the North Queensland Cowboys' elite pathways manager for 2013 and beyond, working to build local junior talent. After a brief stint as HR Manager in 2017, Luck was promoted to COO in 2018 before working as the General Manager of Football from 2021.

On 18 February 2026, the Cowboys announced that Luck had become the club's new CEO of its Football Club.

In 2013 he completed a master's thesis at Auckland University of Technology on drinking culture in rugby players.
