= Ashley Alberts =

Australian rugby league footballer

Personal information
- Born: 4 February 1984 (age 41); Mackay, Queensland, Australia
- Height: 181 cm (5 ft 11 in)
- Weight: 80 kg (12 st 8 lb)

Playing information
- Position: Centre, Wing
Club
| Years | Team | Pld | T | G | FG | P |
|---|---|---|---|---|---|---|
| 2002 | North Qld Cowboys | 5 | 1 | 0 | 0 | 4 |
| 2005 | Manly Sea Eagles | 8 | 2 | 0 | 0 | 8 |
| | Total | 13 | 3 | 0 | 0 | 12 |
- Source: As of 4 November 2018

Ashley Alberts (born 4 February 1984) is an Australian former rugby league footballer who played for the North Queensland Cowboys and Manly Warringah Sea Eagles in the National Rugby League. He primarily played at centre and wing.

== Playing career ==
Born in Mackay, Queensland, Alberts played his junior rugby league for Norths Mackay, Mackay North State High School (where he made under 15 QLD and Australian schoolboy teams) and Norths Rockhampton before being signed by the North Queensland Cowboys. In 2001, while attending Kirwan State High School in his final year, Alberts represented the Australian Schoolboys and Queensland under-17 sides.

In Round 4 of the 2002 NRL season, Alberts made his NRL debut as an 18-year old in the Cowboys' 20–50 loss to the New Zealand Warriors, starting on the wing. He scored his first NRL try in the Cowboys' 20–32 loss to the Canberra Raiders in Round 11. After playing five games for the Cowboys, Alberts signed with the Brisbane Broncos for the 2003 season but was released in December 2002 before even attending a training session.

In 2003, he joined the Central Queensland Comets in the Queensland Cup and represented Queensland under-19 that season. In 2004, Alberts joined the Toowoomba Clydesdales, who were a feeder club for the Brisbane Broncos.

In 2005, Alberts joined the Manly-Warringah Sea Eagles on a two-year deal. He played eight games for the side in 2005 before being granted a release in early 2006, returning to play for the Central Comets in the Queensland Cup.

== Statistics ==
=== NRL ===
Statistics are correct to the end of the 2005 season

| Season | Team | Matches | T | G | GK % | F/G | Pts |
|---|---|---|---|---|---|---|---|
| 2002 | North Queensland | 5 | 1 | 0 | — | 0 | 4 |
| 2005 | Manly | 8 | 2 | 0 | — | 0 | 8 |
| Career totals | | 13 | 3 | 0 | — | 0 | 12 |
