= Gerry Collins (broadcaster) =

Australian sports broadcaster

Gerry Collins is a Brisbane-based sports commentator and writer for ABC Radio Grandstand.

He was born in the Hunter Region of New South Wales, Australia and attended St Brigid's Primary School at Raymond Terrace and Marist Brothers' College in Hamilton before gaining a teaching qualification at Newcastle Teachers' College. His teaching career ultimately took him to Dubbo in western New South Wales.

He joined the Dubbo Ducks amateur swimming team in 1972 and called rugby league games on a part-time basis at 2DU in Dubbo. Ultimately, he left his teaching career to work at the Daily Liberal, rising to sports editor and then editor.

In 1984, he became a sports broadcaster with the ABC, and his major Games swimming coverage began in 1986 with that year's Commonwealth Games in Edinburgh.

A regular caller of rugby league, rugby union and cricket in Brisbane, he has also hosted Grandstand in the past and presented its Queensland segment, and covered three Rugby World Cups, including broadcasting Australia's win in the 1999 final in Wales.

He has been the ABC's swimming commentator at Olympic Games, Commonwealth Games and World Championships since the 1988 Seoul Olympics. He has maintained his participation in amateur competitive swimming.

In November 2010, Collins announced that he would retire from ABC Grandstand and move back to his hometown of Newcastle, he joined the ABC in 1984.
