= Greg Byrnes =

Australian rugby league player

Personal information
- Born: Atherton, Queensland, Australia

Playing information
- Height: 189 cm (6 ft 2 in)
- Weight: 104 kg (16 st 5 lb)
- Position: Prop
Club
Years	Team	Pld	T	G	FG	P
2008	North Queensland Cowboys	3	0	0	0	0

Greg Byrnes is an Australian former professional rugby league footballer. He last played for the Northern Pride in the Queensland Cup. He previously played for the North Queensland Cowboys in the NRL.

== Playing career ==
Byrnes made his debut for the North Queensland side in round 15 of the 2008 NRL season against Melbourne.

== Statistics ==
=== Club career ===
Year	Team	Matches	Tries	Goals	Field Goals	Points
2008	North Queensland	3	0	0	0	0
