= Tarin Bradford =

Australian rugby league footballer

Personal information
- Born: 22 May 1980 (age 44); Ayr, Queensland, Australia
- Height: 180 cm (5 ft 11 in)
- Weight: 84 kg (13 st 3 lb)

Playing information
- Position: Wing
Club
Years	Team	Pld	T	G	FG	P
2001–02	North Qld Cowboys	5	2	0	0	8
- Source: As of 4 November 2018

Tarin Bradford (born 22 May 1980) is an Australian former rugby league footballer who played for the North Queensland Cowboys in the National Rugby League. He primarily played on the wing.

== Playing career ==
A Burdekin Roosters junior, Bradford joined the North Queensland Cowboys in 2001.

In round 4 of the 2001 NRL season, he made his first grade debut in North Queensland's 18–32 loss to the Penrith Panthers. He played just one more game in 2001 and three in 2002, scoring two tries. In May 2002, Bradford was granted a release from the club, citing personal problems. He later returned to play for the Burdekin Roosters A-Grade side.

== Statistics ==
=== NRL ===
Statistics are correct to the end of the 2002 season

Season	Team	Matches	T	G	GK %	F/G	Pts
2001	North Queensland	2	0	0	—	0	0
2002	North Queensland	3	2	0	—	0	8
Career totals		5	2	0	—	0	8
