= Derrick Watkins =

Australian rugby league footballer

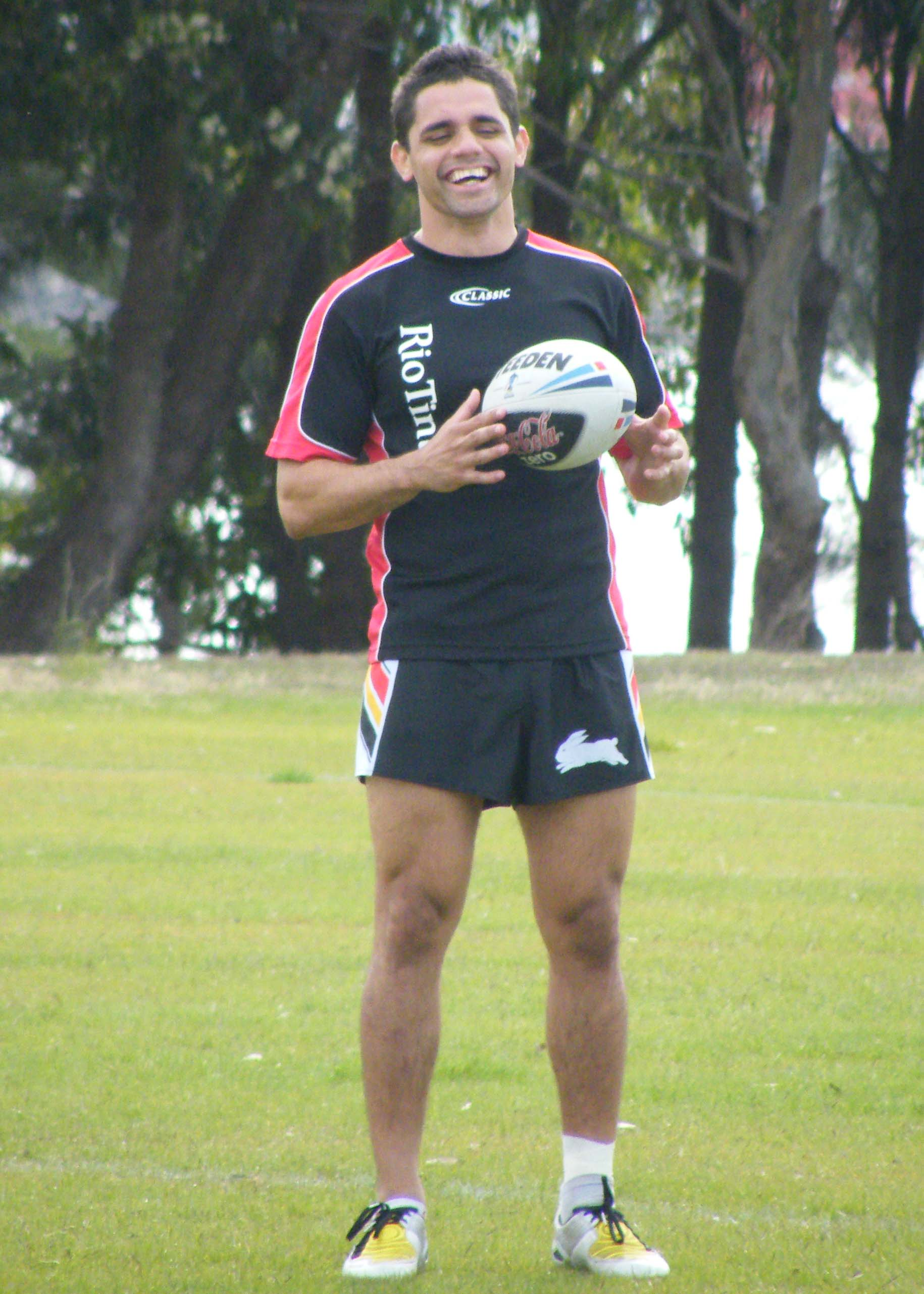

Personal information
- Full name: Derrick Watkins
- Born: 15 March 1983 (age 42) Mount Isa, Queensland, Australia

Playing information
- Height: 180 cm (5 ft 11 in)
- Weight: 90 kg (14 st 2 lb)
- Position: Second-row
Club
Years	Team	Pld	T	G	FG	P
2002–03	North Qld Cowboys	3	0	0	0	0
2008	Brisbane Broncos	4	0	0	0	0
	Total	7	0	0	0	0
Representative
Years	Team	Pld	T	G	FG	P
2008	Indigenous All Stars	1	0	1	0	2

Derrick Watkins (born 15 March 1983) is an Australian former professional rugby league footballer who last played for the Redcliffe Dolphins in the Queensland Rugby League.

He previously played for the North Queensland Cowboys and the Brisbane Broncos in the National Rugby League (NRL).

== Background ==
Watkins was born in Mount Isa, Queensland, Australia.

== Playing career ==
Watkins made his first-grade debut for North Queensland in round 19 of the 2002 season against Canberra. In 2008, he joined Brisbane and played four games for the club. His final first-grade career ended with a 24–20 loss to St. George in round 23 of the 2008 NRL season. Watkins was eligible to represent Wales and Australia.
