= Jackson Nicolau =

Australian Rugby league footballer (born 1987)

Personal information
- Born: 19 July 1987 (age 39) Mount Isa, Queensland, Australia

Playing information
- Height: 187 cm (6 ft 2 in)
- Weight: 90 kg (14 st 2 lb)
- Position: Five-eighth, Fullback
Club
Years	Team	Pld	T	G	FG	P
2007–08	North Qld Cowboys	2	0	0	0	0
Representative
Years	Team	Pld	T	G	FG	P
2006	Queensland Residents	1	0	0	0	0

Jackson Nicolau (born 19 July 1987) is an Australian former professional Rugby league footballer who played for the North Queensland Cowboys in the NRL.

== Background ==
He was born in the North Queensland town of Mount Isa, Queensland]. He primarily played in the five eighth position and played for Brisbane's Norths Devils in the Queensland Cup in 2006. He was groomed as the replacement for Scott Hill at Melbourne before deciding to return home and sign with the North Queensland Cowboys.

== Playing career ==
Nicolau debuted for North Queensland in round 3 of the 2007 NRL season coming off the bench against the St. George Illawarra Dragons.

Nicolau joined the Gold Coast Titans in the 2009 season. He semi-retired in 2010 and began playing for the Tugun Seahawks in the Gold Coast local competition.
