= Chris Muckert =

Australian rugby league footballer

Personal information
- Full name: Christopher Muckert
- Born: 24 January 1981 (age 44); Queensland
- Height: 186 cm (6 ft 1 in)
- Weight: 103 kg (16 st 3 lb)

Playing information
- Position: Second-row, Lock
Club
Years	Team	Pld	T	G	FG	P
2001–03	North Qld Cowboys	46	6	0	0	24
2004	Parramatta Eels	4	1	0	0	4
	Total	50	7	0	0	28

Chris Muckert (born 24 January 1981) is an Australian former professional rugby league footballer who played as a second-row and lock for the Parramatta Eels and the North Queensland Cowboys in the 2000s.

== Playing career ==
Muckert made his first grade debut for North Queensland in round 7 of the 2001 NRL season against St. George. In 2004, Muckert moved to Parramatta but only managed to make four appearances for the club before being released at the end of the season. In 2006, he signed for the Brisbane Broncos feeder club Toowoomba Clydesdales in the QLD Cup.
