= 2010 Northern Pride RLFC season =

Northern Pride
Club information
- Full name: Northern Pride Rugby League Football Club
- Nickname: The Pride
- Colours: Teal, Gold
- Founded: 2007
- Website: northernpride.com.au

Current details
- Ground: Barlow Park, Cairns (seating 1,700, standing 15,000)
- CEO: John Moore (2010)
- Coach: David Maiden (2010-2012)
- Captain: Chris Sheppard (2008-2010)
- Competition: Intrust Super Cup
- 2010: 4th
Home colours

Away colours

Records
- Premierships: 2 (2010, 2014)
- Runners-up: 1 (2009)
- Minor premierships: 3 (2013, 2014, 2024)

2010 was the third competitive season for the Cairns based Skill360 Northern Pride Rugby League Football Club'. They were one of 12 Australian clubs that played in the fifteenth season of Queensland's top rugby league competition, QRL's Intrust Super Cup, with each team playing 11 home games and 11 away games over 25 weeks between March and August.

The CEO, Denis Keeffe left the Pride to become CEO of the Central Queensland NRL bid. He was replaced by board member and former QRL Northern Division chairman, John Moore. Another board member, Nigel Tillett resigned to concentrate on his CDRL commitments.

Pride assistant coach David Maiden was appointed head coach, replacing Andrew Dunemann who had taken up a new role assistant coach at the NRL's Newcastle Knights. Maiden had coached the Pride's Mal Meninga Cup U-18 side to the grand final last season.

Chris Sheppard was named captain for the third (and final) year, with Ryan Stig taking on the role for the Pre-season Trial against the Windsor Wolves, and Mark Cantoni stepping in as captain between Round 8 and Round 12 when Sheppard was out with a facial fracture.

On 1 April 2010 the Pride launched a Facebook page, 'northernpriderugbyleague', and from Round 3 they started posting live score updates during matches. At away games various staff members and the coaches' wife Juanita Maiden posted scores. At home games Cairns Post sports journalist Andrew Piva posted scores.

The Pride's main sponsor, CRGT (Cairns Region Group Training), became Skill360. CRGT/Skill360 were the Pride's main sponsors for the Pride's first six years. Skytrans Airline sponsored the Pride's 'Take Pride' youth community program.

The Pride played most of their home games at Barlow Park this season, but during May the ground was unavailable while the athletics track was replaced. The Pride played their two May home games at Pride Oval, Irene Street, Manunda, winning both of them.

Rugby League Magazine tipped the Pride to win the competition this year, but the start of the season under their new coach did not go well. Round 1 was a rematch with the Sunshine Coast Sea Eagles, who had beaten the Pride in last year's grand final. Although the Pride had the home game advantage and a new, bulkier front row, and the Sea Eagles had lost many of last year's grand final players, the Pride lost the match. The Pride went on to lose Round 2 to Wynnum Manly, and suffer their greatest defeat, 60-12 in Round 3 to Souths Logan, putting them at the bottom of the table for the first time in their history. In Round 12 Daly Cherry-Evans's Sea Eagles defeated the Pride again, with a humiliating 64-0 defeat.

After thirteen rounds they had only had five wins, but then, in the latter half of the season they won nine consecutive matches to finish in fourth place. The final match of the regular season saw the Pride beat Burleigh Bears 54-6, their biggest win. This game was also the first time the Pride fielded a team without any North Queensland Cowboys.

The Pride had the home game advantage in week one of the finals, when they faced Wynnum Manly. The Pride had lost both regular season games to the WM Seagulls, but this time they beat them 28-12, before going on to beat the minor-premiers, Souths Logan, who had handed them the humiliating defeat in Round 3. Now in their second consecutive Grand Final, the Pride beat Norths Devils 30–20 at Suncorp Stadium to become Premiers for the first time. Captain Chris Sheppard won the Duncan Hall Medal for his man-of-the-match performance in the Grand Final, which was his last game before retirement.

== 2010 Season – Skill360 Northern Pride ==
- Competition: Intrust Super Cup
- Sponsor: Skill360

=== Staff ===
==== Coaches/Trainers ====
- Coach: David Maiden
- Assistant coach: David Westley
- Mal Meninga Cup U-18s coach: Cameron 'Spilla' Miller
- Cyril Connell Cup U-16s coach:
- Strength and conditioning coach: Scott Callaghan
- Strapper: Kev Anderson

==== Captains ====
- Chris Sheppard
- Ryan Stig (Pre-season Trial 4)
- Mark Cantoni (Rounds 8 to 12)

==== Managers ====
- Operations manager: Chris Sheppard
- Team manager: Rob White
- Office Manager: Sheron McDougall
- Club captain: Ben Laity
- Chief executive: John Moore.
- Chairman: Bob Fowler
- Board of Directors: Nigel Tillett, Craig Meiklejohn, Bob Fowler.

== 2010 squad ==
The Pride used 36 players this season. Sixteen players from last year signed with the club again, and seven of the Cowboys allocation players from last year were assigned to the Pride again this year. Thirteen new players made their debut this season; ten were new signings (Aisea Namoa, Ben Fitzpatrick, Ben Spina, Brenton Bowen, Jaiman Lowe, Jay Aston, Mark Dalle Cort, Ryan Stig, Taputoa Sonny Rea and Theeran Pearson), and three were new Cowboys allocation players (Dane Hogan, Kaine Manihera and Michael Bani).

Chris Sheppard (c)
Aisea Namoa
Alex Starmer
Ben Fitzpatrick
Ben Laity
Ben Spina
Brenton Bowen
Brett Anderson
Chey Bird
Chris Riesen
Drew Campbell
Jaiman Lowe
Jamie Frizzo

Jason Roos
Jay Aston
Joel Riethmuller
Mark Cantoni
Mark Dalle Cort
Noel Underwood
Quincy To'oto'o-ulugia
Rod Griffin
Rod Jensen
Ryan Stig
Taputoa Sonny Rea
Theeran Pearson

Trial

Darryl Grant
Freddie Fauid
Nick Obodin
Nigel Naawi
Siaosi Liumaunu

North Queensland Cowboys allocation

Carl Webb*
Clint Amos*
Dane Hogan*
James Tamou*
John Williams*
Kaine Manihera*
Manase Manuokafoa*
Michael Bani*
Nick Slyney*
Steve Southern*
Ty Williams*

Cowboys NYC U-20s
Aidan Day
James Segeyaro

=== 2010 player gains ===
Player	From League	From Club	Notes
Ryan Stig	NRL Telstra Premiership	Newcastle Knights	
Brett Anderson	NRL Telstra Premiership	Melbourne Storm	
Brenton Bowen	NRL Telstra Premiership	Gold Coast Titans	
Theeran Pearson	NRL U-20s	NYC Newcastle Knights	
Jay Aston	Intrust Super Cup	Norths Devils	
Mark Dalle Cort	English RFL Super League	Celtic Crusaders	In August 2009, Dalle Cort, along with five teammates, was ordered to leave the United Kingdom after the UK Border Agency identified breaches to their visa conditions. The Celtic Crusaders cancelled Dalle Cort's contract with immediate effect.
Ben Fitzpatrick	CDRL	Brothers (Cairns)	
Freddie Fauid	CDRL	Brothers (Cairns)	
Nick Obodin	CDRL	Brothers (Cairns)	
Taputoa Sonny Rea	CDRL	Kangaroos RLFC	
Ben Spina	TDRL	Herbert River Crushers	
Aisea Namoa	NZ rugby union	North Otago	
Jaiman Lowe	NRL Telstra Premiership	South Sydney Rabbitohs	Released mid-season after Lowe re-signed with the Rabbitohs after Ben Ross's season ending neck injury).

=== Player losses after 2009 season ===
Player	To League	To Club
Tom Humble	NRL Telstra Premiership	Parramatta Eels
Luke Harlen	NRL Telstra Premiership	Cronulla-Sutherland Sharks
Germaine Paulson	Intrust Cup	Burleigh Bears
Greg Byrnes	Queensland Cup	Redcliffe Dolphins
Richie Marsters	CDRL	Tully Tigers
Gordon Rattler	MDRL	Souths Sharks
Rod Jensen	Retired	Jensen returned to the Pride in Round 15, 2010.
Hezron Murgha	Injured	Out for the year for knee surgery,
Adam Mills	Released	
Callan Myles	Released	
Josh Vaughan	Released	
Luke Millwood	Released	
Chris Riesen		

==== Cowboys no longer allocated to the Pride ====
Player	To League	To Club
Brandon Boor*		
David Pangai*		
Travis Burns*	NRL Telstra Premiership	Penrith Panthers
Matthew Bartlett*	Newcastle Rugby League	Lakes United Seagulls

==== Players suspended ====
Quincy To'oto'o-ulugia was suspended for six-months and fined $2500 after pleading guilty to public nuisance.

=== 2010 season launch ===
- Pre-Season Training: 23 November 2009.
- Pre-Season Boot Camp: Undara, 23–24 January 2010.
- Season Launch: 6 March 2010, 9.00am-11.00am, Airfirst, 124 Anderson Street, Manunda.

=== 2010 player awards ===
- Cairns Post most improved player: Noel Underwood
- Cairns Colonial Club Resort best back: Brett Anderson
- Taxsmart best forward: Mark Cantoni
- Skytrans players' player: Ben Laity
- QCCU John O'Brien Perpetual Club Person of the Year: Cameron 'Spiller' Miller
- Skill360 Australia player of the year: Joel Riethmuller
- Duncan Hall Medal Winner: Chris Sheppard

==== Grand Final Premiers Presentation ====
- 21 September 2010, 4.00pm at the Cairns Esplanade. Cairns Regional Council Mayor Val Schier presented the team with a commemorative plaque.

==== 2010 Queensland Residents team ====
Clint Amos*

==== Players signed to first-tier teams ====
Player	To League	To Club
Ryan Stig	NRL Telstra Premiership	Newcastle Knights
Jaiman Lowe	NRL Telstra Premiership	South Sydney Rabbitohs

=== 2010 Jerseys ===
2010 Home

2010 Away

2010 NAIDOC special

The NAIDOC Week jersey was unveiled at the launch of the Pride's 'Reconciliation Action Plan', which had been accepted by Reconciliation Australia, a first for any rugby league club in the country. The jersey was designed by local indigenous artists, Aboriginal man Kevin Edmondston and Torres Strait Islander Joey Laifoo, and was manufactured by EMU Sportswear in Townsville. The Pride wore it in they Round 16 clash against the Ipswich Jets at Barlow Park.

=== Trial matches ===
Pre-season Trial 1
Friday
12 February 2010
19:00 AEST (UTC+10)

Northern Pride	12–32	NYC NQ Cowboys U-20s
Tries: ? Goals: ?		Tries: ? Goals: ?

Tully Showgrounds
(Tully, QLD)

Skill360 Northern Pride: 1. Ben Fitzpatrick – FB 2. Freddie Fauid – WG 3. Brenton Bowen – CE 4. Taputoa Sonny Rea – CE 5. Drew Campbell – WG 6. Chris Riesen – FE 7. Eric Smith – HB 8. Ben Spina – PR 9. Jay Aston – HK 10. Ben Laity – PR 11. Noel Underwood 12. Jamie Frizzo 13. Joel Riethmuller
Unlimited Interchange: 14. Jason Roos 15. Nick Obodin 16. Alex Starmer 17. Rod Griffin 18. Kaine Manihera* 19. Darryl Grant , 20. Nigel Naawi 21. Mark Dalle Cort 22. Siaosi Liumaunu
* = Cowboys allocation.
Unavailable: Quincy To'oto'o-ulugia (suspended).
NYC U-20s Cowboys: ?

Pre-season Trial 2
Saturday
13 February 2010
19:30 AEST (UTC+10)

Northern Pride	20–16	St George Illawarra Dragons Combined Squad
Tries: ? Goals: ?	Cairns Post Report	Tries: ? Goals: ?

Davies Park
(Mareeba, QLD)

Skill360 Northern Pride: 1. Chey Bird – FB 2. Darryl Grant – WG 3. Nick Obodin – CE 4. Mark Dalle Cort – CE 5. Kaine Manihera* – WG 6. Chris Riesen – FE 7. Ryan Stig – HB 8. Alex Starmer – PR 9. Jason Roos – HK 10. Jaiman Lowe – PR 11. Noel Underwood – SR 12. Ben Spina – SR 13. Rod Griffin – LK
Unlimited Interchange: 14. Jay Aston 15. Chris Sheppard (c) 16. Drew Campbell 17. Ben Fitzpatrick 18. Ben Laity 19. Freddie Fauid 20. Nigel Naawi 21. Taputoa Sonny Rea 22. Siaosi Liumaunu
* = Cowboys allocation.
Unavailable: Quincy To'oto'o-ulugia (suspended).
St George Illawarra Dragons: 1. Chris Astill, 2. Kalifa Fai Fai Loa, 3. Travis Roche, 4. Jarred Brodrick, 5. Dave Cattarall, 6. Kane Gillies, 7. Scott Rosser, 8. Justin King, 9. Cameron King, 10.Jack Stockwell, 11.Sam Campbell, 12.Alex McKinnon, 13.Wes Suckley.
Unlimited Interchange: 14. Max Ray, 15. Jack DeBelin, 16. Jarrod Thompson, 17. Mitch Rein, 18. Tim Moore, 19. Simon Maslanka, 20. Kyle Mallyon.

Pre-season Trial 3
Saturday
20 February 2010
17:30 AEST (UTC+10)

Northern Pride	24–38	North Queensland Cowboys Combined Squad
Tries: Brenton Bowen 2 Noel Underwood 1 Drew Campbell 1 Kaine Manihera* 1 Goals: Ryan Stig 1 Chey Bird 1		Tries: 1 Callum Haywood; 1 Kyle Feldt; 1 Will Topou; 1 Wayne Ulugia; 1 Isaac Ah Mau; 2 Donald Malone; Goals: 4 Donald Malone; 1 Shannon Gallant

Barlow Park
(Severin Street, Parramatta Park, QLD)

Skill360 Northern Pride: 1. Chey Bird – FB 2. Brenton Bowen – WG 3. Brett Anderson – CE 4. Mark Dalle Cort – CE 5. Tapu Rea – WG 6. Ryan Stig – FE 7. Chris Sheppard (c) – HB 8. Ben Laity – PR 9. Jay Aston – HK 10. Jaiman Lowe – PR 11. Mark Cantoni – SR 12. Jamie Frizzo – SR 13. Joel Riethmuller – LK
Unlimited Interchange: 14. Rod Griffin 15. Chris Riesen 16. Alex Starmer 17. Noel Underwood 18. Drew Campbell 19. Ben Fitzpatrick 20. Darryl Grant 21. Kaine Manihera* 22. Jason Roos 23. Freddy Fauid
Unavailable: Quincy To'oto'o-ulugia (suspended).
NQ Cowboys Combined Squad: ?

Pre-season Trial 4
Saturday
27 February 2010
17:00 AEST (UTC+10)

Northern Pride	28–28	Windsor Wolves
Tries: Brett Anderson 3 Brenton Bowen 2 Goals: Ryan Stig 4	Match Preview; Match Report	Tries: 1 Brad Clarke; 1 Michael Fualalo; 1 David Tangata-Toa; 1 Jesse Senelefao; 1 Craig Trindall; Goals: 4 Trindall

Jones Park
(Mann Street, Westcourt, Cairns)

Skill360 Northern Pride: 1. Ben Fitzpatrick – FB 2. Freddie Fauid – WG 3. Brett Anderson – CE 4. Mark Dalle Cort – CE 5. Brenton Bowen – WG 6. Ryan Stig (c) – FE 7. Drew Campbell – HB 8. Ben Laity – PR 9. Clint Amos* – HK 10. Jaiman Lowe – PR 11. Jamie Frizzo – SR 12. Mark Cantoni – SR 13. Dane Hogan* – LK
Unlimited Interchange: 14. Jason Roos 15. Joel Riethmuller 16. Rod Griffin 17. Noel Underwood 18. Chris Riesen 20. Alex Starmer
* = Cowboys allocation.
Unavailable: Taputoa Sonny Rea (injury), Quincy To'oto'o-ulugia (suspended), Chey Bird (hand). Chris Sheppard (shin),
Windsor Wolves: ?

=== Intrust Super Cup matches ===
ROUND 1: Intrust Super Cup 2010

Saturday
13 March 2010
19:00 AEST (UTC+10)

Northern Pride	6 – 16	Sunshine Coast Sea Eagles
Tries: Mark Dalle Cort 1 Goals: Ryan Stig 1	On Report: Joel Riethmuller; Clint Amos*; Match Report	Tries: 1 Dennis Sandow; 1 Darcy Lassick; 1 Jamie Buhrer; Goals: 2 Dennis Sandow

Barlow Park
(Severin Street, Parramatta Park, QLD)
Referee: Justin Davis

Skill360 Northern Pride: 1. Ben Fitzpatrick – FB 2. Drew Campbell – WG 3. Brett Anderson – CE 4. Mark Dalle Cort – CE 5. Brenton Bowen – WG 6. Ryan Stig – FE 7. Chris Sheppard (c) – HB 8. Ben Laity – PR 9. Clint Amos* – HK 10. Jaiman Lowe – PR 11. Jamie Frizzo – SR 12. Mark Cantoni – SR 13. Joel Riethmuller – LK
Interchange: 14. Jason Roos, 15. Noel Underwood, 16. Alex Starmer, 20. James Tamou*.
* = Cowboys allocation.
Unavailable: Quincy To'oto'o-ulugia (suspended), Chey Bird (hand).
Sunshine Coast Sea Eagles: 1. Dennis Sandow, 2. Michael Chapman, 3. Mark Page, 4. Kyle Lodge, 5. Zane Mc Carthy, 6. Daly Cherry-Evans, 7. Trent Hodkinson, 8. Phil Morwood, 9. Cameron Joyce, 10. Junior Palau, 11. Jamie Buhrer, 12. Darcy Lassick, 13. Jon Muir.
Interchange: 14. Rob Godfrey, 15. Vic Mauro, 16. Simon Allen, 17. Ben Whiddon.
- Note: Joel Riethmuller and Clint Amos* were placed on report for a dangerous throw. Amos* was found not guilty, but Riethmuller received a four-week ban.
  This was the Pride debut for Ben Fitzpatrick, Mark Dalle Cort, Brenton Bowen, Ryan Stig and Jaiman Lowe (Pride Players 048-052).

Position	Round 1 – 2010	P	W	D	L	For	Against	Diff	Pts
10	Northern Pride	1	0	0	1	6	16	−10	0

ROUND 2: Intrust Super Cup 2010

Saturday
20 March 2010
19:00 AEST (UTC+10)

Northern Pride	16 – 18	Wynnum Manly Seagulls
Tries: Mark Cantoni 2 Jamie Frizzo 1 James Tamou* 1 Goals: 0	Match Report	Tries: 2 Vincent Silulu; 1 Jack Afamasaga Goals: 3 Matt Seamark

Barlow Park
(Severin Street, Parramatta Park, QLD)
Referee: Shane Spicer

Skill360 Northern Pride: 1. Ben Fitzpatrick – FB 2. Drew Campbell – WG 3. Brett Anderson – CE 4. Jamie Frizzo – CE 5. Brenton Bowen – WG 6. Ryan Stig – FE 7. Chris Sheppard (c) – HB 8. Ben Laity – PR 9. Jason Roos – HK 10. Jaiman Lowe – PR 11. Noel Underwood – SR 12. Mark Cantoni – SR 13. Clint Amos* – LK
Interchange: 14. Jay Aston, 15. Mark Dalle Cort, 16. Dane Hogan*, 20. James Tamou*.
* = Cowboys allocation.
Unavailable: Quincy To'oto'o-ulugia (suspended), Chey Bird (hand), Joel Riethmuller (judiciary).
Wynnum-Manly Seagulls: 1. Shea Moylan, 2. Vincent Silulu, 3. Steve Michaels, 4. David Seage, 5. Shaun Cotter, 6. Ben Cronin, 7. Matthew Seamark, 8. Ben Shea, 9. Aoterangi Herangi, 10. Willie Scanlan, 11. Jon Grieve, 12. Darren Bain, 13. Luke Dalziel Don.
Interchange: 14. Jack Afamasaga, 15. Kurtis Curry, 16. Tim Natusch, 17. Jake Granville.
- Note: This was the Pride debut for Jay Aston and North Queensland Cowboys allocation player Dane Hogan* (Players 053 and 054).

Position	Round 2 – 2010	P	W	D	L	For	Against	Diff	Pts
10	Northern Pride	2	0	0	2	22	34	−12	0

ROUND 3: Intrust Super Cup 2010

Sunday
28 March 2010
14:30 AEST (UTC+10)

Souths Logan Magpies	60 – 12	Northern Pride
Tries: Reece Robinson 2 Wade Liddell 2 Michael Brophy 1 Marc Herbert 1 Michael Picker 1 Phil Dennis 1 Josh White 1 Eliakim Uasi 1 Tom Learoyd Lahrs 1 Goals: Brett Kelly 8	Match Report	Tries: 1 Jaiman Lowe; 1 Noel Underwood Goals: 1 Brenton Bowen; 1 Chris Sheppard

Davies Park
(West End, Brisbane, QLD)
Referee: Nick Kalpakidis

Skill360 Northern Pride: 1. Ben Fitzpatrick – FB 2. Kaine Manihera* – WG 18. Mark Dalle Cort – CE 4. Jamie Frizzo – CE 5. Brenton Bowen – WG 13. Clint Amos* – LK 7. Chris Sheppard (c) – HB 8. Manase Manuokafoa* – PR 9. Jay Aston – HK 10. Jaiman Lowe – PR 11. James Tamou* – SR 17. Noel Underwood – SR 12. Mark Cantoni – SR
Interchange: 14. Nick Slyney*, 15. Ben Laity, 16. Dane Hogan*, 20. Taputoa Sonny Rea.
* = Cowboys allocation.
Unavailable: Brett Anderson (chicken pox), Ryan Stig (ankle), Quincy To'oto'o-ulugia (suspended), Chey Bird (hand), Joel Riethmuller (judiciary).
Souths Logan Magpies: 1. Quentin Laulu-Togagae, 2. Michael Brophy, 3. Brett Kelly, 4. Brad Cross, 5. Matt Ward, 6. Marc Herbert, 7. Michael Picker, 8. Cy Lasscock, 9. Eliakim Uasi, 10. Kieran Whalley, 11. Josh White, 12. Jarrad Kennedy, 13. Phil Dennis (c).
Interchange: 14. Nick Skinner, 15. Wade Liddell, 16. Mathew Pittman, 17. Lewis Balcomb.
Coach: Mark Beaumont.
- Note: This was the Pride's worst defeat to date. After 3 rounds they had yet to win a game and were at the bottom of the table.
  This was Ben Laity's 50th game for the Pride, having played every single game to date (plus trial matches). He was the first Pride player to reach this milestone.
  This was the Pride debut for Taputoa Sonny Rea and North Queensland Cowboys allocation player Kaine Manihera* (Pride Players 055 & 056).

Position	Round 3 – 2010	P	W	D	L	For	Against	Diff	Pts
12	Northern Pride	3	0	0	3	34	94	−60	0

ROUND 4: Intrust Super Cup 2010

Saturday
3 April 2010
19:00 AEST (UTC+10)

Northern Pride	38 – 6	Tweed Heads Seagulls
Tries: Michael Bani* 2 Chey Bird 1 Jamie Frizzo 1 Rod Griffin 1 Jaiman Lowe 1 Manase Manuokafoa* 1 Goals: Chey Bird 5	Match Report	Tries: 1 Tim Maccan Goals: 1 Cody Nelson

Barlow Park
(Severin Street, Parramatta Park, QLD)
Referee: Chris Butler

Skill360 Northern Pride: 1. Chey Bird – FB 2. Michael Bani* – WG 3. Brett Anderson – CE 4. Jamie Frizzo – CE 5. Brenton Bowen – WG 6. Theeran Pearson – FE 7. Chris Sheppard (c) – HB 8. Ben Laity – PR 9. Clint Amos* – HK 10. Jaiman Lowe – PR 11. Steve Southern* – SR 12. Mark Cantoni – SR 13. Rod Griffin – LK
Interchange: 14. Jason Roos, 15. Nick Slyney*, 17. Manase Manuokafoa*, 20. Carl Webb*.
* = Cowboys allocation.
Unavailable: Quincy To'oto'o-ulugia (suspended), Joel Riethmuller (judiciary), Ryan Stig (ankle).
Tweed Heads Seagulls: 1. Shannon Walker, 2. Cameron White, 3. James Wood, 4. Josh Graham, 5. Dominique Peyroux, 6. Shaun Carney, 7. Yulu McGrady, 8. Brock Hunter, 9. Arron Pawley, 10.Michael Henderson, 11. Will Matthews, 12. Selasi Berdie, 13. Ryan Simpkins (c).
Interchange: 14. Richie Barrett, 15. Matt O'Reilly, 16. Kingi Akauola, 17. Jake Leary.
Coach: Ben Anderson.
- Note: This was the Pride debut for Theeran Pearson and North Queensland Cowboys allocation player Michael Bani* (Pride Players 057 & 058).

Position	Round 4 – 2010	P	W	D	L	For	Against	Diff	Pts
9	Northern Pride	4	1	0	3	72	100	−28	2

ROUND 5: Intrust Super Cup 2010

Saturday
10 April 2010
14:00 AEST (UTC+10)

Ipswich Jets	22 – 16	Northern Pride
Tries: Luke Walker 1 Smith Samau 1 Tyson Lofipo 1 A J Gilbert 1 Goals: Brendon Marshall 3	Match Report	Tries: 1 Chey Bird; 1 Carl Webb*; 1 Rod Griffin Goals: 2 Chey Bird

North Ipswich Reserve
(Ipswich, QLD)
Broadcast live on ABC 1 TV
Referee: Nick Kalpakidis.

Skill360 Northern Pride: 1. Chey Bird – FB 2. Michael Bani* – WG 3. Brett Anderson – CE 4. Jamie Frizzo – CE 5. Ty Williams* – WG 6. Theeran Pearson – FE 7. Chris Sheppard (c) – HB 8. Ben Laity – PR 9. Clint Amos* – HK 10. Jaiman Lowe – PR 11. Carl Webb* – SR 12. Mark Cantoni – SR 13. Rod Griffin – LK
Interchange: 14. Jason Roos, 15. Nick Slyney*, 16. Noel Underwood, 17. Dane Hogan*.
* = Cowboys allocation.
Unavailable: Quincy To'oto'o-ulugia (suspended), Joel Riethmuller (judiciary), Brenton Bowen (injured), Ryan Stig (ankle).
Ipswich Jets: 1. Luke Walker, 2. Ramon Filipine, 3. Marshall Chalk, 4. Brendon Marshall, 5. Smith Samau, 6. Todd Riggs, 7. Callum Waldrum, 8. Paul Stephenson, 9. Michael Fisher, 10. Tyson Lofipo, 11. Jacob Ling, 12. Keiron Lander, 13. Adam Boettcher.
Interchange: 14. Dan Coburn, 15. AJ Gilbert, 16. Ryan Barton, 17. Moses Manu.
Coach: Glenn Lazarus.
- Note: Broadcast live on ABC 1 TV with ABC Sport's Gerry Collins, Warren Boland and David Wright.
  Jamie Frizzo broke his arm.

Position	Round 5 – 2010	P	W	D	L	For	Against	Diff	Pts
11	Northern Pride	5	1	0	4	88	122	−34	2

ROUND 6: Intrust Super Cup 2010

Saturday
17 April 2010
19:00 AEST (UTC+10) AEST (UTC+10)

Northern Pride	20 – 16	Mackay Cutters
Tries: Brett Anderson 1 Jason Roos 1 Joel Riethmuller 1 Rod Griffin 1 Goals: Chey Bird 1	Match Report	Tries: 1 Justin Hunt; 1 Donald Malone; 1 Grant Rovelli Goals: 2 Justin Hunt

Barlow Park
(Severin Street, Parramatta Park, QLD)
Referee: Rob Gallacher

Skill360 Northern Pride: 1. Chey Bird – FB 2. Michael Bani* – WG 3. Brett Anderson – CE 4. Taputoa Sonny Rea – CE 5. Brenton Bowen – WG 19. Chris Riesen – FE 7. Chris Sheppard (c) – HB 8. Ben Laity – PR 9. Jason Roos – HK 10. Jaiman Lowe – PR 11. Steve Southern* – SR 12. Mark Cantoni – SR 13. Joel Riethmuller – LK
Interchange: 14. Rod Griffin, 15. Nick Slyney*, 17. Dane Hogan*, 18. Jay Aston.
* = Cowboys allocation.
Unavailable: Quincy To'oto'o-ulugia (suspended), Jamie Frizzo (broken arm), Theeran Pearson (back injury), Ryan Stig (ankle).
Mackay Cutters: 1. Justin Hunt, 2. Obe Geia, 3. Donald Malone, 4. Tyson Martin, 5. Chris Giumelli, 6. Michael Meigan, 7. Todd Seymour, 8. Liam McDonald, 9. Neil Budworth, 10. Isaak Ah Mau, 11. Darren Griffiths, 12. Jardine Bobongie, 13. Leeson Ah Mau.
Interchange: 14. Shane Muspratt, 15. Mitchell Achurch, 16. Luke Fatnowna, 17. Jerome Iakimo.
Coach: Paul Bramley.

Position	Round 6 – 2010	P	W	D	L	For	Against	Diff	Pts
8	Northern Pride	6	2	0	4	108	138	−30	4

ROUND 7: Intrust Super Cup 2010

Saturday
24 April 2010
19:00 AEST (UTC+10)

Northern Pride	26 – 18	Central Comets
Tries: Brett Anderson 1 Ty Williams* 1 Chris Riesen 1 Ben Laity 1 Goals: Chey Bird 5	Match Report	Tries: 1 Junior Auru; 1 Marc Fickling; 1 Tim Glasby Goals: 3 Ian Webster

Barlow Park
(Severin Street, Parramatta Park, QLD)
Referee: Nick Kalpakidis

Skill360 Northern Pride: 1. Chey Bird – FB 2. Brenton Bowen – WG 3. Brett Anderson – CE 4. Taputoa Sonny Rea – CE 5. Ty Williams* – WG 6. Chris Riesen – FE 7. Chris Sheppard (c) – HB 8. Ben Laity – PR 9. Jason Roos – HK 10. Jaiman Lowe – PR 11. Nick Slyney* – SR 12. Mark Cantoni – SR 13. Joel Riethmuller – LK
Interchange: 14. Jay Aston, 15. Rod Griffin, 16. Dane Hogan*, 17. Manase Manuokafoa*.
* = Cowboys allocation.
Unavailable: Quincy To'oto'o-ulugia (suspended), Jamie Frizzo (broken arm), Theeran Pearson (back injury), Ryan Stig (ankle).
Central Comets: 1. Junior Auru, 2. Jade Williams, 3. Karl Johnson, 4. Josh Bishop, 5. Dallas Williams, 6. Marc Fickling, 7. Matt Minto, 8. Tim Glasby, 9. Ian Webster, 10. Aaron Summers, 11. Tyron Haynes, 12. Darren Mapp, 13. Mick Esdale.
Interchange: 14. Lewis McPhail, 15. Guy Williams, 16. George Jarrett, 17. Gerard Parle.
Coach: Wayne Barnett

Position	Round 7 – 2010	P	W	D	L	For	Against	Diff	Pts
7	Northern Pride	7	3	0	4	134	156	−22	6

ROUND 8: Intrust Super Cup 2010

Split Round
Saturday
8 May 2010
14:00 AEST (UTC+10)

Easts Tigers	32 – 18	Northern Pride
Tries: Adam Breen 2 Kevin Stephensen 1 Ben Vaeau 1 Isaac Kaufmann 1 Goals: Nathan Pill 6	Match Report	Tries: 1 Chey Bird; 1 Joel Riethmuller; 1 Nick Slyney* Goals: 3 Chey Bird

Langlands Park
(Stones Corner, Brisbane, QLD)
Referee: Robert Gallacher

Skill360 Northern Pride: 1. Chey Bird – FB 2. Kaine Manihera* – WG 3. Brett Anderson – CE 4. Taputoa Sonny Rea – CE 5. Ty Williams* – WG 6. Chris Riesen – FE 7. Ryan Stig – HB 8. Ben Laity – PR 9. Jason Roos – HK 10. Jaiman Lowe – PR 11. Nick Slyney* – SR 12. Mark Cantoni (c) – SR 13. Joel Riethmuller – LK
Interchange: 15. Jay Aston, 16. Ben Spina, 18. Rod Griffin, 19. Ben Fitzpatrick.
* = Cowboys allocation.
Unavailable: Quincy To'oto'o-ulugia (suspended), Jamie Frizzo (broken arm), Chris Sheppard (facial fractures), Brenton Bowen (injury).
Easts Tigers: 1. Kevin Stephensen, 2. Junior Ahio, 3. Liam Campbell, 4. Paoa Faamita, 5. Adam Breen, 6. David Georgiou, 7. Jace Van Dijk (c), 8. Ben Vaeau, 9. Isaac Kaufmann, 10. James Stosic, 11. Daniel Fullarton, 12. Matthew McPhee, 13. Mark Offerdahl.
Interchange: 14. Fili Sofa, 15. Cameron Durnford, 16. Lance Morris, 17. Dean Sheppard.
Coach: Jason Gainey
- Note: This was the Pride debut for Ben Spina (Player 059).

Position	Round 8 – 2010	P	W	D	L	For	Against	Diff	Pts
8	Northern Pride	8	3	0	5	152	188	−36	6

ROUND 9: Intrust Super Cup 2010

Saturday
15 May 2010
16:00 AEST (UTC+10)

Northern Pride	24 – 12	Redcliffe Dolphins
Tries: Brett Anderson 1 Ty Williams* 1 Mark Cantoni 1 Nick Slyney* 1 Ben Spina 1 Goals: Chey Bird 2	Match Report	Tries: 1 Marty Hatfield; 1 Tim Yee Goals: 2 Liam Georgetown

Pride Oval
(Irene Street, Mooroobool, QLD)
Referee: Shane Spicer.

Skill360 Northern Pride: 1. Chey Bird – FB 2. Brenton Bowen – WG 3. Brett Anderson – CE 4. Taputoa Sonny Rea – CE 5. Ty Williams* – WG 6. Quincy To'oto'o-ulugia – FE 7. Ryan Stig – HB 8. Ben Laity – PR 19. Clint Amos* – PR 10. Jaiman Lowe – PR 18. Steve Southern* – SR 12. Mark Cantoni (c) – SR 13. Joel Riethmuller – LK
Interchange: 9. Jay Aston, 11. Nick Slyney*, 16. Ben Spina, 20. Manase Manuokafoa*.
* = Cowboys allocation.
Unavailable: Jamie Frizzo (broken arm), Chris Sheppard (facial fractures).
Redcliffe Dolphins: 1. Ryan Cullen, 2. Marty Hatfield, 3. Paul Ivan, 4. Mitch Rivett, 5. Liam Georgetown, 6. Chris Fox, 7. Craig Priestly, 8. Chris Farrell, 9. Michael Roberts, 10. Dave Hala, 11. Matt Handcock, 12. Troy Giess, 13. Tim Yee.
Interchange: 14. Matt Britt, 15. Adam Marr, 16. Tommy Butterfield, 17. Greg Byrnes.
Coach: John Dixon.
- Note: Barlow Park was unavailable as the running track was being relaid

Position	Round 9 – 2010	P	W	D	L	For	Against	Diff	Pts
6	Northern Pride	9	4	0	5	176	200	−24	8

ROUND 10: Intrust Super Cup 2010

Saturday
22 May 2010
14:00 AEST (UTC+10)

Norths Devils	26 – 14	Northern Pride
Tries: Daniel Ogden 2 Jack Reed 2 Brendon Gibb 1 Goals: Troyden Watene 3	Match Report	Tries: 1 Michael Bani*; 1 Taputoa Sonny Rea; 1 Ben Laity; Goals: 1 Quincy To'oto'o-ulugia

Albert Bishop Park
(Hedley Avenue, Nundah QLD)
Broadcast live on ABC 1 TV
Referee: Clayton Sharpe.

Skill360 Northern Pride: 1. Chey Bird – FB 2. Michael Bani* – WG 3. Brett Anderson – CE 4. Taputoa Sonny Rea – CE 5. Ty Williams* – WG 6. Quincy To'oto'o-ulugia1 – FE 7. Ryan Stig – HB 8. Ben Laity – PR 9. Clint Amos* – HK 10. Jaiman Lowe – PR 11. Steve Southern* – SR 12. Mark Cantoni (c) – SR 13. Joel Riethmuller – LK
Interchange: 14. Jay Aston, 15. Nick Slyney*, 16. Dane Hogan*, 17. Manase Manuokafoa*.
* = Cowboys allocation.
Unavailable: Jamie Frizzo (broken arm), Chris Sheppard (facial fractures).
Norths Devils: 1. Javarn White, 2. Daniel Ogden, 3. Josefa Davui, 4. Jack Reed, 5. Gideon Mzembe, 6. Shane Perry, 7. Matt Smith, 8. Mark Leafa, 9. Asher Elemani, 10. Josh McGuire, 11. Troyden Watene, 12. Brendon Gibb, 13. Eddy Purcell.
Interchange: 14. Jacob Fauid, 15. Aaron Trinder, 16. Troy Hansen, 17. Mick Morris.
Coach: Kevin Carmichael.
- Note: Broadcast live on ABC 1 TV with ABC Sport's Gerry Collins, Warren Boland and David Wright.
  Seven North Queensland Cowboys played for the Pride this week – Michael Bani*, Ty Williams*, Clint Amos*, Steve Southern*, Nick Slyney*, Dane Hogan*, Manase Manuokafoa*.

Position	Round 10 – 2010	P	W	D	L	For	Against	Diff	Pts
9	Northern Pride	10	4	0	6	190	226	−36	8

ROUND 11: Intrust Super Cup 2010

Saturday
29 May 2010
16:00 AEST (UTC+10)

Northern Pride	20 – 6	Burleigh Bears
Tries: Ty Williams* 2 Mark Cantoni 1 Dane Hogan* 1 Goals: Chey Bird 2	Match Report	Tries: 1 Nathan Ross Goals: 1 Nick Parfitt

Pride Oval
(Irene Street, Mooroobool, QLD)
Referee: Nick Kalpakidis.

Skill360 Northern Pride: 1. Chey Bird – FB 19. Michael Bani* – WG 3. Brett Anderson – CE 4. Taputoa Sonny Rea – CE 5. Ty Williams* – WG 6. Quincy To'oto'o-ulugia (c) – FE 7. Ryan Stig – HB 8. Ben Laity – PR 9. Clint Amos* – HK 10. Jaiman Lowe – PR 17. Manase Manuokafoa* – SR 12. Mark Cantoni – SR 13. Joel Riethmuller – LK
Interchange: 11. Dane Hogan*, 14. Jay Aston, 16. Ben Spina, 18. Noel Underwood.
* = Cowboys allocation.
Unavailable: Jamie Frizzo (broken arm), Chris Sheppard (facial fractures).
Burleigh Bears: 1. Nick Parfitt, 2. Germaine Paulson, 3. Adam Fielder, 4. Chad Grintell, 5. Nathan Ross, 6. Richie Williams, 7. Brent McConnell, 8. Kale Burton, 9. Scott Smith, 10. Dayne Weston, 11. Riley Brown, 12. Martin Griese, 13. Matt Pow.
Interchange: 14. Brett O'Farrell, 15. Robert Apanui, 16. Brad Baldry, 17. Kurt Sorensen.
Coach: Mark Gee.
- Note: Barlow Park was unavailable as the running track was being relaid.
  The QRL judiciary suspended Jaiman Lowe for three weeks after on-field brawl, when Bears front-rower Bodene Thompson broke Lowe's nose.

Position	Round 11 – 2010	P	W	D	L	For	Against	Diff	Pts
7	Northern Pride	11	5	0	6	210	232	−22	10

ROUND 12: Intrust Super Cup 2010

Sunday
6 June 2010
14:00 AEST (UTC+10)

Sunshine Coast Sea Eagles	64 – 0	Northern Pride
Tries: Dennis Sandow 2 Filinga Filiga 2 Darcy Lussick 2 Michael Chapman 1 Tyrone Coppedge 1 Jamie Buhrer 1 Daly Cherry-Evans 1 Jon Muir 1 Terence Seu Seu 1 Goals: Michael Chapman 8	Match Report	Tries: Goals: 0

Stockland Park
(Sportsmans Parade, Bokarina, Kawana Waters, QLD)
Referee: Shane Spicer.

Skill360 Northern Pride: 1. Chey Bird – FB 2. Ty Williams* – WG 3. Brett Anderson – CE 4. Taputoa Sonny Rea – CE 5. John Williams* – WG 6. Quincy To'oto'o-ulugia – FE 7. Ryan Stig – HB 8. Ben Laity – PR 9. Clint Amos* – HK 10. Manase Manuokafoa* – PR 11. Dane Hogan* – SR 12. Mark Cantoni (c) – SR 13. Joel Riethmuller – LK
Interchange: 14. Jay Aston, 15. Rod Griffin, 16. Ben Spina, 17. Noel Underwood.
* = Cowboys allocation.
Unavailable: Jaiman Lowe (released to play with South Sydney Rabbitohs, Jamie Frizzo (broken arm), Chris Sheppard (facial fractures).
Sunshine Coast Sea Eagles: 1. Dennis Sandow, 2. Michael Chapman, 3. Filinga Filiga, 4. Mark Page, 5. Tyrone Coppedge, 6. Jamie Buhrer, 7. Daly Cherry-Evans, 8. Phil Morwood, 9. Cameron Joyce, 10. Vic Mauro, 11. Darcy Lussick, 12. Jason Wardrop, 13. Jon Muir.
Interchange: 14. Junior Palau, 15. Joel McCrae, 16. Rob Godfrey, 17. Kyle Lodge, 18. Simon Allen.
Coach: Brandon Costin.
- Note: This was the Pride's greatest defeat to date.
  This was Chey Bird's 50th game for the Pride.

Position	Round 12 – 2010	P	W	D	L	For	Against	Diff	Pts
8	Northern Pride	12	5	0	7	210	296	−86	10

ROUND 13: Intrust Super Cup 2010

Sunday
13 June 2010
15:00 AEST (UTC+10)

Wynnum Manly Seagulls	14 – 10	Northern Pride
Tries: Sam Te'o 1 Luke Dalziel-Don 1 Goals: Matt Seamark 3	Match Report	Tries: 2 Ryan Stig Goals: 1 Ryan Stig

BMD Kougari Oval
(Manly West, Brisbane, QLD)
Referee: Shane Spicer.

Skill360 Northern Pride:1. Ty Williams* – FB 2. Jamie Frizzo – WG 3. Brett Anderson – CE 4. Chey Bird – CE 19. Michael Bani* – WG 7. Ryan Stig – FE 18. Chris Sheppard (c) – HB 8. Ben Laity – PR 9. Clint Amos* – HK 10. Manase Manuokafoa* – PR 11. Nick Slyney* – SR 12. Mark Cantoni – SR 20. Rod Griffin – LK
Interchange: 6. Quincy To'oto'o-ulugia, 14. Jay Aston, 16. Ben Spina, 17. Noel Underwood.
* = Cowboys allocation.
Wynnum Manly Seagulls: 1. Jake Granville, 2. Shea Moylan, 3. Sam Te'o, 4. David Seage, 5. Shaun Cotter, 6. John Peterson, 7. Matt Seamark, 8. Tim Natusch, 9. Aoterangi Herangi, 10. Willie Scanlan, 11. Jack Afamasaga, 12. Darren Bain, 13. Luke Dalziel-Don.
Interchange: 14. Jon Grieve, 15. Hanan Laban, 16. Chris Birch, 17. Brett Thomas.
Coach: Paul Green.

Position	Round 13 – 2010	P	W	D	L	For	Against	Diff	Pts
9	Northern Pride	13	5	0	8	220	310	−90	10

ROUND 14: Intrust Super Cup 2010

Saturday
19 June 2010
19:00 AEST (UTC+10)

Northern Pride	12 – 4	Souths Logan Magpies
Tries: Kaine Manihera* 1 Ryan Stig 1 Goals: Ryan Stig 2	Match Report 1 Match Report 2	Tries: 1 James Tutuila Goals: 0

Barlow Park
(Severin Street, Parramatta Park, QLD)
Referee: Justin Davis

Skill360 Northern Pride:1. Ty Williams* – FB 18. Kaine Manihera* – WG 3. Brett Anderson – CE 4. Chey Bird – CE 5. Michael Bani* – WG 6. Ryan Stig – FE 7. Chris Sheppard (c) – HB 8. Ben Laity – PR 9. Clint Amos* – HK 17. Noel Underwood – PR 11. Nick Slyney* – SR 12. Mark Cantoni – SR 13. Joel Riethmuller – LK
Interchange: 14. Jay Aston, 15. Rod Griffin, 16. Ben Spina,, 20. Alex Starmer.
* = Cowboys allocation.
Unavailable: Jamie Frizzo (broken arm – again).
Souths Logan Magpies: 1. Quentin Laulu-Togagae, 2. Michael Brophy, 3. Brett Kelly, 4. Shaun Daylight, 5. Reece Robinson, 6. Bradley Cross, 7. Marc Herbert, 8. Lewis Balcomb, 9. Matt King, 10. Kieran Whalley, 11. Jarrod Kennedy, 12. Danny Galea, 13. Phil Dennis (c).
Interchange: 14. James Tutuila, 15. Wade Liddell, 16. Nick Skinner, 17. Sam Crabb.
Coach: Mark Beaumont.
- Note: Jay Aston left the Pride after this round to join Norths Devils.

Position	Round 14 – 2010	P	W	D	L	For	Against	Diff	Pts
9	Northern Pride	14	6	0	8	232	314	−82	12

ROUND 15: Intrust Super Cup 2010

Saturday
4 July 2010
14:00 AEST (UTC+10)

Tweed Heads Seagulls	18 – 32	Northern Pride
Tries: Cameron White 1 Dominique Peyroux 1 Kingi Akauola 1 Goals: Brad Davis 3		Tries: 1 Ty Williams*; 1 Brett Anderson; 1 Michael Bani*; 1 Nick Slyney*; 1 Ben Laity; Goals: 5 Ryan Stig; 1 Chris Sheppard

Ned Byrne Oval
(Cudgen Park, (Kingscliff, NSW)
Referee: Robert Gallacher

Skill360 Northern Pride:1. Ty Williams* – FB 2. Kaine Manihera* – WG 3. Brett Anderson – CE 4. Chey Bird – CE 5. Michael Bani* – WG 6. Ryan Stig – FE 7. Chris Sheppard (c) – HB 8. Ben Laity – PR 9. Jason Roos – HK 10. Noel Underwood – PR 11. Nick Slyney* – SR 12. Mark Cantoni – SR 13. Joel Riethmuller – LK
Interchange: 15. Rod Jensen, 16. Ben Spina, 18. Rod Griffin, 20. Mark Dalle Cort.
* = Cowboys allocation.
Unavailable: Jamie Frizzo (broken arm – again), Jay Aston (resigned), Brenton Bowen (foot).
Tweed Heads Seagulls: 1. Shannon Walker, 2. Cameron White, 3. James Wood, 4. Josh Graham, 5. Dominique Peyroux, 6. Kayne Lawton, 7. Brad Davis, 8. Brock Hunter, 9. Tim Maccan, 10. Selasi Berdie, 11. Tom Kingston, 12. Ben Ridge, 13. Ryan Milligan.
Interchange: 15. Jake Leary, 16. Kingi Akauola, 17. Matt O'Reilly, 18. Steve Darby.
Coach: Ben Anderson.
- Note: Rod Jensen returned from retirement.
  This was Chris Sheppard's 50th game for the Pride.

Position	Round 15 – 2010	P	W	D	L	For	Against	Diff	Pts
8	Northern Pride	15	7	0	8	264	332	−68	14

ROUND 16: Intrust Super Cup 2010

Friday
9 July 2010
19:00 AEST (UTC+10)

Northern Pride	36 – 8	Ipswich Jets
Tries: Clint Amos* 2 Ty Williams* 1 Mark Dalle Cort 1 Michael Bani* 1 Ryan Stig 1 Nick Slyney* 1 Goals: Ryan Stig 4	Match Report	Tries: 2 Luke Walker Goals: 0

Barlow Park
(Severin Street, Parramatta Park, QLD)
Referee: Clayton Sharpe.

Skill360 Northern Pride:1. Ty Williams* – FB 2. Michael Bani* – WG 3. Brett Anderson – CE 4. Chey Bird – CE 5. Mark Dalle Cort – WG 6. Ryan Stig – FE 7. Chris Sheppard (c) – HB 8. Ben Laity – PR 9. Clint Amos* – HK 10. Noel Underwood – PR 11. Nick Slyney* – SR 12. Mark Cantoni – SR 13. Joel Riethmuller – LK
Interchange: 14. Jason Roos, 15. Rod Jensen, 16. Ben Spina, 17. Alex Starmer.
* = Cowboys allocation.
Unavailable: Jamie Frizzo (broken arm – again), Jay Aston (resigned), Brenton Bowen (foot).
Ipswich Jets: 1. Marshall Chalk, 2. Ramon Filipine, 3. Esi Tonga, 4. Brendon Marshall, 5. Luke Walker, 6. Callum Waldrum, 7. Ian Lacey, 8. Paul Stephenson, 9. Adam Boettcher, 10. Sepuloni Alovili, 11. Jacob Ling, 12. Vili Fainga'a, 13. Sam Martin.
Interchange: 14. Dan Coburn, 15. Aaron Cannings, 16. Ryan Barton, 17. Dale Robertson.
Coach: Glenn Lazarus.
- Note: The Pride wore a special NAIDOC jersey designed by Kevin Edmondston (Aboriginal) and Joey Laifoo (Torres Strait Islander).
  This was the Pride's first three consecutive wins for the season.

Position	Round 16 – 2010	P	W	D	L	For	Against	Diff	Pts
8	Northern Pride	16	8	0	8	300	340	−40	16

ROUND 17: Intrust Super Cup 2010

Sunday
18 July 2010
15:00 AEST (UTC+10)

Mackay Cutters	16 – 22	Northern Pride
Tries: Chris Giumelli 1 Justin Hunt 1 Luke Fatnowna 1 Goals: Justin Hunt 2	Match Report 1 Match Report 2	Tries: 1 Chey Bird; 1 Kaine Manihera*; 1 Ryan Stig; 1 Nick Slyney*; Goals: 3 Ryan Stig

Mackay Junior Fields
(Bridge Road, South Mackay, QLD)
Referee: Clayton Sharpe

Skill360 Northern Pride:1. Ty Williams* – FB 2. Michael Bani* – WG 3. Brett Anderson – CE 4. Chey Bird – CE 5. Kaine Manihera* – WG 6. Ryan Stig – FE 7. Chris Sheppard (c) – HB Rls player|no=8.|pos=PR|name= Noel Underwood, 14. Jason Roos – HK 10. Ben Laity – PR 11. Nick Slyney* – SR 12. Mark Cantoni – SR 13. Joel Riethmuller – LK
Interchange: 15. Rod Jensen, 16. Ben Spina, 17. Alex Starmer, 18. Mark Dalle Cort.
* = Cowboys allocation.
Unavailable: Jamie Frizzo (broken arm – again), Jay Aston (resigned), Brenton Bowen (foot).
Mackay Cutters: 1. Shannon Gallant, 2. Donald Malone, 3. Michael Comerford, 4. Tyson Martin, 5. Chris Giumelli, 6. Michael Meigan, 7. Todd Seymour, 8. Liam McDonald, 9. Neil Budworth, 10. Zac Dalton, 11. Darren Griffiths, 12. Jardine Bobongie, 13. Grant Moore.
Interchange: 14. Justin Hunt, 15. Shane Muspratt, 16. Regan Hyde, 17. Luke Fatnowna.
Coach: Paul Bramley.

Position	Round 17 – 2010	P	W	D	L	For	Against	Diff	Pts
8	Northern Pride	17	9	0	8	322	356	−34	18

ROUND 18: Intrust Super Cup 2010

Saturday
24 July 2010
19:00 AEST (UTC+10)

Central Comets	22 – 42	Northern Pride
Tries: Jade Williams 1 Ian Webster 1 Mick Esdale 1 Marc Fickling 1 Goals: Ian Webster 2 Matt Minto 1	Match Report	Tries: 2 Brett Anderson; 1 Michael Bani*; 1 Chey Bird; 1 Ryan Stig; 1 Ben Laity; 1 Rod Jensen; Goals: 7 Ryan Stig

Browne Park
(Wandal, Rockhampton, QLD)
Referee: Justin Davis

Skill360 Northern Pride: 4. Chey Bird – FB 2. Michael Bani* – WG 3. Brett Anderson – CE 15. Rod Jensen – CE 22. John Williams* – WG 6. Ryan Stig – FE 7. Chris Sheppard (c) – HB 8. Noel Underwood – PR 9. Clint Amos* – HK 10. Ben Laity – PR 11. Nick Slyney* – SR 12. Mark Cantoni – SR 13. Joel Riethmuller – LK
Interchange: 5. Kaine Manihera*, 14. Jason Roos, 16. Ben Spina, 17. Alex Starmer.
* = Cowboys allocation.
Unavailable: Jamie Frizzo (broken arm – again), Jay Aston (resigned), Brenton Bowen (foot).
Central Comets: 1. Matt Minto, 2. Junior Auru, 3. Josh Bishop, 4. Jade Williams, 5. Dallas Williams, 6. Guy Williams, 7. Ian Webster, 8. Tim Glasby, 9. Marc Fickling, 10. Liam Anlezark, 11. Tyron Haynes, 12. Chris Beasley, 13. Mick Esdale.
Interchange: 14. Joseph Collins-Soo, 15. Chris Gesch, 16. George Tuakura, 17. Guy Ford.
Coach: Wayne Barnett.
- Note: This was Jason Roos' 50th game for the Pride. He was the 5th player to reach 50 games, after Ben Laity, Mark Cantoni, Chey Bird and Chris Sheppard.

Position	Round 18 – 2010	P	W	D	L	For	Against	Diff	Pts
8	Northern Pride	18	10	0	8	364	378	−14	20

ROUND 19: Intrust Super Cup 2010

Saturday
31 July 2010
19:00 AEST (UTC+10)

Northern Pride	32 – 24	Easts Tigers
Tries: Rod Jensen 2 Michael Bani* 1 John Williams* 1 Chris Sheppard 1 Ben Laity 1 Goals: Ryan Stig 4	Match Report	Tries: 1 Matthew Lindsay; 1 Paoa Faamita; 1 Isaac Kaufmann; 1 Ben Vaeau Goals: 4 Paoa Faamita

Barlow Park
(Severin Street, Parramatta Park, QLD)
Referee: Robert Gallacher

Skill360 Northern Pride:1. Chey Bird – FB 2. Michael Bani* – WG 3. Brett Anderson – CE 4. Rod Jensen – CE 5. John Williams* – WG 6. Ryan Stig – FE 7. Chris Sheppard (c) – HB 8. Noel Underwood – PR 9. Clint Amos* – HK 10. Ben Laity – PR 11. Nick Slyney* – SR 12. Mark Cantoni – SR 13. Joel Riethmuller – LK
Interchange: 14. Jason Roos, 15. Kaine Manihera*, 16. Alex Starmer, 17. Aisea Namoa.
* = Cowboys allocation.
Unavailable: Jamie Frizzo (broken arm – again), Jay Aston (resigned), Brenton Bowen (foot).
Easts Tigers: 1. Matthew Lindsay, 2. Junior Ahio, 3. Liam Campbell, 4. Paoa Faamita, 5. Adam Breen, 6. Isaac Kaufmann, 7. Jace Van Dijk (c), 8. Ben Vaeau, 9. Dane Phillips, 10. James Stosic, 11. Daniel Fullarton, 12. Matthew McPhee, 13. Dean Sheppard.
Interchange: 14. Fabian Soutar, 15. Brent Williams, 16. Steven Thorpe, 17. Dean Shepherd.
Coach: Jason Gainey.
- Note: This was the Pride debut for Aisea Namoa (Pride Player 062).

Position	Round 19 – 2010	P	W	D	L	For	Against	Diff	Pts
6	Northern Pride	19	11	0	8	396	402	−6	22

ROUND 20: Intrust Super Cup 2010

Split Round
Sunday
14 August 2010
14:30 AEST (UTC+10)

Redcliffe Dolphins	12 – 18	Northern Pride
Tries: Hayden Topliss 1 Tom Butterfield 1 Goals: Hayden Topliss 2	Match Report	Tries: 1 Joel Riethmuller; 1 Ben Laity; 1 Jason Roos; Goals: 3 Ryan Stig

Dolphin Oval
(Klingner Road, Redcliffe, QLD)
Referee: Michael Wise

Skill360 Northern Pride:1. Chey Bird – FB 2. Michael Bani* – WG 3. Brett Anderson – CE 4. Rod Jensen – CE 5. Kaine Manihera* – WG 6. Ryan Stig – FE 7. Chris Sheppard (c) – HB 16. Alex Starmer – PR 9. Clint Amos* – HK 10. Ben Laity – PR 11. Nick Slyney* – SR 12. Mark Cantoni – SR 13. Joel Riethmuller – LK
Interchange: 14. Jason Roos, 15. Ben Spina, 17. Mark Dalle Cort,, 20. 20. Aisea Namoa.
* = Cowboys allocation.
Unavailable: Jamie Frizzo (broken arm – again), Jay Aston (resigned), Brenton Bowen (foot).
Redcliffe Dolphins: ??

Position	Round 20 – 2010	P	W	D	L	For	Against	Diff	Pts
5	Northern Pride	20	12	0	8	414	414	0	24

ROUND 21: Intrust Super Cup 2010

Saturday
21 August 2010
19:00 AEST (UTC+10)

Northern Pride	33 – 26	Norths Devils
Tries: Brett Anderson 1 Ryan Stig 1 Chris Sheppard 1 Joel Riethmuller 1 Ben Spina 1 Goals: Ryan Stig 6 Field Goals: Chris Sheppard 1	Match Report 12; Match Report 2	Tries: 2 Gideon Mzembe; 1 Luke Samoa; 1 Jack Reed; 1 Troyden Watene Goals: 3 Troyden Watene; Field Goals:

Barlow Park
(Severin Street, Parramatta Park, QLD)
Referee: Clayton Sharpe.

Skill360 Northern Pride:1. Chey Bird – FB 2. Michael Bani* – WG 3. Brett Anderson – CE 4. Rod Jensen – CE 5. Kaine Manihera* – WG 6. Ryan Stig – FE 7. Chris Sheppard (c) – HB 8. Alex Starmer – PR 14. Jason Roos 10. Ben Laity – PR 11. Noel Underwood – SR 12. Mark Cantoni – SR 13. Joel Riethmuller – LK
Interchange: 15. Ben Spina, 16. Mark Dalle Cort, 17. Aisea Namoa, 18. Chris Riesen.
* = Cowboys allocation.
Unavailable: Jamie Frizzo (broken arm – again), Jay Aston (resigned), Brenton Bowen (foot), Nick Slyney* (called up to play for North Queensland Cowboys).
Norths Devils: 1. Javarn White, 2. Daniel Ogden, 3. Luke Samoa, 4. Jack Reed, 5. Gideon Mzembe, 6. Shane Perry, 7. Matt Smith, 8. Mark Leafa, 9. Asher Elemani, 10. Natthan Cleaver, 11. Troyden Watene, 12. Brendon Gibb, 13. Eddy Purcell.
Interchange: 14. Jay Aston, 15. Mick Morris, 16. Ashton Sims, 17. Troy Hansen
Coach: Kevin Carmichael.

Position	Round 21 – 2010	P	W	D	L	For	Against	Diff	Pts
5	Northern Pride	21	13	0	8	447	440	+7	26

ROUND 22: Intrust Super Cup 2010

Saturday
28 August 2010
14:00 AEST (UTC+10)

Burleigh Bears	6 – 54	Northern Pride
Tries: Nathan Ross 1 Goals: Nick Parfitt 1	Match Report	Tries: 3 Chey Bird; 2 Kaine Manihera*; 2 Jason Roos; 1 Brenton Bowen; 1 Ryan Stig; 1 Mark Cantoni; Goals: 7 Ryan Stig

Pizzey Park
(Miami, Gold Coast, QLD)
Broadcast live on ABC 1 TV
Referee: Chris Butler

Skill360 Northern Pride: 1. Chey Bird – FB 2. Brenton Bowen – WG 3. Brett Anderson – CE 4. Rod Jensen – CE 5. Kaine Manihera* – WG 6. Ryan Stig – FE 7. Chris Sheppard (c) – HB 8. Alex Starmer – PR 9. Jason Roos – HK 10. Ben Laity – PR 11. Noel Underwood – SR 12. Mark Cantoni – SR 13. Joel Riethmuller – LK
Interchange: 15. Ben Spina, 16. Chris Riesen, 17. Mark Dalle Cort, 18. Rod Griffin.
* = Cowboys allocation.
Unavailable: Jamie Frizzo (broken arm – again), Jay Aston (resigned).
Burleigh Bears: 1. Nick Parfitt, 2. James Cameron, 3. Chad Grintell, 4. Adam Fielder, 5. Nathan Ross, 6. Richie Williams, 7. Brent McConnell, 8. Dayne Weston, 9. Scott Smith, 10. Martin Griese, 11. Tanu Wulf, 12. Riley Brown, 13. Matt Pow.
Interchange: 14. Brenton Lawrence, 15. Rob Apanui, 16. Jimmy Andersen, 17. Kurt Sorensen.
Coach: Mark Gee.
- Note: Broadcast live on ABC 1 TV with ABC Sport's Gerry Collins, Warren Boland and David Wright.
  This was the first time the Pride fielded a team without any North Queensland Cowboys.
  This was the Pride's biggest win – 54–6.

Position	Round 22 – 2010	P	W	D	L	For	Against	Diff	Pts
4	Northern Pride	22	14	0	8	501	446	+55	28

=== 2010 Ladder ===
	Team	Pld	W	D	L	PF	PA	PD	Pts
1	Souths Logan Magpies	22	17	0	5	604	362	+242	34
2	Norths Devils	22	15	1	6	581	505	+76	31
3	Sunshine Coast Sea Eagles	22	14	0	8	641	400	+241	28
4	Northern Pride	22	14	0	8	501	446	+55	28
5	Wynnum Manly Seagulls	22	13	1	8	538	478	+60	27
6	Mackay Cutters	22	11	1	10	544	491	+53	23
7	Burleigh Bears	22	11	1	10	450	484	−34	22
8	Redcliffe Dolphins	22	10	1	11	467	536	−69	21
9	Tweed Heads Seagulls	22	8	0	13	528	498	+30	16
10	Central Comets	22	6	0	16	415	624	−209	12
11	Easts Tigers	22	5	0	17	429	631	−202	10
12	Ipswich Jets	22	5	0	17	384	627	−243	10

==== Northern Pride (regular season 2010) ====
- Win = 14 (9 of 11 home games, 5 of 11 away games)
- Loss = 8 (2 of 11 home games, 6 of 11 away games)

Round	1	2	3	4	5	6	7	8	9	10	11	12	13	14	15	16	17	18	19	20	21	22
Result	L	L	L	W	L	W	W	L	W	L	W	L	L	W	W	W	W	W	W	W	W	W
Ground	H	H	A	H	A	H	H	A	H	A	H	A	A	H	A	H	A	A	H	A	H	A

Source: https://web.archive.org/web/20100820011846/http://www.qrl.com.au/
A = Away; H = Home; B = Bye; W = Win; D = Draw; L = Loss

== Finals Series ==
In 2010, the competition used a modified version of the six-team finals format that they implemented a year earlier.

Semifinals
1	Souths Logan Magpies	16
2	Norths Devils	20
3	Sunshine Coast Sea Eagles	4
6	Northern Pride	28
4	Wynnum Manly Seagulls	12
5	Mackay Cutters	14

Preliminary Finals
1W	Norths Devils	56
3W	Mackay Cutters	12
1L	Souths Logan Magpies	8
2W	Northern Pride	28

Grand Final
Norths Devils	20
Northern Pride	30

Finals Week 1 – Preliminary Final

Sunday
5 September 2010
15:30 AEST (UTC+10)

Northern Pride	28 – 12	Wynnum Manly Seagulls
Tries: Brett Anderson 1 Rod Jensen 1 Ryan Stig 1 Ben Spina 1 Rod Griffin 1 Goals: Ryan Stig 4	Match Report	Tries: 1 Jake Granville; 1 Damien Quinn Goals: 2 Matt Seamark

Barlow Park
(Severin Street, Parramatta Park, QLD)
Referee: Clayton Sharpe

Skill360 Northern Pride:1. Chey Bird – FB 2. Brenton Bowen – WG 3. Brett Anderson – CE 4. Rod Jensen – CE 5. Kaine Manihera* – WG 6. Ryan Stig – FE 7. Chris Sheppard (c) – HB 8. Alex Starmer 9. Jason Roos 10. Ben Laity 11. Noel Underwood 12. Mark Cantoni 13. Joel Riethmuller
Interchange: 14. Ben Spina, 15. Chris Riesen, 16. Mark Dalle Cort, 17. Rod Griffin.

Finals Week 2 – Semi-Final

Sunday
12 September 2010
14:00 AEST (UTC+10)

Souths Logan Magpies	8 – 28	Northern Pride
Tries: David Milne 1 Wade Liddell 1 Goals: 0	Match Report	Tries: 2 Michael Bani*; 2 Rod Jensen; 1 Mark Cantoni; Goals: 3 Chey Bird; 1 Ryan Stig

Davies Park
(West End, Brisbane, QLD)
Broadcast live on ABC 1 TV
Referee: Justin Davis

Skill360 Northern Pride:1. Chey Bird – FB 19. Michael Bani* – WG 3. Brett Anderson – CE 4. Rod Jensen – CE 5. Kaine Manihera* – WG 6. Ryan Stig – FE 7. Chris Sheppard (c) – HB 8. Alex Starmer – PR 9. Jason Roos – HK 10. Ben Laity – PR 11. Nick Slyney* – SR 12. Mark Cantoni – SR 13. Joel Riethmuller – LK
Interchange: 14. Clint Amos*, 15. Ben Spina, 16. Noel Underwood, 17. Mark Dalle Cort.
* = Cowboys allocation.
Unavailable: Ty Williams* (knee).
- Note: Broadcast live on ABC 1 TV with ABC Sport's Gerry Collins, Warren Boland and David Wright.
  Four North Queensland Cowboys were eligible to play for the Pride in the finals series – Ty Williams*, Michael Bani*, Nick Slyney* and Clint Amos*. Coach David Maiden picked Williams, Slyney and Amos and left Bani out, but he was called into the side at the last minute when Williams was ruled out with a knee injury.

=== Grand Final ===
Finals Week 3 – Grand Final

Sunday
19 September 2010
14:00 AEST (UTC+10)

Norths Devils	20 – 30	Northern Pride
Tries: Luke Samoa 2 Brendon Gibb 1 Gideon Mzembe 1 Goals: Troyden Watene 2	1st: 6 – 18; 2nd: 14 – 12; QRL Report; Report; Cairns Post Report; Cairns Post Report; Cairns Post Report; ABC TV Highlights	Tries: 1 Michael Bani*; 1 Rod Griffin; 1 Rod Jensen; 1 Nick Slyney*; 1 Noel Underwood; Goals: 5 Chey Bird

Suncorp Stadium
(Brisbane, QLD)
Broadcast live on ABC 1 TV
Attendance: 6,300
Referee: Justin Davis
Player of the Match: Chris Sheppard (Northern Pride)

Skill360 Northern Pride:1. Chey Bird – FB 2. Michael Bani* – WG 3. Brett Anderson – CE 4. Rod Jensen – CE 5. Kaine Manihera* – WG 14. Clint Amos* – FE 7. Chris Sheppard (c) – HB 8. Noel Underwood – PR 9. Jason Roos – HK 10. Ben Laity – PR 11. Nick Slyney* – SR 12. Mark Cantoni – SR 13. Joel Riethmuller – LK
Interchange: 8. Alex Starmer, 15. Ben Spina, 17. Mark Dalle Cort, 18. Rod Griffin.
* = Cowboys allocation. 4 Cowboys played in the Grand Final.
Unavailable: Ryan Stig (shoulder), Ty Williams* (knee).
- Note: This was the first time the Grand Final had been played on a Sunday (previously it had been played on Saturday).
  It was also the first time since 2007 that the Grand Final was played at Suncorp Stadium.
  The game was broadcast live on ABC 1 TV with ABC Sport's Gerry Collins, Warren Boland and David Wright.
  The Pride held a final training session at Pride Oval on Saturday morning, 18 September 2010 before flying to Brisbane. Fans were invited to a BBQ and to meet the team.
  Norths Devils were favourites to win at $1.72, with the Pride at $2.10

Norths Devils	Position	Northern Pride
1. Javarn White	FB	1. Chey Bird
2. Daniel Ogden	WG	2. Michael Bani*
3. Josefa Davui	CE	3. Brett Anderson
4. Jack Reed	CE	4. Rod Jensen
5. Gideon Mzembe	WG	5. Kaine Manihera*
6. Shane Perry	FE	14. Clint Amos*
7. Matt Smith	HB	7. Chris Sheppard (c)
8. Mark Leafa (c)	PR	16. Noel Underwood
9. Asher Elemani	HK	9. Jason Roos
17. Troy Hansen	PR	10. Ben Laity
11. Troyden Watene	SR	11. Nick Slyney*
12. Brendon Gibb	SR	12. Mark Cantoni
13. Eddy Purcell	LK	13. Joel Riethmuller
10. Nathan Cleaver	Bench	8. Alex Starmer
14. Luke Samoa	Bench	15. Ben Spina
15. Jay Aston	Bench	17. Mark Dalle Cort
16. Michael Morris	Bench	18. Rod Griffin
Kevin Carmichael	Coach	David Maiden

The Norths Devils finished the regular season in second and defeated the minor premiers Souths Logan in the first week of the finals. In the preliminary final they thrashed Mackay 56–12 to qualify for the second Grand Final and their first since 1998. The Pride finished fourth and defeated Wynnum Manly in an elimination final. In the preliminary final, they upset Souths Logan 28–8 to qualify for their second straight Grand Final.

==== First half ====
The Pride started the first half on fire, scoring three tries inside the first 20 minutes. They kicked it off with a try to prop Noel Underwood in the 4th minute before centre Rod Jensen helped double his side's lead in the 15th minute. Winger Michael Bani was the next to score, stepping through some soft defence to push the Pride's lead to 18. It took 37th minutes for the Devils to finally post their first points when second rower Brendon Gibb barged over.

==== Second half ====
The Pride regained their 18-point lead when bench forward Rod Griffin steamrolled his way through to score four minutes after the break. Norths hit back quickly this time, crossing just five minutes later through Luke Samoa. They made it back-to-back tries not long after when winger Gideon Mzembe dived over in the right corner. The comeback attempt was short lived, as the Pride scored their fifth try of the game when Nick Slyney* crossed. Samoa scored off a Pride error in the 72nd minute to give his side a slight chance but it was too little too late. The Pride won their first premiership and became the second club from outside south east Queensland to lift the trophy.

Pride halfback and captain Chris Sheppard was awarded the Duncan Hall Medal in his final game before retirement.

== 2010 Northern Pride players ==
Pride player	Appearances	Tries	Goals	Field goals	Pts
Aisea Namoa	3	0	0	0	0
Alex Starmer	12	0	0	0	0
Ben Fitzpatrick	4	0	0	0	0
Ben Laity	25	6	0	0	24
Ben Spina	16	3	0	0	12
Brenton Bowen	9	1	1	0	6
Brett Anderson	24	8	0	0	32
Chey Bird	22	8	23	0	78
Chris Riesen	6	1	0	0	4
Chris Sheppard	20	2	2	1	13
Drew Campbell	8	0	0	0	0
Jaiman Lowe	11	2	0	0	8
Jamie Frizzo	6	2	0	0	8
Jason Roos	18	4	0	0	16
Jay Aston	11	0	0	0	0
Joel Riethmuller	20	4	0	0	16
Mark Cantoni	25	6	0	0	24
Mark Dalle Cort	12	2	0	0	8
Noel Underwood	18	2	0	0	8
Quincy To'oto'o-ulugia	5	0	1	0	2
Rod Griffin	12	5	0	0	20
Rod Jensen	11	7	0	0	28
Ryan Stig	19	9	53	0	142
Taputoa Sonny Rea	8	1	0	0	4
Theeran Pearson	2	0	0	0	0

=== North Queensland Cowboys who played for the Pride in 2010 ===
Cowboys player	Appearances	Tries	Goals	Field goals	Pts
Carl Webb*	2	1	0	0	4
Clint Amos*	17	2	0	0	8
Dane Hogan*	2	1	0	0	4
James Tamou*	3	1	0	0	4
John Williams*	3	1	0	0	4
Kaine Manihera*	13	4	0	0	16
Manase Manuokafoa*	8	1	0	0	4
Michael Bani*	16	10	0	0	40
Nick Slyney*	18	6	0	0	24
Steve Southern*	4	0	0	0	0
Ty Williams*	12	6	0	0	24

== 2010 venues ==
Northern Pride venues

The Pride played matches at 18 different venues this year, 17 in Queensland and one in NSW:

- Barlow Park, Cairns.
- Jones Park, Cairns.
- Pride Oval, Cairns.
- Tully Showgrounds, Tully.
- Davies Park, Mareeba.
- Davies Park, Brisbane.
- North Ipswich Reserve, Ipswich.
- Langlands Park, Brisbane.
- Albert Bishop Park, Brisbane.
- Stockland Park, Sunshine Coast.
- BMD Kougari Oval, Brisbane.
- Cudgen Park, Kingscliff.
- Mackay Junior Fields, Mackay.
- Browne Park, Rockhampton.
- Dolphin Oval, Redcliffe.
- Pizzey Park, Gold Coast.
- Davies Park, Brisbane.
- Suncorp Stadium, Brisbane.

== 2010 Televised Games ==
In 2010 games were televised by ABC TV and shown live across Queensland through the ABC1 channel at 2.00pm (AEST) on Saturday afternoons. The commentary team was Gerry Collins, Warren Boland and David Wright.

The Pride appeared in five televised games this season:

- Round 5: Northern Pride lost to Ipswich Jets 16–22 at North Ipswich Reserve, Ipswich.
- Round 10: Northern Pride lost to Norths Devils 14–26 at Bishop Park, Nundah.
- Round 22: Northern Pride beat Burleigh Bears 54–6 at Pizzey Park, Miami, Gold Coast.
- Semi-Final: Northern Pride beat Souths Logan Magpies 28–8 at Davies Park, West End, Brisbane.
- Grand Final: Northern Pride beat Norths Devils 30–20 at Suncorp Stadium, Brisbane.
