= 2010 Queensland Cup =

15th Queensland's Rugby League Competition

- Duration: March 13 – September 19, 2010
- Teams: 12
- Premiers: Northern Pride (1st title)
- Minor premiers: Souths Logan Magpies (2nd title)
- Matches played: 138
- Points scored: 6,330
- Top points scorer: Troyden Watene (188)
- Player of the year: Daly Cherry-Evans (Courier Mail Medal)
- Top try-scorer: Daniel Ogden (19)

The 2010 Queensland Cup season was the 15th season of Queensland's top-level statewide rugby league competition run by the Queensland Rugby League. The competition, known as the Intrust Super Cup due to sponsorship from Intrust Super, featured 12 teams playing a 25-week-long season (including finals) from March to September.

The Northern Pride won their first premiership after defeating the Norths Devils 30–20 in the Grand Final at Suncorp Stadium. Sunshine Coast Sea Eagles' halfback Daly Cherry-Evans was named the competition's Player of the Year, winning the Courier Mail Medal.

== Teams ==
In 2010, the lineup of teams remained unchanged for the second consecutive year.

Colours	Club	Home ground(s)	Head coach(s)	Captain(s)	NRL Affiliate
	Burleigh Bears	Pizzey Park	Mark Gee	Scott Smith	Gold Coast Titans
	Central Comets	Browne Park	Wayne Barnett	Tyron Haynes	Brisbane Broncos
	Easts Tigers	Langlands Park	Jason Gainey	Jace van Dijk	Brisbane Broncos
	Ipswich Jets	North Ipswich Reserve	Glenn Lazarus → Ben & Shane Walker	Todd Riggs & Paul Stephenson	Gold Coast Titans
	Mackay Cutters	Mackay JRL Grounds	Paul Bramley	Jardine Bobongie	North Queensland Cowboys
	Northern Pride	Barlow Park	David Maiden	Chris Sheppard	North Queensland Cowboys
	Norths Devils	Bishop Park	Kevin Carmichael	Mark Leafa	Brisbane Broncos
	Redcliffe Dolphins	Dolphin Oval	John Dixon	Mick Roberts	Brisbane Broncos
	Souths Logan Magpies	Davies Park	Mark Beaumont	Phil Dennis	Canberra Raiders
	Sunshine Coast Sea Eagles	Stockland Park	Brandon Costin	Daly Cherry-Evans	Manly Warringah Sea Eagles
	Tweed Heads Seagulls	Ned Byrne Field	Ben Anderson	Brad Davis	Gold Coast Titans
	Wynnum Manly Seagulls	BMD Kougari Oval	Paul Green	Darren Bain	Brisbane Broncos

== Ladder ==
2010 Queensland Cup
Pos	Team	Pld	W	D	L	PF	PA	PD	Pts
1	Souths Logan Magpies	22	17	0	5	604	362	+242	34
2	Norths Devils	22	15	1	6	581	505	+76	31
3	Sunshine Coast Sea Eagles	22	14	0	8	641	400	+241	28
4	Northern Pride (P)	22	14	0	8	501	446	+55	28
5	Wynnum Manly Seagulls	22	13	1	8	538	478	+60	27
6	Mackay Cutters	22	11	1	10	544	491	+53	23
7	Burleigh Bears	22	11	1	10	450	484	-34	22
8	Redcliffe Dolphins	22	10	1	11	467	536	-69	21
9	Tweed Heads Seagulls	22	8	1	13	528	498	+30	16
10	Central Comets	22	6	0	16	415	624	-209	12
11	Easts Tigers	22	5	0	17	429	631	-202	10
12	Ipswich Jets	22	5	0	17	384	627	-243	10

== Final series ==
In 2010, the competition used a modified version of the six-team finals format that they implemented a year earlier.

Home	Score	Away	Match Information
Home	Score	Away	Date and Time (local)	Venue
Semi-finals
Sunshine Coast Sea Eagles	4 – 14	Mackay Cutters	4 September 2010, 2:00pm	Stockland Park
Souths Logan Magpies	16 – 20	Norths Devils	5 September 2010, 3:00pm	Davies Park
Northern Pride	28 – 12	Wynnum Manly Seagulls	5 September 2010, 3:30pm	Barlow Park
Preliminary Finals
Norths Devils	56 – 12	Mackay Cutters	11 September 2010, 2:00pm	Bishop Park
Souths Logan Magpies	8 – 28	Northern Pride	12 September 2010, 2:00pm	Davies Park
Grand Final
Norths Devils	20 – 30	Northern Pride	19 September 2010, 2:00pm	Suncorp Stadium

Semifinals
1	Souths Logan Magpies	16
2	Norths Devils	20
3	Sunshine Coast Sea Eagles	4
6	Northern Pride	28
4	Wynnum Manly Seagulls	12
5	Mackay Cutters	14

Preliminary Finals
1W	Norths Devils	56
3W	Mackay Cutters	12
1L	Souths Logan Magpies	8
2W	Northern Pride	28

Grand Final
Norths Devils	20
Northern Pride	30

== Grand Final ==
Saturday, 13 September

Norths Devils	20 – 30	Northern Pride
Tries: Luke Samoa 2 Brendon Gibb 1 Gideon Mzembe 1 Goals: Troyden Watene 2	1st: 6 - 18; 2nd: 14 - 12; Report	Tries: 1 Michael Bani; 1 Rod Griffin; 1 Rod Jensen; 1 Nick Slyney; 1 Noel Underwood; Goals: 5 Chey Bird

Suncorp Stadium
Referee: Justin Davis
Player of the Match: Chris Sheppard (Northern Pride)

Norths Devils	Position	Northern Pride
1. Javarn White	FB	1. Chey Bird
2. Daniel Ogden	WG	2. Michael Bani
3. Josefa Davui	CE	3. Brett Anderson
4. Jack Reed	CE	4. Rod Jensen
5. Gideon Mzembe	WG	5. Kaine Manihera
6. Shane Perry	FE	14. Clint Amos
7. Matt Smith	HB	7. Chris Sheppard (c)
8. Mark Leafa (c)	PR	16. Noel Underwood
9. Asher Elemani	HK	9. Jason Roos
17. Troy Hansen	PR	10. Ben Laity
11. Troyden Watene	SR	11. Nick Slyney
12. Brendon Gibb	SR	12. Mark Cantoni
13. Eddy Purcell	LK	13. Joel Riethmuller
10. Nathan Cleaver	Bench	8. Alex Starmer
14. Luke Samoa	Bench	15. Ben Spina
15. Jay Aston	Bench	17. Mark Dalle Cort
16. Michael Morris	Bench	18. Rod Griffin
Kevin Carmichael	Coach	David Maiden

The Norths Devils finished the regular season in second and defeated the minor premiers Souths Logan in the first week of the finals. In the preliminary final they thrashed Mackay 56–12 to qualify for the second Grand Final and their first since 1998. The Northern Pride finished fourth and defeated Wynnum Manly in an elimination final. In the preliminary final, they upset Souths Logan 28–8 to qualify for their second straight Grand Final.

=== First half ===
The Pride started the first half on fire, scoring three tries inside the first 20 minutes. They kicked it off with a try to prop Noel Underwood in the 4th minute before centre Rod Jensen helped double his side's lead in the 15th minute. Winger Michael Bani was the next to score, stepping through some soft defence to push the Pride's lead to 18. It took 37th minutes for the Devils to finally post their first points when second rower Brendon Gibb barged over.

=== Second half ===
The Pride regained their 18-point lead when bench forward Rod Griffin steamrolled his way through to score four minutes after the break. Norths hit back quickly this time, crossing just five minutes later through Luke Samoa. They made it back-to-back tries not long after when winger Gideon Mzembe dived over in the right corner. The comeback attempt was short lived, as the Pride scored their fifth try of the game when Nick Slyney crossed. Samoa scored off a Pride error in the 72nd minute to give his side a slight chance but it was too little too late. The Pride won their first premiership and became the second club from outside south east Queensland to lift the trophy.

Pride halfback and captain Chris Sheppard was awarded the Duncan Hall Medal in his final game before retirement.

== End-of-season awards ==
- Courier Mail Medal (Best and Fairest): Daly Cherry-Evans ( Sunshine Coast Sea Eagles)
- QANTAS Player of the Year (Coaches Award): Ryan Cullen ( Redcliffe Dolphins)
- Coach of the Year: Mark Beaumont ( Souths Logan Magpies)
- Rookie of the Year: Daly Cherry-Evans ( Sunshine Coast Sea Eagles)
- Representative Player of the Year: Dayne Weston ( Queensland Residents, Burleigh Bears)

== See also ==
- Queensland Cup
- Queensland Rugby League
