= Manihera =

Manihera is a surname. Notable people with the surname include:

- Jordan Manihera (born 1993), New Zealand rugby union player
- Kaine Manihera (born 1986), New Zealand rugby league player
