= Brett Anderson (rugby league) =

Australian RL coach and former professional rugby league footballer

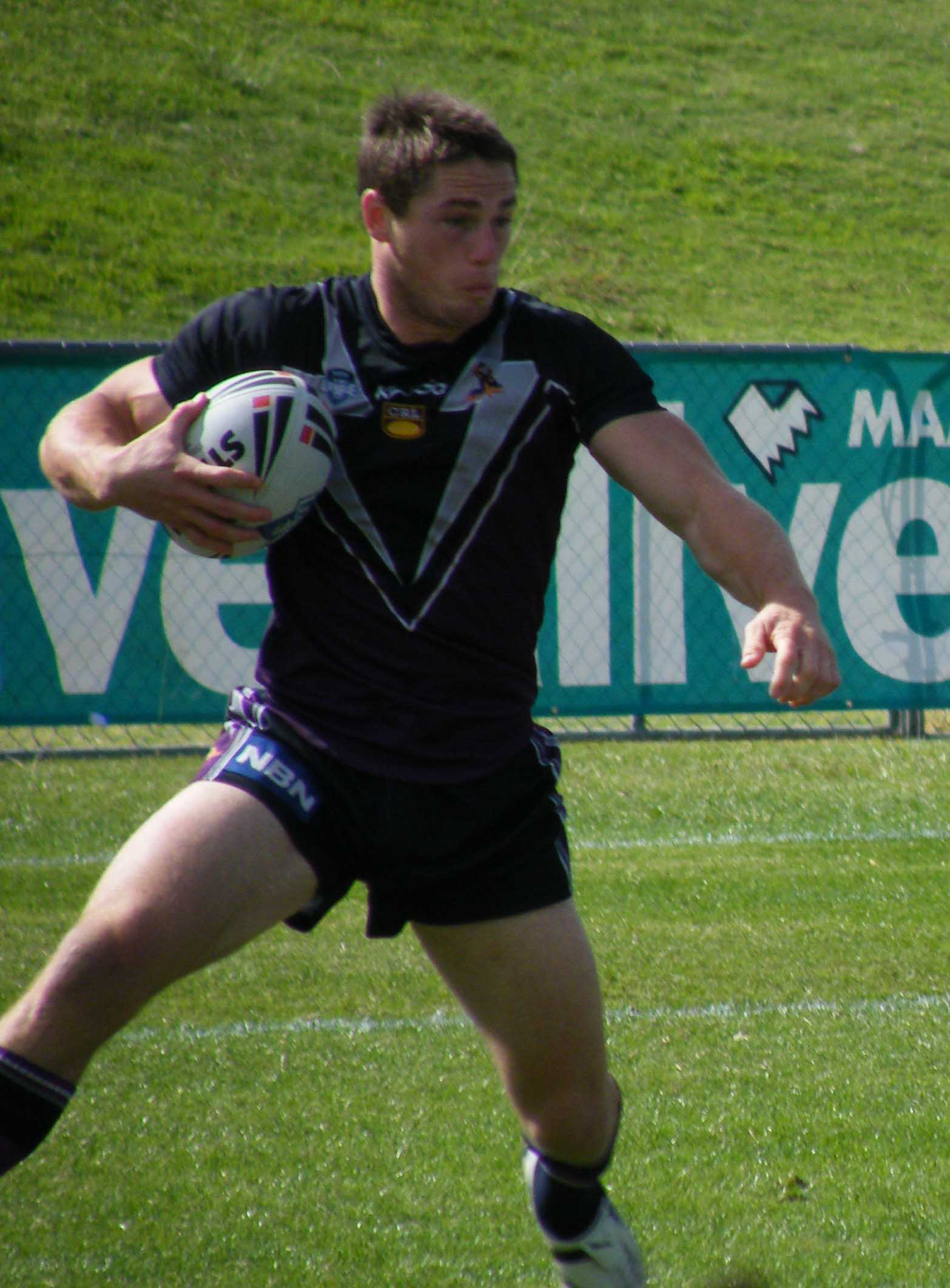

Personal information
- Born: 8 September 1986 (age 39) Innisfail, Queensland, Australia
- Height: 180 cm (5 ft 11 in)
- Weight: 95 kg (14 st 13 lb)

Playing information
- Position: Centre, Wing
Club
Years	Team	Pld	T	G	FG	P
2004	Parramatta Eels	3	0	0	0	0
2007	North Qld Cowboys	1	1	0	0	4
2008–09	Melbourne Storm	8	4	0	0	16
	Total	12	5	0	0	20
Representative
Years	Team	Pld	T	G	FG	P
2008	NSW Residents	1	1	0	0	4
2011	Queensland Residents	1	0	0	0	0
- Source: As of 9 January 2024

Brett Anderson (born 8 September 1986) is an Australian former professional rugby league footballer who last played for the Northern Pride in the Queensland Cup. He plays on the wing and can operate as a centre. He previously played in the National Rugby League for Parramatta Eels, North Queensland Cowboys and Melbourne Storm.

== Early life ==
Anderson was born in Innisfail, Queensland, Australia, and he was educated at Innisfail State High School, where he represented 2003 Australian Schoolboys.

== Playing career ==
Anderson made his first grade debut NRL for Parramatta in 2004. He later made one appearance for North Queensland in 2007. He then signed with Melbourne during the 2008, transferring from Cowboys feeder club Northern Pride.

He made his Melbourne debut in round 10 of the 2008 NRL season against St. George Illawarra. He scored tries in his last three appearances for Melbourne.

He also played 129 games for the Northern Pride in the Queensland Cup, scoring 70 tries; and 10 games for the North Queensland Young Guns, scoring 7 tries. He was a member of the Northern Pride's 2010 Queensland Cup team, and captain of the 2014 Queensland Cup premiership team & the 2014 NRL State Championship, scoring a try in the 2014 Qcup grand final . He came out of retirement to win the Pride's player of the year award in 2018.

Anderson is not related to former Melbourne identities Ben, Chris or Scott.
