= Ryan Stig =

Australian rugby league footballer

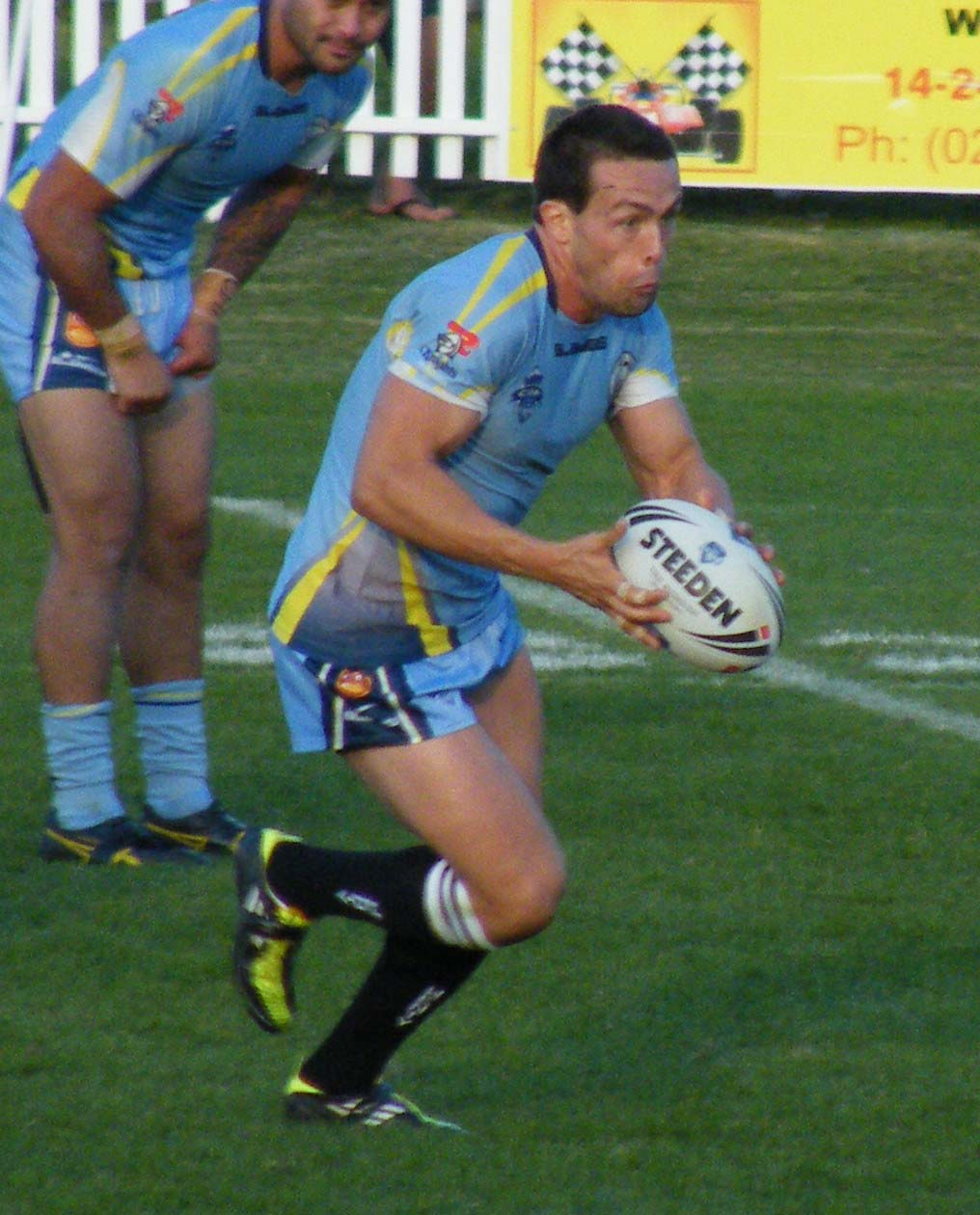
- Stig playing for the Central Coast Centurions in 2011.

Personal information
- Born: 7 November 1989 (age 37) Macksville, New South Wales, Australia
- Height: 179 cm (5 ft 10 in)
- Weight: 89 kg (14 st 0 lb)

Playing information
- Position: Five-eighth, Halfback
Club
Years	Team	Pld	T	G	FG	P
2011	Newcastle Knights	13	1	2	0	8
2019	Limoux Grizzlies	14	2	0	0	8
	Total	27	3	2	0	16
- Source: As of 10 October 2019 (UTC)

Ryan Stig (born 7 November 1989) is an Australian professional rugby league footballer. He plays for the Western Suburbs Rosellas in the local Newcastle competition as a five-eighth and halfback. He previously played for the Newcastle Knights in the National Rugby League and Limoux Grizzlies.

== Background ==
Born in Macksville, New South Wales, Stig played his junior football for the Morpeth Bulls and Nambucca Heads while attending St Philips Christian College, before being signed by the Newcastle Knights.

== Playing career ==
In 2007, Stig played for the Australian Schoolboys. In 2008 and 2009, Stig played for the Newcastle Knights' NYC team. In 2010, Stig joined the Northern Pride in the Queensland Cup. He was injured one game before the Grand Final. In 2011, Stig returned to the Newcastle club signing a one-year contract. In Round 15 of the 2011 NRL season, Stig made his NRL debut for the Newcastle side against the Penrith Panthers after training with the team as 18th man all week. On 4 August 2011, Stig re-signed with the Novocastrians on a two-year contract. In April 2012, Stig developed a blood clot in his eye which ruled him out for the rest of the 2012 NRL season and eventually the 2013 NRL season. This resulted in Stig not being offered a new contract for the 2014 season. In 2018, Stig played for Newcastle's NSW Cup team. After a stint with Limoux in France, Stig returned to Australia and signed for Western Suburbs in the local Newcastle competition. In 2024, Stig played two games for Newcastle's NSW Cup side.

== Same-sex marriage controversy ==
In October 2013, Stig was at the centre of a controversy when he made public comments on Facebook and Twitter expressing opposition towards same-sex marriage. The Newcastle Knights distanced themselves from the issue, claiming "these comments are the personal opinion of Stig, based on his own beliefs and do not reflect those of the Club". A range of past players and others associated with the game publicly spoke out against Stig on his comments.
