= Brenton Bowen =

Australian rugby league footballer

Personal information
- Born: 21 May 1983 (age 42); Cairns, Queensland, Australia

Playing information
- Height: 5 ft 10 in (1.78 m)
- Weight: 12 st 12 lb (82 kg)
- Position: Wing, Fullback
Club
Years	Team	Pld	T	G	FG	P
2003–07	North Qld Cowboys	45	22	0	0	88
2008	Gold Coast Titans	6	2	0	0	8
	Total	51	24	0	0	96
- Relatives: Matt Bowen (cousin); Javid Bowen (nephew)

Brenton Bowen (born 21 May 1983 in Cairns, Queensland) is an Australian former professional rugby league footballer who played in the 2000s. He played for the North Queensland Cowboys from 2003 to 2007 and the Gold Coast Titans in 2008. He is a cousin of Australian international fullback Matt Bowen.

== Career ==
=== Youth ===
Bowen played junior rugby league with Cairns Brothers in 1999 and Abergowrie College (near Ingham, Queensland), in 2000. Bowen represented Queensland in Under-15 and Under-17 schoolboys teams.

=== North Queensland Cowboys ===
Bowen signed with the North Queensland Cowboys making his first grade debut against Manly-Warringah Sea Eagles in March, 2003 and will play out the 2007 season and then join the Gold Coast Titans.

=== Gold Coast Titans ===
On Wednesday 20 June it was announced that Bowen would join the Gold Coast Titans for the 2008 season. After that he went to cowboys feeder team northern pride.

=== Northern Pride/North Queensland Cowboys ===
In 2010 Bowen signed with North Queensland Cowboys feeder club the Northern Pride.
