= Rod Griffin =

PNG international rugby league footballer

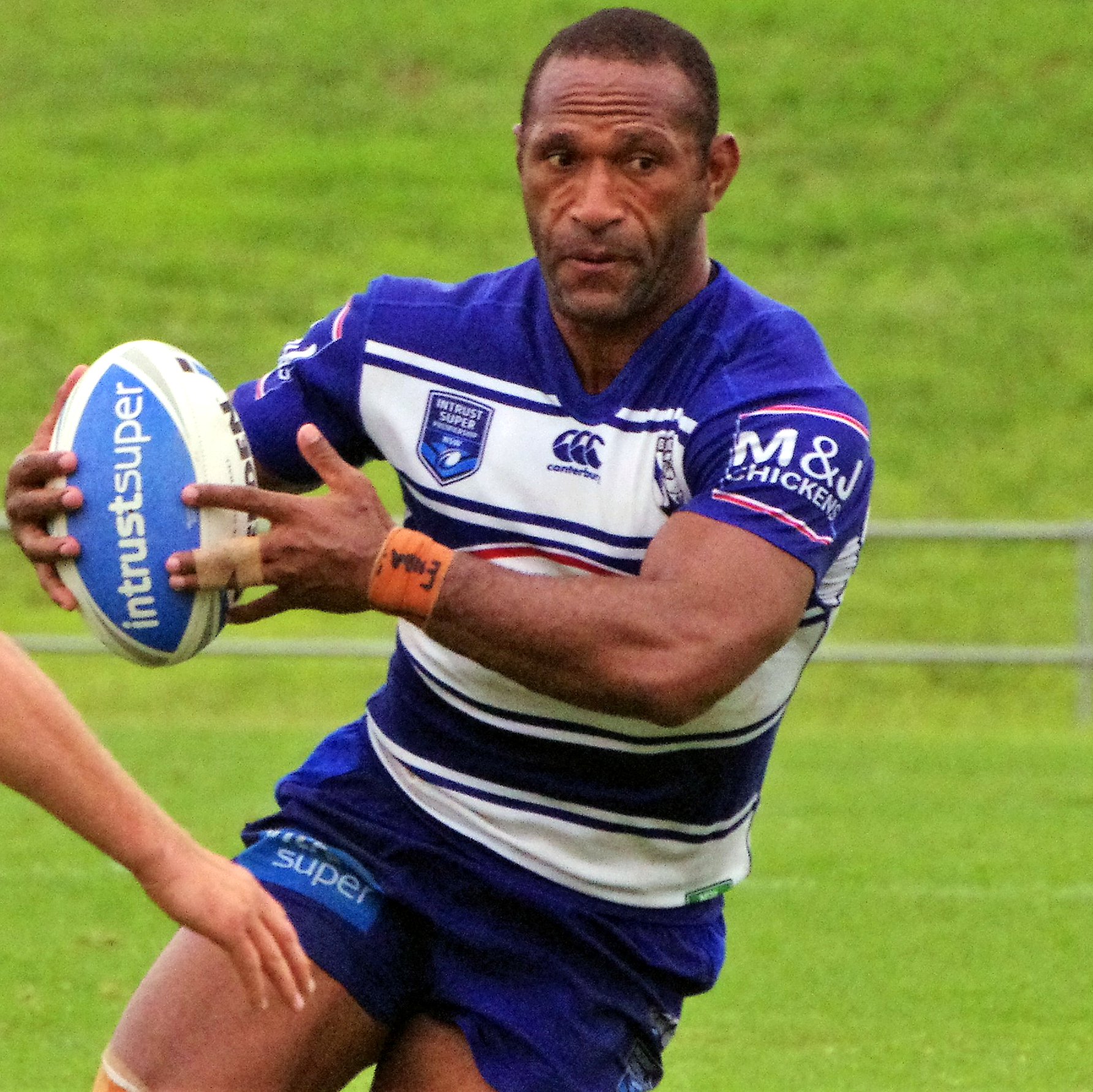

Personal information
- Full name: Rodney Griffin
- Born: 5 January 1987 (age 39) Port Moresby, Papua New Guinea
- Height: 187 cm (6 ft 2 in)
- Weight: 100 kg (15 st 10 lb)

Playing information
- Position: Lock, Second-row, Prop
Representative
Years	Team	Pld	T	G	FG	P
2007–17	Papua New Guinea	13	3	0	0	12
2008–10	PNG Prime Minister's XIII	3	0	0	0	0
2014	Queensland Residents	1	0	0	0	0
- Source: As of 6 January 2024

Rodney Griffin (born 5 January 1987) is a Papua New Guinean professional rugby league footballer who plays as a prop, second-row and lock forward for the Northern Pride in the Queensland Cup. He is a Papua New Guinean international.

== Background ==
Born in Papua New Guinea, Griffin moved to Australia at the age of 3 and played his junior rugby league for the Atherton Roosters, before going into the North Queensland Cowboys' academy system.

== Playing career ==
=== Early career ===
In 2005, Griffin played for the Wynnum Manly Seagulls in the Queensland Cup. In 2006, he moved down to Sydney, New South Wales to play in the Wests Tigers' junior grades.

=== 2007 ===
In October and November, Griffin played 3 games for Papua New Guinea against Wales, and France twice.

=== 2008 ===
In 2008, Griffin returned to the Queensland Cup to play for the Northern Pride. In October and November, he played 3 games for Papua New Guinea at the 2008 Rugby League World Cup against England, New Zealand and Australia.

=== 2009 ===
In 2009, Griffin again played for the Pride, hoping for a contract with the North Queensland Cowboys.

=== 2010 ===
On 19 September, Griffin played in the Pride's 2010 Queensland Cup Grand Final victory over the Norths Devils. In October and November, he played 3 games for Papua New Guinea at the 2010 Rugby League Four Nations against Australia, New Zealand and England.

=== 2011 ===
In 2011, Griffin joined the Tweed Heads Seagulls. On 25 September, he played in the Seagulls' 2011 Queensland Cup Grand Final defeat by the Wynnum Manly Seagulls. This was his third Queensland Cup grand final in a row, after losing with the Pride in 2009 and winning with the Pride in 2010.

=== 2013 ===
After spotting him in the Papua New Guinea camp while assistant coaching the side in 2010, Ipswich Jets co-coaches Ben and Shane Walker signed Griffin to the Ipswich side, after initially missing out on him in 2010. The Walkers stripped 10 kilograms from his frame and moulded him into an 80-minute middle forward capable of performances like 309 metres in 66 minutes in Queensland Cup.

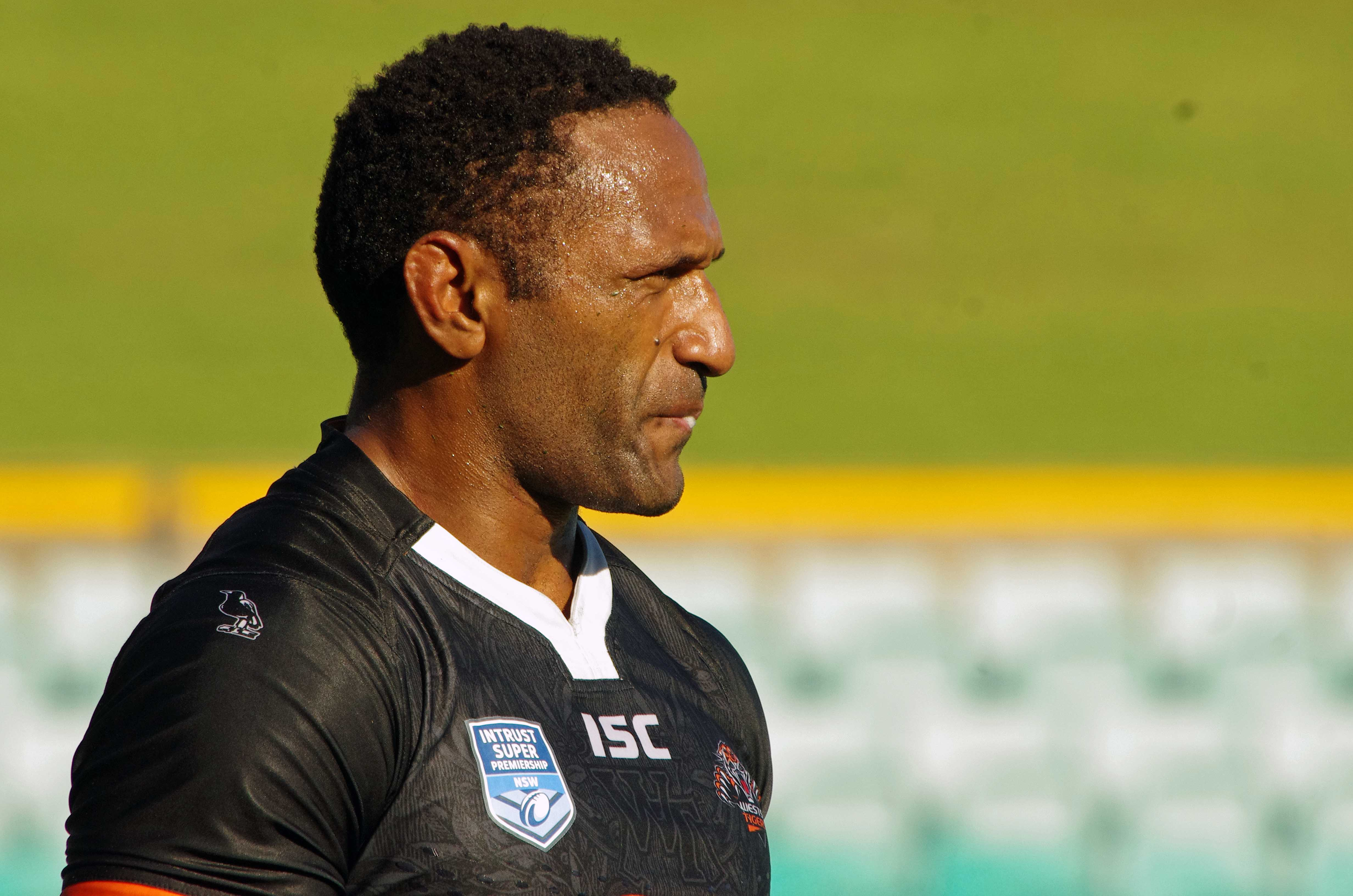
Griffin playing for the Tigers in 2016

=== 2015 ===
In 2015, Griffin did a pre-season with the Brisbane Broncos, but failed to gain a contract. On 27 September, he played in the Jets' 2015 Queensland Cup Grand Final victory over the Townsville Blackhawks. On 4 October, he played in the Jets' 2015 NRL State Championship victory over the Newcastle Knights, scoring a try and setting up a try for winger Marmin Barba. On 13 October, he signed a 1-year contract to return to the Wests Tigers starting in 2016.

=== 2016 ===
On 7 May, Griffin played for Papua New Guinea against Fiji in the 2016 Melanesian Cup. Despite not being able to break into the Tigers' NRL team for 2016, he re-signed with them for 2017.

=== 2017 ===
On 8 February, Griffin was granted a release for his Tigers' contract to join the Canterbury-Bankstown Bulldogs, spending the entire season in the New South Wales Cup. At the end of the season, he represented Papua New Guinea at the 2017 Rugby League World Cup and was named in the NSW Cup Team of the Year.

=== 2018 ===
After two seasons in Sydney without making his NRL debut, Griffin returned to north Queensland, joining the Townsville Blackhawks in the Queensland Cup.
