= David Maiden =

Scotland international rugby league footballer

Personal information
- Born: 7 August 1971 (age 53); Normanton, Queensland, Australia

Playing information
- Height: 183 cm (6 ft 0 in)
- Weight: 92 kg (14 st 7 lb)
- Position: Lock, Centre
Club
Years	Team	Pld	T	G	FG	P
1995	North Qld Cowboys	2	0	0	0	0
1999	Gateshead Thunder	24	8	0	0	32
2000–01	Hull FC	49	14	0	0	56
	Total	75	22	0	0	88
Representative
Years	Team	Pld	T	G	FG	P
1999–01	Scotland	6	2	0	0	8

Coaching information
Club
Years	Team	Gms	W	D	L	W%
2010–12	Northern Pride	71	45	3	23	63

David Maiden (born 7 August 1971) is a former Scotland international rugby league footballer and coach played in the 1990s and 2000s. A lock or centre, he played for the North Queensland Cowboys, Gateshead Thunder and Hull FC.

== Playing career ==
A Ravenshoe junior, Maiden represented the Queensland Residents side in 1994, playing in their game against the New South Wales Residents and their tour of South Africa.

In 1995, Maiden joined the newly established North Queensland Cowboys. In Round 2 of the 1995 ARL season, he made his first grade debut in a 16–34 loss to the Sydney City Roosters, filling in at centre for the suspended Adrian Vowles. Maiden played just two games for the Cowboys before leaving at the end of the season.

From 1996 to 1998, Maiden played for the Cairns Cyclones in the Queensland Cup.

In 1999, Maiden moved to England, joining the Gateshead Thunder in the Super League. He played 24 games for Gateshead that season, scoring eight tries. In October 1999, he represented Scotland in the Triangular Series.

In 2000, Maiden joined Hull F.C. after the club merged with Gateshead. Later that year, he represented Scotland at the 2000 Rugby League World Cup, scoring a try against New Zealand Māori. In July 2001, he again represented Scotland in a 42–20 win over France, scoring a try. At the end of the 2001 season, Maiden left Hull after playing 49 games for the club.

== Statistics ==
=== ARL ===
Season	Team	Matches	T	G	GK %	F/G	Pts
1995	North Queensland	2	0	0	–	0	0
Career totals		2	0	0	–	0	0

=== Super League ===
Season	Team	Matches	T	G	GK %	F/G	Pts
1999	Gateshead	24	8	0	—	0	32
2000	Hull F.C.	23	7	0	—	0	28
2001	Hull F.C.	26	7	0	—	0	28
Career totals		73	22	0	—	0	88

=== International ===
Season	Team	Matches	T	G	GK %	F/G	Pts
1999	Scotland	2	0	0	—	0	0
2000	Scotland	3	1	0	—	0	4
2001	Scotland	1	1	0	—	0	4
Career totals		6	2	0	—	0	8

== Coaching career ==
In 2008, Maiden became an assistant coach of the Northern Pride for their inaugural season in the Queensland Cup. In 2010, he took over as head coach of the club. In his first season in charge, he led the club to their first premiership after defeating the Norths Devils in the Grand Final. He left the club at the end of the 2012 season.

== Post-playing career ==
Since 2015, Maiden has worked as the Queensland Rugby League's major competitions manager.
