= Chris Sheppard (rugby league) =

Australian rugby league footballer

Personal information
- Full name: Christopher Sheppard
- Born: 16 March 1981 (age 45) Mareeba, Queensland, Australia

Playing information
- Height: 181 cm (5 ft 11 in)
- Weight: 92 kg (14 st 7 lb)
- Position: Five-eighth, Halfback
Club
Years	Team	Pld	T	G	FG	P
2001–05	North Qld Cowboys	60	5	0	2	22
2005–06	St. George Illawarra	4	0	0	0	0
2008	North Qld Cowboys	1	0	0	0	0
	Total	65	5	0	2	22

Chris Sheppard (born 16 March 1981) is an Australian former professional rugby league footballer, and former chief executive officer of Queensland Cup club Northern Pride.

Sheppard played at NRL level for the North Queensland Cowboys and the St. George Illawarra Dragons before finishing his career in the Queensland Cup with Northern Pride.

== Background ==
Sheppard was born in Mareeba, Queensland, Australia.

Sheppard played all his early football career for Mareeba in the CDRL competition. Chris was part of the 1999 Gladiators team that won the premiership

== Playing career ==
Sheppard made his NRL first grade debut for the Cowboys in their Round 4 clash against the Penrith Panthers in Cairns on 10 March 2001.

Sheppard took Northern Pride to victory in the 2010 Queensland Cup Final, winning the Duncan Hall Medal for his man-of-the-match performance in his last game before retirement.
