= Ben Laity =

Australian rugby league footballer

Personal information
- Born: 28 November 1983 (age 41); Townsville, Queensland, Australia
- Height: 190 cm (6 ft 3 in)
- Weight: 99 kg (15 st 8 lb)

Playing information
- Position: Prop
Club
Years	Team	Pld	T	G	FG	P
2002	North Qld Cowboys	1	0	0	0	0
- Source: As of 4 November 2018

Ben Laity (born 28 November 1983) is an Australian former rugby league footballer who played for the North Queensland Cowboys in the National Rugby League. He primarily played prop.

== Playing career ==
An Upper Ross Rams junior, Laity joined the North Queensland Cowboys as a teenager, playing for their feeder club, the North Queensland Young Guns, in the Queensland Cup.

In Round 10 of the 2002 NRL season, he made his NRL debut as an 18-year old in the Cowboys' 8–38 loss to the Penrith Panthers. During that season he was selected in the Queensland Residents side. Laity was released by the Cowboys at the end of the 2004 NRL season, having not made any more NRL appearances.

In 2007, Laity joined the Easts Tigers, playing one season for the club before returning north to join the Northern Pride for their first season in the Queensland Cup in 2008. During Laity's six seasons at the club he played 117 games, including starting at prop in the 2009 and 2010 Grand Finals, and was named their Players' Player in 2010. He retired at the end of the 2013 season.

In 2017, he was named at prop in the Northern Pride's Team of the Decade.

== Statistics ==
=== NRL ===
Statistics are correct to the end of the 2002 season

Season	Team	Matches	T	G	GK %	F/G	Pts
2002	North Queensland	1	0	0	—	0	0
Career totals		1	0	0	—	0	0
