= Mark Leafa =

Samoa international rugby league footballer

Mark Vaiao
Personal information
- Born: Mark Leafa; 4 December 1980 (age 44); New Zealand

Playing information
- Position: Prop, Second-row, Lock
Club
Years	Team	Pld	T	G	FG	P
2002	Sydney Roosters	3	0	0	0	3
2004	South Sydney	5	0	0	0	0
2005	Leigh Centurions	28	2	0	0	8
2007–08	Castleford Tigers	40	11	0	0	44
	Total	76	13	0	0	55
Representative
Years	Team	Pld	T	G	FG	P
2000	Samoa	4	0	0	0	0
2011	Queensland Residents	1	0	0	0	0
- Source: As of 5 January 2024

Mark Vaiao (formerly Mark Leafa) (born 4 December 1980) is a former Samoa international rugby league footballer who played as a prop, second-row or lock in the 1990s and 2000s.

He played at club level for the Otahuhu Leopards (junior), Canterbury Bulldogs, Sydney Roosters, Easts Tigers, South Sydney Rabbitohs, Leigh Centurions, Wynnum Manly in the Queensland Cup, Whitehaven, Castleford Tigers and the Norths Devils in the Queensland Cup.

== Playing career ==
=== International career ===
Vaiao played for Samoa at the 2000 World Cup, he was named in the Samoa training squad for the 2008 World Cup but did not make the final side.
