= Michael Bani =

Australian rugby league footballer

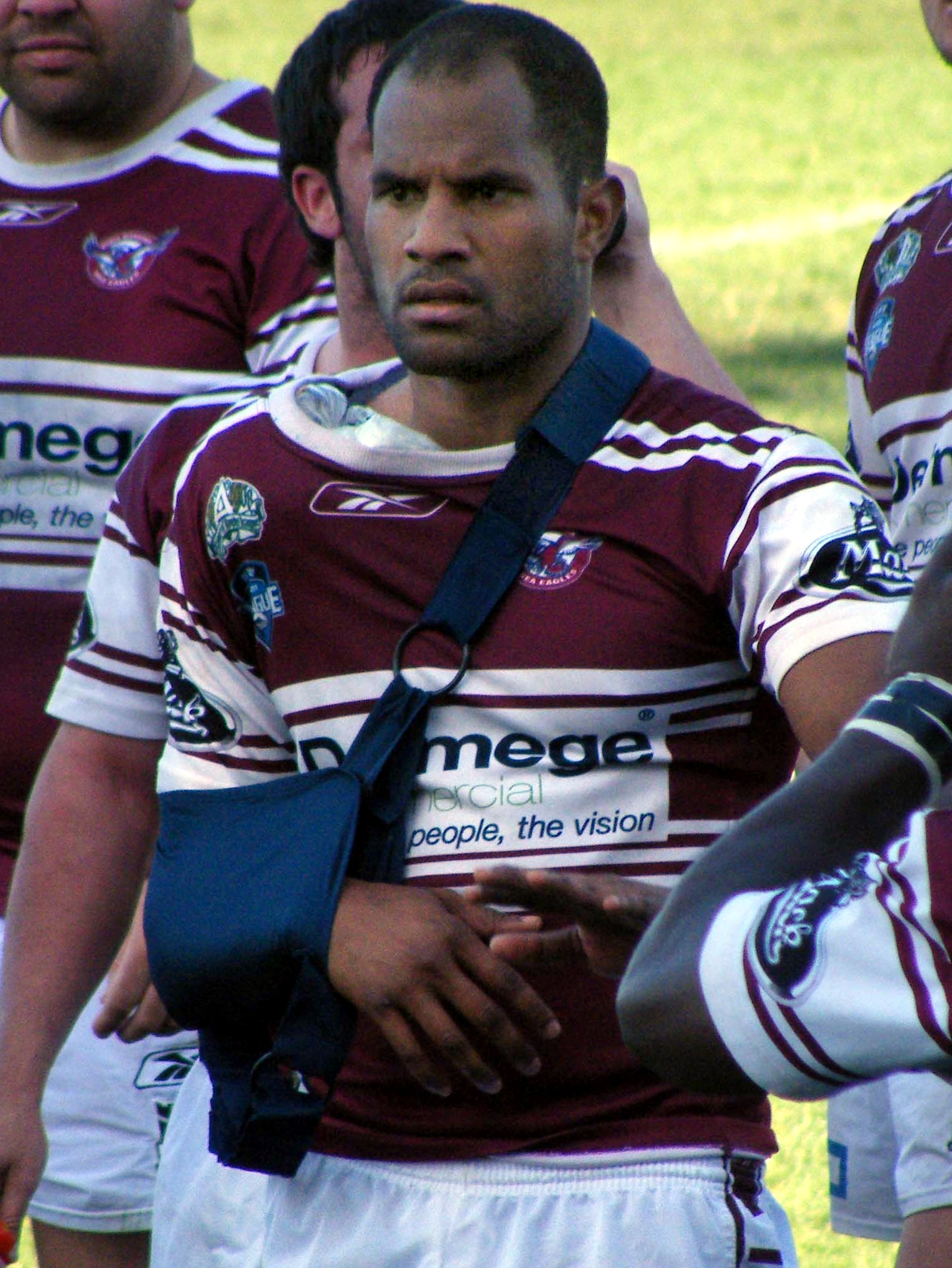

Personal information
- Born: 3 July 1984 (age 42) Thursday Island, Queensland, Australia

Playing information
- Height: 182 cm (6 ft 0 in)
- Weight: 91 kg (14 st 5 lb)
- Position: Fullback, Wing
Club
Years	Team	Pld	T	G	FG	P
2007–09	Manly Sea Eagles	20	8	0	0	32
2009–11	North Qld Cowboys	21	8	0	0	32
	Total	41	16	0	0	64

Michael Bani (born 3 July 1984) is an Indigenous Australia and Papua New Guinea former professional rugby league footballer. He was last contracted to the Canberra Raiders, and has previously played in the National Rugby League (NRL) for the North Queensland Cowboys and the Manly-Warringah Sea Eagles. He played as a fullback, and could also play on the wing.

== Background ==
Bani was born in Thursday Island, Queensland, Australia.

== Playing career ==
Bani was a late starter in rugby league, having first attempted to pursue a career in basketball. At the age of 21 he started playing in Queensland club competitions, before being picked up by the Manly-Warringah Sea Eagles in 2007. He made his NRL debut for Manly that year and made 20 first-grade appearances for the club, scoring eight tries. He joined the North Queensland Cowboys during the 2009 season in a swap that saw Ben Farrar move from the Cowboys to Manly. Bani's contract with the Cowboys expired at the end of the 2011 season. He signed for the Canberra Raiders for 2012. In 2014 he played for the Goulburn Workers.

Bani was named in the Papua New Guinea training squad for the 2008 Rugby League World Cup.
