= Mark Dalle Cort =

Australian rugby league footballer

Personal information
- Born: 19 May 1982 (age 44) Ayr, Queensland, Australia
- Height: 189 cm (6 ft 2 in)
- Weight: 100 kg (15 st 10 lb)

Playing information
- Position: Centre, Lock
Club
Years	Team	Pld	T	G	FG	P
2007–09	Crusaders	83	30	0	0	120
Representative
Years	Team	Pld	T	G	FG	P
2006	Queensland Residents	1	0	0	0	0
2011–13	Italy	0	0	0	0	0
- As of 4 January 2024

Mark Dalle Cort (born 19 May 1982 in Ayr, Queensland) is a former professional rugby league footballer who most recently played for the Northern Pride RLFC in the Queensland Cup he previously played for St George Illawarra Dragons & North Queensland Cowboys in the NRL and the Celtic Crusaders in the Super League.

== Playing career ==
Dalle Cort played for the North Queensland Cowboys and St. George Illawarra Dragons. He spent most of his period at the cowboys injured.

He made his début for the Crusaders in 2007 against the Widnes Vikings. Dalle Cort scored 15 tries in 31 appearances in his début 2007 season.

In August 2009, Dalle Cort, along with five teammates, was ordered to leave the United Kingdom after the UK Border Agency identified breaches to their visa conditions. The Celtic Crusaders cancelled Dalle Cort's contract with immediate effect.

== Representative career ==
Dalle Cort has also represented the Queensland Residents' side.

He has been named in Italy's squad for the 2009 European Cup.
