= Nick Slyney =

Australian rugby league footballer

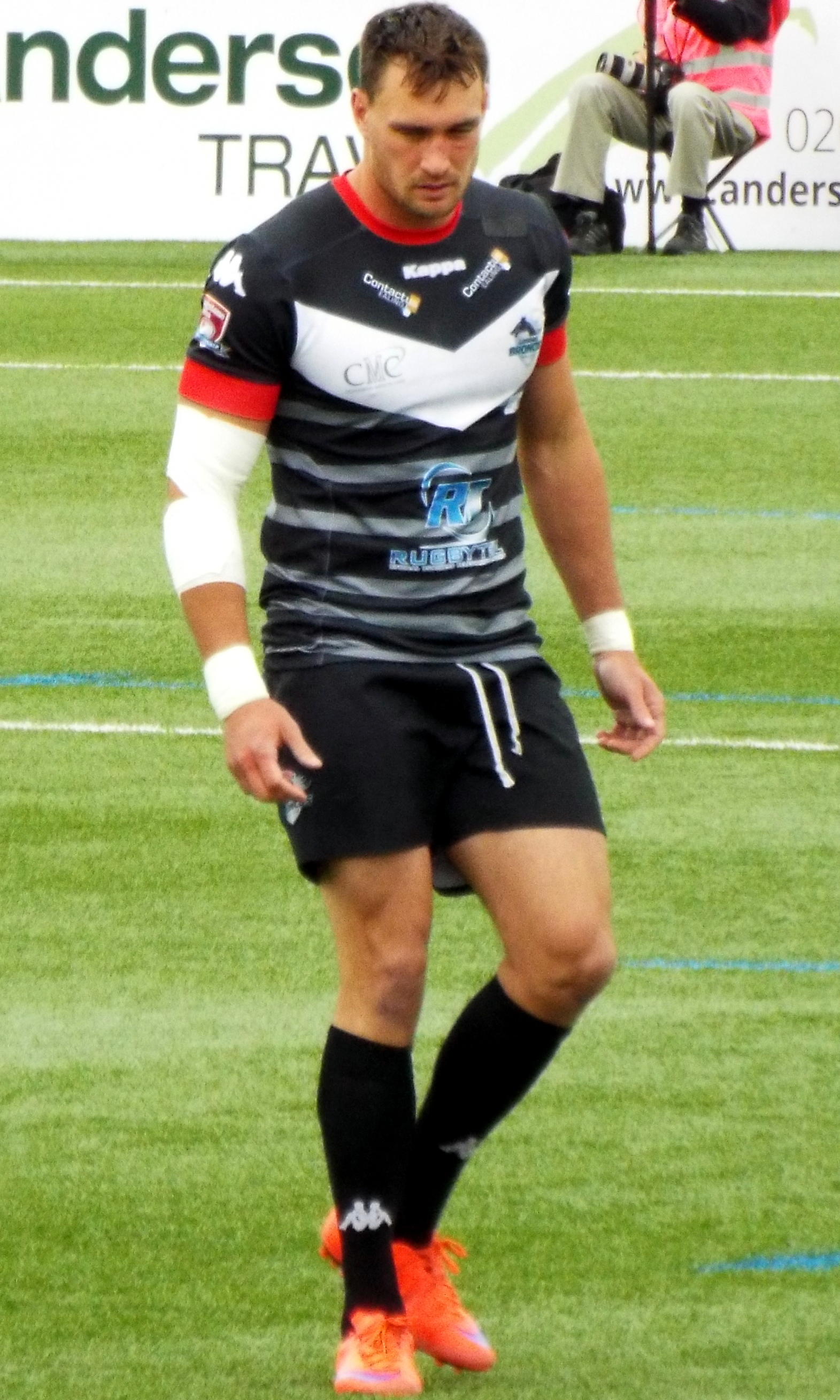

Personal information
- Full name: Nicholas Slyney
- Born: 2 November 1988 (age 38) Atherton, Queensland, Australia
- Height: 189 cm (6 ft 2 in)
- Weight: 100 kg (15 st 10 lb)

Playing information
- Position: Prop, Loose forward
Club
Years	Team	Pld	T	G	FG	P
2008–10	North Qld Cowboys	5	1	0	0	4
2012–13	Brisbane Broncos	6	1	0	0	4
2014–16	London Broncos	57	11	0	0	44
	Total	68	13	0	0	52
Representative
Years	Team	Pld	T	G	FG	P
2011–17	Queensland Residents	3	0	0	0	0
- Source: As of 5 January 2024

Nick Slyney (born 2 November 1988) is an Australian former rugby league footballer who played in the 2000s and 2010s. He played at representative level for the Queensland Residents (captain during 2018), and at club level in the National Rugby League (NRL) for North Queensland Cowboys and the Brisbane Broncos, in the Queensland Cup for Northern Pride RLFC (2009–2010) and the Redcliffe Dolphins, and in the English Super League for the London Broncos (captain during 2015), and as a prop, second-row or lock.

== Background ==
Slyney was born in Atherton, Queensland, Australia.

== Playing career ==
Slyney made his NRL début for North Queensland in round 13 of the 2008 NRL season against the Wests Tigers, and played three NRL matches that season. He subsequently played for the Redcliffe Dolphins in the Queensland Cup, and midway through the 2011 season, signed to return to the NRL to play for the Brisbane Broncos.

In 2012, Slyney was named in the Queensland Residents side.

On 19 June 2014, Slyney signed a two-year contract extension with the London Broncos keeping him at the Broncos until the end of 2016.
