= Clint Amos =

Australian rugby league footballer

Personal information
- Born: 2 September 1983 (age 43) Ballina, New South Wales, Australia

Playing information
- Height: 183 cm (6 ft 0 in)
- Weight: 94 kg (14 st 11 lb)
- Position: Hooker, Lock
Club
Years	Team	Pld	T	G	FG	P
2006	North Qld Cowboys	6	0	0	0	0
2007–08	Gold Coast Titans	21	0	0	0	0
2009–11	North Qld Cowboys	10	0	0	0	0
	Total	37	0	0	0	0
Representative
Years	Team	Pld	T	G	FG	P
2008–10	Queensland Residents	2	0	0	0	0

Clint Amos (born 2 September 1983) is an Australian former professional rugby league footballer. He played as a hooker for North Queensland and the Gold Coast in the NRL.

== Background ==
Amos was born in Ballina, New South Wales, Australia.

== Playing career ==
Amos played junior football for the Burleigh Bears and moved to the North Queensland Cowboys, where he made his first-grade debut in 2006. He then signed for the Gold Coast Titans for its inaugural season in 2007, where he was a regular member of the first-grade team. However, he fell out of the squad in 2008 as Nathan Friend became the side's preferred hooker. He returned to the Cowboys for the 2009 NRL season, signing a two-year deal.

He played for the Northern Pride in the 2011 Queensland Cup.

== Post playing ==
At the end of the 2011 season he retired from playing to become the Cowboys' business development manager.

In 2017, Amos and his wife Hannah were contestants on the thirteenth season of Australian reality series The Block.

== Career highlights ==
- First grade debut: North Queensland v Manly-Warringah Sea Eagles, 18 March 2006 (Round 2) at Dairy Farmers Stadium
