= Jay Aston (rugby league) =

PNG international rugby league footballer

Personal information
- Born: 14 February 1988 (age 38) Brisbane, Australia
- Height: 175 cm (5 ft 9 in)
- Weight: 92 kg (14 st 7 lb)

Playing information
- Position: Hooker
Club
Years	Team	Pld	T	G	FG	P
2009	Northern Pride	0	0	0	0	0
Representative
Years	Team	Pld	T	G	FG	P
2008–09	Papua New Guinea	3	0	0	0	0
- Source: rleague.com As of 15 September 2017

Jay Aston (born 14 February 1988) is a Papua New Guinea International rugby league footballer who played at the 2008 World Cup and the 2009 Pacific Cup. Primarily playing as a hooker, Aston played for the Melbourne Storm in the National Youth Competition in 2008, before joining the Northern Pride in 2009.

== Background ==
Jay Aston was born in Brisbane, Queensland, Australia.
