= Luke Samoa =

Romania international rugby union player

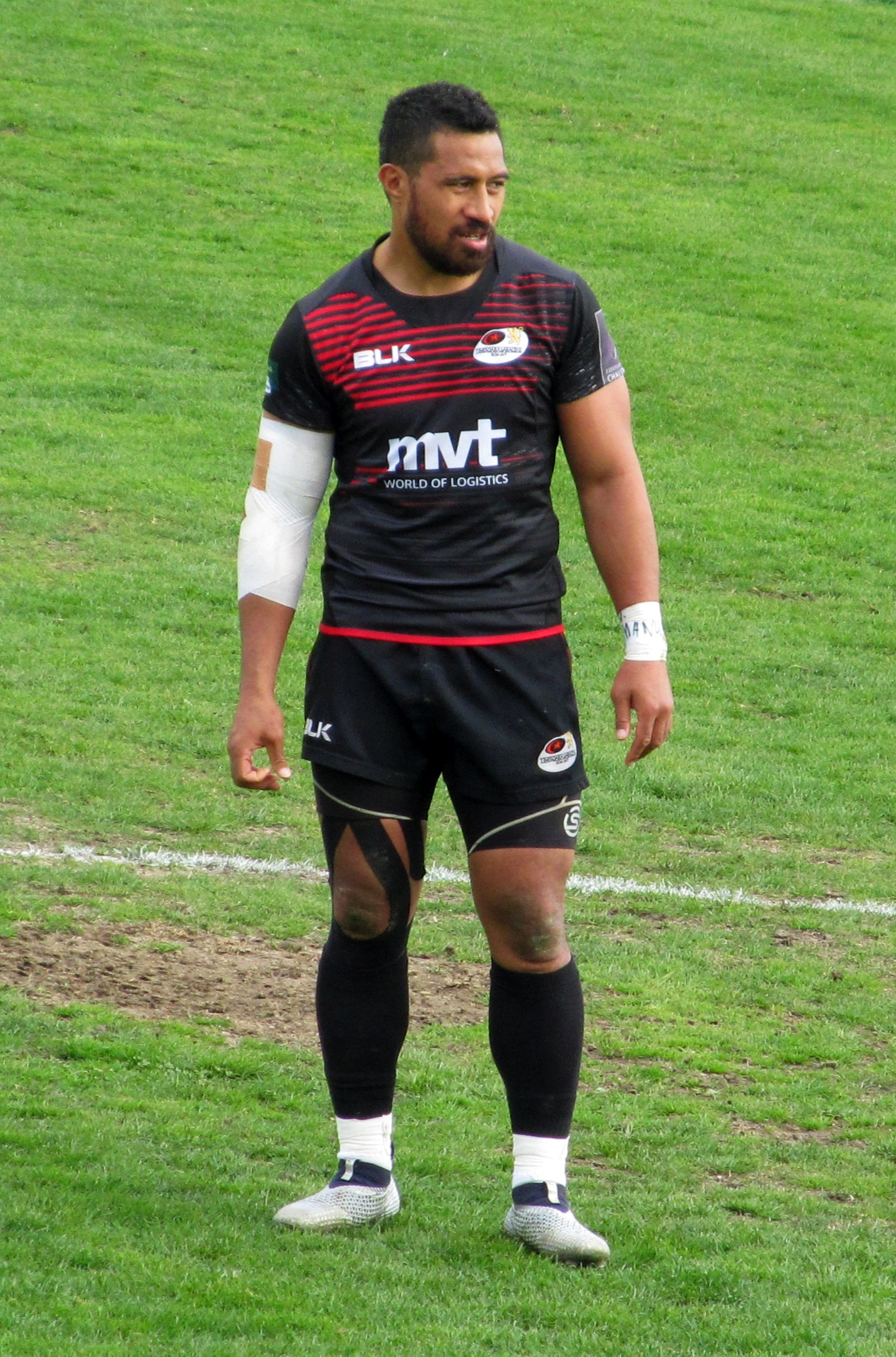
- Luke Samoa playing for Timișoara Saracens during the 2019 Cupa României Final
- Full name: Luke Alec Giovanni Samoa
- Born: 13 May 1988 (age 38) Auckland, New Zealand
- Height: 1.81 m (5 ft 11 1/2 in)
- Weight: 93 kg (14 st 9 lb; 205 lb)

Rugby union career
- Position: Fullback / Flyhalf
- Current team: Timișoara
Senior career
Years	Team	Apps	(Points)
2014–2017	Știința Baia Mare	30	(294)
2014–2015	București Wolves	4	(4)
2017-	Timișoara	36	(319)
- Correct as of 30 May 2019
International career
Years	Team	Apps	(Points)
2017	Romania	5	(14)
- Correct as of 30 May 2019
National sevens team
Years	Team		Comps
2018-	Romania 7`s		3

Luke Samoa (born 13 May 1988) is a New Zealand-born Romanian rugby union football player. He plays in the fullback position for professional SuperLiga clubTimișoara . He also plays for Romania's national team, the Oaks, making his international debut at the 2017 Rugby Europe Championship in a match against the German national rugby union team.

== Career ==
Before joining Timișoara Luke Samoa played Rugby League for Norths Devils in the Intrust Super Cup and, most recently, for Știința Baia Mare.

== Honours ==
Știința Baia Mare

- SuperLiga: 2014

Timișoara

- SuperLiga: 2017/2018
