= Brendon Gibb =

Australian rugby league footballer

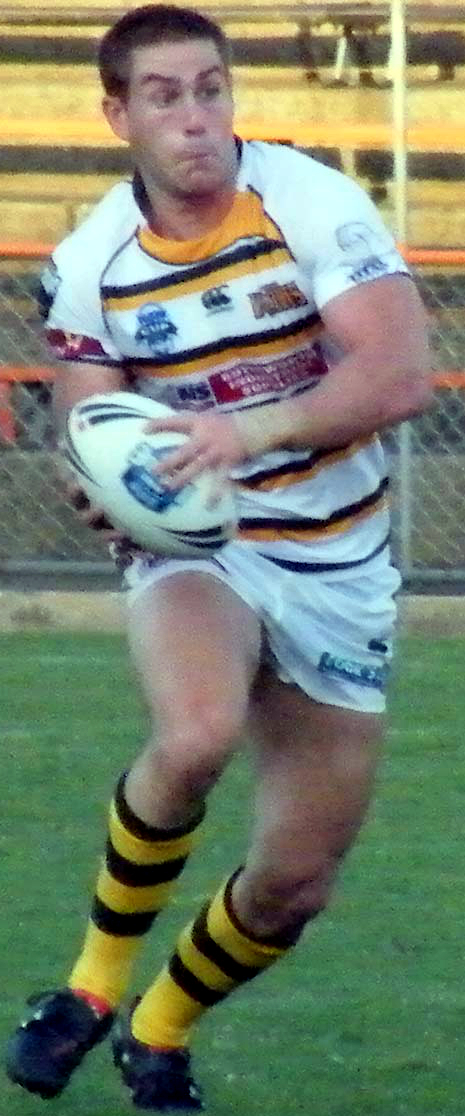

Personal information
- Born: 9 October 1988 (age 38) Gladstone, Queensland, Australia
- Height: 185 cm (6 ft 1 in)
- Weight: 105 kg (16 st 7 lb)

Playing information
- Position: Second-row, Prop
Club
| Years | Team | Pld | T | G | FG | P |
|---|---|---|---|---|---|---|
| 2012 | Brisbane Broncos | 3 | 0 | 0 | 0 | 0 |
Representative
| Years | Team | Pld | T | G | FG | P |
| 2012 | Queensland Residents | 1 | 0 | 0 | 0 | 0 |
- Source: As of 6 January 2024

Brendon Gibb (born 9 October 1988) is an Australian former professional rugby league footballer who played for the Brisbane Broncos in the NRL.

== Background ==
Gibb played at the Gladstone brothers as his junior club and found his favoured position was in the back row.

== Playing career ==
Gibb played for Brisbane in their Under 20's Grand Final loss against Canberra in 2008. He would go on to play for Norths in the Queensland Cup. Before signing with Brisbane, Gibb had a playing spell with Penrith in the lower grades. Gibb made his first grade debut in round 14 of the 2012 NRL season against the Sydney Roosters. In 2012 he was named in the Queensland Residents side. Between 2012 and 2015, Gibb played for Wynnum-Manly in the Queensland Cup. Gibb would then have a three-year spell at Souths Logan.
