= Kaine Manihera =

New Zealand rugby league footballer

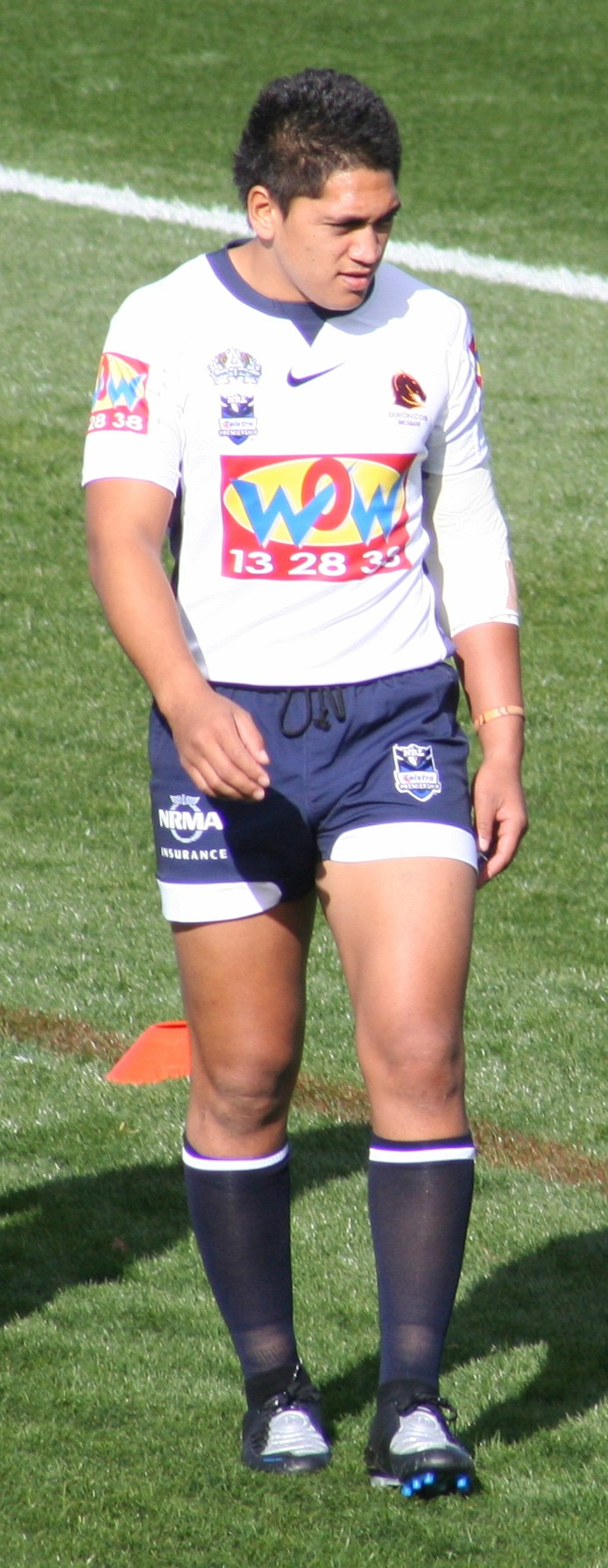
- Manihera while playing for the Broncos in 2008

Personal information
- Born: 25 December 1986 (age 39) Christchurch, New Zealand
- Height: 182 cm (6 ft 0 in)
- Weight: 95 kg (14 st 13 lb)

Playing information
- Position: Wing
Club
Years	Team	Pld	T	G	FG	P
2008	Brisbane Broncos	9	2	0	0	8
Representative
Years	Team	Pld	T	G	FG	P
2005–10	New Zealand Māori	1	1	0	0	4
2008–09	Queensland Residents	2	2	0	0	8
- Source: As of 5 January 2024

Kaine Manihera (born 25 December 1986 in Christchurch, New Zealand) is a former professional rugby league footballer who last played for the Northern Pride in the Queensland Cup. He played on the wing. Married to Hayley Manihera his nephew is kodi Nikorima who is also a professional NRL player for the dolphins.

== Playing career ==
Manihera made his first grade debut for Brisbane against Canberra in round 14 of the 2008 NRL season. Manihera made a handful of appearances for the Brisbane club in the National Rugby League as well as the Burleigh Bears in the Queensland Cup competition. He scored his first try for Brisbane in round 19 of NRL season 2008 against arch-rivals North Queensland in Townsville. In 2010, Manihera played in the Northern Pride's Queensland Cup Grand Final winning team.

== Representative career ==
Manihera played for the New Zealand Māori in 2005 and again in 2010 against England. In 2010 he was the only non-Super League or National Rugby League player to be named in the side.
