= 2012 Northern Pride RLFC season =

Northern Pride
Club information
- Full name: Northern Pride Rugby League Football Club
- Nickname: The Pride
- Colours: Teal, Gold
- Founded: 2007
- Website: northernpride.com.au

Current details
- Ground: Barlow Park, Cairns (seating 1,700, standing 15,000)
- CEO: Chris Sheppard (2011-2013)
- Coach: David Maiden (2010-2012)
- Captain: Ty Williams (2011-2013)
- Competition: Intrust Super Cup
- 2012: 7th
Home colours

Away colours

Records
- Premierships: 2 (2010, 2014)
- Runners-up: 1 (2009)
- Minor premierships: 3 (2013, 2014, 2024)

2012 was the fifth competitive season for the Cairns based Skill360 Northern Pride Rugby League Football Club. They were one of 12 clubs that played in the seventeenth season of the top rugby league competition in Queensland, Australia, the QRL's Intrust Super Cup, with each team playing 11 home games and 11 away games over 26 weeks between March and September. In 2012 the Central Comets were renamed the CQ Capras.

A new feature in this season's draw was 'Country Week', which was introduced after the Pride successfully staged a fixture against Souths Logan in the remote Cape York community of Bamaga last year. This year's Country Week fixture was Round 17, held at Alec Inch Oval in the north-western mining town of Mt Isa.

The QRL scrapped the six-team finals series in favour of a five-team qualifying format.

Channel 9 gained the television broadcast rights, and they agreed to broadcast one game from each of the regional clubs in Cairns, Mackay and Rockhampton. Former broadcast partner, ABC had been unable (or unwilling) to broadcast games from locations outside south-east Queensland, resulting in the relocation of two of the Pride's home semi-finals to Brisbane, where the games were played in front of small crowds at a neutral venue, which disadvantaged the Pride, as well as costing the club a substantial amount of game-day revenue.

The Pride continued to find new ways to interact with fans and the Far North community. The Sea Swift 'Take Pride' program visited remote and regional schools promoting junior rugby league through fun-based rugby league activities and educational presentations. Home games were live-streamed via the Pride website, and from Round 5, away games were streamed as well. Commentary was provided by U-18s coach, Cameron 'Spilla' Miller and WIN TV's Adam Jackson. Pre-game interviews with the coach, half-time interviews with special guests, and post-match wrap-ups with the captain were posted on YouTube under the title 'Pride TV'. A e-newsletter was produced, called 'Pride Pulse' and Brett Anderson wrote a weekly column for the Cairns Post titled 'Pride Insider'.

The Pride had a shaky start to the season, with four straight losses in the first six rounds. One of their problems was the halves combination, having tried Robert Lui with Shaun Nona, then Ryan Ghietti with Nona, then Ghietti with Mitch Seri, and finally Ghietti with Ty Williams. Moving Williams to five-eighth and taking Rod Jensen off the bench and starting him at centre helped the Pride win ten of the next sixteen rounds. However poor ball handling, a poor completion rate and poor execution saw them lose matches to lower placed teams. In Round 18 they lost to bottom placed Sunshine Coast Sea Eagles who had only won two games so far. Despite a few good wins in the last few rounds, the Pride finished the season in seventh place, missing out on a finals appearance for the first time in their short history.

At the end of the season, Head Coach David Maiden resigned, while fullback Chey Bird, who scored 572 points in 94 appearances for the Pride, retired along with former North Queensland Cowboys star Rod Jensen, who scored 36 tries in 69 games for the club, second on the Pride's all-time try scorer list.

Northern Pride 2012 ISC video highlights (7 videos).

== 2012 Season – Skill360 Northern Pride ==
- Competition: Intrust Super Cup
- Sponsor: Skill360

=== Staff ===
==== Coaches/Trainers ====
- Coach: David Maiden
- Assistant coach: David Westley
- Mal Meninga Cup U-18s coach:
- Cyril Connell Cup U-16s coach:
- Strength and conditioning coach: Scott Callaghan

==== Captains ====
- Ty Williams
- Brett Anderson (Pre-season trial match, and Rounds 20 to 22)

==== Managers ====
- Operations manager: Sheron McDougall
- Team manager: Rob White
- Club captain: Ben Laity
- Business development manager: Brock Schaefer
- Chief executive: Chris Sheppard
- Chairman: Bob Fowler
- Board of Directors: Nigel Tillett, David Smith, Craig Meiklejohn, Anthony Mirotsos, Bill Phillips, Bob Fowler.

== 2012 squad ==
The Pride used 34 players this season. Nineteen players from last year signed with the club again, and six of the Cowboys allocation players from last year were assigned to the Pride again this year. Nine new players made their debut this season; seven were new signings (Brent Oosen, Ethan Lowe, Justin Castellaro, Maddie Oosen, Mitchell Seri, Saia Makisi and Scott Gibson), and two were new Cowboys allocation players (Robert Lui* and Wayne Ulugia*).

Ty Williams (c)
Alex Starmer
Ben Fitzpatrick
Ben Laity
Ben Spina
Brent Oosen
Brett Anderson
Chey Bird
Davin Crampton
Ethan Lowe
Hezron Murgha
Jamie Frizzo

Jason Roos
Justin Castellaro
Luke Saunders
Maddie Oosen
Mark Dalle Cort
Mitchell Seri
Noel Underwood
Rod Jensen
Ryan Ghietti
Saia Makisi
Scott Gibson
Shaun Nona

Trial

Aaron Binawel
Billy McConachie
Francis Mosby
Jamie Kerwick
Joel Marama
Justin Dolan
Masi Nona
Rickki Sutherland
Rohan Schultz
Troyson Bassani
Wees Nawia

North Queensland Cowboys allocation

Blake Leary*
Cory Paterson*
James Segeyaro*
Joel Riethmuller*
Kalifa Faifai Loa*
Luke Harlen*
Ricky Thorby*
Robert Lui*
Scott Bolton*
Wayne Ulugia*

Allocated but did not play for the Pride in 2012:
Aaron Payne
Ashley Graham
Brenton Bowen
Dallas Johnson
James Tamou
Matthew Bowen
Ray Thompson

=== 2012 player gains ===
Player	From League	From Club	Notes
Jamie Frizzo	Retirement	Northern Pride	From retirement
Ethan Lowe	NRL Telstra Premiership	Sydney Roosters	
Saia Makisi	Intrust Super Cup	Souths Logan Magpies	
Joel Marama	BRL FOGS Cup	Wests Panthers	
Maddie Oosen	CDRL	Southern Suburbs	
Mitch Seri	TDRL	Herbert River Crushers	
Justin Castellaro	TDRL	Herbert River Crushers	
Scott Gibson	TDRL	Herbert River Crushers	
Rohan Shulz	Mt Isa RL	Trial	
Billy McConnachie	Mt Isa RL	Trial	

=== Player losses after 2011 season ===
Player	To League	To Club
Mark Cantoni	French RLF Elite One Championship	Baroudeurs de Pia XIII (Pia Donkeys)
Sheldon Powe-Hobbs	NRL Telstra Premiership	Melbourne Storm
Aidan Day	Intrust Super Cup	Mackay Cutters
Brenton Bowen	Illness	
Lancen Joudo	Released	
Mick Wilson	Released	

==== Cowboys no longer allocated to the Pride ====
Player	To League	To Club
Clint Amos*	Retired	
Jack Cooper*		
Michael Bani*	NRL Telstra Premiership	Canberra Raiders
Will Tupou*	allocated to	Mackay Cutters

=== 2012 season launch ===
- Pre-Season Training: 22 November 2011
- Pre-Season Boot Camp: Djarragun Farm in the Goldsborough Valley – Friday 16-Sunday 18 December 2011. 110 players and coaching staff from all three squads (Intrust Super Cup, Under-18 and Under-16) attended the boot camp. Video Highlights.
- Photo Shoot: 7 January 2012, Family Day and team photo shoot at Rainforeststation, Kuranda.
- Season launch: 31 January 2012, Barlow Park.
- Meet the Players: 10:00 am, 18 February 2012, Hip Pocket Work Wear, Mulgrave Road, Cairns.
- Jersey Launch: 9 March 2012, Stockland Shopping Centre, Earlville.

==== 2012 player awards ====
- Sea Swift Most improved player: Brent Oosen
- Sea Swift Photographers Choice Award: Scott Gibson
- Sea Swift Season Members Player of the Year: Alex Starmer
- Sea Swift Best Back: Brett Anderson
- Sea Swift Best Forward: Ben Spina
- Sea Swift Players' Player: Ben Spina
- John O'Brien Perpetual Club Person of the Year: O'Kane/Wilson Family
- Skill360 Australia Northern Pride Player of the Year: Ben Spina
- QRL Carbine Club Rookie of the Year: Ethan Lowe

==== 2012 player records ====
- Most Games: Ben Spina (22), Ethan Lowe (22).
- Most Tries: Brett Anderson (14).
- Most Points: Brett Anderson (56).

==== Players signed to first-tier teams ====
Player	To League	To Club
Ethan Lowe	NRL Telstra Premiership	North Queensland Cowboys

=== 2012 Jerseys ===
2012 Home

2012 Away

2011 NAIDOC Week (Round 16)

2012 Country Week (Round 17, Mt Isa)

=== Trial Matches ===
Pre-season Trial 1
Saturday
11 February 2012
17:00 AEST (UTC+10)

NYC NQ Cowboys U-20s	30 – 22	Northern Pride
Tries: ? Goals: ?	Cairns Post Preview; Pride Report	Tries: 2 Scott Gibson; 1 Saia Makisi; 1 Ryan Ghietti; 1 Jamie Frizzo; 1 Chey Bird; Goals: 1 Mitchell Seri; 1 Ty Williams; 1 Chey Bird

Jack Manski Oval
(Brothers Townsville, Golf Links Drive, Kirwan, QLD)

Skill360 Northern Pride: 1. Ty Williams – FB 2. Hezron Murgha – WG 3. Saia Makisi – CE 4. Davin Crampton – CE 5. Scott Gibson – WG 6. Ryan Ghietti – FE 7. Mitchell Seri – HB 8. Luke Harlen* – PR 9. Jason Roos – HK 10. Ben Laity – PR 11. Luke Saunders – SR 12. Jamie Frizzo – SR 13. Ben Spina – LK
Unlimited Interchange: 14. Maddie Oosen, 15. Chey Bird, 16. Rod Jensen, 17. Ethan Lowe, 18. Ricky Thorby*, 19. Shaun Nona, 20. Justin Castellaro, 21. Masi Nona.
* = Cowboys allocation.
NYC U-20s Cowboys: ?

Pre-season Trial 2
Saturday
18 February 2012
19:00 AEST (UTC+10)

Northern Pride	94 – 0	FNQ Indigenous All Stars
Tries: Brett Anderson 3 Jamie Kerwick 3 Francis Mosby 2 Brent Oosen 1 Ben Fitzpatrick 1 Wees Nawia 1 Maddie Oosen 1 Justin Castellaro 1 Aaron Binawel 1 Smith 1 Rohan Schultz 1 Goals: Shaun Nona 15	Cairns Post Preview; Video Report	Tries: Goals:

Barlow Park
(Severin Street, Parramatta Park, QLD)

Skill360 Northern Pride: 1. Ben Fitzpatrick – FB 2. Francis Mosby – WG 3. Brett Anderson (c) – CE 4. Rickki Sutherland – CE 5. Justin Castellaro – WG 6. Troyson Bassani – FE 7. Shaun Nona – HB 8. Mark Dalle Cort – PR 9. Maddie Oosen – HK 10. Alex Starmer – PR 11. Justin Dolan – SR 12. Joel Marama – SR 13. Brent Oosen – LK
Unlimited Interchange: 14. Jamie Kerwick, 15. Brenton Bowen*, 16. Wees Nawia, 17. Billy McConachie, 18. Rohan Schultz, 19. Aaron Binawe.
* = Cowboys allocation.
FNQ Indigenous All Stars: Karl Adams, Hayden Brown, Maurice Burke, Shemiah Chinfat, Darren Cobb, Stanley Dai, Peter English, Denley Foster, Dane Furphy, Jovan Gibson, David Grainer, Miles Kerindun, Elron Lawrence, Fitzroy Lawrence, Daryl Lightning, Josh Mene, Densen Misi, Milton Mossman, Charles Murgha, Tim Oberleuter, Clargie Saltmere, Steve Singleton, Santoi Thaiday, Peter Tuccandidgee.
- Note: Anderson, Dalle Cort and Starmer were the only Pride regulars in the side, with train and trial and CDRL players filling the other positions.

Pre-season Trial 3
Saturday
25 February 2012
19:30 AEST (UTC+10)

Mackay Cutters	CANCELLED	Northern Pride
	Pride Preview; Cairns Post Report; Video Report

Darryl Bourke Oval
(Mills Avenue, Moranbah, QLD)

Skill360 Northern Pride: CANCELLED
* = Cowboys allocation. Cory Paterson*, Kalifa Faifai Loa*, Luke Harlen*, Joel Riethmuller*, Ricky Thorby* and James Segeyaro*.
- Note: The Pride's plane was struck by lightning twice en route to Moranbah. After the first strike the Skytrans charter flight turned back to Cairns, when the plane sustained a damaged windscreen as a result of a second strike.

Pre-season Trial 4
Tuesday
28 February 2012
18:30 AEST (UTC+10)

Northern Pride 'A'	v	Northern Pride 'B'
Tries: ? Goals: ?		Tries: ? Goals: ?

Barlow Park
(Severin Street, Parramatta Park, QLD)

Skill360 Northern Pride: All 33 players in the current squad played in this scratch match.
- Note: After the Moranbah trial game was cancelled, coach David Maiden arranged an in-house scratch match.

=== Intrust Super Cup matches ===
ROUND 1: Intrust Super Cup 2012

Saturday
10 March 2012
17:30 AEST (UTC+10)

Northern Pride	22 – 14	Ipswich Jets
Tries: Hezron Murgha 1 Brett Anderson 2 Ethan Lowe 1 Ben Spina 1 Goals: Shaun Nona 1	Pride Report; QRL Report; Video Preview; Press Conference; Video Highlights	Tries: 1 Ramon Filipine; 1 Michael Fisher Goals: 3 Brendon Lindsay

Barlow Park
(Severin Street, Parramatta Park, QLD)
Referee: Nick Kalpakidis

Skill360 Northern Pride: 1. Ty Williams (c) – FB 2. Hezron Murgha – WG 3. Brett Anderson – CE 4. Davin Crampton – CE 22. Kalifa Faifai Loa* – WG 6. Shaun Nona – FE 18. Robert Lui* – HB 20. Luke Harlen* – PR 9. Jason Roos – HK 10. Ben Laity – PR 8. Scott Bolton* – SR 12. Jamie Frizzo – SR 13. Ben Spina – LK
Interchange: 11. Ethan Lowe, 14. Rod Jensen, 16. Noel Underwood, 17. Ricky Thorby*.
* = Cowboys allocation.
Unavailable: Ryan Ghietti (hand).
Ipswich Jets: 1. Javarn White, 2. Ramon Filipine, 3. Donald Malone, 4. Brendan Marshall, 5. Jarrod McInally, 6. Brendon Lindsay, 7. Todd Riggs, 8. Tyson Lofipo, 9. Michael Fisher, 10. Rowan Winterfield, 11. Nathaniel Neale, 12. Lorenzo Maafu, 13. Sam Martin.
Interchange: 14. Ian Lacey, 15. Luke Page, 16. Smith Samau, 17. Kurtis Lingwoodock.
Coaches: Ben Walker and Shane Walker.
- Note: Game played in very wet conditions.
  This was the Pride debut for Ethan Lowe (Pride Player 078) and North Queensland Cowboys allocation player Robert Lui* (Pride Player 077).

Position	Round 1 – 2012	P	W	D	L	For	Against	Diff	Pts
5	Northern Pride	1	1	0	0	22	14	+8	2

ROUND 2: Intrust Super Cup 2012

Saturday
17 March 2012
18:00 AEST (UTC+10)

Mackay Cutters	6 – 14	Northern Pride
Tries: Grant Rovelli 1 Goals: Michael Comerford 1	Pride Report; Pride Report; QRL Report; Video Preview; Press Conference; Video Highlights	Tries: 1 Ethan Lowe; 1 Noel Underwood; Goals: 3 Shaun Nona

Virgin Australia Stadium
(Bridge Road, South Mackay, QLD)
Referee: Clayton Sharpe

Skill360 Northern Pride: 1. Ty Williams (c) – FB 2. Hezron Murgha – WG 3. Brett Anderson – CE 4. Davin Crampton – CE 5. Kalifa Faifai Loa* – WG 6. Shaun Nona – FE 7. Robert Lui* – HB 8. Scott Bolton* – PR 9. Jason Roos – HK 10. Ben Laity – PR 11. Ethan Lowe – SR 20. Cory Paterson* – SR 13. Ben Spina – LK
Interchange: 14. Rod Jensen, 15. Luke Harlen* 16. Noel Underwood, 17. Ricky Thorby*
* = Cowboys allocation.
Unavailable: Chey Bird (ankle), Ryan Ghietti (hand).
Mackay Cutters: 1. David Milne, 2. Bureta Faraimo, 3. Moses Pangai, 4. Michael Comerford, 5. Michael Thomas, 6. Grant Rovelli, 7. Michael Morgan, 8. Lewis Balcomb, 9. Neil Budworth, 10. Dane Hogan, 11. Jason Schirnack, 12. Tyson Martin, 13. Jardine Bobongie.
Interchange: 14. Kelvin Nielsen, 15. Chris Gesch, 16. Zac Dalton, 17. Sam Hoare, 18. Luke Young.
Coach: Anthony Seibold.
- Note: Game played in heavy rain and poor conditions.

Position	Round 2 – 2012	P	W	D	L	For	Against	Diff	Pts
4	Northern Pride	2	2	0	0	36	20	+16	4

ROUND 3: Intrust Super Cup 2012

Saturday
24 March 2012
15:00 AEST (UTC+10)

Easts Tigers	30 – 22	Northern Pride
Tries: Ryan Tongia 3 Eddie Tautali 2 Kenny Bromwich 1 Goals: Cody Walker 3	QRL Report; Pride Report; Video Preview; Video Highlights	Tries: 3 Brett Anderson; 1 Davin Crampton Goals: 3 Shaun Nona

Langlands Park
(Stones Corner, Brisbane, QLD)
Referee: Robert Gallacher

Skill360 Northern Pride: 1. Ty Williams (c) – FB 2. Hezron Murgha – WG 3. Brett Anderson – CE 4. Davin Crampton – CE 5. Kalifa Faifai Loa* – WG 6. Ryan Ghietti – FE 19. Shaun Nona – HB 8. Luke Harlen* – PR 9. Jason Roos – HK 10. Ben Laity – PR 11. Ethan Lowe – SR 12. Cory Paterson* – SR 13. Ben Spina – LK
Interchange: 14. Rod Jensen, 15. Jamie Frizzo 16. Noel Underwood, 17. Luke Saunders.
* = Cowboys allocation.
Unavailable: Chey Bird (ankle), Scott Bolton* (knee), Robert Lui* (stood down by the Cowboys after pleading guilty to assaulting his girlfriend).
Easts Tigers: 1. Corey Thompson, 2. Eddie Tautali, 3. Shane Neumann (c), 4. Lance Morris, 5. Ryan Tongia, 6. Cody Walker, 7. Isaac Kaufmann, 8. Liam McDonald, 9. Geoff Holcombe, 10. Matt Zgrajewski, 11. Steven Thorpe, 12. Wiremu Ratana, 13. Leon Panapa.
Interchange: 14. Mitchell Garbutt, 15. Kenny Bromwich, 17. Luke Kelly, 19. Shea Moylan.
Coach: Troy McCarthy.
- Note: This was the Pride's 100th match in the Queensland Cup (65 wins, 33 losses and 2 drawn matches).
  It was also Hezron Murgha's 50th match for the Pride.

Position	Round 3 – 2012	P	W	D	L	For	Against	Diff	Pts
4	Northern Pride	3	2	0	1	58	50	+8	4

ROUND 4: Intrust Super Cup 2012

Saturday
31 March 2012
17:30 AEST (UTC+10)

Northern Pride	22 – 32	Souths Logan Magpies
Tries: Hezron Murgha 2 Kalifa Faifai Loa* 2 Goals: Mitchell Seri 3	QRL Report; Pride Report; Video Preview; Press Conference	Tries: 2 Walter Imo; 2 Ben Cronin; 1 Dane Phillips; 1 Darcy Wright; Goals: 4 Josh Damen

Barlow Park
(Severin Street, Parramatta Park, QLD)
Referee: Nick Kalpakidis

Skill360 Northern Pride: 1. Ty Williams (c) – FB 2. Hezron Murgha – WG 3. Brett Anderson – CE 4. Davin Crampton – CE 5. Kalifa Faifai Loa* – WG 6. Ryan Ghietti – FE 7. Mitchell Seri – HB 16. Noel Underwood – PR 9. Jason Roos – HK 10. Ben Laity – PR 11. Ethan Lowe – SR 12. Cory Paterson* – SR 13. Ben Spina – LK
Interchange: 8. Luke Harlen*, 14. Rod Jensen, 15. Jamie Frizzo 17. Luke Saunders.
* = Cowboys allocation.
Unavailable: Chey Bird (ankle), Scott Bolton* (knee).
Souths Logan Magpies: 1. Josh Damen, 2. Walter Imo, 3. Dallas Anderson, 4. Matt Templeman, 5. Wade Liddell, 6. Ben Cronin, 7. Dane Phillips, 8. Dario Esposito, 9. Dan Humphreys, 10. Matt Cameron, 11. Andrew Edwards, 12. Sam Gardel, 13. Phil Dennis (c).
Interchange: 14. James Tutuila, 15. Darcy Wright, 16. Cadence Matene, 17. Simanu Crichton.
Coach: Mark Beaumont.
- Note: This was the Ben Laity's 100th appearance for the Pride, having only missed one match since the club formed. It was also his 174th Queensland Cup appearance (having previously played for the North Queensland Young Guns and Easts Tigers).
  This was the first time Souths Logan Magpies won at Barlow Park, having lost all four previous appearances (2008–2011).
  This was the Pride debut for Mitchell Seri (Pride Player 079).

Position	Round 4 – 2012	P	W	D	L	For	Against	Diff	Pts
7	Northern Pride	4	2	0	2	80	82	−2	4

ROUND 5: Intrust Super Cup 2012

Thursday
5 April 2012
19:00 AEST (UTC+10)

CQ Capras	28 – 18	Northern Pride
Tries: Sailosi Vatubua 2 Alan Rothery 1 Cheyenne Motu 1 Tim Glasby 1 Goals: Tyron Cranston 4	Pride Preview; Pride Report; QRL Report	Tries: 2 Brett Anderson; 1 Davin Crampton; 1 Jamie Frizzo Goals: 1 Mitchell Seri

Browne Park
(Wandal, Rockhampton, QLD)
Referee: Peter Gough

Skill360 Northern Pride: 1. Ty Williams (c) – FB 4. Davin Crampton – WG 3. Brett Anderson – CE 19. Chey Bird – CE 5. Kalifa Faifai Loa* – WG 6. Ryan Ghietti – FE 7. Mitchell Seri – HB 17. Luke Harlen* – PR 9. Jason Roos – HK 10. Ben Laity – PR 11. Ethan Lowe – SR 16. Luke Saunders – SR 13. Ben Spina – LK
Interchange: 14. Rod Jensen, 15. Noel Underwood, 18. Jamie Frizzo, 22. Mark Dalle Cort.
* = Cowboys allocation.
Unavailable: Scott Bolton* (knee).
CQ Capras: 1. Reece Baker, 2. Tyron Cranston, 3. Brent Williams, 4. Mitch Zornig, 5. Sailosi Vatubua, 6. Casey Bromilow, 7. Jon Tavinor, 8. Tim Glasby (c), 9. Cheyenne Motu, 10. James Taputu-Crombie, 11. Alan Rothery, 12. Ben Faulkner, 13. Gavin Hiscox.
Interchange: 14. Josh Tanner, 15. Dave McLellan, 16. John Clayton, 17. Russell Webber.
Coach: John Harbin.
- Note: This was the Pride's first Thursday night match

Position	Round 5 – 2012	P	W	D	L	For	Against	Diff	Pts
5	Northern Pride	5	2	0	3	98	110	−12	4

ROUND 6: Intrust Super Cup 2012

Saturday
14 April 2012
14:00 AEST (UTC+10)

Tweed Heads Seagulls	24 – 22	Northern Pride
Tries: Tom Merritt 3 Matt Carbutt 1 Goals: Brad Davis 4	Pride Report; Pride Report; QRL Report	Tries: 1 Davin Crampton; 1 Scott Gibson; 1 Ty Williams; 1 Ben Spina; Goals: 3 Chey Bird

Piggabeen Sports Complex
(Caramar Drive, Tweed Heads West, NSW)
Broadcast live on Channel 9
Referee: Chris Butler.

Skill360 Northern Pride: 1. Chey Bird – FB 4. Davin Crampton – WG 3. Brett Anderson – CE 18. Saia Makisi – CE 5. Scott Gibson – WG 6. Ty Williams (c) – FE 7. Ryan Ghietti – HB 20. Scott Bolton* – PR 9. Jason Roos – HK 10. Ben Laity – PR 11. Cory Paterson* – SR 12. Ben Spina – SR 13. Joel Riethmuller* – LK
Interchange: 8. Luke Harlen*, 14. Blake Leary*, 16. Luke Saunders, 17. Ethan Lowe.
* = Cowboys allocation.
Tweed Seagulls: 1. Phil Graham, 2. Brad Lees, 3. James Wood, 4. Dominique Peyroux, 5. Tom Merritt, 6. Ryan Milligan, 7. Brad Davis (c), 8. Jake Leary, 9. Matt King, 10. Selasi Berdie, 11. Ben Ridge, 12. Cody Nelson, 13. Rod Griffin.
Interchange: 14. Matt Hundy, 15. Blake Anderson, 16. Aaron Cannings, 17. Michael Parker-Walshe.
Coach: Ben Anderson.
- Note: Broadcast live on Channel 9 with Andrew Voss, Ben Ikin and Nick Curry.
  This was the Pride debut for Scott Gibson (Player 076) and Saia Makisi (Pride Players 076 & 080).

Position	Round 6 – 2012	P	W	D	L	For	Against	Diff	Pts
7	Northern Pride	6	2	0	4	120	134	−14	4

ROUND 7: Intrust Super Cup 2012 'Men of League' Rivalry Round

Saturday
28 April 2012
17:30 AEST (UTC+10)

Northern Pride	26 – 12	Sunshine Coast Sea Eagles
Tries: Ben Fitzpatrick 1 Davin Crampton 1 Ty Williams 1 Chey Bird 1 Blake Leary* 1 Goals: Ethan Lowe 3	Pride Preview; Pride Report; QRL Report; Press Conference	Tries: 1 Hughie Stanley; 1 Todd Murphy Goals: 2 Dale Middleton

Barlow Park
(Severin Street, Parramatta Park, QLD)
Referee: Robert Gallacher.

Skill360 Northern Pride: 1. Ben Fitzpatrick – FB 2. Scott Gibson – WG 3. Brett Anderson – CE 4. Rod Jensen – CE 5. Davin Crampton – WG 6. Ty Williams (c) – FE 7. Ryan Ghietti – HB 16. Mark Dalle Cort – PR 9. Jason Roos – HK 10. Ben Laity – PR 11. Ethan Lowe – SR 14. Blake Leary* – SR 12. Ben Spina – LK
Interchange: 15. Jamie Frizzo, 17. Alex Starmer, 18. Saia Makisi, 19. Chey Bird.
* = Cowboys allocation.
Sunshine Coast Sea Eagles: 1. Hughie Stanley, 2. Patrick Templeman, 3. Rowan Klein, 4. Mitchell Buckett, 5. Dale Middleton, 6. Callum Klein, 7. Todd Murphy (c), 8. Martin Cordwell, 9. Brenton Stonier, 10. Alex Simpson, 11. Kristian Wanka, 12. Jaz Nahu-Main, 13. Peter Gallen.
Interchange: 14. Kane Richards, 15. Jon Platt, 16. Jye Ballinger, 17.Zac Litherland.
Coach: Dave Cordwell.

Position	Round 7 – 2012	P	W	D	L	For	Against	Diff	Pts
6	Northern Pride	7	3	0	4	146	146	0	6

ROUND 8: Intrust Super Cup 2012

Saturday
5 May 2012
17:30 AEST (UTC+10)

Northern Pride	20 – 18	Wynnum Manly Seagulls
Tries: Kalifa Faifai Loa* 1 Ty Williams 1 Blake Leary* 1 Scott Bolton* 1 Goals: Ethan Lowe (1 from 3) 1 Cory Paterson* (1 from 1) 1 Penalty Goals:	Pride Report; Pride Report; QRL Report; Press Conference	Tries: 1 Dan Wallace; 1 Junior Tongia; 1 Jake Granville Goals: 2 Matt Seamark (2 from 3) Penalty Goals: 1 Matt Seamark (1 from 1)

Barlow Park
(Severin Street, Parramatta Park, QLD)
Referee: Robert Gallacher.

Skill360 Northern Pride: 1. Ben Fitzpatrick – FB 2. Scott Gibson – WG 3. Brett Anderson – CE 5. Davin Crampton – CE 18. Kalifa Faifai Loa* – WG 6. Ty Williams (c) – FE 7. Ryan Ghietti – HB 20. Scott Bolton* – PR 9. Jason Roos – HK 10. Ben Laity – PR 11. Ethan Lowe – SR 12. Ben Spina – SR 13. Joel Riethmuller* – LK
Interchange: 8. Alex Starmer, 14. Blake Leary*, 15. Jamie Frizzo, 16. Cory Paterson*.
* = Cowboys allocation.
Wynnum-Manly Seagulls: 1. Sean Loxley, 2. Peter Gubb, 3. Dan Wallace, 4. Jason Moon, 5. Nathanael Barnes, 6. Jacob Fauid, 7. Matt Seamark, 8. Charlie Gubb, 9. Jake Granville, 10. Dane Carlaw, 11. Mitchell Dodds, 12. Jon Grieve, 13. Luke Dalziel-Don (c).
Interchange: 14. John Te Reo, 15. Matt Smith, 16. Tim Natusch, 17. Andrew Clayton, Junior Tongia.
Coach: Paul Green.

Position	Round 8 – 2012	P	W	D	L	For	Against	Diff	Pts
6	Northern Pride	8	4	0	4	166	164	+2	8

ROUND 9: Intrust Super Cup 2012

Saturday
12 May 2012
17:30 AEST (UTC+10)

Northern Pride	24 – 22	Burleigh Bears
Tries: Kalifa Faifai Loa* 1 Scott Gibson 1 Ty Williams 1 Jason Roos 1 Goals: Cory Paterson* 4	Pride Report; QRL Report; Press Conference	Tries: 1 Jamie Dowling; 1 Kurt Sorensen; 1 Bodene Thompson; 1 James Stuart; Goals: 2 Danny Kerr; 1 Sam Meskell

Barlow Park
(Severin Street, Parramatta Park, QLD)
Referee: Nick Kalpakidis.

Skill360 Northern Pride: 1. Ben Fitzpatrick – FB 22. Kalifa Faifai Loa* – WG 3. Brett Anderson – CE 4. Davin Crampton – CE 5. Scott Gibson – WG 6. Ty Williams (c) – FE 7. Ryan Ghietti – HB 8. Alex Starmer – PR 9. Jason Roos – HK 12. Ben Spina – PR 11. Ethan Lowe – SR 14. Blake Leary* – SR 13. Joel Riethmuller* – LK
Interchange: 15. Jamie Frizzo, 16. Cory Paterson*, 17. Mark Dalle Cort, 19. Maddie Oosen.
* = Cowboys allocation.
Unavailable: Ben Laity (sternum). Laity had played 178 Queensland Cup games and this was the first game he missed due to injury.
Burleigh Bears: 1. Jamie Dowling, 2. Dan Kerr, 3. Dave Sheehan, 4. Steve Michaels, 5. Michael Brophy, 6. Danny Kerr, 7. Todd Seymour, 8. Darren Griffiths (c), 9. Sam Meskell, 10. Brenton Lawrence, 11. Tyron Haynes, 12. Blake Morrison, 13. Kurt Sorensen (c).
Interchange: 14. Louie Fanene, 15. Josh Coyle, 16. Pele Peletelese, 17. Ayden Lee.
Coach: Paul Bramley.

Position	Round 9 – 2012	P	W	D	L	For	Against	Diff	Pts
7	Northern Pride	9	5	0	4	190	186	+4	10

ROUND 10: Intrust Super Cup 2012

Sunday
20 May 2012
15:00 AEST (UTC+10)

Norths Devils	26 – 14	Northern Pride
Tries: Namila Daviu 1 Daniel Ogden 2 Jarrod Wallace 1 Sione Lolhea 1 Goals: Mitchel Frei 2 Penalty Goal: Joel Bailey 1	Pride Report; QRL Report	Tries: 1 Rod Jensen; 1 Scott Gibson; 1 Ethan Lowe Goals: 1 Blake Leary*; Penalty Goal:

Albert Bishop Park
(Hedley Avenue, Nundah QLD)
Referee: Robert Gallacher.

Skill360 Northern Pride: 1. Ben Fitzpatrick – FB 15. Saia Makisi – WG 3. Brett Anderson – CE 4. Rod Jensen – CE 5. Scott Gibson – WG 6. Ty Williams (c) – FE 7. Ryan Ghietti – HB 8. Ben Spina – PR 9. Jason Roos – HK 10. Alex Starmer – PR 11. Ethan Lowe – SR 12. Blake Leary* – SR 13. Joel Riethmuller* – LK
Interchange: 14. Jamie Frizzo, 16. Mark Dalle Cort, 17. Cory Paterson*, 19. Maddie Oosen.
* = Cowboys allocation.
Unavailable: Ben Laity (sternum).
Norths Devils: 1. Daniel Ogden, 2. Sione Lolohea, 3. Joel Bailey, 4. Namila Davui, 5. Keiran English, 6. Ben Sullivan, 7. Matt Smith (c), 8. Jarrod Wallace, 9. Kurt Baptiste, 10. Natthan Cleaver, 11. Mitchell Frei, 12. Chris McLean, 13. Jamie Muller.
Interchange: 15. Pat McPherson, 16. Steve Darby, 17. Mark Vaiao, 19. Jay Aston.
Coach: Craig Hodges.
- Note: This was the Pride debut for Maddie Oosen (Player 081).

Position	Round 10 – 2012	P	W	D	L	For	Against	Diff	Pts
7	Northern Pride	10	5	0	5	204	212	−8	10

ROUND 11: Intrust Super Cup 2012

Saturday
26 May 2012
17:30 AEST (UTC+10)

Northern Pride	32 – 18	Redcliffe Dolphins
Tries: Brett Anderson 1 Rod Jensen 1 Ty Williams 2 Ryan Ghietti 1 Jason Roos 1 Goals: Blake Leary* 4	Pride Report; QRL Report; Press Conference; Video Highlights	Tries: 2 Luke Capewell; 1 Liam Georgetown Goals: 3 Liam Georgetown (3 from 3)

Barlow Park
(Severin Street, Parramatta Park, QLD)
Referee: Clayton Sharpe.

Skill360 Northern Pride: 22. Kalifa Faifai Loa* – FB 2. Davin Crampton – WG 3. Brett Anderson – CE 4. Rod Jensen – CE 5. Scott Gibson – WG 6. Ty Williams (c) – FE 7. Ryan Ghietti – HB 8. Ben Spina – PR 9. Jason Roos – HK 20. Scott Bolton* – PR 11. Ethan Lowe – SR 12. Blake Leary* – SR 13. Joel Riethmuller* – LK
Interchange: 10. Alex Starmer, 14. Jamie Frizzo, 15. Luke Saunders, 19. Maddie Oosen.
* = Cowboys allocation.
Unavailable: Ben Laity (sternum).
Redcliffe Dolphins: 1. Dane Gagai, 2. Delroy Berryman, 3. Aaron Whitchurch, 4. Paul Ivan, 5. Liam Georgetown, 6. Maurice Kennedy, 7. Luke Capewell, 8. Chris Farrell (c), 9. Tui Samoa, 10. Isaak Ah Mau, 11. Derrick Watkins, 12. Chris Faust, 13. Tom Murphy.
Interchange: 14. Zach Strasser, 15. James Ackerman, 16. Matt Handcock, 17. Zac Lemberg.
Coach: John Dixon.
- Note: This was the Pride's 50th ISC game at Barlow Park.

Position	Round 11 – 2012	P	W	D	L	For	Against	Diff	Pts
6	Northern Pride	11	6	0	5	236	230	+6	12

ROUND 12: Intrust Super Cup 2012

Saturday
2 June 2012
15:00 AEST (UTC+10)

Ipswich Jets	38 – 14	Northern Pride
Tries: Donald Malone 2 Jarrod McInally 2 Sam Martin 2 Javarn White 1 Ramon Filipine 1 Goals: Brendon Lindsay 3	Pride Report; QRL Report	Tries: 1 Scott Gibson; 1 Blake Leary*; 1 Luke Saunders Goals: 1 Blake Leary*

North Ipswich Reserve
(Ipswich, QLD)
Broadcast live on Channel 9
Referee: Chris Butler.

Skill360 Northern Pride: 1. Kalifa Faifai Loa* – FB 2. Davin Crampton – WG 3. Brett Anderson – CE 4. Rod Jensen – CE 5. Scott Gibson – WG 6. Ty Williams (c) – FE 7. Ryan Ghietti – HB 8. Ben Spina – PR 9. Jason Roos – HK 10. Scott Bolton* – PR 11. Ethan Lowe – SR 12. Blake Leary* – SR 13. Joel Riethmuller* – LK
Interchange: 14. Maddie Oosen, 15. Luke Saunders, 16. Alex Starmer, 17. Ben Laity.
* = Cowboys allocation.
Unavailable: Chey Bird (hamstring), Ben Fitzpatrick (hand and leg).
Ipswich Jets: 1. Javarn White, 2. Ramon Filipine, 3. Donald Malone, 4. Brendan Marshall, 5. Jarrod McInally, 6. Brendon Lindsay, 7. Ian Lacey, 8. Tyson Lofipo, 9. Todd Riggs, 10. Rowan Winterfield, 11. Sam Martin, 12. Lorenzo Maafu, 13. Keiron Lander (c).
Interchange: 14. Smith Samau, 15. Luke Page, 16. Luke Walker, 17. Kurtis Lingwoodock.
Coaches: Ben Walker and Shane Walker.
- Note: Broadcast live on Channel 9 with Andrew Voss, Ben Ikin and Nick Curry.

Position	Round 12 – 2012	P	W	D	L	For	Against	Diff	Pts
7	Northern Pride	12	6	0	6	250	268	−18	12

ROUND 13: Intrust Super Cup 2012

Sunday
10 June 2012
14:00 AEST (UTC+10)

Northern Pride	36 – 10	Mackay Cutters
Tries: Wayne Ulugia* 1 Brett Anderson 1 Ty Williams 1 Ben Spina 2 Ethan Lowe 1 Scott Bolton* 1 Goals: Chey Bird 4	Pride Report; QRL Report	Tries: 1 Grant Rovelli; 1 Matt Minto Goals: 1 Liam Taylor

Barlow Park
(Severin Street, Parramatta Park, QLD)
Broadcast live on Channel 9
Attendance: 3,200
Referee: Clayton Sharpe.

Skill360 Northern Pride: 1. Ben Fitzpatrick – FB 2. Wayne Ulugia* – WG 3. Brett Anderson – CE 4. Chey Bird – CE 5. Davin Crampton – WG 6. Ty Williams (c) – FE 7. Ryan Ghietti – HB 8. Ben Spina – PR 9. Jason Roos – HK 10. Ricky Thorby* – PR 11. Ethan Lowe – SR 14. Blake Leary* – SR 13. Joel Riethmuller* – LK
Interchange: 12. Cory Paterson*, 15. Luke Saunders, 16. Alex Starmer, 20. Scott Bolton*.
* = Cowboys allocation.
Mackay Cutters: 1. David Milne, 2. Liam Taylor, 3. Ben Jones, 4. Moses Pangai, 5. Michael Thomas, 6. Grant Rovelli (c), 7. Matt Minto, 8. Lewis Balcomb, 9. Neil Budworth, 10. Sam Hoare, 11. Jason Schirnack, 12. Dane Hogan, 13. Jardine Bobongie.
Interchange: 14. Kelvin Nielsen, 15. Tyson Andrews, 16. Jack Clark, 17. Luke Fatnowna, 18. Chris Gesch.
Coach: Anthony Seibold.
- Note: First televised game from Barlow Park, broadcast live on Channel 9 with Andrew Voss, Ben Ikin and Nick Curry. Cairns accounting firm BDO sponsor the game and general admission is free.
  This match attracted a crowd of 3,200, a QCup record for Barlow Park.
  After the televised QCup game, Channel 9 show the Brisbane Broncos v Sydney Roosters game.
  This was the Pride debut for North Queensland Cowboys player Wayne Ulugia* (Pride Player 082).

Position	Round 13 – 2012	P	W	D	L	For	Against	Diff	Pts
6	Northern Pride	13	7	0	6	286	278	+8	14

ROUND 14: Intrust Super Cup 2012

Sunday
17 June 2012
14:00 AEST (UTC+10)

Burleigh Bears	34 – 16	Northern Pride
Tries: Anthony Don 2 Michael Brophy 1 Brad Bennett 1 Beau Falloon 1 Sam Meskell 1 Goals: Jordan Rankin 5	Pride Report; QRL Report; Video Highlights	Tries: 1 Ben Spina; 1 Joel Riethmuller*; 1 Cory Paterson* Goals: 2 Cory Paterson*

Pizzey Park
(Miami, Gold Coast, QLD)
Referee: Nick Kalpakidis.

Skill360 Northern Pride: 1. Ben Fitzpatrick – FB 2. Wayne Ulugia* – WG 5. Davin Crampton – CE 4. Chey Bird – CE 22. Kalifa Faifai Loa* – WG 6. Ty Williams (c) – FE 7. Ryan Ghietti – HB 8. Ben Spina – PR 9. Jason Roos – HK 20. Scott Bolton* – PR 11. Ethan Lowe – SR 12. Blake Leary* – SR 13. Joel Riethmuller* – LK
Interchange: 10. Alex Starmer, 15. Luke Saunders, 17. Ben Laity, 18. Cory Paterson*.
* = Cowboys allocation.
Burleigh Bears: 1. Michael Brophy, 2. Ethan Mafi, 3. Anthony Don, 4. Dave Sheehan, 5. Dan Kerr, 6. Jordan Rankin, 7. Brad Bennett, 8. Josh Coyle, 9. Beau Falloon, 10. Louis Fanene, 11. Darren Griffiths (c), 12. Jesse Malcolm, 13. Kurt Sorensen (c).
Interchange: 14. Sam Meskell, 15. Blake Morrison, 16. Pele Peletelese, 18. Jason Bradfield.
Coach: Paul Bramley.
- Note: After this match, Pride coach David Maiden announced he would be leaving the club at the end of this season.

Position	Round 14 – 2012	P	W	D	L	For	Against	Diff	Pts
7	Northern Pride	14	7	0	7	302	312	−10	14

ROUND 15: Intrust Super Cup 2012. Women in League Round

Saturday
23 June 2012
17:30 AEST (UTC+10)

Northern Pride	14 – 30	Tweed Heads Seagulls
Tries: Davin Crampton 2 Luke Saunders 1 Goals: Chey Bird (1 from 3) 1	Pride Report; Press Conference	Tries: 2 Tom Merritt; 1 James Wood; 1 Ryan James; 1 Matt King; 1 Joe Vickery; Goals: 3 Matt Hundy (3 from 5); 0 Joe Vickery (0 from 1)

Barlow Park
(Severin Street, Parramatta Park, QLD)
Referee: Clayton Sharpe.

Skill360 Northern Pride: 1. Wayne Ulugia* – FB 2. Scott Gibson – WG 3. Davin Crampton – CE 4. Chey Bird – CE 5. Kalifa Faifai Loa* – WG 6. Ty Williams (c) – FE 7. Mitchell Seri – HB 8. Alex Starmer – PR 9. Jason Roos – HK 10. Ben Laity – PR 11. Ben Spina – SR 12. Luke Saunders – SR 15. Ethan Lowe – LK
Interchange: 14. Maddie Oosen, 16. Rod Jensen, 18. Saia Makisi, 22. Noel Underwood.
* = Cowboys allocation.
Unavailable: Brett Anderson (osteitis pubis).
Tweed Seagulls: 1. Phil Graham, 2. Joe Vickery, 3. James Wood, 4. Matt Hundy, 5. Tom Merritt, 6. Brad Davis (c), 7. Beau Henry, 8. Aaron Cannings, 9. Matt King, 10. Jake Leary, 11. Rod Griffin, 12. Dominique Peyroux, 13. Ryan James.
Interchange: 14. Michael Henderson, 15. Matt Carbutt, 16. Brenton Fidock, 17. Michael Parker-Walshe.
Coach: Ben Anderson.
- Note: Women in League round. Players wore pink socks and pink bootlaces.

Position	Round 15 – 2012	P	W	D	L	For	Against	Diff	Pts
7	Northern Pride	15	7	0	8	316	342	−26	14

ROUND 16: Intrust Super Cup 2012 NAIDOC Week

Saturday
7 July 2012
17:30 AEST (UTC+10)

Northern Pride	38 – 26	CQ Capras
Tries: Wayne Ulugia* 1 Brett Anderson 1 Cory Paterson* 4 Ethan Lowe 1 Goals: Chey Bird (5 from 7) 5	Pride Report; QRL Report	Tries: 2 Sailosi Vatubua; 1 Tim Glasby; 1 Sione Tongia; 1 Williams; Goals: 3 Tyron Cranston (3 from 5)

Barlow Park
(Severin Street, Parramatta Park, QLD)
Referee: Nick Kalpakidis.

Skill360 Northern Pride: 1. Wayne Ulugia* – FB 2. Scott Gibson – WG 3. Brett Anderson – CE 4. Chey Bird – CE 5. Kalifa Faifai Loa* – WG 6. Ty Williams (c) – FE 7. Mitchell Seri – HB 17. Alex Starmer – PR 9. Jason Roos – HK 10. Ben Laity – PR 16. Ethan Lowe – SR 12. Cory Paterson* – SR 11. Ben Spina – LK
Interchange: 14. Blake Leary*, 15. Luke Saunders, 18. Saia Makisi, 19. Rod Jensen.
* = Cowboys allocation.
CQ Capras: 1. Reece Baker, 2. Tyron Cranston, 3. Brent Williams, 4. Mitch Zornig, 5. Russell Webber, 6. Gavin Duffy, 7. Jonathon Tavinor, 8. Tim Glasby (c), 9. Cheyenne Motu, 10. James Taputu-Crombie, 11. Guy Williams, 12. John Clayton, 13. Dallas Williams.
Interchange: 14. Rhys Chapman, 15. Reece Goldsmith, 17. Sailosi Vatubua, 20. Sione Tongia.
Coach: John Harbin.
- Note: NAIDOC Week game. The Pride wore a special green NAIDOC jersey.

Position	Round 16 – 2012	P	W	D	L	For	Against	Diff	Pts
7	Northern Pride	16	8	0	8	354	368	−14	16

ROUND 17: Intrust Super Cup 2012 'Country Week'

Saturday
14 July 2012
15:00 AEST (UTC+10)

Souths Logan Magpies	26 – 28	Northern Pride
Tries: Ben Cronin 1 Dane Phillips 1 Darcy Wright 1 Mat Pitman 1 Chris Medcalf 1 Goals: Josh Damen 3	Pride Report; Video Highlights	Tries: 1 Kalifa Faifai Loa*; 1 Ben Spina; 2 Cory Paterson*; 1 Saia Makisi Goals: 4 Cory Paterson*

Alec Inch Oval
(Mt Isa, QLD)
Referee: Nic Morell.

Skill360 Northern Pride: 1. Wayne Ulugia* – FB 2. Scott Gibson – WG 3. Brett Anderson – CE 4. Chey Bird – CE

5. Kalifa Faifai Loa* – WG 6. Ty Williams (c) – FE 7. Mitchell Seri – HB 8. Alex Starmer – PR 9. Jason Roos – HK 10. Ben Laity – PR 11. Ben Spina – SR 12. Cory Paterson* – SR 13. Joel Riethmuller* – LK

Interchange: 15. Brent Oosen, 16. Ethan Lowe, 17. Saia Makisi, 18. Rod Jensen.
* = Cowboys allocation.
Unavailable: Luke Saunders (neck).
Souths Logan Magpies: 1. Dallas Anderson, 2. Chris Medcalf, 3. Nick Doyle, 4. Matt Templeman, 5. Josh Damon, 6. Ben Thorburn, 7. Dane Phillips, 8. Mat Pitman, 9. Ben Cronin, 10. Matt Cameron, 11. Andrew Edwards, 12. Sam Gardel, 13. Rez Phillips.
Interchange: 14. Dan Humphreys, 15. Darcy Wright, 16. Daniel Bell, 17. Simanu Crichton.
Coach: Mark Beaumont.
- Note: Country Week game. The Pride wore a special orange 'outback jersey'.
  This was Ben Spina's 50th appearance for the Pride.
  This was the Pride debut for Brent Oosen (Player 083).
  Jason Roos injured his knee and needed a reconstruction.

Position	Round 17 – 2012	P	W	D	L	For	Against	Diff	Pts
7	Northern Pride	17	9	0	8	382	394	−12	18

ROUND 18: Intrust Super Cup 2012

Sunday
22 July 2012
15:00 AEST (UTC+10)

Sunshine Coast Sea Eagles	21 – 18	Northern Pride
Tries: Jye Ballinger 2 Callum Klein 1 Goals: Justin Otto 4 Field Goal: Justin Otto 1	Pride Report; Pride Report	Tries: 1 Brett Anderson; 1 Justin Castellaro; 1 Alex Starmer; 1 Ryan Ghietti; Goals: 1 Justin Castellaro; Field Goal:

Stockland Park
(Sportsmans Parade, Bokarina, Kawana Waters, QLD)
Referee: Robert Gallacher.

Skill360 Northern Pride: 1. Wayne Ulugia* – FB 2. Scott Gibson – WG 3. Brett Anderson – CE 4. Chey Bird – CE 5. Justin Castellaro – WG 6. Ty Williams (c) – FE 7. Mitchell Seri – HB 8. Alex Starmer – PR 14. Rod Jensen – HK 10. Ben Laity – PR 11. Ben Spina – SR 16. Ethan Lowe – SR 13. Joel Riethmuller* – LK
Interchange: 9. Blake Leary*, 15. Brent Oosen, 17. Saia Makisi, 19. Ryan Ghietti.
* = Cowboys allocation.
Unavailable: Jason Roos (knee), Luke Saunders (neck).
Sunshine Coast Sea Eagles: 1. Hughie Stanley, 2. Kev McKenzie, 3. Jake Meninga Short, 4. Mitchell Buckett, 5. Paul McKewin, 6. Callum Klein, 7. Justin Otto, 8. Zac Litherland, 9. Troy Mendham, 10. Alex Simpson, 11. Kristian Wanka, 12. Jaz Nahu-Main, 13. Brenton Stonier.
Interchange: 14. James Boyce, 15. Peter Gallen, 16. Jye Ballinger, 17. Rob Cordwell.
Coach: Dave Cordwell.
- Note: This was the Pride debut for Justin Castellaro (Pride Player 084).

Position	Round 18 – 2012	P	W	D	L	For	Against	Diff	Pts
7	Northern Pride	18	9	0	9	400	415	−15	18

ROUND 19: Intrust Super Cup 2012

Sunday
29 July 2012
15:00 AEST (UTC+10)

Wynnum Manly Seagulls	16 – 44	Northern Pride
Tries: Nathanael Barnes 1 Dane Carlaw 1 John Te Reo 1 Goals: Matt Seamark 2	Pride Report; QRL Report	Tries: 2 Wayne Ulugia*; 1 Shaun Nona; 1 Blake Leary*; 1 Cory Paterson*; 2 Joel Riethmuller*; 1 Ryan Ghietti; Goals: 6 Cory Paterson*

BMD Kougari Oval
(Manly West, Brisbane, QLD)
Referee: Michael Wise

Skill360 Northern Pride: 1. Ty Williams (c) – FB 2. Wayne Ulugia* – WG 3. Brett Anderson – CE 4. Scott Gibson – CE 19. Hezron Murgha – WG 6. Shaun Nona – FE 7. Mitchell Seri – HB 8. Saia Makisi – PR 9. Blake Leary* – HK 10. Alex Starmer – PR 11. Cory Paterson* – SR 12. Joel Riethmuller* – SR 13. Ben Spina – LK
Interchange: 14. Ryan Ghietti, 15. Brent Oosen, 16. Ethan Lowe, 17. Ben Laity.
* = Cowboys allocation.
Unavailable: Jason Roos (knee).
Wynnum Manly Seagulls: 1. Nathanael Barnes, 2. Peter Gubb, 3. Dan Wallace, 4. Jason Moon, 5. Junior Togia, 6. Jacob Fauid, 7. Matt Seamark, 8. Charlie Gubb, 9. Jake Granville, 10. Dane Carlaw, 11. Tim Natusch, 12. Jon Grieve, 13. Luke Dalziel-Don (c).
Interchange: 14. John Te Reo, 15. Matt Smith, 16. Andrew Clayton, 17. Ben Shea.
Coach: Paul Green.
- Note: Captain Ty Williams suffered an ACL injury early in this game.

Position	Round 19 – 2012	P	W	D	L	For	Against	Diff	Pts
7	Northern Pride	19	10	0	9	444	431	+13	20

ROUND 20: Intrust Super Cup 2012

Saturday
11 August 2012
17:30 AEST (UTC+10)

Northern Pride	28 – 28	Norths Devils
Tries: Hezron Murgha 1 Kalifa Faifai Loa* 1 Ben Laity 1 Blake Leary* 2 Goals: Shaun Nona (1 from 2) 1 Cory Paterson* (3 from 3) 3	Pride Report; Press Conference	Tries: 2 Keiran English; 1 Natthan Cleaver; 1 Matt Smith; 1 Jacob Samoa; Goals: 4 Joel Bailey (4 from 5)

Barlow Park
(Severin Street, Parramatta Park, QLD)
Referee: Nick Kalpakidis.

Skill360 Northern Pride: 1. Hezron Murgha – FB 2. Wayne Ulugia* – WG 3. Brett Anderson (c) – CE 4. Scott Gibson – CE 5. Kalifa Faifai Loa* – WG 6. Shaun Nona – FE 7. Mitchell Seri – HB 22. Ricky Thorby* – PR 9. Blake Leary* – HK 10. Alex Starmer – PR 11. Cory Paterson* – SR 12. Saia Makisi – SR 13. Ben Spina – LK
Interchange: 8. Ben Laity, 14. Ryan Ghietti, 15. Brent Oosen, 16. Ethan Lowe.
* = Cowboys allocation.
Unavailable: Jason Roos (knee), Ty Williams (ACL).
Norths Devils: 1. Daniel Ogden, 2. Dylan Galloway, 3. Joel Bailey, 4. Namila Davui, 5. Keiran English, 6. Angus Cameron, 7. Matt Smith (c), 8. Scott Anderson, 9. Kurt Baptiste, 10. Natthan Cleaver, 11. Brendon Gibb, 12. Chris Mclean, 13. Mark Vaiao.
Interchange: 15. Pat McPherson, 16. Ryan Hansen, 17. Jacob Samoa, 19. Jamie Muller.
Coach: Craig Hodges.

Position	Round 20 – 2012	P	W	D	L	For	Against	Diff	Pts
7	Northern Pride	20	10	1	9	472	459	+13	21

ROUND 21: Intrust Super Cup 2012

Saturday
18 August 2012
17:30 AEST (UTC+10)

Northern Pride	44 – 10	Easts Tigers
Tries: Wayne Ulugia* 2 Brett Anderson 2 Kalifa Faifai Loa* 1 Alex Starmer 1 Ryan Ghietti 1 Ethan Lowe 1 Goals: Shaun Nona 4 Cory Paterson* (2 from 2) 2	Pride Report; QRL Report; Press Conference	Tries: 1 Leon Panapa; 1 Cody Walker Goals: 1 Cody Walker (1 from 2)

Barlow Park
(Severin Street, Parramatta Park, QLD)
Referee: Michael Wise.

Skill360 Northern Pride: 1. Chey Bird – FB 2. Wayne Ulugia* – WG 3. Brett Anderson (c) – CE 4. Scott Gibson – CE 5. Kalifa Faifai Loa* – WG 6. Shaun Nona – FE 7. Mitchell Seri – HB 18. Joel Riethmuller* – PR 9. Blake Leary* – HK 10. Alex Starmer – PR 16. Ethan Lowe – SR 12. Saia Makisi – SR 13. Ben Spina – LK
Interchange: 11. Cory Paterson*, 14. Ryan Ghietti, 15. Rod Jensen, 17. Ben Laity.
* = Cowboys allocation.
Unavailable: Jason Roos (knee), Ty Williams (ACL).
Easts Tigers: 1. Corey Thompson, 2. Maeli Seve, 3. Shane Neumann (c), 4. Eddie Tautali, 5. Ryan Tongia, 6. Cody Walker, 7. Isaac Kaufmann, 8. Steven Thorpe, 9. McKanah Gibson, 10. Jordan McLean, 11. Matthew Zgrajewski, 12. Wiremu Ratana, 13. Leon Panapa.
Interchange: 14. Liam McDonald, 15. Liufau Hala, 16. Luke Lavelle, 17. Lance Morris.
Coach: Troy McCarthy.

Position	Round 21 – 2012	P	W	D	L	For	Against	Diff	Pts
7	Northern Pride	21	11	1	9	516	469	+47	23

ROUND 22: Intrust Super Cup 2012

Sunday
26 August 2012
15:00 AEST (UTC+10)

Redcliffe Dolphins	28 – 38	Northern Pride
Tries: Joe Bond 1 Liam Georgetown 1 Maurice Kennedy 1 Aaron Whitchurch 1 Troy Giess 1 Goals: Liam Georgetown 4	Pride Report; Video Highlights	Tries: 1 Wayne Ulugia*; 1 Brett Anderson; 1 Shaun Nona; 2 James Segeyaro*; 1 Cory Paterson*; 1 Ethan Lowe; Goals: 1 Chey Bird; 4 Cory Paterson*

Dolphin Oval
(Klingner Road, Redcliffe, QLD)
Referee: Michael Wise

Skill360 Northern Pride: 1. Chey Bird – FB 2. Wayne Ulugia* – WG 3. Brett Anderson (c) – CE 14. Justin Castellaro – CE 5. Kalifa Faifai Loa* – WG 6. Shaun Nona – FE 7. Ryan Ghietti – HB 22. Joel Riethmuller* – PR 18. James Segeyaro* – HK 10. Alex Starmer – PR 11. Cory Paterson* – SR 12. Ethan Lowe – SR 13. Ben Spina – LK
Interchange: 8. Ben Laity, 16. Luke Saunders, 17. Saia Makisi, 19. Jamie Frizzo.
* = Cowboys allocation.
Unavailable: Jason Roos (knee), Ty Williams (ACL).
Redcliffe Dolphins: 1. Joe Bond, 2. Delroy Berryman, 3. Marty Hatfield, 4. Mitch Rivett, 5. Liam Georgetown, 6. Maurice Kennedy, 7. Zach Strasser, 8. Chris Farrell (c), 9. Tom Butterfield, 10. Isaak Ah Mau, 11. Paul Ivan, 12. Aaron Whitchurch, 13. Nick Slyney.
Interchange: 14. Tom Murphy, 15. James Ackerman, 16. Matt Handcock, 17. Chris Faust.
Coach: John Dixon.
- Note: Chey Bird's last game. Bird was a foundation player (Pride Player No. 001). He captained the team on several occasions and played in the 2010 Premiership Grand Final team. He scored 574 points (23 tries and 241 goals) in 96 games for the Pride and set a Pride record of 33 straight conversions between Rounds 5 and 12 in 2011.

Position	Round 22 – 2012	P	W	D	L	For	Against	Diff	Pts
7	Northern Pride	22	12	1	9	554	497	+57	25

=== 2012 Ladder ===
2012 Queensland Cup season
	Team	Pld	W	D	L	PF	PA	PD	Pts
1	Redcliffe Dolphins	22	17	0	5	724	390	334	34
2	Wynnum Manly Seagulls	22	16	1	5	624	436	188	33
3	Tweed Heads Seagulls	22	14	1	7	530	473	57	29
4	Ipswich Jets	22	13	2	7	520	421	99	28
5	Norths Devils	22	12	2	8	654	510	144	26
6	Easts Tigers	22	13	0	9	621	496	125	26
7	Northern Pride	22	12	1	9	554	497	57	25
8	Mackay Cutters	22	10	0	12	488	544	−56	20
9	Burleigh Bears	22	7	1	14	427	479	−52	15
10	CQ Capras	22	5	1	16	432	743	−311	11
11	Sunshine Coast Sea Eagles	22	4	1	17	376	699	−323	9
12	Souths Logan Magpies	22	3	2	17	422	684	−262	8

==== Northern Pride (regular season 2012) ====
- Win = 12 (8 of 11 home games, 4 of 11 away games)
- Loss = 9 (2 of 11 home games, 7 of 11 away games)
- Draw = 1 (1 of 11 home games, 0 of 11 away games).

Round	1	2	3	4	5	6	7	8	9	10	11	12	13	14	15	16	17	18	19	20	21	22
Result	W	W	L	L	L	L	W	W	W	L	W	L	W	L	L	W	W	L	W	D	W	W
Ground	H	A	A	H	A	A	H	H	H	A	H	A	H	A	H	H	A	A	A	H	H	A

Source: https://web.archive.org/web/20120916041305/http://www.qrl.com.au/
A = Away; H = Home; B = Bye; W = Win; D = Draw; L = Loss

== 2012 Northern Pride players ==
Pride player	Appearances	Tries	Goals	Field goals	Pts
Alex Starmer	16	2	0	0	8
Ben Fitzpatrick	6	1	0	0	4
Ben Laity	18	1	0	0	4
Ben Spina	22	6	0	0	24
Brent Oosen	4	0	0	0	0
Brett Anderson	20	14	0	0	56
Chey Bird	11	1	14	0	32
Davin Crampton	14	6	0	0	24
Ethan Lowe	22	7	4	0	36
Hezron Murgha	8	4	0	0	16
Jamie Frizzo	10	1	0	0	4
Jason Roos	17	2	0	0	8
Justin Castellaro	2	1	1	0	6
Luke Saunders	11	2	0	0	8
Maddie Oosen	5	0	0	0	0
Mark Dalle Cort	9	0	0	0	0
Mitchell Seri	4	0	4	0	8
Noel Underwood	6	1	0	0	4
Rod Jensen	14	2	0	0	8
Ryan Ghietti	17	4	0	0	16
Saia Makisi	11	1	0	0	4
Scott Gibson	14	4	0	0	16
Shaun Nona	7	2	12	0	32
Ty Williams	19	7	0	0	28

=== North Queensland Cowboys who played for the Pride in 2012 ===
Cowboys player	Appearances	Tries	Goals	Field goals	Pts
Blake Leary*	14	6	6	0	36
Cory Paterson*	15	9	26	0	88
James Segeyaro*	1	2	0	0	8
Joel Riethmuller	13	3	0	0	12
Kalifa Faifai Loa*	16	7	0	0	28
Luke Harlen*	6	0	0	0	0
Ricky Thorby*	4	0	0	0	0
Robert Lui*	2	0	0	0	0
Scott Bolton*	8	2	0	0	8
Wayne Ulugia*	10	7	0	0	28

== 2012 Televised Games ==
In 2012, the Nine Entertainment Network acquired the broadcast rights to the Queensland Cup in a one-year deal, after ABC TV's contract expired. One game a round continued to be broadcast, live, and free-to-air across Queensland. In 2012 games were shown on Channel 9 or GEM in south-east Queensland, on WIN Television (RTQ) in regional areas, and on Imparja Television in remote areas, at 2.00pm (AEST) on Sunday afternoons (except during coverage of the London Olympics in August). The move to a Sunday timeslot meant the QCup match was shown at 2:00 pm before the Wide World of Sports NRL match of the round at 4:00 pm, which greatly increased ratings. The commentary team was Andrew Voss, Ben Ikin and Nick Curry.

The ABC had been unable (or unwilling) to broadcast games from locations outside south-east Queensland, as the cost of doing so was estimated to be $90,000 - more than double the cost of a Brisbane broadcast, so the Pride, Cutters and CQ Capras's home games had not been televised. Channel 9 agreed to broadcast one game from each of the three regional clubs, with the Pride's first home game broadcast from Barlow Park, Cairns in Round 13, Sunday 10 June 2012 against traditional rivals Mackay Cutters.

In 2012 the Pride appeared in three televised games:

- Round 6: Northern Pride lost to Tweed Heads Seagulls 22–24 at Piggabeen Sports Complex, Tweed Heads
- Round 12: Northern Pride lost to Ipswich Jets 14–38 at North Ipswich Reserve, Ipswich
- Round 13: Northern Pride beat Mackay Cutters 36–10 at Barlow Park, Cairns

=== Live Streaming ===
In 2011 the Pride began live-streaming their home games, starting with the last home game of the season (Round 22 against Tweed Heads). For the 2012 season, home games were live-streamed via the Pride website using video distribution service Rivus TV Ltd. Games were free for members to watch, and $5 per game for non-members. From Round 5 2012 away games were streamed through the website as well.
