= 2002 State of Origin series =

Australian rugby league series

- Won by: (series drawn; Queensland retained the title)
- Series margin: 1-1-1
- Points scored: 116
- Attendance: 178,252 (ave. 59,417 per match)
- Top points scorer(s): Lote Tuqiri (28)
- Top try scorer(s): Lote Tuqiri (5)

The 2002 State of Origin series saw the 21st time that the annual three-game series between the Queensland and New South Wales representative rugby league football teams was played entirely under 'state of origin' selection rules. It was the second drawn series in four years and being the second default title retention by Queensland, it ignited protests from the New South Wales camp eventually accepted by the NRL, for the introduction of extra-time to State of Origin matches was introduced to ensure a definitive result.

== Game I ==
Wednesday, 22 May 2002

New South Wales	32–4	Queensland
Andrew Johns (13 - 1t, 4g, 1fg); Brett Hodgson (6 - 1t,1g); Matthew Gidley (4 -1t); Jamie Lyon (4 - 1t); Timana Tahu (4 - 1t); Trent Barrett (1 -1fg)	(Report)	(4 - 1t) Lote Tuqiri

Stadium Australia, Sydney
Attendance: 55,421
Referee: Bill Harrigan
Player of the Match: Andrew Johns

A young and enthusiastic New South Wales side proved far too good for their older opponents when they ran away with a 32–4 win in game I. The result suggested a bright future for the Blues who unearthed a number of new stars in fullback Brett Hodgson, centre Jamie Lyon and forwards Luke Bailey, Steve Simpson and Australian Test hooker Danny Buderus. Lyon showed his worth early with a remarkable try in the 24th minute off an Andrew Johns grubber kick on halfway.

Johns was named man of the match but it was Hodgson who stood tall after many had questioned the ability of the diminutive fullback to withstand the physical demands of Origin. The Parramatta Eels fullback ran for a record 390 metres - more than twice that of any other player on the field - and capped his night with an 80-metre run from the scrumbase to score under the posts.

== Game II ==
Queensland winger, Lote Tuqiri was charged with a dangerous throw in an NRL match and was left off the Queensland team sheet so he could plead guilty at the judiciary, allowing him to serve his ban on the Friday and be available for Game II the following Wednesday.

Wednesday, 5 June 2002

Queensland	26–18	New South Wales
Lote Tuqiri (18 -3t,3g); Gorden Tallis (4 - 1t); Dane Carlaw (4 - 1t)	(Report)	(6 - 3g) Andrew Johns (4 -1t) Luke Ricketson (4 - 1t) Braith Anasta (4 - 1t) Shaun Timmins

ANZ Stadium, Brisbane
Attendance: 47,989
Referee: Bill Harrigan
Player of the Match: Chris McKenna

In a typical Origin script, Queensland managed to reverse the result in game II with a thrilling display to level the series. In a disastrous debut, Maroons centre Justin Hodges emulated the feat of New South Wales' Phil Duke of twenty years earlier when he gathered a Johns kick in the 27th minute and fired a pass in goal to Darren Lockyer, only to see the ball sail over Lockyer's head and Blues five-eighth Braith Anasta pounce to give his side the lead. Then in the 61st minute Hodges did it again for Luke Ricketson to score before he was eventually hauled from the field by coach Wayne Bennett as his confidence dropped.

On the other side of the field, Queensland centre Chris McKenna was playing the match of his life as he assisted winger Lote Tuqiri to a three-try haul.

== Game III ==
Wednesday, 26 June 2002

New South Wales	18–18	Queensland
Jason Moodie (8 - 2t); Andrew Johns (6 -3g); Steve Menzies (4 - 1t)	(Report)	(6 - 1t,1g) Lote Tuqiri (4 -1t) Shaun Berrigan (4 - 1t) Shane Webcke (4 1t) Dane Carlaw

Stadium Australia, Sydney
Attendance: 74,842
Referee: Bill Harrigan
Player of the Match: Allan Langer

It was in this match that Gorden Tallis performed a famous tackle on Blues fullback, Brett Hodgson, dragging and eventually tossing him out of the field of play by the collar like a rag-doll. In a dramatic end to one of the most exciting series in years, the Blues thought they'd stolen the game when Jason Moodie finished off a magnificent team movement with three minutes remaining to take an 18–14 lead. But Queensland back-rower Dane Carlaw's try leveled the score at 18-all after a dramatic 50-metre burst, ensuring the title stayed with the Maroons.

Queensland skipper Gorden Tallis' reaction in giving the one-finger salute to a section of the crowd, right behind the northern tryline where Carlaw's try was scored, became a major after-match talking point. Tallis gained some sympathy when it was revealed that he was objecting to an offensive sign about his mother. But many again raised questions about his capacity to captain Australia with debate raging over the choice between Tallis or Andrew Johns to succeed Brad Fittler. Days later Johns was chosen to lead Australia in the July Test against Great Britain.

== New South Wales squad ==
Position	Game I	Game II	Game III
Fullback	Brett Hodgson		
Wing	Timana Tahu		
Centre	Jamie Lyon		Matt Gidley
Centre	Matt Gidley	Shaun Timmins	
Wing	Jason Moodie		
Five-Eighth	Trent Barrett	Braith Anasta	Trent Barrett
Halfback	Andrew Johns (c)		
Prop	Luke Bailey		
Hooker	Danny Buderus		
Prop	Mark O'Meley		Jason Ryles
Second Row	Steve Simpson		
Second Row	Ben Kennedy	Nathan Hindmarsh	Steve Menzies
Lock	Luke Ricketson		
Interchange	Braith Anasta	Steve Menzies	Nathan Hindmarsh
Interchange	Bryan Fletcher		
Interchange	Nathan Hindmarsh	Scott Hill	
Interchange	Michael Vella		
Coach	Phil Gould		

== Queensland squad ==
Position	Game 1	Game 2	Game 3
Fullback	Darren Lockyer		
Wing	Lote Tuqiri		
Centre	Chris McKenna		
Centre	Darren Smith	Chris Walker	
Wing	Clinton Schifcofske	Justin Hodges	Robbie O'Davis
Five-Eighth	Shaun Berrigan		
Halfback	Allan Langer		
Prop	Shane Webcke		
Hooker	Kevin Campion	PJ Marsh	
Prop	John Buttigieg	Chris Beattie	Petero Civoniceva
Second Row	Gorden Tallis (c)		
Second Row	Petero Civoniceva	Dane Carlaw	
Lock	Dane Carlaw	Darren Smith	
Interchange	Chris Walker	Travis Norton	
Interchange	John Doyle	Steve Price	
Interchange	Carl Webb	Chris Flannery	Andrew Gee
Interchange	Andrew Gee		Brent Tate
Coach	Wayne Bennett		

== See also ==
- 2002 NRL season

== Sources ==
- Big League's 25 Years of Origin Collectors' Edition, News Magazines, Surry Hills, Sydney
