= Braith Anasta =

Australian rugby league footballer

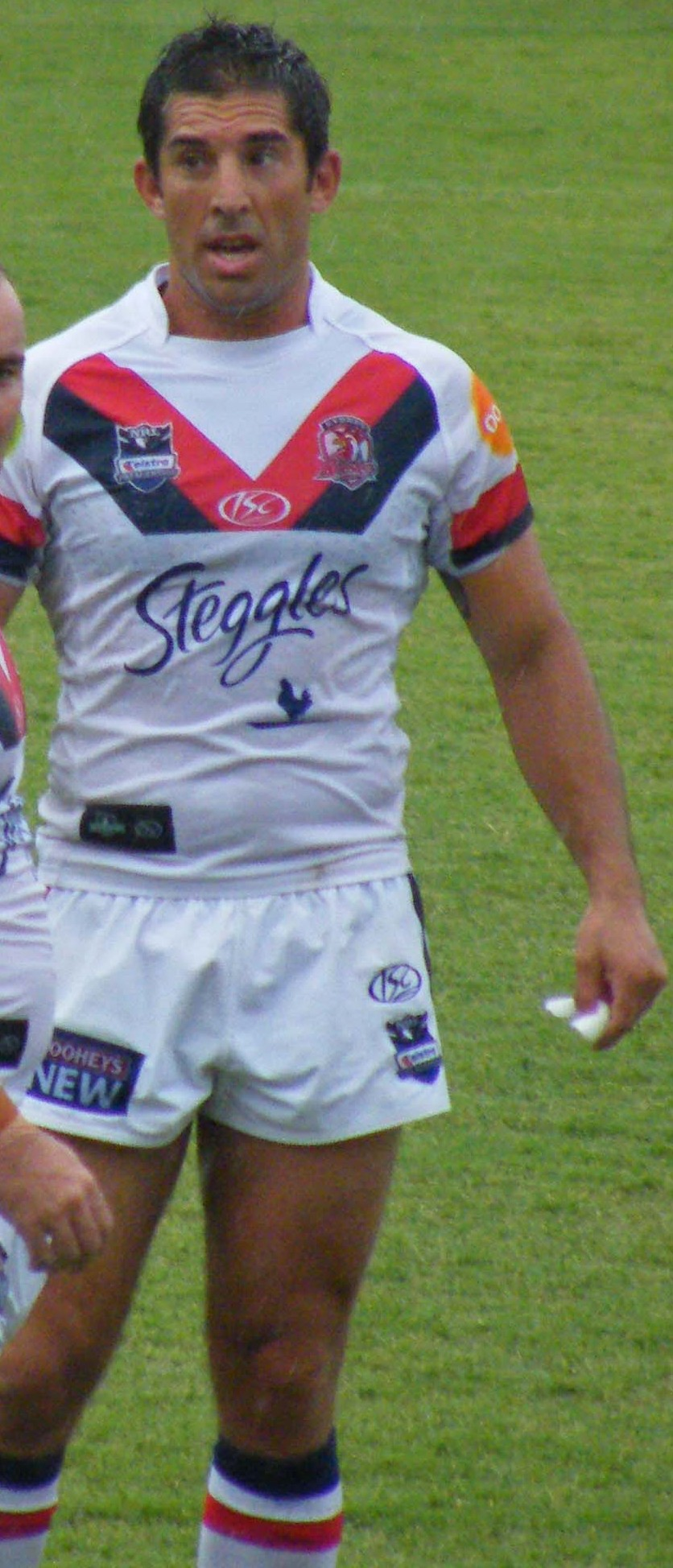

Personal information
- Full name: Braith Anastasakis
- Born: 14 January 1982 (age 44) Sydney, Australia

Playing information
- Height: 185 cm (6 ft 1 in)
- Weight: 97 kg (15 st 4 lb)
- Position: Five-eighth, Lock, Second-row
Club
Years	Team	Pld	T	G	FG	P
2000–05	Canterbury Bulldogs	110	50	2	10	214
2006–12	Sydney Roosters	147	36	116	6	382
2013–14	Wests Tigers	31	2	4	2	18
	Total	288	88	122	18	614
Representative
Years	Team	Pld	T	G	FG	P
2001	Australia	4	1	1	0	6
2002–08	New South Wales	10	2	0	0	8
2002–08	NSW City	7	0	0	1	1
2005–07	Prime Ministers XIII	2	1	0	0	4
2013	Greece	1	4	15	0	46

Braith Anastasakis (born 14 January 1982), better known as Braith Anasta, is an Australian television sports presenter and former professional rugby league footballer who played as a five-eighth and lock in the 2000s and 2010s. An Australian and Greek international, Anasta played in the NRL for the Canterbury Bulldogs, with whom he won the 2004 NRL Premiership, the Sydney Roosters and the Wests Tigers. He also represented New South Wales in the State of Origin series. He is the current host of NRL 360 on Fox Sports Australia.

== Early life ==
Anasta was born in 1982 in Sydney, as the younger of two sons. His father, Petros ("Peter"), was a Greek-Australian whose family came from Rhodes. His Anglo-Australian mother, Kim Anasta (née Piggins), is the sister of South Sydney Rabbitohs stalwart George Piggins. On 30 December 1997, Anasta's father died by suicide. Anasta grew up in Malabar playing rugby and golf. While attending Marcellin College Randwick, he played for the Australian Schoolboys team in 1999.

== Playing career ==
After playing his junior football for the Maroubra Lions (a South Sydney junior club), Anasta joined Canterbury ahead of the 2000 NRL season.

=== Canterbury-Bankstown Bulldogs (2000–05) ===
Despite spending a majority of his first season in Jersey Flegg, Anasta made his first grade debut at the age of 18 on 2 June 2000 against the Parramatta Eels at Parramatta Stadium, filling in for the injured Jason Hetherington. This was the only first grade game Anasta played in 2000, however he had a great deal of success with the Bulldogs Jersey Flegg side, helping them to a premiership victory over the Western Suburbs Magpies.

Anasta's breakthrough year came in the 2001 NRL season. He secured a regular place in the team at five-eighth, scored 13 tries in 24 games and helped the club finish second on the ladder at the end of the season. His season finished disappointingly however, as he missed the Bulldogs' semi-final against the Cronulla-Sutherland Sharks with a thumb injury. Despite this, his excellent form throughout the season earned him the Dally M Rookie of the Year Award and a spot on the 2001 Kangaroo Tour.

The 2002 season was one of turmoil for the Canterbury club, as they were stripped 37 competition points for breaching the salary cap. The impact was so heavy on the club that there was speculation that Anasta would switch codes and play rugby union if he was asked to take a pay cut by the Bulldogs. Despite this, the season was a good one for Anasta individually as he made his State of Origin debut, scored 10 tries and at 20 years and 145 days, became the youngest ever man to captain Canterbury-Bankstown.

In 2003, Anasta assisted Canterbury in coming out of the salary cap crisis as the club finished third on the ladder at the end of the season. While the season was indeed a relatively successful one for the Bulldogs, Anasta spent a fair amount of time on the sidelines, fracturing his sternum at the start of the season and fracturing his foot towards the end of the season.

The 2004 season saw Anasta claim his first NRL Premiership as Canterbury-Bankstown beat his future club, the Sydney Roosters, 16–13 in the 2004 NRL Grand Final to win their 8th title. Anasta was a vital player in the club's premiership season, playing 26 matches and scoring eight tries, including one in the Preliminary Final against the Penrith Panthers. At the end of the season, speculation was once again strong that Anasta was going to switch codes to rugby union and play for the New South Wales Waratahs in 2005, however Anasta opted to stay with the Bulldogs.

As 2004 NRL premiers, Canterbury faced Super League IX champions, the Leeds Rhinos in the 2005 World Club Challenge. Anasta played at five-eighth in the Bulldogs' 32–39 loss. 2005 was the final season of Anasta's contract with the club with Canterbury-Bankstown failing to make the top eight the year after winning the premiership. It was in round 18 of this season that Anasta scored his first and only hat-trick to date during the club's 26–24 win over the New Zealand Warriors at Mount Smart Stadium. Anasta played his last match for the Canterbury club on 4 September 2005 in a 32–12 loss to his future club, the Sydney Roosters.

Between 2000 and 2005, Anasta played 110 first grade matches for Canterbury-Bankstown, scoring 50 tries, kicking two goals and 10 field goals.

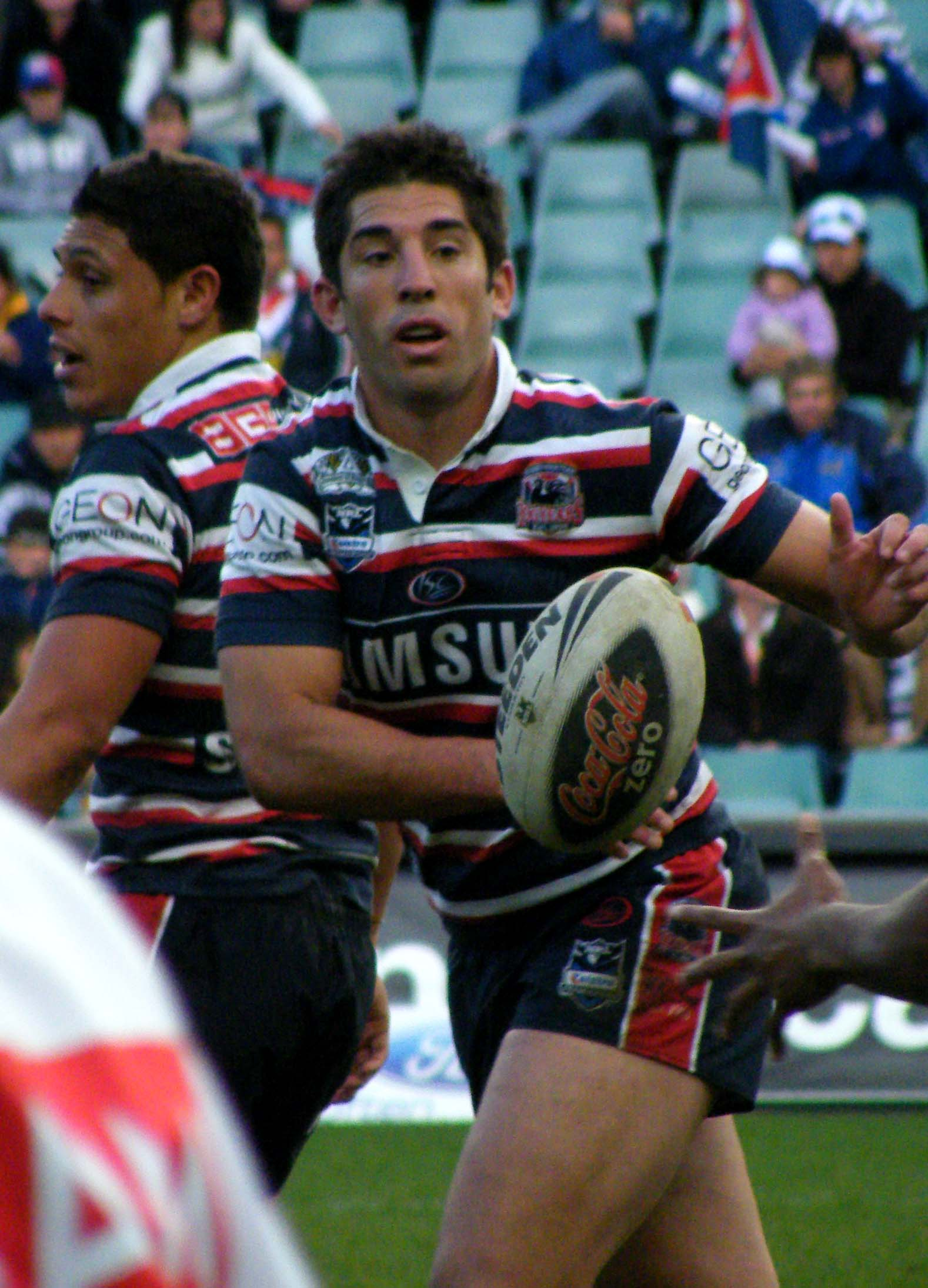
Anasta playing for the Roosters in 2008

=== Sydney Roosters (2006–12) ===
After Anasta's contract with Canterbury expired, the Sydney Roosters and the South Sydney Rabbitohs were seen as the two main contenders for his signature. The departure of Luke Ricketson, Michael Crocker, Jason Cayless, Chris Walker and Brett Firman ahead of the 2006 season allowed the Roosters to table a sizeable offer for Anasta. After months of speculation, on 13 July 2005, it was announced that Anasta had signed a three-year deal with the Roosters. Anasta claimed his move to the Roosters was not financially motivated and was "based upon the opportunity to work under Roosters and State of Origin Coach Ricky Stuart".

Anasta made his debut for the Sydney Roosters on 12 March 2006 against the South Sydney Rabbitohs at Telstra Stadium. His first season with the Roosters was a forgettable one as he failed to score a try in 16 appearances and missed the last part of the season with a groin injury. The Roosters also performed well below par, finishing 14th on the ladder and missing the top eight for the second year in a row.

The 2007 season was an excellent one for Anasta, and one of improvement for his team. The Roosters lost their first 5 matches of the season, Anasta was instrumental in helping the side reach 9th on the ladder as the Roosters just fell short of reaching the finals. Anasta's performances throughout the season were rewarded as he was nominated for Dally M Five-Eighth of the Year and won the Roosters' prestigious Jack Gibson Medal for Player of the Year as well as the Supporters Club Player of the Year Award. In the Roosters' last match of the 2007 season, Anasta attracted a fair amount of media attention after he was hit by South Sydney Rabbitohs forward David Fa'alogo in what he described as a "coward act". After the end of the season, it was revealed that Anasta had signed a contract extension with the Roosters to keep him with the club until at least the end of the 2011 season.

Partnering Mitchell Pearce in the halves, the 2008 season got off to a good start for both the Roosters and Anasta. Prior to the round 25 match against the South Sydney Rabbitohs, Anasta was give the captaincy of the club.

In 2009, Anasta made his first and only appearance at fullback, with coach Brad Fittler choosing to play Anasta in the position for the round 11 match against the Penrith Panthers. The club would finish the 2009 NRL season in last place on the table, the first time this had occurred since 1966.

In the 2010 NRL season, Anasta started off in the five-eighth position combining to form a combination with Mitchell Pearce and Todd Carney which allowed the Roosters to have a firm hold on a top eight position. Midway through the season, Anasta was moved to the lock position to allow Todd Carney to play in the halves. In the 2010 Qualifying Final against the Wests Tigers, Anasta scored a try and kicked the crucial field goal to send the match to golden point, a match the Roosters would go on to win in what was a career highlight for Anasta.

Anasta played in the 2010 NRL grand final and scored a try in a 32–8 loss to the St George Illawarra Dragons at Telstra Stadium.

On 7 March 2011, Sydney Roosters chairman Nick Politis announced the re-signing of club captain Anasta ensuring he will stay at the club for the next two seasons. Just over a year later, it was announced that Anasta would join the Wests Tigers for two seasons starting from 2013. Anasta said of this period, "I was not enjoying my footy where I was and a lot of other guys weren't, mind you. There wasn't a huge commitment there from them."

=== Wests Tigers (2013–14) ===
Originally Anasta was signed by coach Tim Sheens as a potential halfback, only for Sheens to be replaced by Mick Potter before the start of the 2013 season. "I got off to a bad start when Sheensy got sacked. He was the reason I came to the club and his sacking set me back straight away." Anasta later said.

With Potter playing Anasta in the second row, Anasta said, "I never said I didn't want to play back row. I said I preferred five-eighth, but I made a grand final and played some of my best football as a left-edge back-rower." Later he admitted that he was surprised to find himself playing in unexpected positions, and only hit form towards the end of the season.

Anasta made his first appearance in Wests Tigers colours in a pre-season trial against Parramatta Eels. Playing in the second row and without captaincy responsibilities, he scored two tries in the first half of an easy victory. He played in eighteen games over the regular season, scoring one try.

Anasta announced his retirement from rugby league via his commentary role on FOX Sports 1's NRL Super Saturday on Saturday 16 August 2014. He played his last game for the Wests Tigers in Round 17 against the Penrith Panthers.

Anasta would make a total of 31 appearances for the Tigers, scoring 2 tries, kicking 4 goals and 2 field goals. Then coach of the Tigers Mick Potter was quoted on Anasta's time at the club "During his two seasons at the Wests Tigers, Braith has been a real asset both on and off the field," Potter said.

"He has played a key role in helping develop younger players within the squad and I know that the young playmakers within the club have taken plenty of advice from him."

In 2017, Anasta opened up to Fox Sports about his time at the Wests Tigers and recalled it wasn't one of the happiest times in his life. He went on to say: "I didn't step foot [sic] in the joint (before signing) which is another major regret for me, didn't even step into the facilities to see what they were like. "I'm thinking they’ve got the same facilities, I'm thinking 'it's a first grade rugby league team, I'm not even questioning that'.

"It's not a shocking gym, but it's not like ... I just remember thinking 'wow, this is so far behind the times'. Little things like availability to Gatorade and water. "You'd only have a certain amount of Gatorade. You're talking about a team that trains three to four hours a day that has limits to their recovery. "A few times they didn't pay the bill for strapping tape. Which is just a necessity. Guys scavenging for tape to try and tape themselves up before a training session. "This was in 2013, it was bizarre. It was a dark place I don't know how anyone could be expected to play their best and that showed for a long period of time. "Pottsy (coach Mick Potter) did as much as he could, even he had his hands tied, because as I said, the joint was a debacle".

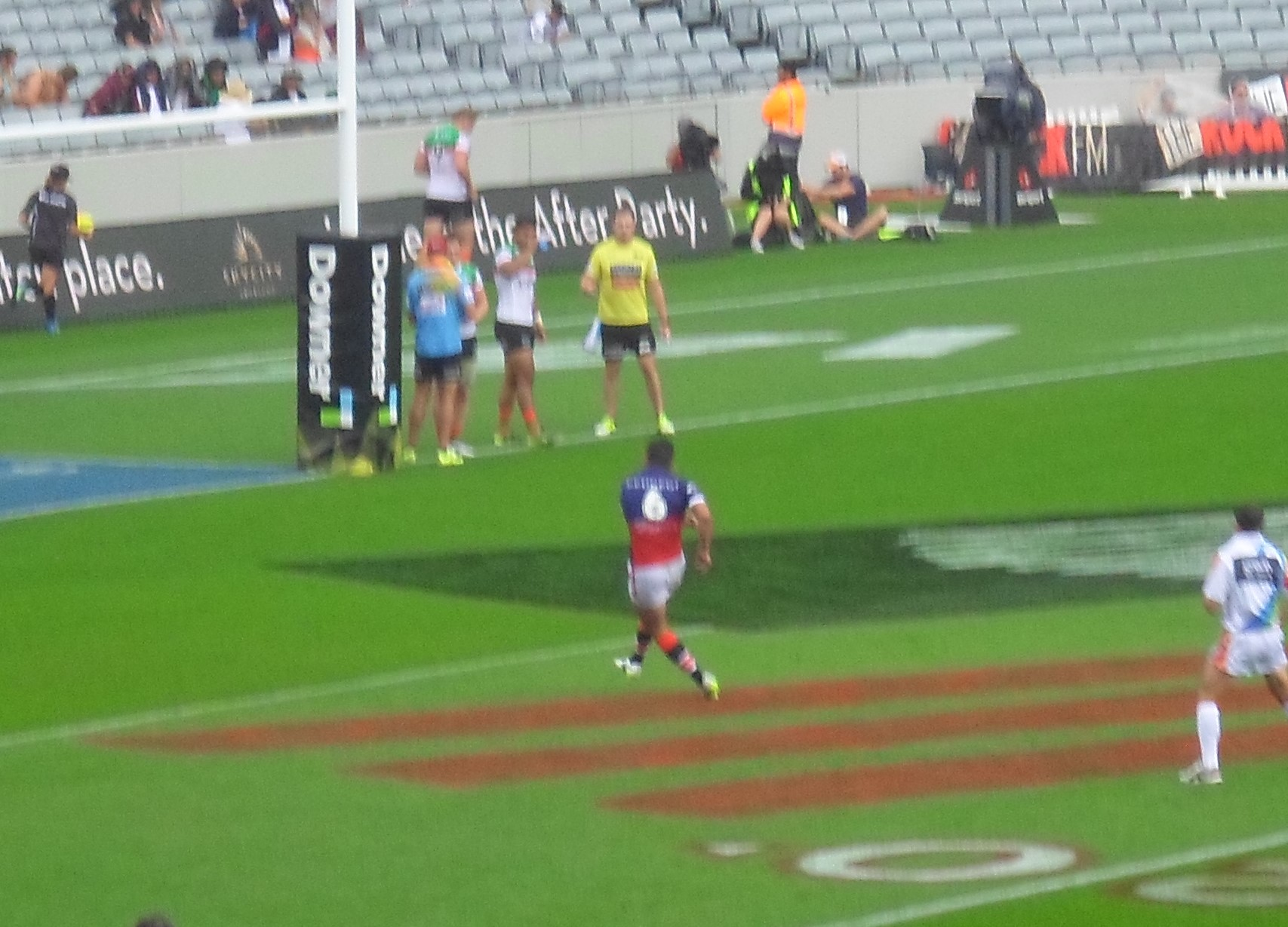
Anasta attempts a conversion at the 2016 NRL Auckland Nines

=== Sydney Roosters at the NRL Auckland Nines (2016) ===
The Sydney Roosters announced that Braith Anasta would captain their team at the 2016 NRL Nines in Auckland. Anasta appeared in all three games for the Roosters impressing on his return, scoring a try, kicking three goals and one field goal. This prompted speculation that Anasta would come out of retirement and return to the Roosters, Anasta responded "My days are over and I'm very happy with where I'm at,"

== Representative football ==
While his Greek heritage through his father made him eligible to represent the Greek national rugby league team, Anasta initially pledged his allegiance to his mother's country in Australia. Since 2001, Anasta has played representative football for City Origin, New South Wales and Australia.

=== Australia ===
After his outstanding 2001 season, Anasta was selected in the Australian squad for the 2001 Kangaroo Tour. It was on this tour that Anasta made his International debut, coming off the bench in Australia's 54–12 thrashing of Papua New Guinea at Lloyd Robson Oval on 7 October 2001. He was then selected in every match of Australia's 2–1 Ashes triumph over Great Britain. With Anasta coming off the bench in each game, Australia fought back from a 1–0 deficit, with Anasta helping the cause by scoring a try in Australia's 40–12 win in the second Test.

In August 2008, Anasta was named in the preliminary 46-man Kangaroos squad for the 2008 Rugby League World Cup.

=== New South Wales ===
Anasta was a regular in the New South Wales team from 2002. He made his Origin debut on 22 May in Game One of the 2002 series, coming off the bench as the Blues easily beat Queensland 32–4. Anasta was promoted to start five-eighth for Game Two of the series, filling in for the injured Trent Barrett. While he scored his first Origin try in the match, the Blues lost 26–18 and the series was levelled at 1–1. When Barrett returned from injury, Anasta was left out of the side entirely, with Scott Hill being favoured for the third match of what ended up being a tied series.

Shaun Timmins was preferred to Anasta as five-eighth for the 2003 series, however Anasta was selected as lock in Game Three after the Blues had already sealed the series. Anasta missed the 2004 series completely due to the return to representative football of Anasta's future coach, Brad Fittler.

While Trent Barrett was originally selected as New South Wales' five-eighth for the 2005 State of Origin series, his injury opened the door for Anasta to play in Game II. Down 1–0 in the series, Anasta helped the Blues come back to win the series 2–1, scoring a try in the decisive Game III at Suncorp Stadium. Anasta played the first two matches of the 2006 State of Origin series, however was dropped for the last match after the Blues had an embarrassing 30–6 loss in Game II. Despite this, Anasta returned for the first two matches of the 2007 State of Origin series before being ruled out for the third with a fractured finger.

Anasta has played 10 games for New South Wales, scoring two tries in total.

=== City Origin ===
Anasta made his City Origin debut on 10 May 2002 at Eric Weissel Oval, Wagga Wagga, in a 26–16 win for City. Anasta would make seven appearances for City over his career, winning a total of four series.

=== Greece ===
In 2013, Anasta made himself available to play for his father's country in Greece. He made his debut in a match against Hungary in Budapest, scoring four tries and kicking fifteen goals from as many attempts for a total of 46 points in the 90–0 victory. Anasta said, "To play for Greece was a proud moment for me, for my dad and grandparents. It was the first time I was in Greece beforehand and I loved it."

== Awards and honours ==
Individual

- 2001: Dally M Rookie of the Year
- 2005: Dally M Five-Eighth of the Year
- 2007: Jack Gibson Medal (Roosters Player of the Year)
- 2007: Supporters Club Player of the Year (Roosters)
- 2008: The Players' Champion
- 2010: Dally M Captain of the Year

Team

- 2002: State of Origin (New South Wales)
- 2004: Premiers (Bulldogs)
- 2005: State of Origin (New South Wales)

== Post-playing career ==
Anasta joined Fox Sports following his retirement from playing in 2015 where he has established himself as a regular commentator and analyst for Fox League, appearing in commentary and on Super Saturday and Sunday Ticket. Braith also regularly appears on The Golf Show. He is currently the host of NRL 360.

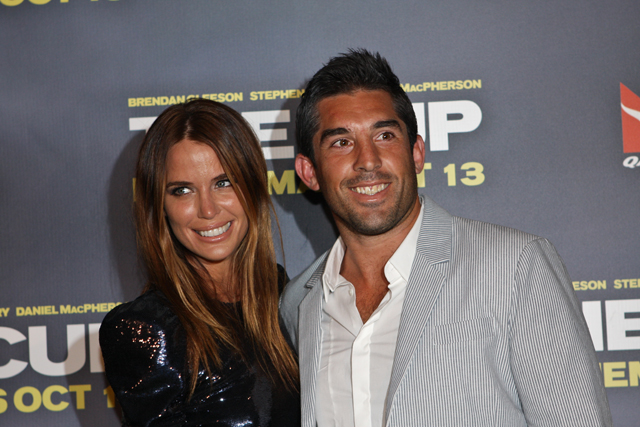
Anasta with his first wife Jodi Gordon (2011)

In 2018, Anasta established a sports management company called Searoo Sports, aimed at golf and rugby league athletes. Anasta said: "We've got so many talented athletes here, we've got to help them. I've learned a lot over the years, I want to mentor and help get them to the next level"

Anasta has been accused of a conflict of interest combining his roles as broadcaster at Fox and player manager. According to journalist Nick Tedeschi, Anasta "has used his platform to push his clients, an obscene conflict of interest that would not be tolerated in any other sport or any other industry." In May 2024 journalist Danny Weidler wrote this conflict was "particularly relevant when he discusses South Sydney, as he has had issues with the club due to the dropping of one of his clients, halfback Lachlan Ilias. The line between manager and media pundit is blurred." Weidler also alleged "Even some of Anasta’s closest colleagues are questioning his irritability and inability to handle criticism."

In May 2024, Anasta was involved in a verbal altercation with South Sydney player Latrell Mitchell at a Chinese restaurant in Surry Hills. Mitchell was reportedly angry over a perception of unfair criticism from Anasta towards himself and the South Sydney club.

== Personal life ==
Anasta became engaged to model and actress Jodi Gordon in July 2011 and the couple married on 14 October 2012. They have a daughter together, born 1 March 2014. On 11 December 2015, Anasta and Gordon confirmed their separation after three years of marriage.

Anasta starting dating personal trainer Rachael Lee in 2016. They welcomed their first child together, a daughter, on 21 January 2018. Lee also has a son from a previous relationship.

Anasta is an avid golfer playing off a handicap of +1. He received a playing invitation to compete in the 2011 New South Wales PGA Championship.
