= NRL 360 =

Australian sports TV program

- Genre: Sports
- Presented by: Ben Ikin (2013–2021); Paul Kent (2013–2024); Yvonne Sampson (2021); Braith Anasta (2022–present); Gorden Tallis (2023–present)
- Country of origin: Australia
- Original language: English
- No. of seasons: 12

Production
- Running time: 60 minutes

Original release
- Network: Fox Sports
- Release: 6 March 2013 – 2017
- Network: Fox League
- Release: 2017 – present

NRL 360 is an Australian nightly NRL talk show that deals with the issues in the NRL. It began airing on Fox Sports on 6 March 2013.

== Hosts ==
- Ben Ikin (2013–2021)
- Paul Kent (2013–2024)
- Yvonne Sampson (2021)
- Braith Anasta (2022–present)
- Gorden Tallis (2023–present)

== 2015 series ==
From Tuesday 3 March 2015, NRL360 moved from once a week on Wednesdays (30 episodes a season) to three nights a week (Tuesdays, Wednesdays and Thursdays) for a total of 90 episodes in 2015.

== 2016 series ==
In 2016, for the finals series, in addition to the regular Tuesday–Thursday broadcast, they decided an additional Monday night broadcast was added, with two journalists as well as Greg Alexander joining Ikin and Kent.

The final episode of 2016, the Thursday before the grand final and the day of the NRL fan day, they held a special live from the Sydney Opera House edition where they spoke to grand final captains, Paul Gallen and Cameron Smith, the grand final coaches Shane Flanagan and Craig Bellamy as well as the regular Thursday 'legends' Geoff Toovey and Billy Moore.

The 2016 NRL360 schedule was: (All 'nights' occur from the start of round 1 to the grand final week except for Mondays which is only aired in the finals weeks)

- Mondays — (Finals Only) Journalists night with Andrew Webster and Paul Crawley as well as Greg Alexander.
- Tuesdays — Players night with Benji Marshall and Michael Ennis (Current players)
- Wednesdays — Coaches night with Laurie Daley and Kevin Walters (State of Origin coaches)
- Thursdays — Legends night with Geoff Toovey and Billy Moore (Past players)

== 2017 series ==
The 2017 edition of NRL360 was moved to the new Fox League channel. NRL360 aired live on Mondays, Tuesdays and Wednesdays.

- Mondays — Coaches night with Laurie Daley and Kevin Walters (Current State of Origin Coaches), and Phil Rothfield
- Tuesdays — Players night with James Graham and Aaron Woods (Current Players), and Andrew Webster
- Wednesdays — Legends night with Billy Moore and Danny Buderus (Past Players), and Paul Crawley.

Whilst both the coaches remain the same, following the retirement of Michael Ennis and the move to the Brisbane Broncos by Benji Marshall, they were replaced by Canterbury-Bankstown and Wests Tigers captains James Graham and Aaron Woods. On Wednesdays, former Newcastle Knights legend and coach Danny Buderus replaced Geoff Toovey who had been appointed as head coach by the Bradford Bulls in the English Championship.

=== NRL 360 summer series ===
At the conclusion of the 2017 NRL season, it was announced that a grand final edition would be aired the Monday after the grand final. It was later revealed that a 'Summer Series' would air at 7:30 pm (19:30) on Monday nights until the end of the 2017 Rugby League World Cup.

- Mondays — Ben Ikin and Paul Kent joined by Phil Rothfield and Paul Crawley.

== 2018 series ==
It was announced that the series would begin earlier normally to provide off-season news and opinion starting on Monday 29 January. The regular series began a week prior to the first round under the following program.

- Mondays — Phil Rothfield, followed by Coaches night with rotating coaches including current and former NRL, Origin and International coaches.
- Tuesdays — Paul Crawley, followed by Players Night with Luke Lewis and Josh Reynolds
- Wednesdays — James Hooper, followed by Legends night with Billy Moore and a 'rotating legend' including Danny Buderus, Greg Alexander, Nathan Hindmarsh or Steve Roach.

== 2019 series ==
It was announced mid-season that the series would shift to the 7:30 pm AEST time-slot, an hour later than in previous years.

- Mondays — Phil Rothfield, followed by Coaches night with rotating coaches including current and former NRL, Origin and International coaches.
- Tuesdays — Paul Crawley, followed by Players Night with James Graham and Benji Marshall (Current Players)
- Wednesdays — James Hooper, followed by legends night with Billy Moore and a 'rotating legend' including Danny Buderus, Mark Carroll, Michael Ennis or Luke Lewis.

== 2020 series ==
With James Graham's move to Super League club St Helens mid-season, it was announced Damien Cook would take his place on Players night.

- Mondays — Phil Rothfield and James Hooper.
- Tuesdays — Paul Crawley and Brent Read, followed by Players Night with Damien Cook (previously James Graham) and Benji Marshall
- Wednesdays — James Hooper and Lara Pitt, followed by legends night with two legends out of Billy Moore, Mark Carroll, Greg Alexander, and Geoff Toovey, before Laurie Daley from the Big Sports Breakfast joins the panel.

== 2021 series ==
It was announced during Magic Round that Ray Hadley from 2GB would appear on the show. This series also marked the departure of Ben Ikin as co-host, after it was announced mid-season he would be the new Head of Football at the Brisbane Broncos. Ikin was replaced by Fox League presenter Yvonne Sampson.

- Mondays — Phil Rothfield and James Hooper.
- Tuesdays — Paul Crawley and Ray Hadley (previously Brent Read), followed by Players Night with James Graham and Benji Marshall
- Wednesdays — James Hooper and Lara Pitt, followed by Legends Night with two legends out of Billy Moore, Mark Carroll, Greg Alexander, and Geoff Toovey, before Laurie Daley from the Big Sports Breakfast joins the panel.

== 2022 series ==
It was announced that Braith Anasta would fill in for Sampson as co-host while she was on maternity leave.

- Mondays — Phil Rothfield and James Hooper.
- Tuesdays — Paul Crawley and David Riccio, followed by Players Night with former players James Graham and Benji Marshall
- Wednesdays — Phil Rothfield and Brent Read, followed by Legends Night with two legends out of Billy Moore, Mark Carroll, Benny Elias, Steve Roach, and Geoff Toovey, before Laurie Daley from the TAB joins the panel.

== 2023 series ==
Dan Ginnane filled in as co-host for two weeks while Braith was away at the 2023 Masters Tournament. After Paul Kent's arrest in May 2023, Gorden Tallis replaced him as co-host for the remainder of the season.

- Mondays — Phil Rothfield and Brent Read, followed by Cooper Cronk.
- Tuesdays — Paul Crawley and David Riccio, followed by Players Night with two current players.
- Wednesdays — James Hooper and Michael Carayannis, followed by Legends Night with two legends out of Billy Moore, Mark Carroll, Benny Elias, Steve Roach, and Geoff Toovey, before Laurie Daley from the TAB joins Braith and Paul.

== 2024 series ==
Paul Kent made his return as co-host after missing most of the 2023 series. On 28 April Kent was stood down after his involvement in a street fight and was replaced as co-host by James Graham temporarily until Gorden Tallis took over co-hosting duties.

- Mondays — Phil Rothfield and Gorden Tallis, followed by Cooper Cronk.
- Tuesdays — Brent Read and David Riccio, followed by Players night with two current players.
- Wednesdays — James Hooper and Michael Carayannis, followed by Legends Night with two legends out of Billy Moore, Mark Carroll, Benny Elias, Steve Roach, and Geoff Toovey, before Laurie Daley from the TAB joins the panel.

== See also ==
- List of Australian television series
- List of longest-running Australian television series
