= Chris McKenna (rugby league) =

Australian rugby league footballer

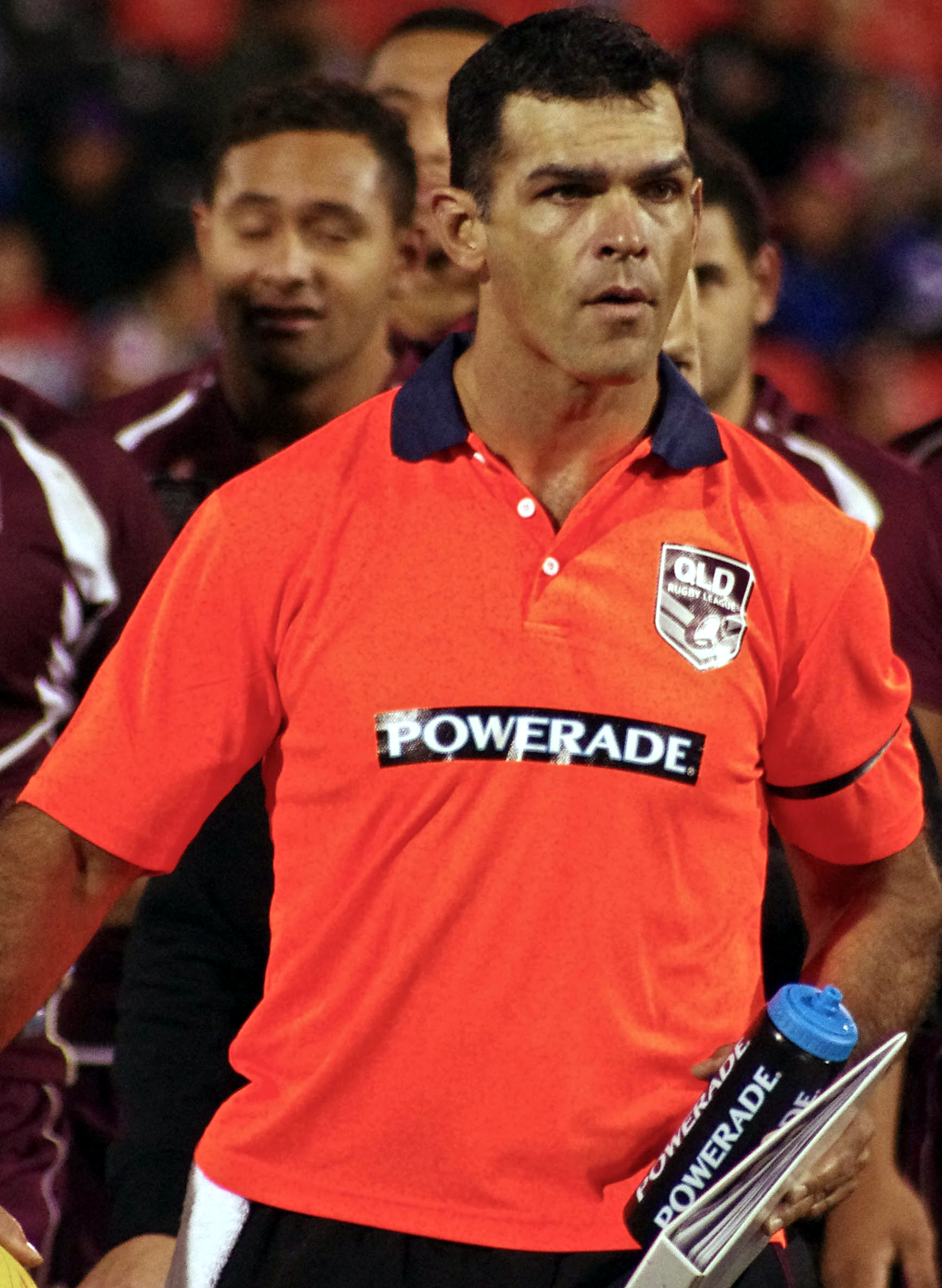

Personal information
- Born: 29 October 1974 (age 51) Brisbane, Queensland, Australia

Playing information
- Height: 190 cm (6 ft 3 in)
- Weight: 100 kg (15 st 10 lb)
- Position: Centre, Second-row
Club
Years	Team	Pld	T	G	FG	P
1993–94	Brisbane Broncos	13	4	0	0	16
1993–94	Sheffield Eagles	4	1	0	0	4
1995–96	London Broncos	29	3	0	0	12
1996	South Qld Crushers	29	3	0	0	12
1997–02	Cronulla Sharks	118	29	0	0	116
2003–05	Leeds Rhinos	80	24	0	0	96
2006–07	Bradford Bulls	52	7	0	0	28
2008	Doncaster RLFC	9	0	0	0	0
	Total	334	71	0	0	284
Representative
Years	Team	Pld	T	G	FG	P
1997	Queensland (SL)	1	0	0	0	0
1999–02	Queensland	7	0	0	0	0
2000–02	Australia	2	2	0	0	8

Chris McKenna (born 29 October 1974) is an Australian former professional rugby league footballer who played as a second-row forward and centre in the 1990s and 2000s.

He played for the Brisbane Broncos, South Queensland Crushers and Cronulla-Sutherland Sharks. His usual position was second row, though while he played in Australia he usually played at . He also played for Doncaster in National League Two having signed at the beginning of the 2008 from Bradford Bulls. He played for Queensland and Australia.

== Background ==
McKenna was born in Brisbane, Queensland, Australia and is of Irish and Guyanese descent, from his father who was born in Ireland and his mother who was born in Guyana. He is one of 11 children, who grew up in Wynnum-Manly in Brisbane.

== Biography ==
=== 1993 ===
McKenna made his first grade début for the Brisbane Broncos, as well as playing for the Sheffield Eagles. During the 1994 NSWRL season, McKenna played from the interchange bench for defending premiers Brisbane when they hosted British champions Wigan for the 1994 World Club Challenge.

=== 1994–1996 ===
He made appearances for the Sheffield Eagles and the London Broncos in the European competition as well as for the South Queensland Crushers in the Australian competition.

=== 1997–2002 ===
McKenna played in the centres for the Cronulla Sharks, and played for them in the only Australian super league grand final in 1997. In the second game of the 2002 State of Origin series he was named man of the match. At the end of that year, he joined the Leeds Rhinos from NRL side the Cronulla Sharks after a rumoured falling out with then coach Chris Anderson, and was the only 2002 Test player to move to Super League.

=== 2003–2005 ===
McKenna made his début for Leeds against Whitehaven in 2003, making an impressive start to his Rhinos career before picking up a pectoral injury which meant he missed a month of the season but left him in extreme discomfort for a number of months following the initial injury.

He returned to his best form at the back end of the 2003 season which also saw a switch to the pack. In his début season he scored just six tries in 25 appearances, however during the Rhinos' Super League winning season he improved on this with 9 tries in 25. In 2004 McKenna played 23 games for the Rhinos and scored 9 tries including 2 in the memorable 40–12 win over Bradford at Headingley, which also earned him the man of the match accolade. McKenna played for the Leeds Rhinos at second-row forward in their 2004 Super League Grand Final victory against the Bradford Bulls. As Super League IX champions, the Rhinos faced 2004 NRL season premiers, the Bulldogs in the 2005 World Club Challenge. McKenna played at second-row forward in Leeds' 39–32 victory. McKenna played for Leeds in the 2005 Challenge Cup Final at second-row forward in their loss against Hull FC.

In 2005 he has once again scored nine tries in 29 appearances. In total he made 80 appearances for Leeds, with four off the bench and scored 24 tries. He left Leeds at the end of 2005, scoring a try in his final appearance for the Rhinos at Headingley in the win over Wakefield Trinity Wildcats on the last day of the season and then made his last Rhinos appearance at centre in the 2005 Super League Grand Final defeat against Bradford Bulls.

=== 2006–2007 ===
McKenna joined the Bradford Bulls. It was announced in September 2007 that he would leave Bradford at the end of 2007 season.

He signed a two-year part-time contract with Doncaster starting from 2008.

=== Representative games ===
- State of Origin: Played 7 games in total for Queensland
- International: Played 2 Test matches (2000, 2002)
