= Phil Rothfield =

Australian sports journalist

- Born: Phillip Rothfield; 18 July 1958 (age 68)
- Other name: Buzz Rothfield
- Occupation: Sports journalist

Phillip Rothfield (born 18 July 1958), also nicknamed "Buzz", is a retired Australian sports journalist who specialised in covering rugby league writing for The Daily Telegraph in Sydney as an editor at large and appearing on NRL 360.

== Career ==
Rothfield mostly worked for News Corp Australia. Rothfield has been covering rugby league in Sydney since 1978 and has covered sport in other countries including England, the US, Russia, and Brazil. He retired in January 2026.

== Controversies ==
Rothfield was involved in a scandal where it was alleged he accepted cash payments into his TAB account from a gambler and former brothel owner Eddie Hayson. Rothfield later said this was a mistake which he learned from.

In another scandal, he was photographed with a lingerie model despite frequently criticizing rugby league players for behaviour in their private life.

Rothfield has a long running feud with Phil Gould. He has also had feuds with Michael Maguire, Peter Sterling and Warren Ryan. In 2017, he said “any journo doing their job has feuds".
