= Ben Ikin =

Former Australia international rugby league footballer

Personal information
- Full name: Benjamin Ikin
- Born: 21 February 1977 (age 49) Brisbane, Queensland, Australia

Playing information
- Height: 185 cm (6 ft 1 in)
- Weight: 90 kg (14 st 2 lb)
- Position: Centre, Five-eighth
Club
Years	Team	Pld	T	G	FG	P
1995	Gold Coast Seagulls	8	0	1	0	2
1996–99	North Sydney Bears	87	35	4	0	148
2000–04	Brisbane Broncos	55	18	2	0	76
	Total	150	53	7	0	226
Representative
Years	Team	Pld	T	G	FG	P
1995–03	Queensland	17	3	0	0	12
1998	Australia	2	0	0	0	0

Benjamin Ikin (born 21 February 1977) is an Australian former professional rugby league footballer, and the CEO of the Queensland Rugby League from 22 May 2023. He previously worked in football operations roles for the Brisbane Broncos from June 2021 until May 2023, and had been the host of talk show NRL 360 on Fox League as well as a commentator for the Nine Network and Fox Sports.

An Australian international and Queensland State of Origin representative centre turned five-eighth, Ikin played club football for the Gold Coast Seagulls, the North Sydney Bears and the Brisbane Broncos, with whom he won the 2000 premiership, before being forced into early retirement in 2004 by injury.

== Playing career ==
As a Gold Coast junior and promising centre and five-eighth, Ikin became the youngest player in State of Origin history when he was chosen as a replacement back for the Maroons during the troubled 1995 season at age 18.

Ikin's debut season ended prematurely when he was injured. However, he signed with the North Sydney Bears in 1996. Ikin made his debut for Norths in Round 1 1996 against his former club, the Gold Coast Seagulls, who had been Re-named Gold Coast Chargers, scoring a try in a 42-26 victory. Ikin finished the 1996 season as North Sydney's top try scorer. Ikin played in the club's shock preliminary final loss to St. George.

In the 1997 ARL season, Ikin made twenty-two appearances as Norths again reached another preliminary final but were defeated 17-12 at the Sydney Football Stadium by the Newcastle Knights.

In the 1998 NRL season, Ikin made twenty-five appearances for Norths as they reached another finals campaign but were eliminated in the minor semi-final against the Canterbury Bankstown Bulldogs 23-2 at North Sydney Oval. At the end of 1998, Ikin was chosen as a reserve in the final two Tests against New Zealand in September, making him the last international to be selected from the North Sydney club.

He then tried to gain a release from his contract to play with premiers the Brisbane Broncos in 1999, but his request was refused. Reluctantly playing with Norths, he suffered a broken jaw in an off-field incident that kept him sidelined for eight weeks. Ikin played in North Sydney's final game in the top grade which was against North Queensland in Round 26 at the Willows Sports Complex. North Sydney won 28-18.

In 2000, Ikin finally got the chance to link with Brisbane when North Sydney was forced into a joint venture with the Manly-Warringah Sea Eagles. He finished his first season with the Broncos playing five-eighth in the club's 2000 NRL grand final win over the Sydney Roosters. It was later revealed that he played the latter part of the season with a shoulder injury that required surgery during the 2000 off-season. In 2000, Ikin was awarded the Australian Sports Medal for his contribution to Australia's international standing in the sport of rugby league. Ikin also considered playing for Wales in the 2000 Rugby League World Cup due to his Welsh heritage through his grandfather

A mainstay of the Queensland State of Origin team, a further knee injury limited Ikin to just six matches in 2001 and ruined any chance of extending his Test record. Ikin made a successful comeback from his injury, even returning to State of Origin duty, but he had lost a lot of his speed and stood down from the Broncos' elite squad at the end of 2003. Playing for Broncos' feeder club the Toowoomba Clydesdales, Ikin was recalled into the Brisbane team during the 2004 representative season and played in eleven games in the latter half of the year.

Ikin's last NRL game was the 2004 elimination final against North Queensland which Brisbane lost 10-0 at the Willows Sports Complex.

== Post playing ==
Ikin was a rugby league commentator for the Nine Network and regularly appeared on The Sunday Footy Show. On 3 June 2009, he resigned from the Nine Network, due to A Current Affair running a story about his father's ill-fated storage business on the Gold Coast.

Until June 2021, Ikin was host of NRL 360 on Fox Sports alongside journalist Paul Kent. He started as Football and Performance Director for the Brisbane Broncos on 28 June 2021. In March 2023, that role changed to Head of Football Operations. In May, the Broncos confirmed that Ikin had completely ceased working at the club. Soon after, Ikin reportedly accepted the role of CEO for the Queensland Rugby League "midway through (the Broncos) season".

== Personal life ==
Ikin is married to Elizabeth (Beth) Bennett, the daughter of Wayne Bennett, who had coached Ikin at the Brisbane Broncos and in the Queensland State of Origin and Australian Test teams.

Ikin's middle brother, Sean, was a recording artist with Universal Records from 1999 to 2002. He recorded an independent album in London UK in 2005 called Gallery of Murmurs.

Ikin's youngest brother, Anthony, is a public speaker and life coach, as well as a five-time Australian aerobics champion and a top-twenty contestant in So You Think You Can Dance Australia (season 1).

== Sources ==
- Ben Ikin at NRL Stats
