= Rainforestation Nature Park =

Coordinates: 16°49′26.3″S 145°39′06.4″E

Rainforestation Nature Park Logo

Rainforestation's Army Duck Tour

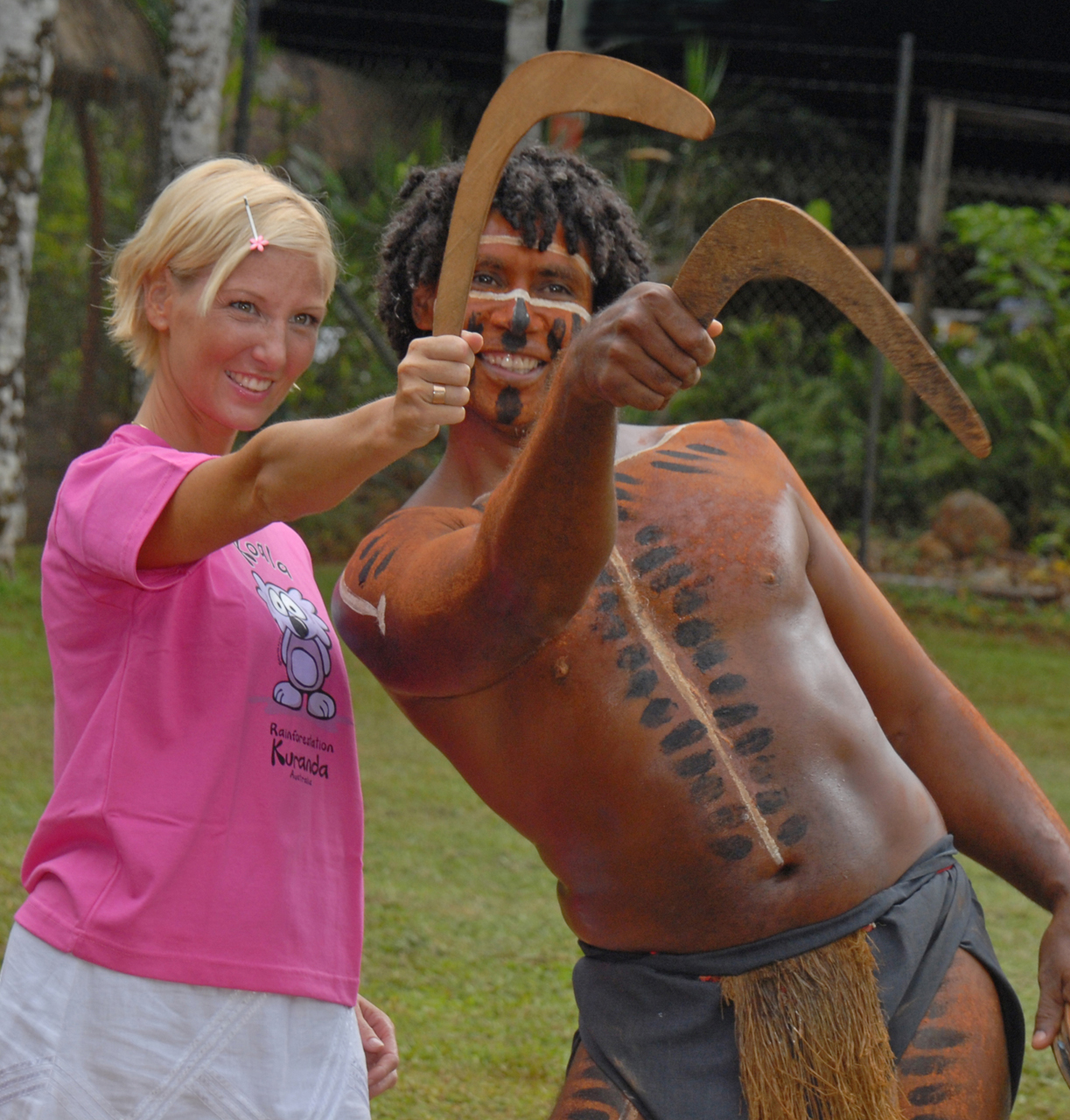
Boomerang Throwing on the Pamagirri Dreamtime Walk at Rainforestation

Rainforestation Nature Park is a tourist attraction near Kuranda in Far North Queensland, Australia. Set on 100 acres (40 ha) in the midst of World Heritage rainforest, the park (formerly Mountain Groves) opened in 1976. The site had previously been used as a coffee and orange plantation.

Rainforestation has since expanded significantly to give visitors insight into indigenous culture, Australian native wildlife and World Heritage-listed rainforest.

Rainforestation has three main components:

Army Duck Rainforest Tour – Operating since the park opened in 1976, visitors tour the rainforest aboard an amphibious World War II Army Duck (DUKW) as a guide explains the array of local plants and wildlife. The tour continues on a lake, and passes through a tropical fruit orchard, with over 40 different species of exotic tropical fruit trees.

Pamagirri Aboriginal Experience – Opened in 1993, Pamagirri means "silent snake". The Experience includes a performance by the Pamagirri Aboriginal Dance Troupe in a rainforest amphitheatre, and a Dreamtime Walk where visitors can learn to throw a boomerang and play a didgeridoo.

Koala & Wildlife Park – Opened in 1996, visitors can walk along elevated boardwalks to view native Australian animals, including crocodiles, koalas, kangaroos, wallabies, dingoes, wombats, cassowaries, lizards and snakes.
