= Danny Weidler =

Australian sports reporter

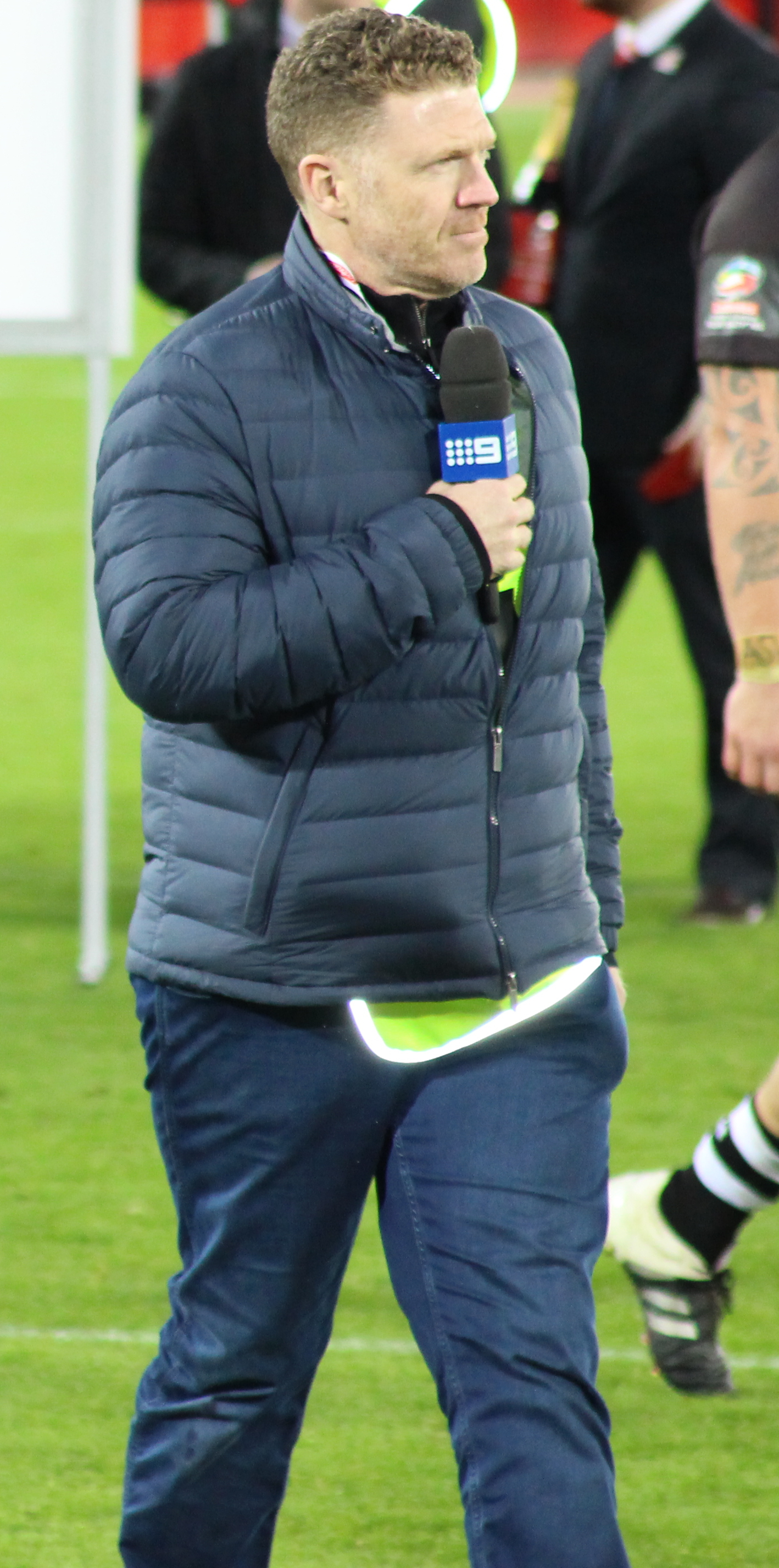
- Weidler in 2016
- Born: Daniel Weidler; Sydney, New South Wales, Australia
- Occupations: Reporter, journalist
- Years active: 1987–present
- Known for: Rugby league

Danny Weidler is an Australian sports gossip reporter He regularly appears on camera for the Nine Network delivering rugby league stories and does pieces for Nine's Footy Show (rugby league football). He contributes a weekly column for Sydney's Sun-Herald newspaper.

In 2006, Weidler won a Walkley Award in Sport News Reporting for a piece on National Nine News entitled, "Russell's Rabbits".
