= Saia Makisi =

Tonga international rugby league footballer

Personal information
- Born: 26 November 1981 (age 44) Lower Hutt, New Zealand
- Height: 6 ft 4 in (1.94 m)
- Weight: 17 st 5 lb (110 kg)

Playing information
- Position: Second-row, Centre, Wing
Club
| Years | Team | Pld | T | G | FG | P |
|---|---|---|---|---|---|---|
| | Cronulla Sharks |
| 2005–06 | Canterbury-Bankstown Bulldogs |
| 2006 | Western Suburbs Magpies |
| 2008 | Whitehaven | 24 | | | | 44 |
| 2008 | AS Carcassonne |
| | Villegailhenc-Aragon XIII |
| | Total | 24 | 0 | 0 | 0 | 44 |
Representative
| Years | Team | Pld | T | G | FG | P |
| 2002–06 | Tonga | 6 | 1 | 0 | 0 | 4 |
- As of 10 January 2021

Saia Makisi (born 26 November 1981) is a Tongan rugby league footballer who plays for Villegailhenc-Aragon XIII in the Elite Two Championship.

== Playing career ==
Saia has represented Tonga in six International games between 2002 and 2006 and scored a try against Cumbria in 2006.

Saia played for the New Zealand Residents sevens Team in the World Sevens competition in Australia in 2004 and was immediately signed up by Cronulla Sharks. He played for the Canterbury-Bankstown Bulldogs in the 2005 and 2006 NSWRL Premier League before signing for the Western Suburbs Magpies in the NSWRL Premier League and the Chester Hill Rhinos in the 2007 Jim Beam Cup.

He signed a twelve-month contract for Whitehaven for the 2008 National League One season. He left the club in September 2008, joining AS Carcassonne in France.
