= Jason Moodie =

Australian rugby league footballer

Personal information
- Full name: Jason Wade Moodie
- Born: 29 May 1974 (age 52) Narrabri, New South Wales, Australia

Playing information
- Height: 185 cm (6 ft 1 in)
- Weight: 88 kg (13 st 12 lb)
- Position: Wing
Club
Years	Team	Pld	T	G	FG	P
1997–99	Newcastle Knights	54	28	0	0	112
2000–03	Parramatta Eels	87	44	2	0	180
2004	Wests Tigers	23	10	0	0	40
2007	Wests Tigers	8	1	0	0	4
	Total	172	83	2	0	336
Representative
Years	Team	Pld	T	G	FG	P
2001	NSW City	1	0	0	0	0
2002	New South Wales	3	2	0	0	8

Jason Moodie (born 29 May 1974) is an Australian former professional rugby league footballer who played in the 1990s and 2000s. A New South Wales State of Origin representative wing, he played in the National Rugby League for the Newcastle Knights, Parramatta Eels and Wests Tigers.

== Playing career ==
Moodie made his first grade debut for Newcastle in Round 2 1997 against North Sydney. Moodie played 12 games for Newcastle in 1997 but did not play in the club's maiden premiership victory over Manly-Warringah.

Moodie joined Parramatta in 2000 and played in the club's preliminary final defeat against eventual premiers Brisbane.

Moodie then played for the Parramatta Eels in their 2001 NRL grand final loss to the Newcastle Knights. He was selected to play for New South Wales Origin in all three games of the 2002 drawn series. Moodie scored two tries in the tied third match.

Moodie retired from first grade competition in 2004 to become a firefighter but was unsuccessful in his application to join, he then became a glass delivery driver for two years before returning to spend another season with the Wests Tigers in 2007.
