= Paul Kent (journalist) =

Australian journalist

Personal information
- Born: 4 September 1969 (age 57) Orange, New South Wales, Australia

Playing information
- Position: Halfback
Club
Years	Team	Pld	T	G	FG	P
1989	Parramatta Eels	1	0	0	0	0

Paul Kent is an Australian rugby league podcaster and former journalist and rugby league footballer.

== Playing career ==
In 1989, he played in one first grade match for Parramatta at halfback, becoming the 481st player for the club. Kent played in lower grades for the North Sydney Bears.

== Media career ==
Since retiring, he became a journalist with the Sydney Morning Herald and then The Daily Telegraph. He has also become a presenter on NRL 360 for Fox Sports.

He has written two books; Sonny Ball and Johnny Lewis: The Biography — about Sonny Bill Williams and Johnny Lewis, respectively. Sonny Ball was chosen as one of the best sports books of 2015 by Australian newspaper The New Daily. Kent was a weekly panel member for Triple M's Sunday NRL Show.

Kent's opinions of Melbourne coach, Craig Bellamy, brought forth a response from the coach who claimed the accusations were disrespectful and out of line.

In May 2022, Kent left his position from radio station Triple M after he claimed to have a differing view to an on air incident with fellow presenter Anthony Maroon. Kent was asked to apologise over the incident in which Kent along with James Hooper bullied Maroon live on air. Kent refused to apologise to the station which resulted in him handing in his resignation. He later wrote an opinion piece on the incident in which he said, "We live in a world of snowflakes, sadly.”

In February 2023, it was reported in the Sydney Morning Herald that Kent had an altercation at the season launch for Kayo with journalist Mike Meehall Wood who had been critical of Kent. The article referred to Kent as "one of the angriest men in sports media".

== 2023 assault charges ==
In May 2023, Kent was arrested after he allegedly assaulted a woman following an argument at his home. He was charged with common assault and choking a woman without consent. He was temporarily stood down from his roles at The Daily Telegraph and Fox Sports. The woman was revealed to be an ex-girlfriend of Kent's.

On 17 May 2023, Kent plead not guilty to the charges, and the trial was set down for November. Kent told the media his employers "fully support me” and that he was "embarrassed about" the charges "but unfortunately it’s beyond my control so I’ll just let the court process see its way through now and once we get to the end then we can hopefully see some things through different eyes." Fox Sports removed the back catalogue of NRL 360 following the charges against Kent. NRL players such as Matt Lodge, James Maloney and Cameron King have argued that Kent has been treated by the media far more leniently than NRL players for reported bad behaviour. Paul Kent told the media "It's the rugby league soap opera. It’s the way it rolls. It’s my day in the storyline right now and that’s fine. People are entitled to their opinions.” This response, referring to an allegation of domestic violence as a soap opera, was criticised by Ray Hadley among others.

In 2016, Kent wrote an article about the Full Stop Foundation, an organisation hoping to end sexual assault and violence against women. He was an ambassador for the organisation. On 15 May 2023, Full Stop announced that a tweet by Kent from 2017 that "included a picture of Kent & commentary on his former ambassadorship which ended 6 years ago, has been deleted."

In November 2023, Kent was charged with a third domestic violence offence.

In September 2023, it was revealed Kent was working part-time as a limousine driver for a funeral home in Sydney while waiting for his case to be heard. On 12 December 2023, Kent was found not guilty of allegations he attacked and choked his then-partner at his home in Sydney’s inner west.

== 2024 restaurant fight ==
In April 2024, Kent was stood down from Fox Sports after being involved in a physical altercation outside a Totti's, a Balmain restaurant. Kent later claimed he was provoked by references to the domestic violence allegations, although this has been denied.

According to a report in the Sydney Morning Herald shortly after the incident, "Kent’s gradual unravelling during the past few months has been the talk of rugby league circles and has been well known to those who work with him at Fox."

Several days before the incident Kent had engaged in a discussion on NRL 360 about a scuffle in the tunnel between Reed Mahoney and Jack Hetherington during a Bulldogs vs Knights game. Kent was highly critical of the players, saying "I think the whole thing's embarrassing, I think the melees are embarrassing for the game... This sort of stuff where they all run in jumper-grabbing, I don’t think that covers anyone in glory, everyone just looks ridiculous doing it."

Kent's lawyer asked for the charge against Kent to be dealt with under the Mental Health Act. This prompted fellow journalist Danny Weidler to write a column referring to "Kent’s obvious problem with alcohol" and the fact "his behaviour during the past two years has been erratic, and many in rugby league have questioned the company he has been keeping." Weidler also claimed Kent "had privately expressed fears he may have been suffering from chronic traumatic encephalopathy (CTE)" caused by his careers in boxing and football, because of his "struggles with the anger he displayed most nights on TV, and sometimes away from it."

On 1 July 2024, Kent parted ways with Fox Sports. On 3 July Kent was sentenced to a two year good behaviour bond for his part in the fight.

In August 2024, Kent made an application to the Fair Work Commission, launching an unfair dismissal case against News Corp. Kent stated in his application that he had been dealing with a diagnosis of Asperger's syndrome which his lawyers stated was a disability. He also claimed that News had “tolerated or condoned the behaviour of other employees alleged to have engaged in misconduct over the course of their employment”. The case settled in September.

There has been criticism of Kent for using mental health grounds to defend his actions when Kent himself had frequently criticised players who did this. When asked to respond to this Kent stated:

What a lot of people don't get their heads around is there's a lot of nuances in this. So, it's easy to sit there and point those things out, and they sit back, you know, the fat heads sitting there feeling triumphant in what they've just posted, but there's all sorts of nuances in the whole thing. It's not as simple as that when you go to court. It's not as simple as what these dickheads can put into 140 characters. You want to sit there and make that allegation, make it, but you also don't understand it.

== Podcaster ==
Kent returned to media work in 2025 launching a podcast, Kenty, saying "I'm just gonna do my thing and do it my way."

In an early episode, Kent criticsed the NRL's "no fault stand down" policy, where players charged with serious criminal offences are automatically prohibited from playing until their charge is determined by a court. He argued this policy was a "failure" giving his own experience in 2024 as an example and arguing it "was too damaging on player's careers".
