= 2008 North Queensland Cowboys season =

Coordinates: 19°18′58″S 146°42′43″E

- NRL Rank: 15th
- Play-off result: Missed finals
- 2008 record: Wins: 5; draws: 0; losses: 19
- Points scored: For: 474; against: 638

Team information
- CEO: Peter Parr
- Coach: Graham Murray (resigned on 19 May); Ian Millward (interim)
- Captain: Johnathan Thurston
- Stadium: Dairy Farmers Stadium
- Avg. attendance: 18,102
- High attendance: 24,332 (vs. Brisbane Broncos, Round 25)

Top scorers
- Tries: Ashley Graham (10); John Williams (10)
- Goals: John Williams (96)
- Points: Johnathan Thurston (39)
← 2007	2009 →

The 2008 North Queensland Cowboys season was the 14th season in the club's history. They were coached by Graham Murray and captained by Johnathan Thurston, they competed in the National Rugby League's 2008 Telstra Premiership.

On 19 May, Murray resigned as head coach after just three wins from the opening 10 games. He was replaced by assistant coach Ian Millward, who took over as interim head coach until the end of the season. The Cowboys finished the season in 15th place, avoiding the wooden spoon by points differential.

== Season summary ==
The Cowboys entered the 2008 season optimistic about the finals chances after a preliminary final appearance in 2007. The club got off to the worst possible start, losing three straight games. They would win their next three but it proved to be a false dawn, as the side went on a club record 13-game losing streak. They finished the season with two wins from their final five games, finishing in 15th place and narrowly avoiding the wooden spoon. The season was plagued by injury, with key players Matthew Bowen, Luke O'Donnell, Matthew Scott and Johnathan Thurston all missing considerable playing time due to injuries.

On April 2, the Cowboys signed former assistant coach and then-Canberra Raiders coach Neil Henry as their head coach for the 2009 season. A month later, Graham Murray re-signed as head coach and was replaced by his assistant Ian Millward as interim head coach for the rest of 2008. Millward's first win as head coach occurred in Round 22, as the Cowboys defeated the Canterbury Bulldogs 36–12 at Suncorp Stadium.

Despite the poor season, the club still maintained the fourth highest home crowd average in the NRL with an average of 18,102.

=== Milestones ===
- Round 1: Matthew Scott played his 50th game for the club.
- Round 1: Travis Burns and Ben Harris made their debuts for the club.
- Round 2: Dayne Weston made his debut for the club.
- Round 2: Obe Geia made his NRL debut.
- Round 4: Anthony Watts and John Williams made their debuts for the club.
- Round 8: Daniel Abraham made his debut for the club.
- Round 14: Nick Slyney made his NRL debut.
- Round 15: Greg Byrnes made his NRL debut.
- Round 16: Ashley Graham played his 50th game for the club.
- Round 16: Brandon Boor and Sam Bowie made their NRL debuts.
- Round 19: Luke Harlen made his debut for the club.
- Round 21: The club recorded their longest losing streak with their 13th straight loss.
- Round 22: Ray Cashmere played his 50th game for the club.
- Round 25: Shane Tronc played his 100th game for the club.

== Squad list ==
North Queensland Cowboys NRL squad 2008
First team squad				Coaching staff
Daniel Abraham – SR; Daniel Backo – PR; Matthew Bartlett – SR; Scott Bolton – SR; Brandon Boor – CE; Matthew Bowen – FB; Sam Bowie – WG; Travis Burns – FE; Greg Byrnes – PR; Ray Cashmere – PR	David Faiumu – HK; Ben Farrar – CE; Sione Faumuina – SR; Sam Faust – PR; John Frith – SR; George Gatis – HK; Obe Geia – WG; Ashley Graham – WG; Luke Harlen – PR; Ben Harris – CE	Mark Henry – CE; Keiron Lander – LK; Jacob Lillyman – PR; Jackson Nicolau – FE; Luke O'Donnell – LK; Aaron Payne – HK; Anthony Perkins – CE; Matthew Scott – PR; Chris Sheppard – HB; Nick Slyney – LK	Justin Smith – FE; Steve Southern – SR; Johnathan Thurston (c) – HB; Shane Tronc – PR; Ben Vaeau – PR; Anthony Watts – HK; Carl Webb – PR; Dayne Weston – PR; John Williams – WG; Ty Williams – WG	Head coach: Ian Millward (Interim); Assistant coaches: Matt Parish (assistant coach); Paul Bowman (assistant coach); Glen Murphy (strength & conditioning coach); Legend: (c) Captain(s); (vc) Vice-captain(s)

== Squad movement ==
=== 2008 gains ===
Player	Signed from	Until end of
Daniel Abraham	Newcastle Knights	2008
Travis Burns	Manly Sea Eagles	2009
George Gatis	Huddersfield Giants (mid-season)	
Ben Harris	Bradford Bulls	2010
Chris Sheppard	Northern Pride (mid-season)	2008
Anthony Perkins	Melbourne Storm	2009
Anthony Watts	Cronulla Sharks	2010
Dayne Weston	Cronulla Sharks	2009
John Williams	Sydney Roosters	2010

=== 2008 losses ===
Player	Signed to	Until end of
Daniel Abraham	Mackay Cutters (mid-season)	
Brett Anderson	Melbourne Storm	2009
Brenton Bowen	Gold Coast Titans	2009
Paul Bowman	Retired	-
David Faiumu	Huddersfield Giants (mid-season)	2009
Jamie Frizzo	Northern Pride (mid-season)	
Karl Johnson	Newcastle Knights	2008
Scott Minto	Retired	-
Shane Muspratt	Mackay Cutters	2008
Jason Smith	Retired	-
Neil Sweeney	Newcastle Knights	2008
Colin Wilkie	Released	-

== Ladder ==
2008 NRL season
Pos	Team	Pld	W	D	L	B	PF	PA	PD	Pts
1	Melbourne Storm	24	17	0	7	2	584	282	+302	38
2	Manly Warringah Sea Eagles (P)	24	17	0	7	2	645	355	+290	38
3	Cronulla-Sutherland Sharks	24	17	0	7	2	451	384	+67	38
4	Sydney Roosters	24	15	0	9	2	511	446	+65	34
5	Brisbane Broncos	24	14	1	9	2	560	452	+108	33
6	Canberra Raiders	24	13	0	11	2	640	527	+113	30
7	St George Illawarra Dragons	24	13	0	11	2	489	378	+111	30
8	New Zealand Warriors	24	13	0	11	2	502	567	-65	30
9	Newcastle Knights	24	12	0	12	2	516	486	+30	28
10	Wests Tigers	24	11	0	13	2	528	560	-32	26
11	Parramatta Eels	24	11	0	13	2	501	547	-46	26
12	Penrith Panthers	24	10	1	13	2	504	611	-107	25
13	Gold Coast Titans	24	10	0	14	2	476	586	-110	24
14	South Sydney Rabbitohs	24	8	0	16	2	453	666	-213	20
15	North Queensland Cowboys	24	5	0	19	2	474	638	-164	14
16	Canterbury-Bankstown Bulldogs	24	5	0	19	2	433	782	-349	14

== Fixtures ==
=== Pre-season ===
Date	Round	Opponent	Venue	Score	Tries	Goals	Attendance
16 February	Trial 1	Brisbane Broncos	Browne Park	10 – 20	Nicolau, Thompson	Nicolau (1/2)	-
23 February	Trial 2	Gold Coast Titans	Barlow Park	22 – 30	Webb (2), Faust, T Williams	Graham (3/4)	-
1 March	Trial 3	Canberra Raiders	Dairy Farmers Stadium	32 – 12	O'Donnell (3), Bowen, Southern, Webb	Graham (3/4), Burns (1/2)	-

=== Regular season ===
Date	Round	Opponent	Venue	Score	Tries	Goals	Attendance
14 March	Round 1	Gold Coast Titans	Skilled Park	18 – 36	Thurston (2), Harris	Thurston (3/3)	26,974
22 March	Round 2	Wests Tigers	Dairy Farmers Stadium	10 – 30	Graham, Harris	Thurston (1/2)	20,655
28 March	Round 3	Brisbane Broncos	Suncorp Stadium	2 – 36	-	Thurston (1/1)	50,612
5 April	Round 4	Parramatta Eels	Dairy Farmers Stadium	38 – 14	Graham, Henry, Lillyman, Smith, Watts, Webb	Thurston (7/7)	19,231
12 April	Round 5	St George Illawarra Dragons	WIN Stadium	20 – 16	Smith, Thurston, Watts	Thurston (4/4)	11,639
19 April	Round 6	Warriors	Dairy Farmers Stadium	48 – 20	Bowen (3), Harris (2), Graham, Smith, Southern, J Williams	Thurston (6/8), Graham (0/1)	20,544
26 April	Round 7	Melbourne Storm	Dairy Farmers Stadium	10 – 12	Henry, J Williams	Thurston (1/2)	24,053
4 May	Round 8	South Sydney Rabbitohs	ANZ Stadium	24 – 28	Graham, Vaeau, Webb, J Williams	Thurston (4/4)	9,818
10 May	Round 9	Cronulla Sharks	Dairy Farmers Stadium	18 – 24	Henry, O'Donnell, Webb	Thurston (3/3)	17,065
17 May	Round 10	Manly Sea Eagles	Central Coast Stadium	6 – 38	Farrar	J Williams (1/1)	9,343
	Round 11	Bye					
31 May	Round 12	Penrith Panthers	Dairy Farmers Stadium	18 – 19	Abraham, Burns, Graham	Thurston (3/4)	16,553
7 June	Round 13	Wests Tigers	Campbelltown Stadium	16 – 40	Harris, Slyney, T Williams	J Williams (2/3)	10,488
16 June	Round 14	Newcastle Knights	Dairy Farmers Stadium	18 – 30	Farrar (2), Bartlett	Thurston (3/4)	14,234
21 June	Round 15	Melbourne Storm	Olympic Park	20 – 48	Cashmere, Henry, Webb, J Williams	Thurston (2/4)	10,880
28 June	Round 16	South Sydney Rabbitohs	Dairy Farmers Stadium	28 – 29	Graham (2), Cashmere, Harris, J Williams	J Williams (4/5)	15,631
	Round 17	Bye					
12 July	Round 18	Warriors	Mt Smart Stadium	14 – 24	J Williams (2), Graham	Thurston (1/3)	7,772
18 July	Round 19	Brisbane Broncos	Dairy Farmers Stadium	18 – 32	Southern, Tronc, J Williams	J Williams (3/3)	22,048
25 July	Round 20	Parramatta Eels	Parramatta Stadium	4 – 16	J Williams	J Williams (0/1)	7,253
2 August	Round 21	Sydney Roosters	Dairy Farmers Stadium	20 – 32	Henry, O'Donnell, Weston, T Williams	Thurston (2/4)	14,601
9 August	Round 22	Canterbury Bulldogs	Suncorp Stadium	36 – 12	T Williams (2), Burns, Cashmere, Faumuina, Graham, Webb	J Williams (4/7)	8,549
16 August	Round 23	Gold Coast Titans	Dairy Farmers Stadium	20 – 26	O'Donnell, Weston, J Williams, T Williams	J Williams (2/4)	17,605
23 August	Round 24	Newcastle Knights	EnergyAustralia Stadium	24 – 38	O'Donnell (2), Payne, T Williams	J Williams (4/4)	10,323
30 August	Round 25	Canberra Raiders	Dairy Farmers Stadium	22 – 10	Burns, Harris, Thurston, Webb	J Williams (3/4)	14,998
6 September	Round 26	Cronulla Sharks	Toyota Stadium	22 – 28	Graham, Scott, Tronc, T Williams	J Williams (3/3), Thurston (0/1)	7,057
Legend: Win Loss Draw Bye

== Statistics ==
Name	App	T	G	FG	Pts
Daniel Abraham	6	1	-	-	4
Matthew Bartlett	6	1	-	-	4
Scott Bolton	4	-	-	-	-
Brandon Boor	2	-	-	-	-
Matthew Bowen	6	3	-	-	12
Sam Bowie	1	-	-	-	-
Travis Burns	14	3	-	-	12
Greg Byrnes	3	-	-	-	-
Ray Cashmere	24	3	-	-	12
David Faiumu	4	-	-	-	-
Ben Farrar	18	3	-	-	12
Sione Faumuina	14	1	-	-	4
Sam Faust	10	-	-	-	-
George Gatis	1	-	-	-	-
Obe Geia	2	-	-	-	-
Ashley Graham	22	10	-	-	40
Luke Harlen	5	-	-	-	-
Ben Harris	24	7	-	-	28
Mark Henry	23	5	-	-	20
Jacob Lillyman	11	1	-	-	4
Jackson Nicolau	1	-	-	-	-
Luke O'Donnell	15	5	-	-	20
Aaron Payne	24	1	-	-	4
Matthew Scott	6	1	-	-	4
Chris Sheppard	1	-	-	-	-
Nick Slyney	2	1	-	-	4
Justin Smith	11	3	-	-	12
Steve Southern	18	2	-	-	8
Johnathan Thurston	17	4	39	-	94
Shane Tronc	18	2	-	-	8
Ben Vaeau	11	1	-	-	4
Anthony Watts	12	2	-	-	8
Carl Webb	21	6	-	-	24
Dayne Weston	19	2	-	-	8
John Williams	20	10	28	-	96
Ty Williams	12	7	-	-	28
Totals		85	67	0	474

== Representatives ==
The following players played a representative match in 2008.

	City vs Country	ANZAC Test	State of Origin 1	State of Origin 2	State of Origin 3	Prime Minister's XIII	Indigenous v Māori	World Cup
Ray Cashmere	City	-	-	-	-	-	-	-
Ben Harris	Country	-	-	-	-	-	-	-
Jacob Lillyman	-	-	Queensland	-	-	-	-	-
Luke O'Donnell	-	-	-	-	-	Prime Minister's XIII	-	-
Johnathan Thurston	-	Australia	Queensland	Queensland	Queensland	-	-	Australia
Carl Webb	-	Australia	Queensland	-	-	Prime Minister's XIII	Indigenous	-
Ty Williams	-	-	-	-	-	-	Indigenous	-

== Honours ==
=== League ===
- Wally Lewis Medal: Johnathan Thurston

=== Club ===
- Paul Bowman Medal: Aaron Payne
- Player's Player: Aaron Payne
- Club Person of the Year: Aaron Payne
- Rookie of the Year: Nick Slyney
- Most Improved: Brandon Boor
- NYC Player of the Year: Nick Slyney

== Feeder clubs ==
=== National Youth Competition ===
- North Queensland Cowboys - 16th, wooden spoon

=== Queensland Cup ===
- Mackay Cutters - 9th, missed finals
- Northern Pride - 3rd, lost preliminary final
