= 2009 North Queensland Cowboys season =

Coordinates: 19°18′58″S 146°42′43″E

- NRL Rank: 12th
- Play-off result: Missed finals
- 2009 record: Wins: 11; draws: 0; losses: 13
- Points scored: For: 558; against: 474

Team information
- CEO: Peter Parr
- Coach: Neil Henry
- Captain: Johnathan Thurston
- Stadium: Dairy Farmers Stadium
- Avg. attendance: 17,309
- High attendance: 24,332 (vs. Brisbane Broncos, Round 25)

Top scorers
- Tries: Matthew Bowen (12); Willie Tonga (12)
- Goals: Johnathan Thurston (79)
- Points: Johnathan Thurston (202)
← 2008	2010 →

The 2009 North Queensland Cowboys season was the 15th season in the club's history. Coached by Neill Henry and captained by Johnathan Thurston, they competed in the National Rugby League's 2009 Telstra Premiership and finished the regular season 12th place, failing to reach the finals for the second consecutive year.

== Season summary ==
The 2009 season was an improvement on 2008 for the Cowboys, with 11 wins from 24 games. The closeness of the 2009 season meant the Cowboys finished 12th, just three points behind eventual Grand Finalists Parramatta, who finished 8th.

Neil Henry re-joined the club as head coach in 2009, taking over from interim head coach Ian Millward. Henry was an assistant coach at the club from 2002 to 2006, before moving to the Canberra Raiders in 2007 and winning the Dally M Coach of the Year award in 2008. Renowned strength and conditioning coach Billy Johnstone also returned to the club after a stint at the Gold Coast Titans. The club's key off-season recruits included Australian and Queensland representatives Willie Tonga, Antonio Kaufusi and Shannon Hegarty.

After a slow start to the season, the Cowboys enjoyed a strong run of form that included a four-game winning streak. With five rounds to play, they were sitting inside the top eight in 6th position. The club then endured four-game losing streak to end the season, dropping to 12th place.

2009 saw the debut of James Tamou, who joined the club from the Sydney Roosters under-20's side. Tamou would become an Australian and New South Wales representative at the Cowboys and play integral role in the club's maiden premiership victory in 2015.

=== Milestones ===
- Round 1: Shannon Hegarty, Antonio Kaufusi, Manase Manuokafoa and Willie Tonga made their debuts for the club.
- Round 2: Grant Rovelli made his debut for the club.
- Round 5: Steve Southern played his 100th game for the club.
- Round 5: Steve Rapira made his NRL debut.
- Round 8: James Tamou made his NRL debut.
- Round 15: Michael Bani made his debut for the club.
- Round 17: Luke O'Donnell played his 100th game for the club.
- Round 17: Johnathan Thurston played his 100th game for the club.
- Round 17: Aaron Payne played his 150th game for the club.
- Round 22: Donald Malone made his NRL debut.
- Round 26: Ray Thompson made his NRL debut.

== Squad List ==
North Queensland Cowboys NRL Squad 2009
First team squad			Coaching staff
Mitch Achurch – PR; Clint Amos – HK; Michael Bani – WG; Matthew Bartlett – SR; Scott Bolton – SR; Brandon Boor – CE; Matthew Bowen – FB; Travis Burns – FE; Ben Farrar – CE; Ashley Graham – WG; Ben Harris – CE; Shannon Hegarty – CE	Antonio Kaufusi – PR; Donald Malone – CE; Manase Manuokafoa – PR; Luke O'Donnell – LK; David Pangai – PR; Aaron Payne – HK; Anthony Perkins – CE; Steve Rapira – PR; Grant Rovelli – HB; Matthew Scott – PR; Nick Slyney – LK; Steve Southern – SR	James Tamou – PR; Ray Thompson – HB; Johnathan Thurston (c) – HB; Willie Tonga – CE; Shane Tronc – PR; Anthony Watts – HK; Carl Webb – PR; Dayne Weston – PR; John Williams – WG; Ty Williams – WG	Head coach: Neil Henry; Assistant coaches: Mick Crawley (assistant coach); Matt Parish (assistant coach); Billy Johnstone (strength & conditioning coach); Glen Murphy (Athletic Performance Manager); Legend: (c) Captain(s); (vc) Vice-captain(s)

== Squad Movement ==
=== 2009 Gains ===
Player	Signed From	Until end of
Mitch Achurch	Wests Tigers	2010
Clint Amos	Gold Coast Titans	2010
Michael Bani	Manly Sea Eagles (mid-season)	2011
Shannon Hegarty	South Sydney Rabbitohs	2009
Antonio Kaufusi	Melbourne Storm	2011
Donald Malone	Ipswich Jets	2010
Manase Manuokafoa	South Sydney Rabbitohs	2011
David Pangai	Sydney Roosters	2009
Steve Rapira	Warriors	2010
Grant Rovelli	Warriors	2010
James Tamou	Sydney Roosters	2010
Willie Tonga	Canterbury Bulldogs	2012

=== 2009 Losses ===
Player	Signed To	Until end of
Daniel Backo	Released	-
Greg Byrnes	Northern Pride	2009
Ray Cashmere	Salford City Reds	2010
Ben Farrar	Manly Sea Eagles (mid-season)	2010
Sione Faumuina	Castleford Tigers	2010
Sam Faust	Central Tigers	2009
John Frith	Released	-
George Gatis	Retired	-
Luke Harlen	Northern Pride	2009
Mark Henry	Salford City Reds	2010
Keiron Lander	Ipswich Jets	2010
Jacob Lillyman	Warriors	2010
Jackson Nicolau	Gold Coast Titans	2009
Chris Sheppard	Northern Pride	2010
Justin Smith	Retired	-
Ben Vaeau	Easts Tigers	2010

== Ladder ==
2009 NRL season
Pos	Team	Pld	W	D	L	B	PF	PA	PD	Pts
1	St. George Illawarra Dragons	24	17	0	7	2	548	329	+219	38
2	Canterbury-Bankstown Bulldogs	24	18	0	6	2	575	428	+147	38^{1}
3	Gold Coast Titans	24	16	0	8	2	514	467	+47	36
4	Melbourne Storm	24	14	1	9	2	505	348	+157	33
5	Manly-Warringah Sea Eagles	24	14	0	10	2	549	459	+90	32
6	Brisbane Broncos	24	14	0	10	2	511	566	−55	32
7	Newcastle Knights	24	13	0	11	2	508	491	+17	30
8	Parramatta Eels	24	12	1	11	2	476	473	+3	29
9	Wests Tigers	24	12	0	12	2	558	483	+75	28
10	South Sydney Rabbitohs	24	11	1	12	2	566	549	+17	27
11	Penrith Panthers	24	11	1	12	2	515	589	−74	27
12	North Queensland Cowboys	24	11	0	13	2	558	474	+84	26
13	Canberra Raiders	24	9	0	15	2	489	520	−31	22
14	New Zealand Warriors	24	7	2	15	2	377	565	−188	20
15	Cronulla-Sutherland Sharks	24	5	0	19	2	359	568	−209	14
16	Sydney Roosters	24	5	0	19	2	382	681	−299	14

^{1} The Bulldogs were deducted 2 competition points after an interchange breach in Round 2.

== Fixtures ==
=== Pre-season ===
Date	Round	Opponent	Venue	Score	Tries	Goals	Attendance
21 February	Trial 1	Warriors	North Harbour Stadium	28 – 32	-	-	-
28 February	Trial 2	Penrith Panthers	Barlow Park	18 – 18	-	-	-
Legend: Win Loss Draw

=== Regular season ===
Date	Round	Opponent	Venue	Score	Tries	Goals	Attendance
13 March	Round 1	Brisbane	Suncorp Stadium	18 – 19	Bowen, Tonga, Webb	Thurston (3/3)	45,022
21 March	Round 2	Wests Tigers	Dairy Farmers Stadium	42 – 14	Bowen, Burns, Kaufusi, Payne, Webb, J Williams, T Williams	Thurston (7/7)	19,879
28 March	Round 3	Melbourne	Dairy Farmers Stadium	12 – 26	Bolton, J Williams	Thurston (2/2)	21,489
6 April	Round 4	Canberra Raiders	Canberra Stadium	18 – 23	Burns, Farrar, J Williams	Thurston (3/3)	12,198
11 April	Round 5	Gold Coast Titans	Dairy Farmers Stadium	10 – 14	Hegarty, Thurston	Thurston (1/2)	18,123
19 April	Round 6	Cronulla Sharks	Hindmarsh Stadium	34 – 10	Bowen, Farrar, Hegarty, O'Donnell, Tonga, Tronc	Thurston (5/6)	8,547
25 April	Round 7	Manly Sea Eagles	Dairy Farmers Stadium	26 – 12	Bowen (2), Bolton, Farrar	Thurston (5/5)	16,153
1 May	Round 8	Parramatta Eels	Parramatta Stadium	18 – 28	Farrar, Southern, Tamou	Thurston (3/3)	8,104
9 May	Round 9	St George Illawarra	Dairy Farmers Stadium	24 – 20	Thurston (3), Tamou	Thurston (4/5(	16,031
17 May	Round 10	Warriors	Mt Smart Stadium	34 – 12	Bowen, Farrar, Graham, O'Donnell, Thurston, Tonga	Thurston (5/6)	16,345
25 May	Round 11	Newcastle Knights	Dairy Farmers Stadium	36 – 10	Burns, Kaufusi, O'Donnell, Southern, Thurston, J Williams	Thurston (6/7)	11,892
	Round 12	Bye					
6 June	Round 13	South Sydney Rabbitohs	Dairy Farmers Stadium	46 – 12	Graham (2), J Williams (2), Bolton, Bowen, Payne, Scott, T Williams	Thurston (5/9)	16,568
14 June	Round 14	St George Illawarra Dragons	WIN Stadium	18 – 32	O'Donnell, Tonga, T Williams	Thurston (3/3)	11,374
20 June	Round 15	Sydney Roosters	Dairy Farmers Stadium	24 – 22	Burns, Payne, Southern, Webb	J Williams (4/4)	13,486
26 June	Round 16	Canterbury Bulldogs	ANZ Stadium	18 – 30	Payne, Watts, J Williams	Thurston (3/3)	13,461
4 July	Round 17	Cronulla Sharks	Dairy Farmers Stadium	24 – 4	Bowen (2), J Williams, T Williams	Thurston (4/5)	17,283
	Round 18	Bye					
19 July	Round 19	Wests Tigers	Leichhardt Oval	14 – 34	Bowen, Webb	Thurston (3/3)	18,804
25 July	Round 20	Penrith Panthers	Dairy Farmers Stadium	20 – 28	Thurston, Tonga, Webb, J Williams	Thurston (2/4)	14,274
31 July	Round 21	Gold Coast Titans	Skilled Park	34 – 18	Bowen (2), Bani, Rapira, Tonga, J Williams	Thurston (5/6)	20,315
7 August	Round 22	Melbourne Storm	Olympic Park	8 – 20	Tonga (2)	Thurston (0/2)	10,510
14 August	Round 23	Canterbury Bulldogs	Dairy Farmers Stadium	12 – 22	Thurston, Tonga	Thurston (2/2)	18,199
22 August	Round 24	Newcastle Knights	EnergyAustralia Stadium	26 – 32	Thurston (2), Bani, Tonga, Watts	Thurston (3/5)	15,408
28 August	Round 25	Brisbane Broncos	Dairy Farmers Stadium	10 – 16	O'Donnell, Tonga	Thurston (1/2)	24,332
6 September	Round 26	Sydney Roosters	SFS	32 – 16	Graham, Malone, Thurston, Tonga, Tronc, T Williams	Thurston (4/6)	10,277
Legend: Win Loss Draw Bye

== Statistics ==
Name	App	T	G	FG	Pts
Clint Amos	4	-	-	-	-
Michael Bani	9	2	-	-	8
Scott Bolton	24	3	-	-	12
Matthew Bowen	20	12	-	-	48
Travis Burns	20	4	-	-	16
Ben Farrar	10	5	-	-	20
Ashley Graham	16	4	-	-	16
Ben Harris	8	-	-	-	-
Shannon Hegarty	5	2	-	-	8
Antonio Kaufusi	22	2	-	-	8
Donald Malone	2	1	-	-	4
Manase Manuokafoa	12	-	-	-	-
Luke O'Donnell	17	5	-	-	20
Aaron Payne	16	4	-	-	16
Steve Rapira	16	1	-	-	4
Grant Rovelli	13	-	-	-	-
Matthew Scott	23	1	-	-	4
Steve Southern	20	3	-	-	12
James Tamou	12	2	-	-	8
Ray Thompson	1	-	-	-	-
Johnathan Thurston	23	11	79	-	202
Willie Tonga	19	12	-	-	48
Shane Tronc	24	2	-	-	8
Anthony Watts	14	2	-	-	8
Carl Webb	22	5	-	-	20
Dayne Weston	2	-	-	-	-
John Williams	17	10	4	-	48
Ty Williams	17	5	-	-	20
Totals		98	83	0	558

== Representatives ==
The following players have played a representative match in 2009

	City vs Country	ANZAC Test	State of Origin 1	State of Origin 2	State of Origin 3	Prime Minister's XIII	Four Nations
Luke O'Donnell	City	-	New South Wales	New South Wales	-	Prime Minister's XIII	-
Matthew Scott	-	-	-	-	Queensland	Prime Minister's XIII	-
Johnathan Thurston	-	Australia	Queensland	Queensland	Queensland	Prime Minister's XIII	Australia
Willie Tonga	-	-	-	Queensland	Queensland	-	-

== Honours ==
=== League ===
- Dally M Halfback of the Year: Johnathan Thurston
- RLIF Halfback of the Year: Johnathan Thurston

=== Club ===
- Paul Bowman Medal: Luke O'Donnell
- Player's Player: Luke O'Donnell
- Club Person of the Year: Clint Amos
- Rookie of the Year: Steve Rapira
- Most Improved: Scott Bolton
- NYC Player of the Year: Dane Hogan

== Feeder Clubs ==
=== National Youth Competition ===
- North Queensland Cowboys - 9th, missed finals

=== Queensland Cup ===
- Mackay Cutters - 12th, Wooden Spoon
- Northern Pride - 2nd, Runners-up
