= 2010 North Queensland Cowboys season =

Coordinates: 19°18′58″S 146°42′43″E

- NRL Rank: 15th
- Play-off result: Missed finals
- 2010 record: Wins: 5; draws: 0; losses: 19
- Points scored: For: 425; against: 667

Team information
- CEO: Peter Parr
- Coach: Neil Henry
- Captain: Johnathan Thurston Matthew Scott
- Stadium: Dairy Farmers Stadium
- Avg. attendance: 14,256
- High attendance: 20,148 (vs. Brisbane Broncos, Round 22)

Top scorers
- Tries: Willie Tonga (12)
- Goals: Johnathan Thurston (43)
- Points: Johnathan Thurston (95)
← 2009	2011 →

The 2010 North Queensland Cowboys season was the 16th season in the club's history. Coached by Neil Henry and co-captained by Johnathan Thurston and Matthew Scott, they competed in the National Rugby League's 2010 Telstra Premiership, finishing in 15th place and failing to make the finals for the 3rd consecutive year.

== Season summary ==
Prior to the kick-off of the 2010 season, the media's attention surrounded the Cowboys' signing of ex-Australian international forward, Willie Mason on a one-year deal. The controversial figure was one of the team's most consistent players in 2010 but would leave the Cowboys at season's end to join English Super League side Hull Kingston Rovers.

2010 resulted in a very poor season for the Cowboys who recorded just five wins from 24 matches, although four of those wins came against teams that would participate in the 2010 finals series. Had the Melbourne Storm not been deducted premiership points for salary cap breaches earlier in the year, the Cowboys would have received the wooden spoon. During the season the side went on a three-game losing streak, two four-game losing streaks and ended the season on a run of six straight losses.

Highlights during the season included a golden point extra time victory over the Newcastle Knights in Round 20, in which rookie winger Will Tupou scored the match-winning try and the debuts of 18-year-old Michael Morgan and 17-year-old Jason Taumalolo, who would go on to play integral roles in the Cowboys' first Premiership win in 2015. Taumalolo was the youngest player to ever make his debut for the Cowboys.

The Cowboys' season of disappointment only got worse when Johnathan Thurston was arrested in Brisbane for drunk and disorderly behaviour during the off-season. His captaincy role at the Cowboys was under review, but no further action was taken. Furthermore, CEO Peter Parr was removed from his role and relegated to football operations manager.

During the off-season the club underwent a major overhaul of personnel, releasing 15 players and signing a number of new recruits for 2011, including Queensland and Australian representatives Dallas Johnson and Brent Tate.

=== Milestones ===
- Round 1: Willie Mason made his debut for the club.
- Round 4: Leeson Ah Mau and Shannon Gallant made their debuts for the club.
- Round 4: Will Tupou made his NRL debut.
- Round 6: Carl Webb played his 100th game for the club.
- Round 7: Isaak Ah Mau made his debut for the club.
- Round 9: Matthew Bowen scored his 100th try for the club.
- Round 9: Dane Hogan and Michael Morgan made their NRL debuts.
- Round 16: John Williams played his 50th game for the club.
- Round 16: Arana Taumata made his debut for the club.
- Round 18: Scott Bolton played his 50th game for the club.
- Round 24: Jason Taumalolo made his NRL debut.
- Round 25: Matthew Scott played his 100th game for the club.
- Round 25: Ty Williams played his 150th game for the club.
- Round 26: Matthew Bowen played his 200th game for the club.

== Squad List ==
North Queensland Cowboys NRL Squad 2010
First team squad			Coaching staff
Mitch Achurch – PR; Isaak Ah Mau – PR; Leeson Ah Mau – SR; Clint Amos – HK; Michael Bani – WG; Scott Bolton – SR; Matthew Bowen – FB; Shannon Gallant – FB; Obe Geia – WG; Ashley Graham – WG; Ben Harris – CE; Dane Hogan – LK	Antonio Kaufusi – PR; Donald Malone – CE; Manase Manuokafoa – PR; Willie Mason – SR; Michael Morgan – FE; Luke O'Donnell – LK; Aaron Payne – HK; Steve Rapira – SR; Grant Rovelli – HB; Matthew Scott (c) – PR; Nick Slyney – LK; Steve Southern – SR	James Tamou – PR; Jason Taumalolo – LK; Arana Taumata – FE; Ray Thompson – HB; Johnathan Thurston (c) – HB; Willie Tonga – CE; Will Tupou – WG; Anthony Watts – HK; Carl Webb – PR; John Williams – WG; Ty Williams – WG	Head coach: Neil Henry; Assistant coaches: Mick Crawley (assistant coach); Matt Parish (assistant coach); Billy Johnstone (strength & conditioning coach); Glen Murphy (athletic performance manager); Legend: (c) Captain(s); (vc) Vice-captain(s)

== Squad Movement ==
=== 2010 Gains ===
Player	Signed From	Until End of
Isaak Ah Mau	Easts Tigers	2011
Leeson Ah Mau	Warriors	2011
Shannon Gallant	Wests Tigers	2011
Willie Mason	Sydney Roosters	2010
Arana Taumata	Wests Tigers (mid-season)	2011
Will Tupou	Brisbane Broncos	2011

=== 2010 Losses ===
Player	Signed To	Until End of
Matthew Bartlett	Lakes United	2010
Brandon Boor	Released	-
Travis Burns	Penrith Panthers	2011
Shannon Hegarty	Retired	-
Antonio Kaufusi	Newcastle Knights (mid-season)	2012
Manase Manuokafoa	Parramatta Eels (mid-season)	2011
David Pangai	Western Suburbs Rosellas	2010
Anthony Perkins	Released	-
Shane Tronc	Brisbane Broncos	2011
Dayne Weston	Burleigh Bears	2010

== Ladder ==
2010 NRL season
Pos.	Team	Pld	W	D	L	B	PF	PA	PD	Pts
1	St. George Illawarra Dragons (P)	24	17	0	7	2	518	299	+219	38
2	Penrith Panthers	24	15	0	9	2	645	489	+156	34
3	Wests Tigers	24	15	0	9	2	537	503	+34	34
4	Gold Coast Titans	24	15	0	9	2	520	498	+22	34
5	New Zealand Warriors	24	14	0	10	2	539	486	+53	32
6	Sydney Roosters	24	14	0	10	2	559	510	+49	32
7	Canberra Raiders	24	13	0	11	2	499	493	+6	30
8	Manly Warringah Sea Eagles	24	12	0	12	2	545	510	+35	28
9	South Sydney Rabbitohs	24	11	0	13	2	584	567	+17	26
10	Brisbane Broncos	24	11	0	13	2	508	535	−27	26
11	Newcastle Knights	24	10	0	14	2	499	569	−70	24
12	Parramatta Eels	24	10	0	14	2	413	491	−78	24
13	Canterbury-Bankstown Bulldogs	24	9	0	15	2	494	539	−45	22
14	Cronulla-Sutherland Sharks	24	7	0	17	2	354	609	−255	18
15	North Queensland Cowboys	24	5	0	19	2	425	667	−242	14
16	Melbourne Storm	24	14	0	10	2	489	363	+126	0^{1}

^{1} Melbourne were deducted eight premiership points and barred from receiving premiership points for the rest of the season due to gross long-term salary cap breaches.

== Fixtures ==
=== Pre-season ===
Date	Round	Opponent	Venue	Score	Tries	Goals	Attendance
12 February	Trial 1	Wests Tigers	Tiger Park	4 – 28	Manuokafoa	J Williams (0/1)	5,000
20 February	Trial 2	Warriors	Barlow Park	6 – 28	Geia	J Williams (1/1)	8,000
27 February	Trial 3	Gold Coast Titans	Richardson Park	22 – 4	O'Donnell (2), Bani, J Williams	J Williams (2/3), Thurston (1/1)	9,879
Legend: Win Loss Draw

=== Regular season ===
Date	Round	Opponent	Venue	Score	Tries	Goals	Attendance
12 March	Round 1	Brisbane Broncos	Suncorp Stadium	24 – 30	Graham, Thurston, Tonga, T Williams	Thurston (4/4)	48,516
20 March	Round 2	Penrith Panthers	Dairy Farmers Stadium	28 – 20	Bolton (2), Bani, Tonga	Thurston (6/6)	13,335
26 March	Round 3	St George Illawarra Dragons	WIN Stadium	8 – 33	Graham	Thurston (2/2)	13,267
3 April	Round 4	Gold Coast Titans	Dairy Farmers Stadium	32 – 18	Tonga (3), O'Donnell, Thurston	Thurston (6/6)	15,551
10 April	Round 5	Wests Tigers	Dairy Farmers Stadium	16 – 23	Bolton, Tonga, Watts	Thurston (1/1), J Williams (1/3)	16,273
17 April	Round 6	Newcastle	EnergyAustralia Stadium	18 – 36	Gallant, Graham, J Williams	J Williams (3/3)	14,205
23 April	Round 7	Parramatta Eels	Dairy Farmers Stadium	18 – 24	Bolton, Graham, Tonga	Thurston (3/3)	11,335
1 May	Round 8	Melbourne Storm	Dairy Farmers Stadium	6 – 34	Bolton	Graham (1/1)	19,853
10 May	Round 9	Sydney Roosters	SFS	32 – 14	Bani (2), Bowen, Tonga, Watts, J Williams	J Williams (3/5), Graham (1/1)	6,478
15 May	Round 10	Warriors	Mt Smart Stadium	12 – 24	Bani, Bolton	Thurston (2/2)	10,800
	Round 11	Bye					
29 May	Round 12	Manly Sea Eagles	Dairy Farmers Stadium	20 – 24	Graham (2), O'Donnell, Tupou	Thurston (2/4)	13,538
7 June	Round 13	South Sydney Rabbitohs	ANZ Stadium	4 – 32	Graham	Thurston (0/1)	9,688
12 June	Round 14	Canberra Raiders	Dairy Farmers Stadium	16 – 8	Morgan (2)	J Williams (4/4)	12,058
19 June	Round 15	Melbourne Storm	AAMI Park	12 – 58	Gallant, Tamou	Thurston (2/2)	10,661
26 June	Round 16	Cronulla Sharks	Dairy Farmers Stadium	19 – 20	Mason, Scott, Webb	Thurston (3/4, 1 FG)	13,063
	Round 17	Bye					
12 July	Round 18	Parramatta Eels	Parramatta Stadium	24 – 36	Tonga (2), Taumata, Tupou	Thurston (4/4)	11,177
19 July	Round 19	Wests Tigers	Leichhardt Oval	16 – 26	Graham, Harris, Taumata	Thurston (2/3)	11,364
24 July	Round 20	Newcastle Knights	Dairy Farmers Stadium	28 – 24	O'Donnell (2), Tonga, Tupou, Watts	Thurston (4/5)	12,146
30 July	Round 21	Penrith Panthers	CUA Stadium	16 – 24	Graham, Tonga, Tupou	Thurston (2/3)	7,080
6 August	Round 22	Brisbane Broncos	Dairy Farmers Stadium	26 – 34	Ah Mau, Bolton, Hogan, T Williams	Graham (5/5)	20,148
14 August	Round 23	Gold Coast Titans	Skilled Park	18 – 37	T Williams (2), Watts	J Williams (3/3)	14,032
21 August	Round 24	Canterbury Bulldogs	Dairy Farmers Stadium	20 – 22	T Williams (2), Rovelli, J Williams	J Williams (2/4)	11,742
28 August	Round 25	Canberra Raiders	Canberra Stadium	4 – 48	Bani	J Williams (0/1)	11,434
4 September	Round 26	Sydney Roosters	Dairy Farmers Stadium	8 – 18	Bowen, T Williams	J Williams (0/2)	12,033
Legend: Win Loss Draw Bye

== Statistics ==
Name	App	T	G	FG	Pts
Isaak Ah Mau	4	-	-	-	-
Leeson Ah Mau	18	1	-	-	4
Clint Amos	5	-	-	-	-
Michael Bani	10	5	-	-	20
Scott Bolton	24	7	-	-	28
Matthew Bowen	16	2	-	-	8
Shannon Gallant	9	2	-	-	8
Ashley Graham	24	9	7	-	50
Ben Harris	9	1	-	-	4
Dane Hogan	10	1	-	-	4
Antonio Kaufusi	11	-	-	-	-
Manase Manuokafoa	4	-	-	-	-
Willie Mason	23	1	-	-	4
Michael Morgan	4	2	-	-	8
Luke O'Donnell	13	4	-	-	16
Aaron Payne	21	-	-	-	-
Steve Rapira	10	-	-	-	-
Grant Rovelli	13	1	-	-	4
Matthew Scott	23	1	-	-	4
Nick Slyney	3	-	-	-	-
Steve Southern	6	-	-	-	-
James Tamou	19	1	-	-	4
Jason Taumalolo	1	-	-	-	-
Arana Taumata	7	2	-	-	8
Ray Thompson	4	-	-	-	-
Johnathan Thurston	17	2	43	1	95
Willie Tonga	21	12	-	-	48
Will Tupou	12	4	-	-	16
Anthony Watts	21	4	-	-	16
Carl Webb	18	1	-	-	4
John Williams	17	3	16	-	4
Ty Williams	11	7	-	-	28
Totals		73	66	1	425

== Representatives ==
The following players have played a representative match in 2010

	All Stars match	City vs Country	State of Origin 1	State of Origin 2	State of Origin 3	Prime Minister's XIII	Four Nations
Matthew Bowen	-	-	-	-	-	Prime Minister's XIII	-
Willie Mason	-	Country	-	-	-	-	-
Luke O'Donnell	NRL All Stars	-	-	New South Wales	-	-	-
Matthew Scott	-	-	Queensland	Queensland	Queensland	-	Australia
Johnathan Thurston	Indigenous All Stars	-	Queensland	Queensland	Queensland	-	-
Willie Tonga	-	-	Queensland	Queensland	Queensland	Prime Minister's XIII	Australia
Anthony Watts	-	-	-	-	-	Prime Minister's XIII	-
Carl Webb	Indigenous All Stars	-	-	-	-	-	-
Ty Williams	Indigenous All Stars	-	-	-	-	-	-

== Honours ==
=== League ===
- NYC Team of the Year: James Segeyaro

=== Club ===
- Paul Bowman Medal: Matthew Scott
- Player's Player: Matthew Scott
- Club Person of the Year: Jeff Reibel
- Rookie of the Year: Leeson Ah Mau
- Most Improved: James Tamou
- NYC Player of the Year: Jason Taumalolo

== Feeder Clubs ==
=== National Youth Competition ===
- North Queensland Cowboys – 4th, lost semi final

=== Queensland Cup ===
- Mackay Cutters – 6th, lost preliminary final
- Northern Pride – 4th, Premiers
