= 2011 North Queensland Cowboys season =

Coordinates: 19°18′58″S 146°42′43″E

- NRL Rank: 7th
- Play-off result: Lost Qualifying Final (v Manly Sea Eagles, 8-42)
- 2011 record: Wins: 14; draws: 0; losses: 10
- Points scored: For: 532; against: 480

Team information
- CEO: Peter Jourdain
- Coach: Neil Henry
- Captain: Johnathan Thurston Matthew Scott
- Stadium: Dairy Farmers Stadium
- Avg. attendance: 14,189
- High attendance: 26,463 (vs. Brisbane Broncos, Round 23)

Top scorers
- Tries: Ashley Graham (12)
- Goals: Johnathan Thurston (61)
- Points: Johnathan Thurston (162)
← 2010	2012 →

The 2011 North Queensland Cowboys season was the 17th season in the club's history. They competed in the National Rugby League's 2011 Telstra Premiership. They finished the regular season in 7th place and were knocked out in the first week of the finals by the eventual premiers, the Manly-Warringah Sea Eagles.

== Season summary ==
After missing the finals the previous three seasons, finishing 15th in both 2008 and 2010, the Cowboys underwent a major overhaul of personnel for the 2011 season. Club legend Ty Williams retired and they parted ways with club favourites Luke O'Donnell, Carl Webb and Steve Southern. Their biggest signing for the 2011 season was Queensland and Australian representative centre Brent Tate. They also made key recruits in the signings of former Melbourne Storm and Queensland State of Origin representative Dallas Johnson, premiership winner Glenn Hall from the English Super League, re-signing a former Cowboy in Gavin Cooper and picking up younger, experienced first graders such as Antonio Winterstein.

The Cowboys' new signings had a positive impact on the NRL team, with the club spending the majority of the year in the top four before a late slide dropped them to seventh position and giving them their first finals appearance since 2007. In 2011, they were the most watched NRL club on pay television, and their Round 4 clash against the Parramatta Eels was the fourth most watched sports event in Fox Sport's history.

In the qualifying final, they led Manly 8–0 at half time before being overrun by the Sea Eagles who went on to claim the premiership.

=== Milestones ===
- Round 1: Glenn Hall, Ben Jones, Dallas Johnson and Ashton Sims made their debuts for the club.
- Round 2: Ashley Graham played his 100th game for the club.
- Round 2: Tariq Sims made his NRL debut.
- Round 3: Kalifa Faifai Loa made his debut for the club.
- Round 3: James Segeyaro made his NRL debut.
- Round 5: Antonio Winterstein made his debut for the club.
- Round 4: Matthew Bowen became the club's most capped player with 204 games.
- Round 9: Johnathan Thurston became the club's highest point scorer.
- Round 10: Willie Tonga played his 50th game for the club.
- Round 13: Johnathan Thurston scored his 50th try for the club.
- Round 14: Ashley Graham scored his 50th try for the club.
- Round 14: Joel Riethmuller made his NRL debut.
- Round 18: Cory Paterson made his debut for the club.
- Round 19: Brent Tate made his debut for the club.
- Round 23: James Tamou played his 50th game for the club.

== Squad List ==
North Queensland Cowboys NRL Squad 2011
First team squad			Coaching staff
Isaak Ah Mau – PR; Leeson Ah Mau – SR; Clint Amos – SR; Michael Bani – SR; Scott Bolton – SR; Matthew Bowen – FB; Gavin Cooper – SR; Jack Cooper – SR; Kalifa Faifai Loa – WG; Shannon Gallant – WG; Ashley Graham – WG; Glenn Hall – SR	Dane Hogan – LK; Dallas Johnson – LK; Ben Jones – FE; Blake Leary – SR; Tyson Martin – SR; Michael Morgan – FE; Cory Paterson – SR; Aaron Payne – HK; Joel Riethmuller – LK; Matthew Scott (c) – PR; James Segeyaro – HK; Ashton Sims – PR	Tariq Sims – SR; Dylan Smith – PR; James Tamou – PR; Brent Tate – CE; Jason Taumalolo – LK; Ray Thompson – FE; Ricky Thorby – PR; Johnathan Thurston (c) – HB; Willie Tonga – WG; Will Tupou – WG; Antonio Winterstein – WG	Head coach: Neil Henry; Assistant coaches: Mick Crawley (assistant coach); Peter Ryan (assistant coach); Paul Bowman (High Performance Manager); Glen Murphy (head conditioner); Sean Edwards (strength & conditioning coach); Legend: (c) Captain(s); (vc) Vice-captain(s)

== Squad Movement ==
=== 2011 Gains ===
Player	Signed From	Until End of
Gavin Cooper	Penrith Panthers	2012
Kalifa Faifai Loa	St George Illawarra Dragons	2012
Glenn Hall	Bradford Bulls	2012
Dallas Johnson	Catalans Dragons	2013
Ben Jones	Sydney Roosters	2012
Blake Leary	Melbourne Storm	2012
Tyson Martin	Mackay Cutters	2012
Cory Paterson	Newcastle Knights (mid-season)	2012
Joel Riethmuller	Northern Pride	2011
Ashton Sims	Brisbane Broncos	2012
Tariq Sims	Brisbane Broncos	2012
Brent Tate	Warriors	2013
Ricky Thorby	St George Illawarra Dragons	2012
Antonio Winterstein	Brisbane Broncos	2013

=== 2011 Losses ===
Player	Signed To	Until End of
Mitch Achurch	Western Suburbs Magpies	2011
Obe Geia	Released	-
Ben Harris	Retired	-
Donald Malone	Ipswich Jets	2011
Willie Mason	Hull Kingston Rovers	2013
Luke O'Donnell	Huddersfield Giants	2014
Steve Rapira	Warriors	2012
Grant Rovelli	Mackay Cutters	2011
Nick Slyney	Redcliffe Dolphins	2011
Steve Southern	Newcastle Knights	2011
Arana Taumata	Penrith Panthers	2011
Anthony Watts	Sydney Roosters	2013
Carl Webb	Parramatta Eels	2012
John Williams	Cronulla Sharks	2011
Ty Williams	Northern Pride	2011

== Ladder ==
2011 NRL Telstra Premiership
Pos.	Team	Pld	W	D	L	B	PF	PA	PD	Pts
1	Melbourne Storm	24	19	0	5	2	521	308	213	42
2	Manly Warringah Sea Eagles (P)	24	18	0	6	2	539	331	208	40
3	Brisbane Broncos	24	18	0	6	2	511	372	139	40
4	Wests Tigers	24	15	0	9	2	519	430	89	34
5	St. George Illawarra Dragons	24	14	1	9	2	483	341	142	33
6	New Zealand Warriors	24	14	0	10	2	504	393	111	32
7	North Queensland Cowboys	24	14	0	10	2	532	480	52	32
8	Newcastle Knights	24	12	0	12	2	478	443	35	28
9	Canterbury-Bankstown Bulldogs	24	12	0	12	2	449	489	-40	28
10	South Sydney Rabbitohs	24	11	0	13	2	531	562	-31	26
11	Sydney Roosters	24	10	0	14	2	417	500	-83	24
12	Penrith Panthers	24	9	0	15	2	430	517	-87	22
13	Cronulla-Sutherland Sharks	24	7	0	17	2	428	557	-129	18
14	Parramatta Eels	24	6	1	17	2	385	538	-153	17
15	Canberra Raiders	24	6	0	18	2	423	623	-200	16
16	Gold Coast Titans	24	6	0	18	2	363	629	-266	16

== Fixtures ==
=== Pre-season ===
Date	Round	Opponent	Venue	Score	Tries	Goals	Attendance
11 February	Trial 1	Wests Tigers	Jack Manski Oval	10 – 22	Martin, Riethmuller	Faifai Loa (1/2)	-
19 February	Trial 2	Brisbane Broncos	Traeger Park	4 – 26	Faifai Loa	Faifai Loa (0/1)	-
26 February	Trial 3	Gold Coast Titans	Barlow Park	22 – 24	Bowen, Bolton, Scott, Tonga	Thurston (3/4)	-
Legend: Win Loss Draw

=== Regular season ===
Date	Round	Opponent	Venue	Score	Tries	Goals	Attendance
11 March	Round 1	Brisbane Broncos	Suncorp Stadium	16 – 14	Bani, Tamou, Tupou	Thurston (2/3)	45,119
19 March	Round 2	Newcastle Knights	Dairy Farmers Stadium	22 – 34	Graham (2), Ah Mau, Jones	Thurston (3/4)	14,061
28 March	Round 3	Melbourne Storm	Dairy Farmers Stadium	34 – 6	Bowen (2), Graham (2), T Sims, Tupou	Thurston (5/6)	9,554
2 April	Round 4	Parramatta Eels	Parramatta Stadium	20 – 22	Faifai Loa (2), Graham, Tonga	Thurston (2/4)	12,226
8 April	Round 5	Gold Coast Titans	Dairy Farmers Stadium	22 – 12	Bowen, Cooper, Thurston, Tonga	Thurston (3/4)	13,651
16 April	Round 6	Canberra Raiders	Dairy Farmers Stadium	26 – 18	Bolton, Hall, Thurston, Winterstein	Thurston (5/5)	10,741
23 April	Round 7	Cronulla Sharks	Toyota Stadium	30 – 12	Cooper (2), Faifai Loa, Graham, Tonga	Thurston (5/6)	7,340
30 April	Round 8	Manly Sea Eagles	Dairy Farmers Stadium	22 – 20	Bowen (2), Payne, Thurston	Thurston (3/4)	14,884
8 May	Round 9	St George Illawarra Dragons	WIN Jubilee Oval	8 – 22	Thurston	Thurston (2/2)	13,056
14 May	Round 10	Parramatta Eels	Dairy Farmers Stadium	40 – 26	Thurston (2), Tonga (2), Faifai Loa, Hall, Winterstein	Thurston (6/7)	13,610
	Round 11	Bye					
28 May	Round 12	Sydney Roosters	Dairy Farmers Stadium	20 – 6	Hall, Tamou, Thurston	Thurston (4/4)	13,335
5 June	Round 13	Canberra Raiders	Canberra Stadium	40 – 24	Faifai Loa (2), T Sims (2), Hall, Payne, Thurston	Thurston (6/7)	11,128
11 June	Round 14	Manly Sea Eagles	Brookvale Oval	4 – 24	Graham	Cooper (0/1)	8,452
18 June	Round 15	Warriors	Dairy Farmers Stadium	30 – 10	Faifai Loa (2), Graham, Jones, Segeyaro, T Sims, Thurston	Cooper (1/3), Graham (0/1) Thurston (0/3)	16,081
26 June	Round 16	Penrith Panthers	Centrebet Stadium	20 – 30	Cooper (2), Jones, Segeyaro	Thurston (2/4)	14,090
	Round 17	Bye					
11 July	Round 18	Newcastle Knights	Ausgrid Stadium	22 – 12	Paterson, Riethmuller, Segeyaro, Tupou	Bowen (3/5)	17,212
16 July	Round 19	Wests Tigers	Dairy Farmers Stadium	18 – 38	Paterson (2), Tonga (2)	Bowen (1/4)	12,880
23 July	Round 20	Gold Coast Titans	Skilled Park	28 – 20	Graham (2), Cooper, Tate, Tonga	Bowen (4/5)	15,741
30 July	Round 21	Penrith Panthers	Dairy Farmers Stadium	30 – 18	Segeyaro (2), Graham, A Sims, Tate, Thompson	Bowen (2/4), Paterson (0/2)	12,349
5 August	Round 22	Canterbury Bulldogs	ANZ Stadium	6 – 14	Tate	Bowen (1/1)	8,654
12 August	Round 23	Brisbane Broncos	Dairy Farmers Stadium	16 – 34	Bowen, Faifai Loa, Tate	Thurston (2/3)	26,463
19 August	Round 24	South Sydney Rabbitohs	ANZ Stadium	24 – 26	Bowen, T Sims, Thurston, Tonga	Thurston (4/5)	11,208
27 August	Round 25	Cronulla Sharks	Dairy Farmers Stadium	28 – 20	Taumalolo (2), Bowen, Graham, Hall	Thurston (4/5)	12,655
3 September	Round 26	Warriors	Mt Smart Stadium	6 – 18	Faifai Loa	Thurston (1/1)	20,802
Legend: Win Loss Draw Bye

=== Finals ===
Date	Round	Opponent	Venue	Score	Tries	Goals	Attendance
3 September	Qualifying Final	Manly Sea Eagles	SFS	8 – 32	Tonga	Thurston (2/2)	13,972
Legend: Win Loss Draw Bye

== Statistics ==
Name	App	T	G	FG	Pts
Isaak Ah Mau	1	-	-	-	-
Leeson Ah Mau	15	1	-	-	4
Clint Amos	1	-	-	-	-
Michael Bani	2	1	-	-	4
Scott Bolton	15	1	-	-	4
Matthew Bowen	25	8	12	-	56
Gavin Cooper	24	6	1	-	26
Kalifa Faifai Loa	22	10	-	-	40
Ashley Graham	25	12	-	-	48
Glenn Hall	23	5	-	-	20
Dallas Johnson	24	-	-	-	-
Ben Jones	8	3	-	-	12
Michael Morgan	4	-	-	-	-
Cory Paterson	7	3	-	-	12
Aaron Payne	23	2	-	-	8
Joel Riethmuller	4	1	-	-	4
Matthew Scott	22	-	-	-	-
James Segeyaro	19	5	-	-	20
Ashton Sims	24	1	-	-	4
Tariq Sims	20	5	-	-	20
James Tamou	23	2	-	-	8
Brent Tate	9	4	-	-	16
Jason Taumalolo	3	2	-	-	8
Ray Thompson	25	1	-	-	4
Johnathan Thurston	19	10	61	-	162
Willie Tonga	20	10	-	-	40
Will Tupou	9	3	-	-	12
Antonio Winterstein	9	2	-	-	8
Totals		98	74	-	540

== Representatives ==
The following players have played a representative match in 2011

	All Stars match	ANZAC Test	State of Origin 1	State of Origin 2	State of Origin 3	Prime Minister's XIII	World Cup Qualifiers	Four Nations
Matthew Bowen	Indigenous All Stars	-	-	-	-	Prime Minister's XIII	-	-
Kalifa Faifai Loa	-	-	-	-	-	-	-	New Zealand
Joel Riethmuller	-	-	-	-	-	-	Italy	-
Matthew Scott	NRL All Star	Australia	Queensland	Queensland	Queensland	-	-	Australia
James Segeyaro	-	-	-	-	-	Papua New Guinea	-	-
Ray Thompson	-	-	-	-	-	Papua New Guinea	-	-
Johnathan Thurston	Indigenous All Stars	Australia	Queensland	Queensland	Queensland	-	-	Australia
Willie Tonga	Indigenous All Stars	-	Queensland	-	-	-	-	Australia

== Honours ==
=== League ===
- Golden Boot: Johnathan Thurston
- Dally M Prop of the Year: Matthew Scott
- RLIF Prop of the Year: Matthew Scott
- RLPA NYC Player of the Year: Jason Taumalolo
- NYC Team of the Year: Kyle Feldt, Jason Taumalolo

=== Club ===
- Paul Bowman Medal: Ashley Graham
- Player's Player: Johnathan Thurston
- Club Person of the Year: Gavin Cooper
- Rookie of the Year: Tariq Sims
- Most Improved: Ray Thompson
- NYC Player of the Year: Jason Taumalolo

== Feeder Clubs ==
=== National Youth Competition ===
- North Queensland Cowboys - 2nd, Runners-up

=== Queensland Cup ===
- Mackay Cutters - 11th, missed finals
- Northern Pride - 2nd, Lost Semi Final
