= 2010 State of Origin series =

Australian rugby league series

- Won by: Queensland (15th title)
- Series margin: 3–0
- Points scored: 133
- Attendance: 182,464 (ave. 60,821 per match)
- Top points scorer(s): Johnathan Thurston (24)
- Top try scorer(s): Darius Boyd (3)

The 2010 State of Origin series was the 29th annual best-of-three series of interstate rugby league football matches between the Queensland and New South Wales representative teams played entirely under 'state of origin' selection rules. For the second year in a row, a Queensland victory set a new record for consecutive State of Origin titles, reaching five. Queensland won all three matches, completing their first series white-wash since 1995.

In a world first, the Nine Network broadcast free-to-air for the first match in 3D to the Sydney, Newcastle, Wollongong, Brisbane, Perth, Adelaide and Melbourne areas. Part-way through the series it became steeped in controversy, firstly for Israel Folau's announcement of his defection to the AFL and subsequent non-selection by Queensland, and secondly by New South Wales' Andrew Johns–Timana Tahu racial slur controversy. Queensland fullback Billy Slater was awarded the Wally Lewis Medal as Player of the Series.

== Game I ==
In addition to Matt Ballin, who was included as Queensland's hooker due to Cameron Smith's failure to recover from an elbow injury suffered in the 2010 ANZAC Test, Dave Taylor and Cooper Cronk were selected to make their debuts for the Maroons.

Jamal Idris and Brett Morris were New South Wales' only rookies.

Wednesday, 26 May 2010
20:00

New South Wales	24 – 28	Queensland
Tries; Hayne (7') 1 Watmough (56') 1 Idris (73') 1 Creagh (80') 1 Goals; Lyon 4/5	(Report) (Game stats)	Tries; 1 (15') Boyd; 1 (34') Slater; 1 (47') Lockyer; 1 (62') Inglis; 1 (67') Thaiday; Goals; 4/5 Thurston

ANZ Stadium, Sydney
Attendance: 68,753
Referee: Tony Archer, Shayne Hayne
Player of the Match: Johnathan Thurston

Prior to kick-off Australia's national anthem was performed by Sam Moran on a rainy night at ANZ Stadium. There were plenty of handling errors in the wet conditions and New South Wales were dominating field position early in the match. In the seventh minute their lock forward Anthony Watmough put a bomb up near Queensland's try-line which the Maroons' defence failed to secure. Jarryd Hayne was there to dive on it and the Blues had their first try. Jamie Lyon kicked the extras, so the score was 6–0. After more dropped ball Queensland then had an opportunity in good field position. In the fifteenth minute their halfback Johnathan Thurston took on the New South Wales defensive line before throwing a one-handed pass over the top of the defence to Darius Boyd to score untouched out on the wing. Thurston's conversion was successful, so it was 6–6. The score remained level until the twenty-eighth minute when the Blues were awarded a dubious penalty for a Maroons offside infringement and Lyon kicked it successfully, giving his side an 8–6 lead. About five minutes later, Queensland had made it to within fifteen metres of New South Wales' line when Thurston chipped the ball ahead for his fullback Billy Slater to pick up and dive over the line with. The Maroons halfback kicked the extras, so the score was 8–12 and remained unchanged for the remaining five minutes of the first half.

Queensland scored first in the second half when, attacking close to the Blues' line, prop David Shillington was able to stand in a tackle and offload to Maroons captain Darren Lockyer, who raced through to get a try. Thurston missed the conversion, so the score remained 8–16 in favour of Queensland. Just before the fifty-minute mark, Lyon chipped the ball over the Maroons' defence for Hayne to race ahead and regather in the open space of Queensland's half. However Hayne instantly threw a speculative no-look pass to his winger which was high and went over the sideline untouched. When the Maroons 123 kg utility forward Dave Taylor took the field in the fifty-fifth minute, he became the heaviest player in State of Origin history. New South Wales then had an attacking opportunity close to Queensland's line and Lyon put a kick up towards the goal-posts which none of the leapers could catch, and Watmough was there to grab it and take it over the line to score. Lyon converted, so the Blues were back within two points at 14–16 with twenty-three minutes of the match remaining. In the sixty-first minute after being tackled on the halfway line, the Maroons worked the ball out to Boyd's wing, where he raced down the sideline before throwing it back in to Greg Inglis to score out wide. Thurston's kick was successful, so Queensland were in front 14–22. In the sixty-seventh minute as New South Wales fullback Kurt Gidley was returning a kick to the ten-metre mark, Thurston, who led the Maroons' chasers, took the ball from his arms one-on-one and gave it to Sam Thaiday, who scored by the posts. The try was awarded and Thurston converted, so the score was 14–28. The Blues scored next when deep inside Queensland's territory they worked the ball out to the right wing where Jamal Idris, making his Origin debut, forced his way over the line. The video referee was called upon to award the try and Lyon's conversion attempt hit one of the uprights, so the score was 18–28 with just over six minutes of play remaining. In the final minute New South Wales got a further consolation try when Gidley chipped the ball ahead and Slater couldn't secure it, giving Ben Creagh the opportunity to dive on it over the line. Lyon kicked the extras, but time ran out before play was restarted, so Queensland won 24–28.

The Nine Network's broadcast of Game I broke the television ratings record for a State of Origin match and became Australia's highest-rating television programme of 2010 thus far.

== Game II ==
Tickets for Game II sold out within two hours of going on sale. Both sides' preparations for the match were steeped in controversy. Maroons winger Israel Folau's announcement shortly after Game I that he would be playing Australian rules football for the AFL's expansion club in Greater Western Sydney led to agreement from the Queensland Rugby League administration as well as senior players that he should not be selected to play in Game II. Brent Tate looked to be his likely replacement until he broke his jaw, and Queensland quickly changed their mind and named Folau in the squad. This led to outcry from the New South Wales Rugby League, who criticised the QRL for giving the AFL free publicity. The Blues camp was disrupted by Indigenous centre Timana Tahu walking out of the team after racist comments from assistant coach and former teammate Andrew Johns directed at Queensland Aboriginal player Greg Inglis. Johns also stepped down from his role with the team as a result.

David Shillington was chosen to be starting prop for Queensland as Petero Civoniceva was ruled out after suffering from a fractured hand in Game I, freeing his place on the interchange bench for Ben Hannant to make his return to Origin. Vice-captain Cameron Smith also returned from injury, reclaiming the hooker role from stand-in Matt Ballin.

An initial squad of 21 chosen was announced for game two for New South Wales due to the complication of judiciary hearings for two players selected in the squad. The 17-man squad was then chosen the day afterwards. Seven new players were selected, with Beau Scott (making his State of Origin debut), Joel Monaghan, Trent Barrett, Mitchell Pearce, Nathan Hindmarsh, Paul Gallen and Luke O'Donnell selected in the starting 17. Manly representatives Jamie Lyon and Anthony Watmough were not selected as both had obtained injury concerns, whilst Luke Lewis received a one-match suspension that ruled him out of final squad selection.

Monaghan was called in five days into team preparation to replace right wing Timana Tahu, who extraordinarily quit the squad after taking offence to racial comments made by Blues' assistant coach and former teammate Andrew Johns. Johns believed to have referred to Queensland centre Greg Inglis, who along with Tahu having Aboriginal origins, during his comments and afterwards decided to resign from his duty following the scandal.

Wednesday, 16 June 2010
20:00

Queensland	34 – 6	New South Wales
Tries; Folau (12', 48') 2 Inglis (4') 1 Boyd (35') 1 Tonga (44') 1 Cronk (60') 1 Goals; Thurston 5/6 (13', 36', 44', 49', 62')	(Report) (Game stats)	Tries; 1 (79') White; Goals; 1/1 Ennis (79')

Suncorp Stadium, Brisbane
Attendance: 52,452
Referee: Tony Archer, Shayne Hayne
Player of the Match: Darren Lockyer

Pre-match entertainment was provided by Jimmy Barnes, who performed two songs before 12-year-old Straalen McCallum sang the national anthem.

It took Queensland till the third minute to score, when, after a penalty helped them down to New South Wales' end of the field, the ball was thrown out to centre Greg Inglis, who scored in the corner. Johnathan Thurston missed the difficult conversion attempt, so the score was 4–0. About six minutes later the Maroons scored again, this time on the other wing when the ball was passed out to right winger Israel Folau to cross in the corner. Thurston's kick was successful, so the score was 10–0 after twelve minutes. Blues forward Paul Gallen was placed on report for a high shot on Nate Myles in the twenty-third minute. In the twenty-sixth minute, a dangerous tackle in which New South Wales forward Luke O'Donnell lifted Queensland winger Darius Boyd resulted in a brawl (in which O'Donnell also head-butted Maroons' forward Dave Taylor) and a penalty to the Queenslanders. About four minutes later the Maroons were attacking close to the Blues' line and crossed again when their captain Darren Lockyer put his fullback Billy Slater through a hole in the defence twelve metres out. However the pass was controversially called forward and the try disallowed. Next came a bit of individual brilliance from Johnathan Thurston when he received the ball on the fifth tackle just inside his own half and chip-kicked it over the head of a defender, running through to regather it after a failed attempt to do so by Kurt Gidley. After the ensuing play-the-ball, it was passed out to Boyd on the left wing, who ran twenty metres to score untouched. The conversion by Thurston was successful, so Queensland led 16–0 with four minutes of the first half remaining, which were played out with no further points.

Again in only the third minute of the half the Maroons had made it into New South Wales' half of the field where Lockyer put a high cross-field kick over to the posts for Slater, who wasn't able to catch it, but was able to tap it back, and Willie Tonga was there to ground the ball. The video referee awarded the try and Thurston kicked the extras, so the score was 22–0 after four minutes. The points kept coming for Queensland when a cut-out pass from Lockyer to Folau found the Blues outnumbered on the right wing. Thurston's sideline conversion was successful, so the score was 28–0 after less than ten minutes of the second half. In the fifty-eighth minute Inglis and opposing centre Beau Scott had a punch-up which ended with a penalty to the Maroons. A few minutes later Queensland got another close-range try when utility Cooper Cronk dummied and forced his way over the line. The extras were kicked by Thurston, so it was 34–0 after sixty-five minutes. New South Wales appeared to have scored their first try in the seventy-fourth minute, when Brett Morris dived onto his own chip-kick from close range. However it was disallowed by the video referee because a Blues defender, who was inadvertently offside had impeded the Maroons' defence. In the second last minute though, New South Wales got their sole consolation try when front-rower Brett White was put through a gap ten metres out from the Queensland line. This try saved the Blues from what would have been their biggest loss in the history of State of Origin, but the kick from Michael Ennis was successful, so the score was 34–6 and remained at that when the full-time siren sounded.

The win meant Queensland extended their record-breaking four consecutive series victories to five and in the process sentenced New South Wales to their fifth consecutive series defeat.

== Game III ==
Six new Blues players were selected for Game III: Greg Bird, Michael Gordon, Michael Jennings, Jason King, Tim Mannah and Kade Snowden. Gordon, King, Mannah, and Snowden all made their debuts for their state whilst Luke Lewis and Anthony Watmough returned after their absence from game two. Injury forced Matt Cooper out from being selected whilst Luke O'Donnell was not considered due to his suspension sentence obtained from Game II.

Queensland saw Petero Civoniceva selected after returning from his hand injury, forcing David Shillington back to the bench, and Ben Hannant out of the side.

Wednesday, 7 July 2010
20:00

New South Wales	18 – 23	Queensland
Tries; Gallen (35') 1 Gidley (47') 1 Bird (69') 1 Goals; Gordon 3/3 (37', 48', 70')	(Report); Game stats	Tries; 1 (20') Boyd; 1 (28') Myles; 1 (75') Slater; 1 (79') Tonga; Goals; 3/3 Thurston (22', 29', 75'); 0/1 Folau; Field Goals; 1 (40') Lockyer

ANZ Stadium, Sydney
Attendance: 61,259
Referee: Tony Archer, Shane Hayne
Player of the Match: Billy Slater

The National Anthem was first performed in Australian Aboriginal language before being performed in English.

New South Wales mistakes (including a dropped ball on their second hit-up, a failed attempt to find touch after a penalty and a mid-air tackle on Billy Slater marking a kick) meant they had almost no possession in the opposition half for the first quarter of the match. The weight of possession in attacking field position afforded Queensland the first try, which came in the twentieth minute as they worked the ball out to the left wing from close range for Darius Boyd to dive over. Johnathan Thurston's conversion from the sideline was successful, so the Maroons were leading 6 nil. Seven minutes later Queensland were again raiding the Blues' line when a select pass from Cameron Smith sent Nate Myles through a gap for his first Origin try. The kick from Thurston added the extra two points, so the Maroons had a 12–0 lead with eleven minutes of the half remaining. New South Wales, getting some ball in attacking position later in the half, scored their first try when Paul Gallen crashed over from close-range under the posts in the thirty-seventh minute. Debutant Michael Gordon made no mistake with the simple conversion, so the Blues were back in it at 12–6. In the final minute of the half Darren Lockyer kicked a field goal from 46 metres out, making the half-time score 13–6 in favour of the Queenslanders.

New South Wales got the first points of the second half while raiding the Maroons' line and keeping the ball alive with Kurt Gidley crashing through Queensland's scrambling goal-line defence. Gordon's conversion was successful, so the visitors' lead was reduced to one point at 13–12 after forty-eight minutes. Sixteen minutes later the Blues were again attacking the Maroons' line when Anthony Watmough broke into the clear and looked certain to score but Queensland fullback Billy Slater came up with a remarkable try-saving tackle that kept Watmough from grounding the ball. The pressure remained on the Maroons as the New South Welshmen continued their attack and in the sixty-ninth minute Blues dummy half Michael Ennis, two metres from the Queensland uprights, put a deft grubber kick through the defence and Greg Bird raced through to dive on it. This gave New South Wales the lead for the first time since the first half of Game I. Gordon's conversion put the Blues in front by five points at 13–18 with just over ten minutes of the match to go. A couple of minutes later after making a tackle, Ennis punched Nate Myles in the ruck, sparking a brawl and giving the Maroons a penalty in an attacking position. The Queenslanders decided to attack New South Wales' line and before the third tackle of the set Slater had scored after running onto Darren Lockyer's inside pass eight metres out. Thurston's conversion restored the Maroons' one-point lead at 19–18 with four and a half minutes of the match left. As the Blues tried to work the ball out of their own half Queensland winger Israel Folau intercepted a pass, giving his team possession again in good field position. One tackle later the ball was passed out to Willie Tonga, who had the defence outnumbered on the right side and cantered over untouched for the match-sealing try. Folau was given the difficult conversion attempt for Tonga's try and despite striking it well, the ball just missed. So the Maroons had achieved their first State of Origin series whitewash since 1995, winning the match 23-18 and providing the perfect birthday present for Mal Meninga, who turned 50 the following day.

Following the game the man-of-the-match award and Wally Lewis Medal for player of the series, were both given to Billy Slater before the State of Origin Shield was presented to skipper Darren Lockyer.

== Teams ==
The 18th man is a reserve to cover for any prospective injuries and, unless chosen, does not actually play.

=== New South Wales ===
Position	Game 1	Game 2	Game 3
Fullback	Kurt Gidley (c)	Jarryd Hayne	
Wing	Jarryd Hayne	Joel Monaghan^{1}	Michael Gordon
Centre	Matt Cooper		Michael Jennings
Centre	Timana Tahu	Beau Scott	
Wing	Brett Morris		
Five-Eighth	Jamie Lyon	Trent Barrett	Trent Barrett (c) ^{3}
Halfback	Brett Kimmorley	Mitchell Pearce	
Prop	Michael Weyman		Jason King
Hooker	Michael Ennis		
Prop	Josh Perry	Brett White	Kade Snowden
2nd Row	Trent Waterhouse	Nathan Hindmarsh^{2}	Luke Lewis
2nd Row	Ben Creagh		Paul Gallen
Lock	Anthony Watmough	Paul Gallen	Greg Bird
Interchange	Jamal Idris	Kurt Gidley (c)	Kurt Gidley ^{3}
Interchange	Tom Learoyd-Lahrs		
Interchange	Luke Lewis	Trent Waterhouse	Tim Mannah
Interchange	Brett White	Luke O'Donnell	Anthony Watmough
18th man	Brett Finch	Jason King	Chris Lawrence
Coach	Craig Bellamy		

^{1} – Timana Tahu was originally selected to play but withdrew due to racist comments by Andrew Johns. He was replaced by Joel Monaghan.

^{2} – Hindmarsh switched places with Waterhouse to play in the starting side after being initially selected for the bench.

^{3} – Barrett attained captaincy from Gidley in game three.

=== Queensland ===
Position	Game 1	Game 2	Game 3
Fullback	Billy Slater		
Wing	Darius Boyd		
Centre	Greg Inglis		
Centre	Willie Tonga		
Wing	Israel Folau		
Five-Eighth	Darren Lockyer (c)		
Halfback	Johnathan Thurston		
Prop	Matthew Scott		
Hooker	Matt Ballin^{1}	Cameron Smith	
Prop	Petero Civoniceva	David Shillington	Petero Civoniceva
2nd Row	Nate Myles		
2nd Row	Sam Thaiday		
Lock	Ashley Harrison		
Interchange	Cooper Cronk		
Interchange	David Shillington	Ben Hannant	David Shillington
Interchange	Neville Costigan		
Interchange	Dave Taylor		
18th man	Ben Te'o	Jharal Yow Yeh	Ben Lowe
Coach	Mal Meninga		

^{1} – Cameron Smith was originally selected to play but withdrew due to injury. He was replaced by Matt Ballin.

== Aftermath ==
Following the Blues' fifth (of what would eventually be eight) consecutive series loss, their main sponsor Aussie Home Loans withdrew their support for the team, after just one series. As well as this, a full-scale, on-and-off field investigation was launched into the attitude, behaviour, conduct and operation of the New South Wales team. Ironically, this investigation was carried out by a Queenslander, former Sydney Roosters CEO Brian Canavan.

Despite his best efforts, New South Wales has continued to underachieve in the State of Origin arena; since the investigation into the state's 2010 series defeat, the Blues have lost ten of sixteen State of Origin series, and fifteen out of twenty-one overall since the start of 2006, including losing the deciding game of the 2015 series by a record margin of 52–6.

== See also ==
- 2010 NRL season
