= Ashley Graham (rugby league) =

Australian rugby league footballer

Personal information
- Born: 4 June 1984 (age 42) Cairns, Queensland, Australia

Playing information
- Height: 186 cm (6 ft 1 in)
- Weight: 91 kg (14 st 5 lb)
- Position: Wing, Centre, Fullback
Club
Years	Team	Pld	T	G	FG	P
2002–06	Parramatta Eels	41	18	0	0	72
2006–13	North Qld Cowboys	161	84	25	0	386
	Total	202	102	25	0	458

Ashley Graham (born 4 June 1984) is an Australian former professional rugby league footballer who played in the 2000s and 2010s. Primarily a winger, he played for the Parramatta Eels and North Queensland Cowboys in the National Rugby League (NRL).

== Background ==
Born in Cairns, Queensland, Graham played his junior rugby league for the Cairns Kangaroos before being signed by the Parramatta Eels. In 2001, he represented the Queensland under-17 side in their 16–30 loss to New South Wales.

== Playing career ==
=== Parramatta Eels ===
In Round 19 of the 2002 NRL season, Graham made his NRL debut as an 18-year-old in Parramatta's 10–26 loss to the New Zealand Warriors. In May 2002, due to residency eligibility rules, represented New South Wales under-19, scoring two tries in a win over Queensland. At the end of the 2002 season, he was named Parramatta's Rookie of the Year and selected for the Junior Kangaroos, but later withdrew from the side.

In 2003, Graham became a regular for the Eels, scoring nine tries in 16 games. In a Round 25 win over the Brisbane Broncos, he broke his leg, ruling him out for nine months. He returned to first grade in 2004, playing 14 games, mainly on the wing. In 2005, Graham spent the majority of the season in Premier League, scoring a try in Parramatta's Grand Final win over the Sydney Roosters. In 2006, after just two NRL games, Graham was granted a release by the Eels.

=== North Queensland Cowboys ===
After his release from Parramatta, Graham returned to Queensland, signing with the North Queensland Cowboys. In Round 7 of the 2006 NRL season, he made his debut for the club in a 22–24 loss to the Cronulla-Sutherland Sharks.

In 2007, Graham scored 18 tries in 22 games for North Queensland, earning the club's Most Improved award at the end of the season. During the season, he was named as 18th man for Queensland in Game II of the 2007 State of Origin series. In 2008, Graham scored 10 tries for the Cowboys, finishing as the club's equal-top try scorer alongside John Williams. In October 2008, he re-signed with North Queensland until the end of 2012.

In January 2009, Graham was a member of Queensland's Emerging Origin squad for the first time since 2002.

In 2011, Graham played all 25 games for the Cowboys and finished as the club's top try scorer for the second time, winning the Paul Bowman Medal for Cowboys Player of the Year. In August 2011, journalist Leila McKinnon named Graham as the most underrated player in the NRL, noting the disproportion between his competition-leading 2702 metres gained, and his then 34-word Wikipedia article.

In 2012, Graham scored 21 tries and finished the regular season as the NRL's equal-leading try scorer with Canterbury's Ben Barba. In June 2012, he re-signed with the Cowboys on a one-year deal.

In April 2013, Graham announced that he would retire at the end of the season. In Round 16 of the 2013 NRL season, Graham played his 200th NRL games in the Cowboys' 24–4 win over the Cronulla-Sutherland Sharks. Two games later, in a 14–34 loss to the Manly-Warringah Sea Eagles, Graham injured his wrist, requiring reconstructive surgery, ending his career.

== Achievements and accolades ==
=== Individual ===
- NRL leading try scorer: 2012
- Paul Bowman Medal: 2011
- NRL Academic Team of the Year: 2011, 2012
- North Queensland Cowboys Most Improved: 2007
- Parramatta Eels Rookie of the Year: 2002

== Statistics ==
=== NRL ===
Season	Team	Matches	T	G	GK %	F/G	Pts
2002	Parramatta	5	2	0	—	0	8
2003	Parramatta	16	9	0	—	0	36
2004	Parramatta	14	4	0	—	0	16
2005	Parramatta	4	3	0	—	0	12
2006	Parramatta	2	0	0	—	0	0
2006	North Queensland	14	3	6	66.7	0	24
2007	North Queensland	22	18	12	66.7	0	96
2008	North Queensland	22	10	0	0.0	0	40
2009	North Queensland	16	4	0	—	0	16
2010	North Queensland	24	9	7	100.0	0	50
2011	North Queensland	25	12	0	0.0	0	48
2012	North Queensland	24	21	0	—	0	84
2013	North Queensland	14	7	0	—	0	28
Career totals		202	102	25	69.44%	0	458

== Post-playing career ==
In 2014, Graham, who graduated from James Cook University with a Bachelor of Sports and Exercise Science, became the strength & conditioning coach for the North Queensland Cowboys under-20s side. Since 2015, he has worked as a strength & conditioning coach for the Cowboys' NRL side and is the club's elite pathways performance coach.
