= Matthew Scott (rugby league) =

Australia international rugby league footballer

Matt Scott
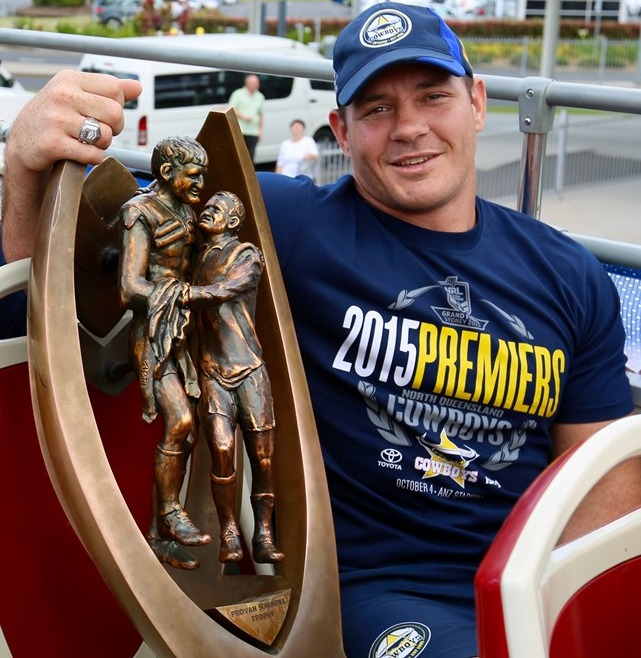

Personal information
- Full name: Matthew Scott
- Born: 30 July 1985 (age 41) Longreach, Queensland, Australia

Playing information
- Height: 185 cm (6 ft 1 in)
- Weight: 110 kg (17 st 5 lb)
- Position: Prop
Club
Years	Team	Pld	T	G	FG	P
2004–19	North Qld Cowboys	268	19	0	0	76
Representative
Years	Team	Pld	T	G	FG	P
2006–16	Queensland	22	1	0	0	4
2009	Prime Minister's XIII	1	1	0	0	4
2010–16	Australia	22	2	0	0	8
2011	NRL All Stars	1	0	0	0	0

Matthew Scott (born 30 July 1985), also known by the nickname of "Thumper", is an Australian former professional rugby league footballer who played as a prop for the North Queensland Cowboys in the NRL and Australia at international level.

Scott played his entire 16-year National Rugby League career with the Cowboys, co-captaining them to the 2015 NRL Grand Final and 2016 World Club Challenge. An eight-time State of Origin series winner with Queensland and World Cup winner with the Kangaroos, Scott was widely regarded as the best front-row forward of his generation in the Southern Hemisphere.

== Background ==
Scott was born in Longreach, Queensland and grew up in the small, nearby town of Ilfracombe. He played junior football for the Longreach Tigers and later the Gemfield Giants. He moved to St. Brendan's College, Yeppoon as a boarder after being spotted by one of the school's coaches at an outback carnival. He was signed by the North Queensland Cowboys during his schoolboy days.

== Playing career ==
=== 2004 ===
In Round 19 of the 2004 NRL season, Scott made his NRL debut for the Cowboys, at the age of 18, against the Parramatta Eels. Scott broke his leg in the opening minutes of the match, ruling him out for the rest of the season.

=== 2005 ===
Scott played just 3 NRL games in 2005, spending the majority of the season playing for the Cowboys' Queensland Cup side, the North Queensland Young Guns. He was a member of the Young Guns premiership-winning side that season, playing alongside future Cowboys teammates Scott Bolton and Gavin Cooper. Scott was 18th man for the Cowboys Grand Final against the Wests Tigers.

=== 2006 ===
In 2006, Scott played his first full season of first grade, playing 22 games and scoring 2 tries. He made his representative debut for Queensland in the 2006 State of Origin series, after just 14 NRL games. However, he was dropped from the team after the 17–16 loss to New South Wales and would not play in another Origin fixture until 2009. Speaking in 2009, Scott said that at the time, he thought his removal from the team was "harsh", but that he "obviously didn't step up and deliver".

=== 2007 ===
In 2007, Scott played his second full season of first grade and was an integral member of the Cowboys side that reached their third ever finals series, playing 23 games and starting the majority of them in the front row.

=== 2008 ===
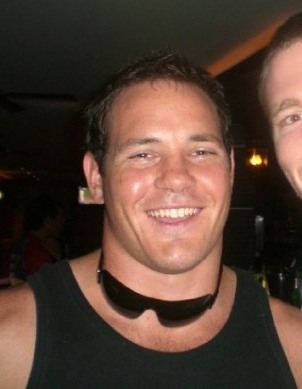
Scott in 2008

Scott's 2008 season was affected by injuries. He played the first 3 games of the season before succumbing to injuries. He would return to play the final 3 games of the year.

=== 2009 ===
Scott returned from an injury plagued 2008 with a strong 2009 season, which saw him return to the Queensland team and represent the Prime Minister's XIII in their end of season match against Papua New Guinea. In August, he signed a new four-year contract with the Cowboys.

=== 2010 ===
Scott was named the Cowboys' player of the year and players player for the 2010 season, though it was a poor season for the team, finishing 15th on the NRL ladder in front of only the Melbourne Storm, who had been stripped of their premiership points due to salary cap breaches. S

He was Queensland's starting prop for all three matches of the 2010 State of Origin series and made his debut for the Australia national team in the Four Nations series. He was selected as Australia's starting prop for the series final against New Zealand, edging veteran Petero Civoniceva out of the side.

=== 2011 ===
In 2011, Scott was appointed as the co-captain of the Cowboys, sharing the position with Johnathan Thurston, who had previously held it alone. He was also named the NRL's prop of the year in the Dally M Awards after missing out in 2010. His performance in Game 1 of the 2011 State of Origin series won him plaudits, with Brisbane newspaper The Courier Mail calling his "impact and workrate... enormous", and ABC Sport praising his "powerhouse display up front". He and fellow Queensland prop Petero Civoniceva ran the ball for a total of 301 metres during the match; their New South Wales counterparts only managed 71. Queensland won the match and went on to win the Origin series. The Cowboys returned to the NRL finals series, finishing in seventh place, and Scott was selected in the Australian squad to tour England for the Four Nations series. He scored the first try of the tournament, in Australia's 26–12 win over New Zealand; it was his first try as an international. During the tournament, the annual RLIF Awards dinner was held at the Tower of London and he was named prop forward of the year.

=== 2012 ===
During the 2012 State of Origin series, Scott's mother died, interrupting his preparation. However he played in all three games, helping extend Queensland's record winning streak to 7 consecutive series. At the end-of-season Test match against New Zealand, in which Australia retained the Bill Kelly Memorial Trophy, Scott was named man-of-the-match.

=== 2013 ===
Scott was selected for Australia in the 2013 Anzac Test, starting at prop. He played all three games of the 2013 State of Origin series in which Queensland extended their record for consecutive series victories to eight.

=== 2014 ===
In Round 9 of the 2014 NRL season, Scott ran for 220 metres in the Cowboys 27-14 win over the Broncos, earning him a rare perfect 10 score from Rugby League Week magazine. Despite missing his first State of Origin game for Queensland in five years through injury, Scott had a career best season in 2014. He averaged 56 minutes, 16.4 runs and 160 metres per game, all career bests, while also finishing the year with a career best 5 line breaks and 48 tackle busts.

Scott required a shoulder reconstruction at the end of 2014, ruling him out of the Four Nations tournament.

=== 2015 ===
In 2015, Scott regained his spot in the Australia side for the annual Anzac Test and started at prop in all 3 games of Queensland's State of Origin series win. He scored his first Origin try in the Maroons' Game 2 loss.

In Round 12 of the 2015 NRL season, Scott scored two tries in a game for the first time in his NRL career, in the Cowboys 18-14 win over the Manly Sea Eagles.

Scott was man of the match in the Cowboys 39-0 victory over the Cronulla-Sutherland Sharks in Week Two of the 2015 Finals Series. The Cowboys went on to defeat the Melbourne Storm the week after to book their place in the Grand Final. On 4 October 2015, Scott co-captained the Cowboys' Grand Final winning side, in the side's 17-16 victory over the Brisbane Broncos.

At the Dally M Awards, Scott was named Dally M Captain of the year alongside teammate Johnathan Thurston.

=== 2016 ===
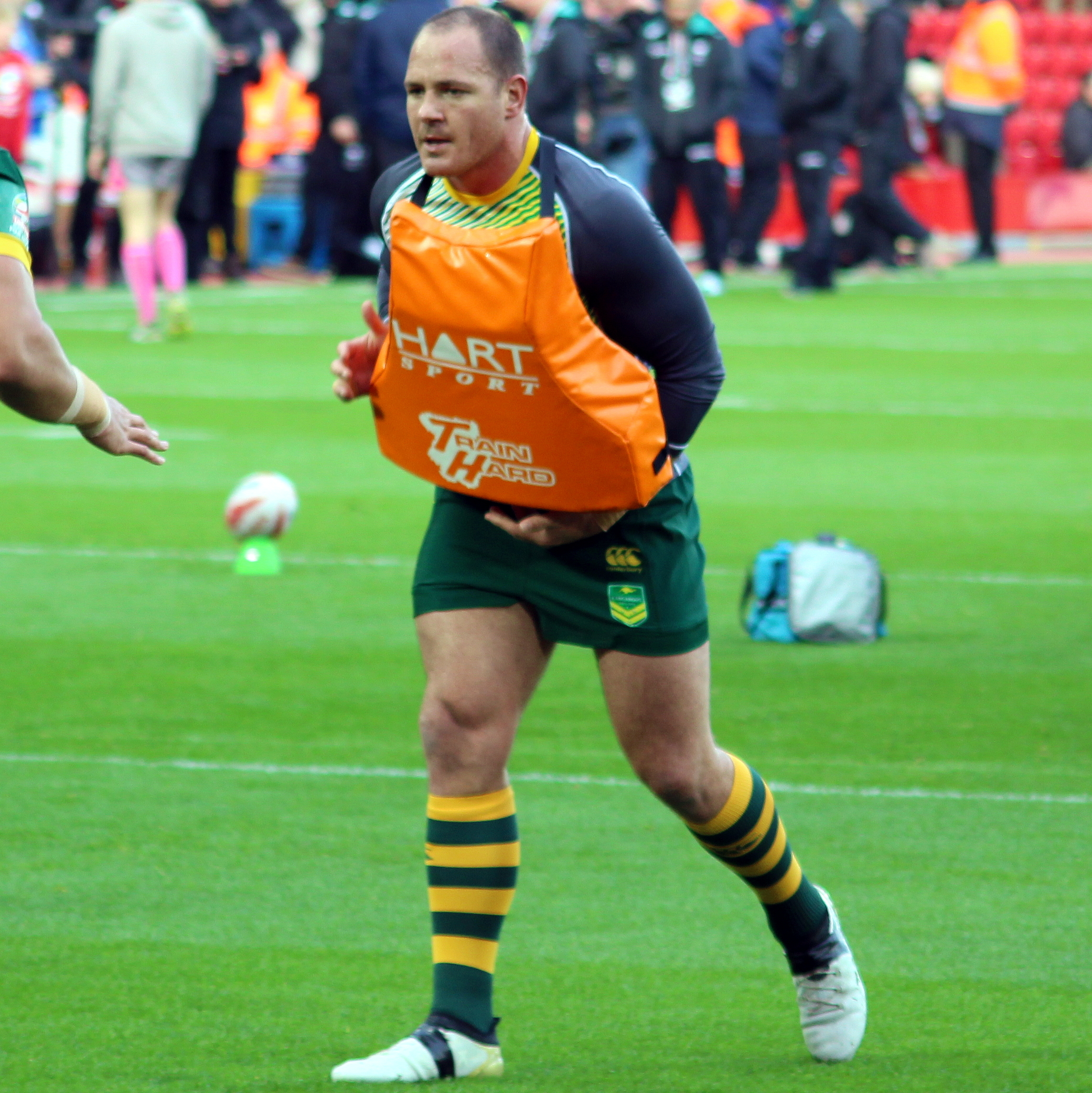
Scott warming up for the Kangaroos in 2016

On 21 February 2016, Scott co-captained the Cowboys' World Club Challenge winning side, starting at prop in the side's 38-4 victory over the Leeds Rhinos at Headingley Stadium. Scott regained his spot in the Australia side for the annual Anzac Test and started at prop in all 3 games of Queensland's State of Origin series win.

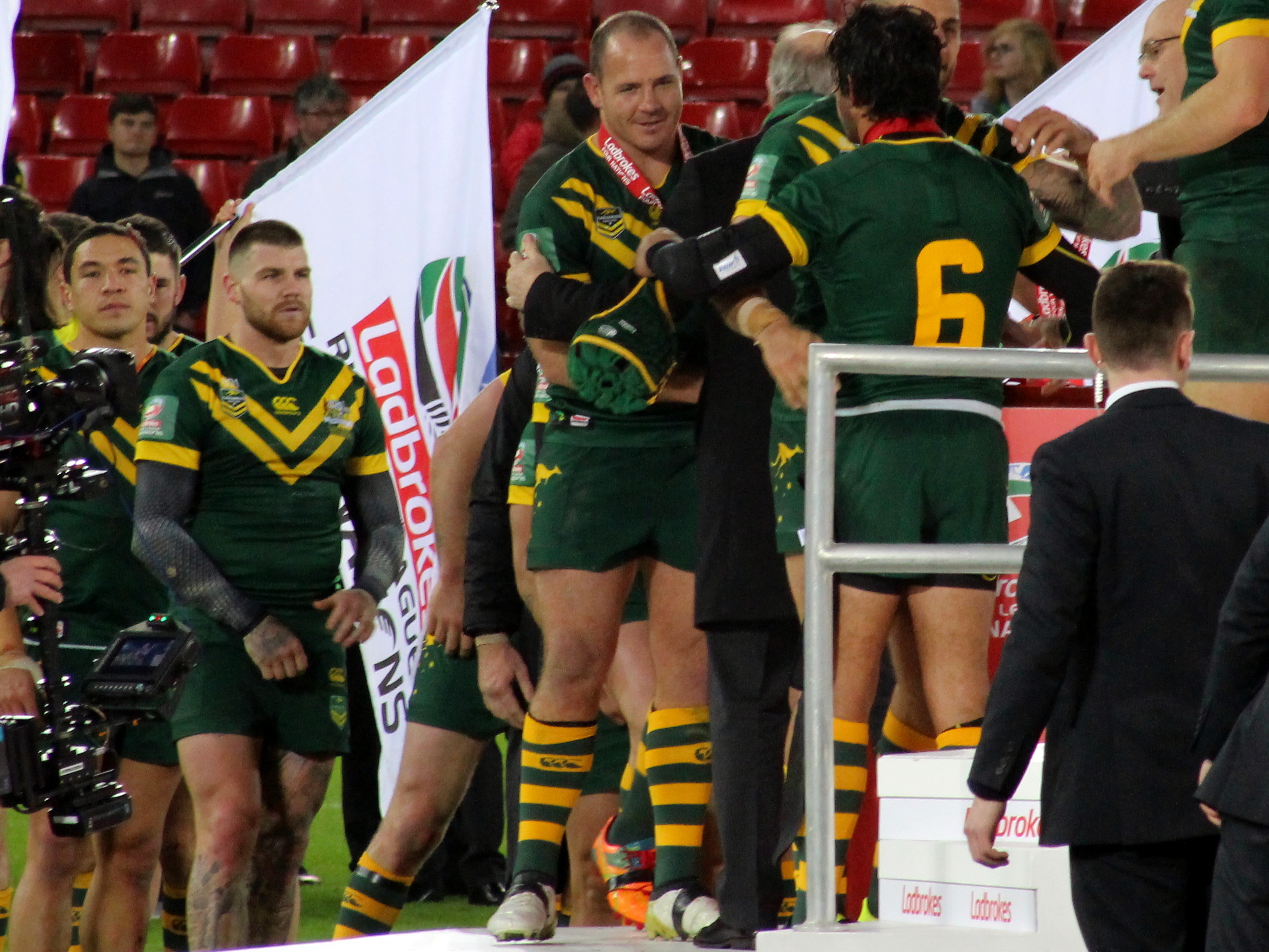
Scott collecting his medal in the 2016 Four Nations Final at Anfield

=== 2017 ===
In Round 2 of the 2017 NRL season, Scott tore his anterior cruciate ligament (ACL) against the Brisbane Broncos, ruling him out for the year. He later re-signed with the club on a two-year deal.

=== 2018 ===
In Round 1 of the 2018 NRL season, Scott successfully returned from his ACL knee injury in the Cowboys' 20–14 win over the Cronulla Sharks. In the Cowboys' Round 24 victory over the Parramatta Eels, Scott played his 250th NRL game for the club, becoming just the third player to do so.

Scott played 18 games for the Cowboys in 2018, missing a number games due to a recurring neck injury, for which he underwent surgery at the end of the season.

=== 2019 ===
On 19 July, Scott announced his retirement from rugby league at the end of the 2019 NRL season. On 20 August, the Cowboys announced that Scott had suffered a mild stroke two days earlier, following a Round 22 loss to the Newcastle Knights. On 4 September, he was discharged from hospital in Brisbane and returned to Townsville. In his final NRL season, Scott played 17 games, scoring two tries.

== Achievements and accolades ==
=== Individual ===
Dally M Prop of the Year: 2011
RLIF Prop of the Year: 2011
Dally M Captain of the Year: 2015
North Queensland Cowboys Player of the Year: 2010, 2013
North Queensland Cowboys Players' Player: 2010, 2013

=== Team ===
2015 NRL Grand Final: North Queensland Cowboys – Winners
2016 World Club Challenge: North Queensland Cowboys – Winners

=== Ilfracombe statue ===
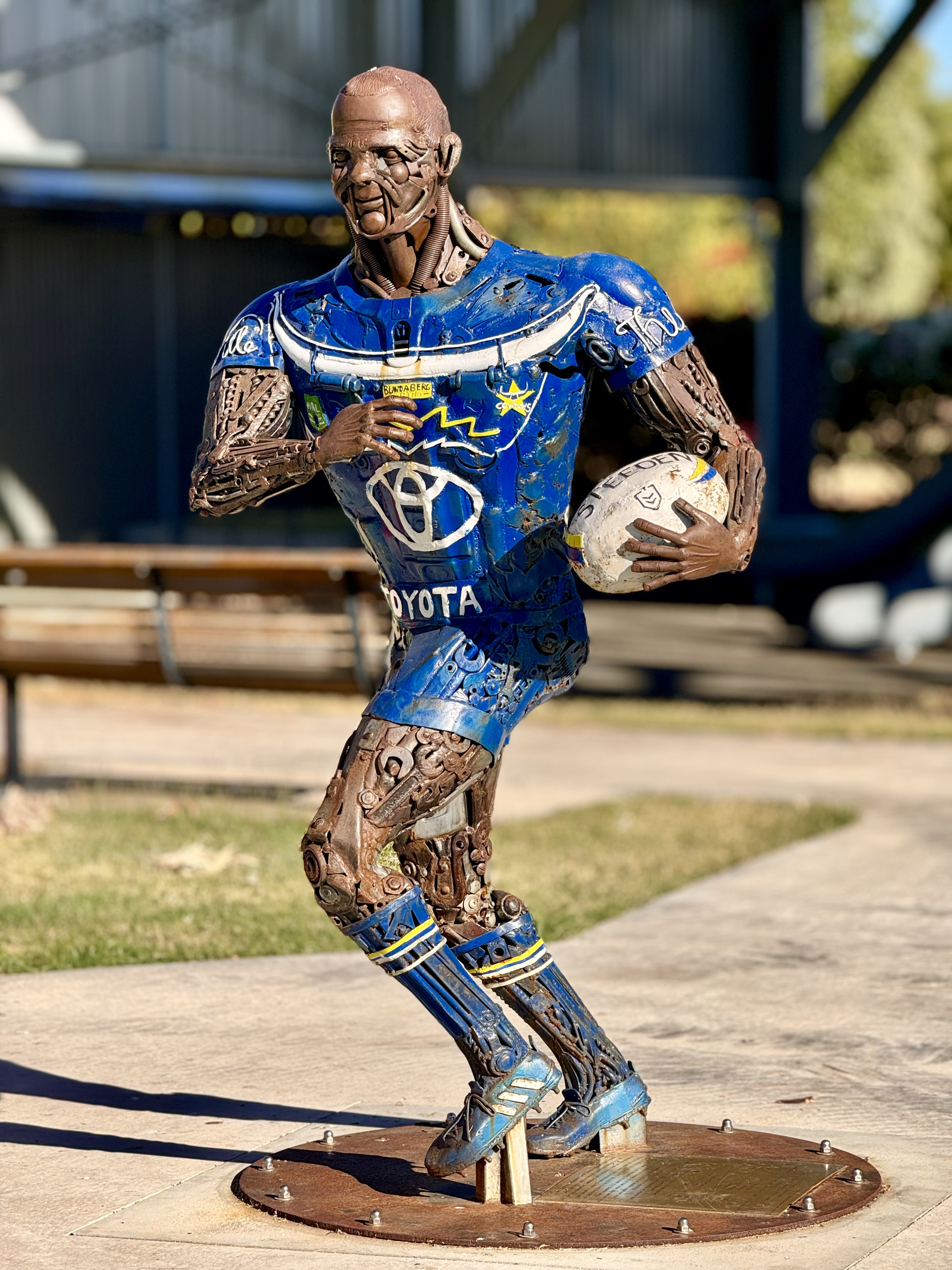
Matthew Scott statue

A 1.9-metre metal sculpture of Matt Scott was unveiled in Ilfracombe on 24 September 2021. It was created by scrap metal artist Milynda Rogers who was commissioned by the Ilfracombe District Progress Association to complete the project with the aim of inspiring the region's youth while also giving the town a focus of pride. Approximately 200 people attended the official unveiling.

== Statistics ==
=== NRL ===
Statistics are correct to the end of the 2019 season

†	Denotes seasons in which Scott won an NRL Premiership

Season	Team	Matches	T	G	GK %	F/G	Pts
2004	North Queensland	1	0	0	—	0	0
2005	North Queensland	3	0	0	—	0	0
2006	North Queensland	22	2	0	—	0	8
2007	North Queensland	23	1	0	—	0	4
2008	North Queensland	6	1	0	—	0	4
2009	North Queensland	23	1	0	—	0	4
2010	North Queensland	23	1	0	—	0	4
2011	North Queensland	22	0	0	—	0	0
2012	North Queensland	18	1	0	—	0	4
2013	North Queensland	22	0	0	—	0	0
2014	North Queensland	20	4	0	—	0	16
2015†	North Queensland	25	3	0	—	0	12
2016	North Queensland	23	2	0	—	0	8
2017	North Queensland	2	0	0	—	0	0
2018	North Queensland	18	1	0	—	0	4
2019	North Queensland	17	2	0	—	0	8
Career totals		268	19	0	—	0	76

=== State of Origin ===
†	Denotes seasons in which Scott won a State of Origin Series

Season	Team	Matches	T	G	GK %	F/G	Pts
2006†	Queensland	1	0	0	—	0	0
2009†	Queensland	1	0	0	—	0	0
2010†	Queensland	3	0	0	—	0	0
2011†	Queensland	3	0	0	—	0	0
2012†	Queensland	3	0	0	—	0	0
2013†	Queensland	3	0	0	—	0	0
2014	Queensland	2	0	0	—	0	0
2015†	Queensland	3	1	0	—	0	4
2016†	Queensland	3	0	0	—	0	0
Career totals		22	1	0	—	0	4

=== Australia ===
†	Denotes seasons in which Scott won a World Cup

Season	Team	Matches	T	G	GK %	F/G	Pts
2010	Australia	2	0	0	—	0	0
2011	Australia	6	1	0	—	0	4
2012	Australia	1	0	0	—	0	0
2013†	Australia	6	0	0	—	0	0
2014	Australia	1	0	0	—	0	0
2015	Australia	1	0	0	—	0	0
2016	Australia	3	0	0	—	0	0
Career totals		20	1	0	—	0	4

== Post playing ==
On 24 February 2023, Scott was inducted into the Cowboys Hall of Fame. In June 2025, Scott was named in the Cowboys Team of 30 Years.

== Personal life ==
Scott and his wife Lauren have two sons, Hugo and Wil and a daughter, Freya.
