= Ray Cashmere =

Australian rugby league footballer (born 1980)

Personal information
- Born: 12 January 1980 (age 46) Kogarah, New South Wales, Australia

Playing information
- Height: 195 cm (6 ft 5 in)
- Weight: 115 kg (18 st 2 lb)
- Position: Prop
Club
Years	Team	Pld	T	G	FG	P
1999	Western Suburbs	1	0	0	0	0
2005	FC.Lézignan	10	0	0	0	0
2005	Wests Tigers	3	0	0	0	0
2006–08	North Qld Cowboys	54	5	0	0	20
2009–11	Salford City Reds	72	5	0	0	20
2012	Wests Tigers	10	1	0	0	4
	Total	150	11	0	0	44
Representative
Years	Team	Pld	T	G	FG	P
2008	City Origin	1	0	0	0	0

Ray Cashmere (born 12 January 1980) is an Australian former rugby league footballer. He previously played for the Wests Tigers and North Queensland Cowboys in the NRL and the Salford City Reds in the Super League.

== Background ==
Ray Cashmere was born in Kogarah, New South Wales, Australia.

== Career ==
A Campbelltown junior at City Kangaroos, ESA, Collies and Macarthur Saints, Cashmere was just 19 when he made his début for a struggling Western Suburbs Magpies in 1999. A 56-16 loss to Canterbury Bulldogs was to be his only appearance for them. The club merged at the end of the season (joining the Balmain Tigers to become the Wests Tigers), seeing Cashmere sign at Parramatta Eels for 2000. The young prop would become the last former Magpie player to be in the NRL in 2012.

Disillusioned after a bad season at Parramatta Eels in 2000, Cashmere returned to his roots, spearheading Macarthur Saints to the Wests A Grade title. After a formative period playing in France, Cashmere joined the Wests Tigers midway through 2005, and was a member of the squad that won the premiership that year. He played 3 games off the bench towards the end of the season, but did not play in any finals matches.

Joining the North Queensland Cowboys in 2006, Cashmere gained a cult following for his particular brand of football, playing 54 games in three seasons with the club. He was described as "one of most powerful front-rowers in the NRL."

In 2008, Cashmere signed a three-year contract with the Salford City Reds in the Super League. Cashmere played 72 games for the club.

Returning to Australia in 2012, Cashmere signed for a stint with the NSW Cup team Illawarra Cutters. Early in the season, Cashmere sought a release to rejoin the Wests Tigers, a request that was initially rejected by the club. Cashmere said, "I’m pissed off and my family’s pissed off - I can’t believe it. I’m bitterly disappointed and I can’t believe they’ve restricted me from achieving my best. The Cutters, a reserve grade team, have essentially stopped a bloke from having a go at a first-grade team."

Cashmere was released to join Wests Tigers in April, the club keen to sign him after injury to Keith Galloway saw them playing with inexperienced props. Football manager Bryan Hider said he was, "a guy who carts his teams forward. He's a monster type of a character, he's a big boy. So hopefully he'll do a job for us." Less than a fortnight later, Cashmere made his return to first grade in a 30-0 victory over the Penrith Panthers, ending the club's 5 game losing streak. His return performance was said to be, "by no means the catalyst for the win, but his move to the Tigers has certainly bolstered the club's decimated forward pack."

Cashmere made 10 appearances from the bench in 2012, with Wests Tigers winning 7 of those matches. He was also a member of the Balmain Ryde Eastwood Tigers side that lost the NSW Cup grand final. At the end of the season, he announced he would be retiring from the NRL and would play for the Shellharbour Sharks in the Illawarra Rugby League competition in 2013.

After a season at Shellharbour, Cashmere signed at CRL Group 6 club, Camden Rams for the 2014 and 2015 seasons. Cashmere would spearhead the Rams to the minor premiership, before losing the Picton Magpies in the Grand Final.

Working in construction in 2016, Cashmere played for his junior club, the Campbelltown City Kangaroos.

== Achievements ==
- 2007: Townsville Bulletin Most Improved (tied with Ashley Graham).
- 2008: Made 297 metres in the Cowboys' clash against the Canberra Raiders - the most of any forward in the 2008 season.
