= Sam Bowie (rugby league) =

Australian rugby league footballer

Personal information
- Born: 30 March 1989 (age 36); Thursday Island, Queensland, Australia

Playing information
- Height: 176 cm (5 ft 9 in)
- Weight: 86 kg (13 st 8 lb)
- Position: Fullback
Club
Years	Team	Pld	T	G	FG	P
2008	North Queensland Cowboys	1	0	0	0	0

Sam Bowie (born 30 March 1989 in Thursday Island, Queensland) is an Australian former rugby league footballer who played for the North Queensland Cowboys and the North Queensland Cowboys U20. His position of choice was at fullback.

== Playing career ==
Bowie made his first grade debut for North Queensland in round 16 of the 2008 NRL season against South Sydney but did not play another first grade match for the club. The match is remembered as the biggest ever comeback in South Sydney's history as they were down 28-4 with less than 30 minutes remaining but went on to win 29-28.
