= Justin Smith (rugby league) =

Australian rugby league footballer

Personal information
- Full name: Justin Smith
- Born: 9 August 1977 (age 49) Narromine, New South Wales, Australia

Playing information
- Height: 194 cm (6 ft 4 in)
- Weight: 95 kg (14 st 13 lb)
- Position: Five-eighth, Second-row, Lock
Club
Years	Team	Pld	T	G	FG	P
2000–02	St. George Illawarra	30	8	4	0	40
2003–04	South Sydney	30	10	49	0	138
2005–08	North Qld Cowboys	82	14	11	0	78
	Total	142	32	64	0	256

Justin Smith (born 9 August 1977 in Narromine, New South Wales) is an Australian former rugby league footballer. A utility player, Smith played for the St. George Illawarra Dragons, South Sydney and the North Queensland Cowboys in the National Rugby League (NRL).

== Playing career ==
Smith made his first grade debut for St George against the Brisbane Broncos in round 24 2000 at WIN Stadium which ended in a 44-14 loss. Smith played with St George up until the end of the 2002 NRL season. His final game for the club was their 40-24 semi final defeat against Cronulla-Sutherland at the Sydney Football Stadium.

In 2003, Smith joined South Sydney. In his first season at Souths he finished as the club's top point scorer however the club finished last on the table and claimed the wooden spoon. In 2004, Smith only made 8 appearances as Souths finished last on the table for a second consecutive year.

In 2005, Smith signed for North Queensland. Smith partnered Johnathan Thurston in the halves at the 2005 NRL Grand Final, the Cowboys' first, which they lost to the Wests Tigers.

Smith retired from the NRL in 2008 following a shoulder injury.
