= Sam Faust =

Australian rugby league footballer

Personal information
- Born: 24 September 1984 Proserpine, Queensland, Australia
- Died: 23 May 2011 (aged 26) Townsville, Queensland, Australia

Playing information
- Height: 186 cm (6 ft 1 in)
- Weight: 100 kg (15 st 10 lb)
- Position: Second-row, Lock
Club
Years	Team	Pld	T	G	FG	P
2007–08	North Qld Cowboys	23	0	0	0	0

Sam Faust (24 September 1984 – 23 May 2011) was an Australian professional rugby league footballer who played for the North Queensland Cowboys in the National Rugby League competition.

== Playing career ==
Faust spent time at the St. George Illawarra Dragons under coach Steve Price. He won the Jersey Flegg best and fairest award in 2003 and the coach's award in 2004 before spending 2005 with the top 25 man squad. However Faust could not break into first grade and he returned to Queensland, joining the North Queensland Cowboys.

He made his first grade debut for the Cowboys in Round 10 of the 2007 season against Parramatta. He went on to play in 13 matches that season and another ten in 2008.

By 2009 Faust was playing part-time for the Central Tigers in the Townsville Rugby League competition and completing a carpentry apprenticeship.

== Later years ==
Faust was diagnosed with Acute myeloid leukemia in 2009 and died on 23 May 2011.

Faust was a father of three.
