= Mark Henry (rugby league) =

Australian rugby league footballer

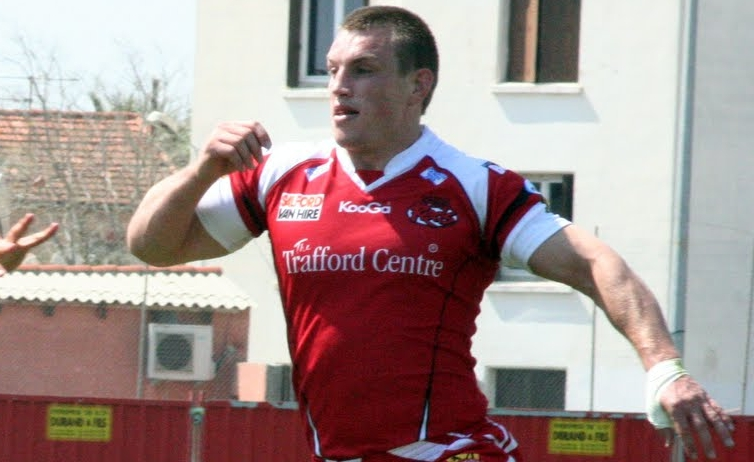

Personal information
- Born: 19 April 1981 (age 44) Canberra, Australian Capital Territory, Australia

Playing information
- Height: 178 cm (5 ft 10 in)
- Weight: 90 kg (14 st 2 lb)
- Position: Centre, Wing
Club
Years	Team	Pld	T	G	FG	P
2006–08	North Qld Cowboys	41	10	0	0	40
2009–11	Salford City Reds	70	26	1	0	106
	Total	111	36	1	0	146

Mark Henry (born 19 April 1981) is an Australian former professional rugby league footballer who played as centre or winger.

== Background ==
Henry was born in the Australian Capital Territory.

== Playing career ==
He joined Super League side the Salford City Reds for the 2009 season.

== Point Scoring Summary – North Queensland Cowboys ==
Season	Appearance	Interchange	Tries	Goals	F/G	Points
2006	7	1	3	-	-	12
2007	10	-	2	-	-	8
2008	23	-	5	-	-	20
