= Obe Geia =

Australian rugby league footballer

Personal information
- Full name: Obadiah Geia
- Born: 15 February 1989 (age 37) Townsville, Queensland, Australia

Playing information
- Height: 178 cm (5 ft 10 in)
- Weight: 78 kg (12 st 4 lb)
- Position: Wing
Club
Years	Team	Pld	T	G	FG	P
2008	North Qld Cowboys	2	0	0	0	0

Obadiah "Obe" Geia (born 12 February 1989, in Townsville, Queensland) is an Australian professional rugby league footballer who has played in the 2000s. He played for the North Queensland Cowboys in the National Rugby League (NRL), as a wing.

While attending Kirwan State High School he played for the Australian schoolboys side, and was the team's top try-scorer on the 2006 tour of Great Britain. He went on to play two matches for the North Queensland Cowboys in the NRL, becoming the first person from the Aboriginal community of Palm Island to do so. An annual schoolboy rugby league tournament is held on Palm Island in his name.
