= Luke O'Donnell =

Australia international rugby league footballer (born 1980)

Personal information
- Full name: Luke O'Donnell
- Born: 22 October 1980 (age 46) Liverpool, New South Wales, Australia

Playing information
- Height: 185 cm (6 ft 1 in)
- Weight: 101 kg (15 st 13 lb)
- Position: Second-row, Lock, Prop
Club
Years	Team	Pld	T	G	FG	P
1999	Balmain Tigers	3	0	0	0	0
2000–03	Wests Tigers	48	3	0	0	12
2004–10	North Qld Cowboys	117	23	0	0	92
2011–12	Huddersfield Giants	27	2	0	0	8
2013	Sydney Roosters	20	1	0	0	4
	Total	215	29	0	0	116
Representative
Years	Team	Pld	T	G	FG	P
2006–10	New South Wales	5	0	0	0	0
2005–06	Australia	11	0	0	0	0
2005–10	NSW City	3	0	0	0	0
2006	Prime Minister's XIII	1	0	0	0	0
2010	NRL All Stars	1	0	0	0	0
- Relatives: Kyle O'Donnell (brother)

Luke O'Donnell (born 22 October 1980) is an Australian former professional rugby league footballer who played in the 1990s, 2000s and 2010s. An Australian international and New South Wales State of Origin representative forward, he previously played his club football in Australia with National Rugby League teams the Balmain Tigers, Wests Tigers, North Queensland Cowboys and the Sydney Roosters, with whom he featured in the club's 13th premiership. O'Donnell also played for two seasons with the Huddersfield Giants in the Super League.

== Early years ==
Born in Liverpool on 22 October 1980 and raised in Manyana, New South Wales, O'Donnell attended Ulladulla High School playing for the Milton-Ulladulla Bulldogs in the Group 7 Rugby League from 1990 to 1996.

His younger brother Kyle O'Donnell also became an NRL footballer.

== Playing career ==
=== Balmain and Wests Tigers ===
O'Donnell made his first grade début with the Balmain Tigers on 31 July 1999. He was sin binned on his début match, a loss to the Sydney City Roosters at Leichhardt Oval. O'Donnell made three appearances off the bench during the 1999 season, all losses.

From 2000, O'Donnell played 4 seasons with the Wests Tigers, playing in 48 games. However, in the second game of the 2003 season O'Donnell received an 11-week suspension for a late, high tackle that left Michael Monaghan with a broken jaw, and played no further games with the Tigers. At the time, it was the second longest suspension in NRL history.

=== North Queensland Cowboys ===
O'Donnell joined the North Queensland Cowboys from the 2004 season, and that season was named the club's player of the year. Also in 2004 he was in the first Cowboys team to make the semi-finals. The following year O'Donnell played at second row in the North Queensland Cowboys' first ever Grand Final in 2005 which they lost to his former club, the Wests Tigers. He was then chosen for the 2005 Tri-Nations team.

Early in the 2007 NRL season, O'Donnell was involved in a "wishbone" tackle that pulled all his hamstring muscles on his left leg away from his pelvic bone, leaving him unable to play for the rest of the season. The opposition players involved, including Liam Fulton and Bronson Harrison were not charged over the incident.

In 2008, O'Donnell received a 7-week suspension relating to 2 separate striking charges and abusing a sideline official.

In August 2008, O'Donnell was named in the preliminary 46-man Kangaroos squad for the 2008 Rugby League World Cup. He was selected for City in the City vs Country match on 8 May 2009. Later that month, he was named in the 17 man squad to represent New South Wales in the opening State of Origin match on 3 June 2009, in Melbourne. Also in 2009 he was named the Cowboys' player of the year for the second time.

In July 2010, it was announced that O'Donnell had signed a four-year deal to play for the Super League team the Huddersfield Giants. During his final NRL season he was selected to play the NRL All Stars Game for the first and only time in his career and was banned for three weeks following an ugly incident in Game II of the 2010 State of Origin series where he dangerously tackled Queensland's Darius Boyd and appeared to headbutt Dave Taylor. Teammate Mitchell Pearce said of the incident,"I thought he was going to eat him!"

O'Donnell was sent off twice during his time with the Cowboys, once in 2006 (playing against the New Zealand Warriors in a match the Cowboys lost 26-0) and once in 2008 (in a match against Penrith which the Cowboys lost in golden point extra time). O'Donnell left the Cowboys as the most suspended player in NRL history, having spent 29 games suspended. "It was really disappointing considering I work so hard and then come game time you feel like you have a target on your head," he later said.

=== Huddersfield Giants ===
O'Donnell joined old Cowboys' teammate David Faiumu at Huddersfield. He was selected for the Exiles squad for the International Origin match against England at Headingley on 10 June 2011.

=== Sydney Roosters ===
On 14 February 2013, it was announced that Luke has signed with the Sydney Roosters on a 1-year deal. He played only 3 times before being suspended for breaching the Code of Conduct.

He featured in the Roosters' premiership winning side at the end of the season. He then announced his retirement from the game on 12 December 2013.

== Personal life ==
After retiring in 2013, O'Donnell has opened a chicken shop named "Tub & Kilo" in Rosebery, Sydney.

On 30 January 2019, video footage emerged of O'Donnell being arrested by NSW Police in June 2018. O'Donnell's parents had called police to the players home after he was reported to be acting erratically. It was reported he had been holding a knife to his chin and was hanging out the window of his third story apartment.

When police arrived O'Donnell said “Listen here you cunt you’re not putting handcuffs on me I’ll fucking smash the fuck out of you get off me". O'Donnell was charged with intimidation, causing malicious damage, assaulting a female senior constable in the execution of her duty and resisting arrest. O’Donnell was convicted and fined $1,600 and placed on a one year community corrections order.

== Achievements ==
=== Individual ===
- 2006 North Queensland Cowboys season's Players' Player of the Year
- 2009 North Queensland Cowboys season's Players' Player of the Year
- 2010 All Stars match Selection

=== Team ===
- 2005 NRL Grand Final – North Queensland Cowboys – Runners-Up
- 2013 NRL Grand Final – Sydney Roosters – Winners
