= Matthew Bartlett =

Australian rugby league footballer

Personal information
- Born: 3 November 1983 (age 43) Wingham, New South Wales, Australia

Playing information
- Height: 194 cm (6 ft 4 in)
- Weight: 98 kg (15 st 6 lb)
- Position: Second-row, Lock
Club
Years	Team	Pld	T	G	FG	P
2006–07	Melbourne Storm	3	0	0	0	0
2007–08	North Qld Cowboys	19	3	0	0	12
	Total	22	3	0	0	12

Matthew Bartlett (born 3 November 1983) is an Australian former professional rugby league footballer. He previously played for the Melbourne Storm and North Queensland Cowboys in the National Rugby League. He primarily played second-row and lock.

== Playing career ==
Born in Wingham, New South Wales, Bartlett played his junior football for the Wingham Tigers before being signed by the Newcastle Knights in 2002. He played for the Knights junior grades from 2002 to 2005 before signing a 1-year contract with the Melbourne Storm starting in 2006. He played for the Storm's Queensland Cup reserve-grade team, the Norths Devils in 2006 and 2007 while also spending some time with the NSW Cup's North Sydney Bears in 2006. In Round 14 of the 2006 NRL season he made his NRL debut for the Storm against the Parramatta Eels. At the beginning of 2007, Bartlett re-signed with the Storm for 2 years.

On 1 June 2007, Bartlett was released from the remaining years of his Melbourne Storm contract and signed a contract with the North Queensland Cowboys.

Bartlett left the Cowboys after 2008. He then joined Lakes United in the Newcastle Rugby League as captain-coach.
