= Brandon Boor =

Australian rugby league footballer

Personal information
- Full name: Brandon Boor
- Born: 27 March 1988 (age 38) Cairns, Queensland, Australia

Playing information
- Height: 190 cm (6 ft 3 in)
- Weight: 90 kg (14 st 2 lb)
- Position: Centre
Club
Years	Team	Pld	T	G	FG	P
2008	North Queensland Cowboys	2	0	0	0	0

Brandon Boor (born 27 March 1988 in Cairns, Queensland) is an Australian former rugby league footballer who played in the 2000s.

== Playing career ==
Boor made his first grade debut for North Queensland in round 16 of the 2008 NRL season against South Sydney. The match is remembered as the biggest ever comeback in South Sydney's history as they were down 28-4 with less than 30 minutes remaining but went on to win 29-28. Boor played one further game for North Queensland in round 18 against the New Zealand Warriors.
