= Dayne Weston =

Australian rugby league footballer

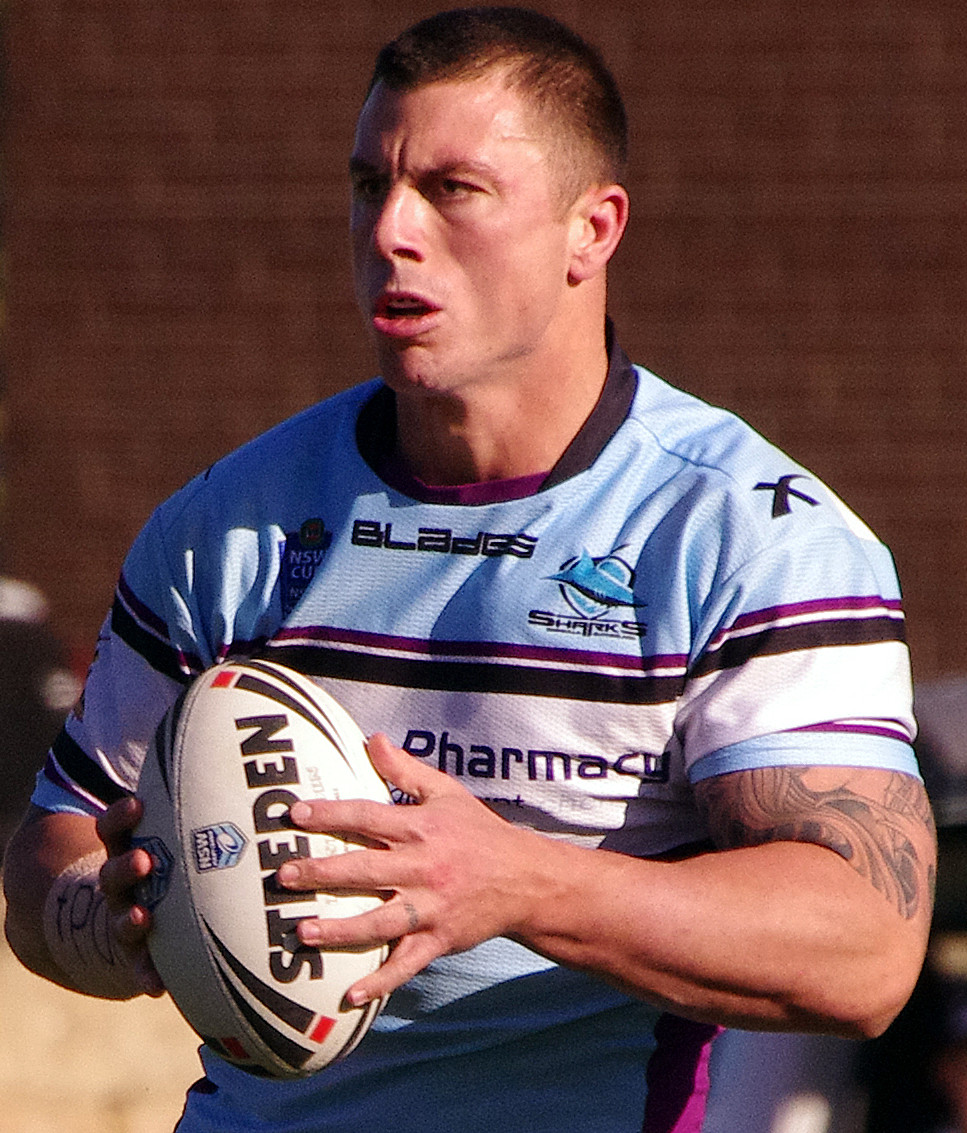

Personal information
- Born: 15 December 1986 (age 39) Goulburn, New South Wales, Australia

Playing information
- Height: 191 cm (6 ft 3 in)
- Weight: 120 kg (18 st 13 lb)
- Position: Prop
Club
| Years | Team | Pld | T | G | FG | P |
|---|---|---|---|---|---|---|
| 2007 | Cronulla Sharks | 10 | 0 | 0 | 0 | 0 |
| 2008–09 | North Qld Cowboys | 21 | 2 | 0 | 0 | 8 |
| 2011–12 | Penrith Panthers | 33 | 0 | 0 | 0 | 0 |
| 2014–15 | Melbourne Storm | 16 | 0 | 0 | 0 | 0 |
| 2016–17 | Leigh Centurions | 43 | 7 | 0 | 0 | 28 |
| 2017(DR) | → Sheffield Eagles | 1 | 0 | 0 | 0 | 0 |
| | Total | 124 | 9 | 0 | 0 | 36 |
Representative
| Years | Team | Pld | T | G | FG | P |
| 2009–10 | Queensland Residents | 2 | 0 | 0 | 0 | 0 |

Dayne Weston (born 15 December 1986) is an Australian former professional rugby league footballer. He played as a prop or second-row forward. He played for the Cronulla-Sutherland Sharks, North Queensland Cowboys, Penrith Panthers and Melbourne Storm in the National Rugby League and Leigh Centurions in the Super League. Weston made his début for the Panthers in the 33–10 victory over Brisbane Broncos.

== Background ==
Weston was born in Goulburn, New South Wales, Australia. He is of Maltese heritage

He played his junior rugby league for hometown club Goulburn Stockmen.

== Playing career ==
Weston made his first grade debut for Cronulla-Sutherland against the Wests Tigers in round 5 of the 2007 NRL season at Campbelltown Stadium. In the 2008 NRL season, Weston joined North Queensland and made 19 appearances for the club as they finished second last on the table. North Queensland only avoided finishing last due to Canterbury's inferior for and against. The following year, Weston only played twice for North Queensland as they finished 12th on the table.

In 2011, Weston joined Penrith and played two seasons at the club. In 2012, he played 21 games as Penrith finished second last above bottom placed Parramatta. In 2014, Weston joined Melbourne.

On 12 July 2015, it was announced that Weston had agreed a 2-year deal with leading Kingstone Press Championship club Leigh Centurions, covering the 2016 and 2017 seasons.

In June 2017, Weston announced he would be retiring at the end of the season, but his retirement was brought forward due to requiring ankle surgery. he played his final game for the club on 22 June 2017 against Widnes Vikings.
