= Willie Tonga =

Australia international rugby league footballer

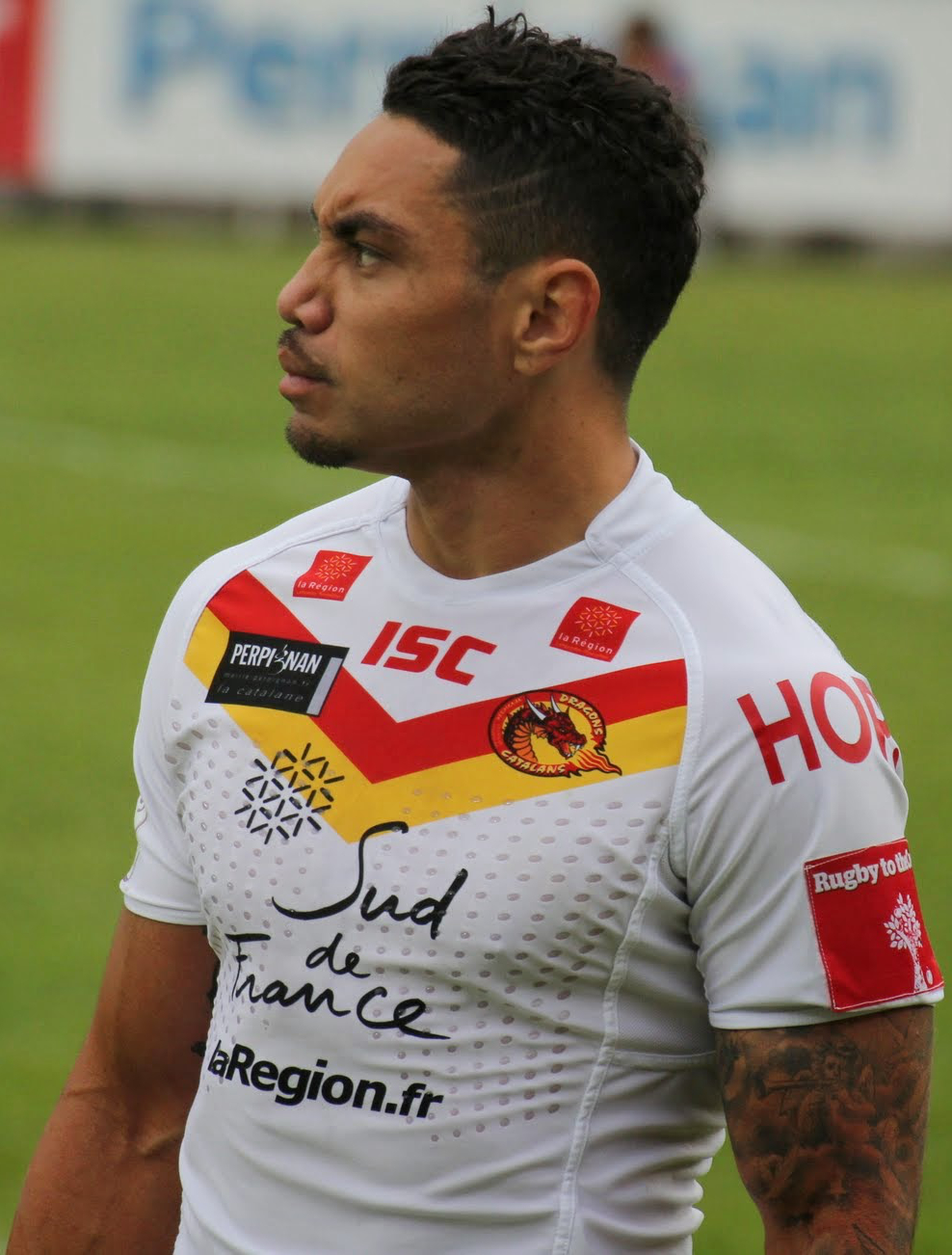

Personal information
- Full name: Villiami Sione Tonga
- Born: 8 August 1983 (age 43) Canberra, Australian Capital Territory, Australia

Playing information
- Height: 185 cm (6 ft 1 in)
- Weight: 100 kg (15 st 10 lb)
- Position: Centre
Club
Years	Team	Pld	T	G	FG	P
2002–03	Parramatta Eels	8	5	0	0	20
2004–08	Canterbury Bulldogs	81	37	0	0	148
2009–11	North Qld Cowboys	60	34	0	0	136
2012–14	Parramatta Eels	32	3	0	0	12
2015	Catalans Dragons	21	7	0	0	28
2016–17	Leigh Centurions	9	1	0	0	4
2017	Bradford Bulls	1	0	0	0	0
	Total	212	87	0	0	348
Representative
Years	Team	Pld	T	G	FG	P
2004–11	Queensland	8	3	0	0	12
2004–11	Australia	12	8	0	0	32
2010	Prime Minister's XIII	1	1	0	0	4
2011	Indigenous All Stars	1	0	0	0	0
- Relatives: Esi Tonga (brother)

Villiami Sione "Willie" Tonga (born 8 August 1983), also known by the nickname of ”Willie", is an Australian former professional rugby league footballer who last played for the Leigh Centurions in the Super League. An Australia international and Queensland State of Origin representative centre, he previously played for the Parramatta Eels, the Canterbury-Bankstown Bulldogs, with whom he won the 2004 NRL Premiership, and the North Queensland Cowboys. He joined French club the Catalans Dragons in 2015 and signed a contract with the Centurions for 2016.

== Early life ==
Born in the former Woden Valley Hospital on 8 August 1983, he is of Aboriginal-Australian and Tongan descent. His full name is Viliami Sione Tonga, known as Willie. He was the first child of Tongan immigrant John (Sione) Tonga and Wiradjuri woman, Maria Naden. Esi Tonga, also a professional rugby league footballer, is his younger brother.

Showing a talent at a young age while living in Peak Hill, New South Wales, Tonga soon adopted rugby league and played for the Cootamundra side while his parents attended the Bimbadeen Bible College. After leaving Cootamundra, Tonga's parents and their five children moved to La Perouse in Sydney, and Tonga played rugby union for the Matraville Sports High School First XV. His parents continued to move around working for the Aboriginal Inland Missionaries and the family finally settled in Cherbourg, Queensland, an Aboriginal community in Queensland.

== Rugby league career ==
=== 2002–2003: Move to Parramatta ===
Scouted by Arthur Beetson, Tonga moved into the Parramatta area. He was signed by the Parramatta Eels and played 8 games over two seasons. He then signed with the Canterbury-Bankstown Bulldogs.

=== 2004–2008: Move to Canterbury-Bankstown ===
Making small but sure career moves, his best-known achievements were yet to be acknowledged when he moved on to the Bulldogs in 2004. His career catapulted in that one year, earning State of Origin selection, allowing him to become the 145th player to be chosen for the Queensland side since 1980. Winning the Dally M Centre of the Year award, Tonga played there for the Bulldogs in their 2004 NRL Grand Final victory over cross-city rivals, the Sydney Roosters. Tonga was selected in the Australian team to go and compete in the end of season 2004 Rugby League Tri-Nations tournament. In the final against Great Britain he played at centre and scored two tries in the Kangaroos' 44–4 victory.

As 2004 NRL premiers, the Canterbury-Bankstown Bulldogs faced Super League IX champions, Leeds in the 2005 World Club Challenge. Tonga played at centre in the club's 32–39 loss. He was also picked for the Australian side for the 2005 Tri-Nations series, making his first full year in the NRL a success. On 1 April 2008, it was announced that Tonga had signed a four-year deal with the North Queensland Cowboys, commencing in 2009. Tonga's final year at Canterbury-Bankstown saw him play only seven games as the club finished last on the table.

=== 2009–2011: Move to North Queensland ===
In April 2009, he was named in the preliminary 25 man squad to represent Queensland in the opening State of Origin match for 2009. In June, Willie Tonga played in Game II of the 2009 State of Origin Series to replace Justin Hodges. Tonga was retained for the third match which the Maroons lost.

In 2010 Tonga played all three Origin matches for the Maroons. At the end of the season he also represented Australia again for the first time in five years in the 2010 Four Nations tournament.

After a number of long-term injuries, Tonga announced in 2011 that he would be re-joining the Parramatta Eels. This decision was welcomed by the fans and senior members of the Parramatta team who he had played with as young player.

=== 2012–2014: Return to Parramatta ===
Tonga's return to the club he debuted with was one of long term injuries, he struggled to get a game, only playing 12 in 2012 as the club finished last for the first time since 1972. In the 2013 preseason, during a trial match, Tonga injured his back and was ruled out indefinitely. In June 2013, Tonga was one of 12 Parramatta players that were told that their futures at the club were uncertain by coach, Ricky Stuart. Tonga returned towards the end of the 2013 NRL season making four appearances as Parramatta finished last for a second consecutive year.

Tonga later re-signed with Parramatta until the end of the 2015 NRL season. In the 2014 NRL season, Tonga played 16 games as Parramatta narrowly missed the finals under new head coach Brad Arthur.

==== Reni Maitua ====
In late 2013 it was revealed that Tonga's best friend Reni Maitua had been suffering from severe depression. In mid 2013, Maitua suffered a breakdown after a game in Brisbane, and days later attempted suicide. Tonga was awake at 1:00am when he received a call from Maitua's sister, who had received a text message which scared her greatly. Tonga chose to drive to Maitua's unit, and found Maitua attempting to take his own life. Tonga believes that had he even arrived 10 seconds later, Maitua would not have survived. Tonga and Maitua told their story on the NRL Footy Show in June 2014 as an attempt to help remove the stigma around mental illness in league.

=== 2015–2017: Super League career ===
On 9 July 2014, it was confirmed that Tonga had signed a contract to play for the Super League club the Catalans Dragons in 2015.

He made his Super League début in round 1 against the 2014 Champions, St. Helens. He scored his first ever Super League try against the Warrington Wolves in round 3.
