= Ben Harris (rugby league) =

Australian rugby league footballer

Personal information
- Born: 24 September 1983 (age 43) Taree, New South Wales, Australia

Playing information
- Height: 180 cm (5 ft 11 in)
- Weight: 99 kg (15 st 8 lb)
- Position: Centre, Second-row
Club
Years	Team	Pld	T	G	FG	P
2002–05	Canterbury Bulldogs	42	16	0	0	64
2005–07	Bradford Bulls	81	26	0	0	104
2008–10	North Qld Cowboys	41	8	0	0	32
	Total	164	50	0	0	200
Representative
Years	Team	Pld	T	G	FG	P
2008	Country NSW	1	1	0	0	4

Ben Harris (born 24 September 1983) is an Australian former professional rugby league footballer who played in the 2000s. He became the first player in the history of the sport to have won grand finals in each hemisphere in consecutive seasons. Harris played in the National Rugby League (NRL) for the Canterbury-Bankstown Bulldogs, with whom he won the 2004 premiership, and the North Queensland Cowboys. He also played in England for the Bradford Bulls, with whom he won 2005's Super League X. He played primarily as a centre.

== Canterbury-Bankstown ==
Of English descent and an Old Bar Pirates junior, Harris made his NRL début for the Canterbury-Bankstown Bulldogs in 2002 at the age of 18. He played in 42 first-grade matches for the club, including as the starting centre for their 2004 NRL Grand Final victory over cross-city rivals, the Sydney Roosters.

== Bradford Bulls ==
Harris joined English club the Bradford Bulls in May 2005. The Bradford Bulls won the Super League premiership in his first season there, and he started at centre in the 2005 Super League Grand Final win over the Leeds Rhinos. He thus won premierships in each hemisphere over consecutive seasons, becoming the first player in the history of rugby league to do so. As Super League champions Bradford faced National Rugby League premiers the Wests Tigers in the 2006 World Club Challenge. Harris played on the wing in the Bradford Bulls' 30–10 victory.

== North Queensland Cowboys ==
Harris returned to the NRL in 2008, signing for the North Queensland Cowboys as a replacement for the retiring Paul Bowman in the centres. In his first season for the Cowboys he was selected for the Country Origin team, his first and only representative football. Over time, he moved into the Cowboys' forward pack, playing in the second row. He retired from professional football after injury plagued seasons in 2009 and 2010.
