= Ty Williams =

Australian rugby league footballer

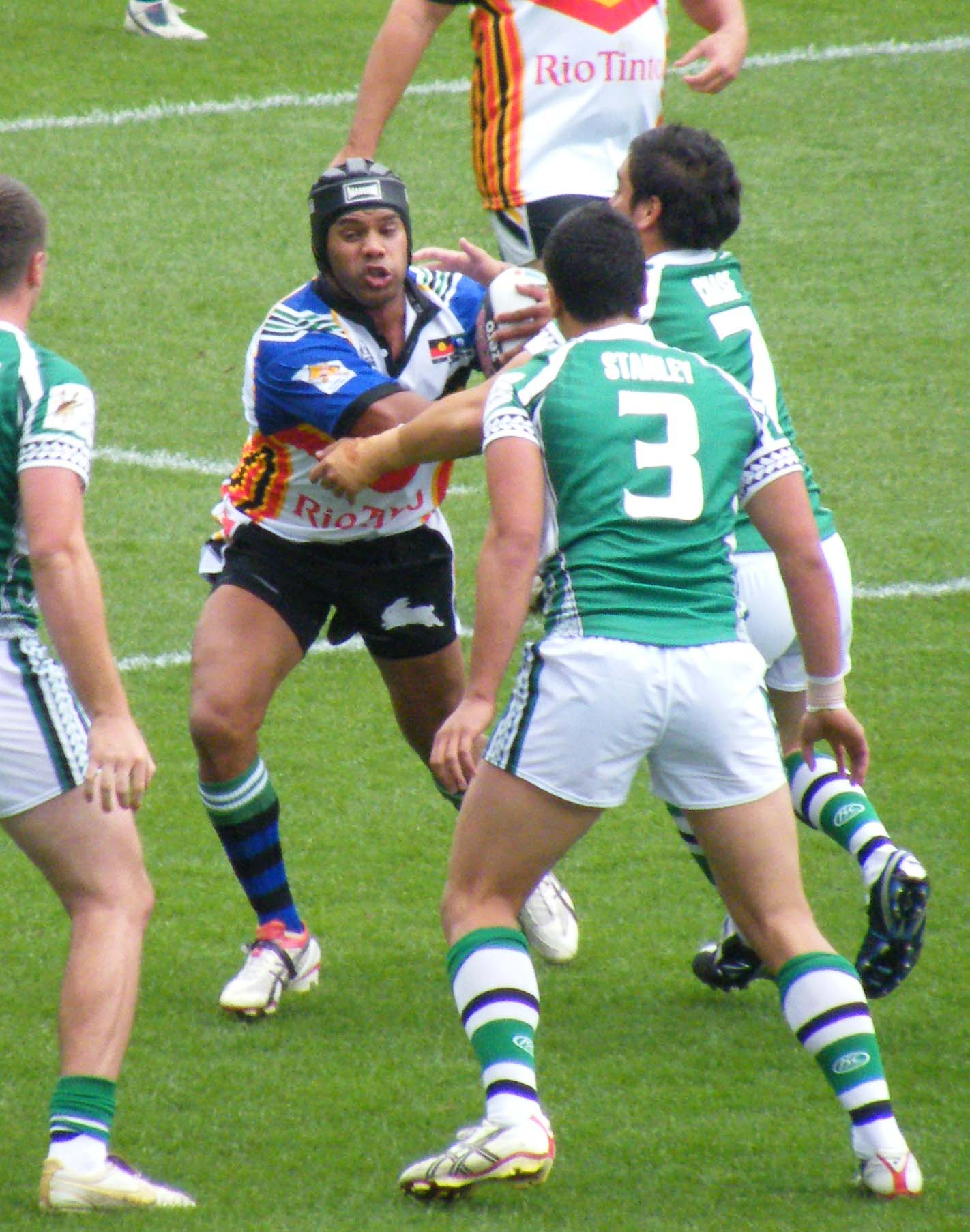

Personal information
- Born: 27 November 1980 (age 44) Innisfail, Queensland, Australia

Playing information
- Height: 180 cm (5 ft 11 in)
- Weight: 90 kg (14 st 2 lb)
- Position: Wing, Centre, Fullback
Club
Years	Team	Pld	T	G	FG	P
2002–10	North Qld Cowboys	151	85	0	0	340
Representative
Years	Team	Pld	T	G	FG	P
2005	Queensland	3	1	0	0	4
2008	Dreamtime Team	1	0	0	0	0
2010	Indigenous All Stars	1	0	0	0	0

Coaching information
Club
Years	Team	Gms	W	D	L	W%
2017–23	Northern Pride	128	51	6	71	40

Ty Williams (born 27 November 1980) is an Australian former professional rugby league footballer who played in the 2000s and 2010s. He played for the North Queensland Cowboys in the National Rugby League (NRL) competition.

== North Queensland Cowboys ==
Williams once scored 42 tries in a season as a centre for the Innisfail Leprechauns in the Cairns District Rugby League A-grade competition. Upon being signed with the Cowboys, he really developed his game and by the end of 2005 he was one of the NRL's best wingers. He played for the Cowboys in the 2005 NRL grand final which was lost to the Wests Tigers.

In 2006 Williams suffered a huge setback, tearing his Achilles tendon in Round 4 and not playing in the NRL until Round 7 of 2007.

Since returning from his injury, Williams has been in and out of the Cowboys squad, often finding form only to have further niggling injuries interfere in his career. He is one of the most versatile outside backs at the club, being able to play on the wing, in the centres, at fullback and even five-eighth.

On 28 July 2010 Williams told the Cowboys that at season's end, he would retire.

== Northern Pride ==
Between 2008 and 2010, while contracted to the Cowboys, Williams played 26 games for the Cowboy's Cairns feeder club, the Northern Pride, scoring 12 tries and being part of the team that made the 2010 Grand Final, although a knee injury prevented him from playing in the final match.

After retiring from first grade at the end of the 2010 season, Williams signed to the Pride, and captained the Queensland Cup side for the next three seasons, playing 52 games at centre, and scoring 19 tries.

Williams retired at the end of the 2013 season, but returned to the Pride in 2017 as coach. He coached the team for the next seven seasons. In 2018 he was won the QRL Coach of the Year award.

== Achievements ==
=== Individual ===
- 2003: North Queensland Club Player of the Year

=== Team ===
- 2005: NRL Grand Final - North Queensland Cowboys - Runners-Up

=== Coach ===
- 2018: QRL - Queensland Cup - Coach of the Year
