= John Williams (rugby league, born 1985) =

Australian rugby league footballer

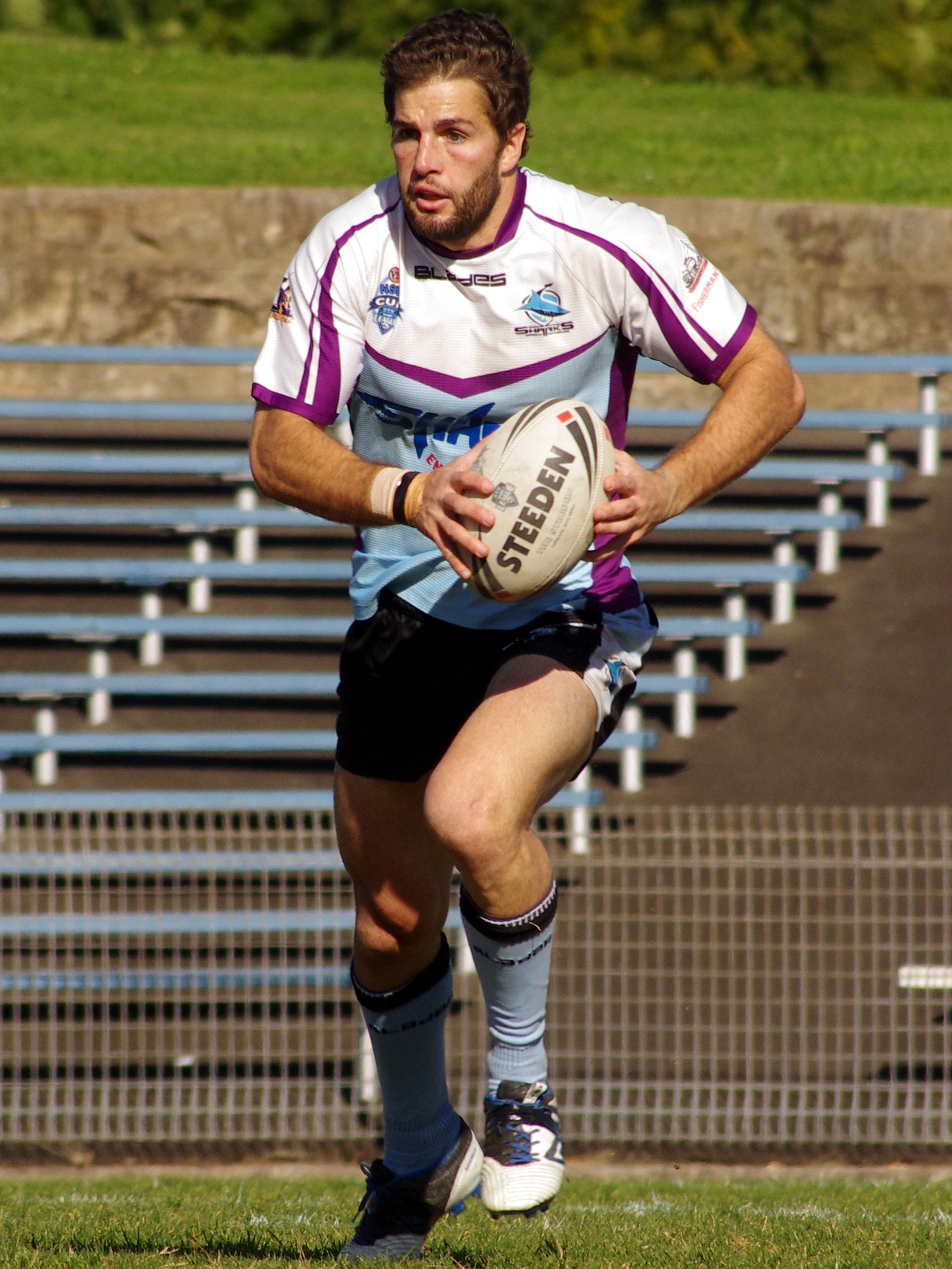

Personal information
- Full name: John Williams
- Born: 5 January 1985 (age 41) Sydney, New South Wales, Australia

Playing information
- Height: 185 cm (6 ft 1 in)
- Weight: 95 kg (14 st 13 lb)
- Position: Wing
Club
Years	Team	Pld	T	G	FG	P
2005–06	Parramatta Eels	6	5	0	0	20
2007	Sydney Roosters	12	5	0	0	20
2008–10	North Qld Cowboys	54	2	48	0	188
2011–12	Cronulla Sharks	32	12	27	0	102
	Total	104	24	75	0	330
Representative
Years	Team	Pld	T	G	FG	P
2005–06	NSW Residents	2	2	0	0	8
- Relatives: David Williams (brother)

John Williams (born 5 January 1985) is an Australian former professional rugby league player who played in the 2000s. He played as a wing in the National Rugby League for the Parramatta Eels, Sydney Roosters, North Queensland Cowboys and Cronulla-Sutherland Sharks. Williams was considered a rugby league journeymen, joining four clubs over his eight-year career.

== Background ==
Williams is the older brother of Australian international rugby league player, David Williams.

He was given the choice to play first grade cricket but instead he chose to play rugby league.

== Playing career ==
Williams made his first grade debut for Parramatta in round 17 of the 2005 NRL season against South Sydney at Parramatta Stadium scoring a try in a 52–16 victory. Williams made one further appearance that year as the club won the Minor Premiership.

In the 2006 NRL season, Williams made four appearances for Parramatta and scored four tries including a hat-trick against Melbourne in round 14 at Parramatta Stadium. At the end of 2006, Williams was released by Parramatta and he signed a one-year deal to join the Sydney Roosters. At the end of 2007, Williams was not offered a contract extension and he signed with North Queensland for the 2008 NRL season.

While he was a fringe player for a large part of his career, 2008 was certainly a highlight for Williams. Williams was a regular starter and leading point scorer for the Cowboys in that year with 96 points. Over his three years at North Queensland, Williams played a total of 54 games, making it easily the most successful stage of his career.

In October 2010, Williams signed with the Cronulla-Sutherland Sharks for the 2011 NRL season. In 2012, he announced his retirement at the age of 27. Following his retirement, he was one of seventeen Cronulla players found guilty of using illegal substances under the club's 2011 supplements program, having a twelve-month suspension (which had already expired due to backdating) recorded against his name.
