= 2007 North Queensland Cowboys season =

Coordinates: 19°18′58″S 146°42′43″E

- NRL Rank: 3rd
- Play-off result: Lost Preliminary Final (v Manly Sea Eagles, 6–28)
- record: Wins: 15; draws: 0; losses: 9
- Points scored: For: 547; against: 618

Team information
- CEO: Peter Parr
- Coach: Graham Murray
- Captain: Johnathan Thurston
- Stadium: Dairy Farmers Stadium
- Avg. attendance: 20,108
- High attendance: 25,926 (vs. Brisbane Broncos, Round 18)

Top scorers
- Tries: Matthew Bowen (22)
- Goals: Johnathan Thurston (78)
- Points: Johnathan Thurston (196)
← 2006	2008 →

The 2007 North Queensland Cowboys season was the 13th in the club's history. Coached by Graham Murray and captained by Johnathan Thurston, they competed in the NRL's Telstra Premiership. They finished the regular season in 3rd place, falling one game short of the Grand Final after losing to the Manly-Warringah Sea Eagles.

== Season summary ==
The Cowboys started the 2007 NRL season strongly, winning their first four games. By the halfway point of the season, they were placed inside the top four, despite losing key forward Luke O'Donnell for the season in Round 4.

In August, News Limited sold its majority stake in the club to the Cowboys Leagues Club for just over $2 million. News Limited took over the club in late 2001, helping it through a turbulent and difficult era.

Following five losses from seven games, the Cowboys dropped to 8th place in Round 20. A strong finish to the regular season, in which they won their final five games, saw them finish in 3rd, their highest ever placing at the time. Their first two finals games were played at home, defeating the Canterbury Bulldogs (20–18) and the New Zealand Warriors (49–12), to move within one game of the Grand Final. The Cowboys' season ended the following week, losing to Manly in the preliminary final.

Club legend Paul Bowman retired at the end of the 2007 season. The last foundation player from the club's inaugural season, Bowman played 203 games for the Cowboys over 13 seasons. The club's Player of the Year medal was named in his honour following his retirement. He became an assistant coach with the club in 2008. 2007 also saw the debut of 19-year-old Scott Bolton, who would go on to play over 150 games for the Cowboys and be a member of their 2015 NRL Grand Final and 2016 World Club Challenge winning sides.

=== Milestones ===
- Round 1: Sione Faumuina and Jason Smith made their debuts for the club.
- Round 3: Justin Smith played his 50th game for the club.
- Round 4: Scott Bolton made his NRL debut for the club.
- Round 6: Ben Vaeau made his debut for the club.
- Round 7: Johnathan Thurston played his 50th game for the club.
- Round 7: Scott Minto made their debuts for the club.
- Round 7: Ben Farrar made his NRL debut for the club and scored his first NRL try.
- Round 9: Brett Anderson made his debut for the club.
- Round 9: Scott Bolton scored his first NRL try.
- Round 10: Sam Faust made his NRL debut for the club.
- Round 11: John Frith made his NRL debut for the club.
- Round 13: Ty Williams played his 100th game for the club.
- Round 13: Matthew Bartlett made his debut for the club.
- Round 13: Jackson Nicolau made his NRL debut for the club.
- Round 18: Aaron Payne played his 100th game for the club.
- Round 20: Matthew Bowen played his 150th game for the club.
- Round 22: Carl Webb played his 50th game for the club.
- Round 25: Paul Bowman played his 200th game for the club, the first player to do so.
- Finals Week 2: Jacob Lillyman played his 50th game for the club.

== Squad List ==
North Queensland Cowboys NRL Squad 2007
First team squad			Coaching staff
Brett Anderson – CE; Matthew Bartlett – SR; Scott Bolton – SR; Brenton Bowen – WG; Matthew Bowen – FB; Paul Bowmane – CE; Ray Cashmere – PR; David Faiumu – HK; Ben Farrar – CE; Sione Faumuina – LK; Sam Faust – PR	John Frith – PR; Ashley Graham – WG; Mark Henry – CE; Rod Jensen – CE; Karl Johnson – CE; Jacob Lillyman – PR; Scott Minto – WG; Shane Muspratt – FE; Jackson Nicolau – FE; Luke O'Donnell – LK; Aaron Payne – HK	Matthew Scott – PR; Jason Smith – FE; Justin Smith – FE; Steve Southern – SR; Neil Sweeney – WG; Johnathan Thurston (c) – HB; Shane Tronc – PR; Ben Vaeau – PR; Carl Webb – PR; Colin Wilkie – CE; Ty Williams – WG	Head coach: Graham Murray; Assistant coaches: Ian Millward (assistant coach); Grant Bell (assistant coach); Kelly Egan (football manager); Glen Murphy (strength & conditioning coach); Steve Hooper (Strength & Conditioning Trainer); Legend: (c) Captain(s); (vc) Vice-captain(s)

== Squad Movement ==
=== 2007 Gains ===
Player	Signed from
Matthew Bartlett	Melbourne Storm
Ben Farrar	Parramatta Eels
Sione Faumuina	Warriors
Karl Johnson	North Sydney Bears
Scott Minto	Brisbane Broncos
Jackson Nicolau	Melbourne Storm
Jason Smith	Canberra Raiders
Ben Vaeau	Brisbane Broncos
Colin Wilkie	Melbourne Storm

=== 2007 Losses ===
Player	Signed To
Clint Amos	Gold Coast Titans
Jason Barsley	Retired
Gavin Cooper	Gold Coast Titans
Mark Dalle Cort	Celtic Crusaders
Brett Firman	Penrith Panthers
Josh Hannay	Cronulla Sharks
Rod Jensen	Huddersfield Giants (mid-season)
Ben Lowe	South Sydney Rabbitohs
Brent McConnell	Brisbane Broncos
Travis Norton	Retired
Mitchell Sargent	Newcastle Knights
Matt Sing	Hull F.C.
Malo Solomona	Auckland Lions
Daniel Strickland	University Saints RLFC
Robert Tanielu	Retired

== Ladder ==
2007 NRL season
Pos	Team	Pld	W	D	L	B	PF	PA	PD	Pts
1	Melbourne Storm	24	21	0	3	1	627	277	+350	44
2	Manly-Warringah Sea Eagles	24	18	0	6	1	597	377	+220	38
3	North Queensland Cowboys	24	15	0	9	1	547	618	−71	32
4	New Zealand Warriors	24	13	1	10	1	593	434	+159	29
5	Parramatta Eels	24	13	0	11	1	573	481	+92	28
6	Canterbury-Bankstown Bulldogs	24	12	0	12	1	575	528	+47	26
7	South Sydney Rabbitohs	24	12	0	12	1	408	399	+9	26
8	Brisbane Broncos	24	11	0	13	1	511	476	+35	24
9	Wests Tigers	24	11	0	13	1	541	561	−20	24
10	Sydney Roosters	24	10	1	13	1	445	610	−165	23
11	Cronulla-Sutherland Sharks	24	10	0	14	1	463	403	+60	22
12	Gold Coast Titans	24	10	0	14	1	409	559	−150	22
13	St George Illawarra Dragons	24	9	0	15	1	431	509	−78	20
14	Canberra Raiders	24	9	0	15	1	522	652	−130	20
15	Newcastle Knights	24	9	0	15	1	418	708	−290	20
16	Penrith Panthers	24	8	0	16	1	539	607	−68	18

== Fixtures ==
=== Pre-season ===
Date	Round	Opponent	Venue	Score	Tries	Goals	Attendance
17 February	Trial 1	Canberra Raiders	Browne Park	10 – 28	-	-	-
24 February	Trial 2	Warriors	Leprechaun Park	32 – 14	B. Bowen (2), Bolton, M. Bowen, Payne, Lillyman	Thurston (4/6)	-
3 March	Trial 3	Manly Sea Eagles	Barlow Park	10 – 14	Bolton, Justin Smith	Thurston (2/2)	-

=== Regular season ===
Date	Round	Opponent	Venue	Score	Tries	Goals	Attendance
16 March	Round 1	Brisbane Broncos	Suncorp Stadium	23 – 16	Graham (2), M. Bowen, Henry	Thurston (3/5), M. Bowen (1 FG)	50,416
24 March	Round 2	Sydney Roosters	Dairy Farmers Stadium	43 – 6	B. Bowen (2), M. Bowen (2), Thurston (2), O'Donnell	Thurston (6/6), Graham (1/1), Payne (1 FG)	21,396
31 March	Round 3	St George Illawarra Dragons	WIN Stadium	22 – 18	B. Bowen, Bowman, Graham, Thurston	Thurston (3/4)	10,232
7 April	Round 4	Wests Tigers	Dairy Farmers Stadium	25 – 24	Graham (2), M. Bowen, Sweeney	Thurston (4/4), M. Bowen (1 FG)	21,879
15 April	Round 5	Warriors	Mt Smart Stadium	14 – 34	B. Bowen, M. Bowen, Thurston	Thurston (1/3)	11,260
23 April	Round 6	South Sydney Rabbitohs	Dairy Farmers Stadium	6 – 10	Bowman	Thurston (1/1)	17,768
28 April	Round 7	Manly Sea Eagles	Dairy Farmers Stadium	30 – 26	M. Bowen (2), B. Bowen, Farrar, Ja. Smith	Thurston (5/6)	18,682
7 May	Round 8	Gold Coast Titans	Carrara Stadium	24 – 10	M. Bowen, Bowman, Jensen	Thurston (6/6)	17,806
12 May	Round 9	Penrith Panthers	Dairy Farmers Stadium	12 – 22	Anderson, Bolton	Thurston (2/2)	17,393
19 May	Round 10	Parramatta Eels	Parramatta Stadium	14 – 44	Faumuina, Graham, Minto	Graham (1/3)	10,182
25 May	Round 11	Canterbury Bulldogs	Suncorp Stadium	26 – 16	M.Bowen (2), Faumuina, Tronc	Thurston (5/5)	15,412
2 June	Round 12	Cronulla Sharks	Dairy Farmers Stadium	26 – 24	Williams (2), Minto, Scott, Sweeney	Thurston (3/5)	20,075
9 June	Round 13	Sydney Roosters	Sydney Football Stadium	30 – 64	M. Bowen (2), Bartlett, Southern, Tronc	Graham (5/5)	4,186
16 June	Round 14	Melbourne Storm	Dairy Farmers Stadium	12 – 58	B. Bowen, M. Bowen, William	Thurston (0/3)	20,023
23 June	Round 15	Canberra Raiders	Canberra Stadium	28 – 24	B. Bowen (2), M. Bowen (2), Thurston	Thurston (4/5)	11,263
	Round 16	Bye					
7 July	Round 17	Warriors	Dairy Farmers Stadium	18 – 12	Sione Faumuina, Graham, Webb	Thurston (2/2), Graham (1/1)	19,864
13 July	Round 18	Brisbane Broncos	Dairy Farmers Stadium	16 – 24	Graham (2), M. Bowen	Graham (2/3)	25,926
22 July	Round 19	South Sydney Rabbitohs	Telstra Stadium	14 – 20	M. Bowen, Graham, Minto	Thurston (1/3)	10,022
30 July	Round 20	Wests Tigers	Leichhardt Oval	10 – 54	Bartlet, Ju. Smith	Thurston (1/2)	17,101
4 August	Round 21	Canberra Raiders	Dairy Farmers Stadium	28 – 22	Farrar (2), Graham, M. Bowen, Thurston	Graham (2/5), Thurston (0/1)	15,791
13 August	Round 22	Penrith Panthers	CUA Stadium	30 – 26	Graham (3), B. Bowen, M. Bowen, Ju. Smith	Thurston (3/5)	7,618
18 August	Round 23	St George Illawarra Dragons	Dairy Farmers Stadium	24 – 14	M. Bowen, Bowman, Cashmere, Ja. Smith	Thurston (4/4)	18,721
24 August	Round 24	Newcastle Knights	EnergyAustralia Stadium	34 – 18	Graham (2), M. Bowen, Sweeney, Thurston, Williams	Thurston (5/6)	12,264
31 August	Round 25	Canterbury Bulldogs	Dairy Farmers Stadium	38 – 32	Farrar, Williams, Ju. Smith, Thurston	Thurston (7/7)	24,050
Legend: Win Loss Draw Bye

=== Finals ===
Date	Round	Opponent	Venue	Score	Tries	Goals	Attendance
8 September	Qualifying Final	Canterbury Bulldogs	Dairy Farmers Stadium	20 – 18	Thurston (2), Bowman	Thurston (4/4)	24,004
16 September	Semi Final	Warriors	Dairy Farmers Stadium	49 – 12	Farrar (2), M. Bowen, Cashmere, Graham, Henry, Ja. Smith, Williams	Thurston (7/7), Bowman (1/1), M. Bowen (1 FG)	21,487
22 September	Preliminary Final	Manly Sea Eagles	SFS	6 – 28	Lillyman	Thurston (1/1)	32,611
Legend: Win Loss Draw Bye

== Statistics ==
Name	App	T	G	FG	Pts
Brett Anderson	1	1	-	-	4
Matthew Bartlett	13	2	-	-	8
Scott Bolton	6	1	-	-	4
Brenton Bowen	16	9	-	-	36
Matthew Bowen	27	22	-	3	91
Paul Bowman	21	5	1	-	22
Ray Cashmere	24	2	-	-	8
David Faiumu	20	-	-	-	-
Ben Farrar	11	7	-	-	28
Sione Faumuina	18	3	-	-	12
Sam Faust	13	-	-	-	-
John Frith	1	-	-	-	-
Ashley Graham	22	18	12	-	96
Mark Henry	10	2	-	-	8
Rod Jensen	6	1	-	-	4
Jacob Lillyman	21	1	-	-	4
Scott Minto	14	3	-	-	12
Shane Muspratt	3	-	-	-	-
Jackson Nicolau	1	-	-	-	-
Luke O'Donnell	4	1	-	-	4
Aaron Payne	27	-	-	1	1
Matthew Scott	23	1	-	-	4
Jason Smith	20	3	-	-	12
Justin Smith	24	3	-	-	12
Steve Southern	19	1	-	-	4
Neil Sweeney	11	3	-	-	12
Johnathan Thurston	25	10	78	-	196
Shane Tronc	17	2	-	-	8
Ben Vaeau	8	-	-	-	-
Carl Webb	18	1	-	-	4
Ty Williams	15	7	-	-	28
Totals		109	91	4	622

== Representatives ==
The following players played a representative match in 2007

	ANZAC Test	State of Origin 1	State of Origin 2	State of Origin 3	Trans-Tasman Test
Matthew Bowen	-	-	-	Queensland	-
David Faiumu	New Zealand	-	-	-	New Zealand
Jacob Lillyman	-	Queensland	Queensland	-	-
Johnathan Thurston	Australia	Queensland	Queensland	Queensland	-
Carl Webb	-	-	Queensland	Queensland	-

== Honours ==
=== League ===
- Dally M Medal: Johnathan Thurston
- Dally M Fullback of the Year: Matthew Bowen
- Dally M Halfback of the Year: Johnathan Thurston
- Rugby League Week Player of the Year: Matthew Bowen
- Rugby League Week Player of the Year: Johnathan Thurston

=== Club ===
- Paul Bowman Medal: Matthew Bowen
- Player's Player: Matthew Bowen
- Club Person of the Year: Tim Nugent and Nicole Balanzategui
- Rookie of the Year: Sam Faust
- Most Improved: Ashley Graham and Ray Cashmere

== Feeder Clubs ==
=== Queensland Cup ===
- North Queensland Young Guns - 1st, lost preliminary final
