= 2007 Penrith Panthers season =

← 2006	2008 →

The 2007 Penrith Panthers season was the 41st in the club's history. They competed in the 2007 NRL season and finished in last place.

Three-quarter Michael Jennings was named the Panthers' rookie of the year and player of the year.

== Ladder ==
2007 NRL season
Pos	Team	Pld	W	D	L	B	PF	PA	PD	Pts
1	Melbourne Storm	24	21	0	3	1	627	277	+350	44
2	Manly-Warringah Sea Eagles	24	18	0	6	1	597	377	+220	38
3	North Queensland Cowboys	24	15	0	9	1	547	618	−71	32
4	New Zealand Warriors	24	13	1	10	1	593	434	+159	29
5	Parramatta Eels	24	13	0	11	1	573	481	+92	28
6	Canterbury-Bankstown Bulldogs	24	12	0	12	1	575	528	+47	26
7	South Sydney Rabbitohs	24	12	0	12	1	408	399	+9	26
8	Brisbane Broncos	24	11	0	13	1	511	476	+35	24
9	Wests Tigers	24	11	0	13	1	541	561	−20	24
10	Sydney Roosters	24	10	1	13	1	445	610	−165	23
11	Cronulla-Sutherland Sharks	24	10	0	14	1	463	403	+60	22
12	Gold Coast Titans	24	10	0	14	1	409	559	−150	22
13	St George Illawarra Dragons	24	9	0	15	1	431	509	−78	20
14	Canberra Raiders	24	9	0	15	1	522	652	−130	20
15	Newcastle Knights	24	9	0	15	1	418	708	−290	20
16	Penrith Panthers	24	8	0	16	1	539	607	−68	18

== Players ==
Current to Round 19, 2007
Player	Appearances	Tries	Goals	F Goals	Points

=== Player movements ===
Gains

2007 Signings/Transfers
Player	Previous club	Years signed	Until the end of

Losses

Losses
Player	Notes

Re-Signings

Re-Signings
