= 2007 Bulldogs RLFC season =

| ← 2006 | 2008 → |

The 2007 Bulldogs RLFC season was the 73rd in the club's history. They competed in the NRL's 2007 Telstra Premiership, finishing the regular season 6th (out of 16) and reaching the semi-finals before being knocked out by the Parramatta Eels.

== Season summary ==
The Bulldogs' 2007 NRL Premiership campaign began against the Newcastle Knights. While the Knights won 25–24 in a dramatic season opener at EnergyAustralia Stadium, the game will long be remembered for the sending off of Sonny Bill Williams for a swinging left arm which left Andrew Johns lying face down on the turf unconscious in the fourth minute. The Bulldogs capitalised on this, at one point leading 24–8 before a comeback by the Knights saw them lose by just one point.

The Bulldogs then suffered a gigantic loss to Penrith a week later, before recording their first win of the season against new club the Gold Coast Titans in front of a home crowd of 14,675. Round four saw them clash with newly crowned heavyweights South Sydney, who had yet to lose a game. The Bulldogs rose to the occasion, disposing of the highly fancied Rabbitohs 34–10 in front of a record Telstra Stadium crowd of 34,315. This was deemed a South Sydney home game.

Round five saw the Bulldogs host a tense match against the Manly Sea Eagles, ultimately going down by just two points in what was a very physical game at Telstra Stadium. A large crowd of 20,269 attended the match, which saw Hazem El Masri take the field in his 250th First Grade Premiership Match. The 'Dogs then travelled to Parramatta in Round six, and produced a remarkable comeback from 16–6 down just before halftime to snare victory 21–18 over the Eels in front of over 18,000 fans.

Round seven's clash was set to be a bumper one at Telstra Stadium, but a disappointing crowd and performance from the Bulldogs saw them fall to the Wests Tigers 34–18. The next week, the Bulldogs returned to form with a comfortable 30–16 win against the Newcastle Knights at Telstra Stadium. Hazem El Masri scored a try and 5 conversions to take his career tally to 1910 points, only the 6th player in history to do so.

Round nine was the first Monday Night game for the Bulldogs in 2007, playing against the in-form Melbourne Storm at Olympic Park. With Origin selections the next day, both teams were eager to impress. It was a disappointing game for the 'Dogs, going down 38–14. Round ten, and the Bulldogs returned to Telstra Stadium, taking on the Sharks minus their Origin stars. A late comeback from the Bulldogs in the second half was not enough, losing 30–20 in front of only 12,384 fans.

There were many Origin stars backing up from both teams for the round eleven clash with the North Queensland Cowboys at Suncorp Stadium. Johnathan Thurston and Matthew Bowen were brilliant as they carved up the 'Dogs defence, and although the Bulldogs rallied for a late comeback, it would again not be enough as the Cowboys ran away to a 26–16 win, leaving the Bulldogs with their 3rd straight loss and sitting 14th on the ladder.

Round twelve was a crucial match for the Bulldogs, travelling across the Tasman to face the New Zealand Warriors at Mount Smart Stadium. Under pressure, the Bulldogs broke their three-game losing streak with a 40–20 win over a 12-man Warriors outfit, only their 5th win of the season. Round thirteen was a bye.

Returning from the bye, the Bulldogs took on the Brisbane Broncos at Telstra Stadium. A sloppy affair, the Bulldogs went down 19–12, and dropped down to 13th on the ladder.

Again under pressure, the Bulldogs had another tough assignment in the Manly Sea Eagles at Brookvale Oval. It was a stunning win for the Bulldogs, defeating the Sea Eagles 27–8. The next week, the Bulldogs returned once again to Monday Night Football for their round sixteen clash with the struggling Sydney Roosters. Without their Origin stars, it was a dominant display from Sonny Bill Williams that led the 'Dogs to a 38–6 dismantling of the Roosters in front of a big crowd of 20,722.

Now sitting on 10th spot, the Bulldogs had a chance to jump into the Top 8 against the Cronulla Sharks at Toyota Park. Down 12–0 at halftime, a good comeback saw the Bulldogs prevail 14–12 for their 3rd straight win. The next week, however, saw the Bulldogs suffer a loss against bottom-placed Penrith Panthers at Telstra Stadium, in front of just 12,465 fans. In control of the match for the first half, the Bulldogs conceded 26 points in the second half, losing 30–20. They were lucky to be sitting on 8th spot after round eighteen.

For round nineteen, the 'Dogs travelled to Carrara Stadium to face the Titans. It was a great performance from the Bulldogs as they streaked to a 36–12 thrashing against the Titans.

Round twenty and the Bulldogs took on the St George Illawarra Dragons at WIN Stadium. In front of 19,051 fans, the Bulldogs scored late in the game to score an upset, winning 28–24. This was the 'Dogs 10th win of the season, with their position in the Top 8 secured for another week.

Another Friday Night blockbuster was played in front of 27,201 fans where the Bulldogs hosted the Parramatta Eels at Telstra Stadium. Parramatta dominated the first half, leading 18–10 at the break, but during the second half the 'Dogs rallied for yet another comeback, scoring 2 tries to make the scoreline 28–22 with 10 minutes to go. As another try-scoring opportunity passed, Sonny Bill Williams looked to have scored off another one-on-one strip, but was ruled to have knocked it forward. In the end, the Bulldogs lost 34–22.

With a chance to cement their spot in the Top 8, the Bulldogs played against the Canberra Raiders at Telstra Stadium. Another superb performance from Sonny Bill Williams, including a first career hat-trick, saw the Bulldogs effectively end the Raiders' finals hopes with a crushing 52–4 win, their biggest win over the Raiders in history. Hazem El Masri kicked only 6 goals from 10, but during the game scored a try to take his career tally to 2000 points. He ended the day on 2010 points, only 166 points from Andrew Johns' record.

The Bulldogs began their final three games (all to be played on Friday nights through Rounds 23, 24 and 25) with a one-point victory against the Brisbane Broncos by 25–24. The game 'see-sawed' considerably before a Brent Sherwin field goal managed to put the Bulldogs in front by one with 5 minutes remaining. The victory saw them temporarily third, but other results meant they kept their position in the top four and secured a likely finals berth.

The Bulldogs now have 2 matches left, first against the Melbourne Storm at Telstra Stadium, and then will conclude their regular season against the North Queensland Cowboys at Dairy Farmers Stadium on 31 August. With these two matches remaining, the Bulldogs are currently positioned in the top four.

== Match results ==
2007 Season Results
| Round | Opponent | Result | Bulldogs | Opposition | Date | Venue | Crowd |
|---|---|---|---|---|---|---|---|
| TM | St George Illawarra Dragons | Win | 26 | 16 | 24 February | WIN Stadium | – |
| TM | New Zealand Warriors | Loss | 6 | 36 | 3 March | North Harbour Stadium | – |
| 1 | Newcastle Knights | Loss | 24 | 25 | 18 March | Energy Australia Stadium | 18,791 |
| 2 | Penrith Panthers | Loss | 10 | 40 | 23 March | CUA Stadium | 16,652 |
| 3 | Gold Coast Titans | Win | 22 | 6 | 1 April | Telstra Stadium | 14,675 |
| 4 | South Sydney Rabbitohs | Win | 34 | 10 | 6 April | Telstra Stadium | 34,315 |
| 5 | Manly Sea Eagles | Loss | 14 | 16 | 14 April | Telstra Stadium | 20,269 |
| 6 | Parramatta Eels | Win | 21 | 18 | 22 April | Parramatta Stadium | 18,285 |
| 7 | Wests Tigers | Loss | 18 | 34 | 27 April | Telstra Stadium | 18,066 |
| 8 | Newcastle Knights | Win | 30 | 16 | 6 May | Telstra Stadium | 12,654 |
| 9 | Melbourne Storm | Loss | 14 | 38 | 14 May | Olympic Park | 14,066 |
| 10 | Cronulla Sharks | Loss | 20 | 30 | 20 May | Telstra Stadium | 12,384 |
| 11 | North Queensland Cowboys | Loss | 16 | 26 | 25 May | Suncorp Stadium | 15,412 |
| 12 | New Zealand Warriors | Win | 40 | 20 | 3 June | Mount Smart Stadium | 10,041 |
| 13 | Bye | | | | | | |
| 14 | Brisbane Broncos | Loss | 12 | 19 | 15 June | Telstra Stadium | 10,121 |
| 15 | Manly Sea Eagles | Win | 27 | 8 | 22 June | Brookvale Oval | 13,849 |
| 16 | Sydney Roosters | Win | 38 | 6 | 2 July | Telstra Stadium | 20,722 |
| 17 | Cronulla Sharks | Win | 14 | 12 | 8 July | Toyota Park | 8,441 |
| 18 | Penrith Panthers | Loss | 20 | 30 | 14 July | Telstra Stadium | 12,465 |
| 19 | Gold Coast Titans | Win | 36 | 12 | 20 July | Carrara Stadium | 15,873 |
| 20 | St George Illawarra Dragons | Win | 28 | 24 | 28 July | WIN Stadium | 19,051 |
| 21 | Parramatta Eels | Loss | 22 | 34 | 3 August | Telstra Stadium | 27,201 |
| 22 | Canberra Raiders | Win | 52 | 4 | 12 August | Telstra Stadium | 12,127 |
| 23 | Brisbane Broncos | Win | 25 | 24 | 17 August | Suncorp Stadium | 35,199 |
| 24 | Melbourne Storm | Loss | 6 | 38 | 24 August | Telstra Stadium | |
| 25 | North Queensland Cowboys | Loss | 32 | 38 | 31 August | Dairy Farmers Stadium | |
| Qualifying Final | North Queensland Cowboys | Loss | 18 | 20 | 8 September | Dairy Farmers Stadium | |
| Semi Final | Parramatta Eels | Loss | 6 | 25 | 15 September | Telstra Stadium | |

| Round | Position |
|---|---|
| 1 | 9/16 |
| 2 | 13/16 |
| 3 | 11/16 |
| 4 | 7/16 |
| 5 | 10/16 |
| 6 | 7/16 |
| 7 | 10/16 |
| 8 | 8/16 |
| 9 | 11/16 |
| 10 | 11/16 |
| 11 | 14/16 |
| 12 | 11/16 |
| 13 | 11/16 |
| 14 | 13/16 |
| 15 | 11/16 |
| 16 | 10/16 |
| 17 | 7/16 |
| 18 | 8/16 |
| 19 | 7/16 |
| 20 | 6/16 |
| 21 | 7/16 |
| 22 | 6/16 |
| 23 | 4/16 |
| 24 | 4/16 |
| 25 | 6/16 |

== Ladder ==
2007 NRL season
| Pos | Team | Pld | W | D | L | B | PF | PA | PD | Pts |
|---|---|---|---|---|---|---|---|---|---|---|
| 1 | Melbourne Storm | 24 | 21 | 0 | 3 | 1 | 627 | 277 | +350 | 44 |
| 2 | Manly-Warringah Sea Eagles | 24 | 18 | 0 | 6 | 1 | 597 | 377 | +220 | 38 |
| 3 | North Queensland Cowboys | 24 | 15 | 0 | 9 | 1 | 547 | 618 | −71 | 32 |
| 4 | New Zealand Warriors | 24 | 13 | 1 | 10 | 1 | 593 | 434 | +159 | 29 |
| 5 | Parramatta Eels | 24 | 13 | 0 | 11 | 1 | 573 | 481 | +92 | 28 |
| 6 | Canterbury-Bankstown Bulldogs | 24 | 12 | 0 | 12 | 1 | 575 | 528 | +47 | 26 |
| 7 | South Sydney Rabbitohs | 24 | 12 | 0 | 12 | 1 | 408 | 399 | +9 | 26 |
| 8 | Brisbane Broncos | 24 | 11 | 0 | 13 | 1 | 511 | 476 | +35 | 24 |
| 9 | Wests Tigers | 24 | 11 | 0 | 13 | 1 | 541 | 561 | −20 | 24 |
| 10 | Sydney Roosters | 24 | 10 | 1 | 13 | 1 | 445 | 610 | −165 | 23 |
| 11 | Cronulla-Sutherland Sharks | 24 | 10 | 0 | 14 | 1 | 463 | 403 | +60 | 22 |
| 12 | Gold Coast Titans | 24 | 10 | 0 | 14 | 1 | 409 | 559 | −150 | 22 |
| 13 | St George Illawarra Dragons | 24 | 9 | 0 | 15 | 1 | 431 | 509 | −78 | 20 |
| 14 | Canberra Raiders | 24 | 9 | 0 | 15 | 1 | 522 | 652 | −130 | 20 |
| 15 | Newcastle Knights | 24 | 9 | 0 | 15 | 1 | 418 | 708 | −290 | 20 |
| 16 | Penrith Panthers | 24 | 8 | 0 | 16 | 1 | 539 | 607 | −68 | 18 |

== Players (31) ==
Current to Round 17, 2007
| Player | Appearances | Tries | Goals | F Goals | Points |
|---|---|---|---|---|---|
| Adam Brideson | 1 | 0 | 0 | 0 | 0 |
| Fred Briggs | 1 | 0 | 0 | 0 | 0 |
| Kane Cleal | 15 | 2 | 0 | 0 | 8 |
| Trent Cutler | 9 | 6 | 0 | 0 | 24 |
| Hazem El Masri | 15 | 6 | 51/60 | 0 | 126 |
| Andrew Emelio | 2 | 1 | 0 | 0 | 4 |
| Jon Green | 2 | 0 | 0 | 0 | 0 |
| Jarrad Hickey | 15 | 4 | 0 | 0 | 16 |
| Daniel Holdsworth | 11 | 0 | 0 | 1 | 1 |
| Corey Hughes | 15 | 1 | 0 | 0 | 4 |
| Nick Kouparitsas | 8 | 1 | 0 | 0 | 4 |
| Heka Nanai | 1 | 0 | 0 | 0 | 0 |
| Reni Maitua | 15 | 4 | 0 | 0 | 16 |
| Willie Mason | 11 | 2 | 0 | 0 | 8 |
| Dallas Mcilwain | 7 | 1 | 0 | 0 | 4 |
| Daryl Millard | 15 | 5 | 0 | 0 | 20 |
| Brad Morrin | 1 | 0 | 0 | 0 | 0 |
| Mark O'Meley | 11 | 1 | 0 | 0 | 4 |
| Luke Patten | 16 | 3 | 0 | 0 | 12 |
| Adam Perry | 10 | 0 | 0 | 0 | 0 |
| Cameron Phelps | 5 | 3 | 0 | 0 | 12 |
| Ben Roberts | 10 | 1 | 0 | 1 | 5 |
| Andrew Ryan | 14 | 4 | 0 | 0 | 16 |
| Brent Sherwin | 11 | 2 | 5/7 | 0 | 18 |
| Lee Te Maari | 6 | 1 | 0 | 0 | 4 |
| Willie Tonga | 15 | 3 | 0 | 0 | 12 |
| Matt Utai | 1 | 1 | 0 | 0 | 4 |
| Aaron Wheatley | 1 | 0 | 0 | 0 | 0 |
| Sonny Bill Williams | 14 | 8 | 0 | 0 | 32 |
| Tim Winitana | 1 | 0 | 0 | 0 | 0 |

=== Movements ===
Gains

2007 Signings/Transfers
| Player | Previous club | Years signed | Until the end of |
|---|---|---|---|
| Daryl Millard | St George Illawarra Dragons | 3 Years | 2009 |
| Kane Cleal | South Sydney Rabbitohs | 2 Years | 2008 |
| Brent Crisp | Canberra Raiders | 2 Years | 2008 |
| Lee Te Maari | St George Illawarra Dragons | 2 Years | 2008 |
| Aaron Wheatley | St George Illawarra Dragons | 1 Years | 2007 |
| Ryan Millard | St George Illawarra Dragons | Unknown duration | Unknown Year |
| Leon Bott | Cronulla Sharks | 2 Years | 2008 |

Losses

Losses
| Player | Notes |
|---|---|
| Roy Asotasi | Contract with the South Sydney Rabbitohs |
| Daniel Irvine | Contract with the South Sydney Rabbitohs |
| Nate Myles | Contract with the Sydney Roosters |
| Ben Czislowski | Contract with the Wynnum Manly |
| Daniel Conn | Contract with the Gold Coast Titans |

Re-Signings

Re-Signings
| Player | Years signed | Until the end of |
|---|---|---|
| Hazem El Masri | 2 Years | 2009 |
| Matt Utai | 2 Years | 2009 |
| Ben Roberts | 2 Years | 2009 |
| Cameron Phelps | 1 Year | 2008 |
| Corey Hughes | 1 Year | 2008 |
| Brad Morrin | 1 Year | 2008 |

== See also ==
- List of Canterbury-Bankstown Bulldogs seasons
