= 2007 Sydney Roosters season =

- NRL rank: 10th
- 2007 record: Wins: 10; draws: 1; losses: 13
- Points scored: For: 445 (78tries, 65goals, 3fieldgoals);

Team information
- Coach: Chris Anderson, Brad Fittler
- Captain: Craig Fitzgibbon
- Stadium: Sydney Football Stadium
- Avg. attendance: 12,014

Top scorers
- Tries: Joel Monaghan 14
- Goals: Craig Fitzgibbon 57
- Points: Craig Fitzgibbon 122
← 2006	2008 →

The 2007 Sydney Roosters season was the 100th in the club's history. They competed in the NRL's 2007 Telstra Premiership and finished 10th (out of 16).

== Season summary ==
The Sydney Roosters had a relatively poor start to their 100th season, not recording a win until Round 7 against the St George-Illawarra Dragons on Anzac Day. This however was juxtaposed by a rather strong period in the middle of the year winning 5 of their last 8 matches between Rounds 7 and 14.

Despite their poor start to the season, the Sydney Roosters were having a late season resurgence under newly appointed Care-Taker Coach Brad Fittler. Since Chris Anderson left the club following their 56–0 loss to Manly Sea Eagles, the Sydney Roosters were yet to lose a game in 5 consecutive matches and were a few days ago, in 10th position. That came from wins over the likes of the Cronulla Sharks, Newcastle Knights, Melbourne Storm and Wests Tigers with a draw to the New Zealand Warriors. Then on 19 August, the run of being undefeated by Brad Fittler was broken, as the Gold Coast Titans claimed victory 22–18. This sits the Sydney Roosters on 11th, still a mathematical chance of making the finals.

== Ladder ==
2007 NRL season
Pos	Team	Pld	W	D	L	B	PF	PA	PD	Pts
1	Melbourne Storm	24	21	0	3	1	627	277	+350	44
2	Manly-Warringah Sea Eagles	24	18	0	6	1	597	377	+220	38
3	North Queensland Cowboys	24	15	0	9	1	547	618	−71	32
4	New Zealand Warriors	24	13	1	10	1	593	434	+159	29
5	Parramatta Eels	24	13	0	11	1	573	481	+92	28
6	Canterbury-Bankstown Bulldogs	24	12	0	12	1	575	528	+47	26
7	South Sydney Rabbitohs	24	12	0	12	1	408	399	+9	26
8	Brisbane Broncos	24	11	0	13	1	511	476	+35	24
9	Wests Tigers	24	11	0	13	1	541	561	−20	24
10	Sydney Roosters	24	10	1	13	1	445	610	−165	23
11	Cronulla-Sutherland Sharks	24	10	0	14	1	463	403	+60	22
12	Gold Coast Titans	24	10	0	14	1	409	559	−150	22
13	St George Illawarra Dragons	24	9	0	15	1	431	509	−78	20
14	Canberra Raiders	24	9	0	15	1	522	652	−130	20
15	Newcastle Knights	24	9	0	15	1	418	708	−290	20
16	Penrith Panthers	24	8	0	16	1	539	607	−68	18

== Results ==
Round	Opponent	Result	Syd	Opp.	Date	Venue	Crowd	Report
1	South Sydney Rabbitohs	Loss	6	18	19 Mar	Sydney Football Stadium	24,127	
2	North Queensland Cowboys	Loss	6	43	24 Mar	Willows Sports Complex	21,396	
3	Manly Warringah Sea Eagles	Loss	8	30	1 Apr	Sydney Football Stadium	11,976	
4	Brisbane Broncos	Loss	10	32	6 Apr	Sydney Football Stadium	11,476	
5	Canberra Raiders	Loss	28	37	16 Apr	Canberra Stadium	15,862	
6	Bye							
7	St George-Illawarra Dragons	Win	18	4	25 Apr	Sydney Football Stadium	18,240	
8	Parramatta Eels	Loss	10	28	5 May	Parramatta Stadium	13,021	
9	Gold Coast Titans	Win	24	18	13 May	Sydney Football Stadium	6,242	
10	Melbourne Storm	Loss	2	26	19 May	Sydney Olympic Park	9,354	
11	Cronulla Sharks	Win	13	12	26 May	Endeavour Field	11,193	
12	Newcastle Knights	Loss	18	22	2 Jun	Central Coast Stadium	11,264	
13	North Queensland Cowboys	Win	64	30	9 Jun	Sydney Football Stadium	4,168	
14	Penrith Panthers	Win	24	20	16 Jun	Penrith Stadium	5,831	
15	Parramatta Eels	Loss	16	36	23 Jun	Sydney Football Stadium	12,211	
16	Canterbury-Bankstown Bulldogs	Loss	6	38	2 Jul	Stadium Australia	20,722	
17	Manly Warringah Sea Eagles	Loss	0	56	7 Jul	Brookvale Oval	9,932	
18	Cronulla Sharks	Win	23	12	14 Jul	Sydney Football Stadium	8,421	
19	Newcastle Knights	Win	20	17	21 Jul	Newcastle International Sports Centre	15,171	
20	Melbourne Storm	Win	26	16	27 Jul	Sydney Football Stadium	8,824	
21	New Zealand Warriors	Draw	31	31	5 Aug	Sydney Football Stadium	15,142	
22	Wests Tigers	Win	26	22	10 Aug	Stadium Australia	25,166	
23	Gold Coast Titans	Loss	18	22	19 Aug	Carrara Stadium	17,425	
24	Penrith Panthers	Loss	22	28	25 August	Sydney Football Stadium		
25	South Sydney Rabbitohs	Win	26	12	1 September	Stadium Australia		

== Notable events ==
- Sydney Roosters celebrate their 100th year in the competition
- In round 7 the Roosters defeated the St George Illawarra Dragons 18–4. This victory marked the 1,000th win in the club's history. The Roosters were the first club to achieve this feat.
- The Roosters scored an unprecedented 64 points in round 13 against the Cowboys. This was the third highest number of points scored in a single game by the Roosters.
- In the Roosters round 14 victory over the Penrith Panthers, the Sydney Roosters recorded their first back to back win since 2005.
- The Roosters 56-point thrashing by Manly was their second worst defeat by Manly, and the Roosters seventh worst loss of all time. Following this loss, Chris Anderson resigned as coach with club legend Brad Fittler named as coach for the rest of the season.
- On 14 July the Sydney Roosters defeated the Cronulla Sharks 23–12. This result after a restless week at the Roosters marked Brad Fittler's first win as a first grade coach.
- With the round 20 victory over the competition leaders and premiership favourites, the Melbourne Storm (26–16), the Sydney Roosters recorded their first three consecutive wins since the finals series in 2004, a run which was halted by the Grand Final loss to the Canterbury Bulldogs.
- In round 22, the Roosters became the first team in NRL history to go to Golden Point extra-time for two consecutive matches. They went on to win the match with a Joel Monaghan try.
- In round 23, Brad Fittler tasted defeat for the first time in his coaching career, a loss to the Gold Coast Titans, 22–18.
- On 28 August 2007, caretaker head coach Brad Fittler AM was appointed as the head coach for season 2008 (101st season for the Sydney Roosters).

== Wins ==
- Round 07, Sydney Roosters 18 defeated St George Illawarra Dragons 4 at Sydney Football Stadium
- Round 09, Sydney Roosters 24 defeated Gold Coast Titans 18 at Sydney Football Stadium
- Round 11, Sydney Roosters 13 defeated Cronulla Sharks 12 at Toyota Park
- Round 13, Sydney Roosters 64 defeated North Queensland Cowboys 30 at Sydney Football Stadium
- Round 14, Sydney Roosters 24 defeated Penrith Panthers 20 at CUA Stadium
- Round 18, Sydney Roosters 23 defeated Cronulla Sharks 12 at Sydney Football Stadium
- Round 19, Sydney Roosters 20 defeated Newcastle Knights 17 at Energy Australia Stadium
- Round 20, Sydney Roosters 26 defeated Melbourne Storm 16 at Sydney Football Stadium
- Round 22, Sydney Roosters 26 defeated Wests Tigers 22 at Telstra Stadium

== Draws ==
- Round 21, Sydney Roosters 31 drew with the New Zealand Warriors at the Sydney Football Stadium

== Players ==
The following is the Sydney Roosters squad named for the 2007 season. For Player Contracts see below in the external links section for details.

No.

Position
Player

989 Craig Fitzgibbon – SR (c) 990 Craig Wing – HK 994 Anthony Minichiello – FB 995 Chris Flannery – SR 1033 Lopini Paea – SR 1035 Anthony Tupou – SR 1038 Heath L'Estrange – HK 1040 Sam Perrett – WG 1044 Joel Monaghan – WG 1045 Nigel Plum – SR 1046 Amos Roberts – WG 1047 Iosia Soliola – CE 1049 Jamie Soward – FE #

No.

Position
Player

1052 Mickey Paea – SR 1053 David Shillington – PR 1055 Braith Anasta – FE 1056 Ashley Harrison – LK (vc) 1057 Charlie Tonga – PR 1060 Vince Mellars – CE 1068 Chris Beattie – PR 1070 Nate Myles – SR 1071 Danny Nutley – PR 1072 Mitchell Pearce – HB John Williams – WG

1. Jamie Soward as of 28 May has left the Sydney Roosters. He is now a member of the St George Illawarra Dragons.
2. Josh Lewis as of 14 May gained a release from the Sydney Roosters and with immediate effect will play for the Gold Coast Titans
3. Nigel Plum as of 5 June sought and was granted a release from the Sydney Roosters and has immediately signed with the Canberra Raiders.
4. Chris Flannery as of 15 June has been granted a release from the Sydney Roosters. Flannery, a seasoned origin player for Queensland has since signed with St. Helens in the Super League.

== Player Summary ==
Sydney Roosters 2007	Appearance	Interchange	Tries	Goals	F/G	Points
Braith Anasta	19	–	5	–	2	22
Mitchell Aubusson	10	7	3	–	–	12
Chris Beattie	1	5	–	–	–	0
Willie Brown	–	2	–	–	–	0
Craig Fitzgibbon	23	–	2	57	–	122
Ashley Harrison	13	7	4	–	–	16
Shaun Kenny-Dowall	14	–	8	–	–	32
Heath L'Estrange	6	2	–	–	–	0
Josh Lewis	1	–	1	–	–	4
Anthony Minichiello	10	–	2	–	1	9
Joel Monaghan	20	–	14	–	–	56
Nate Myles	7	8	–	–	–	0
Danny Nutley	17	7	–	–	–	0
Frank-Paul Nuuausala	1	2	–	–	–	0
Lopini Paea	7	15	3	–	–	12
Mickey Paea	–	5	–	–	–	0
Mitchell Pearce	13	3	2	–	–	8
Sam Perrett	24	–	9	–	–	36
Nigel Plum	1	3	–	–	–	0
Amos Roberts	20	1	7	8	–	44
Setaimata Sa	7	7	1	–	–	4
Shane Shackleton	6	14	1	–	–	4
David Shillington	21	–	1	–	–	4
Iosia Soliola	13	–	1	–	–	4
Jamie Soward	1	–	–	–	–	0
Charlie Tonga	–	2	–	–	–	0
Anthony Tupou	21	1	4	–	–	16
Danny Williams	–	5	–	–	–	0
John Williams	12	–	5	–	–	20
Craig Wing	24	–	5	–	–	20
Total	312	96	78	65	3	445

== Player Movements ==
=== Incoming ===
Name	Club Coming From	Details
Mark O'Meley	Bulldogs	4-year contract, begins 2008
James Aubusson	Melbourne Storm	3-year contract, begins 2008
Willie Mason	Bulldogs	3-year contract, begins 2008

=== Outgoing ===
Name	Club Going To	Details
Craig Wing	South Sydney Rabbitohs	4-year contract, begins 2008
Joel Monaghan	Canberra Raiders	3-year contract, begins 2008
Jamie Soward	St George-Illawarra Dragons	2-year contract, effective immediately
Josh Lewis	Gold Coast Titans	3-year contract, effective immediately
Nigel Plum	Canberra Raiders	2-year contract, effective immediately
Chris Flannery	St Helens R.F.C.	4-year contract, effective immediately
Heath L'Estrange	Manly Warringah Sea Eagles	2-year Contract begins 2008

== Representative Players ==
The following is a list of Sydney Rooster players who have played for Australia or New Zealand and other nations, New South Wales or Queensland and City or Country in representative levels of football during the 2007 calendar year. This is correct as of 15 May 2007

=== International ===
Australia

- Anthony Tupou

New Zealand

- Iosia Soliola

=== State of Origin ===
New South Wales

- Anthony Minichiello
- Braith Anasta
- Anthony Tupou

Queensland

- Nate Myles

=== City Vs Country ===
City

- Anthony Minichiello
- Braith Anasta
- Craig Wing

Country

- Amos Roberts
- Craig Fitzgibbon

== Staff ==
=== Coaching staff ===
Head coach – Brad Fittler AM (10 July 2007 – )
Head coach – Chris Anderson (16 March 2007 – 9 July 2007)
Physical Performance Manager – Ronald Palmer
Strength and Conditioning coach – Richard Harris
Strength and Conditioning coach – Ben Gardiner
Jersey Flegg and NRL Assistant coach – James Pickering
Club Physotherapist – Tony Ayoub
Football Manager – Troy Rovelli
Team doctor – Dr John Orchid
Recruitment and Retention – Arthur Beetson OAM

=== Assistant Staff/ Consultants ===
Luke Phillips
Luke Ricketson
Adrian Lam
Phil Gould

=== Executive ===
CEO – Brian Canavan
Chairman – Nick Politis

List incomplete
