= 2007 Canberra Raiders season =

- 2007 NRL season Rank: 14th
- Play-off result: Did not qualify
- record: Wins: 9; draws: 0; losses: 15
- Points scored: For: 522; against: 650

Team information
- Coach: Neil Henry
- Captain: Alan Tongue
- Stadium: Canberra Stadium
- Avg. attendance: 11,512
- High attendance: 15,862

Top scorers
- Tries: Todd Carney (12)
- Goals: Michael Dobson (56)
- Points: Michael Dobson (124)
← 2006	List of seasons	2008 →

The 2007 Canberra Raiders season was the 26th in the club's history. They competed in the NRL's 2007 Telstra Premiership, finishing the regular season 14th (out of 16).

== Pre-season ==
The Raiders' first trial match was against a highly understrength Brisbane Broncos team, with the top side in England playing their World Club Challenge match as premiers. However, the Raiders lost this game, resulting in widespread criticism and the team's entrenchment as wooden spoon favourites. Despite bouncing back against Wests Tigers in their second match, the Raiders were unable to put paid to these predictions, largely due to the side's lack of experience at both first grade and representative level.

== Regular season ==
The Raiders' first NRL match of the season started inauspiciously, with a 32–6 loss to the Manly Sea Eagles. Their first win was in the third round, a convincing 48–18 win over the Newcastle Knights. The team registered consecutive wins for the only time in Round 11 against the Dragons, and entered the top 8 for the first time in Round 13. However, this win was followed by four straight losses, and the Raiders were unable to find any consistency before the season finished.

This season was notable for the Raiders' struggles away from home – just two of their nine wins occurred away from Canberra Stadium.

=== Results ===
Trial Games
Round	Opponent	Result	Can.	Opp.	Date	Venue	Crowd	Position
Trial Match	Brisbane Broncos	Loss	12	18	24 Feb	Dolphin Park		
Trial Match	Wests Tigers	Win	26	4	3 Mar	Davies Park		
NRL Regular Season Games
1	Manly Sea Eagles	Loss	6	32	17 Mar	Brookvale Oval	13,533	16/16
2	Melbourne Storm	Loss	16	32	24 Mar	Canberra Stadium	9,556	15/16
3	Newcastle Knights	Win	48	18	30 Mar	Canberra Stadium	13,109	10/16
4	Parramatta Eels	Loss	6	38	7 Apr	Parramatta Stadium	10,091	14/16
5	Sydney Roosters	Win	37	28	16 Apr	Canberra Stadium	15,862	12/16
6	Cronulla Sharks	Loss	0	26	21 Apr	Toyota Park	9,289	15/16
7	Penrith Panthers	Win	34	18	28 Apr	CUA Stadium	8,494	12/16
8	Manly Sea Eagles	Loss	30	46	6 May	Canberra Stadium	14,387	14/16
9	South Sydney Rabbitohs	Win	16	10	12 May	Telstra Stadium	11,088	12/16
10	BYE							10/16
11	St George Illawarra Dragons	Win	30	6	25 May	Canberra Stadium	13,187	7/16
12	Gold Coast Titans	Loss	8	28	3 Jun	Carrara Stadium	13,642	9/16
13	Parramatta Eels	Win	38	10	9 Jun	Canberra Stadium	11,232	8/16
14	Newcastle Knights	Loss	18	22	18 Jun	EnergyAustralia Stadium	11,349	9/16
15	North Queensland Cowboys	Loss	24	28	23 Jun	Canberra Stadium	11,263	13/16
16	Wests Tigers	Loss	22	16	1 Jul	Canberra Stadium	12,598	13/16
17	St George Illawarra Dragons	Loss	16	58	8 Jul	WIN Stadium	7,561	14/16
18	Gold Coast Titans	Win	56	10	15 Jul	Canberra Stadium		13/16
19	Melbourne Storm	Loss	6	34	21 Jul	Olympic Park	8,983	13/16
20	Penrith Panthers	Win	34	30	27 Jul	Canberra Stadium		10/16
22	Canterbury Bulldogs	Loss	4	52	12 Aug	Telstra Stadium		14/16
23	New Zealand Warriors	Win	26	24	18 Aug	Canberra Stadium	8,134	12/16
24	Brisbane Broncos	Loss	19	30	26 Aug	Suncorp Stadium		14/16
25	Cronulla Sharks	Loss	12	22	1 Sep	Canberra Stadium		14/16

Colour	Result
Green	Win
Red	Loss
Yellow	Golden point Win
Blue	Bye

=== Ladder ===
2007 NRL season
Pos	Team	Pld	W	D	L	B	PF	PA	PD	Pts
1	Melbourne Storm	24	21	0	3	1	627	277	+350	44
2	Manly-Warringah Sea Eagles	24	18	0	6	1	597	377	+220	38
3	North Queensland Cowboys	24	15	0	9	1	547	618	−71	32
4	New Zealand Warriors	24	13	1	10	1	593	434	+159	29
5	Parramatta Eels	24	13	0	11	1	573	481	+92	28
6	Canterbury-Bankstown Bulldogs	24	12	0	12	1	575	528	+47	26
7	South Sydney Rabbitohs	24	12	0	12	1	408	399	+9	26
8	Brisbane Broncos	24	11	0	13	1	511	476	+35	24
9	Wests Tigers	24	11	0	13	1	541	561	−20	24
10	Sydney Roosters	24	10	1	13	1	445	610	−165	23
11	Cronulla-Sutherland Sharks	24	10	0	14	1	463	403	+60	22
12	Gold Coast Titans	24	10	0	14	1	409	559	−150	22
13	St George Illawarra Dragons	24	9	0	15	1	431	509	−78	20
14	Canberra Raiders	24	9	0	15	1	522	652	−130	20
15	Newcastle Knights	24	9	0	15	1	418	708	−290	20
16	Penrith Panthers	24	8	0	16	1	539	607	−68	18

== Club Awards ==
Award	Winner
Player of the Year	Scott Logan
Coaches Award	Josh Miller
Rookie of the Year	Joe Picker
Fred Daly Memorial Clubman of the Year Trophy	Brett Dickson
Premier League Player of the Year	Ryan Hinchcliffe
Premier League Coaches Award	Cy Lasscock
Jersey Flegg Player of the Year	Nick Skinner
Jersey Flegg Coaches Award	Shaun Fensom

== Squad ==
- Colin Best
- Matt Bickerstaff
- Todd Carney
- Marshall Chalk
- Neville Costigan
- Michael Dobson
- Andrew Dunemann
- Phil Graham
- Bronx Goodwin
- David Howell
- Steve Irwin (released mid-season)
- Ben Jones
- Brett Kelly
- Tom Learoyd-Lahrs
- Scott Logan
- Josh Miller
- David Milne
- Adrian Purtell
- Nigel Plum (signed mid-season)
- Willie Raston
- Alan Rothery
- Troy Thompson
- Trevor Thurling
- Dane Tilse
- Alan Tongue
- Glen Turner
- Michael Weyman
- Jason Williams
- William Zillman
- Lincoln Withers
