= 2007 New Zealand Warriors season =

- NRL rank: 4th
- 2007 record: Wins: 13; draws: 1; losses: 10
- Points scored: For: 593; against: 434

Team information
- CEO: Wayne Scurrah
- Coach: Ivan Cleary
- Assistant coach: John Ackland
- Captains: Steve Price; Ruben Wiki
- Stadium: Mt Smart Stadium
- Avg. attendance: 14,419

Top scorers
- Tries: Jerome Ropati (10); Grant Rovelli (10); Manu Vatuvei (10)
- Goals: Michael Witt (62)
- Points: Michael Witt (153)
← 2006	2008 →

The New Zealand Warriors 2007 season was the New Zealand Warriors 13th first-grade season. The club competed in Australasia's National Rugby League. The coach of the team was Ivan Cleary while Steve Price was the club's captain.

== Milestones ==
- 25 March - Round 2: Evarn Tuimavave made his 50th appearance for the club.
- 8 April - Round 4: Logan Swann became the third player to play 150 first grade games for the Warriors.
- 5 May - Round 8: Nathan Fien made his 50th appearance for the club.
- 20 May - Round 10: Ruben Wiki made his 50th appearance for the club.
- 3 June - Round 12: Tony Martin made his 50th appearance for the club.
- 7 July - Round 17: Manu Vatuvei and Steve Price made their 50th appearances for the club.
- 26 August - Round 24: Wairangi Koopu made his 150th appearance for the club and Epalahame Lauaki made his 50th appearance for the club.
- 16 September - Semi Final: Micheal Luck and Simon Mannering made their 50th appearances for the club.

== Jersey and sponsors ==

The Warriors did not change their home jersey from 2006, sticking with the predominantly Black & White design supplied by Puma AG. The away jersey also remained unchanged, being mainly Grey with Black details. Sponsored by Lion Red and Vodafone

== Fixtures ==
The Warriors used Mt Smart Stadium as their home ground in 2007, their only home ground since they entered the competition in 1995.

=== Trial Matches ===
Date	Round	Opponent	Venue	Result	Score	Tries	Goals	Attendance	Report
18 February	Trial 1	Auckland Lions	Mt Smart Stadium No 2, Auckland	Win	64–4	Hohaia (3), Byrne 2, Martin, Lawrie, Vuna, Witt, Gatis, Packer, Crockett	Witt (5), Martin (3)	5,000	
24 February	Trial 2	North Queensland Cowboys	Leprechaun Park, Mackay	Loss	14–32	Vatuvei, McKinnon, Lauaki	Martin (1)	8,000	
3 March	Trial 3	Bulldogs	North Harbour Stadium, Auckland	Win	36–6	Vatuvei, Crockett, Swann, Fien, McKinnon, Byrne	Martin (6)	15,122	

=== Regular season ===
Date	Round	Opponent	Venue	Result	Score	Tries	Goals	Attendance	Report
17 March	Round 1	Parramatta Eels	Mt Smart Stadium, Auckland	Win	34–18	Crockett (2), Hohaia, Mannering, McKinnon, Price	Martin (5)	13,587	
25 March	Round 2	Brisbane Broncos	Mt Smart Stadium, Auckland	Win	24–14	Crockett (2), Price, Witt	Martin (4)	16,738	
1 April	Round 3	Melbourne Storm	Olympic Park, Melbourne	Loss	12–30	Rapira, Vatuvei	Martin (2)	12,874	
8 April	Round 4	Manly Sea Eagles	Brookvale Oval, Sydney	Loss	10–13	Mannering, Martin	Martin (1)	16,358	
15 April	Round 5	North Queensland Cowboys	Mt Smart Stadium, Auckland	Win	34–14	Byrne, Fien, Price, Rovelli, Vatuvei, Witt	Martin (5)	11,260	
	Round 6	Bye			-				
29 April	Round 7	South Sydney Rabbitohs	Telstra Stadium, Sydney	Win	18–16	Byrne, McKinnon, Rovelli	Martin (3)	13,044	
5 May	Round 8	Cronulla Sharks	Mt Smart Stadium, Auckland	Loss	20–22	Anderson, Rapira, Witt	Martin (4)	13,587	
12 May	Round 9	Newcastle Knights	EnergyAustralia Stadium, Newcastle	Loss	18–24	Fien, Ropati, Wiki	Hohaia (3)	15,107	
20 May	Round 10	Wests Tigers	Mt Smart Stadium, Auckland	Loss	26–30	Ah Van, Hohaia, Mannering, Ropati, Vatuvei	Martin (3)	10,282	
28 May	Round 11	Parramatta Eels	Parramatta Stadium, Sydney	Loss	6–30	Swann	Martin (1)	11,160	
3 June	Round 12	Bulldogs	Mt Smart Stadium, Auckland	Loss	20–40	Ah Van, Mannering, Ropati, Swann	Martin (2)	10,041	
10 June	Round 13	Melbourne Storm	Mt Smart Stadium, Auckland	Loss	2–4		Martin (1)	6,209	
16 June	Round 14	Cronulla Sharks	Toyota Park, Sydney	Win	12–2	Vatuvei, Witt	Witt (2)	4,202	
22 June	Round 15	Penrith Panthers	Mt Smart Stadium, Auckland	Win	54–14	McKinnon (2), Witt (2), Anderson, Gatis, Koopu, Lauaki, Vatuvei	Witt (6), Martin (3)	9,978	
30 June	Round 16	Gold Coast Titans	Gold Coast Stadium, Gold Coast	Win	22–6	Gatis, McKinnon, Rapira	Witt (5)	17,608	
7 July	Round 17	North Queensland Cowboys	Dairy Farmers Stadium, Townsville	Loss	12–18	Ah Van, Vatuvei	Witt (2)	19,648	
15 July	Round 18	St. George Illawarra Dragons	Mt Smart Stadium, Auckland	Win	44–16	Mannering (2), Crockett, Gatis, McKinnon, Ropati, Tuimavave	Witt (8)	10,037	
22 July	Round 19	Wests Tigers	Campbelltown Stadium, Sydney	Win	28–16	Rovelli (2), Koopu, Luck, Ropati	Witt (4)	14,012	
28 July	Round 20	Newcastle Knights	Mt Smart Stadium, Auckland	Win	52–10	McKinnon (2), Ropati (2), Rovelli (2), Koopu, Price, Vatuvei	Witt (8)	11,301	
5 August	Round 21	Sydney Roosters	SFS, Sydney	Draw (G.P.)	31–31	Lauaki (2), McKinnon, Ropati, Vatuvei	Witt (5 & FG)	15,124	
11 August	Round 22	Gold Coast Titans	Mt Smart Stadium, Auckland	Win	30–6	Rovelli (3), Ropati (2)	Witt (5)	20,609	
18 August	Round 23	Canberra Raiders	Canberra Stadium, Canberra	Loss	24–26	Crockett, Fien, Lauaki, Vatuvei	Witt (4)	8,134	
26 August	Round 24	Manly Sea Eagles	Mt Smart Stadium, Auckland	Win	36–14	Koopu (2), Gatis, Lauaki, Mannering, Vatuvei	Witt (6)	25,070	
1 September	Round 25	Penrith Panthers	CUA Stadium, Sydney	Win	24–20	Byrne (2), Rapira, Rovelli	Witt (4)	14,473	

=== Finals ===
Date	Round	Opponent	Venue	Result	Score	Tries	Goals	Attendance	Report
7 September	Qualifying Final	Parramatta Eels	Mt Smart Stadium, Auckland	Loss	10–12	Byrne, Witt	Witt (1)	28,745	
16 September	Semi Final	North Queensland Cowboys	Dairy Farmers Stadium, Townsville	Loss	12–49	Crockett, Martin	Witt (2)	21,847	

== Ladder ==
2007 NRL season
Pos	Team	Pld	W	D	L	B	PF	PA	PD	Pts
1	Melbourne Storm	24	21	0	3	1	627	277	+350	44
2	Manly-Warringah Sea Eagles	24	18	0	6	1	597	377	+220	38
3	North Queensland Cowboys	24	15	0	9	1	547	618	−71	32
4	New Zealand Warriors	24	13	1	10	1	593	434	+159	29
5	Parramatta Eels	24	13	0	11	1	573	481	+92	28
6	Canterbury-Bankstown Bulldogs	24	12	0	12	1	575	528	+47	26
7	South Sydney Rabbitohs	24	12	0	12	1	408	399	+9	26
8	Brisbane Broncos	24	11	0	13	1	511	476	+35	24
9	Wests Tigers	24	11	0	13	1	541	561	−20	24
10	Sydney Roosters	24	10	1	13	1	445	610	−165	23
11	Cronulla-Sutherland Sharks	24	10	0	14	1	463	403	+60	22
12	Gold Coast Titans	24	10	0	14	1	409	559	−150	22
13	St George Illawarra Dragons	24	9	0	15	1	431	509	−78	20
14	Canberra Raiders	24	9	0	15	1	522	652	−130	20
15	Newcastle Knights	24	9	0	15	1	418	708	−290	20
16	Penrith Panthers	24	8	0	16	1	539	607	−68	18

== Squad ==
Twenty three players were used by the club in 2007. Four players made their debuts for the club, although only one (Corey Lawrie) made his National Rugby League debut. In addition Aidan Kirk was in the squad but did not play a game due to injury.

No.	Name	Nationality	Position	Warriors debut	App	T	G	FG	Pts
42	Logan Swann	(New Zealand)	SR	1 March 1997	25	2	0	0	8
64	Wairangi Koopu	(New Zealand)	CE / SR	9 April 1999	17	5	0	0	20
99	Lance Hohaia	(New Zealand)	UB	6 April 2002	10	2	3	0	14
102	Evarn Tuimavave	(New Zealand)	PR	1 September 2002	25	1	0	0	4
108	Jerome Ropati	(New Zealand)	CE / FE	31 August 2003	12	10	0	0	40
109	Tony Martin	(Australia)	CE	14 March 2004	13	2	34	0	76
110	Epalahame Lauaki	(New Zealand) / (Tonga)	SR	14 March 2004	24	5	0	0	20
112	Louis Anderson	(New Zealand)	LK	28 March 2004	10	2	0	0	8
115	Manu Vatuvei	(New Zealand)	WG	23 May 2004	23	10	0	0	40
121	Steve Price	(Australia)	PR	13 March 2005	23	4	0	0	16
122	Todd Byrne	(Australia)	WG	13 March 2005	12	5	0	0	20
123	Ruben Wiki	(New Zealand)	PR	13 March 2005	22	1	0	0	4
124	Nathan Fien	(New Zealand)	HK	13 March 2005	26	3	0	0	12
125	Simon Mannering	(New Zealand)	CE	26 June 2005	26	7	0	0	28
126	Micheal Luck	(Australia)	SR	12 March 2006	26	1	0	0	4
127	Grant Rovelli	(Australia) / (Italy)	HB	12 March 2006	23	10	0	0	40
128	George Gatis	(Australia) / (Greece)	HK	25 March 2006	22	4	0	0	16
129	Patrick Ah Van	(New Zealand)	WG	9 April 2006	12	3	0	0	12
131	Sam Rapira	(New Zealand)	PR	20 May 2006	26	4	0	0	16
132	Wade McKinnon	(Australia)	FB	17 March 2007	22	9	0	0	36
133	Michael Crockett	(Australia)	WG	17 March 2007	14	7	0	0	28
134	Michael Witt	(Australia)	FE	17 March 2007	25	7	62	1	153
135	Corey Lawrie	(New Zealand)	LK	15 April 2007	4	0	0	0	0

== Staff ==
- Chief Executive Officer: Wayne Scurrah

=== NRL Staff ===
- Head coach: Ivan Cleary
- Assistant coach: John Ackland
- Welfare and Development Coach: Tony Iro
- In August 2007 Dean Bell was appointed the club's Development Manager with the intention that he would manage the Toyota Cup (Under-20s) team from 2008.
- Trainer: Craig Walker

== Transfers ==
=== Gains ===
Player	Previous club	Length	Notes
Wade McKinnon	Parramatta Eels		
Michael Crockett	Wests Tigers		
Michael Witt	Manly Sea Eagles		
Aidan Kirk	Sydney Roosters		

=== Losses ===
Player	Club	Notes
Awen Guttenbeil	Castleford Tigers	
Clinton Toopi	Leeds Rhinos	
Richard Villasanti	Cronulla Sharks	
Brent Webb	Leeds Rhinos	
Sione Faumuina	Harlequins RL	

=== Mid-Season Losses ===
Player	Club	Notes
Cooper Vuna	Newcastle Knights	Released, made Newcastle debut 27 May

== Other teams ==
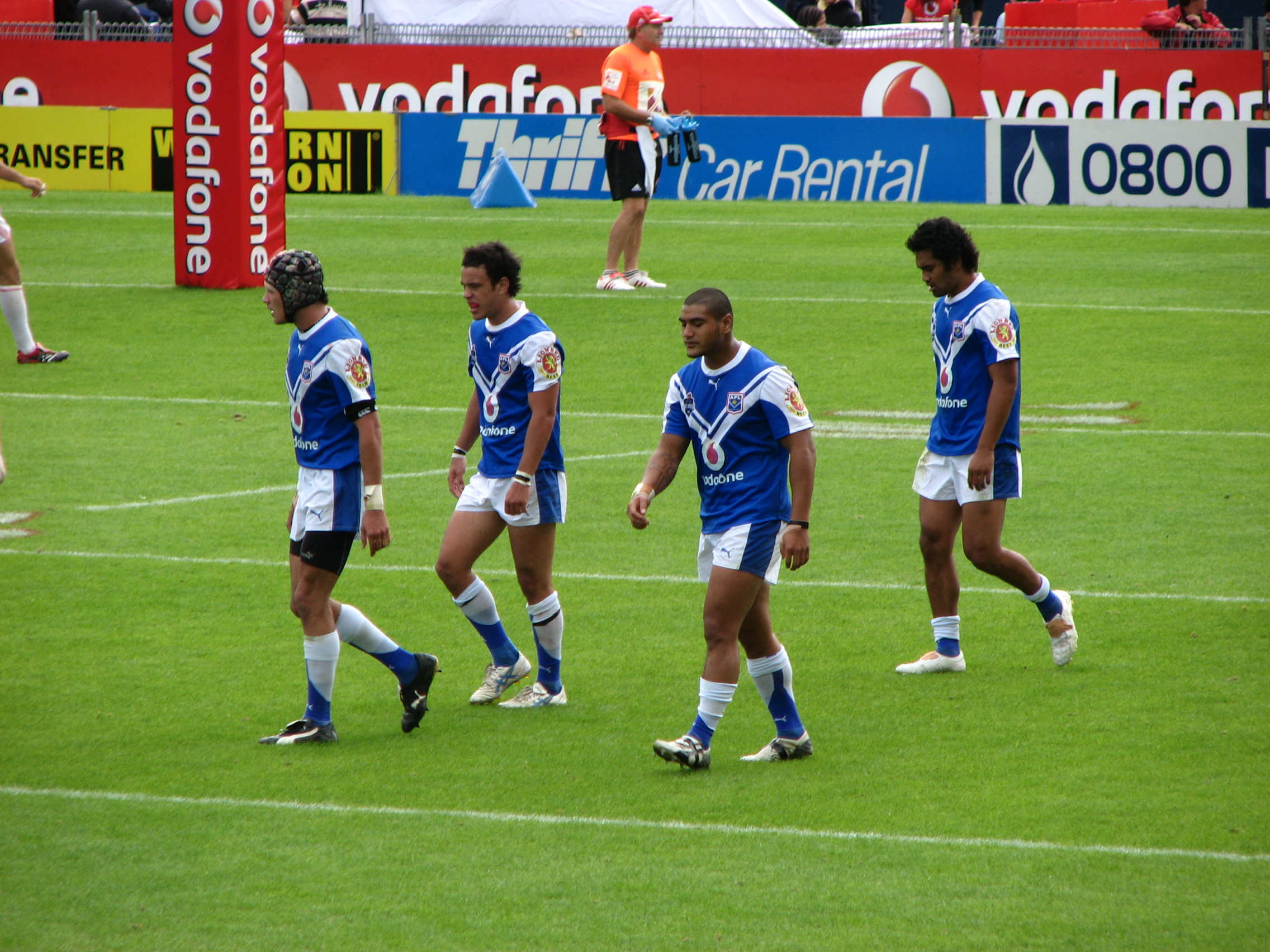
Auckland Lions Premier League players during a match against St George Illawarra

Senior players who were not required for the first team played with the Auckland Lions in the NSWRL Premier League. Graeme Norton coached the side which finished in tenth spot (out of thirteen), just two wins outside of the top eight.

The Auckland Lions featured many players who were yet to make their first grade debuts for the Warriors, such as Leeson Ah Mau, Sonny Fai, Isaac John, Aidan Kirk, Kevin Locke, Russell Packer and Malo Solomona.

== Awards ==
Steve Price won the Player of the Year award.
