= 2007 Manly Warringah Sea Eagles season =

← 2006	2008 →

The 2007 Manly Warringah Sea Eagles season was the 58th in the club's history. They competed for the National Rugby League's 2007 Telstra Premiership and finished the regular season in 2nd (out of 16) place. The Sea Eagles went on to reach the 2007 NRL grand final which they lost to minor premiers, the Melbourne Storm (who were later stripped of this title after being found guilty of salary cap breaches).

== Season summary ==
In June English club Warrington Wolves signed 30-year-old Manly winger Chris Hicks on a two-year deal from the following season. Manly only lost six matches in the 2007 season. Their 50-16 mauling of Newcastle ensured they would finish in the top two. Throughout the season they were the only club chasing Melbourne (whom they beat in round 11) for the minor premiership. After defeating North Queensland at the Sydney Football Stadium 28–6, Manly played in their 15th grand final against Melbourne. Manly were beaten 34–8 by the Storm on 30 September at Telstra Stadium. Melbourne was later stripped of the 2007 title for salary cap breaches. Manly were not recognised as the 2007 premiers (the premierships for 2007 and 2009 being declared null and void). On Sunday 30th Sept 2007, Manly lost the grand final to Melbourne Storm. This title has since been stripped from the Storm; this had led to calls for Manly to be given the 2007 title, however the NRL have refused. The Sea Eagles however did win the 2008 premiership, and, given that the Storm also lost its 2009 title, Manly have argued they should be the defending premiers in 2010, but again the NRL have refused to acknowledge this.

== Ladder ==
2007 NRL season
Pos	Team	Pld	W	D	L	B	PF	PA	PD	Pts
1	Melbourne Storm	24	21	0	3	1	627	277	+350	44
2	Manly-Warringah Sea Eagles	24	18	0	6	1	597	377	+220	38
3	North Queensland Cowboys	24	15	0	9	1	547	618	−71	32
4	New Zealand Warriors	24	13	1	10	1	593	434	+159	29
5	Parramatta Eels	24	13	0	11	1	573	481	+92	28
6	Canterbury-Bankstown Bulldogs	24	12	0	12	1	575	528	+47	26
7	South Sydney Rabbitohs	24	12	0	12	1	408	399	+9	26
8	Brisbane Broncos	24	11	0	13	1	511	476	+35	24
9	Wests Tigers	24	11	0	13	1	541	561	−20	24
10	Sydney Roosters	24	10	1	13	1	445	610	−165	23
11	Cronulla-Sutherland Sharks	24	10	0	14	1	463	403	+60	22
12	Gold Coast Titans	24	10	0	14	1	409	559	−150	22
13	St George Illawarra Dragons	24	9	0	15	1	431	509	−78	20
14	Canberra Raiders	24	9	0	15	1	522	652	−130	20
15	Newcastle Knights	24	9	0	15	1	418	708	−290	20
16	Penrith Panthers	24	8	0	16	1	539	607	−68	18

== Players ==
Current to Round 19, 2007
Player	Appearances	Tries	Goals	F Goals	Points

=== Player movements ===
Gains

2007 Signings/Transfers
Player	Previous club	Years signed	Until the end of

Losses

Losses
Player	Notes

Re-Signings

Re-Signings
