= 2007 South Sydney Rabbitohs season =

- NRL rank: First Grade
- Play-off result: 7th
- 2007 record: Wins: 12; losses: 25

Team information
- CEO: Shane Richardson
- Coach: Jason Taylor
- Captain: Roy Asotasi, Peter Cusack
- Stadium: Telstra Stadium

Top scorers
- Tries: Nathan Merritt (10)
- Goals: (Australia)
- Points: Joe Williams (88)
← 2006	2008 →

The 2007 South Sydney Rabbitohs season was the 98th in the club's history. They competed in National Rugby League season 2007 under the new ownership of Russell Crowe and Peter Holmes à Court and with a new coach in Jason Taylor. The club finished the regular season 7th (out of 16) and were knocked out of the play-offs by eventual grand-finalists Manly-Warringah.

== Season summary ==
The Rabbitohs' 2007 season was detailed in the documentary South Side Story.

After three rounds South Sydney had three wins, matching their total win tally of the previous season. The Bulldogs brought them back to earth in round 4. The Rabbitohs' co-captain, Kiwi international forward David Kidwell, then fell in a freak accident at a family barbecue and injured his knee. He would require knee re-construction surgery and was not expected to return for the rest of the season.

Souths signed Craig Wing mid-season. The Souths junior would play out the rest of 2007 with the Sydney Roosters before returning to the Rabbitohs for 2008.

For the first time in 18 years the South Sydney Rabbitohs made it to the finals series, finishing in 7th position.

Roy Asotasi won the George Piggins Medal as the club's player of the year.

== Results ==
Round	Opponent	Result	Rabbitohs	Opponent	Date	Venue	Crowd
1	Sydney Roosters	Win	18	6	Mar 19	Sydney Football Stadium	24,127
2	Parramatta Eels	Win	31	6	Mar 25	Telstra Stadium	15,165
3	Cronulla Sharks	Win	26	16	Mar 31	Toyota Park	17,866
4	Canterbury Bulldogs	Loss	10	34	Apr 6	Telstra Stadium	34,315
5	Newcastle Knights	Loss	22	23	Apr 15	Bluetongue Stadium	18,321
6	North Queensland Cowboys	Win	10	6	Apr 23	Dairy Farmers Stadium	17,678
7	New Zealand Warriors	Loss	16	18	Apr 29	Telstra Stadium	13,044
8	Brisbane Broncos	Loss	4	8	May 4	Suncorp Stadium	27,387
9	Canberra Raiders	Loss	10	16	May 12	Telstra Stadium	11,088
10	BYE						
11	Gold Coast Titans	Loss	18	25	May 26	Metricon Stadium	17,266
12	Melbourne Storm	Loss	10	26	Jun 2	Olympic Park	11,211
13	Penrith Panthers	Win	14	4	Jun 8	Telstra Stadium	5,053
14	Manly Sea Eagles	Loss	2	14	Jun 15	Brookvale Oval	7,341
15	Cronulla Sharks	Win	16	12	Jun 24	Telstra Stadium	9,568
16	Newcastle Knights	Win	28	25	Jun 29	EnergyAustralia Stadium	16,320
17	Melbourne Storm	Loss	8	12	Jul 7	Bluetongue Stadium	14,288
18	Parramatta Eels	Loss	12	18	Jul 15	Parramatta Stadium	15,202
19	North Queensland Cowboys	Win	20	14	Jul 22	Telstra Stadium	10,022
20	Gold Coast Titans	Win	20	14	Jul 28	Telstra Stadium	13,351
21	Penrith Panthers	Loss	16	32	Aug 4	CUA Stadium	10,845
22	St George Illawarra Dragons	Win	24	14	Aug 11	WIN Stadium	18,382
23	Manly Sea Eagles	Win	24	18	Aug 20	Telstra Stadium	12,087
24	Wests Tigers	Win	37	12	Aug 26	Leichhardt Oval	20,232
25	Sydney Roosters	Loss	12	26	Sep 1	Telstra Stadium	32,125
Qualifying Final	Manly Sea Eagles	Loss	6	30	Sep 8	Brookvale Oval	19,785

== Ladder ==
2007 NRL season
Pos	Team	Pld	W	D	L	B	PF	PA	PD	Pts
1	Melbourne Storm	24	21	0	3	1	627	277	+350	44
2	Manly-Warringah Sea Eagles	24	18	0	6	1	597	377	+220	38
3	North Queensland Cowboys	24	15	0	9	1	547	618	−71	32
4	New Zealand Warriors	24	13	1	10	1	593	434	+159	29
5	Parramatta Eels	24	13	0	11	1	573	481	+92	28
6	Canterbury-Bankstown Bulldogs	24	12	0	12	1	575	528	+47	26
7	South Sydney Rabbitohs	24	12	0	12	1	408	399	+9	26
8	Brisbane Broncos	24	11	0	13	1	511	476	+35	24
9	Wests Tigers	24	11	0	13	1	541	561	−20	24
10	Sydney Roosters	24	10	1	13	1	445	610	−165	23
11	Cronulla-Sutherland Sharks	24	10	0	14	1	463	403	+60	22
12	Gold Coast Titans	24	10	0	14	1	409	559	−150	22
13	St George Illawarra Dragons	24	9	0	15	1	431	509	−78	20
14	Canberra Raiders	24	9	0	15	1	522	652	−130	20
15	Newcastle Knights	24	9	0	15	1	418	708	−290	20
16	Penrith Panthers	24	8	0	16	1	539	607	−68	18

== Players ==
After Round 25, 2007
Player	Appearances	Tries	Goals	F Goals	Points
Joe Williams	14	1	40/51	2	86
Nathan Merritt	22	10	17/26		74
Nigel Vagana	24	7			28
Fetuli Talanoa	11	6			24
Yileen Gordon	7	5			20
Dean Widders	24	5			20
Roy Asotasi	24	4			16
Shannon Hegarty	18	4			16
Paul Mellor	18	4			16
Jeremy Smith	21	4			16
David Fa'alogo	22	3			12
David Peachey	14	3			12
Ben Rogers	14	3			12
John Sutton	15	3			12
Issac Luke	13	2	2/3		12
Eddie Paea	3	2	0/2		8
Shane Rigon	19	2			8
Reece Simmonds	7	1	2/2		8
Daniel Irvine	11	1			4
David Kidwell	4	1			4
Beau Champion	1				
Peter Cusack	24				
Joe Galuvao	4				
Scott Geddes	11				
Michael Greenfield	4				
Jaiman Lowe	10				
Manase Manuokafoa	13				
Shannan McPherson	3				
Eddy Pettybourne	1				
Luke Stuart	23				
Stuart Webb	9				

=== Player movements ===
Gains

2008 Signings/Transfers
Player	Previous club	Years signed	Until the end of
Craig Wing	Sydney Roosters	4	2011
Nathanael Barnes	Tweed Heads Seagulls		
John Tamanika	Brisbane Easts Tigers		
Jamie Simpson	Toowoomba Clydesdales		
Luke Capewell	Brisbane Easts Tigers		
George Ndaira	Sydney Roosters		
Chris Sandow	Gold Coast Titans		

Losses

Losses
Player	Future Club/Playing Status
David Peachey	Retired
Daniel Irvine	Retired
Paul Mellor	Retired
Shane Rigon	Retired
Reece Simmonds	Retired
Joe Williams	Penrith Panthers
Joe Galuvao	Parramatta Eels
Stuart Webb	St. George Illawarra Dragons
Joe Falemaka	St. George Illawarra Dragons
Jardine Bobongie	St. George Illawarra Dragons
Peter Cusack	Hull

Re-Signings

Re-Signings
Player	Years signed	Until the end of
Jaiman Lowe	2	2009
Luke Stuart	1	2008
David Fa'alogo	4	2011
Fetuli Talanoa	3	2010
Yileen Gordon	2	2009
Eddie Paea	1	2008
Issac Luke	2	2009
Michael Greenfield	2	2009
John Sutton	3	2011
Nathan Merritt	3	2011

== Kit and Sponsors ==
=== National Australia Bank ===
The National Australia Bank was the Rabbitohs major home sponsor for the 2007 Telstra Premiership.

=== DeLonghi ===
DeLonghi was the major away sponsor for the Rabbitohs in the 2007 Telstra Premiership.

=== V8 Supercars Australia ===
V8 Supercars was the Rabbitohs major sleeve sponsor for the 2007 Telstra Premiership.

=== Virgin Blue ===
Virgin Blue was the Rabbitohs major training sponsor for the 2007 Telstra Premiership.

== Player statistics ==
Player	Appearances	Tries	Goals	Field Goals	Total Points
–	–	–	–	–	–

== Representative Honours ==
Player	All Stars	ANZAC Test	Pacific Test	City / Country	State of Origin 1	State of Origin 2	State of Origin 3	Four Nations
