= 2007 Parramatta Eels season =

Australia Rugby League Parramatta Eels 2007 season

- NRL Rank: 5th
- Play-off result: Preliminary Finalists (Lost 10–26 vs Melbourne Storm, 2nd Preliminary Final*)
- World Club Challenge: DNQ
- 2007 record: Wins: 13; draws: 0; losses: 11
- Points scored: For: 573; against: 481

Team information
- CEO: Denis Fitzgerald
- Coach: (Australia) Michael Hagan
- Captain: (New Zealand) Nathan Cayless (Australia) Nathan Hindmarsh
- Stadium: Parramatta Stadium (Capacity: 20,741); ANZ Stadium (Capacity: 83,500)
- Avg. attendance: 14,142 (Home); 15,783 (Home & Away); 37,598 (Finals Series)
- Agg. attendance: 169,706 (Home); 378,797 (Home & Away); 112,793 (Finals Series)
- High attendance: 50,621 (25 September vs Canterbury-Bankstown Bulldogs, 1st Semi Final)

Top scorers
- Tries: (Australia) Jarryd Hayne (14)
- Goals: (Australia) Luke Burt (59)
- Points: (Australia) Luke Burt (154)
← 2006	List of seasons	2008 →

The 2007 Parramatta Eels Season was the 61st in the club's history. They competed in the NRL's 2007 Telstra Premiership, finishing the regular season in 5th position, and came within one match of the grand final only to be knocked out by eventual premiers, Melbourne Storm, who would later be stripped of this title after being found guilty of salary cap breaches.

== Summary ==
Under new coach Michael Hagan, Parramatta saw a great performance in season 2007, spending most of the season in third place (behind the Storm and Manly) before a late season form slump, only stopped with a huge 68-22 demolition of defending premiers Brisbane saw them settle for fifth position at the end of the season. In the first week of the finals, they defeated the New Zealand Warriors away, 12–10 to set up a huge clash with arch-rivals Canterbury the following week. In an incident-filled match at ANZ Stadium in front of 50,621, Parramatta ran out 25–6 winners gaining revenge for their infamous preliminary final loss to Canterbury in the 1998 NRL season.

The win booked them a preliminary final clash with Minor Premiers Melbourne Storm. In a gruelling match at Melbourne's Telstra Dome, the Storm eventually won 26–10 ending Parramatta's 2007 season, one win away from their first Grand Final appearance since 2001. Later it was revealed by the NRL that the Melbourne Storm had in fact breached the salary cap that season, and they were stripped of their minor premiership and their title for the 2007 season. Parramatta spent most of the season inside the top four, however a patch of poor form late in the season saw them finish fifth despite a last round 68-22 thrashing of the Brisbane Broncos at home. Late season losses to Newcastle, Cronulla, Melbourne and St. George Illawarra proved costly.

== Standings ==
2007 NRL season
Pos	Team	Pld	W	D	L	B	PF	PA	PD	Pts
1	Melbourne Storm	24	21	0	3	1	627	277	+350	44
2	Manly-Warringah Sea Eagles	24	18	0	6	1	597	377	+220	38
3	North Queensland Cowboys	24	15	0	9	1	547	618	−71	32
4	New Zealand Warriors	24	13	1	10	1	593	434	+159	29
5	Parramatta Eels	24	13	0	11	1	573	481	+92	28
6	Canterbury-Bankstown Bulldogs	24	12	0	12	1	575	528	+47	26
7	South Sydney Rabbitohs	24	12	0	12	1	408	399	+9	26
8	Brisbane Broncos	24	11	0	13	1	511	476	+35	24
9	Wests Tigers	24	11	0	13	1	541	561	−20	24
10	Sydney Roosters	24	10	1	13	1	445	610	−165	23
11	Cronulla-Sutherland Sharks	24	10	0	14	1	463	403	+60	22
12	Gold Coast Titans	24	10	0	14	1	409	559	−150	22
13	St George Illawarra Dragons	24	9	0	15	1	431	509	−78	20
14	Canberra Raiders	24	9	0	15	1	522	652	−130	20
15	Newcastle Knights	24	9	0	15	1	418	708	−290	20
16	Penrith Panthers	24	8	0	16	1	539	607	−68	18

== Fixtures ==
=== Home and away season ===
Round	Opponent	Result	Eels	Opponent	Date	Venue	Crowd	Position
1	New Zealand Warriors	Loss	18	34	17 March 2007	Mt Smart Stadium	13,587	14/16
2	South Sydney Rabbitohs	Loss	6	31	25 March 2007	Telstra Stadium	15,165	14/16
3	Wests Tigers	Win	22	20	30 March 2007	Parramatta Stadium	18,142	13/16
4	Canberra Raiders	Win	38	6	7 April 2007	Parramatta Stadium	10,091	9/16
5	Penrith Panthers	Win	27	14	13 April 2007	CUA Stadium	18,756	6/16
6	Bulldogs	Loss	18	21	22 April 2007	Parramatta Stadium	18,285	8/16
7	Gold Coast Titans	Loss	12	38	29 April 2007	Metricon Stadium	18,021	11/16
8	Sydney Roosters	Win	28	10	5 May 2007	Parramatta Stadium	13,021	10/16
9	Manly-Warringah Sea Eagles	Loss	12	22	11 May 2007	Brookvale Oval	19,944	10/16
10	North Queensland Cowboys	Win	44	14	19 May 2007	Parramatta Stadium	10,182	7/16
11	New Zealand Warriors	Win	30	6	28 May 2007	Parramatta Stadium	11,160	6/16
12	Wests Tigers	Win	38	8	4 June 2007	Telstra Stadium	22,245	4/16
13	Canberra Raiders	Loss	38	10	9 June 2007	Canberra Stadium	11,232	6/16
14	St George Illawarra Dragons	Win	20	12	17 June 2007	Parramatta Stadium	12,658	3/16
15	Sydney Roosters	Win	36	16	23 June 2007	Sydney Football Stadium	12,211	3/16
16	Bye	–	–	–	–	–	–	3/16
17	Newcastle Knights	Loss	10	34	9 July 2007	Parramatta Stadium	10,363	4/16
18	South Sydney Rabbitohs	Win	18	12	15 July 2007	Parramatta Stadium	15,202	3/16
19	Brisbane Broncos	Win	20	16	23 July 2007	Suncorp Stadium	25,762	3/16
20	Manly-Warringah Sea Eagles	Loss	24	32	29 July 2007	Parramatta Stadium	20,113	3/16
21	Bulldogs	Win	34	22	3 August 2007	Telstra Stadium	27,201	3/16
22	Cronulla Sharks	Loss	24	25	11 August 2007	Parramatta Stadium	13,376	3/16
23	Melbourne Storm	Loss	10	14	17 August 2007	Olympic Park Stadium	11,549	5/16
24	St George Illawarra Dragons	Loss	6	14	27 August 2007	WIN Stadium	13,488	6/16
25	Brisbane Broncos	Win	68	22	2 September 2007	Parramatta Stadium	17,112	5/16

=== Finals series ===
Round	Opponent	Result	Eels	Opponent	Date	Venue	Crowd	Position
QF	New Zealand Warriors	Win	12	10	7 September 2007	Mt Smart Stadium	28,745	–
SF	Bulldogs	Win	25	6	15 September 2007	Telstra Stadium	50,621	–
PF	Melbourne Storm	Loss	10	26	23 September 2007	Telstra Dome	33,427	–

== Players and staff ==
The playing squad and coaching staff of the Parramatta Eels for the 2007 NRL season as of 27 December 2006.

No.

Position
Player

1 Jarryd Hayne – FB 2 Krisnan Inu – WG 3 Joel Reddy – CE 4 Timana Tahu – CE 5 Eric Grothe, Jr. – WG 6 Brett Finch – FE 7 Tim Smith – HB 8 Nathan Cayless – PR (Captain) 9 Mark Riddell – HK 10 Fuifui Moimoi – PR 11 Nathan Hindmarsh – SR 12 Chad Robinson – SR 13 Daniel Wagon – LK

No.

Position
Player

14 PJ Marsh – HK 15 Josh Cordoba – PR 16 Feleti Mateo – SR 17 Ian Hindmarsh – SR Aaron Cannings – PR Todd Lowrie – SR Richard Fa'aoso – PR Blake Green – FE Ben Smith – FB Weller Hauraki – SR Luke Burt – CE Brendan Oake – SR Junior Paulo – PR Justin Tsoulos – PR

== Statistics ==
Player	Games	Tries	Goals	F. Goals	Points
Luke Burt	16	9	59/70	0	154
Krisnan Inu	20	12	37/45	0	122
Jarryd Hayne	25	12	0/1	0	48
Eric Grothe, Jr.	23	11	0	0	44
Feleti Mateo	25	9	0	0	36
Ben Smith	23	8	0	0	32
Nathan Hindmarsh	22	7	0	0	28
Timana Tahu	18	7	0/1	0	28
Mark Riddell	23	5	0/1	0	20
Ian Hindmarsh	24	4	0/1	1	17
Tim Smith	27	3	1/1	0	14
Nathan Cayless	22	3	0	0	12
Joel Reddy	10	3	0	0	12
Daniel Wagon	22	3	0	0	12
Brett Finch	25	2	0	1	9
PJ Marsh	27	2	0	0	8
Chad Robinson	20	2	0	0	8
Aaron Cannings	21	1	0	0	4
Josh Cordoba	25	1	0	0	4
Fuifui Moimoi	21	1	0	0	4
Zeb Taia	3	1	0	0	4
Blake Green	6	0	0	0	0
Weller Hauraki	5	0	0	0	0
Junior Paulo	3	0	0	0	0
Todd Lowrie	2	0	0	0	0
Richard Fa'aoso	1	4	0	0	0

== Awards ==
- Michael Cronin clubman of the year award: Ian Hindmarsh
- Ken Thornett Medal (Players' player): Nathan Hindmarsh
- Jack Gibson Award (Coach's award): Luke Burt
- Eric Grothe Rookie of the Year Award: Krisnan Inu
