= 2007 Newcastle Knights season =

| ← 2006 | 2008 → |

The 2007 Newcastle Knights season was the 20th in the club's history. They competed in the NRL's 2007 Telstra Premiership, finishing second-last.

== Season summary ==
2007 was a year of turmoil for the Newcastle Knights club both on and off the field. After making a promising start to the season with victories over contenders such as the Canterbury Bulldogs – the club and rugby league world was rocked by the shock retirement of Andrew Johns. The departure of their captain and most influential player had an obvious effect on the team, and although they managed to stay in touch with the top eight until the last third of the season, their season was irreparably damaged by his absence. In addition to this – the Knights endured the worst injury toll in the 2007 season – fielding thirty seven players in first grade by season's end.

The club also struggled off-field, with Brian Smith's decision to release loyal clubmen such as Clint Newton (who subsequently won a grand final with the Melbourne Storm; which was later stripped due to salary cap breaches), Kirk Reynoldson, and Josh Perry (who subsequently played in Manly's 2008 premiership) meeting with displeasure from the Sydney media and some sections of the Newcastle support base. Newton's defection to Melbourne and Reynoldson's threats of legal action over the club refusing to play him in the fifteen games required to trigger his fourth contract year saw the club's reputation dragged through the mud. The Daily Telegraph campaigned strongly for the sacking of Smith whilst Bluetongue owner John Singleton also threatened legal action after the releases lead to a multimillion-dollar advertising campaign being cancelled. To cap it all off, Andrew Johns again made the press late in the season after being arrested for ecstasy possession in the United Kingdom and confessing to having been a drug addict for the entirety of his playing career.

Despite these pressures, the Knights managed to avoid a second wooden spoon in three years – offloading the dreaded piece of 'silverware' to the Penrith Panthers with a last round victory over the Wests Tigers.

== Ladder ==
2007 NRL season
| Pos | Team | Pld | W | D | L | B | PF | PA | PD | Pts |
|---|---|---|---|---|---|---|---|---|---|---|
| 1 | Melbourne Storm | 24 | 21 | 0 | 3 | 1 | 627 | 277 | +350 | 44 |
| 2 | Manly-Warringah Sea Eagles | 24 | 18 | 0 | 6 | 1 | 597 | 377 | +220 | 38 |
| 3 | North Queensland Cowboys | 24 | 15 | 0 | 9 | 1 | 547 | 618 | −71 | 32 |
| 4 | New Zealand Warriors | 24 | 13 | 1 | 10 | 1 | 593 | 434 | +159 | 29 |
| 5 | Parramatta Eels | 24 | 13 | 0 | 11 | 1 | 573 | 481 | +92 | 28 |
| 6 | Canterbury-Bankstown Bulldogs | 24 | 12 | 0 | 12 | 1 | 575 | 528 | +47 | 26 |
| 7 | South Sydney Rabbitohs | 24 | 12 | 0 | 12 | 1 | 408 | 399 | +9 | 26 |
| 8 | Brisbane Broncos | 24 | 11 | 0 | 13 | 1 | 511 | 476 | +35 | 24 |
| 9 | Wests Tigers | 24 | 11 | 0 | 13 | 1 | 541 | 561 | −20 | 24 |
| 10 | Sydney Roosters | 24 | 10 | 1 | 13 | 1 | 445 | 610 | −165 | 23 |
| 11 | Cronulla-Sutherland Sharks | 24 | 10 | 0 | 14 | 1 | 463 | 403 | +60 | 22 |
| 12 | Gold Coast Titans | 24 | 10 | 0 | 14 | 1 | 409 | 559 | −150 | 22 |
| 13 | St George Illawarra Dragons | 24 | 9 | 0 | 15 | 1 | 431 | 509 | −78 | 20 |
| 14 | Canberra Raiders | 24 | 9 | 0 | 15 | 1 | 522 | 652 | −130 | 20 |
| 15 | Newcastle Knights | 24 | 9 | 0 | 15 | 1 | 418 | 708 | −290 | 20 |
| 16 | Penrith Panthers | 24 | 8 | 0 | 16 | 1 | 539 | 607 | −68 | 18 |

== Fixtures ==
=== Regular season ===
Season 2007 – Draw and Results
| Round | Date & Time | Knights vs | Venue | Result | Scorers | Crowd |
|---|---|---|---|---|---|---|
| 1 | Sun, 18 March; 2pm | Bulldogs | EnergyAustralia Stadium | Win | Knights(25): Terrence Seu Seu, Josh Perry, Todd Polglase, James McManus tries; Kurt Gidley (4/5) goals; Kurt Gidley field goal. Bulldogs(24): Andrew Ryan, Luke Patten, Reni Maitua, Trent Cutler tries; Hazem El Masri (4/4) goals. | 18,791 |
| 2 | Fri, 23 March; 7:30pm | Dragons | Oki Jubilee Stadium | Win | Dragons(12): Chase Stanley, Keith Lulia tries; Wes Naiqama (2/3) goals Knights(16): Clint Newton, James McManus, Brad Tighe, George Carmont tries; Kurt Gidley (0/3), Daniel Abraham (0/1) goals | 12,326 |
| 3 | Mon, 2 April; 7pm | Raiders | Canberra Stadium | Loss | Canberra(48): William Zillman(3), Marshall Chalk, Lincoln Withers, Scott Logan, Colin Best, Phil Graham tries; Michael Dobson (8/10) goals. Knights(18): Adam MacDougall, Milton Thaiday, Cory Paterson tries; Andrew Johns (3/3) goals. | 13,109 |
| 4 | Sat, 7 April; 5:30pm | Storm | Energy Australia Stadium | Loss | Knights(12): Steve Simpson, Daniel Abraham tries, Kurt Gidley (2/2) goals. Storm(22): Israel Folau(2), Matt King, Anthony Quinn tries, Cameron Smith (3/4) goals. | 20,051 |
| 5 | Sun, 15 April; 2pm | Rabbitohs | Bluetongue Stadium | Win | Rabbitohs(22): David Faalogo, Dean Widders, Nigel Vagana, John Sutton tries, Joe Williams (3/4) goals. Knights(23): Kurt Gidley(2), James McManus, Brad Tighe tries, Kurt Gidley (3/4) goals, Kurt Gidley field goal. | 18,321 |
| 6 | Sun, 22 April; 7pm | Broncos | Energy Australia Stadium | Loss | Knights(16): Todd Polglase(2), Adam MacDougall tries, Kurt Gidley (2/3) goals. Broncos(20): Darren Lockyer (1/1), Michael Ennis (1/3) goals. | 25,524 |
| 7 | Mon, 30 April; 7pm | Sharks | Energy Australia Stadium | Win | Knights(20): Kirk Reynoldson(2), Kurt Gidley tries, Kurt Gidley (4/4) goals. Sharks(16): David Simmons(2), Ben Pomeroy tries, Luke Covell (2/3) goals. | 15,453 |
| 8 | Sun, 6 May; 3pm | Bulldogs | Telstra Stadium | Loss | Bulldogs(30): Luke Patten(2), Reni Maitua, Matthew Utai, Hazem El Masri tries, Hazem El Masri (5/5) goals. Knights(16): Cory Paterson, Danny Buderus, James McManus tries, Kurt Gidley (2/3) goals. | 12,654 |
| 9 | Sat, 12 May; 5:30pm | Warriors | Energy Australia Stadium | Win | Knights(24): Kurt Gidley(2), Steve Simpson, Adam MacDougall tries, Kurt Gidley (4/4) goals. Warriors(18): Ruben Wiki, Nathan Fien, Jerome Ropati tries, Lance Hohaia (3/3) goals. | 15,107 |
| 10 | BYE | - | - | - | | - |
| 11 | Sun, 27 May; 2pm | Broncos | Suncorp Stadium | Loss | Broncos(71): Tonie Carroll(2), Brent Tate(2), Justin Hodges(2), Joel Moon, Greg Eastwood, Ben Hannant, Petero Civoniceva, Darius Boyd, Karmichael Hunt tries, Corey Parker (4/5), Michael Ennis (4/4), Darren Lockyer (3/3), Darren Lockyer field goal. Knights(6): Jarrod Mullen try, Cory Paterson (1/1) goal. | 27,433 |
| 12 | Sat, 2 June; 5:30pm | Roosters | Bluetongue Stadium | Win | Roosters(18): Mitchell Pierce, Braith Anasta, Anthony Minichiello tries, Craig Fitzgibbon (3/4) goals. Knights(22): Brad Tighe, James McManus, Nathan Hinton, Cory Paterson tries, Cory Paterson (3/4) goals. | 11,263 |
| 13 | Sun, 10 June; 3pm | Tigers | Energy Australia Stadium | Loss | Knights(14): Brad Tighe(2), Cory Paterson tries, Cory Paterson (1/3). Tigers(33): Liam Fulton, Chris Heighington, Taniela Tuiaki, Dean Collis, Robbie Farah tries, Dean Collis (6/6) goals, Robbie Farah field goal. | 13,609 |
| 14 | Mon, 18 Jun; 7pm | Raiders | Energy Australia Stadium | Win | Knights(22): Adam MacDougall(2), Chris Bailey, Brad Tighe tries, Kurt Gidley (3/5) goals. Raiders(18): Brad Cross, Lincoln Withers, Colin Best tries, Michael Dobson (3/3) goals. | 11,349 |
| 15 | Sat, 23 June; 7:30pm | Titans | Carrara Stadium | Loss | Titans(28): Matthew Peterson(3), Brett Delaney, Mat Rogers tries, Mat Rogers (4/5) goals. Knights(22): Daniel Tolar, Luke Walsh, Adam MacDougall, James McManus tries, Kurt Gidley (3/4) goals. | 15,306 |
| 16 | Fri, 29 June; 7:30pm | Rabbitohs | Energy Australia Stadium | Loss | Knights(25): Adam MacDougall, George Carmont, Cooper Vuna, Cory Paterson, James McManus tries, Cory Paterson (2/5) goals, Luke Walsh field goal. Rabbitohs(28): Roy Asotasi(2), Nigel Vagana, Jeremy Smith, Ben Rogers tries, Reece Simmonds (2/2), Isaac Luke (2/3) goals. | 16,320 |
| 17 | Mon, 9 July; 7pm | Eels | Parramatta Stadium | Win | Eels(10): Krisnan Inu, Feleti Mateo tries, Krisnan Inu (1/1), Mark Riddell (0/1) goals. Knights(34): George Carmont(2), Steve Simpson, Mitchell Sargent, Adam MacDougall, James McManus tries, Kurt Gidley (5/7) goals. | 10,363 |
| 18 | Mon, 16 July; 7pm | Storm | Olympic Park | Loss | Storm(44): Steve Turner(2), Anthony Quinn(2), Billy Slater(2), Ryan Hoffman, Matt King, Clint Newton tries, Cameron Smith (3/6), Steve Turner (1/3) goals. Knights(0) | 10,223 |
| 19 | Sat, 21 July; 7:30pm | Roosters | Energy Australia Stadium | Loss | Knights(17): Cooper Vuna(2), Adam MacDougall tries, Kurt Gidley (2/3) goals, Luke Walsh field goal. Roosters(20): David Shillington, Joel Monaghan, Lopini Paea, Mitchell Aubusson tries, Craig Fitzgibbon (2/4) goals. | 15,171 |
| 20 | Sat, 28 July; 7:30pm | Warriors | Mt Smart Stadium | Loss | Warriors(52): Wade McKinnon(2), Grant Rovelli(2), Jerome Ropati(2), Steve Price, Wairangi Koopu, Manu Vatuvei tries, Michael Witt (8/9) goals. Knights(10): James McManus, Kirk Reynoldson tries, Kurt Gidley (1/2) goals. | 11,301 |
| 21 | Fri, 3 August; 7:30pm | Dragons | Energy Australia Stadium | Loss | Knights(4): Kurt Gidley try, Kurt Gidley (0/1) goal. Dragons(20): Jamie Soward(2), Dan Hunt, Chase Stanley tries, Jamie Soward (2/4) goals. | 12,573 |
| 22 | Fri, 10 August; 7:30pm | Sea Eagles | Bluetongue Stadium | Loss | Sea Eagles(50): Brett Stewart(2), Jamie Lyon(2), Jack Afamasaga, Glenn Stewart, Steve Menzies, Matt Orford, Adam Cuthbertson tries, Matt Orford (2/4), Jamie Lyon (4/4), Steve Menzies (1/1) goals. Knights(16): Brad Tighe, Steve Simpson, James McManus tries, Scott Dureau (2/3) goals. | 17,122 |
| 23 | Sun, 19 August; 3pm | Panthers | Energy Australia Stadium | Loss | Penrith(46): Frank Pritchard(3), Michael Jennings(3), Michael Gordon tries, Michael Gordon (9/9) goals. Knights(12): 2 tries, Kurt Gidley (2/2) goals. | 14,351 |
| 24 | Fri, 24 August; 7:30pm | Cowboys | Energy Australia Stadium | Loss | Cowboys(34): Ashley Graham(2), Johnathan Thurston, Matthew Bowen, Ty Williams, Neil Sweeney tries, Thurston (5/6) goals. Knights(18): Cooper Vuna, Chris Bailey, Cory Paterson tries, Kurt Gidley (3/3) goals. | 12,264 |
| 25 | Fri, 31 August; 7:30pm | Tigers | Energy Australia Stadium | Win | Tigers(24): Benji Marshall(2), Chris Lawrence, John Morris tries, Marshall (4/5) goals. Knights(26): Cooper Vuna(2), Cory Paterson, Kurt Gidley tries, Kurt Gidley (5/5) goals. | 13,446 |

== Players ==
Newcastle Knights 2007 Full-time Squad
| Player | | Position | DOB (Age) | Height | Weight | Previous club |
|---|---|---|---|---|---|---|
| Daniel Abraham | (Australia) | Lock/Utility | 1981-03-11 (26) | 188 cm | 106 kg | Macquarie United |
| Chris Bailey | (Australia) | Lock/Utility | 1982-07-05 (24) | 186 cm | 94 kg | Inverell Hawks |
| Riley Brown | (Australia) | Utility | 1984-10-15 (22) | 181 cm | 92 kg | Singleton |
| Danny Buderus | (Australia) | Hooker | 1978-02-06 (29) | 178 cm | 91 kg | Taree |
| George Carmont | (New Zealand) | Centre/Wing | 1978-06-30 (28) | 180 cm | 91 kg | Otahuhu |
| Scott Dureau | (Australia) | Five Eighth/Halfback | 1986-07-29 (20) | 174 cm | 83 kg | Port Macquarie |
| Paul Franze | (Australia) | Centre | 1982-05-03 (25) | 185 cm | 97 kg | Castleford Tigers |
| Kurt Gidley | (Australia) | Fullback/Utility | 1982-06-07 (24) | 182 cm | 87 kg | Western Suburbs (Newcastle) |
| Nathan Hinton | (Australia) | Fullback | 1985-10-13 (21) | 178 cm | 84 kg | Western Suburbs (Newcastle) |
| Marvin Karawana | (New Zealand) | Five Eighth | 1986-07-30 (20) | 180 cm | 94 kg | Canterbury Bulldogs |
| Adam MacDougall | (Australia) | Centre | 1975-05-08 (31) | 183 cm | 95 kg | South Sydney Rabbitohs |
| Luke MacDougall | (Australia) | Wing/Centre | 1983-02-05 (24) | 183 cm | 95 kg | St George Illawarra Dragons |
| James McManus | (Scotland) | Wing/Centre | 1986-01-15 (21) | 185 cm | 89 kg | - |
| Jarrod Mullen | (Australia) | Five Eighth/Halfback | 1987-04-09 (20) | 179 cm | 86 kg | Western Suburbs (Newcastle) |
| Cory Paterson | (Australia) | Second Row | 1987-07-14 (19) | 194 cm | 105 kg | - |
| Josh Perry | (Australia) | Prop | 1981-02-04 (26) | 187 cm | 119 kg | Valentine-Eleebana |
| Todd Polglase | (Australia) | Fullback/Wing/Centre | 1981-03-21 (26) | 178 cm | 85 kg | South Sydney Rabbitohs |
| Kirk Reynoldson | (Australia) | Second Row/Lock | 1979-03-11 (28) | 186 cm | 102 kg | Melbourne Storm |
| Jesse Royal | (New Zealand) | Prop/Second Row | 1980-05-20 (26) | 190 cm | 107 kg | Penrith Panthers |
| Mitchell Sargent | (Australia) | Prop | 1979-07-02 (27) | 187 cm | 107 kg | North Queensland Cowboys |
| David Seage | (Australia) | Fullback | 1979-11-29 (27) | 183 cm | 90 kg | - |
| Terrence Seu Seu | (New Zealand) | Hooker | 1987-11-20 (19) | 180 cm | 89 kg | - |
| Steve Simpson | (Australia) | Second Row | 1979-09-27 (27) | 187 cm | 104 kg | Singleton |
| Kade Snowden | (Australia) | Prop/Second Row | 1986-12-31 (20) | 188 cm | 113 kg | - |
| Zeb Taia | (Cook Islands) | Second Row | 1984-10-11 (22) | 186 cm | 104 kg | Parramatta Eels |
| Reegan Tanner | (Australia) | Second Row/Lock | 1982-09-27 (24) | 183 cm | 99 kg | Kurri Kurri |
| Mark Taufua | (Australia) | Prop/Second Row | 1981-10-24 (25) | 188 cm | 103 kg | Waratahs (Newcastle) |
| Milton Thaiday | (Australia) | Fullback | 1980-02-15 (27) | 175 cm | 83 kg | - |
| Brad Tighe | (Australia) | Centre/Wing | 1984-04-05 (23) | 183 cm | 89 kg | West Tamworth |
| Daniel Tolar | (Australia) | Prop | 1982-11-04 (25) | 188 cm | 100 kg | Central Charlestown |
| Willie Tupou | (Australia) | Second Row | 1985-10-26 (21) | 191 cm | 105 kg | St George Illawarra Dragons |
| Akuila Uate | (Fiji) | Wing | 1987-10-06 (19) | 185 cm | 94 kg | - |
| Cooper Vuna | (New Zealand) | Wing | 1987-07-05 (19) | 182 cm | 97 kg | New Zealand Warriors |
| Luke Walsh | (Australia) | Halfback | 1987-05-12 (19) | - | - | - |
| Matthew White | (Australia) | Prop | 1984-05-17 (22) | 190 cm | 110 kg | - |
| Adam Woolnough | (Australia) | Prop | 1982-05-24 (24) | 187 cm | 109 kg | Wingham Tigers |
| Michael Young | (Australia) | Lock/Utility | 1984-02-11 (23) | 181 cm | 90 kg | - |
