= 2007 Brisbane Broncos season =

NRL rugby league season

Coordinates: 27°27′53″S 153°0′34″E

- NRL rank: 8th
- Play-off result: Lost Qualifying Final, (Melbourne Storm, 0–40)
- World Club Challenge: Lost Final, (St Helens, 14–18).
- 2007 record: Wins: 11; losses: 14
- Points scored: For: 511; against: 476

Team information
- Managing Director: Bruno Cullen
- Director of Coaching: Wayne Bennett
- Captain: Darren Lockyer
- Stadium: Suncorp Stadium
- Avg. attendance: 32,868
- Agg. attendance: 394,415
- High attendance: 50,416 (North Queensland Cowboys, 16 March)
- Low attendance: 24,563 (Cronulla-Sutherland Sharks, 29 July)

Top scorers
- Tries: Justin Hodges (12)
- Goals: Corey Parker (48)
- Points: Corey Parker (116)
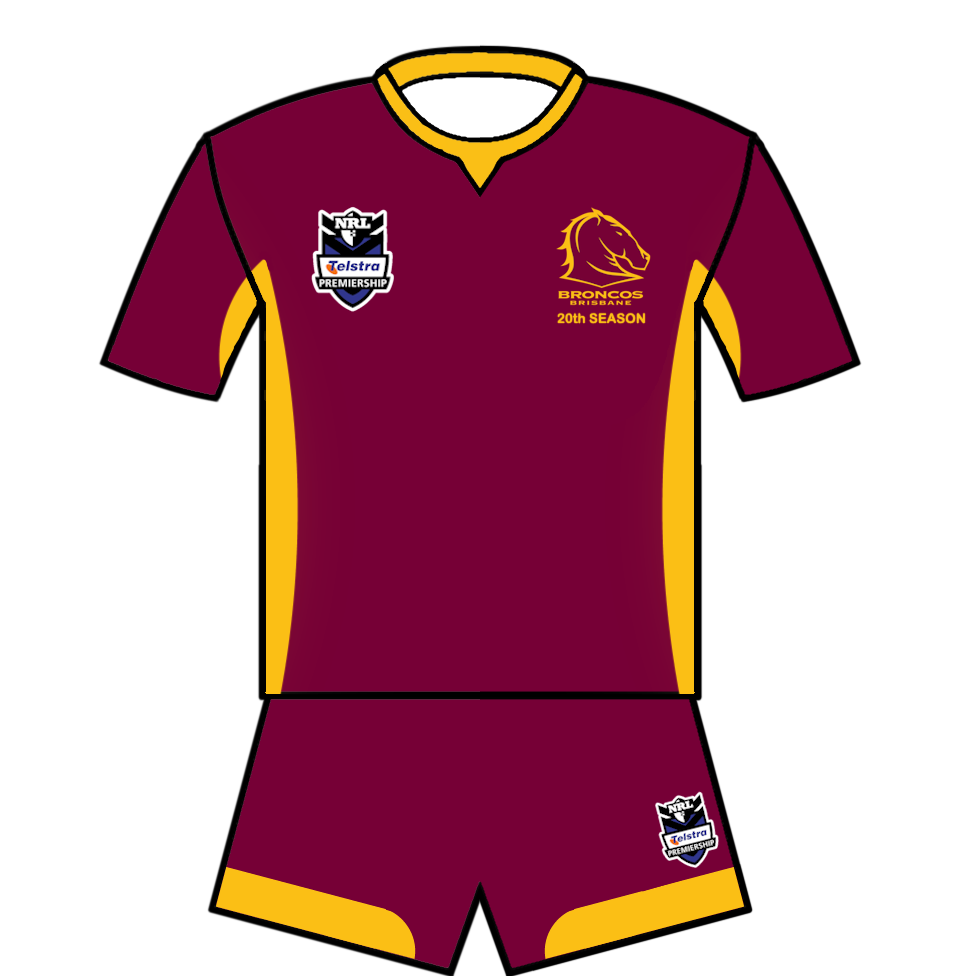
Home colours
← 2006	List of seasons	2008 →

The 2007 Brisbane Broncos season was the twentieth in the club's history and they competed in the NRL's 2007 Telstra Premiership. Coached by Wayne Bennett and captained by Darren Lockyer, the Broncos made the finals by just scraping into the top 8, but were knocked out in the first week by eventual premiers, Melbourne Storm. Two and a half years later the Storm would be found to have been cheating the salary cap over the previous four seasons and their 2007 premiership was stripped.

== Season Summary ==
The World Club Challenge loss was followed by a poor start to the 2007 NRL season by the Broncos, who lost their captain and five-eighth Darren Lockyer to an ankle injury after the first match against the North Queensland Cowboys. Lockyer returned to the field in Round 3 against the Penrith Panthers, but Brisbane had lost their first three games in a row for the first time since 1999. They racked up their first win against the Sydney Roosters in the traditional Good Friday match played by the two clubs. Another loss followed by a win in the Andrew Johns farewell against Newcastle in Round 6.

When, in the Round 7 replay of last year's grand-final, Brisbane were unable to defeat Melbourne, they had managed to win just 2 of their first seven games, compared to their strong starts in 2006 and 2005. Having not yet played an NRL game in 2007, Tame Tupou, the Broncos' top try-scorer for the previous season, left the club in round 7 for England. In round 11 Brisbane were at the bottom of the ladder before racking up their biggest ever win, defeating an under-strength Newcastle Knights 71–6. It was also the Knights' biggest ever loss and the most points the Broncos had ever scored in a game. This was followed up with a loss to an understrength St George Illawarra Dragons.

As a result of the team's form, coach Wayne Bennett gave the players time off during the Broncos' bye. This strategy appeared to be successful, with the team winning five successive games. However, in their Round 18 win against the Cowboys, Lockyer tore his anterior cruciate ligament, ruling him out for the rest of the season. Lockyer's injury, combined with injuries to big-name players Karmichael Hunt, Justin Hodges, Brent Tate and Shaun Berrigan, played a role in Brisbane winning just two of their last eight games of the season.

In the last round of the 2007 regular season, the Broncos suffered an embarrassing 68–22 loss to Parramatta, equalling their worst ever defeat and most points conceded in a match. However, the club still finished eighth after the regular season, thus making the finals for the sixteenth straight year. Brisbane's efforts did not improve the following Sunday when they played their 500th game ever and their last of the season, being defeated soundly by eventual premiers the Melbourne Storm 40–0. Only one year after winning the premiership, 2007 saw the second time ever that the Broncos lost more games than they won in a season of football.

At the end of the season the Brisbane Broncos hed a gala ball at which coach Wayne Bennett was made a life member of the club. His refusal to make an acceptance speech at the club's presentation ball showed the strain in his relationship with the Broncos. On 9 October 2007, the club announced the termination of the contracts of squad members Ian Lacey and John Te Reo, after they were involved in the assault of a man after the ball.

== Squad information ==
As of 9 September 2007

Cap.	Nat.	Player	Position	First Broncos game	Previous First Grade RL club
68	(Australia)	Brad Thorn	Second-row	1994	—N/a
76	(Australia)	Darren Lockyer (c)	Five-eighth	1995	—N/a
79	(Australia)	Tonie Carroll	Lock	1996	—N/a
87	(Australia)	Petero Civoniceva (vc)	Prop	1998	—N/a
93	(Australia)	Shaun Berrigan	Hooker	1999	—N/a
94	(Australia)	Dane Carlaw	Prop	1999	—N/a
100	(Australia)	Justin Hodges	Centre	2000	—N/a
106	(Australia)	Corey Parker	Second-row	2001	—N/a
110	(Australia)	Brent Tate	Centre	2001	—N/a
124	(Australia)	Craig Frawley	Wing	2003	(Australia) Canberra Raiders
127	(Australia)	David Stagg	Second-row	2003	—N/a
128	(Australia)	Sam Thaiday	Second-row	2003	—N/a
130	(Australia)	Karmichael Hunt	Fullback	2004	—N/a
138	(Australia)	Steve Michaels	Wing	2005	—N/a
139	(Australia)	Nick Kenny	Prop	2005	—N/a
140	(New Zealand)	Greg Eastwood	Lock	2005	—N/a
141	(Australia)	Darius Boyd	Wing	2006	—N/a
142	(Australia)	Shane Perry	Halfback	2006	(Australia) Canterbury-Bankstown Bulldogs
143	(Australia)	Michael Ennis	Hooker	2006	(Australia) St. George Illawarra Dragons
144	(Australia)	Ben Hannant	Prop	2006	(Australia) Sydney Roosters
145	(Australia)	Ian Lacey	Hooker	2006	—N/a
147	(Australia)	Joel Moon	Centre	2006	—N/a
148	(Australia)	Dave Taylor	Prop	2006	—N/a
149	(Australia)	Nick Emmett	Centre	2006	—N/a
151	(New Zealand)	John Te Reo	Hooker	2007	—N/a
152	(New Zealand)	Andrew Lomu	Prop	2007	(Australia) Canberra Raiders
153	(Australia)	Denan Kemp	Fullback	2007	—N/a
154	(Australia)	Mick Roberts	Hooker	2007	—N/a
155	(Samoa)	Clifford Manua	Prop	2007	(Australia) Cronulla-Sutherland Sharks
156	(Australia)	Alwyn Simpson	Wing	2007	—N/a
—	(Australia)	Brent McConnell	Halfback	Yet to debut	(Australia) North Queensland Cowboys

== Squad changes ==
=== Transfers in ===
Date	Pos.	Player	From	Year/s	Ref.
25 July 2006	Halfback	Brent McConnell	North Queensland Cowboys	—	

=== Transfers out ===
Date	Pos.	Player	To	Year/s	Ref.
	Prop	Shane Webcke	Retirement	—N/a	
	Hooker	Casey McGuire	Catalans Dragons		
	Wing	Scott Minto	North Queensland Cowboys		
	Prop	Ben Vaeau	North Queensland Cowboys		
	Wing	Fraser Anderson	Cronulla-Sutherland Sharks		
	Fullback	Nick Parfitt	Burleigh Bears		
	Wing	Tame Tupou	Bradford Bulls		

=== Re-signings ===
Date	Pos.	Player	Year/s	Ref.
16 April 2007	Second-row	Sam Thaiday	2 Years	
5 June 2007	Centre	Joel Moon	2 Years	
20 June 2007	Lock	Greg Eastwood	2 Years	
20 June 2007	Wing	Steve Michaels	2 Years	
20 June 2007	Fullback	Denan Kemp	1 Year	
14 August 2007	Fullback	Justin Hodges	4 Years	

== Coaching staff ==
Name	Role	Ref.
Wayne Bennett	Director of Coaching	
Ivan Henjak	Assistant Coach	
Peter Ryan	Defence Co-ordinator	
Paul Green	Kicking & Catching Co-ordinator	
Dean Benton	Performance Director	
Paul Bunn	Special Projects/Recruitment Manager	
Andrew Gee	Football/Team Manager	
Dan Baker	Strength Coach	
Rob Godbolt	Physiotherapist & Rehab Co-ordinator	
Allan Langer	Backs Co-ordinator	
Ben Ikin	Team Welfare Officer	
Tony Spencer	Trainer	
Ken Rach	Trainer	
Scott Barker	Video Analysis	

== Pre-season ==
The Broncos' pre-season involved two matches in England and two more trial matches upon their return to Australia.

=== World Club Challenge ===
As reigning NRL premiers, on 23 February 2007 The Brisbane Broncos played against English Super League champions St Helens R.F.C. in the 2007 World Club Challenge. St Helens took the match 18–14 in the last minutes.

23 February 2007
20:00 UTC+0

St. Helens	18–14	Brisbane Broncos
Tries: Gardner (2); Sculthorpe; Goals: Sculthorpe (3)	Report	Tries: Parker; Boyd; Goals: Parker (3)

Reebok Stadium, Bolton, United Kingdom
Attendance: 23,207
Referee: Steve Clark

== Telstra Premiership ==
=== Matches ===
^ Not a Broncos Home Game * Game following a Test match ** Game following a State of Origin Match
Round	Opponent	Result	Brisbane	Opponent	Date	Venue	Crowd	Position
Trial Match	Celtic Crusaders	Win	32	6	15 Feb	Brewery Field	2,000+	
WCC	St. Helens	Loss	14	18	23 Feb	Reebok Stadium	23,207	
Trial Match	Canberra Raiders	Win	18	12	24 Feb	Dolphin Oval		
Trial Match	Melbourne Storm	Loss	0	46	3 Mar	Princes Park	8,273	
1	North Queensland Cowboys	Loss	16	23	16 Mar	Suncorp Stadium	50,416	12/16
2	New Zealand Warriors	Loss	14	24	25 Mar	Mt Smart Stadium	16,738	12/16
3	Penrith Panthers	Loss	28	29	30 Mar	Suncorp Stadium	24,582	15/16
4	Sydney Roosters	Win	32	10	6 Apr	Sydney Football Stadium	11,476	12/16
5 ^	Gold Coast Titans	Loss	16	28	13 Apr	Suncorp Stadium	47,686	13/16
6 *	Newcastle Knights	Win	20	16	22 Apr	EnergyAustralia Stadium	25,524	11/16
7	Melbourne Storm	Loss	18	28	27 Apr	Suncorp Stadium	33,750	13/16
8	South Sydney Rabbitohs	Win	8	4	4 May	Suncorp Stadium	27,387	12/16
9	Cronulla Sharks	Loss	8	16	11 May	Toyota Park	12,262	13/16
10	Manly Sea Eagles	Loss	6	18	21 May	Brookvale Oval	13,493	14/16
11 **	Newcastle Knights	Win	71	6	27 May	Suncorp Stadium	27,433	12/16
12	St George Illawarra Dragons	Loss	4	11	1 Jun	Oki Jubilee Stadium	10,302	15/16
13	BYE							12/16
14 **	Canterbury Bulldogs	Win	19	12	15 Jun	Telstra Stadium	10,121	10/16
15	Wests Tigers	Win	48	18	25 Jun	Suncorp Stadium	29,364	9/16
16	Penrith Panthers	Win	24	16	30 Jun	CUA Stadium	8,553	7/16
17 **	Gold Coast Titans	Win	19	18	6 Jul	Suncorp Stadium	48,621	6/16
18	North Queensland Cowboys	Win	24	16	13 Jul	Dairy Farmers Stadium	25,126	5/16
19	Parramatta Eels	Loss	16	20	23 Jul	Suncorp Stadium	25,702	5/16
20	Cronulla Sharks	Win	30	16	29 Jul	Suncorp Stadium	24,563	5/16
21	Manly Sea Eagles	Loss	8	21	5 Aug	Suncorp Stadium	35,784	6/16
22	Melbourne Storm	Loss	6	14	12 Aug	Olympic Park		7/16
23	Canterbury Bulldogs	Loss	24	25	17 Aug	Suncorp Stadium	35,199	9/16
24	Canberra Raiders	Win	30	19	26 Aug	Suncorp Stadium	31,614	8/16
25	Parramatta Eels	Loss	22	68	2 Sep	Parramatta Stadium	17,112	8/16
QF	Melbourne Storm	Loss	0	40	9 Sep	Olympic Park	15,552	

=== Ladder ===
2007 NRL season
Pos	Team	Pld	W	D	L	B	PF	PA	PD	Pts
1	Melbourne Storm	24	21	0	3	1	627	277	+350	44
2	Manly-Warringah Sea Eagles	24	18	0	6	1	597	377	+220	38
3	North Queensland Cowboys	24	15	0	9	1	547	618	−71	32
4	New Zealand Warriors	24	13	1	10	1	593	434	+159	29
5	Parramatta Eels	24	13	0	11	1	573	481	+92	28
6	Canterbury-Bankstown Bulldogs	24	12	0	12	1	575	528	+47	26
7	South Sydney Rabbitohs	24	12	0	12	1	408	399	+9	26
8	Brisbane Broncos	24	11	0	13	1	511	476	+35	24
9	Wests Tigers	24	11	0	13	1	541	561	−20	24
10	Sydney Roosters	24	10	1	13	1	445	610	−165	23
11	Cronulla-Sutherland Sharks	24	10	0	14	1	463	403	+60	22
12	Gold Coast Titans	24	10	0	14	1	409	559	−150	22
13	St George Illawarra Dragons	24	9	0	15	1	431	509	−78	20
14	Canberra Raiders	24	9	0	15	1	522	652	−130	20
15	Newcastle Knights	24	9	0	15	1	418	708	−290	20
16	Penrith Panthers	24	8	0	16	1	539	607	−68	18

== Honours ==
=== League ===
- Nil

=== Club ===
- Player of the year: Petero Civoniceva
- Rookie of the year: David Taylor
- Back of the year: Karmichael Hunt
- Forward of the year: Brad Thorn
- Club man of the year: Petero Civoniceva/Brad Thorn

== Statistics ==
For NRL first-grade matches only.

Player	Tries	Goals	Field goals	Points
Corey Parker	4	45/54	0	106
Darren Lockyer	2	23/33	3	57
Justin Hodges	12	0	0	48
Steve Michaels	10	0	0	40
Karmichael Hunt	8	0	0	32
Tonie Carroll	7	0	0	28
Darius Boyd	6	0	0	24
Brent Tate	5	0	0	20
Greg Eastwood	5	0	0	20
Michael Ennis	1	7/8	0	18
Shaun Berrigan	4	0	0	16
Dane Carlaw	3	0	0	12
Dave Taylor	3	0	0	12
David Stagg	2	0	0	8
Petero Civoniceva	2	0	0	8
Ben Hannant	2	0	0	8
Craig Frawley	2	0	0	8
Joel Moon	2	0/1	0	8
Shane Perry	2	0	0	8
Brad Thorn	2	0	0	8
Sam Thaiday	1	1/2	0	6
Denan Kemp	1	0	0	4
Nick Emmett	1	0	0	4
TOTAL	89	77/99	3	511
