= 2007 St. George Illawarra Dragons season =

- NRL rank: 13th
- 2007 record: Wins: 9; draws: 0; losses: 15
- Points scored: For: 509; against: 431

Team information
- Coach: Nathan Brown
- Captain: Jason Ryles, Ben Hornby
- Stadium: Jubilee Oval, Wollongong Showground
- Avg. attendance: 12,159
- High attendance: 19,051 (vs. Bulldogs, round 20)

Top scorers
- Tries: Matt Cooper (11)
- Goals: Jamie Soward (38)
- Points: Jamie Soward (105)
← 2006	2008 →

The 2007 St. George Illawarra Dragons season was the ninth in the joint venture club's history. The Dragons competed in the NRL's 2007 premiership season. The team finished thirteenth in the regular season, finishing the lowest they ever had and as a result of that, missing out on finals.

== Squad gains and losses ==
▲ or ▼	Player	2006 Club	2007 Club
▲	Tony Caine	Cronulla-Sutherland Sharks	St. George Illawarra Dragons
▲	Rangi Chase	Wests Tigers	St. George Illawarra Dragons
▲	Luke MacDougall	South Sydney Rabbitohs	St. George Illawarra Dragons
▲	Adam Peek	Parramatta Eels	St. George Illawarra Dragons
▲	Beau Scott	Cronulla-Sutherland Sharks	St. George Illawarra Dragons
▲	Jamie Soward	Sydney Roosters	St. George Illawarra Dragons
▲	Simon Woolford	Canberra Raiders	St. George Illawarra Dragons
▼	Luke Bailey	St. George Illawarra Dragons	Gold Coast Titans
▼	Trent Barrett	St. George Illawarra Dragons	Wigan Warriors (Super League)
▼	Colin Best	St. George Illawarra Dragons	Canberra Raiders
▼	Matt Bickerstaff	St. George Illawarra Dragons	Canberra Raiders
▼	Aaron Gorrell	St. George Illawarra Dragons	Catalans Dragons (Super League)
▼	Clint Greenshields	St. George Illawarra Dragons	Catalans Dragons (Super League)
▼	Michael Henderson	St. George Illawarra Dragons	Gold Coast Titans
▼	Daryl Millard	St. George Illawarra Dragons	Canterbury-Bankstown Bulldogs
▼	Andrew Price	St. George Illawarra Dragons	Retirement
▼	Reece Simmonds	St. George Illawarra Dragons	South Sydney Rabbitohs
▼	Lee Te Maari	St. George Illawarra Dragons	Canterbury-Bankstown Bulldogs
▼	Shaun Timmins	St. George Illawarra Dragons	Retirement

== Ladder ==
2007 NRL season
Pos	Team	Pld	W	D	L	B	PF	PA	PD	Pts
1	Melbourne Storm	24	21	0	3	1	627	277	+350	44
2	Manly-Warringah Sea Eagles	24	18	0	6	1	597	377	+220	38
3	North Queensland Cowboys	24	15	0	9	1	547	618	−71	32
4	New Zealand Warriors	24	13	1	10	1	593	434	+159	29
5	Parramatta Eels	24	13	0	11	1	573	481	+92	28
6	Canterbury-Bankstown Bulldogs	24	12	0	12	1	575	528	+47	26
7	South Sydney Rabbitohs	24	12	0	12	1	408	399	+9	26
8	Brisbane Broncos	24	11	0	13	1	511	476	+35	24
9	Wests Tigers	24	11	0	13	1	541	561	−20	24
10	Sydney Roosters	24	10	1	13	1	445	610	−165	23
11	Cronulla-Sutherland Sharks	24	10	0	14	1	463	403	+60	22
12	Gold Coast Titans	24	10	0	14	1	409	559	−150	22
13	St George Illawarra Dragons	24	9	0	15	1	431	509	−78	20
14	Canberra Raiders	24	9	0	15	1	522	652	−130	20
15	Newcastle Knights	24	9	0	15	1	418	708	−290	20
16	Penrith Panthers	24	8	0	16	1	539	607	−68	18

=== Ladder Progression ===
Round	1	2	3	4	5	6	7	8	9	10	11	12	13	14	15	16	17	18	19	20	21	22	23	24	25
Ladder Position	7th	10th	9th	13th	15th	14th	15th	13th	15th	14th	15th	14th	15th	16th	16th	14th	13th	14th	14th	15th	12th	13th	14th	13th	13th

== Season results ==
Round	Home	Score	Away	Match Information
Round	Home	Score	Away	Date	Venue	Referee	Attendance	Source
1	Gold Coast Titans	18 – 20	St. George Illawarra Dragons	18 March	Lang Park	Shayne Hayne	42,030
2	St. George Illawarra Dragons	12 – 16	Newcastle Knights	23 March	Jubilee Oval	Steve Clark	12,326
3	St. George Illawarra Dragons	18 – 22	North Queensland Cowboys	31 March	Wollongong Showground	Jared Maxwell	10,232
4	Cronulla-Sutherland Sharks	40 – 4	St. George Illawarra Dragons	9 April	Endeavour Field	Tony Archer	19,137
5	St. George Illawarra Dragons	10 – 24	Melbourne Storm	14 April	Jubilee Oval	Ben Cummins	9,011
6		BYE
7 (ANZAC Day)	Sydney Roosters	18 – 4	St. George Illawarra Dragons	25 April	Sydney Football Stadium	Paul Simpkins	18,240
8	St. George Illawarra Dragons	28 – 16	Penrith Panthers	4 May	Jubilee Oval	Sean Hampstead	9,057
9	Wests Tigers	27 – 8	St. George Illawarra Dragons	13 May	Stadium Australia	Ben Cummins	13,625
10	St. George Illawarra Dragons	28 – 10	Gold Coast Titans	18 May	Wollongong Showground	Tony Archer	12,085
11	Canberra Raiders	30 – 6	St. George Illawarra Dragons	25 May	Canberra Stadium	Steve Clark	13,187
12	St. George Illawarra Dragons	11 – 4	Brisbane Broncos	1 June	Jubilee Oval	Shayne Hayne	10,302
13	St. George Illawarra Dragons	16 – 20	Cronulla-Sutherland Sharks	11 June	Jubilee Oval	Tony Archer	12,455
14	Parramatta Eels	20 – 12	St. George Illawarra Dragons	17 June	Parramatta Stadium	Sean Hampstead	12,658
15	Melbourne Storm	28 – 6	St. George Illawarra Dragons	24 June	Olympic Park Stadium	Paul Simpkins	13,545
16	St. George Illawarra Dragons	26 – 22	Manly Warringah Sea Eagles	1 July	Jubilee Oval	Tony Archer	11,958
17	St. George Illawarra Dragons	58 – 16	Canberra Raiders	8 July	Wollongong Showground	Sean Hampstead	7,561
18	New Zealand Warriors	44 – 16	St. George Illawarra Dragons	15 July	Mount Smart Stadium	Jared Maxwell	10,037
19	Penrith Panthers	20 – 38	St. George Illawarra Dragons	21 July	Penrith Stadium	Gavin Badger	9,523
20	St. George Illawarra Dragons	24 – 28	Canterbury-Bankstown Bulldogs	28 July	Wollongong Showground	Ben Cummins	19,051
21	Newcastle Knights	4 – 20	St. George Illawarra Dragons	3 August	Newcastle International Sports Centre	Jared Maxwell	12,573
22	St. George Illawarra Dragons	14 – 24	South Sydney Rabbitohs	11 August	Wollongong Showground	Steve Clark	18,382
23	North Queensland Cowboys	24 – 14	St. George Illawarra Dragons	18 August	Willows Sports Complex	Ben Cummins	18,721
24	St. George Illawarra Dragons	14 – 6	Parramatta Eels	27 August	Wollongong Showground	Sean Hampstead	13,488
25	Manly Warringah Sea Eagles	28 – 24	St. George Illawarra Dragons	2 September	Brookvale Oval	Steve Clark	18,637
