= 2007 Wests Tigers season =

← 2006	2008 →

The 2007 Wests Tigers season was the 8th in the joint-venture club's history. They competed in the National Rugby League's 2007 Telstra Premiership, finishing in 9th position and failing to reach the play-offs.

== Season summary ==
The Wests Tigers had a poor start to the season, losing their first four matches (three of them by very narrow margins.) The Tigers finally won their first game of the season in Round 5 against Cronulla Sharks, at Campbelltown Stadium, by 2 points in golden point extra time. Although Benji Marshall again injured a shoulder in round 8, the Tigers continued winning through to round 12 when they lost to Parramatta by 30 points. Injuries to key players continued throughout the season - Benji Marshall out for eleven rounds, Brett Hodgson out for seven rounds with a fractured cheek, and Todd Payten, Paul Whatuira and Bryce Gibbs all missing several games.

After spending sixteen rounds in the top eight, the Tigers dropped down to ninth position when they lost to the South Sydney Rabbitohs in round 24. Facing the Newcastle Knights (a team desperate to avoid the wooden spoon in their own horror season) in the last match of the regular season, the Tigers needed to win and then hope the Broncos lost to the Eels to regain a position in the eight. Although they led twice in the game by a margin of twelve points, the Tigers' finished an inconsistent season on a disappointing loss to the Knights, 24–26 at Telstra Stadium, and in 9th position on the ladder.

== 2007 Season results ==
2007 Season Results
Round	Opponent	Result	Date	Venue	Crowd	Referee	Position/16
1	Melbourne Storm	Loss	16 March 2007	Olympic Park (A)	13,535	Sean Hampstead	10th
1	Melbourne Storm	18 - Storm (Tries: Jeremy Smith, Hoffman, Folau; Goals: Cameron Smith 3) 16 - Wests Tigers (Tries: Moodie, Harrison, Whatuira; Goals: Marshall 2)					10th
2	Manly Sea Eagles	Loss	24 March 2007	Leichhardt Oval (H)	15,185	Tony Archer	11th
2	Manly Sea Eagles	8 - Wests Tigers (Tries: Farah; Goals: Marshall 2) 19 - Sea Eagles (Tries: Watmough, Robertson, Haldon; Goals: Lyon 3; Field Goals: Monaghan)					11th
3	Parramatta Eels	Loss	30 March 2007	Parramatta Stadium (A)	18,142	Steve Clark	14th
3	Parramatta Eels	22 - Eels (Tries: Reddy, Tim Smith, Mateo; Goals: Burt 5) 20 - Wests Tigers (Tries: Galloway, Harrison, Marshall; Goals: Marshall 4) in golden point extra time.					14th
4	North Queensland Cowboys	Loss	7 April 2007	Dairy Farmers Stadium (A)	21,879	Jarred Maxwell	15th
4	North Queensland Cowboys	25 - Cowboys (Tries: Graham 2, Sweeney, Bowen; Goals: Thurston 4; Field Goals: Bowen) 24 - Wests Tigers (Tries: Fitzhenry, Farah, Collis, Whatuira; Goals: Marshall 4)					15th
5	Cronulla Sharks	Win	15 April 2007	Campbelltown Stadium (H)	17,566	Sean Hampstead	14th
5	Cronulla Sharks	14 - Wests Tigers (Tries: Fitzhenry, Marshall; Goals: Marshall 3) 12 - Sharks (Tries: Simmons, Bird; Goals: Covell 2) in golden point extra time.					14th
6	Bye						13th
7	Bulldogs	Win	27 April 2007	Telstra Stadium (A)	18,066	Shayne Hayne	9th
7	Bulldogs	18 - Bulldogs (Tries: Mason, Williams, El Masri; Goals: El Masri 3) 34 - Wests Tigers (Tries: Collis 2, Morris, Marshall, Fitzhenry, Heighington; Goals: Marshall 5)					9th
8	Melbourne Storm	Win	5 May 2007	Bluetongue Central Coast Stadium (H)	19,111	Tony Archer	7th
8	Melbourne Storm	30 - Wests Tigers (Tries: Lawrence 2, Farah, Galea; Goals: Collis 7) 12 - Storm (Tries: King, Johnson; Goals: Cameron Smith 2 )					7th
9	St George Illawarra Dragons	Win	13 May 2007	Telstra Stadium (H)	13,625	Ben Cummins	5th
9	St George Illawarra Dragons	27 - Wests Tigers (Tries: Fulton 2, Galea, Lawrence, Fitzhenry; Goals: Hodgson 3; Field Goals: Morris) 8 - Dragons (Tries: Stanley; Goals: Head 2)					5th
10	New Zealand Warriors	Win	20 May 2007	Mount Smart Stadium (A)	10,282	Steve Clark	4th
10	New Zealand Warriors	26 - Warriors (Tries: Vatuvei, Ropati, Mannering, Ah Van, Hohaia; Goals: Martin 3) 30 - Wests Tigers (Tries: Fulton, Te'o, Morris, Lawrence; Goals: Hodgson 3; Field Goals: Hodgson 7)					4th
11	Penrith Panthers	Win	27 May 2007	CUA Stadium (A)	17,337	Jarred Maxwell	3rd
11	Penrith Panthers	24 - Panthers (Tries: Frank Puletua, Gordon, Daniela, Youngquest; Goals: Gordon 2, Wallace 2) 25 - Wests Tigers (Tries: Fulton, Fitzhenry, Lawrence, Galea; Goals: Hodgson 4; Field Goals: Farah)					3rd
12	Parramatta Eels	Loss	4 June 2007	Telstra Stadium (H)	22,245	Ben Cummins	5th
12	Parramatta Eels	8 - Wests Tigers (Tries: Lawrence; Goals: Hodgson 2) 38 - Eels (Tries: Mateo 2, Grothe, Hayne, Finch, Ben Smith, Burt; Goals: Burt 5)					5th
13	Newcastle Knights	Win	10 June 2007	Energy Australia Stadium (A)	13,609	Sean Hampstead	3rd
13	Newcastle Knights	14 - Knights (Tries: Tighe 2, Paterson; Goals: Paterson) 33 - Wests Tigers (Tries: Farah, Heighington, Collis, Tuiaki, Fulton; Goals: Collis 6; Field Goals: Farah 1)					3rd
14	Gold Coast Titans	Loss	17 June 2007	Campbelltown Stadium (H)	13,451	Tony Archer	4th
14	Gold Coast Titans	14 - Wests Tigers (Tries: Whatuira, Lawrence, Tuiaki; Goals: Collis) 16 - Titans (Tries: Rogers 2, Lewis; Goals: Rogers 2)					4th
15	Brisbane Broncos	Loss	25 June 2007	Suncorp Stadium (A)	29,364	Shayne Hayne	6th
15	Brisbane Broncos	48 - Broncos (Tries: Hunt 3, Hodges 2, Lockyer, Carroll, Shaun Berrigan, Michaels; Goals: Parker 4, Ennis 2) 18 - Wests Tigers (Tries: Farah, Morris, Lawrence; Goals: Farah 3)					6th
16	Canberra Raiders	Win	1 July 2007	Canberra Stadium (A)	12,598	Steve Clark	5th
16	Canberra Raiders	16 - Raiders (Tries: Milne 2, Tilse; Goals: Carney 2) 22 - Wests Tigers (Tries: Whatuira 2, Morris, Lawrence; Goals: Farah 3)					5th
17	Penrith Panthers	Win	6 July 2007	Telstra Stadium (H)	12,395	Ben Cummins	5th
17	Penrith Panthers	43 - Wests Tigers (Tries: Lawrence 3, Payten 2, Flanagan, Ryan, Collis; Goals: Farah 5; Field Goals: Farah) 26 - Panthers (Tries: Pritchard 2, Wallace, Lewis; Goals: Youngquest 5)					5th
18	Manly Sea Eagles	Loss	13 July 2007	Brookvale Oval (A)	15,288	Steve Clark	6th
18	Manly Sea Eagles	34 - Sea Eagles (Tries: Menzies 2, Glen Stewart, Monaghan, Robertson, Bryant; Goals: Orford 5) 4 - Wests Tigers (Tries: Flanagan)					6th
19	New Zealand Warriors	Loss	22 July 2007	Campbelltown Stadium (H)	14,012	Paul Simpkins	8th
19	New Zealand Warriors	16 - Wests Tigers (Tries: Collis, Heighington, Lawrence, Tuiaki) 28 - Warriors (Tries: Rovelli 2, Ropati, Koopu, Luck; Goals: Witt 4)					8th
20	North Queensland Cowboys	Win	30 July 2007	Leichhardt Oval (H)	17,101	Shayne Hayne	7th
20	North Queensland Cowboys	54 - Wests Tigers (Tries: Harrison 2, Tuiaki, Morris, Hodgson, Heighington, Fitzhenry, Farah, Galea, Halatau; Goals: Hodgson 2, Marshall 4, Farah) 10 - Cowboys (Tries: Justin Smith, Bartlett; Goals: Thurston)					7th
21	Gold Coast Titans	Loss	4 August 2007	Carrara Stadium (A)	17,257	Steve Clark	8th
21	Gold Coast Titans	30 - Titans (Tries: Cooper, Webster, Delaney, Lewis, Laffranchi; Goals: Delaney 5) 14 - Wests Tigers (Tries: Tuiaki 2, Lawrence; Goals: Marshall)					8th
22	Sydney Roosters	Loss	10 August 2007	Telstra Stadium (H)	25,166	Tony Archer	8th
22	Sydney Roosters	22 - Wests Tigers (Tries: Farah, Fulton, Te'o; Goals: Marshall 5) 26 - Roosters (Tries: Monaghan 2, Roberts 2, Aubusson; Goals: Roberts 3) in golden point extra time.					8th
23	Cronulla Sharks	Win	18 August 2007	Toyota Park (A)	12,964	Paul Simpkins	7th
23	Cronulla Sharks	29 - Wests Tigers (Tries: Fitzhenry, Marshall, Tuiaki, Hodgson, Lawrence; Goals: Marshall 4; Field Goals: Farah) 28 - Sharks (Tries: Covell 2, Bird, Pomeroy, Taulapapa; Goals: Covell 4)					7th
24	South Sydney Rabbitohs	Loss	26 August 2007	Leichhardt Oval (H)	20,232	Tony Archer	9th
24	South Sydney Rabbitohs	12 - Wests Tigers (Tries: Fitzhenry, Tuiaki; Goals: Marshall 2) 37 - Rabbitohs (Tries: Gordon 2, Asotasi, J Smith, Sutton, Widders; Goals: Williams 6; Field Goals: Williams))					9th
25	Newcastle Knights	Loss	31 August 2007	Telstra Stadium (H)	13,446	Paul Simpkins	9th
25	Newcastle Knights	24 - Wests Tigers (Tries: Marshall 2, Morris, Lawrence; Goals: Marshall 4) 26 - Knights (Tries: Vuna 2, Paterson, Gidley; Goals: Gidley 5)					9th

== 2007 Season ladder ==
2007 NRL season
Pos	Team	Pld	W	D	L	B	PF	PA	PD	Pts
1	Melbourne Storm	24	21	0	3	1	627	277	+350	44
2	Manly-Warringah Sea Eagles	24	18	0	6	1	597	377	+220	38
3	North Queensland Cowboys	24	15	0	9	1	547	618	−71	32
4	New Zealand Warriors	24	13	1	10	1	593	434	+159	29
5	Parramatta Eels	24	13	0	11	1	573	481	+92	28
6	Canterbury-Bankstown Bulldogs	24	12	0	12	1	575	528	+47	26
7	South Sydney Rabbitohs	24	12	0	12	1	408	399	+9	26
8	Brisbane Broncos	24	11	0	13	1	511	476	+35	24
9	Wests Tigers	24	11	0	13	1	541	561	−20	24
10	Sydney Roosters	24	10	1	13	1	445	610	−165	23
11	Cronulla-Sutherland Sharks	24	10	0	14	1	463	403	+60	22
12	Gold Coast Titans	24	10	0	14	1	409	559	−150	22
13	St George Illawarra Dragons	24	9	0	15	1	431	509	−78	20
14	Canberra Raiders	24	9	0	15	1	522	652	−130	20
15	Newcastle Knights	24	9	0	15	1	418	708	−290	20
16	Penrith Panthers	24	8	0	16	1	539	607	−68	18

== Players Used ==
As at 22 July 2007:

No.

Position
Player

Brett Hodgson (captain) – FB Shannon McDonnell – FB Shannon Gallant – FB (Debut: Round 19) Daniel Fitzhenry – WG Jason Moodie – WG Beau Ryan – WG (Debut: Round 16) Taniela Tuiaki – WG Chris Lawrence – CE Dean Collis – CE Paul Whatuira – CE Danny Galea – CE (Debut: Round 8) Benji Marshall – FE John Morris – HB (Debut: Round 1)

No.

Position
Player

Bryce Gibbs – PR Ryan O'Hara – PR Todd Payten – PR Jarrod Saffy – PR Robbie Farah – HK Stuart Flanagan – HK Keith Galloway – SR Dene Halatau – SR Bronson Harrison – SR Ben Te'o – SR (Debut: Round 9) Liam Fulton – LK Ben Galea – LK Chris Heighington – LK

=== Gains and losses ===
2007 Player Movements
Gains		Losses	
Player	Previous club	Player	New Club
John Morris	Parramatta Eels	Jamahl Lolesi	Huddersfield Giants
Peter Lewis	Parramatta Eels	John Skandalis	Huddersfield Giants
Danny Galea	Penrith Panthers	Shane Elford	Huddersfield Giants
Tom Haberecht	St. George Illawarra Dragons	Anthony Laffranchi	Gold Coast Titans
Luke Harlen	Cronulla Sharks	Scott Prince	Gold Coast Titans
Jason Moodie	Cessnock	Sam Harris	NSW Waratahs
		Michael Crockett	New Zealand Warriors
		Isaac de Gois	Cronulla Sharks
		Rangi Chase	St. George Illawarra Dragons
