= 2007 Gold Coast Titans season =

Coordinates: 28°00′23″S 153°22′2″E

The 2007 Gold Coast Titans season was the first in the club's history. They competed in the NRL's 2007 Telstra Premiership, finishing the regular season 12th (out of 16).

At the end of the season Luke Bailey and Anthony Laffranchi were named co-winners of the club's inaugural Paul Broughton Medal for best and fairest player of 2007.

== Season summary ==
The Gold Coast Titans' first ever trial match resulted in a 32–6 loss to the previous season's grand finalists Melbourne Storm, however wins over the Parramatta Eels and Penrith Panthers later on led to predictions for a bright start to the Titans' premiership campaign.

Their first premiership match was played against the St. George Illawarra Dragons at Suncorp Stadium on 18 March. After at one stage leading, the Titans lost a cliffhanger, 20–18. But this disappointment was soon erased with the club registering its first ever win against Ricky Stuart's Cronulla-Sutherland Sharks at Carrara Stadium the following round.

There were mixed results in the first half of the season; highlights included wins over Preston Campbell's old club the Penrith Panthers at Penrith in round four, the Brisbane Broncos at Suncorp Stadium (a Titans home game) in round five in a match which was marred by a horrible leg injury to Michael Henderson and the virus-struck Parramatta Eels by 38–12 in round seven. The Parramatta side had blamed its loss to the Titans on its preparation of its squad whom at least half of them had been struck with illness in the week leading up to the match.

By round fifteen, everything seemed to be coming together. However, injuries to many players, none more so than captain Scott Prince, struck the Titans at the wrong end of the season and lost eight of its last ten matches (including a 56–10 loss to Canberra in round 18 and a final round 50–6 loss to the Melbourne Storm in Melbourne) to fall to 12th at the end of its inaugural season. Despite this, their first season was deemed not a failure but not a success either. Only wins over the Wests Tigers and Sydney Roosters, both at home, saved the Titans from a lower finish.

== Results ==
Round	Opponent	Result	Tit.	Opp.	Date	Venue	Crowd
Trial Match	Melbourne Storm	Loss	6	32	17 Feb	BCU International Stadium, Coffs Harbour, NSW	12,000
Trial Match	Parramatta Eels	Win	22	10	24 Feb	Oakes Oval	8,612
Trial Match	Penrith Panthers	Win	28	6	2 Mar	Carrara Stadium	13,457
1	St George Illawarra Dragons	Loss	18	20	18 Mar	Suncorp Stadium	42,030
2	Cronulla Sharks	Win	18	16	26 Mar	Carrara Stadium	17,946
3	Canterbury Bulldogs	Loss	6	22	1 Apr	Telstra Stadium	14,675
4	Penrith Panthers	Win	24	22	8 Apr	CUA Stadium	15,022
5	Brisbane Broncos	Win	28	16	13 Apr	Suncorp Stadium	27,686
6	Manly Sea Eagles	Loss	6	20	22 Apr	Brookvale Oval	25,524
7	Parramatta Eels	Win	38	12	29 Apr	Carrara Stadium	18,021
8	North Queensland Cowboys	Loss	10	24	7 May	Carrara Stadium	17,806
9	Sydney Roosters	Loss	18	24	13 May	Sydney Football Stadium	6,246
10	St George Illawarra Dragons	Loss	10	28	18 May	WIN Stadium	12,058
11	South Sydney Rabbitohs	Win	25	18	26 May	Carrara Stadium	17,266
12	Canberra Raiders	Win	28	8	3 Jun	Carrara Stadium	13,644
13	BYE	-	-	-	-	-	-
14	Wests Tigers	Win	16	14	17 Jun	Campbelltown Stadium	13,451
15	Newcastle Knights	Win	28	22	23 Jun	Carrara Stadium	15,306
16	New Zealand Warriors	Loss	6	22	30 June	Carrara Stadium	17,608
17	Brisbane Broncos	Loss	18	19	6 Jul	Suncorp Stadium	48,621
18	Canberra Raiders	Loss	10	56	15 Jul	Canberra Stadium	9,136
19	Canterbury Bulldogs	Loss	12	36	20 Jul	Carrara Stadium	15,873
20	South Sydney Rabbitohs	Loss	14	20	28 Jul	Telstra Stadium	13,351
21	Wests Tigers	Win	30	14	4 Aug	Carrara Stadium	17,257
22	New Zealand Warriors	Loss	6	30	11 Aug	Mt Smart Stadium	20,609
23	Sydney Roosters	Win	22	18	19 Aug	Carrara Stadium	17,423
24	Cronulla Sharks	Loss	12	28	25 Aug	Toyota Stadium	9,036
25	Melbourne Storm	Loss	6	50	2 Sep	Olympic Park	11,770

Round	Position
1	10/16
2	9/16
3	12/16
4	10/16
5	7/16
6	9/16
7	6/16
8	9/16
9	10/16
10	13/16
11	12/16
12	9/16
13	8/16
14	6/16
15	4/16
16	7/16
17	9/16
18	10/16
19	11/16
20	12/16
21	11/16
22	12/16
23	11/16
24	12/16
25	12/16
