= 2013 Mackay Cutters season =

- Queensland Cup rank: 2nd
- Play-off result: Premiers
- 2013 record: Wins: 14; draws: 2; losses: 6
- Points scored: For: 577; against: 483

Team information
- CEO: Glenn Ottaway
- Coach: Kim Williams
- Captain: Jardine Bobongie Joel Clinton
- Stadium: Virgin Australia Stadium

Top scorers
- Tries: Bureta Faraimo (17)
- Goals: Liam Taylor (63)
- Points: Liam Taylor (170)
← 2012	2014 →

The 2013 Mackay Cutters season was the sixth in the club's history. Coached by Kim Williams and captained by Jardine Bobongie and Joel Clinton, they competed in the QRL's Intrust Super Cup. The club enjoyed their most successful season, finishing the regular season in second place and defeating the Easts Tigers 27–20 in the Grand Final to win their first premiership.

== Season summary ==
After the departure of head coach Anthony Seibold at the end of 2012, the Cutters hired former Melbourne Storm SG Ball Cup coach Kim Williams as his replacement. The club's biggest off-season recruit was former Australian international and NRL premiership winning-prop Joel Clinton, who was returning to Australia after three seasons with Hull Kingston Rovers. He was named co-captain of the club, alongside veteran Jardine Bobongie.

On 28 April 2013, just hours after a 22–22 draw with the Tweed Heads Seagulls, North Queensland Cowboys contracted hooker Alex Elisala was found unconscious and not breathing after jumping from a hotel balcony. He died in hospital the following day. In honour of Elisala, the Cutters retired his number 14 jersey for the rest of the season. Despite the tragedy, the Cutters pushed forward and finished the season in second on the ladder, their highest ever finish (as of the 2019 season). In Week 1 of the finals, they suffered a 18–31 loss to the Easts Tigers before bouncing back to defeat the Ipswich Jets and Northern Pride to qualify for their first Grand Final and set up a rematch with the Tigers.

On 28 September 2013, the Cutters defeated Easts 27–20 in the Grand Final at North Ipswich Reserve to claim their maiden Queensland Cup premiership. Prop Tyson Andrews was named the club's Player of the Year, while Cowboys contracted players, Sam Hoare and Curtis Rona, were selected for the Queensland Residents side.

== Squad List ==
=== 2013 squad ===
Mackay Cutters
First team squad			Coaching staff
Tyson Andrews – PR; Jardine Bobongie (c) – LK; Jack Clark – SR; Joel Clinton (c) – PR; Michael Comerford – CE; Matt Constantinou – PR; Jake Cooley – PR; Zac Dalton – PR; Karl Davies – PR; Delane Edwards – FE; Aaron Fairweather – CE	Bureta Faraimo – WG; Daniel Faumuina – SR; Andrew Gay – CE; Chris Gesch – SR; Michael Koko – CE; Sam Miles – CE; David Milne – FB; Matt Minto – HB; Grant Moore – SR; Dan Murphy – FE; Kelvin Nielsen – SR	Dave Petersen – HK; Jason Schirnack – SR; Liam Taylor – FB; Jake Thompson – SR; Chris Ulugia – CE; Pulou Vaituutuu – PR; Dean Webster – CE; Lee Williams – CE; Luke Young – CE	Head coach: Kim Williams; Legend: (c) Captain(s); (vc) Vice-captain(s)

The following players contracted to the North Queensland Cowboys played for the Cutters in 2013: Alex Elisala, Kalifa Faifai Loa, Clint Greenshields, Chris Grevsmuhl, Sam Hoare, Rory Kostjasyn, Tyson Martin, Anthony Mitchell, Michael Morgan, Curtis Rona, Zac Santo, Tariq Sims and Jason Taumalolo.

== Squad movement ==
=== Gains ===
Player	Signed from	Until end of	Notes
Joel Clinton	Hull Kingston Rovers	2013	
Matt Constantinou	Melbourne Storm	2013	
Jake Cooley	Nelson Bays RU	2013	
Karl Davies	Melbourne Storm	2013	
Delane Edwards	Fremantle Roosters	2013	
Michael Koko	Melbourne Storm	2013	
Sam Miles	Emerald Tigers	2013	
Dan Murphy	Warwick Cowboys	2013	
Jason Netherton	Hull Kingston Rovers	2013	
Dave Petersen	Hull Kingston Rovers	2013	
Chris Ulugia	Parramatta Eels (mid-season)	2013	
Pulou Vaituutuu	Mounties RLFC	2013	

=== Losses ===
Player	Signed To	Until end of	Notes
Rohan Ahern	Released	–	
Lewis Balcomb	Retired	–	
Neil Budworth	Retired	–	
Trevor Exton	Released	–	
Luke Fatnowna	Retired	–	
Damon Koolstra	Easts Tigers	2013	
Jason Netherton	Hull KR (mid-season)	2013	
Grant Rovelli	Souths Sharks Mackay	2013	
Michael Thomas	Easts Tigers	2013	
Andrew Ward	Released	–	

== Fixtures ==
=== Regular season ===
Date	Round	Opponent	Venue	Score	Tries	Goals
Saturday, 16 March	Round 1	Northern Pride	Barlow Park	12 – 44	Bobongie, Milne	Taylor (2)
Saturday, 23 March	Round 2	CQ Capras	Virgin Australia Stadium	38 – 12	Greenshields (2), Rona (2), Elisala, Faraimo, Milne	Faifai Loa (5)
Sunday, 31 March	Round 3	Wynnum Manly Seagulls	BMD Kougari Oval	10 – 36	Faraimo, Taylor	Taylor (1)
Saturday, 6 April	Round 4	Easts Tigers	Virgin Australia Stadium	14 – 6	Morgan (2), Milne	Taylor (1)
Sunday, 14 April	Round 5	Redcliffe Dolphins	Dolphin Oval	34 – 18	Comerford, Faifai Loa, Faraimo, Hoare, Rona	Taylor (5)
Saturday, 20 April	Round 6	Norths Devils	Virgin Australia Stadium	34 – 16	Faraimo (2), Milne, Rona, Webster	Taylor (5)
Saturday, 27 April	Round 7	Tweed Heads Seagulls	Virgin Australia Stadium	22 – 22	Andrews, Elisala, Milne, Rona	Taylor (3)
	Round 8	Bye				
Saturday, 11 May	Round 9	Wynnum Manly Seagulls	Virgin Australia Stadium	20 – 12	Faifai Loa (2), Andrews, Hoare	Taylor (2)
Sunday, 19 May	Round 10	Souths Logan Magpies	Davies Park	22 – 23	Taumalolo (3), Gesch, Rona	Taylor (1)
Sunday, 26 May	Round 11	Burleigh Bears	Pizzey Park	42 – 24	Rona (2), Greenshields, Faifai Loa, Faraimo, Martin, Taylor, Webster	Taylor (5)
Sunday, 1 June	Round 12	Ipswich Jets	Virgin Australia Stadium	16 – 28	Rona (2), Milne	Taylor (2)
Saturday, 8 June	Round 13	Redcliffe Dolphins	Virgin Australia Stadium	26 – 20	Grevsmuhl, Kostjasyn, Milne, Rona	Minto (5)
	Round 14	Bye				
Saturday, 23 June	Round 15	Easts Tigers	Langlands Park	16 – 40	Milne, Rona, Taumalolo	Taylor (2)
Saturday, 29 June	Round 16	Ipswich Jets	North Ipswich Reserve	20 – 18	Faifai Loa, Gesch, Minto, Taylor	Taylor (2)
Saturday, 6 July	Round 17	Northern Pride	Virgin Australia Stadium	26 – 16	Faraimo, Hoare, Mitchell, Morgan, Taylor	Taylor (2), Faifai Loa (1)
Saturday, 20 July	Round 18	Sunshine Coast Sea Eagles	Moranbah	38 – 18	Faraimo (2), Minto (2), Bobongie, Milne, Taylor	Taylor (5)
Saturday, 27 July	Round 19	Burleigh Bears	Virgin Australia Stadium	26 – 26	Bobongie, Milne, Taylor, Taumalolo, Ulugia	Taylor (3)
Saturday, 3 August	Round 20	Norths Devils	Green Energy Sports Park	38 – 24	Milne (3), Faraimo, Martin, Mitchell, Webster	Minto (5)
Saturday, 10 August	Round 21	Souths Logan Magpies	Virgin Australia Stadium	12 – 22	Mitchell, Morgan	Taylor (2)
Saturday, 17 August	Round 22	CQ Capras	Browne Park	34 – 28	Faifai Loa, Faraimo, Gesch, Minto, Morgan, Taylor	Taylor (5)
Sunday, 25 August	Round 23	Tweed Heads Seagulls	Piggabeen Sports Complex	41 – 24	Gesch, Minto, Mitchell, Morgan, Taumalolo, Taylor	Taylor (6), Bobongie (1), Minto (1, 1 FG)
Saturday, 31 August	Round 24	Sunshine Coast Sea Eagles	Virgin Australia Stadium	36 – 6	Andrews, Faifai Loa, Faraimo, Milne, Morgan, Murphy, Taumalolo	Minto (4)
Legend: Win Loss Draw Bye

=== Finals ===
Date	Round	Opponent	Venue	Score	Tries	Goals
Sunday, 8 September	Elimination Final	Easts Tigers	Virgin Australia Stadium	18 – 31	Koko (2), Hoare	Taylor (3)
Saturday, 14 September	Semi Final	Ipswich Jets	Virgin Australia Stadium	27 – 16	Faraimo (2), Faifai Loa, Taylor	Taylor (3), Minto (2, 1 FG)
Sunday, 22 September	Preliminary Final	Northern Pride	Langlands Park	20 – 16	Faifai Loa, Faraimo, Taumalolo, Taylor	Taylor (2)
Sunday, 29 September	Grand Final	Easts Tigers	North Ipswich Reserve	27 – 20	Faraimo (2), Milne, Mitchell, Morgan	Milne (1), Minto (1, 1 FG), Taylor (1)
Legend: Win Loss Draw Bye

Mackay Cutters' Grand Final winning side: 1 Liam Taylor, 2 Bureta Faraimo, 15 Michael Morgan, 4 Kalifa Faifai Loa, 5 David Milne, 6 Dan Murphy, 7 Matt Minto, 8 Tyson Andrews, 9 Anthony Mitchell, 10 Sam Hoare, 17 Jason Taumalolo, 12 Chris Gesch, 13 Jardine Bobongie (c). Interchange: 11 Dean Webster, 16 Karl Davies, 18 Kelvin Nielsen, 20 Jason Schirnack. Coach: Kim Williams.

== Statistics ==
*	Denotes player contracted to the North Queensland Cowboys for the 2013 season

Name	T	G	FG	Pts
Tyson Andrews	3	-	-	12
Jardine Bobongie	3	1	-	14
Michael Comerford	1	-	-	4
Alex Elisala	2	-	-	8
Kalifa Faifai Loa	9	6	-	48
Bureta Faraimo	17	-	-	68
Chris Gesch	4	-	-	16
Clint Greenshields	3	-	-	12
Chris Grevsmuhl	1	-	-	4
Sam Hoare	4	-	-	16
Michael Koko	2	-	-	8
Rory Kostjasyn	1	-	-	4
Tyson Martin	2	-	-	8
David Milne	16	1	-	66
Matt Minto	5	18	3	59
Anthony Mitchell	5	-	-	20
Michael Morgan	8	-	-	32
Dan Murphy	1	-	-	4
Curtis Rona	12	-	-	48
Jason Taumalolo	8	-	-	32
Liam Taylor	11	63	-	170
Chris Ulugia	1	-	-	4
Dean Webster	3	-	-	12
Totals	122	89	3	669

== Honours ==
=== Club ===
- Player of the Year: Tyson Andrews
- Players' Player: Bureta Faraimo
- Sponsor's Player of the Year: Jardine Bobongie
- Rookie of the Year: Karl Davies
- Club Person of the Year: Chris Fraser
