= 2014 Mackay Cutters season =

- Queensland Cup rank: 9th
- Play-off result: Missed finals
- 2014 record: Wins: 11; draws: 0; losses: 13
- Points scored: For: 472; against: 546

Team information
- CEO: Glenn Ottaway
- Coach: Kim Williams
- Captain: Tyson Martin
- Stadium: Stadium Mackay

Top scorers
- Tries: Liam Taylor (13)
- Goals: Liam Taylor (52)
- Points: Liam Taylor (156)
← 2013	2015 →

The 2014 Mackay Cutters season was the seventh in the club's history. Coached by Kim Williams and captained by Tyson Martin, they competed in the QRL's Intrust Super Cup. The club were unable to defend their premiership, finishing ninth and missing the finals.

== Season summary ==
The Cutters faced an uphill struggle to win back-to-back premierships after losing a number of their 2013 Grand Final-winning side. Tyson Andrews, Bureta Faraimo and Matt Minto were all signed by NRL clubs, captain Jardine Bobongie returned to local rugby league, while North Queensland Cowboys players Michael Morgan and Jason Taumalolo became regular first graders. Tyson Martin returned to the club full-time after being released by the Cowboys and was named the club's captain.

The Cutters won 11 of their 24 games, finishing ninth. Cowboys-contracted fullback Zac Santo was named the club's Player of the Year at the end of the season.

== Squad List ==
=== 2014 squad ===
Mackay Cutters
First team squad			Coaching staff
Rohan Ahern – SR; Dan Beasley – PR; Ross Bella – PR; Josh Benjamin – CE; Hayden Crockett – CE; Zac Dalton – PR; Karl Davies – PR; Mitch Day – HK; Aaron Fairweather – CE; Aleki Falepaini – LK; Andrew Gay – CE	Chris Gesch – SR; Doug Hewitt – FE; Ryan Kinlyside – PR; Michael Koko – CE; Tyson Martin (c) – CE; Nicholas Mataia – CE; Dan Murphy – FE; Kelvin Nielsen – SR; Josh Osborne – PR; Dave Petersen – HK; Tom Rouse – HB	Jason Schirnack – SR; Justin Tavae – WG; Liam Taylor – FB; James Uhatafe – WG; Chris Ulugia – CE; Luke Vaccaneo – FB; Pulou Vaituutuu – PR; Brentt Warr – FE; Dean Webster – CE; Lee Williams – CE	Head coach: Kim Williams; Legend: (c) Captain(s); (vc) Vice-captain(s)

== Squad movement ==
=== Gains ===
Player	Signed from	Until end of	Notes
Rohan Ahern	Year off	2014	
Dan Beasley	Norths Devils	2014	
Josh Benjamin	CQ Capras	2014	
Hayden Crockett	Canberra Raiders	2014	
Mitch Day	Queanbeyan Blues	2014	
Doug Hewitt	Penrith Panthers	2014	
Tyson Martin	North Queensland Cowboys	2014	
Nicholas Mataia	Windsor Wolves	2014	
Tom Rouse	Newcastle Knights	2014	
Justin Tavae	Melbourne Storm	2014	
James Uhatafe	Cabramatta Two Blues	2014	
Brentt Warr	Easts Tigers	2014	

=== Losses ===
Player	Signed To	Until end of	Notes
Tyson Andrews	Manly Warringah Sea Eagles	2014	
Jardine Bobongie	Wests Tigers Mackay	2014	
Joel Clinton	Retired	–	
Michael Comerford	Retired	–	
Matt Constantinou	Sunbury Tigers	2014	
Delane Edwards	Fremantle Roosters	2014	
Bureta Faraimo	Parramatta Eels	2014	
Daniel Faumuina	Redcliffe Dolphins	2014	
David Milne	Retired	–	
Matt Minto	Newcastle Knights	2014	
Luke Young	Wests Tigers Mackay	2014	

== Fixtures ==
=== Regular season ===
Date	Round	Opponent	Venue	Score	Tries	Goals
Saturday, 1 March	Round 1	Easts Tigers	Stadium Mackay	12 – 40	Hewitt, Tavae	Taylor (2)
Saturday, 8 March	Round 2	PNG Hunters	Kalabond Oval	16 – 24	Beasley, Martin, Murphy	Taylor (2)
	Round 3	Bye				
Saturday, 22 March	Round 4	Wynnum Manly Seagulls	Stadium Mackay	12 – 4	Gesch, Petersen	Taylor (2)
Sunday, 30 March	Round 5	Norths Devils	Bishop Park	10 – 30	Benjamin, Hewitt	Taylor (1)
Saturday, 5 April	Round 6	Tweed Heads Seagulls	Stadium Mackay	8 – 12	Santo, Ulugia	
Sunday, 13 April	Round 7	Burleigh Bears	Pizzey Park	14 – 22	Hall, Rona, Ulugia	Taylor (1)
Saturday, 19 April	Round 8	Redcliffe Dolphins	Stadium Mackay	22 – 12	Santo, Schirnack, Tavae, Uhatafe, Ulugia	Asiata (1)
Friday, 25 April	Round 9	CQ Capras	Browne Park	34 – 28	Taylor (2), Gesch, Hoare, Martin, Warr	Taylor (5)
Saturday, 3 May	Round 10	Northern Pride	Barlow Park	18 – 22	Asiata (2), Santo, Taylor	Taylor (1)
Saturday, 10 May	Round 11	Sunshine Coast Falcons	Stadium Mackay	22 – 12	Benjamin, Day, Hoare, Taylor	Taylor (3)
Sunday, 18 May	Round 12	Souths Logan Magpies	Davies Park	22 – 42	Asiata, Hewitt, Hoare, Taylor	Taylor (3)
Sunday, 25 May	Round 13	Ipswich Jets	Stadium Mackay	12 – 36	Santo, Ulugia	Taylor (2)
Sunday, 1 June	Round 14	Easts Tigers	Langlands Park	14 – 22	Taylor (2), Tavae	Taylor (1)
Sunday, 8 June	Round 15	Wynnum Manly Seagulls	BMD Kougari Oval	18 – 16	Rona (2), Gesch	Taylor (3)
Saturday, 14 June	Round 16	PNG Hunters	Stadium Mackay	20 – 4	Taylor (2), Day, Mitchell	Taylor (2)
	Round 17	Bye				
Saturday, 28 June	Round 18	Norths Devils	Stadium Mackay	28 – 4	Ulugia (2), Murphy, Santo, Warr	Taylor (4)
Saturday, 12 July	Round 19	Burleigh Bears	Stadium Mackay	20 – 28	Tavae (2), Hewitt, Santo	Taylor (2)
Saturday, 19 July	Round 20	Souths Logan Magpies	Stadium Mackay	24 – 22	Taylor (2), Tavae, Ulugia	Taylor (4)
Sunday, 27 July	Round 21	Redcliffe Dolphins	Dolphin Oval	30 – 20	Osborne (2), Mitchell, Santo, Tavae	Taylor (5)
Saturday, 2 August	Round 22	Ipswich Jets	North Ipswich Reserve	10 – 62	Asiata, Rona	Taylor (1)
Saturday, 9 August	Round 23	Sunshine Coast Falcons	Daryl Burke Oval	28 – 20	Hewitt (2), Utahafe (2), Mitchell	Santo (4)
Saturday, 16 August	Round 24	Northern Pride	Stadium Mackay	16 – 18	Day, Santo, Taylor	Taylor (2)
Saturday, 23 August	Round 25	CQ Capras	Stadium Mackay	40 – 20	Rona (2), Tavae (2), Asiata, Gesch, Santo	Taylor (6)
Sunday, 31 August	Round 26	Tweed Heads Seagulls	Piggabeen Sports Complex	22 – 26	Davies, Gesch, Mataia, Rona, Santo	Warr (1)
Legend: Win Loss Draw Bye

== Statistics ==
Denotes player contracted to the North Queensland Cowboys for the 2014 season

Name	App	T	G	FG	Pts
Rohan Ahern	10	-	-	-	-
John Asiata	18	5	1	-	22
Dan Beasley	15	1	-	-	4
Ross Bella	2	-	-	-	-
Josh Benjamin	14	2	-	-	8
Zac Dalton	1	-	-	-	-
Karl Davies	23	1	-	-	4
Mitch Day	18	3	-	-	12
Aleki Falepaini	15	-	-	-	-
Chris Gesch	23	5	-	-	20
Glenn Hall	2	1	-	-	4
Doug Hewitt	20	6	-	-	24
Sam Hoare	16	3	-	-	12
Ryan Kinlyside	8	-	-	-	-
Michael Koko	1	-	-	-	-
Tyson Martin	12	2	-	-	8
Nicholas Mataia	7	1	-	-	4
Anthony Mitchell	18	3	-	-	12
Dan Murphy	7	2	-	-	8
Kelvin Nielsen	20	-	-	-	-
Josh Osborne	9	2	-	-	8
Dave Petersen	12	1	-	-	4
Curtis Rona	13	7	-	-	28
Tom Rouse	8	-	-	-	-
Zac Santo	22	10	4	-	48
Jason Schirnack	11	1	-	-	4
Justin Tavae	14	8	-	-	32
Liam Taylor	22	13	52	-	156
James Uhatafe	7	3	-	-	12
Chris Ulugia	14	7	-	-	28
Pulou Vaituutuu	3	-	-	-	-
Brentt Warr	19	2	1	-	10
Dean Webster	4	-	-	-	-
Totals		89	58	0	472

== Honours ==
=== Club ===
- Player of the Year: Zac Santo
- Players' Player: Dan Beasley
- Sponsor's Player of the Year: Dan Beasley
- Rookie of the Year: Mitch Day
- Spirit of the Cutters award: Chris Gesch
- Club Person of the Year: Ben Miles
