= 2012 Mackay Cutters season =

- Queensland Cup rank: 8th
- Play-off result: Missed finals
- 2012 record: Wins: 10; draws: 0; losses: 12
- Points scored: For: 488; against: 544

Team information
- CEO: Glenn Ottaway
- Coach: Anthony Seibold
- Captain: Grant Rovelli
- Stadium: Virgin Australia Stadium

Top scorers
- Tries: Grant Rovelli (9)
- Goals: Liam Taylor (36)
- Points: Liam Taylor (104)
← 2011	2013 →

The 2012 Mackay Cutters season was the fifth in the club's history. Coached by Anthony Seibold and captained by Grant Rovelli, they competed in the QRL's Intrust Super Cup. The club missed the finals for the second consecutive season, finishing eighth.

== Season summary ==
The Cutters welcomed former NRL players David Milne, Rohan Ahern and Jason Schirnack, and Welsh internationals Andrew Gay and Lee Williams to the club in 2012, as they looked to return to the finals. Unfortunately, despite winning more games than in 2011, success evaded the club once again, as they finished the season in eighth, missing the finals. Captain Grant Rovelli was named the club's Player of the Year, finishing as their top try scorer, and was once again selected for the Queensland Residents, captaining the side.

2012 would be head coach Anthony Seibold's final year at the club, as he joined the Melbourne Storm in 2013 to coach their under-20 side.

== Squad List ==
=== 2012 squad ===
Mackay Cutters
First team squad			Coaching staff
Rohan Ahern – SR; Tyson Andrews – PR; Lewis Balcomb – PR; Jardine Bobongie – LK; Neil Budworth – HK; Jack Clark – SR; Michael Comerford – CE; Zac Dalton – PR; Aidan Day – PR; Trevor Exton – SR; Aaron Fairweather – CE	Bureta Faraimo – WG; Luke Fatnowna – PR; Andrew Gay – CE; Chris Gesch – SR; Chad Grintell – CE; Damon Koolstra – HB; David Milne – FB; Matt Minto – HB; Grant Moore – SR; Kelvin Nielsen – SR; Grant Rovelli (c) – FE	Jason Schirnack – SR; Dylan Smith – PR; Dean Tass – FB; Liam Taylor – FB; Michael Thomas – WG; Andrew Ward – PR; Dean Webster – CE; Lee Williams – CE, SR; Luke Young – CE	Head coach: Anthony Seibold; Legend: (c) Captain(s); (vc) Vice-captain(s)

The following players contracted to the North Queensland Cowboys played for the Cutters in 2012: Javid Bowen, Chris Grevsmuhl, Glenn Hall, Sam Hoare, Dane Hogan, Ben Jones, Tyson Martin, Michael Morgan, Mosese Pangai, Jack Rycen, Jason Taumalolo and Francis Veukiso.

== Squad movement ==
=== Gains ===
Player	Signed From	Until End of	Notes
Rohan Ahern	Brisbane Broncos	2012	
Aidan Day	Northern Pride	2012	
Trevor Exton	Norths Devils (mid-season)	2012	
Aaron Fairweather	Gold Coast Titans	2012	
Andrew Gay	South Wales Scorpions	2012	
Chris Gesch	Central Queensland Capras	2012	
David Milne	Canberra Raiders	2012	
Matt Minto	Easts Tigers	2012	
Jason Schirnack	Wests Tigers	2012	
Dylan Smith	North Queensland Cowboys	2012	
Michael Thomas	Canberra Raiders	2012	
Dean Webster	North Sydney Bears	2012	
Lee Williams	Celtic Crusaders	2012	

=== Losses ===
Player	Signed To	Until End of	Notes
Janan Billings	Coaching	–	
Peter Gallen	Sunshine Coast Sea Eagles	2012	
Chris Giumelli	Retired	–	
Darren Griffiths	Burleigh Bears	2012	
Peter Hassall	Released	–	
Michael Meigan	Retired	–	
Kailem Perkins	Newcastle Knights	2012	
Peter Quinn	Released	–	
Liam Roach	Manly Warringah Sea Eagles	2012	
Todd Seymour	Burleigh Bears	2012	

== Fixtures ==
=== Regular season ===
Date	Round	Opponent	Venue	Score	Tries	Goals
Sunday, 11 March	Round 1	Redcliffe Dolphins	Dolphin Oval	18 – 28	Nielsen, Morgan, Pangai	Comerford (3)
Saturday, 17 March	Round 2	Northern Pride	Virgin Australia Stadium	6 – 14	Rovelli	Comerford (1)
Saturday, 24 March	Round 3	Norths Devils	Virgin Australia Stadium	30 – 28	Morgan (2), Hogan, Rovelli, Thomas	Minto (5)
Saturday, 31 March	Round 4	Tweed Heads Seagulls	Virgin Australia Stadium	24 – 36	Faraimo, Taylor, Martin, Rovelli	Minto (4)
Saturday, 7 April	Round 5	Burleigh Bears	Pizzey Park	26 – 12	Bobongie, Martin, Minto, Rovelli, Williams	Minto (3)
Sunday, 22 April	Round 6	Easts Tigers	Langlands Park	34 – 20	Hogan, Bobongie, Minto, Taylor, Thomas	Minto (5)
Friday, 27 April	Round 7	CQ Capras	Virgin Australia Stadium	42 – 12	Thomas (3), Milne (2), Andrews, Morgan, Luke Young	Minto (5)
Sunday, 6 May	Round 8	Souths Logan Magpies	Davies Park	24 – 12	Thomas (2), Balcomb, Glenn Hall, Rovelli	Minto (2)
Saturday, 12 May	Round 9	Ipswich Jets	Virgin Australia Stadium	10 – 32	Pangai, Taylor	Taylor (1)
Sunday, 20 May	Round 10	Sunshine Coast Sea Eagles	Sunshine Coast Stadium	36 – 10	Jones (2), Taylor (2), Hogan, Milne, Minto	Taylor (4)
Sunday, 27 May	Round 11	Wynnum Manly Seagulls	BMD Kougari Oval	6 – 48	Pangai	Taylor (1)
Saturday, 2 June	Round 12	Redcliffe Dolphins	Virgin Australia Stadium	28 – 32	Bobongie (2), Pangai (2), Morgan	Taylor (3), Minto (1)
Sunday, 10 June	Round 13	Northern Pride	Barlow Park	10 – 36	Minto, Rovelli	Taylor (1)
Friday, 15 June	Round 14	Ipswich Jets	North Ipswich Reserve	10 – 14	Faraimo, Taylor	Taylor (1)
Sunday, 24 June	Round 15	Easts Tigers	Virgin Australia Stadium	10 – 36	Pangai, Williams	Taylor (1)
Sunday, 8 July	Round 16	Burleigh Bears	Virgin Australia Stadium	22 – 12	Milne, Schirnack, Taylor, Thomas	Taylor (3)
Saturday, 14 July	Round 17	Tweed Heads Seagulls	Moranbah	22 – 28	Bobongie, Faraimo, Nielsen, Gay	Taylor (3)
Sunday, 22 July	Round 18	CQ Capras	Browne Park	24 – 20	Bobongie, Jones, Pangai, Rovelli	Taylor (4)
Sunday, 5 August	Round 19	Souths Logan Magpies	Virgin Australia Stadium	40 – 20	Jones (3), Minto (2), Faraimo, Rovelli	Taylor (6)
Saturday, 11 August	Round 20	Sunshine Coast Sea Eagles	Virgin Australia Stadium	36 – 22	Faraimo (2), Bobongie, Minto, Rovelli, Schirnack	Taylor (6)
Sunday, 19 August	Round 21	Norths Devils	Bishop Park	24 – 40	Faraimo (2), Gay, Minto, Taylor	Taylor (2)
Saturday, 25 August	Round 22	Wynnum Manly Seagulls	Virgin Australia Stadium	6 – 32	Koolstra	Koolstra (1)
Legend: Win Loss Draw Bye

== Statistics ==
*	Denotes player contracted to the North Queensland Cowboys for the 2012 season

Name	T	G	FG	Pts
Tyson Andrews	1	-	-	4
Lewis Balcomb	1	-	-	4
Jardine Bobongie	7	-	-	28
Michael Comerford	-	4	-	8
Bureta Faraimo	8	-	-	32
Andrew Gay	2	-	-	8
Glenn Hall	1	-	-	4
Dane Hogan	4	-	-	16
Ben Jones	6	-	-	24
Damon Koolstra	1	1	-	6
Tyson Martin	2	-	-	8
David Milne	4	-	-	16
Matt Minto	8	25	-	82
Michael Morgan	5	-	-	20
Kelvin Nielsen	2	-	-	8
Mosese Pangai	7	-	-	28
Grant Rovelli	9	-	-	36
Jason Schirnack	2	-	-	8
Liam Taylor	8	36	-	104
Michael Thomas	8	-	-	32
Lee Williams	2	-	-	8
Luke Young	1	-	-	4
Totals	89	66	0	488

== Honours ==
=== Club ===
- Player of the Year: Grant Rovelli
- Sponsor's Player of the Year: Grant Rovelli
- Most Consistent: Jardine Bobongie
- Rookie of the Year: Tyson Andrews
- Club Person of the Year: Kerri Proctor
