= 2013 Queensland Cup =

- Duration: March 16 – September 29, 2013
- Teams: 12
- Premiers: Mackay Cutters (1st title)
- Minor premiers: Northern Pride (1st title)
- Matches played: 138
- Points scored: 6,310
- Top points scorer(s): Cody Walker (171)
- Player of the year: Cody Walker (Courier Mail Medal)
- Top try-scorer(s): Davin Crampton (18)

The 2013 Queensland Cup season was the 18th season of Queensland's top-level statewide rugby league competition run by the Queensland Rugby League. The competition, known as the Intrust Super Cup due to sponsorship from Intrust Super, featured 12 teams playing a 26-week long season (including finals) from March to September.

The Mackay Cutters won their first premiership after defeating the Easts Tigers 27–20 in the Grand Final at North Ipswich Reserve. Easts Tigers' five-eighth Cody Walker was named the competition's Player of the Year, winning the Courier Mail Medal.

== Teams ==
In 2013, the lineup of teams remained unchanged for the fifth consecutive year. After partnering with the Gold Coast Titans since 2007, the Ipswich Jets became an affiliate of the Brisbane Broncos.

Colours	Club	Home ground(s)	Head coach(es)	Captain(s)	NRL affiliate
	Burleigh Bears	Pizzey Park	Carl Briggs	Darren Griffiths	Gold Coast Titans
	Central Queensland Capras	Browne Park	Jason Hetherington	Gavin Hiscox	Brisbane Broncos
	Easts Tigers	Langlands Park	Craig Ingebrigtsen	Steven Thorpe	Melbourne Storm
	Ipswich Jets	North Ipswich Reserve	Ben & Shane Walker	Keiron Lander	Brisbane Broncos
	Mackay Cutters	Virgin Australia Stadium	Kim Williams	Jardine Bobongie & Joel Clinton	North Queensland Cowboys
	Northern Pride	Barlow Park	Jason Demetriou	Ty Williams	North Queensland Cowboys
	Norths Devils	Bishop Park	Andrew Wynyard	Matt Smith	Brisbane Broncos
	Redcliffe Dolphins	Dolphin Oval	John Dixon	Petero Civoniceva	Brisbane Broncos
	Souths Logan Magpies	Davies Park	Mark Beaumont	Phil Dennis	None
	Sunshine Coast Sea Eagles	Sunshine Coast Stadium	Dave Cordwell	Callum Klein	None
	Tweed Heads Seagulls	Piggabeen Sports Complex	Aaron Zimmerle	Matt King & James Wood	Gold Coast Titans
	Wynnum Manly Seagulls	BMD Kougari Oval	Graham Murray → Jon Buchanan	Luke Dalziel-Don	Brisbane Broncos

== Ladder ==
2013 Queensland Cup
Pos	Team	Pld	W	D	L	B	PF	PA	PD	Pts
1	Northern Pride	22	17	0	5	2	703	296	+407	38
2	Mackay Cutters (P)	22	14	2	6	2	577	483	+94	34
3	Easts Tigers	22	13	0	9	2	628	371	+257	30
4	Wynnum Manly Seagulls	22	13	0	9	2	521	452	+69	30
5	Ipswich Jets	22	12	1	9	2	494	520	-26	29
6	Norths Devils	22	11	2	9	2	507	571	-64	28
7	Redcliffe Dolphins	22	10	3	9	2	537	413	+124	27
8	Tweed Heads Seagulls	22	11	1	10	2	458	494	-36	27
9	Souths Logan Magpies	22	11	0	11	2	415	554	-139	26
10	Central Queensland Capras	22	7	1	14	2	462	569	-107	19
11	Burleigh Bears	22	5	2	15	2	434	548	-114	16
12	Sunshine Coast Sea Eagles	22	2	0	20	2	325	790	-465	8

== Finals series ==
Home	Score	Away	Match Information
Home	Score	Away	Date and time (local)	Venue
Qualifying / Elimination Finals
Wynnum Manly Seagulls	6 – 33	Ipswich Jets	8 September 2013, 2:00pm	BMD Kougari Oval
Mackay Cutters	18 – 31	Easts Tigers	8 September 2013, 2:00pm	Virgin Australia Stadium
Semi-finals
Mackay Cutters	27 – 16	Ipswich Jets	14 September 2013, 6:00pm	Virgin Australia Stadium
Northern Pride	16 – 29	Easts Tigers	15 September 2013, 1:30pm	Barlow Park
Preliminary Final
Northern Pride	6 – 20	Mackay Cutters	22 September 2013, 2:00pm	Langlands Park
Grand Final
Easts Tigers	20 – 27	Mackay Cutters	29 September 2013, 3:50pm	North Ipswich Reserve

Qualifying / Elimination Finals
2	Mackay	18
3	Easts	31
4	Wynnum Manly	6
5	Ipswich	33

Major / Minor Semi-finals
1	Northern Pride	16
Easts	29
Mackay	27
Ipswich	16

Preliminary Final
Northern Pride	6
Mackay	20

Grand Final
Easts	20
Mackay	27

== Grand Final ==
2013 Queensland Cup Grand Final

Sunday, 29 September
15:50 AEST (UTC+10)

Easts Tigers	20 – 27	Mackay Cutters
Tries: 3 Sa'u 9', 38'; Garbutt 69'; Goals: 4 Walker 9', pen 25', 39', 70' (4/4)	1st: 14–10; 2nd: 6–17; Report	Tries: 5 Faraimo 29', 32'; Milne 47'; Morgan 64'; Mitchell 79'; Goals: 3 Taylor 34' (1/3); Minto 65' (1/1); Milne 80' (1/1); Field goals: 1 Minto 74'; Sin bins: 1 Taylor (yellow card)

North Ipswich Reserve
Attendance: 6,706
Referee: Clayton Sharpe
Duncan Hall Medal: Anthony Mitchell (Mackay)

Easts Tigers	Position	Mackay Cutters
Ben Hampton	FB	Liam Taylor
Maeli Seve	WG	Bureta Faraimo
Junior Sa'u	CE	Michael Morgan
Shane Neumann	CE	Kalifa Faifai Loa
Mahe Fonua	WG	David Milne
Cody Walker	FE	Dan Murphy
Grant Giess	HB	Matt Minto
Steven Thorpe (c)	PR	Tyson Andrews
Tom Butterfield	HK	Anthony Mitchell
Mitch Garbutt	PR	Sam Hoare
Tim Glasby	SR	Jason Taumalolo
Dane Hogan	SR	Chris Gesch
Matt Zgrajewski	LK	Jardine Bobongie (c)
Kenny Bromwich	Bench	Dean Webster
Liam McDonald	Bench	Jason Schirnack
Leon Panapa	Bench	Karl Davies
Isaac Kaufmann	Bench	Kelvin Nielsen
Craig Ingebrigtsen	Coach	Kim Williams

Easts, who finished the regular season in third, qualified for their third Grand Final after upsetting the second-placed Mackay in Week 1 and the first-placed Northern Pride in the major semi final. Mackay, after losing to Easts, defeated Ipswich in the minor semi final and upset the Pride 20–6 in the preliminary final to qualify for their first Grand Final.

=== First half ===
Easts were the first team to get on the board in the decided when centre Junior Sa'u scored in the 9th minute. In the 25th minute, they extended their lead to eight when Mackay put a dropout out on the full, kicking a penalty goal from right in front. The Cutters finally cracked the Tigers when winger Bureta Faraimo crossed in the right corner in the 29th minute. They took the lead for the first time when Faraimo scored his second in the 32nd minute, sprinting 50 metres down the sideline after a pass from his centre Michael Morgan. The lead didn't last long, as Easts scored in the 38th minute, when Sa'u latched onto a kick that the Cutters let bounce to score his second try.

=== Second half ===
Mackay levelled the scores at 14-all seven minutes into the second half when winger David Milne scored in the left corner. In the 64th minute, Mackay captured their second lead of the contest when Morgan picked up a loose ball and ran 50 metres to score in the right corner. Again, the lead did not last long, as Easts' prop Mitch Garbutt muscled over to score in the 69th minute. The Cutters took a one-point lead when halfback Matt Minto slotted a field goal from 20 metres out with six minutes left in the game. Mackay sealed the win in the 79th minute when hooker Anthony Mitchell darted from dummy half to score and secure the club's first Queensland Cup premiership. Mitchell was awarded the Duncan Hall Medal for Man of Match.

A North Queensland Cowboys feeder club, the Cutters' side featured Michael Morgan and Jason Taumalolo, who would both go on to become NRL regulars for the Cowboys and play in the club's 2015 NRL Grand Final win over the Brisbane Broncos.

== End-of-season awards ==
- Courier Mail Medal (Best and Fairest): Cody Walker ( Easts Tigers)
- Coach of the Year: Jason Demetriou ( Northern Pride)
- Rookie of the Year: Cameron Munster ( Central Queensland Capras)
- Representative Player of the Year: Nick Slyney ( Queensland Residents, Redcliffe Dolphins)
- XXXX People's Choice Award: Hezron Murga ( Northern Pride)

== See also ==
- Queensland Cup
- Queensland Rugby League
