= Ulugia =

Ulugia is a surname. Notable people with the surname include:

- Chris Ulugia (born 1992), New Zealand rugby league player
- John Ulugia (born 1986), Australian rugby union player
- Wayne Ulugia (born 1992), New Zealand rugby league player
