= Scott Minto (rugby league) =

Australian rugby league footballer

Personal information
- Born: 20 September 1978 (age 47) Rockhampton, Queensland, Australia

Playing information
- Position: Wing, Centre
Club
Years	Team	Pld	T	G	FG	P
2002–06	Brisbane Broncos	39	12	0	0	48
2007	North Qld Cowboys	14	3	0	0	12
	Total	53	15	0	0	60
- Relatives: Matt Minto (nephew)

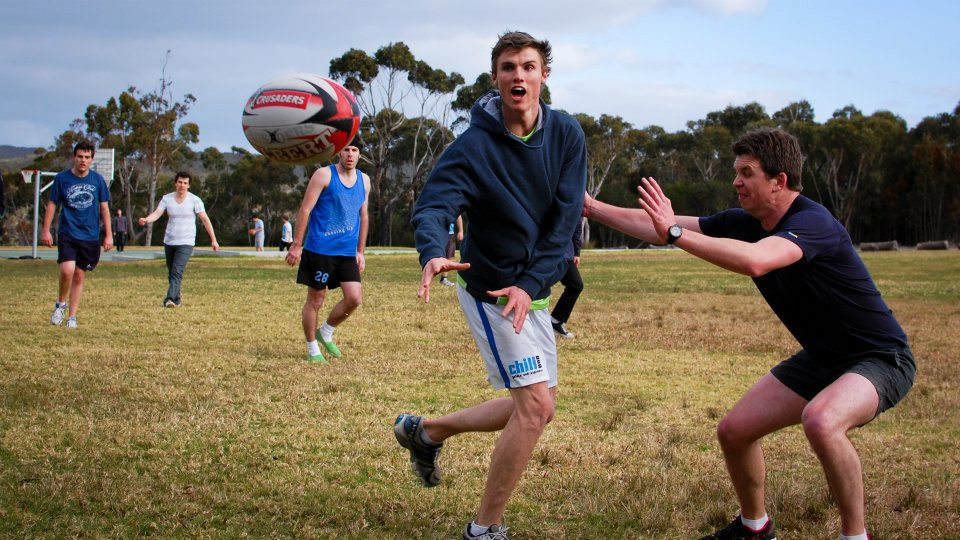
Scott Minto passing a football

Scott Minto (born 20 September 1978) is a former professional rugby league footballer who played on the wing in 14 games for the North Queensland Cowboys and 39 games for the Brisbane Broncos in the NRL.

== Background ==
Minto was born in Rockhampton, Queensland, Australia. His nephew Matt played for the Newcastle Knights.

== Career ==
Minto's junior rugby league club was the Yeppoon Seagulls in Central Queensland.

His brief career included spells at both the Brisbane Broncos and North Queensland Cowboys. His preferred position was wing. In 2003 while playing for Brisbane, Minto scored the winning try in golden point against Melbourne where he jumped for the try line. Fox Sports commentator Warren Smith described Minto's jump as if he was a hurdler at The Olympics.

Minto was the Executive Officer of the Central Comets a team in the Queensland Cup. After 3 years as CEO Minto resigned on 8 April 2011, the share price notably dropping considerably upon announcement.

In the years since his retirement, Minto has become somewhat of a cult figure in the history of rugby league and has featured in several online memes. In 2017, betting company Sportsbet erected a statue out the front of Suncorp Stadium in Brisbane as a publicity stunt with the words engraved "The People's Immortal".
