= Alan Schirnack =

New Zealand rugby league footballer

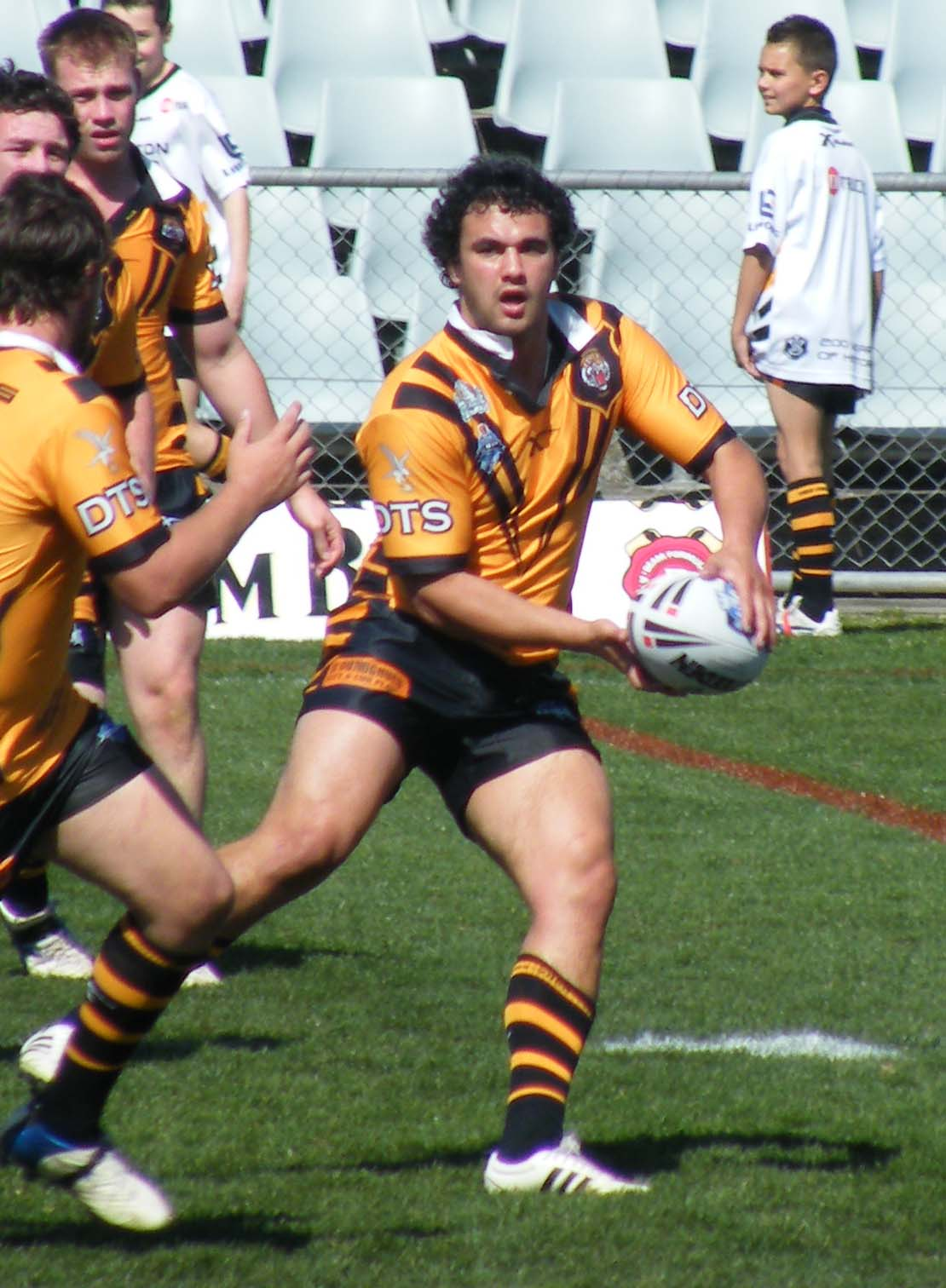
- Schirnack playing for the Balmain Tigers in 2008

Personal information
- Full name: Alan Schirnack
- Born: 28 November 1986 (age 39) Wellington, New Zealand
- Height: 186 cm (6 ft 1 in)
- Weight: 103 kg (16 st 3 lb)

Playing information
- Position: Second-row, Prop
Club
Years	Team	Pld	T	G	FG	P
2009–11	Wests Tigers	14	0	0	0	0
- Source: As of 30 January 2019
- Relatives: Jason Schirnack (brother)

Alan Schirnack (born 28 November 1986) is a New Zealand former professional rugby league footballer who last played for the Wests Tigers in the National Rugby League (NRL). Schirnack primarily played in the forwards. He is the brother of Jason Schirnack.

== Playing career ==
While playing for the Tigers' feeder club Balmain-Ryde Eastwood Tigers in the NSW Cup, Schirnack was awarded the Alan Gardiner Memorial Trophy in 2008.

Following a late injury to Tim Moltzen, Schirnack was added to the bench and made his first-grade debut for the Wests Tigers against Parramatta Eels at Parramatta Stadium in Round 14 2009. Schirnack made 5 appearances for the Tigers in 2009, but none in 2010.

With the Wests Tigers missing Bryce Gibbs, Liam Fulton and Gareth Ellis early in 2011, Schirnack made two appearances in the starting team, and a number more from the bench as the season progressed.
