= Jason Taumalolo =

New Zealand and Tonga international rugby league footballer

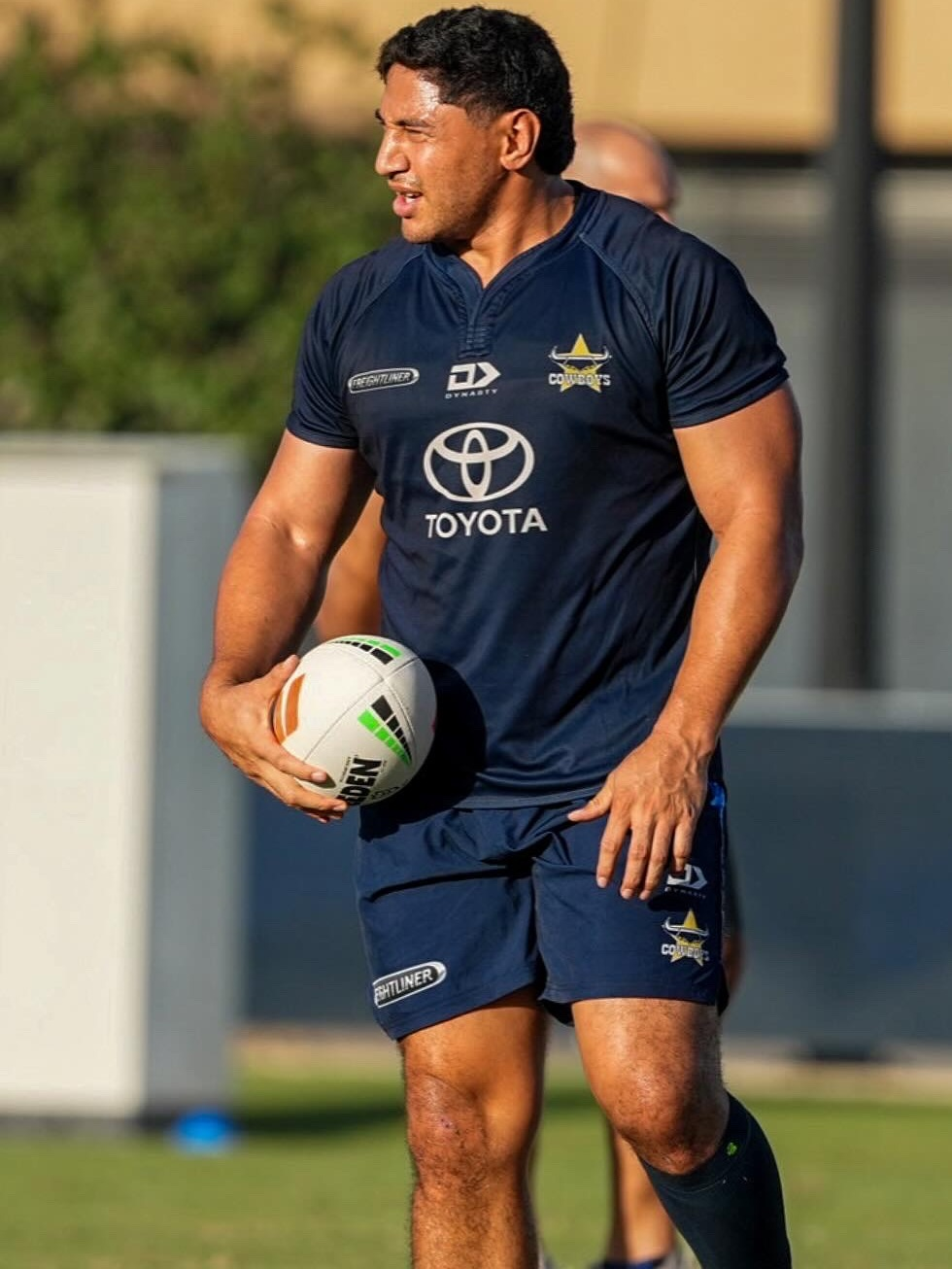

Personal information
- Full name: Vaai Taumalolo
- Born: 31 May 1993 (age 33) Auckland, New Zealand
- Height: 190 cm (6 ft 3 in)
- Weight: 118 kg (18 st 8 lb)

Playing information
- Position: Lock, Prop, Second-row
Club
Years	Team	Pld	T	G	FG	P
2010–	North Queensland Cowboys	309	40	0	0	160
Representative
Years	Team	Pld	T	G	FG	P
2013–	Tonga	24	4	0	0	16
2014–17	New Zealand	10	0	0	0	0
2015	NRL All Stars	1	0	0	0	0
- Source: As of 20 November 2026

Vaai Taumalolo (born 31 May 1993), better known by the nickname Jason, is a professional rugby league footballer who plays as a lock or prop forward for the North Queensland Cowboys in the National Rugby League (NRL). He has played for Tonga and New Zealand at international level.

Taumalolo played for the NRL All Stars and he was a member of the Cowboys' 2015 NRL Grand Final and 2016 World Club Challenge winning sides, and won the Dally M Medal in 2016. Taumalolo is notably the only forward in the 21st century to be awarded the Dally M Medal other than Danny Buderus and Cameron Smith. He played as a second-row forward early in his career.

Taumalolo became the most capped Cowboys player in history during the 2026 season, surpassing Jonathan Thurston's record.

== Background ==
Taumalolo was born in Auckland, New Zealand to parents Tominika and Vaai Akolo, and is of Tongan descent. Enrolled in primary school under his given name, Vaai, his teacher was unable to pronounce it correctly, instead deciding to call him "Jason".

He grew up in Māngere and started playing rugby league at the age of 4 for the Papakura Sea Eagles and attended De La Salle College along with older brother Warner.

At age 14, he moved to Townsville after being scouted and signed to a scholarship by the North Queensland Cowboys while playing for a touring New Zealand under-16 team. In Townsville, Taumalolo played his junior rugby league for Townsville Brothers and attended Kirwan State High School, where he represented the Australian Schoolboys at the age of 16.

During the start of his career at the North Queensland Cowboys, on the off-seasons, Taumalolo studied commerce at the University of Queensland. He resided at St Leo's College and was a part of the student klub executive team. His role was the 2nd year representative, also known proudly as “the phantom”.

== Playing career ==
=== Early career ===
In 2009, Taumalolo played for the Townsville Stingers in the Cyril Connell Cup, scoring seven tries. Later that year, he was selected in the Queensland under-16 team.

=== 2010 ===
In 2010, Taumalolo joined the Cowboys' under-20 side, making his debut at age 16. In Round 24 of the 2010 NRL season, he made his NRL debut for the Cowboys against the Canterbury-Bankstown Bulldogs, becoming the youngest ever player to debut for the club, aged 17 years, 2 months and 21 days, when he came off the bench in a 20–22 loss at Dairy Farmers Stadium. It was his only appearance for 2010. In October, Taumalolo played for the Junior Kiwis.

=== 2011 ===
Taumalolo would make his second NRL appearance almost a year later in Round 24 against the South Sydney Rabbitohs. He starred for the Cowboys in Round 25 against the Cronulla-Sutherland Sharks, coming off the interchange bench for the 3rd time to score two crucial tries and making two line breaks and 125 metres. At the end of the season, Taumalolo was awarded the Rugby League Player's Association's Toyota Cup Player of the Year award and was named in the Toyota Cup Team of the Year in the second-row. Taumalolo played in the Cowboys in the NYC grand final against the New Zealand Warriors, scoring a try in the golden point 31–30 loss. He played in three matches and scored two tries for the North Queensland outfit in 2011. In October, he again played for the Junior Kiwis.

=== 2012 ===
On 17 February, Taumalolo re-signed with North Queensland until the end of the 2015 season. In March, he was reported to have declared his allegiance to Queensland and Australia, though on 7 April, New Zealand Rugby League's high performance manager Tony Kemp confirmed that Taumalolo had pledged allegiance to New Zealand, the country of his birth. Taumalolo was named as a reserve in the New Zealand squad for the 2012 ANZAC Test against Australia, but was not selected to play.

Taumalolo finished the season with five tries in 17 matches. In October, he was again selected for the Junior Kiwis. He was described as the "next Sonny Bill Williams".

=== 2013 ===
On 20 April, Taumalolo made his international debut for Tonga in the Pacific Rugby League International against Samoa at Centerbet Stadium. Taumalolo was a standout in the Intrust Super Cup in the 2013 season, playing for Cowboys feeder club, the Mackay Cutters. The Cutters won the competition and dedicated their win to recently deceased teammate Alex Elisala. He would later go on to star for the Cowboys at the backend of the season including the club's semi-final loss to Cronulla. Taumalolo played 14 matches and scored 2 tries for the Cowboys in 2013. In October, he represented Tonga in the 2013 Rugby League World Cup, playing in 2 matches and scoring a try in their match against the Cook Islands.

=== 2014 ===
In February, Taumalolo was selected in the Cowboys tournament winning inaugural Auckland Nines squad. 2014 was a stand out season for Taumalolo with him playing 25 matches and scoring 6 tries as the Cowboys finished 5th. He made 241 hitups and gained 2889 metres. On 7 October, Taumalolo was selected in the Kiwis final 24 man squad for the Four Nations series. He made his test debut for New Zealand against Australia at lock in the Kiwis 30–12 win at Suncorp Stadium. Taumalolo played at lock in the Kiwis 22–18 Four Nations final win over Australia at Westpac Stadium. He capped off 2014 winning Tonga International Player of the Year Award.

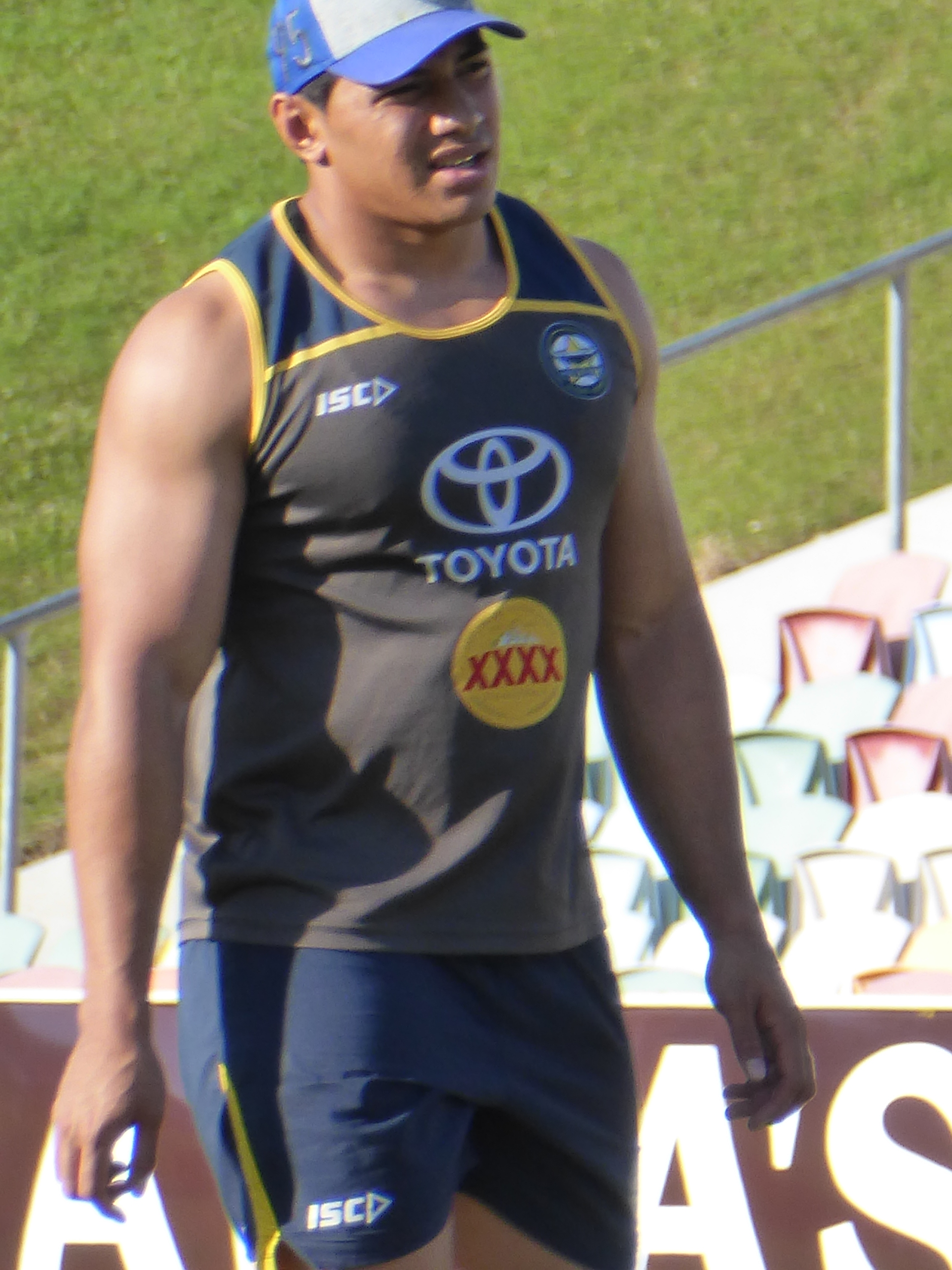
Taumalolo at Cowboys training in 2015

=== 2015 ===
On 27 January, Taumalolo was named in the Cowboys 2015 NRL Auckland Nines squad. On 13 February, he was selected at lock for the NRL All Stars in the All Stars match at Cbus Super Stadium. Rejecting a $2 million contract offer from the New Zealand Warriors, Taumalolo extended his contract with the North Queensland side to the end of the 2017 season. On 28 September, Taumalolo was named at lock in the Dally M Team of the Year. On 4 October, in North Queensland's Queensland derby 2015 NRL Grand Final against the Brisbane Broncos, Taumalolo started at lock in the Cowboys golden point 17–16 win. He finished North Queensland's premiership winning season with two tries from 26 matches. Taumalolo was selected in the 23-man New Zealand Test squad for the Baskerville Shield series but later withdrew due to injury.

=== 2016 ===
In the pre-season, Taumalolo again played in the Auckland Nines, and was a member of the Cowboys' World Club Challenge winning side, starting at lock in the 38–4 victory over the Leeds Rhinos at Headingley Stadium. On 6 May, Taumalolo played for the Kiwis against Australia, starting at lock in the 18–0 loss. In Round 14, he played his 100th NRL game.

Taumalolo was named the Rugby League Players Association Player of the Year by his fellow players. He was also named as the joint winner of the Dally M Medal with the Melbourne Storm's Cooper Cronk, in addition to being named Lock of the Year for the second consecutive season.

After the Four Nations final against Australia, Taumalolo and Valentine Holmes were flown to the United States to take part in drills as part of scouting for NFL teams. The outfits, including Kansas City, then offered Taumalolo the opportunity to inspect their set-ups in the strongest sign of an NFL future.

=== 2017 ===
On 22 March, Taumalolo re-signed with the North Queensland club on a ten-year deal, which would see him stay with the club until the end of the 2027 season. He would go on to play 26 games for the Cowboys during the 2017 season, starting all of them at lock. On 1 October, he started at lock in North Queensland's 2017 NRL Grand Final loss to the Melbourne Storm. He became the first forward in NRL history to run for over 5000 metres in a season, averaging 205.8 metres per game for the 2017 season.

On 5 October, Taumalolo was named in the Tonga squad for the 2017 Rugby League World Cup. He chose to represent the nation of his parents' birth, for whom he played for at the 2013 Rugby League World Cup, over the country of his birth New Zealand. This move, although negatively portrayed in mainstream media, was deemed a noble move by many of the public not only in New Zealand but around the world. On 6 October, he was awarded the Paul Bowman Medal for Cowboys' Player of the Year for the second straight season.

He was also awarded the Royal Order; alongside his Mate Ma'a Tonga players by King Tupou VI in their final visit to Tonga in 2017.

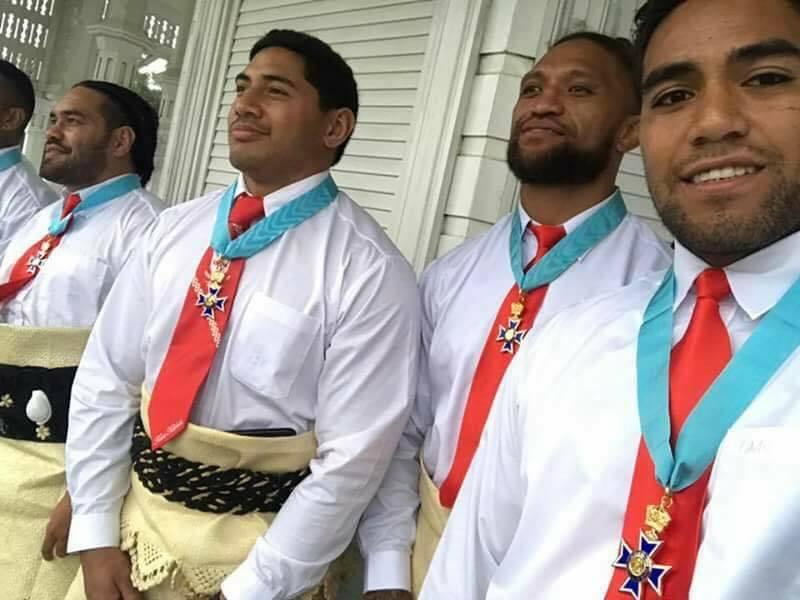
Taumalolo (2nd left) alongside Tongan teammates in 2017

=== 2018 ===
In Round 11 of the 2018 NRL season, Taumalolo played his 150th NRL game for North Queensland in their 19–20 loss to the South Sydney Rabbitohs.

Following another strong season, in which he averaged 177m per game, Taumalolo was awarded the Paul Bowman Medal for Cowboys' Player of the Year for the third straight time. On 26 September, he was named Lock of the Year at the 2018 Dally M Awards and finished sixth in voting, the highest of any forward.

On 5 October he was named in Tonga's squad for their Test match against Australia.

=== 2019 ===
In Round 1 of the 2019 NRL season, Taumalolo ran for a career-high 301 metres in the Cowboys' 24–12 win over the St. George Illawarra Dragons. In Round 2, he suffered a medial injury in a loss to the Brisbane Broncos, ruling him out for six weeks. He returned from injury in the Cowboys' Round 8 win over the Gold Coast Titans, scoring a try.

In Round 13, he set a new career-high with 311 running metres in a 20–22 loss to the Manly-Warringah Sea Eagles. In June, he started at lock for Tonga in their 14–34 loss to New Zealand.

In Round 21, Taumalolo suffered a partial tear to his plantar fascia, ruling him out for one week. He returned to play through the injury for the final three games of the season. Taumalolo played 18 games in 2019, his lowest tally since 2013. He finished the season with an average of 196.6 metres per game, the most for any forward in the competition.

On 18 September, he won the Paul Bowman Medal for Cowboys' Player of the Year for the fourth straight season.

On 26 October, Taumalolo led Tonga in beating Great Britain. A week later on 2 November, he led Tonga in their win against Australia, creating history as the first tier 2 nation to beat Australia since the system came into place. He stated that it was the greatest moment of his career.

=== 2020 ===
In February, Taumalolo was the captain of the Cowboys' 2020 NRL Nines winning squad and was named in the Team of the Tournament. He and teammate Kyle Feldt became the first players to win two NRL Nines championships.

In Round 2, he set a new career-high with 345 running metres in a 24–16 win against the Canterbury-Bankstown Bulldogs. This was the most metres gained by a forward in one match and the third most of all time. In Round 6, Taumalolo captained the Cowboys for the first time, going onto captain the side six more times that season.

In North Queensland's Round 15 loss to the Newcastle Knights, tore his calf, ruling him out for three weeks. He returned off the bench in Round 19 in a loss to the Penrith Panthers.

On 3 October, Taumalolo won the Paul Bowman Medal for the fifth consecutive season, beating Johnathan Thurston's record of four wins. On 16 December, Taumalolo was named as co-captain of the Cowboys for the 2021 season, alongside Michael Morgan.

=== 2021 ===
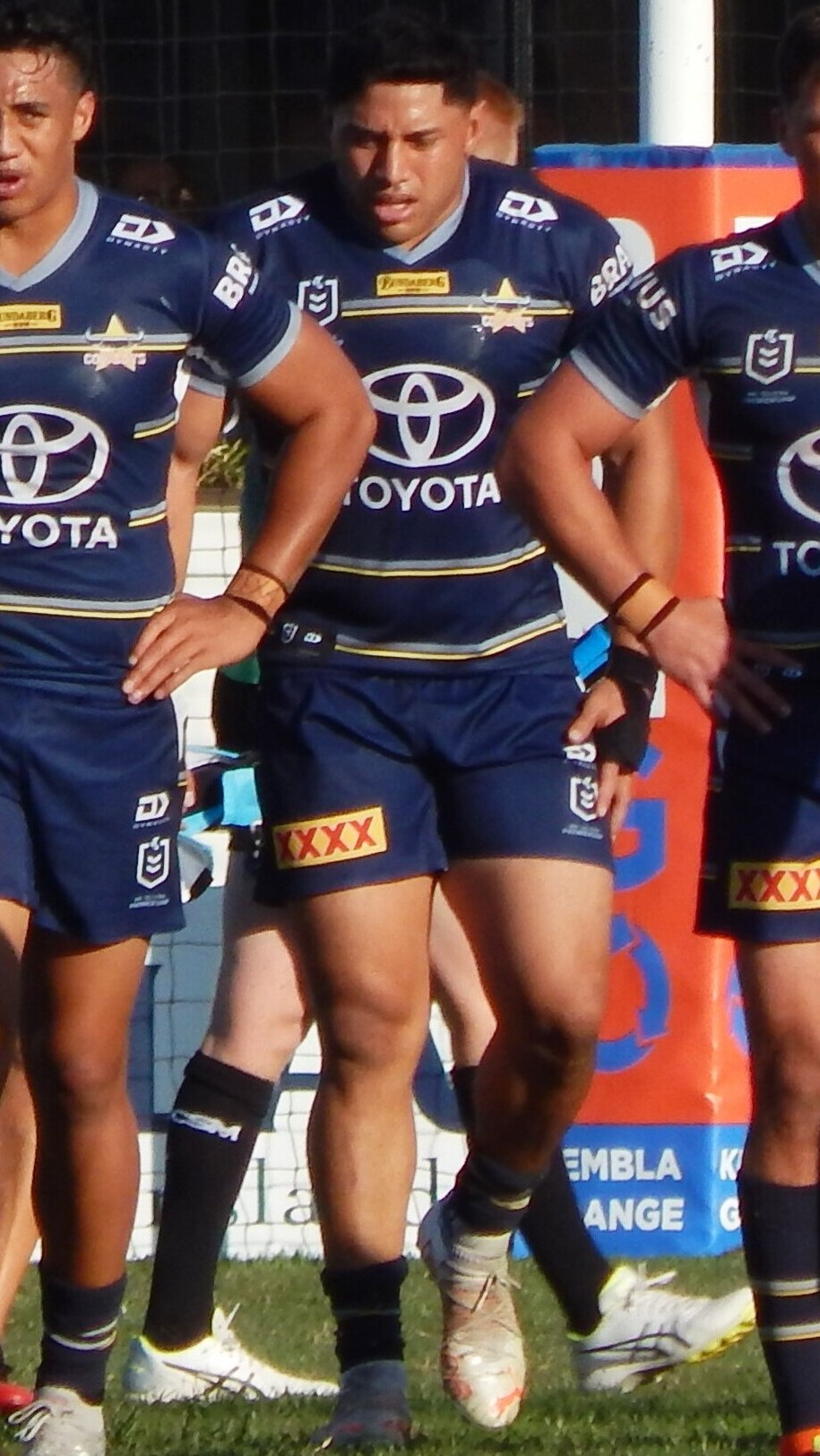
Taumalolo playing for the Cowboys in 2021

Taumalolo played 15 games in the NRL, scoring one try. North Queensland would finish the 2021 NRL season in 15th position on the table narrowly avoiding the Wooden Spoon.

=== 2022 ===
Taumalolo played for Tonga against New Zealand on 25 June at Mt Smart stadium. Taumalolo played 25 games for North Queensland in the 2022 NRL season including both the clubs finals matches which saw them finish one game short of the Grand Final losing to Parramatta in the preliminary final 24–20. Taumalolo was sin binned during the game for a high tackle. In the third group game at the 2021 Rugby League World Cup, Taumalolo scored two tries and was awarded man of the match in Tonga's 92–10 victory over the Cook Islands.

=== 2023 ===
Taumalolo played 16 games for North Queensland in the 2023 NRL season as the club finished 11th on the table.

=== 2024 ===
Taumalolo played 23 games for North Queensland in the 2024 NRL season as they finished 5th on the table and qualified for the finals. He played in both finals games for North Queensland as they were eliminated in the second week by Cronulla.

=== 2025 ===
Taumalolo was limited to only ten games for North Queensland in the 2025 NRL season as the club finished 12th on the table.

=== 2026 ===
On 8 May during NRL Round 10, Taumalolo surpassed Johnathan Thurston's club record of 294 games and became the most capped player of the Cowboys. He played 24 matches for North Queensland in the 2026 NRL season as the club finished 8th and qualified for the finals. He played in the clubs elimination final loss to Cronulla.

== Achievements and accolades ==
=== Individual ===
- Dally M Medal: 2016
- Rugby League Players Association Player of the Year: 2016
- Rugby League Week Player of the Year: 2016
- Dally M Lock of the Year: 2015, 2016, 2018
- Paul Bowman Medal: 2016, 2017, 2018, 2019, 2020, 2022
- North Queensland Cowboys Players' Player of the Year: 2016, 2017, 2018
- North Queensland Cowboys Member's Player of the Year: 2016, 2019
- North Queensland Cowboys Rookie of the Year: 2012
- North Queensland Cowboys NYC Player of the Year: 2010, 2011
- NYC Team of the Year: 2011
- Rugby League Players Association NYC Player of the Year: 2011
- Most Capped Cowboy Round 10 2026
- 2026, 300 NRL games

=== Team ===
- 2014 Auckland Nines: North Queensland Cowboys – Winners
- 2015 NRL Grand Final: North Queensland Cowboys – Winners
- 2016 World Club Challenge: North Queensland Cowboys – Winners
- 2020 NRL Nines: North Queensland Cowboys – Winners

== Statistics ==
=== NRL ===
Statistics are correct to the end finals round one of the 2026 season

†	Denotes seasons in which Taumalolo won an NRL Premiership

Season	Team	Matches	T	G	GK %	F/G	Pts
2010	North Queensland	1	0	0	—	0	0
2011	North Queensland	3	2	0	—	0	8
2012	North Queensland	17	5	0	—	0	20
2013	North Queensland	14	2	0	—	0	8
2014	North Queensland	25	6	0	—	0	24
2015†	North Queensland	26	2	0	—	0	8
2016	North Queensland	27	6	0	—	0	24
2017	North Queensland	26	4	0	—	0	16
2018	North Queensland	23	4	0	—	0	16
2019	North Queensland	18	3	0	—	0	12
2020	North Queensland	16	2	0	—	0	8
2021	North Queensland	15	1	0	—	0	4
2022	North Queensland	25	1	0	—	0	4
2023	North Queensland	16	0	0	—	0	0
2024	North Queensland	23	0	0	—	0	0
2025	North Queensland	10	0	0	—	0	0
2026	North Queensland	24	2	0	—	0	8
Career totals		309	40	0	—	0	160

=== International ===
Season	Team	Matches	T	G	GK %	F/G	Pts
2013	Tonga	3	1	0	—	0	4
2014	New Zealand	4	0	0	—	0	0
2016	New Zealand	5	0	0	—	0	0
2017	New Zealand	1	0	0	—	0	0
2017	Tonga	5	1	0	—	0	4
2018	Tonga	1	0	0	—	0	0
2019	Tonga	4	0	0	—	0	0
2022	Tonga	1	0	0	—	0	0
2024	Tonga	3					
Career totals		28	2	0	—	0	8
