= Alex Elisala =

New Zealand rugby league footballer

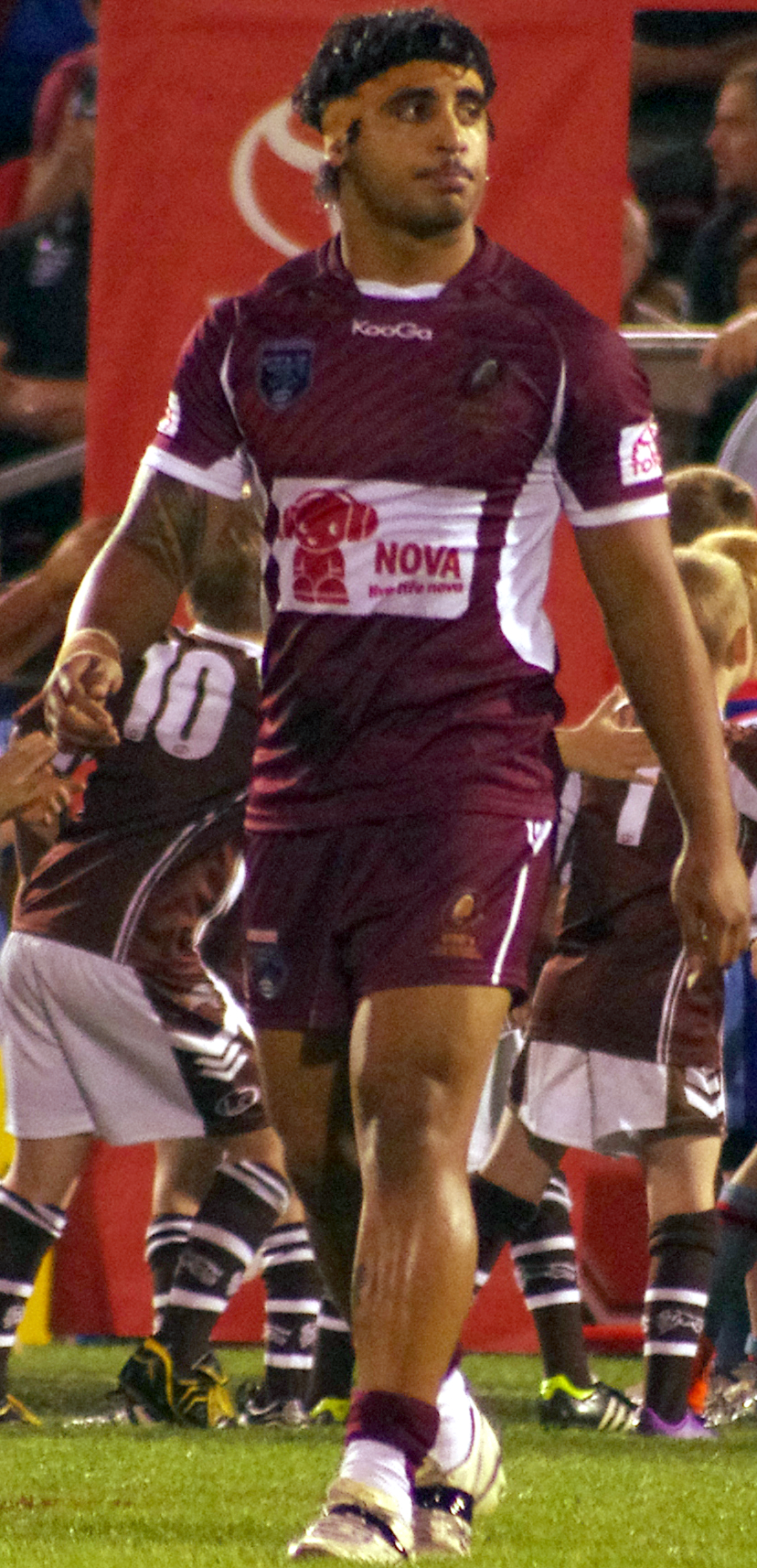

Personal information
- Born: 17 August 1992 Auckland, New Zealand
- Died: 29 April 2013 (aged 20) Mackay, Queensland, Australia

Playing information
- Height: 177 cm (5 ft 10 in)
- Weight: 90 kg (14 st 2 lb)
- Position: Hooker
Representative
Years	Team	Pld	T	G	FG	P
2013	Samoa	1	0	0	0	0

Alex Elisala (17 August 1992 – 29 April 2013) was a Samoa international rugby league footballer who was contracted to the North Queensland Cowboys at the time of his death. He primarily played as a hooker.

== Early life ==
Elisala was born in Auckland, New Zealand, and moved to Woodridge, Queensland, Australia when he was one year old. Of Samoan descent, he played his junior rugby league for the Logan Brothers, before moving to Townsville, Queensland. Whilst there he attended Ignatius Park College, and became close friends with future Cowboys teammate Michael Morgan.

== Playing career ==
Elisala played 69 games for the Cowboys in the National Youth Competition from 2010 to 2012. He started his NYC career as a fullback, and wing before moving into the hooker position. He represented the Queensland under-20 team on 21 April 2012. In 2013, Elisala progressed into the Cowboys' NRL training squad. He began the season playing for their feeder team, the Mackay Cutters, in the Queensland Cup. On 20 April 2013, he debuted for the Samoan national team in their Pacific Rugby League International match against Tonga.

== Death ==
In the early hours of Sunday, 28 April 2013, paramedics and police were called to a Mackay CBD hotel where Elisala, 20, was found unconscious and not breathing after plunging from a hotel balcony.

Elisala was admitted to Mackay Base Hospital, and put on life support. He died the following evening after his condition worsened and his life support system was turned off.

Elisala had most recently played for the Cutters on Saturday night, scoring a try in their 22–22 draw with the Tweed Heads Seagulls.

=== Reaction ===
The Mackay Cutters retired jersey number 14, which Elisala had worn regularly off the interchange bench, for the remainder of the 2013 season. A minute's silence was observed at Parramatta Stadium on 4 May 2013 prior to the Cowboys' NRL match against the Parramatta Eels. The Cowboys players also wore black armbands during the game to honour Elisala. Following the suicide of Wests Tigers-contracted Mosese Fotuaika on 28 February 2013, Elisala's death by suicide provoked scrutiny of the NRL's welfare systems for young players.
