= Chris Ulugia =

New Zealand rugby league footballer (born 1992)

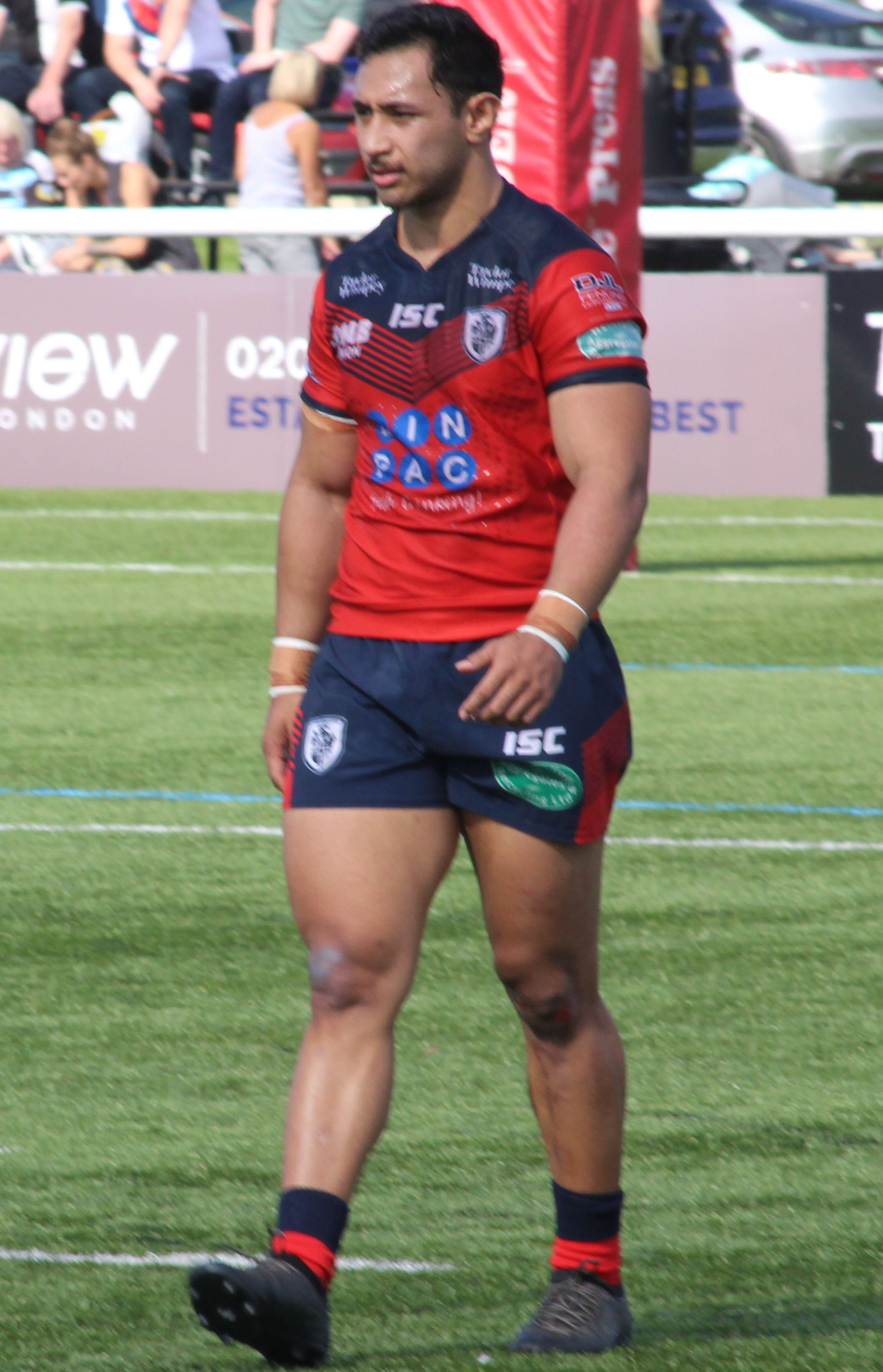
- Ulugia in 2017

Personal information
- Full name: Christopher Ulugia
- Born: 15 January 1992 (age 34) New Zealand
- Height: 5 ft 11 in (1.80 m)
- Weight: 15 st 4 lb (97 kg)

Playing information
- Position: Centre, Wing
Club
Years	Team	Pld	T	G	FG	P
2015–16	Bradford Bulls	6	4	0	0	16
2015(loan)	→ Oxford	2	0	0	0	0
2015(loan)	→ Batley Bulldogs	3	2	0	0	8
2016(loan)	→ Batley Bulldogs	26	13	0	0	52
2017	Featherstone Rovers	22	11	0	0	44
	Total	59	30	0	0	120
- Source: As of 7 June 2025

Chris Ulugia (born 15 January 1992) is a New Zealand professional rugby league footballer who plays for Featherstone Rovers in the Championship. He plays as a centre.

== Background ==
Ulugia was born in New Zealand and is of Samoan heritage. He moved to Australia at the age of three and represented New South Wales at the youth level.

== Playing career ==
Ulugia is a former Parramatta junior and who then played in the Queensland Cup for the Mackay Cutters. He was the part of the Cutters side that won the 2013 Queensland Cup.

=== Bradford ===
Ulugia signed for Bradford Bulls on a 2-year deal in 2015. He featured in the pre-season friendlies against Castleford and Leeds. He scored against Leeds (1 try).

He featured in Round 1 (Leigh Centurions) then in Round 3 (Featherstone Rovers). Ulugia played in Round 5 (Batley Bulldogs) then in Round 7 (Halifax). He featured in Round 9 (London Broncos). Ulugia played in the Challenge Cup in Round 5 (Hull Kingston Rovers). He scored against Featherstone Rovers (2 tries), Batley Bulldogs (1 try) and London Broncos (1 try).

He was later loaned out to Oxford and then Batley Bulldogs. Batley Bulldogs attempted to sign Ulugia permanently for the 2016 season, however he failed to gain a visa and instead remained at Batley Bulldogs as a Bradford Bulls loanee.

=== Featherstone Rovers ===
He played part of the 2017 season with Featherstone Rovers, cut short with a serious shoulder injury; he then returned home.
