= Dave Petersen =

English rugby league footballer

Personal information
- Full name: David Petersen
- Born: 6 March 1992 (age 33); Hull, East Riding of Yorkshire, England
- Height: 5 ft 10 in (178 cm)
- Weight: 13 st 8 lb (86 kg)

Playing information
- Position: Loose forward
Club
Years	Team	Pld	T	G	FG	P
2012	Hull Kingston Rovers	4	1	0	0	4
2012(loan)	→ Workington Town	3	0	0	0	0
2013–14	Mackay Cutters	0	0	0	0	0
2015	Bradford Bulls	0	0	0	0	0
2015(loan)	→ Oxford	3	2	0	0	8
2015(loan)	→ Sheffield Eagles	8	1	0	0	4
2016	Batley Bulldogs	2	0	0	0	0
2017–18	Boston Thirteens	0	0	0	0	0
2019–20	York City Knights	7	1	0	0	4
2022–	Doncaster R.L.F.C.	22	2	0	0	8
	Total	49	7	0	0	28
- Source: As of 7 January 2023

Dave Petersen is an English rugby league footballer who plays as a loose forward for the Doncaster R.L.F.C. in the RFL League 1.

== Background ==
Petersen was born in Kingston upon Hull, East Riding of Yorkshire, England.

=== Doncaster R.L.F.C. ===
On 10 Dec 2021 it was reported that he had signed for Doncaster R.L.F.C. in the RFL League 1
