= Zac Santo =

France international rugby league footballer

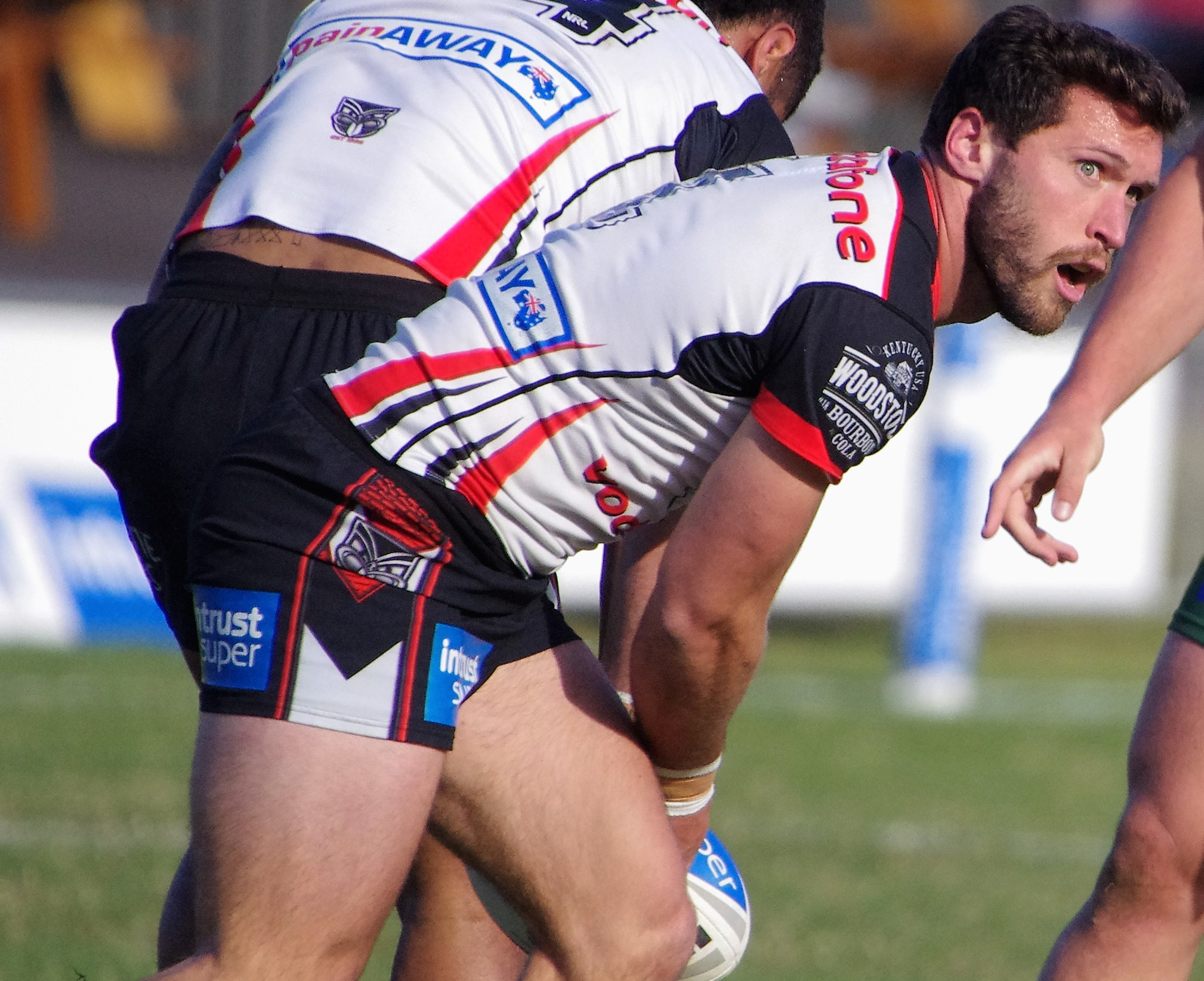

Personal information
- Full name: Zachary Santo
- Born: 8 April 1993 (age 32) Townsville, Queensland, Australia
- Height: 175 cm (5 ft 9 in)
- Weight: 85 kg (13 st 5 lb)

Playing information
- Position: Fullback
Club
Years	Team	Pld	T	G	FG	P
2014	North Qld Cowboys	1	0	0	0	0
2016–17	Canberra Raiders	2	1	0	0	4
2019–23	Limoux Grizzlies	56	45	18	0	216
2023	Toulouse Olympique	13	11	4	0	0
2023–	Limoux Grizzlies	39	20	5	1	54
	Total	111	77	27	1	274
Representative
Years	Team	Pld	T	G	FG	P
2019	Queensland Residents	1	0	0	0	0
2025	France	1	0	0	0	0
- Source: As of 8 January 2024

Zachary Santo (born 8 April 1993) is a France international rugby league footballer who plays for Toulouse Olympique in the RFL Championship. He plays at fullback and wing, and formerly played for the Limoux Grizzlies, North Queensland Cowboys and the Canberra Raiders.

== Background ==
Of Indigenous Australian Italian and Ni-Vanuatu descent, Santo was born in Townsville, Queensland, and grew up in Charters Towers. He played his junior rugby league for the Charters Towers Miners and later the Townsville Brothers, and attended Blackheath and Thornburgh College. While at Blackheath and Thornburgh, Santo was a Queensland Reds scholarship holder.

== Playing career ==
=== Early career ===
In 2011, Santo joined the North Queensland Cowboys NYC squad on a trial and train contract and represented the Queensland under 18s team. That year he played in the Cowboys' 2011 NYC Grand Final defeat by the New Zealand Warriors. At the end of 2012, Santo won the Cowboys' NYC Player of the Year award.

In 2013, Santo played for the Queensland under 20s team. He finished his NYC career at the end of 2013 with 65 games, scoring 49 tries.

On 5 August 2013, Santo re-signed with the Cowboys on a 2-year contract and joined the Cowboys first grade squad in 2014.

=== 2014 ===
Santo started the 2014 season playing for the Cowboys' Queensland Cup team, the Mackay Cutters.

In round 17 of the 2014 NRL season, Santo made his NRL debut for the Cowboys against the St. George Illawarra Dragons.

=== 2015 ===
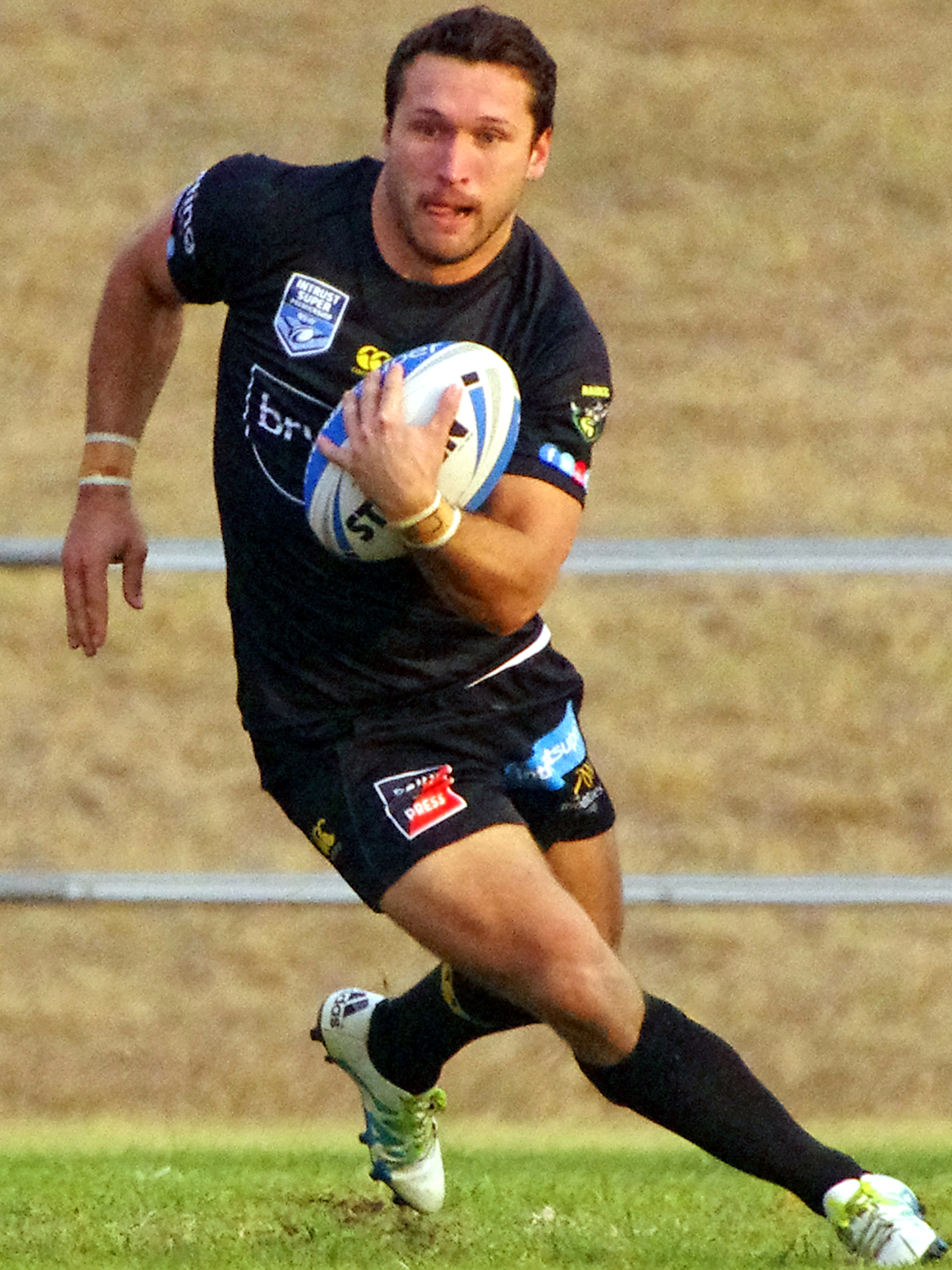
Santo playing for the Mount Pritchard Mounties in 2016

Santo spent the 2015 season playing for another Cowboys' feeder club, the Townsville Blackhawks, in the Queensland Cup. Playing on the wing Santo scored a try during the Blackhawks 32-20 loss to Ipswich in the Grand Final. At the end of the 2015 season, he was released by the Cowboys.

In December, Santo signed a 1-year contract with the Canberra Raiders starting in 2016.

=== 2016 ===
Santo played for the Mount Pritchard Mounties in the NSW Cup. In September, Santo was named at fullback in the 2016 Intrust Super Premiership NSW Team of the Year. Santo was a member of The Mounties side which lost in The NSW Cup Grand Final to Illawarra 21-20

=== 2017 ===
Santo was named in the Canberra Raiders squad for the 2017 NRL Auckland Nines. On 25 May, Santo was immediately released from his final year of his Canberra contract, and signed a one-and-a-half-year deal with the New Zealand Warriors.

=== 2018 ===
On 16 May, Santo was granted a release from his Warriors' contract and re-joined the Townsville Blackhawks for the remainder of the season. During his time at the Warriors he didn't feature in a single NRL game.

=== 2019 ===
On 7 August, it was revealed that Santo had signed a contract to join the Limoux Grizzlies in the Elite One Championship.

=== 2023 ===
On 21 June, it was revealed that Santo had signed a contract to join the Toulouse Olympique in the RFL Championship. On 15 October, Santo played in Toulouse Olympique's upset RFL Championship final loss against the London Broncos.

=== 2025 ===
After 5 years of living in France Santo qualified for the National team through residency. He captained the Chanticleers on debut; playing fullback in a 30-10 win over Morocco on the 22nd February, 2025.

== Statistics ==
=== NRL ===
Season	Team	Matches	T	G	GK %	F/G	Pts
2014	North Queensland Cowboys	1	0	0	–	0	0
2016	Canberra Raiders	1	0	0	–	0	0
2017	Canberra Raiders	1	1	0	–	0	4
Career totals		3	1	0	—	0	4
