= Rohan Ahern =

Australian rugby league footballer

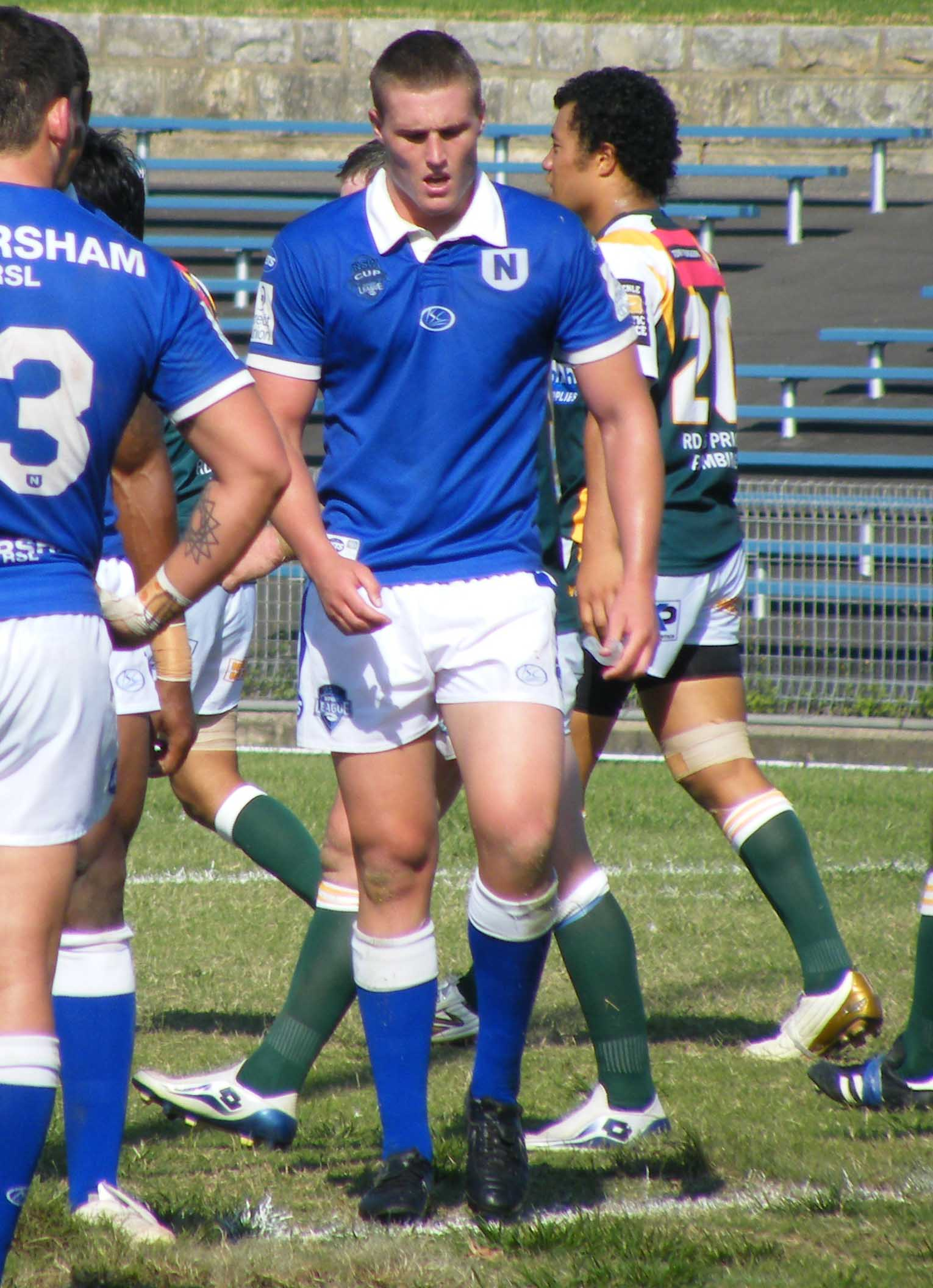

Personal information
- Full name: Rohan Michael Ahern
- Born: 15 June 1988 (age 36); Brisbane, Queensland Australia
- Height: 189 cm (6 ft 2 in)
- Weight: 97 kg (15 st 4 lb)

Playing information
- Position: Second-row
Club
Years	Team	Pld	T	G	FG	P
2009	Sydney Roosters	4	0	0	0	0

Rohan Ahern (born 15 June 1988) is an Australian former professional rugby league footballer who played NRL for the Sydney Roosters and Brisbane Broncos.

== Playing career ==
A North St Josephs junior, he made his debut for the Sydney Roosters in round 4 of the 2009 NRL season playing four games that year. An aspiring raw talent, he signed with the Brisbane Broncos for the 2010 and 2011 seasons, he played two lower grade games for the Brisbane outfit before an anterior cruciate ligament (ACL) knee injury early in the season prevented him from playing for the remainder of the year.

In October 2011, Ahern signed with North Queensland Cowboys and played for their feeder team the Mackay Cutters in the Queensland Cup. once again a season ending injury prevented him from playing the season and forced his retirement of the NRL.

== Post playing ==
In 2012, Ahern undertook four-year Diesel Fitting Apprenticeship which he completed.Ahern now works as a Diesel Fitter.
