= David Milne (rugby league) =

Australian rugby league footballer

Personal information
- Full name: David Milne
- Born: 22 January 1986 (age 39) Griffith, New South Wales, Australia
- Height: 1.80 m (5 ft 11 in)
- Weight: 89 kg (14 st 0 lb)

Playing information
- Position: Fullback, Wing
Club
| Years | Team | Pld | T | G | FG | P |
|---|---|---|---|---|---|---|
| 2005–11 | Canberra Raiders | 52 | 23 | 0 | 0 | 92 |
Representative
| Years | Team | Pld | T | G | FG | P |
| 2010 | Queensland Residents | 1 | 0 | 0 | 0 | 0 |
- Source: As of 5 January 2024

David Milne (born 22 January 1986) is an Australian former professional rugby league footballer who played in the 2000s and 2010s. Milne last played for the Mackay Cutters which is a feeder team for the North Queensland Cowboys. His usual position was as a Fullback.

== Playing career ==
Milne debuted for the Canberra Raiders in 2005, winning the club's rookie of the year award. After a period moving between the NRL and Premier League Milne returned to the Raiders side in round 9 of 2007, securing a regular first grade position at wing. Early 2008 a season-ending injury to William Zillman gave Milne the opportunity to start at fullback after Bronx Goodwin failed to hold his position as the fill in Fullback for Zillman.

After limited opportunities in Canberra and being the 3rd choice fullback behind Josh Dugan and Nathan Massey, Milne signed with the North Queensland Cowboys in October 2011 and played for their feeder team the Mackay Cutters in 2012.

== Field hockey career ==
In 2023, Milne began playing amateur field hockey in the Griffith Hockey Association winter competition. He signed for the Bulldogs Hockey Club, where his brother Paul was a long-term player. Milne played 16 matches across the season, scoring two goals and receiving a green card. The season was a success for Milne, with the Bulldogs securing the minor premiership and subsequently the premiership against the Exies Galahs Hockey Club.

2024 again saw the Bulldogs, and subsequently Milne, challenging strongly in the competition. Milne had his best season to date, playing 17 matches, scoring three goals, and finishing in the top three in his club's best and fairest. The Bulldogs won the minor premiership again, however, they were unable to secure the premiership, with the Exies Galahs Hockey Club taking the title.

The Bulldogs retained Milne in their attempt to recover the 2025 title. Milne played 17 matches across the season. The Bulldogs started the season strongly, on course to become minor premiers for the fifth consecutive season, however, a decline in form for the Bulldogs coincided with a strong run from the Exies Galahs, who took home the minor premiership. The two sides met in the grand final for the third year in a row. The match was tied 1-1 at full time, and a result was unable to be obtained during golden goal extra time. Subsequently, the match went to a penalty shootout. With the shootout count at 1-3 in the Exies Galahs' favor, Milne took the 4th penalty for the Bulldogs. Unfortunately for Milne, he was unable to beat the Exies Galahs' goalkeeper, Carl Robinson, which saw the Exies Galahs retain the premiership.
