= Tyson Andrews =

Australian rugby league footballer

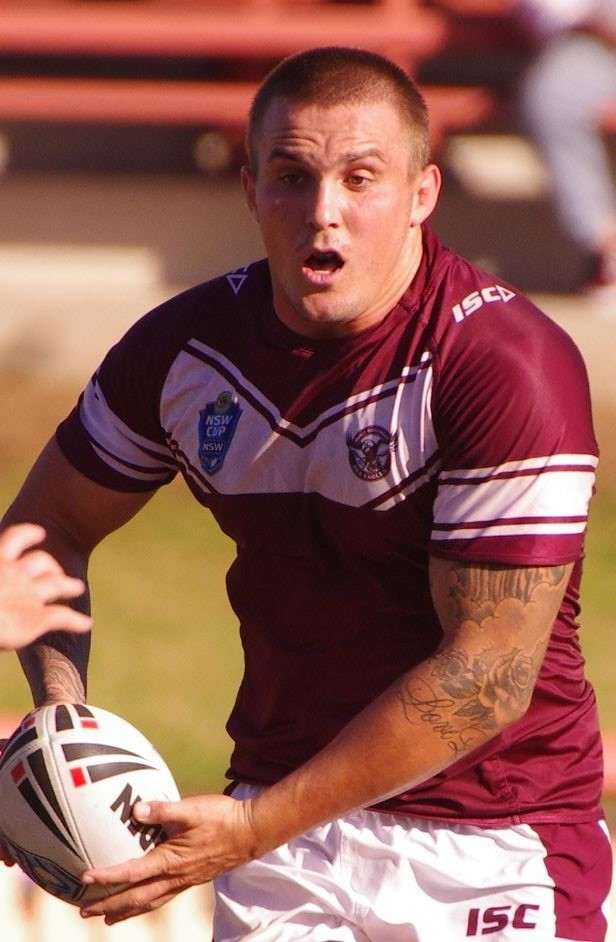
- Andrews playing for the Sea Eagles in 2014.

Personal information
- Full name: Tyson Andrews
- Born: 6 February 1990 (age 36) Maitland, New South Wales, Australia
- Height: 187 cm (6 ft 2 in)
- Weight: 108 kg (17 st 0 lb)

Playing information
- Position: Prop
Club
Years	Team	Pld	T	G	FG	P
2014	Manly Sea Eagles	4	0	0	0	0
Representative
Years	Team	Pld	T	G	FG	P
2015	Indigenous All Stars	1	0	0	0	0
- Source: Rugby League Project As of 18 June 2024

Tyson Andrews (born 6 February 1990) is an Australian former professional rugby league footballer. He played as a prop. He previously played for the Manly Warringah Sea Eagles in the National Rugby League and last played for the Redcliffe Dolphins in the Queensland Cup.

== Background ==
Born in Maitland, New South Wales, Andrews is of Indigenous Australian descent and moved to Queensland at a young age. He played his junior rugby league for the Maroochydore Swans, before being signed by the Brisbane Broncos.

== Playing career ==
In 2008 and 2009, Andrews played for the Brisbane Broncos' NYC team.

In 2010, Andrews quit rugby league and pursued boxing. He won the Australian heavyweight amateur title.

In 2011, Andrews moved to Mackay, Queensland to play for Wests, a local team. He was then brought into the squad of Queensland Cup team Mackay Cutters after impressing their coaching staff.

In June 2013, Andrews signed a two-year contract with the Manly Warringah Sea Eagles starting in 2014.

In round 18 of the 2014 NRL season, Andrews made his NRL debut for the Sea Eagles against the Wests Tigers.

On 13 February 2015, Andrews played for the Indigenous All Stars against the NRL All Stars in the annual All Stars match. In 2016, Andrews played for Redcliffe in the Queensland Cup.
