= Jason Schirnack =

New Zealand rugby league footballer

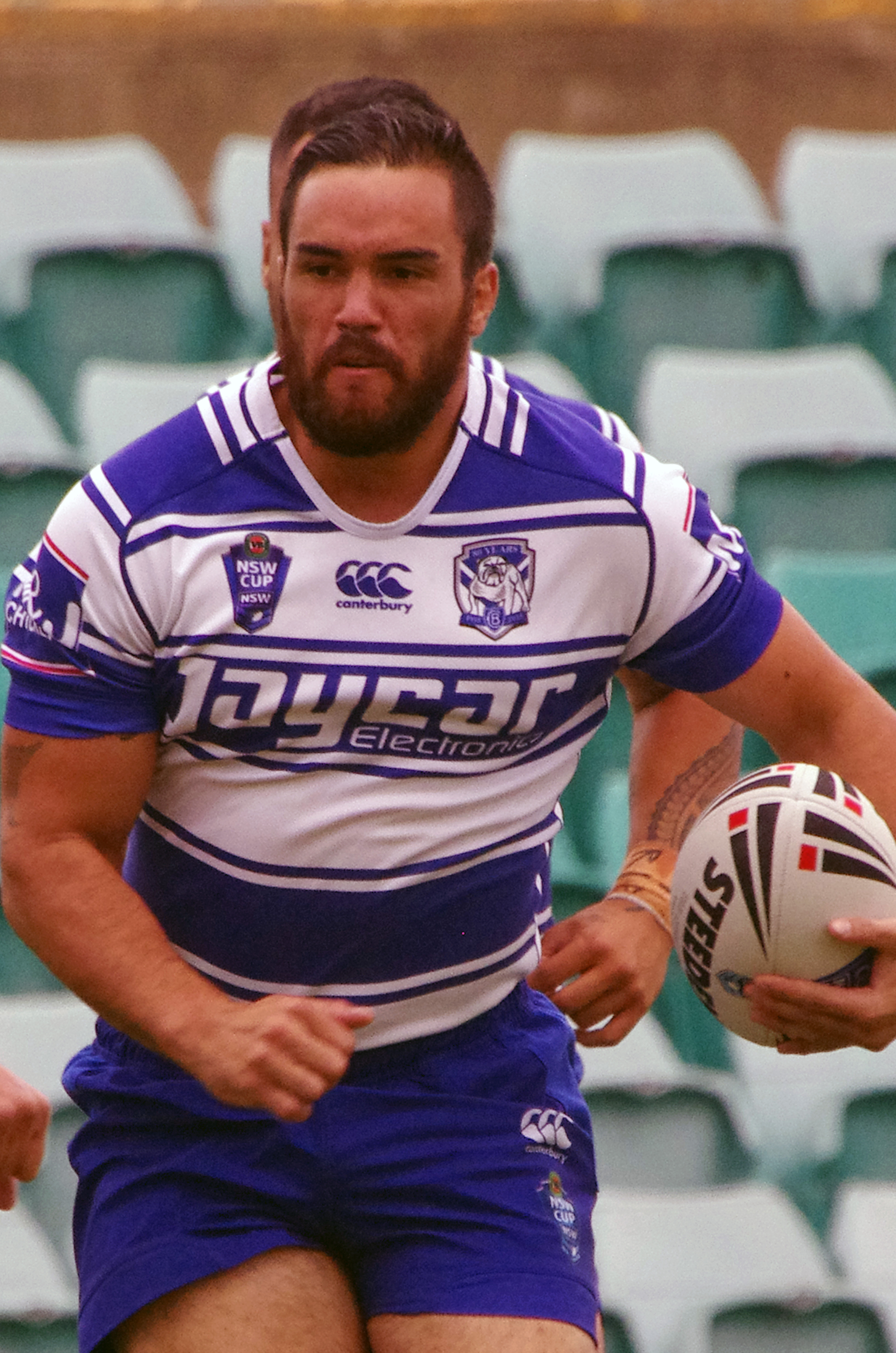
- Schirnack in 2015

Personal information
- Full name: Jason Schirnack
- Born: 27 July 1989 (age 37) Wellington, New Zealand
- Height: 185 cm (6 ft 1 in)
- Weight: 92 kg (14 st 7 lb)

Playing information
- Position: Second-row, Lock
Club
Years	Team	Pld	T	G	FG	P
2010–11	Wests Tigers	3	1	0	0	4
- Source: As of 30 January 2019
- Relatives: Alan Schirnack (brother)

Jason Schirnack (born 27 July 1989) is a New Zealand rugby league player who plays for the Rockhampton Leagues Club Capras in the local Queensland competition. He plays in the second-row. He is the brother of Alan Schirnack.

== Playing career ==
Schirnack played his first football with Te Aroha Eels before becoming a Newcastle Knights junior.

Schirnack made his first-grade with the Wests Tigers in round 2 of the 2010 season. It was his only appearance for the season, partly due to a lengthy injury. Returning to the NSW Cup with Balmain Ryde-Eastwood, Schirnack was involved in an incident where a piece of his ear was bitten off during a scuffle with an opposing player.

Near the start of the 2011 season, Schirnack made another 2 appearances from the bench, which were to be his last for the Wests Tigers club. He signed with the North Queensland Cowboys in October 2011, and played for their feeder team the Mackay Cutters in 2012.

In 2013, Schirnack played for the Mackay Cutters in the Queensland Cup and was a member of the side which won the QLD Cup that season.

In 2015, Schirnack signed with the Canterbury Bankstown Bulldogs to play in their NSW Cup side.

In 2017, Schirnack played for Newtown in the Intrust Super Premiership NSW competition.

In 2018, Schirnack signed for the Rockhampton Leagues Club Capras.
