= Matt Minto =

Australian rugby league footballer (born 1990)

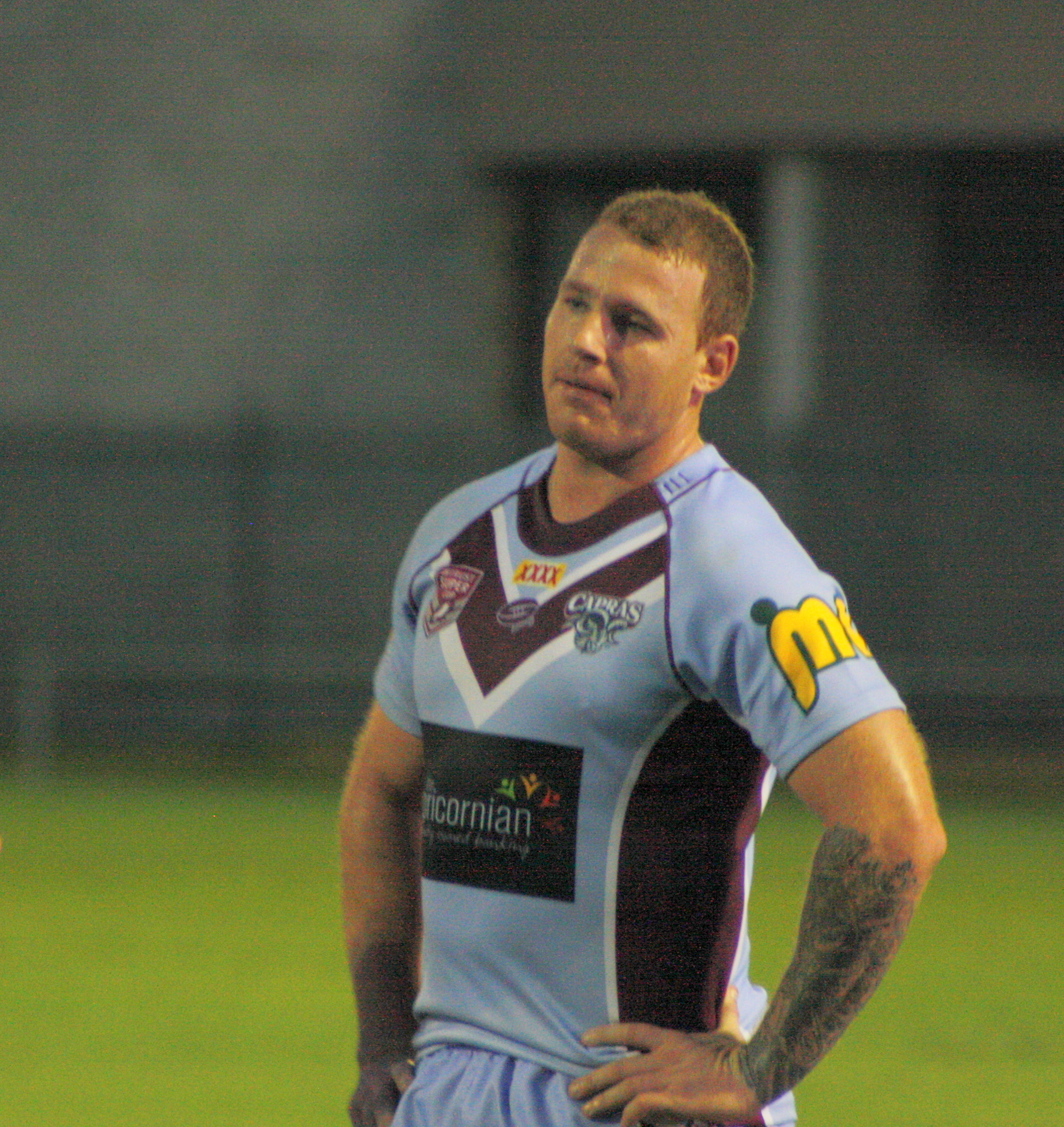
- Minto playing for the Central Queensland Capras in 2015

Personal information
- Full name: Matthew Paul Minto
- Born: 18 December 1990 (age 35) Rockhampton, Queensland, Australia
- Height: 178 cm (5 ft 10 in)
- Weight: 89 kg (14 st 0 lb)

Playing information
- Position: Halfback, Fullback
Club
Years	Team	Pld	T	G	FG	P
2014	Newcastle Knights	2	0	0	0	0
- Source: As of 21 August 2015
- Relatives: Scott Minto (uncle)

Matthew Paul Minto (born 18 December 1990) is an Australian professional rugby league footballer who has previously played for the Newcastle Knights in the National Rugby League. He also played for the Central Queensland Capras and Souths Logan Magpies in the Queensland Cup. He played at halfback and fullback.

== Playing career ==
=== Early career ===
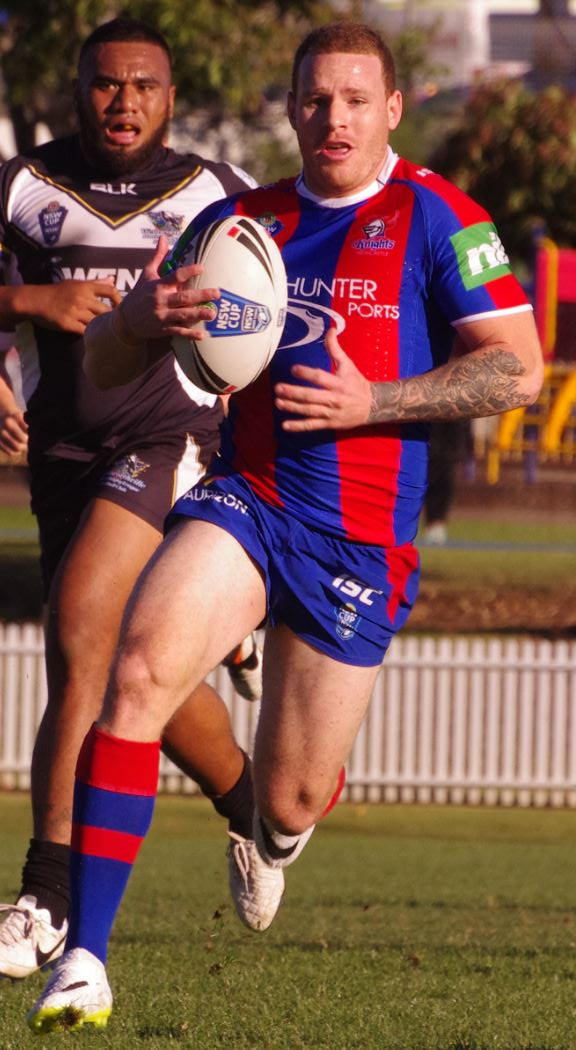
Minto playing for the Knights in 2014

Minto played his junior rugby league for the North Knights, before being signed by the Central Queensland Comets in the Queensland Cup.

At the end of 2007, Minto signed with the Penrith Panthers. He was a part of the Panthers' inaugural NYC squad in 2008, but returned to Queensland due to homesickness before he could play a game. In 2009, he signed a two-year contract with the Canterbury-Bankstown Bulldogs. He played for Canterbury's NYC team in 2009. In 2010, Minto returned to the Central Queensland Comets, after finding out his partner was pregnant, while still contracted to the Canterbury side. In 2011, he joined the Eastern Suburbs Tigers. In 2012, he joined the Mackay Cutters while doing a pre-season with the North Queensland Cowboys. After winning the Queensland Cup premiership with the Cutters in 2013, he attracted the interest of National Rugby League clubs, Newcastle Knights, North Queensland Cowboys and Wests Tigers. However, a phone call from the Newcastle Knights coach Wayne Bennett swayed him to sign a train and trial contract with the Knights. After impressing in the pre-season, his Knights contract was upgraded from train and trial to a full-time one-year contract.

=== 2015 ===
In round 2 of the 2014 NRL season, Minto made his NRL debut for Newcastle against the Canberra Raiders. At the conclusion of the 2014 NRL season, he was released by the Newcastle club. On 3 November 2014, he signed a contract with Queensland Cup team Central Queensland Capras for 2015.

=== 2016 ===
Minto continued to play for the Capras for the remainder of the 2016 season before he was released at the end of the season after he was charged with trespassing in what the Capras board described as his second off-field incident that year. He attracted offers from several NRL clubs but turned them down to stay in Queensland.

=== 2017 ===
Minto joined the Souths Logan Magpies in 2017.

== Personal life ==
Minto was born in Rockhampton, Queensland.

Minto is the nephew of former Brisbane Broncos and North Queensland Cowboys player Scott Minto.

In March 2010, Minto pleaded guilty in Yeppoon Magistrates Court to drink driving after recording a blood alcohol reading of 0.04 on the morning of 7 February 2010. At the time Minto held a provisional driver's license. He was fined $500 and disqualified from driving for five months. Minto's offending constituted a grade-two breach and a disciplinary committee at the Central Comets imposed a one-match suspension meaning Minto missed a trial game against the Gold Coast Titans. He also lost his match payment for the first round of the season and was ordered by the club to perform community service.

In September 2016, the Central Queensland Capras released Minto from his contract after he was charged with trespassing. The Capras board met after learning about the incident and decided to let Minto go due to it being the second off-field incident he had been involved in that year. Minto was fined $400 in the Rockhampton Magistrates Court on 20 September 2016, but with no conviction recorded. Minto entered a guilty plea to the charge which related to him and another person trespassing on a residential property during "Silly Sunday" and attempting to enter a woman's bedroom after earlier being told to leave the property. Due to a communication mix-up, a warrant was issued for Minto's arrest when it was initially thought he had failed to appear in court on 19 September 2019 to answer the charge. However, the warrant was later revoked when it was learnt Minto had attended the Yeppoon Magistrates Court to enter a written guilty plea because he was unable to travel to Rockhampton due to a family member being unwell. He appeared in the Rockhampton Magistrates Court the following day.

In September 2020, Minto again pleaded guilty in the Yeppoon Magistrates Court to drink driving after recorded a blood alcohol reading of 0.108 when he was intercepted by police on 17 July 2020. After the court was told Minto had no traffic history of a similar nature since 2011, he was fined $650 and disqualified from driving for five months.

In June 2024, Minto was fined for a public nuisance offence.

In late October 2024, Minto assaulted two men occasioning bodily harm in two unprovoked attacks while intoxicated in Yeppoon for which he pleaded guilty to in Rockhampton Magistrates Court on 24 January 2025. In the first incident, Minto assaulted a man at the doorway of a local hotel as he attempted to enforce a banning order whih had been imposed on Minto, prompting Minto to punch him in the face causing the man to fall. In the second incident, Minto assaulted a taxi driver after leaning forward from the back seat mid-journey and punching the driver several times upon becoming annoyed at a conversation which was taking place. According to his defence lawyer, Minto claimed he does not recall the assaults and asked about the welfare of the victims when he learned he had assaulted them. He was sentenced to a two-year probation order, ordered to complete 80 hours of community service and pay compensation and restitution to the victims. He was also banned from licensed venues in Yeppoon for 12 months. However, no convictions were recorded.
