= Michael Morgan (rugby league, born 1991) =

Australia international rugby league footballer

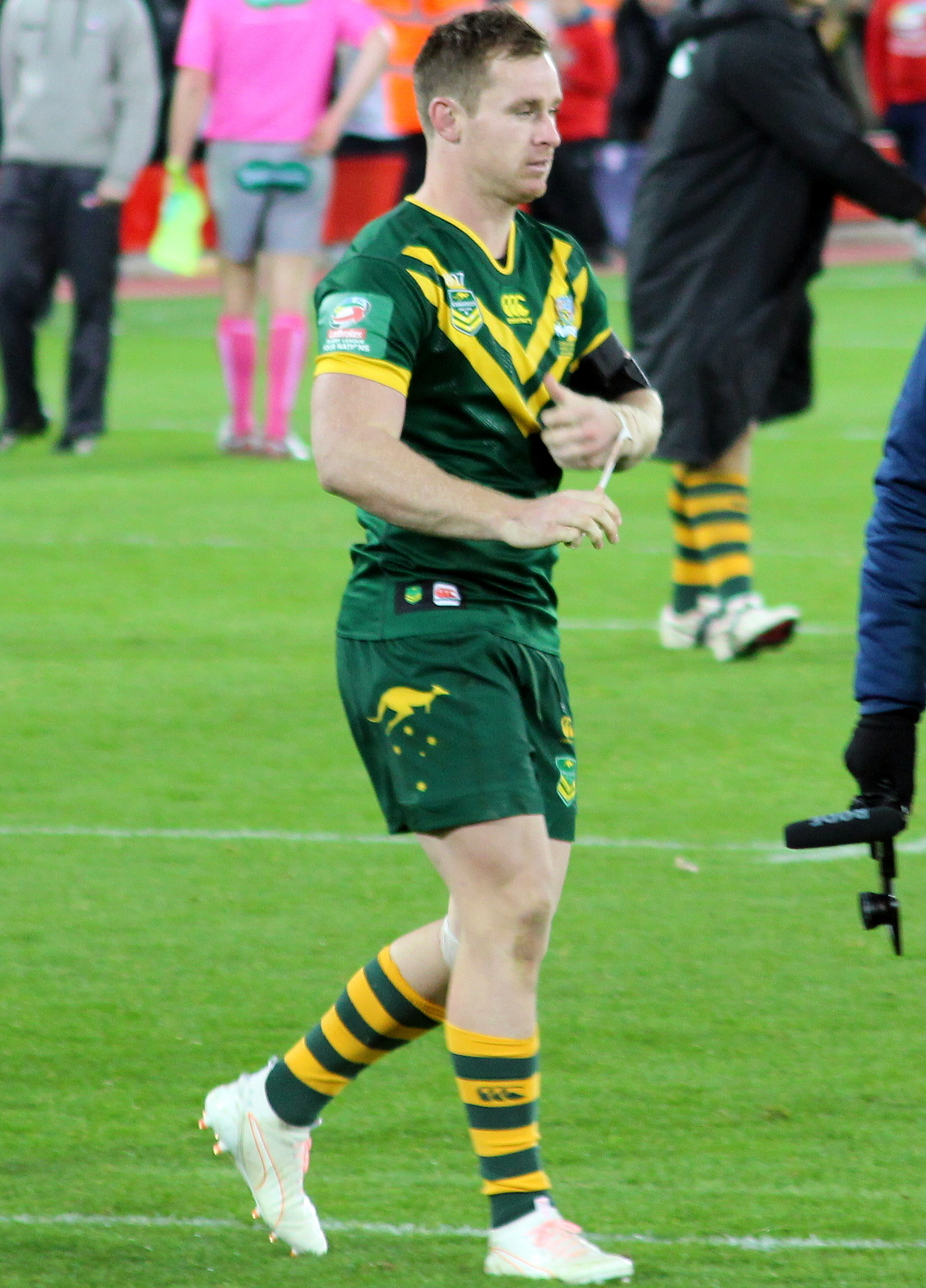

Personal information
- Full name: Michael Morgan
- Born: 27 December 1991 (age 34) Townsville, Queensland, Australia

Playing information
- Height: 185 cm (6 ft 1 in)
- Weight: 94 kg (14 st 11 lb)
- Position: Five-eighth, Halfback, Fullback
Club
Years	Team	Pld	T	G	FG	P
2010–21	North Qld Cowboys	169	59	0	5	241
Representative
Years	Team	Pld	T	G	FG	P
2014	Prime Minister's XIII	1	0	0	0	0
2015–19	Queensland	12	1	0	0	4
2016–17	Australia	12	3	0	0	12

Michael Morgan (born 27 December 1991) is an Australian former professional rugby league footballer who played in the NRL.

Morgan played as a five-eighth, halfback and fullback for the North Queensland Cowboys, winning the 2015 NRL premiership and 2016 World Club Challenge with the club. He represented Australia, Queensland and the Prime Minister's XIII, winning a World Cup with Australia in 2017.

== Background ==
Morgan was born and raised in Townsville, Queensland. He played his junior rugby league for the Townsville Brothers and attended Ignatius Park College, where he represented the Australian Schoolboys side in 2009.

== Playing career ==
=== Early career ===
In 2009, Morgan joined the North Queensland Cowboys under-20s. Later that year, he represented the Queensland under-18 team.

=== 2010 ===
In Round 9, Morgan made his NRL debut at age 18 for the North Queensland Cowboys against the Sydney Roosters, filling in at halfback for the Cowboys' captain Johnathan Thurston in the Cowboys 32–14 win at the Sydney Football Stadium. On 30 November, Morgan re-signed with the Cowboys for three years. In round 14, against the Canberra Raiders, Morgan scored his first and second NRL tries in the Cowboys 16–8 win at 1300SMILES Stadium. Morgan finished his debut year in the NRL with him playing in 4 matches and scoring 2 tries. On 30 November, Morgan re-signed with the Cowboys for three years to the end of the 2013 season.

=== 2011 ===
Morgan played in 4 matches for the Cowboys in 2011, once again filling in for Johnathan Thurston after he was ruled out for 6 weeks of the season. He spent the majority of the season in the Cowboys' NYC side, playing halfback in the Toyota Cup Grand Final against the New Zealand Warriors, which was lost 31–30 in extra time.

=== 2012 ===
In round 10, Morgan returned to first grade for the Cowboys against the Newcastle Knights. Morgan starred in the game by scoring a try and setting another up in the Cowboys 32–12 win at Hunter Stadium. From round 19 onward, Morgan cemented his halfback spot for the Cowboys after Ray Thompson suffered a shoulder injury. In week 1 of the 2012 finals series, against the Brisbane Broncos, Morgan became the first halfback in the history of the NRL/ARL/NSWRL to score a hat-trick of tries in a finals match in the Cowboys 33–16 win at 1300SMILES Stadium. Morgan played in 13 matches and scored 4 tries in the 2012.

=== 2013 ===
On 9 February 2013, Morgan captained the Cowboys to a 28–24 victory over the Brisbane Broncos in a trial match. He scored a try and set up another in the win. On 10 April, Morgan re-signed with the Cowboys for a further two years. Later that month, Morgan was given three weeks off from first grade duty after the death of best-friend and Cowboys teammate Alex Elisala. Morgan spent most of the year playing with the Mackay Cutters. They won the Queensland Cup Grand Final against the Easts Tigers 27–20, with Morgan dedicating a try to Elisala. Morgan only played 9 matches and scored 2 tries in 2013. In September, Morgan admitted he had stood himself the NRL from being emotionally drained from the death of Elisala.

=== 2014 ===
In 2014, Morgan shifted to fullback for the Cowboys after new signing Lachlan Coote tore his anterior cruciate ligament during the club's Auckland Nines tournament. Due to his form at fullback, he was called into Queensland's State of Origin squad as 19th man for Game III of the 2014 State of Origin series. Following an impressive season at fullback for the Cowboys, including two finals appearances, Morgan was selected on the interchange bench for the Prime Minister's XIII team which defeated Papua New Guinea 34–16 in Kokopo. Morgan spent time at hooker and lock during the game. He finished the 2014 NRL season with him playing in all of the Cowboys 26 matches and scoring a career-high 10 tries.

At the end of 2014, Morgan was named the Cowboys members' player of the year and the most improved player.

=== 2015 ===
In January, Morgan was named in the QAS Emerging Origin squad for the third year in a row. On 27 January 2015, Morgan was named in the Cowboys 2015 NRL Auckland Nines squad. After starting the first two rounds of the season at fullback, Morgan shifted to five-eighth in round 3 against the Brisbane Broncos in the Cowboys 44–22 loss. In round 10, against the Broncos, Morgan scored a hat-trick of tries in a man of the match performance in which the Cowboys won 31–20. Following the return of Lachlan Coote from injury, Michael Morgan shifted to five eighth. North Queensland's spine was instrumental in their success during the 2015 season, with Lachlan Coote, Johnathan Thurston, Morgan, and Jake Granville being named NRL.com's #1 playmaking spine for 2015. After scoring five tries in two weeks, Morgan was called into the Queensland State of Origin team for game I of the 2015 State of Origin series, after Daly Cherry-Evans was ruled out with an elbow injury. Morgan came off the interchange bench in Queensland's 11–10 victory. In Game III of the series, Morgan scored a try with just his third touch of the football and set up two others in Queensland's 52–6 win over New South Wales.

On 4 October 2015, Morgan was a member of the Cowboys' Grand Final winning side, starting at five-eighth in the side's 17–16 victory over the Brisbane Broncos. On the last play of the game, with the Cowboys down by four points, Morgan combined with Johnathan Thurston in-setting up a try to right winger Kyle Feldt when he ran from 20 out, drew three Broncos defenders and got away a one-handed flick pass to send the winger over for the match-tying try and sending the game into extra time. Morgan finished his barnstorming 2015 NRL season for Cowboys with him playing in 23 matches and scoring 15 tries.

=== 2016 ===
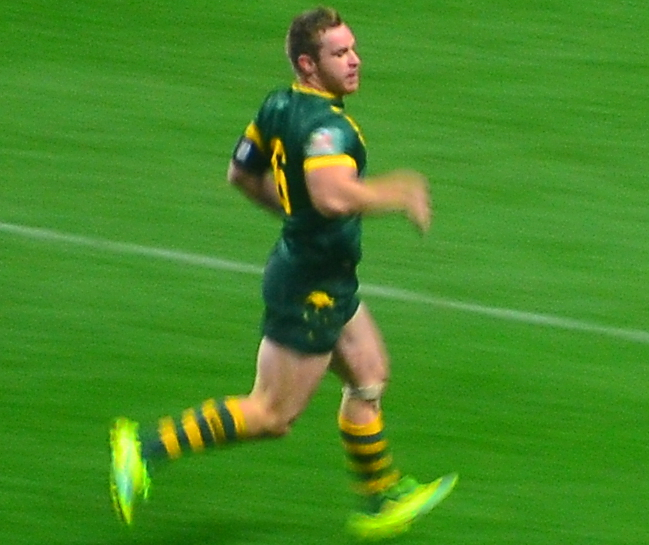
Morgan playing for Australia in 2016

In February, Morgan played in the Cowboys 2016 Auckland Nines squad. He was then a member of the Cowboys' World Club Challenge winning side, starting at five-eighth and scoring the first try of the match in the match against Leeds Rhinos. After a great start to the season, on 6 May, Morgan was selected to make his international debut for Australia against New Zealand, where he played off the interchange bench in the 16–0 win at Hunter Stadium. Morgan came off the bench for Queensland during games I & II of the 2016 State of Origin series before being ruled out of game III. Morgan returned in round 20 against the Canterbury Bulldogs, putting in a man of the match performance.

On 16 September, Morgan played his 100th NRL game, scoring the match winning try against the Brisbane Broncos in the club's 26–20 elimination semi-final victory.

On 4 October, Morgan was selected in Australia's Four Nations squad. He scored his first test try in Australia's 54–12 over Scotland at KCOM Lightstream Stadium.

=== 2017 ===
Morgan started the season as usual, playing at Five-Eighth. With his halves partner Johnathan Thurston having injury issues/problems throughout the majority of the season; he spent time featuring at halfback, taking-on an extra responsible role in-steering and directing the team around the field.

In Game 2 of the State of Origin Series, Morgan came off the bench to replace the injured Will Chambers at right-centre. He would set up the match-winning try to winger Dane Gagai, leading to Johnathan Thurston to kick the winning goal, giving Queensland an 18–16 win to level the series.

Following a season-ending shoulder injury to Thurston, Morgan took over the halfback position for the remainder of the 2017 season.

Leading into the Origin decider (Game 3 of the 2017 State of Origin Series), he was the leading candidate to play at Five-Eighth (in replacing Johnathan Thurston). Despite this, coach Kevin Walters selected Melbourne Storm player Cameron Munster to play in that Five-Eighth role which resulted Morgan being selected at centre for the 3rd game of the State of Origin series. This was his first ever start in the position at First Grade level, and his first start in State of Origin. Playing at centre in the 3rd game (the decider), he produced a fine performance in QLD's 22–6 win over NSW at Suncorp Stadium.

With Thurston still injured and out of the action; Morgan continued-on with his fine consistency performance at Halfback, leading into the NRL play-offs. In week 1 of the Final Series, he guided the Cowboys to a tough narrow 15–14 win over the Cronulla Sharks at Allianz Stadium, kicking a field goal in extra-time . The following week, he then went-on playing a key role in the Cowboys' 24–16 win over the Parramatta Eels at ANZ Stadium. In the Grand Final qualifier match against the Roosters at Allianz Stadium (on 23 September), he produced an outstanding performance in the Cowboys to a 29–16 win, guiding the team to the Grand Final.

After a successful 2017 season in which the Cowboys made a Grand Final appearance and he won the Dally M Halfback of the Year award, Morgan was named in Australia's 24 man squad for the 2017 Rugby League World Cup. He would continue to play in the Five-Eighth position for Australia in the opening game of the tournament against England where Australia won 18–4, and again in the 2017 final against England.

=== 2018 ===
The 2018 NRL season was a slow start for Morgan, missing the first two games of the season due to injury. After returning from injury he played at Five-Eighth and Fullback, making way for Johnathan Thurston to play Halfback for the Cowboys. He struggled to find the form that he had in 2017 and as a result both he and the Cowboys had a disappointing beginning to the season.

Come State of Origin, there were doubts Morgan would be picked for the Maroons due to his current form, but was still picked to play off the bench against the NSW Blues in game I. Leading in to game I of State of Origin, Maroons No.1 Billy Slater pulled out of the game because of a hamstring complaint, making way for Morgan to play Fullback. Morgan had a solid game, but still lost 22–12 to the Blues.

On returning to the Cowboys, it was revealed that Morgan was carrying a groin issue which was restricting his movement and required surgery at the end of the season. Morgan's season would encounter a huge blow when he injured his bicep against the NZ Warriors, which would require surgery and end his season prematurely.

=== 2019 ===
On 8 March 2019, Morgan was named captain of the Cowboys, replacing Matt Scott and the recently retired Johnathan Thurston. In Round 10, Morgan played his 150th NRL game in the Cowboys' 17–10 win over the Parramatta Eels. In June, he started at centre in two State of Origin games for Queensland. In the third game of the series, he was concussed after colliding with teammate Josh McGuire. The concussion was Morgan's second in 13 days and saw him miss two NRL games. He returned in the Cowboys' Round 20 loss to the Wests Tigers. In his first season as captain, Morgan played 20 games, as the Cowboys missed the finals for the second straight year.

=== 2020 ===
After playing the first two games of the season, Morgan underwent shoulder surgery during the NRL's 10-week shutdown, ruling him out for up to month ahead of the competition's return on 28 May. He returned from injury in the Cowboys' Round 13 loss to the Gold Coast Titans. In Round 14, he scored two tries in a 30–31 loss to the South Sydney Rabbitohs. In Round 16, Morgan tore his calf in a loss to the Cronulla Sharks, which ruled him out for the rest of the season.

=== 2021 ===
Morgan returned from his shoulder injury in Round 1 of the 2021 NRL season, a 24–0 loss to the Penrith Panthers. Following the Cowboys' Round 2 loss to the St George Illawarra Dragons, Morgan was indefinitely ruled out due to soreness to his surgically repaired shoulder.

On 9 April, Morgan announced his immediate retirement from rugby league due to his injured shoulder.

== Achievements and accolades ==
=== Individual ===
- Dally M Halfback of the Year: 2017
- North Queensland Cowboys Players' Player of the Year: 2017
- North Queensland Cowboys Members' Player of the Year: 2014, 2017
- North Queensland Cowboys Coach's Award: 2017
- North Queensland Cowboys Most Improved: 2014

== Statistics ==
=== NRL ===
Statistics are correct to the end of the 2021 season

†	Denotes seasons in which Morgan won an NRL Premiership

Season	Team	Matches	T	G	GK %	F/G	Pts
2010	North Queensland	4	2	0	—	0	8
2011	North Queensland	4	0	0	—	0	0
2012	North Queensland	13	4	0	—	0	16
2013	North Queensland	9	2	0	0.0	0	8
2014	North Queensland	26	10	0	—	0	40
2015†	North Queensland	23	15	0	—	0	60
2016	North Queensland	22	9	0	—	0	36
2017	North Queensland	25	11	0	—	2	46
2018	North Queensland	11	1	0	—	1	5
2019	North Queensland	20	2	0	—	1	9
2020	North Queensland	6	2	0	—	0	8
2021	North Queensland	2	0	0	—	0	0
Career totals		168	58	0	0.0	5	237

=== International ===
†	Denotes years in which Morgan won a World Cup Title
†	Denotes years in which Morgan won a Four Nations Title

Season	Team	Matches	T	G	GK %	F/G	Pts
2016†	Australia	6	1	0	—	0	4
2017†	Australia	6	2	0	—	0	8
Career totals		12	3	0	—	0	12

=== State of Origin ===
†	Denotes years in which Morgan won a State of Origin Series

Season	Team	Matches	T	G	GK %	F/G	Pts
2015†	Queensland	3	1	0	—	0	4
2016†	Queensland	2	0	0	—	0	0
2017†	Queensland	3	0	0	—	0	0
2018	Queensland	1	0	0	—	0	0
2019	Queensland	3	0	0	—	0	0
Career totals		12	1	0	—	0	4

== Post career ==
Morgan was assistant coach at the Townsville Blackhawks under head coach Aaron Payne for the 2023 season.

== Personal life ==
Morgan and his wife, Brianna, have a daughter named Penelope.

Morgan's great-grandfather, Duncan McIvor, played for Queensland in 1915, 100 years before Morgan made his debut for Queensland.
