= 2010 Mackay Cutters season =

- Queensland Cup rank: 6th
- Play-off result: Lost preliminary final
- 2010 record: Wins: 11; draws: 1; losses: 10
- Points scored: For: 544; against: 491

Team information
- Coach: Paul Bramley
- Captain: Jardine Bobongie
- Stadium: Mackay Junior Rugby League Grounds

Top scorers
- Tries: Justin Hunt; Donald Malone (12)
- Goals: Justin Hunt (53)
- Points: Justin Hunt (154)
← 2009	2011 →

The 2010 Mackay Cutters season was the third in the club's history. Coached by Paul Bramley and captained by Jardine Bobongie, they competed in the QRL's Intrust Super Cup. The club qualified for the finals for the first time in their history, falling one game short of the Grand Final.

== Season summary ==
Paul Bramley, formerly of the Souths Logan Magpies, became the Cutters second head coach after the departure of Shane Muspratt. Muspratt, who retired as a player at the end of 2008, returned to the club as a player in 2010. Key signings for the club included Welsh international Neil Budworth, former Queensland representative Josh Hannay and North Sydney Bears New South Wales Cup utility Justin Hunt.

The club enjoyed their best season to date in 2010, winning 11 games in the regular season and finishing in sixth place, qualifying for the finals for the first time. In their first finals game, the Cutters upset the Sunshine Coast Sea Eagles 14–4 before losing to the Norths Devils 12–56 in the preliminary final. Prop Liam McDonald, a new recruit from Souths Logan, was named the club's Player of the Year, while North Queensland Cowboys contracted centre Donald Malone was selected for the Queensland Residents side.

=== Milestones ===
- Round 13: The club scored 50 points for the first time.
- Round 22: The club qualified for their first finals series.

== Squad List ==
=== 2010 squad ===
Mackay Cutters
First team squad			Coaching staff
Khan Ahwang – FB, WG; Jardine Bobongie (c) – SR, LK; Neil Budworth – HK; Craig Chapman – HB; Michael Comerford – CE, WG; Zac Dalton – PR; Luke Fatnowna – PR; Daniel Flynn – FB; Chris Giumelli – WG; Darren Griffiths – SR	Josh Hannay – CE; Justin Hunt – FB, HB; Regan Hyde – PR; Jerome Iakimo – LK; Tyson Martin – CE, SR; Liam McDonald – PR; Jamie McIvor – SR; Michael Meigan – FE; Grant Moore – LK, SR; Shane Muspratt – FE, LK	Peter Quinn – LK; Josh Roveli – PR; Todd Seymour – HB, FE; Dean Tass – CE; Todd Titmus – SR; Ross Turi – PR; Luke Young – FE, FB	Head coach: Paul Bramley; Legend: (c) Captain(s); (vc) Vice-captain(s)

The following players contracted to the North Queensland Cowboys played for the Cutters in 2010: Mitchell Achurch, Isaak Ah Mau, Leeson Ah Mau, Shannon Gallant, Obe Geia, Ben Harris, Antonio Kaufusi, Donald Malone, Grant Rovelli and Arana Taumata.

== Squad movement ==
=== Gains ===
Player	Signed From	Until End of	Notes
Neil Budworth	Celtic Crusaders	2010	
Zac Dalton	Central Coast Storm	2010	
Luke Fatnowna	Central Comets	2010	
Josh Hannay	Celtic Crusaders	2010	
Justin Hunt	North Sydney Bears	2010	
Tyson Martin	North Queensland Cowboys	2010	
Liam McDonald	Souths Logan Magpies	2010	
Shane Muspratt	Retirement	2010	
Peter Quinn	Canberra Raiders	2010	
Todd Titmus	Central Comets	2010	

=== Losses ===
Player	Signed To	Until End of	Notes
Daniel Abraham	Central Coast Centurions	2010	
Roy Baira	Townsville Brothers	2010	
Chance Bunce	Released	–	
Quinton Fielder	Released	–	
Sam Granville	Released	–	
Peter Hassall	Released	–	
Quinton Mitchell	Townsville Brothers	2010	
Troy Paget	Released	–	

== Fixtures ==
=== Regular season ===
Date	Round	Opponent	Venue	Score	Tries	Goals
Saturday, 13 March	Round 1	Central Comets	Browne Park	10 – 20	Achurch, Geia	Hunt (1)
Saturday, 1 May*	Round 2	Easts Tigers	Mackay JRL Grounds	18 – 16	Bobongie, Fatnowna, Hunt	Hunt (3)
Sunday, 28 March	Round 3	Redcliffe Dolphins	Mackay JRL Grounds	18 – 25	L. Ah Mau, Gallant, Hunt	Hunt (3)
Saturday, 3 April	Round 4	Norths Devils	Bishop Park	24 – 54	Flynn, Giumelli, Griffiths, Rovelli	Hunt (4)
Saturday, 10 April	Round 5	Burleigh Bears	Pizzey Park	36 – 10	Martin (2), Achurch, Griffiths, Malone, Muspratt	Hunt (6)
Saturday, 17 April	Round 6	Northern Pride	Barlow Park	16 – 20	Hunt, Malone, Rovelli	Hunt (2)
Saturday, 24 April	Round 7	Wynnum Manly Seagulls	Mackay JRL Grounds	26 – 16	Comerford, Giumelli, Griffiths, Hunt, Kaufusi	Hunt (3)
Sunday, 9 May	Round 8	Souths Logan Magpies	Davies Park	18 – 28	Hunt (2), Griffiths	Hunt (3)
Saturday, 15 May	Round 9	Tweed Heads Seagulls	Ned Byrne Field	30 – 36	Comerford, Griffiths, Hunt, Martin, Meigan	Hunt (5)
Saturday, 22 May	Round 10	Ipswich Jets	North Ipswich Reserve	20 – 6	Martin (2), Bobongie, Seymour	Hunt (1), Seymour (1)
Sunday, 30 May	Round 11	Sunshine Coast Sea Eagles	Mackay JRL Grounds	40 – 26	Rovelli (2), Comerford, Fatnowna, Martin, Malone, Quinn	Gallant (5), Seymour (1)
Sunday, 6 June	Round 12	Central Comets	Mackay JRL Grounds	48 – 12	Hunt (2), Malone (2), Seymour (2), Bobongie, Comerford, Giumelli	Hunt (6)
Saturday, 12 June	Round 13	Easts Tigers	Langlands Park	50 – 20	Comerford (2), Hunt (2), Malone (2), Geia, Rovelli, Seymour	Hunt (7)
Saturday, 19 June	Round 14	Redcliffe Dolphins	Dolphin Oval	22 – 16	Martin (2), Fatnowna, Rovelli	Hunt (3)
Sunday, 4 July	Round 15	Norths Devils	Mackay JRL Grounds	26 – 28	I. Ah Mau, Ahwang, Comerford, Griffiths, Taumata	Hannay (3)
Saturday, 10 July	Round 16	Burleigh Bears	Mackay JRL Grounds	28 – 22	Malone (2), Giumelli, Meigan, Seymour	Hunt (4)
Sunday, 18 July	Round 17	Northern Pride	Mackay JRL Grounds	16 – 22	Fatnowna, Giumelli, Hunt	Hunt (2)
Sunday, 25 July	Round 18	Wynnum Manly Seagulls	BMD Kougari Oval	28 – 16	I. Ah Mau, Gallant, Giumelli, Rovelli, Seymour	Hannay (4)
Sunday, 1 August	Round 19	Souths Logan Magpies	Mackay JRL Grounds	10 – 34	Comerford, Griffiths	Hannay (1)
Saturday, 14 August	Round 20	Tweed Heads Seagulls	Mackay JRL Grounds	18 – 18	Malone (2), Muspratt	Hannay (3)
Saturday, 21 August	Round 21	Ipswich Jets	Mackay JRL Grounds	30 – 6	Fatnowna (2), Giumelli, Griffiths, Seymour	Hannay (5)
Sunday, 29 August	Round 22	Sunshine Coast Sea Eagles	Stockland Park	12 – 40	Giumelli, Muspratt	Hannay (2)
Legend: Win Loss Draw Bye

=== Finals ===
Date	Round	Opponent	Venue	Score	Tries	Goals
Saturday, 4 September	Semi Final	Sunshine Coast Sea Eagles	Stockland Park	14 – 4	Comerford, Malone, Martin	Hannay (1)
Saturday, 11 September	Preliminary Final	Norths Devils	Bishop Park	12 – 56	Giumelli, Harris	Hannay (2)
Legend: Win Loss Draw Bye

== Statistics ==
*	Denotes player contracted to the North Queensland Cowboys for the 2010 season

Name	T	G	FG	Pts
Mitchell Achurch	2	-	-	8
Isaak Ah Mau	2	-	-	8
Leeson Ah Mau	1	-	-	4
Khan Ahwang	1	-	-	4
Jardine Bobongie	3	-	-	12
Michael Comerford	9	-	-	36
Luke Fatnowna	6	-	-	24
Daniel Flynn	1	-	-	4
Shannon Gallant	2	5	-	18
Obe Geia	2	-	-	8
Chris Giumelli	9	-	-	36
Darren Griffiths	8	-	-	32
Josh Hannay	-	21	-	42
Ben Harris	1	-	-	4
Justin Hunt	12	53	-	154
Antonio Kaufusi	1	-	-	4
Donald Malone	12	-	-	48
Tyson Martin	9	-	-	36
Michael Meigan	2	-	-	8
Shane Muspratt	3	-	-	12
Peter Quinn	1	-	-	4
Grant Rovelli	7	-	-	28
Todd Seymour	7	2	-	32
Arana Taumata	1	-	-	4
Totals	102	81	0	570

== Honours ==
=== Club ===
- Player of the Year: Liam McDonald
- Sponsor's Player of the Year: Neil Budworth
- Rookie of the Year: Tyson Martin
- Club Person of the Year: Carolyn Craig
