= 2009 Mackay Cutters season =

- Queensland Cup rank: 12th
- Play-off result: Missed finals
- 2009 record: Wins: 7; draws: 1; losses: 14
- Points scored: For: 315; against: 541

Team information
- Coach: Shane Muspratt
- Captain: Jardine Bobongie
- Stadium: Mackay Junior Rugby League Grounds

Top scorers
- Tries: Anthony Perkins (8)
- Goals: Daniel Abraham (28)
- Points: Daniel Abraham (68)
← 2008	2010 →

The 2009 Mackay Cutters season was the second in the club's history. Coached by Shane Muspratt and captained by Jardine Bobongie, they competed in the QRL's Wizard Cup. The club finished the season in 14th, last place, winning the wooden spoon.

== Season summary ==
The 2009 season started strongly for the Cutters, with three straight wins before a run of nine straight losses sunk them to the bottom of the table. A 10–34 loss to the Tweed Heads Seagulls in the final game of the regular season saw them finish last on points differential. Local junior Jardine Bobongie joined the club in 2009 and won their Player of the Year award after spending the 2008 season playing for the St George Illawarra Dragons' New South Wales Cup side. He would go on to play an influential role in their maiden premiership four years later, captaining the side in the Grand Final victory. 2009 saw the Cutters have their first Queensland Residents representative, with North Queensland Cowboys contracted prop Dayne Weston being selected in the side.

=== Milestones ===
- Round 3: The club recorded their sixth straight win, the club's longest winning streak.

== Squad List ==
=== 2009 squad ===
Mackay Cutters
First team squad			Coaching staff
Daniel Abraham – FE; Roy Baira – HK; Tony Beaumont – SR; Jardine Bobongie (c) – LK; Craig Bowering – PR; Chance Bunce – FB; Craig Chapman – HB; Michael Comerford – WG; Quinton Fielder – PR; Daniel Flynn – FB; Chris Giumelli – WG	Sam Granville – CE; Kaylib Gray – SR; Matt Griffin – FB, HB; Darren Griffiths – SR; Peter Hassall – CE; Dan Hill – SR; Regan Hyde – PR; Jerome Iakimo – LK; Royston Lightning – CE, LK; Quinton Mitchell – SR; Grant Moore – LK	Kelvin Nielsen – SR; Troy Paget – CE; Tom Parker – SR; Josh Rovelli – PR; Todd Seymour – HB, FE; Bennett Smith – SR; Luke Srama – HK; Dean Tass – CE, WG; Dean Vogel – PR; Adam Walker – PR; Luke Young – FE, FB	Head coach: Shane Muspratt; Legend: (c) Captain(s); (vc) Vice-captain(s)

The following players contracted to the North Queensland Cowboys played for the Cutters in 2009: Mitchell Achurch, Ben Farrar, Ben Harris, Shannon Hegarty, Antonio Kaufusi, Donald Malone, Anthony Perkins, Steve Rapira, Grant Rovelli, Anthony Watts and Dayne Weston.

== Squad movement ==
=== Gains ===
Player	Signed From	Until end of	Notes
Daniel Abraham	North Queensland Cowboys	2009	
Roy Baira	Townsville Brothers	2009	
Jardine Bobongie	St George Illawarra Dragons	2009	
Craig Bowering	Melbourne Storm	2009	
Chance Bunce	Cronulla-Sutherland Sharks	2009	
Craig Chapman	Souths Logan Magpies	2009	
Kaylib Gray	Ipswich Jets	2009	
Darren Griffiths	Charters Towers Miners	2009	
Quinton Mitchell	Townsville Brothers	2009	
Troy Paget	Gold Coast Titans	2009	

=== Losses ===
Player	Signed To	Until end of	Notes
Jamie McDonald	Retired	–	
Shane Muspratt	Retired	–	
Cody Norton	Sunshine Coast Sea Eagles	2009	
Adam Schubert	Released	–	
Kerrod Toby	Retired	–	

== Fixtures ==
=== Regular season ===
Date	Round	Opponent	Venue	Score	Tries	Goals
Saturday, 14 March	Round 1	Ipswich Jets	Briggs Rd Sporting Complex	18–16	Fielder, Griffiths, Lightning	Abraham (3)
Saturday, 21 March	Round 2	Easts Tigers	Mackay JRL Grounds	34–18	Lightning (2), Abraham, Baira, Bobongie, Seymour	Abraham (5)
Saturday, 28 March	Round 3	Sunshine Coast Sea Eagles	Stockland Park	22–16	Perkins (2), Fielder, Lightning, Malone	Abraham (1)
Saturday, 4 April	Round 4	Burleigh Bears	Pizzey Park	6–15	Hegarty	Abraham (1)
Sunday, 12 April	Round 5	Wynnum Manly Seagulls	BMD Kougari Oval	26–24	Bobongie, Farrar, Fielder, Griffiths, Perkins	Abraham (3)
Saturday, 18 April	Round 6	Redcliffe Dolphins	Dolphin Oval	12–22	Bobongie, Lightning	Abraham (2)
Saturday, 25 April	Round 7	Norths Devils	Mackay JRL Grounds	12–28	Bunce, Lightning	Abraham (2)
Saturday, 2 May	Round 8	Central Comets	Browne Park	6–50	Abraham	Abraham (1)
Saturday, 9 May	Round 9	Northern Pride	Barlow Park	16–34	Abraham, Bobongie, Watts	Abraham (2)
Saturday, 16 May	Round 10	Souths Logan Magpies	Mackay JRL Grounds	10–44	Malone, Paget	Abraham (1)
Saturday, 23 May	Round 11	Tweed Heads Seagulls	Mackay JRL Grounds	20–26	Flynn, Harris, Malone, Perkins	Abraham 2)
Saturday, 30 May	Round 12	Ipswich Jets	Mackay JRL Grounds	0–30		
Saturday, 6 June	Round 13	Easts Tigers	Langlands Park	12–18	Bunce, Tass	Abraham (2)
Saturday, 20 June	Round 14	Sunshine Coast Sea Eagles	Mackay JRL Grounds	22–26	Tass (2), Perkins, Seymour	Abraham (3)
Saturday, 27 June	Round 15	Burleigh Bears	Pizzey Park	10–4	Flynn, Griffin	Malone (1)
Saturday, 10 July	Round 16	Wynnum Manly Seagulls	Mackay JRL Grounds	22–14	Moore, Perkins, Seymour, Tass	Malone (3)
Saturday, 18 July	Round 17	Redcliffe Dolphins	Mackay JRL Grounds	6–6	Griffin	Malone (1)
Sunday, 26 July	Round 18	Norths Devils	Bishop Park	12–40	Bobongie, Rovelli	Malone (2)
Sunday, 2 August	Round 19	Central Comets	Mackay JRL Grounds	16–28	Fielder, Flynn, Weston	Malone (2)
Sunday, 9 August	Round 20	Northern Pride	Mackay JRL Grounds	17–16	Flynn, Perkins, Srama	Chapman (2, 1 FG)
Sunday, 16 August	Round 21	Souths Logan Magpies	Davies Park	6–40	Flynn	Chapman (1)
Saturday, 22 August	Round 22	Tweed Heads Seagulls	Ned Byrne Field	10–34	Malone, Perkins	Malone (1)
Legend: Win Loss Draw Bye

== Statistics ==
*	Denotes player contracted to the North Queensland Cowboys for the 2009 season

Name	T	G	FG	Pts
Daniel Abraham	3	28	-	68
Roy Baira	1	-	-	4
Jardine Bobongie	5	-	-	28
Chance Bunce	2	-	-	8
Craig Chapman	-	3	1	7
Ben Farrar	1	-	-	4
Quinton Fielder	4	-	-	16
Daniel Flynn	5	-	-	20
Matt Griffin	2-	-	-	8
Darren Griffiths	2	-	-	8
Ben Harris	1	-	-	4
Shannon Hegarty	1	-	-	4
Royston Lightning	6	-	-	24
Donald Malone	4	10	-	36
Grant Moore	1	-	-	4
Troy Paget	1	-	-	4
Anthony Perkins	8	-	-	32
Josh Rovelli	1	-	-	4
Todd Seymour	3	-	-	12
Luke Srama	1	-	-	4
Dean Tass	4	-	-	16
Anthony Watts	1	-	-	4
Dayne Weston	1	-	-	4
Totals	58	41	0	315

== Honours ==
=== Club ===
- Player of the Year: Jardine Bobongie
- Sponsor's Player of the Year: Jardine Bobongie
- Rookie of the Year: Darren Griffiths
- Club Person of the Year: Tony Gambie
