= 2011 Mackay Cutters season =

- Queensland Cup rank: 9th
- Play-off result: Missed finals
- 2011 record: Wins: 8; draws: 1; losses: 13
- Points scored: For: 369; against: 473

Team information
- Coach: Anthony Seibold
- Captain: Grant Rovelli
- Stadium: Virgin Australia Stadium; Shark Park Mackay

Top scorers
- Tries: Michael Comerford (9)
- Goals: Liam Taylor (48)
- Points: Liam Taylor (104)
← 2010	2012 →

The 2011 Mackay Cutters season was the fourth in the club's history. Coached by Anthony Seibold and captained by Grant Rovelli, they competed in the QRL's Intrust Super Cup. The club missed the finals in 2011, finishing the season in ninth.

== Season summary ==
The Cutters entered the 2011 season with a new head coach after Paul Bramley, who led the club to their first finals series in 2010, left the club to join the Burleigh Bears. He was replaced by former Canberra Raiders and London Broncos prop Anthony Seibold. Seibold was an assistant at the Celtic Crusaders from 2006 to 2009 and head coach of the South Wales Scorpions, helping them gain promotion in 2010. The club's biggest recruit for the season was former New Zealand Warriors and North Queensland Cowboys halfback Grant Rovelli, who was named captain of the side.

The Cutters endured a horror injury run in 2011, having to use 43 different players during the season, and finished ninth on the ladder. Lewis Balcomb, a new recruit from Souths Logan, was named the club's Player of the Year, while Rovelli was selected for the Queensland Residents side. The club began playing out of their new home ground, Stadium Mackay, late in the 2011 season.

== Squad List ==
=== 2011 squad ===
Mackay Cutters
First team squad			Coaching staff
Tyson Andrews – PR; Lewis Balcomb – PR; Cruse Bickey – WG; Janan Billings – HK; Jardine Bobongie – LK; Neil Budworth – HK; Michael Comerford – CE, WG; Zac Dalton – PR; Bureta Faraimo – WG; Luke Fatnowna – PR	Peter Gallen – PR; Chris Giumelli – WG; Darren Griffiths – SR; Chad Grintell – CE; Peter Hassall – WG; Damon Koolstra – HB; Justin McKay – FE; Michael Meigan – FE; Grant Moore – SR; Kelvin Nielsen – SR	Brandon Nixon – WG; Kailem Perkins – SR; Peter Quinn – SR; Liam Roach – SR; Grant Rovelli (c) – FE, HB; Todd Seymour – HB, FE; Liam Taylor – FB; Ross Turi – PR; Andrew Ward – PR; Luke Young – CE	Head coach: Anthony Seibold; Legend: (c) Captain(s); (vc) Vice-captain(s)

The following players contracted to the North Queensland Cowboys played for the Cutters in 2011: Isaak Ah Mau, Leeson Ah Mau, Clint Amos, Sam Foster, Shannon Gallant, Dane Hogan, Ben Jones, Tyson Martin, Dylan Smith and Will Tupou.

== Squad movement ==
=== Gains ===
Player	Signed from	Until end of	Notes
Lewis Balcomb	Souths Logan Magpies	2011	
Bureta Faraimo	Wainuiomata Lions	2011	
Peter Gallen	Cronulla-Sutherland Sharks	2011	
Chad Grintell	Burleigh Bears	2011	
Peter Hassall	Year off	2011	
Brandon Nixon	Warriors	2011	
Liam Roach	South Wales Scorpions	2011	
Grant Rovelli	North Queensland Cowboys	2011	
Liam Taylor	West Belconnen Warriors	2011	

=== Losses ===
Player	Signed To	Until end of	Notes
Khan Ahwang	Ipswich Jets	2011	
Craig Chapman	Released	–	
Matt Griffin	Released	–	
Josh Hannay	Moranbah Miners	2011	
Justin Hunt	Redcliffe Dolphins	2011	
Regan Hyde	Retired	–	
Tyson Martin	North Queensland Cowboys	2011	
Liam McDonald	Burleigh Bears	2011	
Shane Muspratt	Retired	–	
Josh Rovelli	Released	–	
Todd Titmus	Released	–	

== Fixtures ==
=== Regular season ===
Date	Round	Opponent	Venue	Score	Tries	Goals
Saturday, 19 March	Round 1	Norths Devils	Bishop Park	16 – 6	Bobongie, Comerford	Taylor (4)
Sunday, 27 March	Round 2	Sunshine Coast Sea Eagles	Shark Park	36 – 12	Seymour (2), I. Ah Mau, Balcomb, Giumelli, Jones	Taylor (6)
Sunday, 3 April	Round 3	Tweed Heads Seagulls	Piggabeen Sports Complex	20 – 46	Hassall (2), Bobongie, Jones	Taylor (2)
Sunday, 10 April	Round 4	Ipswich Jets	North Ipswich Reserve	12 – 32	Balcomb, Giumelli	Taylor (2)
Sunday, 16 April	Round 5	Central Comets	Browne Park	32 – 24	Billings, Budworth, Dalton, Jones, Taylor	Taylor (6)
Sunday, 1 May	Round 6	Redcliffe Dolphins	Dolphin Oval	10 – 16	Comerford, Martin	Taylor (1)
Sunday, 8 May	Round 7	Wynnum Manly Seagulls	Shark Pack	12 – 14	Dalton, Gallant	Taylor (2)
Sunday, 15 May	Round 8	Northern Pride	Shark Park	22 – 18	Amos (2), Comerford, Dalton	Taylor (3)
Saturday, 21 May	Round 9	Easts Tigers	Langlands Park	6 – 18	Bobongie	Taylor (1)
Sunday, 29 May	Round 10	Souths Logan Magpies	Davies Park	10 – 26	Griffiths, Tupou	Jones (1)
Sunday, 5 June	Round 11	Burleigh Bears	Shark Park	6 – 7	Bobongie	Taylor (1)
Sunday, 12 June	Round 12	Norths Devils	Shark Park	26 – 6	Bobongie, Comerford, Giumelli, Griffiths, Young	Taylor (3)
Saturday, 18 June	Round 13	Sunshine Coast Sea Eagles	Sunshine Coast Stadium	24 – 22	Comerford (2), Balcomb, Taylor, Young	Taylor (2)
Sunday, 26 June	Round 14	Tweed Heads Seagulls	Shark Park	10 – 10	Amos, Comerford	Taylor (1)
Sunday, 10 July	Round 15	Ipswich Jets	Shark Park	10 – 56	Grintell, Young	Taylor (1)
Sunday, 17 July	Round 16	Central Comets	Shark Park	24 – 12	Faraimo (2), Giumelli, Rovelli	Taylor (4)
Sunday, 24 July	Round 17	Redcliffe Dolphins	Shark Park	17 – 16	Amos, Giumelli, Faraimo	Taylor (2), Rovelli (1 FG)
Saturday, 6 August	Round 18	Wynnum Manly Seagulls	BMD Kougari Oval	12 – 22	Faraimo, Smith	Comerford (2)
Saturday, 13 August	Round 19	Northern Pride	Barlow Park	10 – 30	Comerford, Jones	Grintell (1)
Saturday, 20 August	Round 20	Easts Tigers	Virgin Australia Stadium	14 – 16	Comerford, Faraimo, Grintell	Taylor (1)
Saturday, 27 August	Round 21	Souths Logan Magpies	Virgin Australia Stadium	20 – 34	L. Ah Mau, Amos, Faraimo, Young	Taylor (2)
Saturday, 3 September	Round 22	Burleigh Bears	Pizzey Park	20 – 30	Amos, Griffiths, Foster	Taylor (4)
Legend: Win Loss Draw Bye

== Statistics ==
*	Denotes player contracted to the North Queensland Cowboys for the 2011 season

Name	T	G	FG	Pts
Isaak Ah Mau	1	-	-	4
Leeson Ah Mau	1	-	-	4
Clint Amos	6	-	-	24
Lewis Balcomb	3	-	-	12
Janan Billings	1	-	-	4
Jardine Bobongie	5	-	-	20
Neil Budworth	1	-	-	4
Michael Comerford	9	2	-	40
Zac Dalton	3	-	-	12
Bureta Faraimo	6	-	-	24
Sam Foster	1	-	-	4
Shannon Gallant	1	-	-	4
Chris Giumelli	5	-	-	20
Darren Griffiths	3	-	-	12
Chad Grintell	2	1	-	10
Peter Hassall	2	-	-	8
Ben Jones	4	1	-	18
Tyson Martin	1	-	-	4
Grant Rovelli	1	-	1	5
Todd Seymour	2	-	-	8
Dylan Smith	1	-	-	4
Liam Taylor	2	48	-	104
Will Tupou	1	-	-	4
Luke Young	4	-	-	16
Totals	66	52	1	369

== Honours ==
=== Club ===
- Player of the Year: Lewis Balcomb
- Sponsor's Player of the Year: Jardine Bobongie
- Rookie of the Year: Bureta Faraimo
- Club Person of the Year: Tony Gambie
