= 2008 Mackay Cutters season =

- Queensland Cup rank: 9th
- Play-off result: Missed finals
- 2008 record: Wins: 7; draws: 1; losses: 12
- Points scored: For: 416; against: 488

Team information
- Coach: Shane Muspratt
- Captain: Shane Muspratt
- Stadium: Mackay Junior Rugby League Grounds

Top scorers
- Tries: Dean Tass (10)
- Goals: Daniel Abraham (33)
- Points: Daniel Abraham (86)
2009 →

The 2008 Mackay Cutters season was the first in the club's history. Captain-coached by Shane Muspratt, they competed in the QRL's Wizard Cup. The club finished ninth in their inaugural season, winning seven games, losing 12 and drawing once.

== Season summary ==
The Cutters played their first Queensland Cup game local rivals, the Northern Pride, who were also playing their first game, losing 16–44. Proserpine junior Sam Faust, who was contracted to the North Queensland Cowboys at the time, scored the club's first try. Two more losses followed before the club recorded their first win, a 24–22 victory over the Redcliffe Dolphins at Dolphin Oval. Their first home win came three weeks later when they defeated the Souths Logan Magpies 22–12 at the Mackay Junior Rugby League grounds. They won just four of their last 13 games and finished the season in ninth place.

=== Milestones ===
- Round 1: The club played their first Queensland Cup game.
- Round 1: Sam Faust scored the club's first try.
- Round 6: The club recorded their first Queensland Cup win.
- Round 8: The club recorded back-to-back wins for the first time.
- Round 21: Quinton Fielder became the first Cutters' player to score 3 tries in a game.
- Round 22: The club recorded their first three-game winning streak.

== Squad List ==
=== 2008 squad ===
Mackay Cutters
First team squad			Coaching staff
Aaron Barba – WG, FB; James Bryant – HK; Anthony Caulton – CE; Michael Comerford – WG; Brendan Crouch – PR; Quinton Fielder – PR; Daniel Flynn – FB, WG; Chris Giumelli – WG, FB; Daniel Goddard – HK; Sam Granville – CE	Regan Hyde – PR; Scott Leigh – SR; Royston Lightning – CE, LK; Matthew Mannion – CE; Jamie McDonald – PR; Shane Muspratt (c) – HB, HK; David Nixon – LK; Cody Norton – FE; Jared Owens – FE; Matt Parnis – CE	Michael Pearce – WG; Josh Rovelli – PR; Adam Schubert – LK; Todd Seymour – HB; Luke Srama – HK; Dean Tass – WG; Kerrod Toby – SR; Timote Williams – SR; Adam Wright – CE; Luke Young – FE, FB	Head coach: Shane Muspratt; Legend: (c) Captain(s); (vc) Vice-captain(s)

The following players contracted to the North Queensland Cowboys played for the Cutters in 2008: Daniel Abraham, Daniel Backo, Travis Burns, Ben Farrar, Sione Faumuina, Sam Faust, John Frith, George Gatis, Keiron Lander, Anthony Perkins, Matthew Scott, Shane Tronc, Anthony Watts and Dayne Weston.

== Squad movement ==
=== Gains ===
Player	Signed from	Until end of	Notes
John Doyle	Sydney Roosters	2008	
Matthew Mannion	Redcliffe Dolphins	2008	
Jamie McDonald	Toulouse Olympique	2008	
Shane Muspratt	North Queensland Cowboys	2008	
Cody Norton	Central Comets	2008	
Josh Rovelli	Wynnum Manly Seagulls	2008	
Adam Schubert	Sydney Roosters	2008	
Luke Young	Celtic Crusaders	2008	

The Cutters recruited a number of players from the local Mackay & District Rugby League competition, they included: Aaron Barba, Sam Granville, David Nixon, Matt Parnis (Mackay Brothers), Dean Tass (Northern Suburbs Devils), Daniel Flynn, Scott Leigh, Royston Lightning, Jared Owens (Sarina Crocs), Anthony Caulton, Michael Comerford, Michael Pearce, Todd Seymour, Luke Srama, Kerrod Toby (Souths Sharks), James Bryant and Chris Giumelli (Wests Tigers).

=== Losses ===
Player	
John Doyle	Retired (pre-season)

== Fixtures ==
=== Regular season ===
Date	Round	Opponent	Venue	Score	Tries	Goals
Saturday, 15 March	Round 1	Northern Pride	Barlow Park	16 – 44	Faust, Toby, Watts	Abraham (1), Giumelli (1)
Saturday, 22 March	Round 2	Wynnum Manly Seagulls	BMD Kougari Oval	10 – 18	Abraham, Barba	Abraham (1)
Saturday, 29 March	Round 3	Ipswich Jets	Mackay JRL Grounds	4 – 16	Giumelli	
	Round 4	Bye				
Saturday, 13 April	Round 5	Redcliffe Dolphins	Dolphin Oval	24 – 22	Burns (2), Abraham, Giumelli	Abraham (4)
Saturday, 19 April	Round 6	Norths Devils	Mackay JRL Grounds	14 – 22	Perkins (2), Farrar	Abraham (1)
Sunday, 26 April	Round 7	Burleigh Bears	Pizzey Park	32 – 10	Abraham, Burns, Fielder, Granville, Perkins	Abraham (6)
Saturday, 3 May	Round 8	Souths Logan Magpies	Mackay JRL Grounds	22 – 12	Barba (2), Tass, Flynn	Barba (2), Lightning (1)
Saturday, 10 May	Round 9	Easts Tigers	Mackay JRL Grounds	20 – 40	Backo, Barba, Perkins, Lightning	Barba (1), Seymour (1)
Saturday, 17 May	Round 10	Central Comets	Mackay JRL Grounds	12 – 18	Fielder, Seymour	Seymour (2)
Saturday, 24 May	Round 11	Tweed Heads Seagulls	Ned Byrne Field	26 – 26	Giumelli (2), Tass (2), Granville	Giumelli (3)
Saturday, 7 June	Round 12	Northern Pride	Mackay JRL Grounds	12 – 18	Gatis, Tass	Seymour (2)
Saturday, 14 June	Round 13	Wynnum Manly Seagulls	Mackay JRL Grounds	30 – 36	Frith, Gatis, Giumelli, Granville, Lander, Perkins	Giumelli (2), Seymour (1)
Saturday, 21 June	Round 14	Ipswich Jets	Briggs Rd Sporting Complex	6 – 48	Perkins	Abraham (1)
	Round 15	Bye				
Saturday, 5 July	Round 16	Redcliffe Dolphins	Mackay JRL Grounds	10 – 18	Flynn, Tass	Abraham (1)
Sunday, 13 July	Round 17	Norths Devils	Bishop Park	40 – 24	Lander (2), Giumelli, Lightning, McDonald, Toby, Wright	Abraham (6)
Saturday, 19 July	Round 18	Burleigh Bears	Mackay JRL Grounds	16 – 22	Giumelli (2), Gatis	Abraham (1), Flynn (1)
Sunday, 26 July	Round 19	Souths Logan Magpies	Meakin Park	22 – 26	Comerford, Granville, Toby, Wright	Abraham (3)
Saturday, 2 August	Round 20	Easts Tigers	Langlands Park	26 – 22	Fielder (2), Tass (2), Wright	Abraham (3)
Saturday, 9 August	Round 21	Central Comets	Browne Park	46 – 22	Fielder (3), Tass (2), Abraham, McDonald, Rovelli	Abraham (7)
Saturday, 16 August	Round 22	Tweed Heads Seagulls	Mackay JRL Grounds	28 – 24	Abraham, Flynn, Giumelli, Lightning, Seymour, Tass	Abraham (2)
Legend: Win Loss Draw Bye

== Statistics ==
*	Denotes player contracted to the North Queensland Cowboys for the 2008 season

Name	T	G	FG	Pts
Daniel Abraham	5	33	-	86
Daniel Backo	1	-	-	4
Aaron Barba	4	3	-	12
Travis Burns	3	-	-	12
Michael Comerford	1	-	-	4
Ben Farrar	1	-	-	4
Sam Faust	1	-	-	4
Quinton Fielder	7	-	-	28
Daniel Flynn	3	1	-	14
John Frith	1	-	-	4
George Gatis	3	-	-	12
Chris Giumelli	9	10	-	56
Sam Granville	4	-	-	16
Keiron Lander	3	-	-	12
Royston Lightning	3	1	-	14
Jamie McDonald	2	-	-	8
Anthony Perkins	6	-	-	24
Josh Rovelli	1	-	-	4
Todd Seymour	2	6	-	20
Dean Tass	10	-	-	40
Kerrod Toby	3	-	-	12
Anthony Watts	1	-	-	4
Adam Wright	3	-	-	12
Totals	77	54	0	416

== Honours ==
=== Club ===
- Player of the Year: Kerrod Toby
- Players' Player: Daniel Flynn
- Most Improved: Dean Tass
- Club Person of the Year: Kay Peel
