= Ah Mau =

Ah Mau is a surname. Notable people with the surname include:

- Isaak Ah Mau (born 1982), New Zealand rugby league player
- Leeson Ah Mau (born 1989), New Zealand rugby league player
