= Melanesian Cup =

Tournament information
- Sport: Rugby league
- Established: 2015
- Number of tournaments: 4
- Teams: Papua New Guinea, Fiji

Current champion
- Papua New Guinea

The Melanesian Cup is a rugby league football test match played between Fiji and Papua New Guinea first played in 2015. The matches in 2015, 2016 and 2018 were played as double-headers with the Polynesian Cup.

== Results ==
Date	Winner	Score	Loser	Venue	Ref.
2 May 2015	Fiji	22 – 10	Papua New Guinea	Cbus Super Stadium	
7 May 2016	Papua New Guinea	24 – 22	Fiji	Parramatta Stadium	
23 June 2018	Papua New Guinea	26 – 14	Fiji	Campbelltown Stadium	
25 June 2022	Papua New Guinea	24 – 14	Fiji	Campbelltown Stadium	

== See also ==
- Melanesia Cup – similar tournament in association football
- Polynesian Cup – equivalent tournament for Samoa and Tonga
