= Tyson Martin =

PNG international rugby league footballer

Personal information
- Full name: Tyson Martin
- Born: 23 October 1989 (age 35); Cairns, Queensland, Australila
- Height: 1.85 m (6 ft 1 in)
- Weight: 100 kg (15 st 10 lb)

Playing information
- Position: Second-row, Lock, Centre
Representative
Years	Team	Pld	T	G	FG	P
2009–15	Papua New Guinea	4	0	0	0	0
2009	PNG Prime Minister's XIII	1	0	0	0	0
- Source: As of 9 November 2023
- Relatives: Rhyse Martin (brother)

Tyson Martin (born 23 October 1989, in Cairns, Queensland) is a professional rugby league footballer for the North Queensland Cowboys of the National Rugby League competition. He is a Papua New Guinean international.

== Early career ==
Martin, born in Cairns, grew up in Proserpine and played his first junior rugby league for the Proserpine Brahmans. Martin then returned to Cairns to play for Cairns Brothers. While playing for Brothers, he was recruited to play in the inaugural Toyota Cup season for the North Queensland Cowboys. His younger brother, Rhyse, plays for Hull Kingston Rovers.

== North Queensland Cowboys ==
Martin played 18 games for the Cowboys Toyota Cup (Under-20s) teanin 2008, playing at a number of different positions during the year, including centre, five-eighth, halfback, second row and lock. In 2009, his final year of Toyota Cup eligibility, he played 22 games in the Under-20s, but still couldn't cement a starting spot in the team. Martin was not offered a contract by the Cowboys for 2010.

He was thrown a lifeline by the Mackay Cutters in the Queensland Cup and signed with them for the 2010 season. Martin was a stand out player for the Cutters in 2010 and 2011. His good form was rewarded with a first grade contract with the Cowboys for 2012.

Martin trained with the Cowboys first grade squad in 2012 and was named on an extended bench to face the Parramatta Eels in round 3, but was omitted before the game. While playing for the Cutters, Martin tore his anterior cruciate ligament and was ruled out for the rest of the 2012 season.

== Representative career ==
In 2009, Martin made his international debut off the bench for PNG Prime Minister's XIII against the Australian PM's XIII. He came up against Cowboys first graders Johnathan Thurston, Luke O'Donnell and Matthew Scott in the 42–18 loss.

Later in 2009, he played both games off the bench in Papua New Guinea's successful Pacific Cup campaign.

In 2015, Tyson played for Papua New Guinea in their inaugural Melanesian Cup test match against Fiji.

He is eligible for the Kumuls due to his Papua New Guinean father.
