= Ben Jones (Australian rugby league, born 1990) =

Australian rugby league footballer

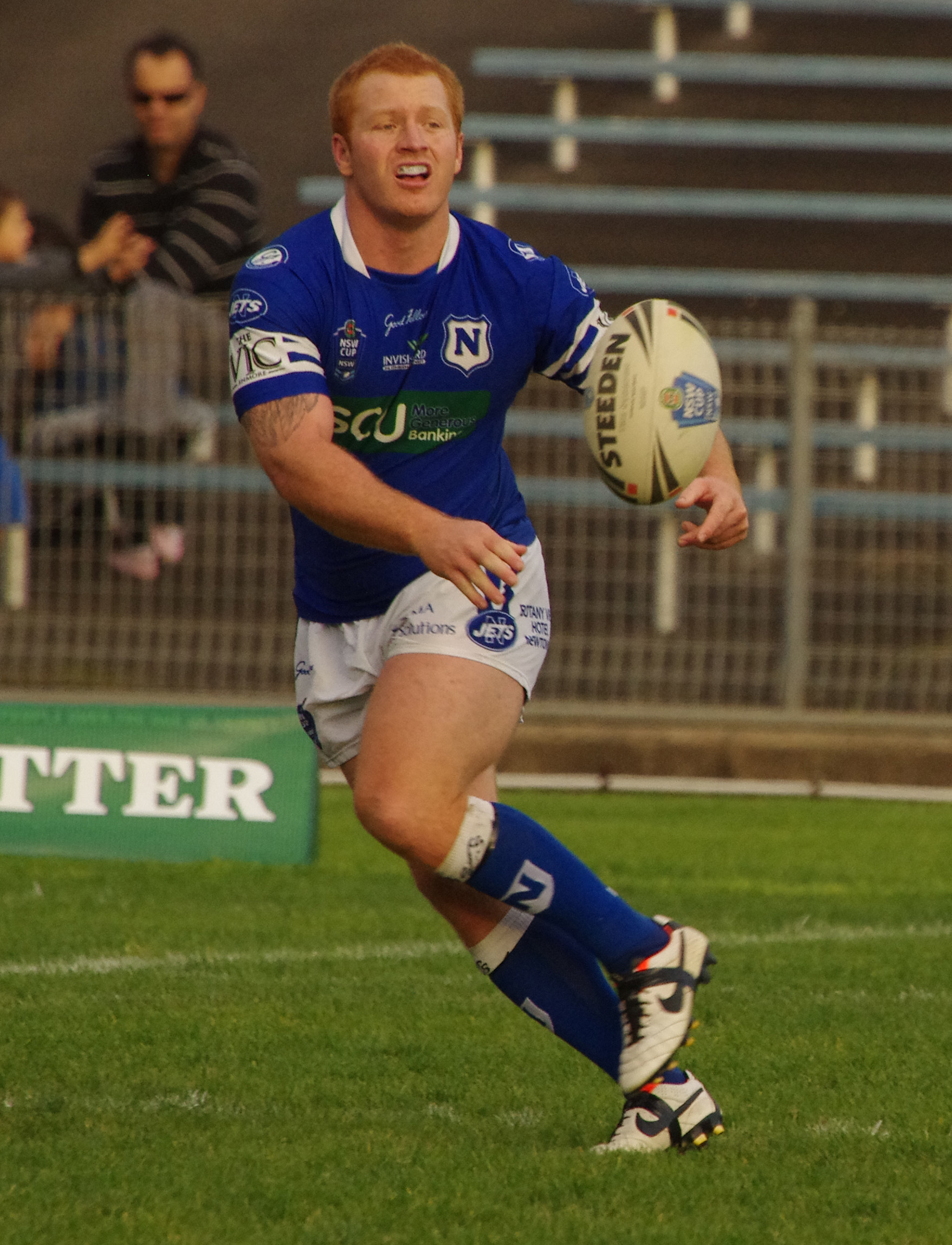

Personal information
- Full name: Ben Jones
- Born: 24 June 1990 (age 36) Orange, New South Wales, Australia
- Height: 178 cm (5 ft 10 in)
- Weight: 93 kg (14 st 9 lb)

Playing information
- Position: Hooker, Centre, Five-eighth, Halfback, Fullback
Club
Years	Team	Pld	T	G	FG	P
2008–10	Sydney Roosters	27	6	0	0	24
2011–12	North Qld Cowboys	8	3	0	0	12
	Total	35	9	0	0	36
Representative
Years	Team	Pld	T	G	FG	P
2009	Prime Minister's XIII	1	0	0	0	0
2010	Indigenous All Stars	1	1	0	0	4
- Source: As of 22 November 2026

Ben Jones (born 24 June 1990) is an Australian former professional rugby league footballer who played in the 2000s and 2010s. A utility player, he played as a five-eighth, centre or hooker.

== Background ==
Jones was born in Orange, New South Wales, Australia.

== Playing career ==
Jones started his first-grade career with the Sydney Roosters, his NRL debut coming in round 23 of the 2008 NRL season, against the Melbourne Storm.

In the 2009 NRL season, Jones played 21 games for the club as they finished last on the table for the first time since 1966.

In 2010, Jones was called into the Indigenous All Stars representative side for the annual match against the NRL All Stars after first-choice hooker PJ Marsh withdrew because of injury. The Roosters qualified the NRL Grand Final in the 2010 season, although Jones was not a member of the Roosters' squad for the match, which lost to the St George Illawarra Dragons.

After 27 NRL matches for the Roosters, Jones joined the North Queensland Cowboys for the 2011 season. The Roosters had been unable to keep him under the NRL's salary cap. During the 2011 NRL season, he was selected to fill in for the Cowboys' captain Johnathan Thurston in the key halfback position.

Jones returned to the Sydney Roosters in 2013 via their reserve grade team Newtown.

In November 2013, it was announced that he would join the Parramatta Eels on a train and trial basis for the 2014 preseason.
