= John Frith (rugby league) =

Australian rugby league footballer

Personal information
- Born: 24 April 1985 (age 41) Roma, Queensland, Australia
- Height: 190 cm (6 ft 3 in)
- Weight: 107 kg (16 st 12 lb)

Playing information
- Position: Prop
Club
Years	Team	Pld	T	G	FG	P
2007	North Qld Cowboys	1	0	0	0	0
- Source: As of 23 August 2008

John Frith (born 24 April 1985 in Roma, Queensland) is an Australian former professional rugby league footballer for the North Queensland Cowboys in the National Rugby League (NRL) competition.

On 25 May 2007, Frith made his only first-grade appearance for the Cowboys from the bench in a 26–16 win over the Canterbury-Bankstown Bulldogs.
