= Polynesian Cup =

Rugby league football test match played between Samoa and Tonga

- Contested by
Samoa	Tonga
Sport	Rugby league
First held	2010
Current champion	Tonga
- Number of wins
Samoa	Tonga
3	2
- Draws: None

The Polynesian Cup is a rugby league football test match played between Samoa and Tonga first played in 2010. The matches in 2015, 2016 and 2018 were played as double-headers with the Melanesian Cup.

== Results ==
Date	Winner	Score	Loser	Venue	Ref.
24 October 2010	Samoa	22 – 6	Tonga	Parramatta Stadium	
20 April 2013	Tonga	36 – 4	Samoa	Penrith Football Stadium	
2 May 2015	Samoa	18 – 16	Tonga	Cbus Super Stadium	
7 May 2016	Samoa	18 – 6	Tonga	Parramatta Stadium	
23 June 2018	Tonga	38 – 22	Samoa	Campbelltown Stadium	

== See also ==
- Polynesia Cup – similar tournament in association football
- Melanesian Cup – equivalent tournament for Fiji and Papua New Guinea
