= George Gatis =

Greece international rugby league footballer

Personal information
- Born: 25 March 1978 (age 48) Townsville, Queensland, Australia

Playing information
- Height: 174 cm (5 ft 9 in)
- Weight: 89 kg (14 st 0 lb)
- Position: Hooker
Club
Years	Team	Pld	T	G	FG	P
2001–03	North Qld Cowboys	24	4	0	0	16
2006–07	New Zealand Warriors	39	6	0	0	234
2008	Huddersfield Giants	10	1	0	0	4
2008	North Qld Cowboys	1	0	0	0	0
	Total	74	11	0	0	254

George Gatis (born 25 March 1978) is a former rugby league footballer who played as a hooker in the 2000s in the NRL and the Super League.

He played for the New Zealand Warriors, and the North Queensland Cowboys in two separate spells in the National Rugby League, and the Huddersfield Giants in the European Super League.

== Background ==
He was born in Townsville, Queensland, Australia and is of Greek heritage.

== Playing career ==
In his junior years playing Rugby League Gatis would play for Souths Townsville and Centrals in the TDJRL.

Gatis originally played for the Wests Panthers and the Easts Tigers in the Queensland Cup.

=== North Queensland ===
He made his first grade début for the North Queensland Cowboys in 2001. Gatis played 24 games for the Cowboys between 2001 and 2003.

A broken arm in 2003 followed by a knee reconstruction kept Gatis out of first-grade for several years.

=== New Zealand Warriors ===
When the New Zealand Warriors visited Townsville in 2005, assistant coach Kevin Campion offered Gatis a chance to come and spend the pre-season with the Warriors.

Gatis accepted the offer and, in 2006, he was signed by the New Zealand Warriors. He played in thirty nine games for the club over two seasons.

=== Huddersfield ===
In August 2007 Gatis signed for the Huddersfield Giants for the 2008 and 2009 seasons. However, just three months into a two-year contract with Huddersfield, George quit the club for personal reasons.

=== Retirement ===
Gatis returned to Australia and helped his parents fish and chip shop. During the 2008 season he signed with the North Queensland Cowboys, and played one NRL match for the club, starting at hooker. For the majority of the season he played with the Northern Pride in the Queensland Cup. He retired at the end of the season.

== Post-retirement ==
Following retirement, Gatis continued to work in his family's business. He later became a prison officer with Queensland Corrective Services.

== International career ==
Gatis, of Greek heritage, played for the Greece national team several times in non-test fixtures. He received Greek citizenship in November 2007.
