= Leeson Ah Mau =

New Zealand rugby league footballer

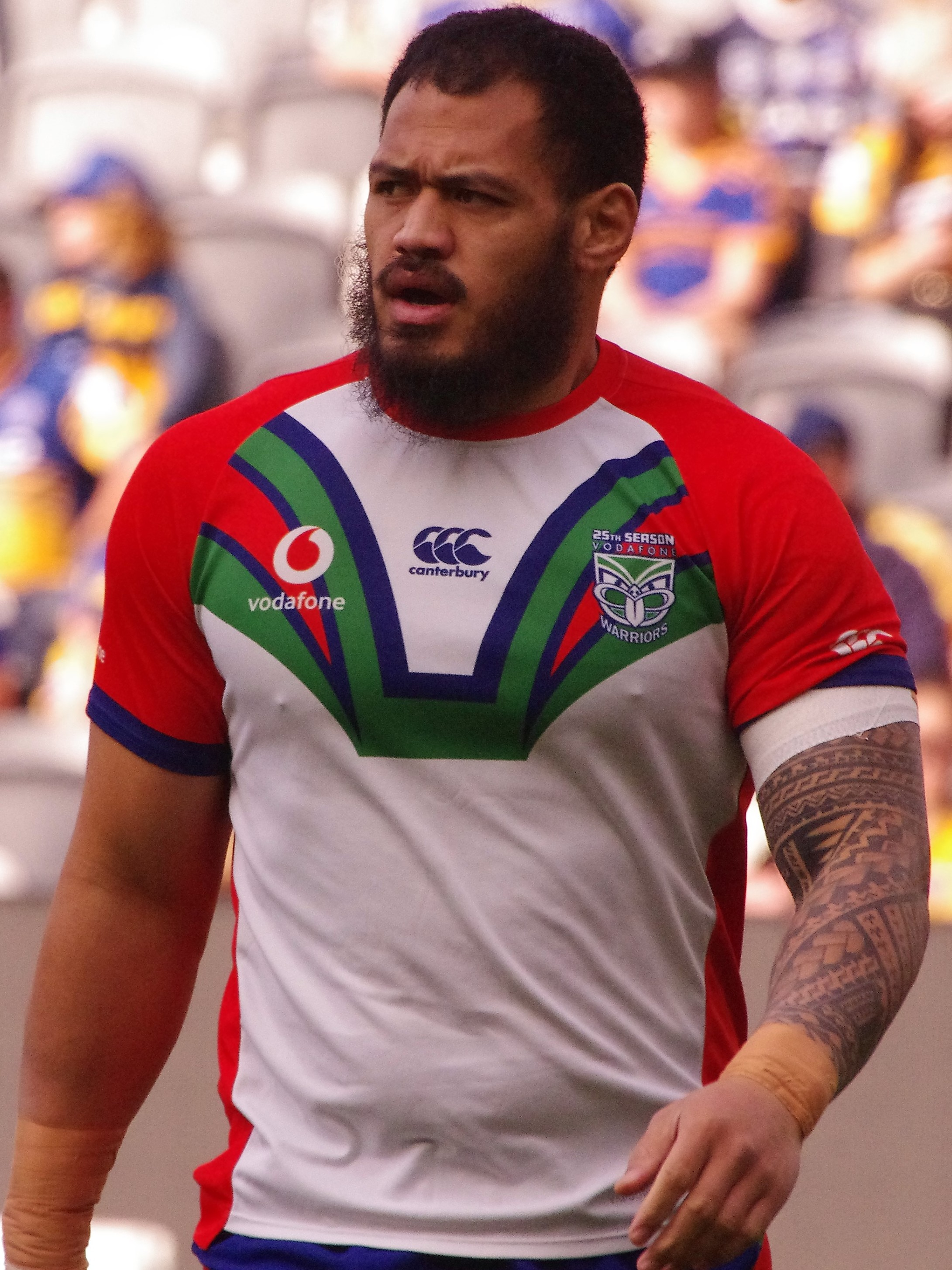

Personal information
- Born: 20 December 1989 (age 36) Auckland, New Zealand
- Height: 185 cm (6 ft 1 in)
- Weight: 111 kg (17 st 7 lb)

Playing information
- Position: Prop
Club
Years	Team	Pld	T	G	FG	P
2009	New Zealand Warriors	2	0	0	0	0
2010–11	North Qld Cowboys	33	2	0	0	8
2012–18	St. George Illawarra	145	4	1	0	18
2019–21	New Zealand Warriors	41	1	0	0	4
	Total	221	7	1	0	30
Representative
Years	Team	Pld	T	G	FG	P
2013–17	Samoa	16	0	0	0	0
2018–19	New Zealand	9	0	0	0	0
- Source: As of 3 June 2021
- Relatives: Isaak Ah Mau (brother)

Leeson Ah Mau (born 20 December 1989) is a former professional rugby league footballer, who has represented both Samoa and New Zealand at international level.

He previously played for the Warriors, North Queensland Cowboys and the St George Illawarra Dragons in the National Rugby League.

== Early years ==
Ah Mau was born in Auckland, New Zealand, and is of Samoan and Chinese descent. He is the brother of Isaak Ah Mau.

He attended De La Salle College, Mangere East, and started his rugby league career with the Papatoetoe Panthers, later moving to Otahuhu, and playing in Auckland Rugby League competitions. As a member of Otahuhu, Ah Mau played for the Tamaki Titans in the Bartercard Cup. Ah Mau played for the Junior Kiwis in 2006 and the New Zealand under-18 side in 2007. Ah Mau was signed to a developmental contract with the Warriors in 2007. During his first year with the club he played 18 games in the NSWRL Premier League for the Auckland Lions. In 2008 he played for the Junior Warriors in the inaugural season of the Toyota Cup. He finished his Toyota Cup career with 40 appearances.

== Playing career ==
=== 2009 ===
In round 1 of the 2009 NRL season, Ah Mau made his first grade debut for the New Zealand Warriors against the Parramatta Eels off the interchange bench in the Warriors 26–18 win. However, after suffering a hamstring injury, Ah Mau did not play first grade again in 2009. His contract was not renewed for the 2010 season, and he signed with the North Queensland Cowboys. Ah Mau finished his debut year in the NRL with him playing in 2 matches for the New Zealand Warriors.

=== 2010 ===
Ah Mau made his first grade debut for the North Queensland Cowboys in round 4, against the Gold Coast Titans playing off the interchange bench in the Cowboys 32–18 win at 1300SMILES Stadium. Ah Mau scored his first NRL career try in the round 22 Queensland derby match against the Brisbane Broncos in the Cowboys 26–34 loss at 1300SMILES Stadium. Ah Mau went on to be named the Cowboys' rookie of the year for the 2010 season, having made 18 first-grade appearances and scoring a try.

=== 2011 ===
On 8 August 2011 Ah Mau signed with the St George Illawarra Dragons on a 2-year deal starting from 2012. Ah Mau finished the Cowboys 2011 NRL season with him playing in 15 matches and scoring a try.

=== 2012 ===
In round 1 of the 2012 NRL season, in the season opener against the Newcastle Knights at Hunter Stadium, Ah Mau made his club debut for the St George Illawarra Dragons off the interchange bench in the Dragons golden point extra time 15–14 win. Ah Mau spent most of the year playing for the Illawarra Cutters in the NSW Cup. Ah Mau finished the Dragons 2012 NRL season with him playing in 11 matches.

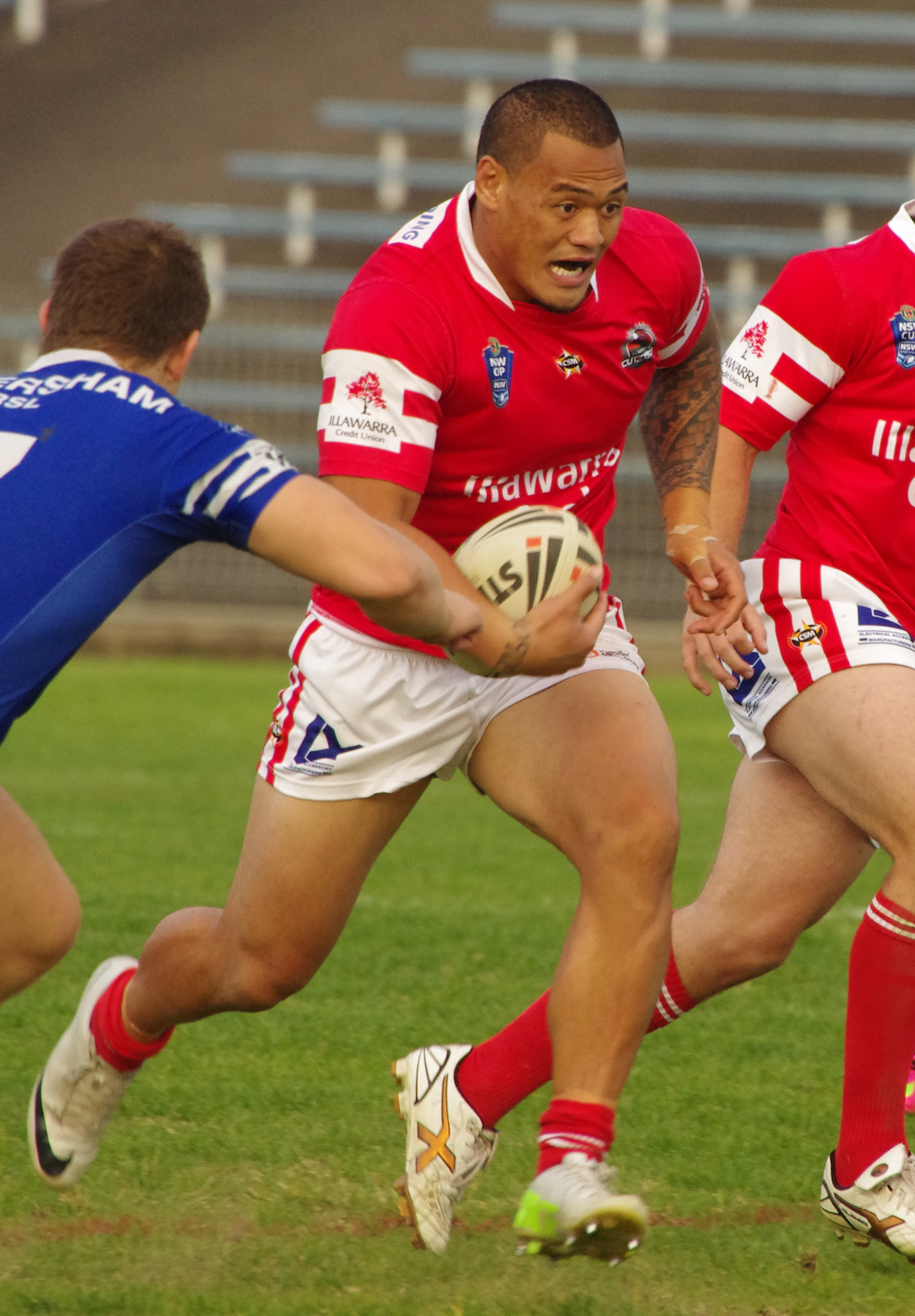
Ah Mau playing for St. George Illawarra

=== 2013 ===
On 20 April 2013, Ah Mau made his international début, playing for Samoa in the Pacific Rugby League International against pacific rivals Tonga. Ah Mau played off the interchange bench in Samoa's 4–36 loss at Penrith Stadium. In round 24, against the Wests Tigers at the SCG, Ah Mau scored his first club try for the Dragons in the Dragons 16–34 loss. Ah Mau finished the Dragons 2013 NRL season with him playing in 15 matches and scoring a try. On 24 September 2013, Ah Mau extended his contracted with the Dragons for a further two years, until the end of the 2015 season.

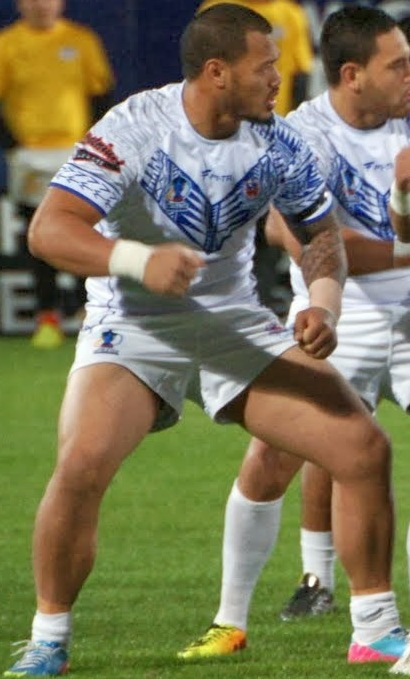
Ah Mau representing Samoa

In October 2013, Ah Mau was selected for Samoa to participate in their 2013 World Cup campaign. Ah Mau played in three of Samoa's four matches.

=== 2014 ===
On 14 February 2014, Ah Mau was selected in the Dragons inaugural 2014 Auckland Nines squad. On 3 May 2014, Ah Mau played for Samoa in the 2014 Pacific Rugby League International against Fiji at Penrith Stadium. Ah Mau played at second-row in Samoa's 32–16 win. Ah Mau finished off the Dragons 2014 NRL season with him playing in 23 matches and scoring a try. On 7 October 2014, Ah Mau was selected in Samoa's 24 man squad for the 2014 Four Nations series.

=== 2015 ===
On 2 May, Ah Mau played for Samoa in their Polynesian Cup clash with Pacific rivals Tonga, playing at second-row in Samoa's 18–16 win at Cbus Super Stadium. On 22 May 2015, Ah Mau re-signed with the Dragons on a 3-year contract, until the end of the 2018 season. He played in every game for the Dragons in the 2015 season, and earned the 2015 Dragons' Player of the Year medal at the Annual Red V Awards Ceremony.

=== 2016 ===
On 7 May 2016, Ah Mau played for Samoa in the 2016 Polynesian Cup against Tonga, where he started at second-row in the 18–6 win at Parramatta Stadium. Later in the year he captained Samoa in their historic test match against Fiji in Apia.

=== 2017 ===
On 6 October 2017, Ah Mau was selected for Samoa to participate in their 2017 World Cup campaign, and played in all four of their matches.

=== 2018 ===
On 9 July 2018, it was announced that Ah Mau had signed with the New Zealand Warriors for three years starting in 2019.

=== 2019 ===
In round 22, Ah Mau played his 200th NRL game for the Warriors in their 42–6 loss against the Sydney Roosters at the Sydney Cricket Ground in Sydney.

=== 2021 ===
At the conclusion of the 2021 season, Leeson announced his retirement from the game after playing 221 NRL first grade matches.

== Statistics ==
Year	Team	Games	Tries	Goals	Pts
2009	Warriors	2			
2010	North Queensland Cowboys	18	1		4
2011	North Queensland Cowboys	15	1		4
2012	St. George Illawarra Dragons	11			
2013	St. George Illawarra Dragons	15	1		4
2014	St. George Illawarra Dragons	23	1		4
2015	St. George Illawarra Dragons	25			
2016	St. George Illawarra Dragons	21			
2017	St. George Illawarra Dragons	24		1	2
2018	St. George Illawarra Dragons	25	2		8
2019	Warriors	24			
2020	Warriors	2			
2021	Warriors	18	1		4
	Totals	221	7	1	30
