= Royston Lightning =

Australian rugby league footballer

Personal information
- Full name: Royston Lightning
- Born: 18 May 1978 (age 46)

Playing information
- Position: Wing
Club
| Years | Team | Pld | T | G | FG | P |
|---|---|---|---|---|---|---|
| 1996–98 | Canberra Raiders | 15 | 5 | 11 | 0 | 42 |

Royston Lightning (18 May 1978 (age 46)) is an Australian former professional rugby league footballer who played for Herbert River Junior Rugby League, and from 1996 to 1998 for the Canberra Raiders, as a wing. He later played for the Mackay Cutters in the Queensland Cup. He has previously played for both Southern Suburbs (Cairns) and Queanbeyan Kangaroos in the Canberra Rugby League competition.
