= Donald Malone =

Australian rugby league footballer

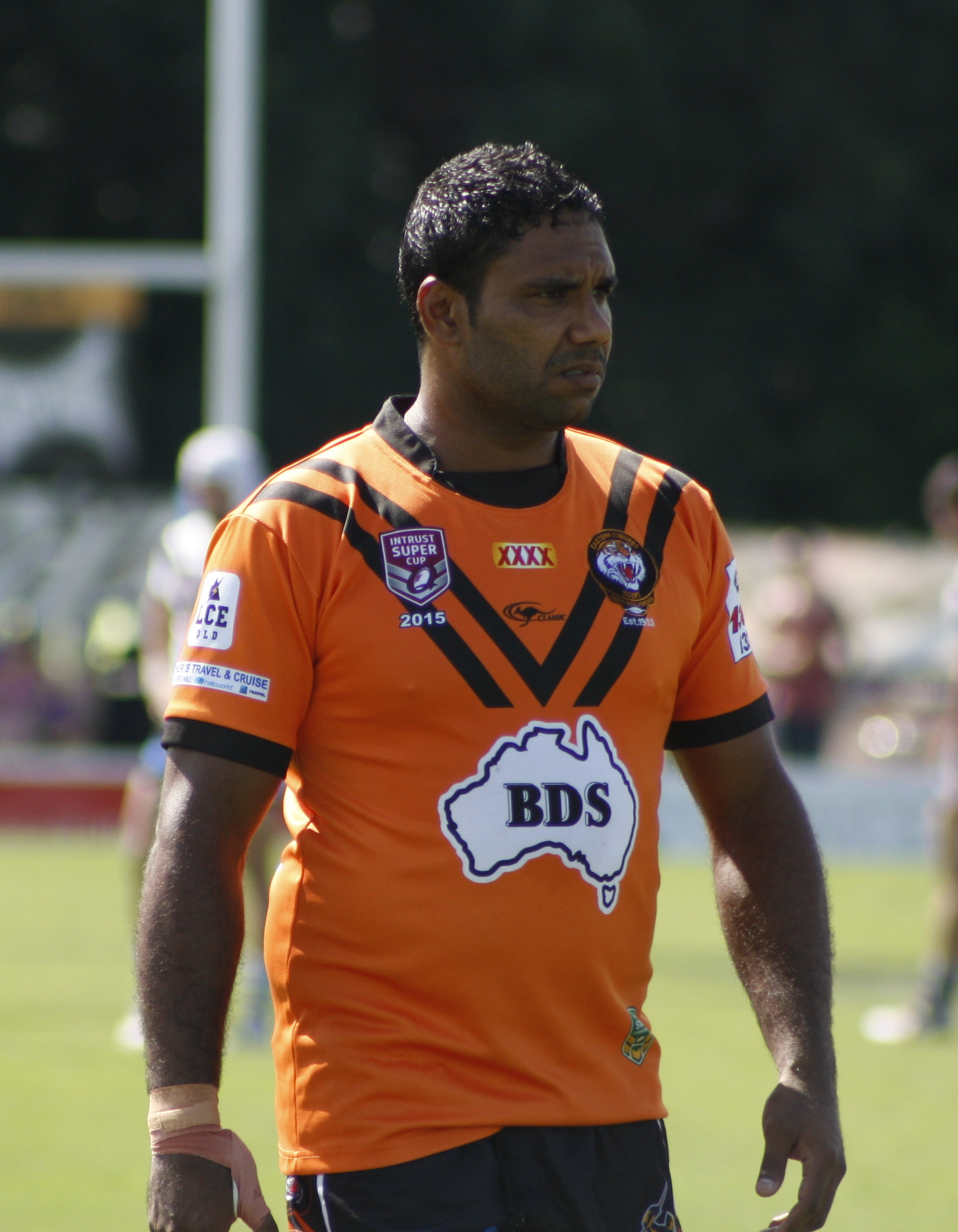

Personal information
- Born: 29 July 1985 (age 39)
- Height: 182 cm (6 ft 0 in)
- Weight: 97 kg (15 st 4 lb)

Playing information
- Position: Wing
Club
Years	Team	Pld	T	G	FG	P
2009	North Queensland Cowboys	2	1	0	0	4
Representative
Years	Team	Pld	T	G	FG	P
2010–13	Queensland Residents	3	2	1	0	10
- Source: As of 5 January 2024
- Relatives: Steve Renouf (uncle)

Donald Malone (born 29 July 1985) is an Australian former professional rugby league footballer who last played for the Sunshine Coast Falcons in the Queensland Cup. He previously played for the North Queensland Cowboys in the NRL.

== Background ==
He is the nephew of former Brisbane Broncos, Queensland and Australian centre Steve Renouf.

== Playing career ==
Malone made his first grade debut for North Queensland in round 22 of the 2009 NRL season against Melbourne. He scored his first NRL try in round 26 against the Sydney Roosters.He scored 34 tries for the Ipswich Jets in the Queensland Cup. In 2012, he was named in the Queensland Residents side and the Queensland Murris to face the USA Tomahawks at Honolulu in which the Murris won 72–10. In 2015, Malone played for Easts in the Queensland Cup. In 2017, he played for the Sunshine Coast.
