= Neil Budworth =

Wales international rugby league footballer

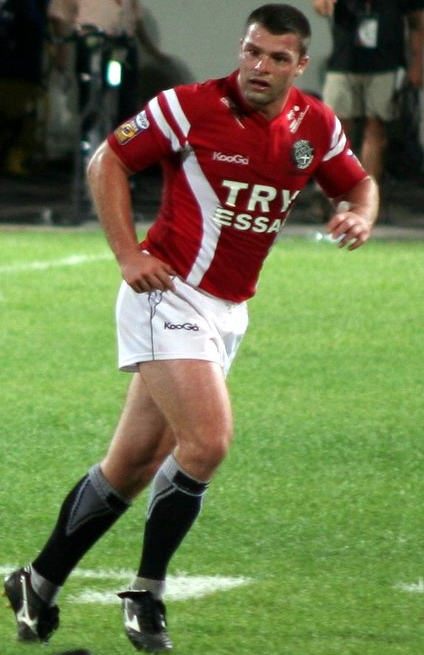

Personal information
- Born: 10 March 1982 (age 43); Higher End, Wigan, England
- Height: 175 cm (5 ft 9 in)
- Weight: 92 kg (14 st 7 lb)

Playing information
- Position: Hooker
Club
Years	Team	Pld	T	G	FG	P
2002–06	London Broncos/Harlequins RL	98	4	1	0	18
2007–09	Crusaders RL	83	11	0	0	44
	Total	181	15	1	0	62
Representative
Years	Team	Pld	T	G	FG	P
2009–13	Wales	13	0	0	0	0
- Source: As of 30 September 2013

Neil Budworth (born 10 March 1982) is a former Wales international rugby league footballer who finished his career playing for the Mackay Cutters.

== Background ==
Budworth was born in Higher End, Wigan, Greater Manchester, England.

== Career ==
He previously played for the London Broncos/Harlequins RL in the Super League competition and was one of their longest serving players. He also played for the Crusaders RL in National League One and the Super League as a hooker.
