= Justin Hunt (rugby league) =

Australian rugby league footballer

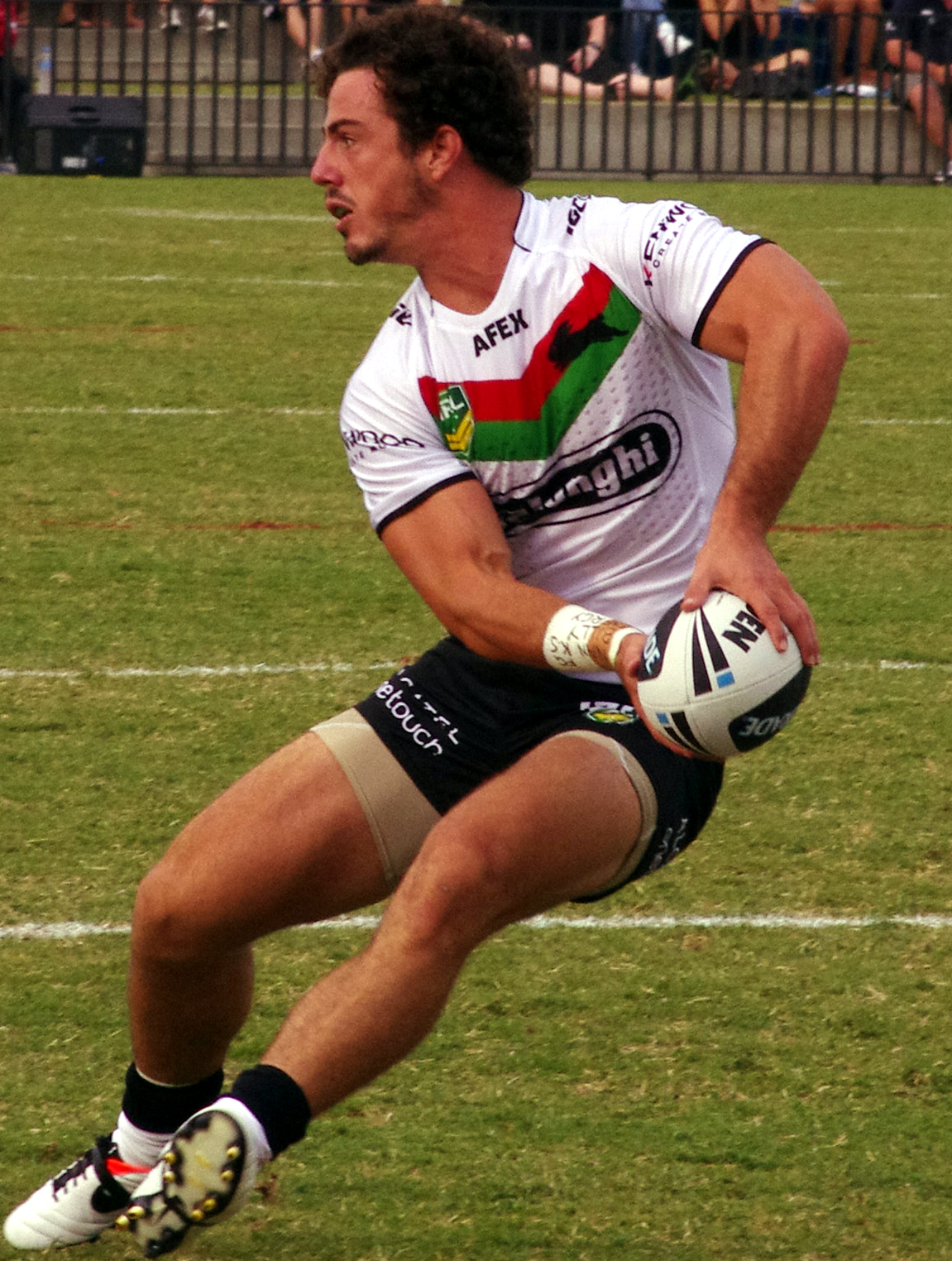

Personal information
- Born: 20 September 1988 (age 38) Tweed Heads, New South Wales, Australia

Playing information
- Height: 182 cm (6 ft 0 in)
- Weight: 90 kg (14 st 2 lb)
- Position: Fullback, Wing
Club
Years	Team	Pld	T	G	FG	P
2012–13	South Sydney	13	7	0	0	28
2014	Parramatta Eels	1	0	0	0	0
2015	St. George Illawarra	7	3	0	0	12
2016	Wests Tigers	1	0	0	0	0
	Total	22	10	0	0	40
Representative
Years	Team	Pld	T	G	FG	P
2016	NSW Residents	1	0	0	0	0
- Father: Neil Hunt

Justin Hunt (born 20 September 1988) is an Australian former professional rugby league footballer who last played for the Wests Tigers in the National Rugby League. The son of former Parramatta premiership winger Neil Hunt and grandson of former South Sydney player Jim Hunt, Hunt previously played for South Sydney, Parramatta and St. George Illawarra. He primarily played as a fullback and wing.

== Early career ==
Born in Tweed Heads, Hunt grew up across the border on the Gold Coast, Queensland and played his first junior football for the Tugun Seahawks, where he represented the Queensland Country side. Hunt then moved to Sydney in 2008 to play in the inaugural season of the National Youth Competition with the Parramatta Eels. He played 3 games for the club before transferring mid season to the Wests Tigers, playing 4 games for them. From there, Hunt left the Tigers and played for a number of clubs in the following years.

In 2009, he spent the season with the North Sydney Bears in the NSW Cup where his nickname was swiney before moving back to Queensland in 2010, to play for the North Queensland Cowboys feeder club, the Mackay Cutters in the Queensland Cup. He trained in the off-season with the Cowboys but was unable to get a start in the first grade side. In 2011, he signed for the Brisbane Broncos feeder side the Redcliffe Dolphins. Once again he trained with the first grade side but was unable to make his NRL debut. After a great season for the Dolphins, he and team mate Ryan Carr, signed one year contracts with the South Sydney Rabbitohs for the 2012 season.

== NRL career ==
Hunt started the 2012 season playing for South Sydney's feeder team, the North Sydney Bears. After 2 months of great form with Norths, Hunt made his first grade debut for South Sydney on the wing, in their round 11 victory against the St. George Illawarra Dragons. He scored his first try a week later against the Canberra Raiders.

In June 2012, he extended his contract at South Sydney for a further two seasons. He played in 10 games in 2012, scoring 5 tries.

In August 2013 Hunt announced that he had signed with the Parramatta Eels. With South Sydney having a number of preferred first graders, Hunt decided it was time to return to the club where his father had starred in the 1980s. Hunt spent most of his playing time outside the NRL level with North Sydney. In total, Hunt made 51 appearances for Norths, scoring 38 tries and kicking 115 goals from 165 attempts finishing with a total of 388 points.

Hunt made his debut for Parramatta in round 12 2014 against Penrith which ended in a 38-12 loss at Penrith Park. This would turn out to be the only appearance Hunt made for the Parramatta first grade side.

In February 2015, Hunt gained a release from Parramatta to join the St George Illawarra Dragons on a one-year deal.

In September 2016, Hunt was named on the interchange bench in the 2016 Intrust Super Premiership NSW Team of the Year. On 12 September 2017, Hunt announced his retirement from rugby league effective immediately due to injury at just the age of 29.
