= Ben Farrar =

Australian rugby league player (born 1986)

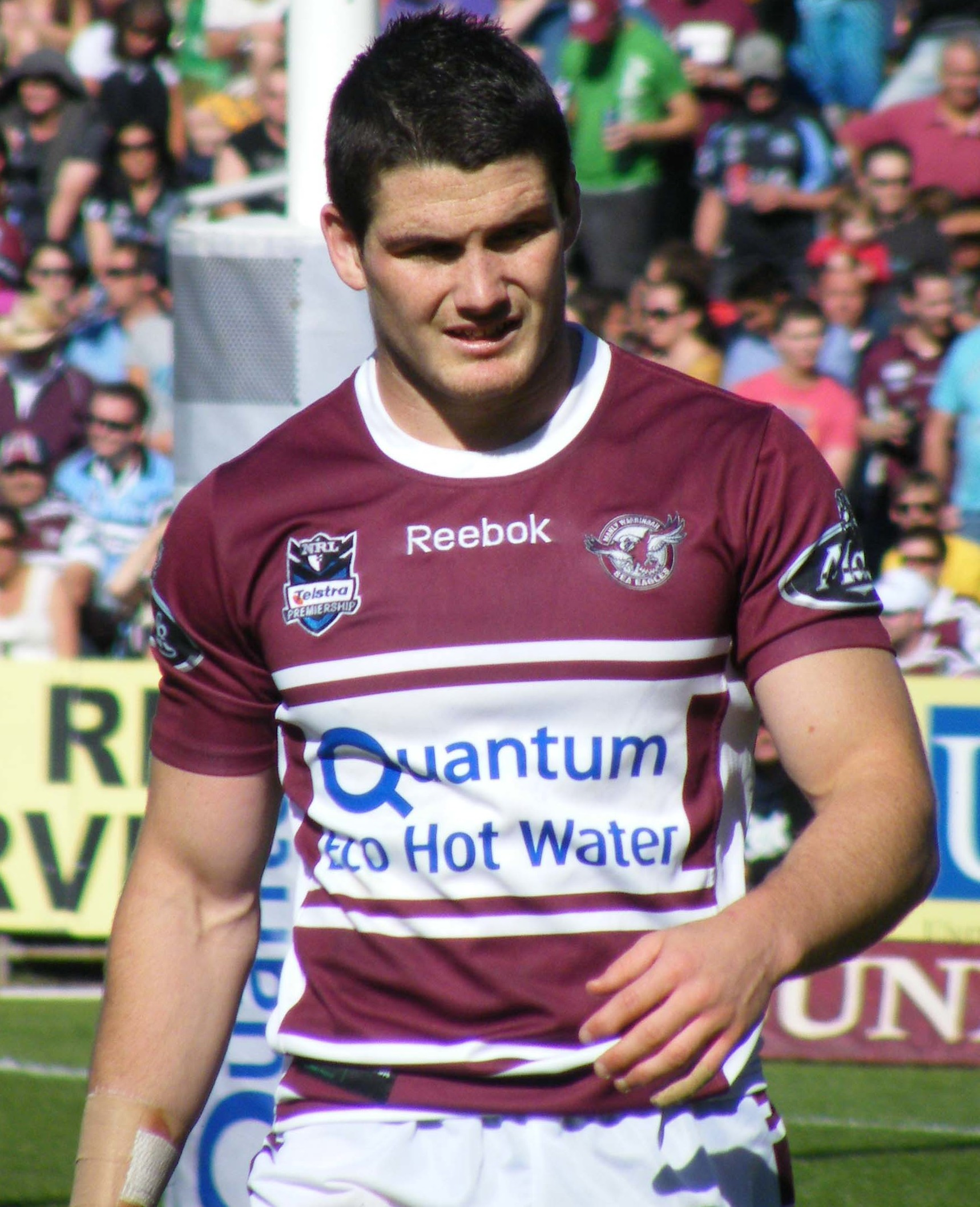

Personal information
- Full name: Ben Farrar
- Born: 2 December 1986 (age 39) Newcastle, New South Wales, Australia
- Height: 179 cm (5 ft 10 in)
- Weight: 88 kg (13 st 12 lb)

Playing information
- Position: Fullback, Centre, Wing, Five-eighth
Club
Years	Team	Pld	T	G	FG	P
2007–09	North Qld Cowboys	38	15	0	0	60
2009–10	Manly Sea Eagles	35	15	0	0	60
2011	Catalans Dragons	14	3	0	0	12
2014–15	London Broncos	36	1	0	0	4
2022–	New York RL	0	0	0	0	0
	Total	123	34	0	0	136

Coaching information
Club
Years	Team	Gms	W	D	L	W%
2022–	New York RL	0	0	0	0
- Source: As of 21 November 2026
- Relatives: Andrew Farrar (uncle)

Ben Farrar (born 2 December 1986) is an Australian former professional rugby league footballer. He is the player/head coach of New York RL. He previously played for the North Queensland Cowboys and Manly-Warringah Sea Eagles in the National Rugby League and the Catalans Dragons in the Super League. He primarily played fullback, centre, wing but had filled in at five-eighth in the past.

== Playing career ==
Born in Newcastle, New South Wales, Farrar played his junior football for the Western Suburbs Rosellas before being signed by the Newcastle Knights. He played for the Knights' S.G. Ball team in 2004, winning the 2004 S.G. Ball Cup Grand Final.

=== Parramatta Eels ===
In 2005, Farrar joined the Parramatta Eels, winning the Premier League Grand Final in 2006.

=== North Queensland Cowboys ===
In 2007, Farrar joined the North Queensland Cowboys. He played for the North Queensland Young Guns in the Queensland Cup.

In round 7 of the 2007 NRL season, Farrar made his NRL début for the Cowboys against the Manly-Warringah Sea Eagles. He scored a try on debut.

=== Manly Warringah Sea Eagles ===
In 2009, after playing 38 games for the club, Farrar made a mid-season move to the Manly-Warringah Sea Eagles in a player swap for Michael Bani.

In 2010, Farrar was thrust into the fullback position for the Manly club after playing most of his career as a centre or wing following a season ending knee injury to teammate Brett Stewart. Despite not having played at the back since his junior days, Farrar generally impressed with his displays at fullback for Manly.

=== Catalans Dragons ===
On 14 September 2010, Farrar signed a one-year contract with the Catalans Dragons in the Super League starting in 2011, alongside childhood teammate, Scott Dureau.

In 2011, Farrar signed a two-year contract to return to the Manly-Warringah Sea Eagles in 2012. However, he was injury-plagued during both seasons and did not play a first-grade game.

=== London Broncos ===
In February 2014 Farrar signed a two-year contract to play with the London Broncos in the Super League competition.

=== New York Rugby League ===
After a period coaching the juniors and women's teams at Newcastle Knights it was announced in July 2022 that Farrar signed a contract to both play and coach New York Rugby League in the NARL competition.

== Representative career ==
Farrar had played for the New South Wales U19's team.

== Personal life ==
Farrar is the nephew of former Canterbury-Bankstown Bulldogs, Western Suburbs Magpies, Wigan Warriors and Illawarra Steelers player Andrew Farrar.
