= Anthony Watts (rugby league) =

Australian rugby league footballer, and boxer

Personal information
- Born: 12 September 1986 (age 40) Gold Coast, Queensland, Australia

Playing information
- Height: 180 cm (5 ft 11 in)
- Weight: 87 kg (13 st 10 lb)
- Position: Hooker, Halfback
Club
Years	Team	Pld	T	G	FG	P
2007	Cronulla Sharks	5	0	0	0	0
2008–10	North Qld Cowboys	47	8	0	0	32
2012	Widnes Vikings	1	0	0	0	0
	Total	53	8	0	0	32
Representative
Years	Team	Pld	T	G	FG	P
2010	Prime Minister's XIII	1	0	0	0	0

Anthony Watts (born 12 September 1986), is an Australian, and a former professional rugby league footballer who played as a hooker in the 2000s and 2010s.

He played for the North Queensland Cowboys and the Cronulla-Sutherland Sharks in the NRL and the Widnes Vikings in the Super League.

== Background ==
Watts was born in Gold Coast, Queensland, Australia.

== Playing career ==
Watts made his NRL debut for the Cronulla-Sutherland Sharks in 2007. He played in five games in the back half of the season, playing halfback or from the bench. Watts was sacked by Cronulla-Sutherland at the end of the 2007 NRL season after he was involved in an alcohol-related Mad Monday incident in which he got in a fight at Sharks House, where the club accommodated young recruits.

In 2008, Watts joined the North Queensland Cowboys. He scored a try in his first two games with, but his next ten games played were all losses. In 2009, Watts was still playing mostly from the bench, but towards the end of the year he made his first appearances as starting hooker. In July 2009, Watts was suspended for one match after a scrum fight with Wests Tigers player Robbie Farah. Earlier in the match, Watts had struck out at Farah. Later on in the game, Farah and Watts engaged in a second fist fight where Watts was knocked to the ground.

2010 was Watts most successful year. He played in 21 games and scored 4 tries. Watts joined the Sydney Roosters in 2011 on a three-year deal.

Watts fell into disrepute when he was allegedly involved in an altercation with his girlfriend which resulted in him being charged with assault occasioning actual bodily harm. At the time of the incident, Watts was in the company of fellow Roosters player, Todd Carney. Roosters CEO Steve Noyce said, "Anthony Watts has been suspended effective immediately and will be issued with a breach notice. The club has worked closely with Anthony in the past to address a number of issues, including anti-social behaviour, and this decision stands regardless of what the court decides." Watts never played first grade with the Sydney Roosters and was later released by the club.

He signed with the Widnes Vikings for the 2012 season where he hoped to revive his career. Watts settled well into the new look Vikings team and played in several pre-season friendlies, winning plaudits from many of the Vikings fans for his ability and exciting attacking play, but on 19 February 2012 suffered a torn right anterior cruciate ligament just 10 minutes into his Super League début during the defeat by Salford City Reds, leading to an anticipated minimum six month lay off. Despite this, he signed an extension to his contract on 1 May 2012 which was designed to keep him at the club until the end of 2013. Barely a week later he was released by the Vikings, with immediate effect in order to return home for personal reasons. It was alleged that Watts was involved in an alcohol-fuelled brawl in Widnes and was arrested for being drunk and disorderley. The police also alleged that Watts was found to be in possession of cocaine. Watts was cautioned by police and released.

== Post-NRL ==
Upon the death of his father, Watts abandoned his plans for a NRL return and signed with the Tugun Seahawks of the Gold Coast Rugby League. Watts was playing for Tugun in 2013, when he was accused of biting an opposition player on the penis during a melee in a match. Watts was given an eight-week suspension, but denied the charge. "I was wearing a mouthguard and there’s no way I bit him on the dick. It’s pretty shithouse to be at the centre of something like this, even though I've been through a lot in my career," he said.

== Boxing ==
Watts won his first professional fight in 29 seconds. His second bout was against rugby league player Paul Gallen. The fight, which lasted only 88 seconds before it was called off when Watts suffered a shoulder injury, was described as "anti-climactic." The Sydney Morning Herald wrote, "The way Watts was swinging them, it's unsurprising he almost threw his arm out of its socket. If this was the fight which brought you to the main event, you were sorely short changed."

1 Wins, 1 Loss, 0 Draws
Res.	Record	Opponent	Type	Rd., Time	Date	Location	Notes
Loss	0–1	(Australia) Paul Gallen	UD	4	2015-11-03	(New Zealand) SkyCity Convention Centre, Auckland	Professional debut.

== Legal problems ==
=== Domestic violence allegations ===
In 2011 Watts was charged with assault after an alleged altercation with his girlfriend earlier that year. The charges were dropped after his partner declined to give a statement, or allow them to photograph her injuries, and potential witnesses decided their testimony was contingent upon hers. After the incident he was dropped by the Roosters.

=== Affray, jail time and bikie gang associations ===
Watts became a member of The Finks and Mongols, bikie gangs under investigation for various gang-related crimes. In 2013, Watts was sentenced to community service for an affray, and to jail for numerous charges, including breaking a domestic violence order for the third time, driving while disqualified and failing to complete community service. In 2014, Watts was out on parole when he was involved in a "drunken ruckus" and returned to jail. His second arrest was featured on Gold Coast Cops when he already disassociated himself with the gangs, but 50ml of Stanozolol steroids was found in his house.

=== Assault charge ===
In August 2016 Watts assaulted a man at a Gold Coast wedding, kneeing and kicking him to the head and stomach. Watts turned himself into the police shortly after, and in 2018 pleaded guilty to assault, was given a suspended sentence and fined $5000.
