= Adam Schubert =

Australian rugby league footballer

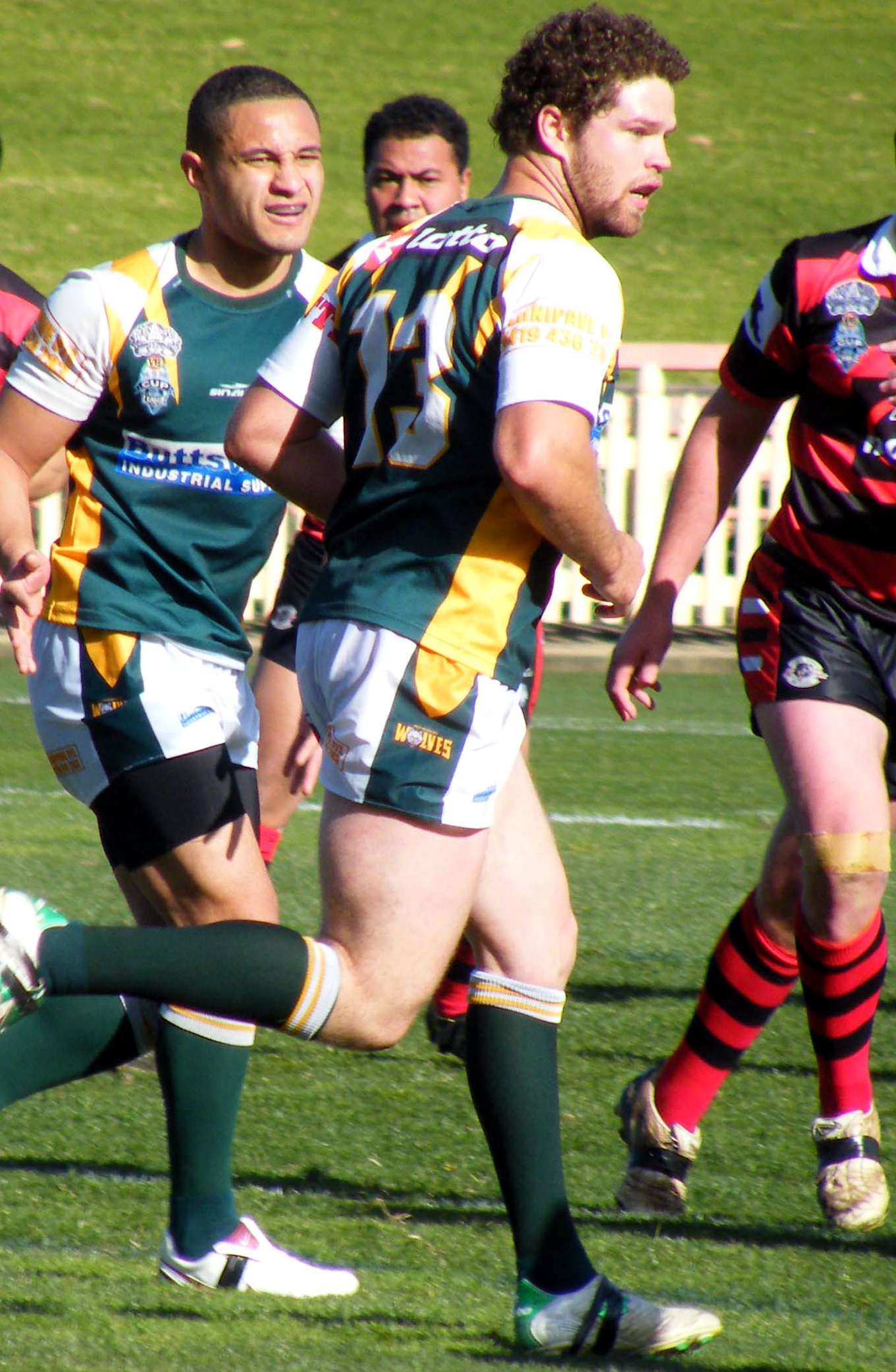

Personal information
- Full name: Adam Schubert
- Born: 12 January 1985 (age 41) Australia
- Height: 186 cm (6 ft 1 in)
- Weight: 95 kg (14 st 13 lb)

Playing information
- Position: Second-row, Lock
Club
Years	Team	Pld	T	G	FG	P
2005	Sydney Roosters	5	1	0	0	4

Adam Schubert (born 12 January 1985) is an Australian former professional rugby league footballer who played in the 2000s. He played for the Sydney Roosters of the National Rugby League, primarily as a second-row.

== Playing career ==
Schubert made his NRL debut in round 13 of the 2005 NRL season against Manly. He scored his first career try against the New Zealand Warriors in round 19. Schubert would later go on to play for Windsor in the NSW Cup.
