= Shannon Gallant =

Australian rugby league footballer

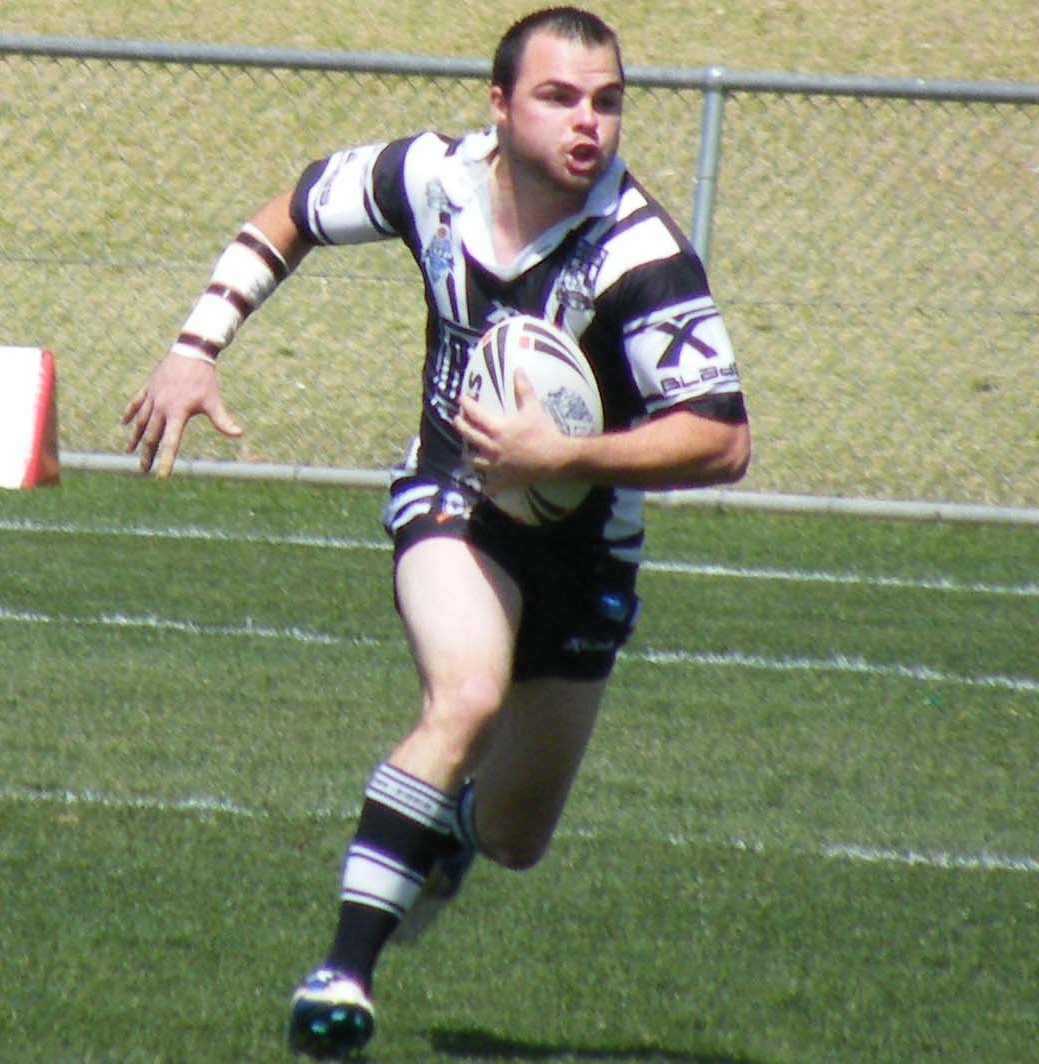

Personal information
- Full name: Shannon Paul Gallant
- Born: 26 February 1986 (age 40) Sydney, New South Wales, Australia
- Height: 172 cm (5 ft 8 in)
- Weight: 77 kg (12 st 2 lb)

Playing information
- Position: Fullback
Club
| Years | Team | Pld | T | G | FG | P |
|---|---|---|---|---|---|---|
| 2007–09 | Wests Tigers | 12 | 4 | 2 | 0 | 20 |
| 2010 | North Qld Cowboys | 9 | 2 | 0 | 0 | 8 |
| | Total | 21 | 6 | 2 | 0 | 28 |
- Source: As of 30 January 2019

Shannon Gallant (born 26 February 1986) is an Australian rugby league footballer. He has played in the National Rugby League (NRL) for the North Queensland Cowboys and the Wests Tigers. He primarily plays as a fullback and is known for his speed and small stature.

== Early life ==
Gallant played junior Rugby league with the Narellan Jets and Campbelltown City Kangaroos, and joined the Western Suburbs Magpies when he was 13 years old.

== Playing career ==
Gallant made his NRL debut for the Wests Tigers (a joint venture between Western Suburbs and Balmain) in 2007, and went on to play 12 games there in three seasons.

Gallant joined the North Queensland Cowboys for the 2010 and 2011 seasons after seeking a release from the Wests Tigers, claiming that there would be more first-grade opportunities for him at the North Queensland club. His contract with North Queensland ended in 2011, having played in nine NRL matches for the club.

Gallant re-emerged in 2014 as a member of the Newtown NSW Cup side, the reserve grade team for NRL club Sydney Roosters. After playing one season with Newtown, Gallant spent the next two seasons back with Western Suburbs and finished as the leading point scorer in the 2016 Ron Massey Cup with 228 points. In 2017, Gallant left Wests to join the Narellan Jets in the local Group 6 competition. In 2018, Gallant joined Sydney Shield side the East Campbelltown Eagles. Gallant went on to win the Sydney Shield with East Campbelltown, his first premiership victory in his 16-year playing career.

== Career highlights ==
- First Grade Debut: 2007 – Round 19, Wests Tigers v New Zealand Warriors, Campbelltown Stadium, 22 July
- Sydney Shield: 2018 premiership winner with East Campbelltown
