= Jamie McDonald (rugby league) =

Australian rugby league footballer

Personal information
- Full name: Jamie McDonald
- Born: 13 January 1977 (age 49) Tweed Heads, New South Wales, Australia

Playing information
- Position: Prop, Second-row
Club
Years	Team	Pld	T	G	FG	P
1998	Adelaide Rams	2	0	0	0	0
1999–04	North Qld Cowboys	48	1	0	0	4
2005	Melbourne Storm	2	0	0	0	0
	Total	52	1	0	0	4
- Source: As of 15 January 2019

Jamie McDonald (born 13 January 1977) is an Australian former professional rugby league footballer who played in the 1990s and 2000s. He played for the Adelaide Rams in 1998, the North Queensland Cowboys from 2000 to 2004 and finally the Melbourne Storm in 2005.

== Playing career ==
In 1998, McDonald played for the Wests Panthers in the Queensland Cup. McDonald made 2 appearances for the now defunct Adelaide side in 1998 including the club's final ever game which was a 34–20 loss against Newcastle.

After the liquidation of Adelaide, McDonald joined North Queensland. In McDonald's first season at the club, North Queensland finished last on the table. In total, McDonald made 48 appearances for the team. McDonald also scored his one and only try in first grade in Round 20 2003 against Canterbury while at the club.

In 2005, McDonald joined Melbourne and his final game in first grade was a 36–16 loss against Penrith.
