= Daniel Abraham (rugby league) =

Australian rugby league footballer

Personal information
- Born: 11 March 1981 (age 45) Belmont, New South Wales, Australia

Playing information
- Height: 188 cm (6 ft 2 in)
- Weight: 106 kg (16 st 10 lb)
- Position: Second-row, Lock, Five-eighth
Club
| Years | Team | Pld | T | G | FG | P |
|---|---|---|---|---|---|---|
| 2000–07 | Newcastle Knights | 100 | 16 | 65 | 0 | 194 |
| 2008 | North Qld Cowboys | 6 | 1 | 0 | 0 | 4 |
| | Total | 106 | 17 | 65 | 0 | 198 |
Representative
| Years | Team | Pld | T | G | FG | P |
| 2003–04 | NSW Country | 2 | 0 | 0 | 0 | 0 |

Daniel Abraham (born 11 March 1981) is an Australian former professional rugby league footballer who previously played for the Newcastle Knights and North Queensland Cowboys of the National Rugby League. He primarily played second-row, lock and five-eighth.

== Background ==
Born in Belmont, New South Wales, Abraham played his junior football for the Booragul-Teralba Bears and Valentine-Eleebana Red Devils before being signed by the Newcastle Knights. Abraham is Jewish.

== Playing career ==
In Round 9 of the 2000 NRL season, he made his NRL debut for the Knights against the Penrith Panthers. After playing just 15 games in the NRL, Abraham came off the bench in Newcastle's 2001 NRL Grand Final win against the Parramatta Eels. Having won the 2001 NRL Premiership, the Knights traveled to England to play the 2002 World Club Challenge against Super League champions, the Bradford Bulls. Abraham played at second-row forward in Newcastle's loss. In 2008, Abraham joined the North Queensland Cowboys for a season.

In 2009, Abraham played for the Mackay Cutters in the Queensland Cup. He scored 162 points for the Cutters before leaving the club at the end of the season. In 2010, Abraham returned to Newcastle to play for the Knights' NSW Cup reserve-grade team, the Central Coast Centurions. In 2011, Abraham returned to his junior club Kurri Kurri and captained the team in 2011 and 2012. In September 2012, Abraham played for the Newcastle Knights NSW Cup reserve-grade team in their qualifying finals match against the North Sydney Bears after being rung by coach Rip Taylor.

== Representative career ==
In 2003, Abraham was selected for the Country Origin team. He was again selected in 2004.
