= Isaak Ah Mau =

Samoa international rugby league footballer

Personal information
- Born: 25 November 1982 (age 43) Auckland, New Zealand

Playing information
- Height: 187 cm (6 ft 2 in)
- Weight: 106 kg (16 st 10 lb)
- Position: Second-row
Club
Years	Team	Pld	T	G	FG	P
2008–09	Brisbane Broncos	4	0	0	0	0
2010–11	North Qld Cowboys	5	0	0	0	0
	Total	9	0	0	0	0
Representative
Years	Team	Pld	T	G	FG	P
2006	Samoa	3	0	0	0	0
2007–08	Queensland Residents	2	0	0	0	0
- Relatives: Leeson Ah Mau (brother)

Isaak Ah Mau (born 25 November 1982) is a former Samoa international rugby league footballer who played as a prop for the North Queensland Cowboys and the Brisbane Broncos in the NRL.

== Background ==
Ah Mau was born in Auckland, New Zealand.

He is the brother of Leeson Ah Mau.

== Playing career ==
Ah Mau played junior rugby league with the Otahuhu Leopards in New Zealand. He debuted for the Brisbane Broncos in the NRL in 2008 after playing for the Ipswich Jets in the Queensland Cup. The following season he remained with the Broncos but played for their Queensland Cup feeder side, Easts Tigers.

He signed with the North Queensland Cowboys for the 2010 and 2011 seasons. Ah Mau also played for the Mackay Cutters in the Queensland Cup. His contract with the Cowboys expired at the end of the 2011 season, and he left the club having appeared in five NRL matches. Isaak was involved in the 2013 Tertiary Student Rugby League World Cup playing for Australia having won the grand final 16–26 over England.
