= Grant Rovelli =

Italy international rugby league footballer

Personal information
- Born: 3 September 1983 (age 42) Mackay, Queensland, Australia

Playing information
- Height: 176 cm (5 ft 9 in)
- Weight: 84 kg (13 st 3 lb; 185 lb)
- Position: Halfback, Five-eighth
Club
| Years | Team | Pld | T | G | FG | P |
|---|---|---|---|---|---|---|
| 2006–08 | New Zealand Warriors | 68 | 15 | 0 | 0 | 60 |
| 2009–10 | North Qld Cowboys | 26 | 1 | 0 | 0 | 4 |
| | Total | 94 | 16 | 0 | 0 | 64 |
Representative
| Years | Team | Pld | T | G | FG | P |
| 2003–12 | Italy | 2 | 0 | 0 | 0 | 0 |
| 2005 | NSW Residents | 1 | 2 | 0 | 0 | 8 |
| 2011–12 | Queensland Residents | 2 | 0 | 0 | 0 | 0 |

Grant Rovelli (born 3 September 1983) is a former Italy international rugby league footballer. From 2006 to 2010 he played in the National Rugby League (NRL) for the New Zealand Warriors and the North Queensland Cowboys. His usual position is halfback.

== Background ==
Born in Mackay, Queensland, Australia, he is of Italian descent.

Rovelli was a South Mackay Sharks junior playing for the North Queensland Cowboys Junior system, Rovelli signed with the Sydney Roosters and moved to Sydney. In Sydney he played for the Sydney Roosters Premier League team for three years, including the 2004 Grand Final winning side and the side that lost the 2005 Grand Final.

== Playing career ==
=== New Zealand Warriors ===
The New Zealand Warriors signed Rovelli before the 2006 season. Head Coach Ivan Cleary had previously met Rovelli during his time at the Roosters. He made his National Rugby League debut in Round One 2006 when he started off the bench. However, later in the season he managed to secure the role of halfback and by the season's end he was a finalist for the Dally M Rookie of the Year award. Rovelli won the Vodafone Young Player of the Year award in the club's annual awards night. His final two seasons with the club were marked by indifferent form that saw him move in and out of the first grade side.

=== North Queensland Cowboys ===
On 3 December 2008 it was announced that the Warriors had released Rovelli from his final year of his contract so he could join the North Queensland Cowboys. He signed for the 2009 and 2010 seasons. Rovelli also played for the Mackay Cutters in the Queensland Cup.

After the end of his Cowboys contract, he captained the Mackay Cutters in the Queensland Cup and in 2011 was part of the Queensland Residents side that defeated the New South Wales Residents 32–6. In 2012 he was named the captain of the Queensland Residents side.

At the end of the 2012 season Rovelli was selected to play for Italy against Fiji.

Rovelli would go on to retire from the Intrust Super Cup at the beginning of 2013 and would sign with Souths Sharks in the Mackay Rugby League A-Grade competition. He would captain Souths Mackay to premiership success in 2013 & 14 before losing the 2015 grand final to the Sarina Crocodiles. In 2016 Rovelli would come out of professional rugby league retirement to once again play for the Mackay Cutters in the Intrust Super Premiership. He would retire from rugby league at the end of the season.
