= Luke Young (rugby league) =

Australian rugby league footballer

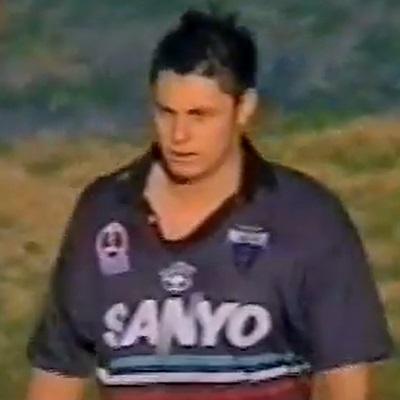

Personal information
- Full name: Luke Young
- Born: 31 August 1980 (age 46) Australia

Playing information
- Position: Fullback, Five-eighth
Club
Years	Team	Pld	T	G	FG	P
2002	Penrith Panthers	5	1	4	0	12
2005	Canterbury Bulldogs	4	0	4	0	8
2006–07	Celtic Crusaders	53	17	21	0	110
	Total	62	18	29	0	130

Luke Young is an Australian former professional rugby league footballer who last played for Welsh side Crusaders in National League Two. He was previously with Penrith Panthers and Canterbury Bulldogs.
