= Shane Muspratt =

Australian rugby league footballer

Personal information
- Born: 13 April 1979 (age 47) Ayr, Queensland, Australia
- Height: 186 cm (6 ft 1 in)
- Weight: 98 kg (15 st 6 lb)

Playing information
- Position: Five-eighth, Lock, Second-row, Hooker
Club
Years	Team	Pld	T	G	FG	P
1999–03	North Qld Cowboys	53	2	0	0	8
2004	Parramatta Eels	6	1	0	0	4
2006–07	North Qld Cowboys	5	0	0	0	0
	Total	64	3	0	0	12
Representative
Years	Team	Pld	T	G	FG	P
2006–07	Queensland Residents	2	0	0	0	0
- Source: As of 4 January 2024

Shane Muspratt (born 13 April 1979 in Ayr, Queensland, Australia) is an Australian former professional rugby league footballer who played for the North Queensland Cowboys and the Parramatta Eels in the NRL.

== Playing career ==
Muspratt made his first grade debut for North Queensland in round 24 of the 1999 NRL season against the Auckland Warriors. He played off the bench in their 40-14 loss. After 53 games for the North Queensland club, Muspratt signed for Parramatta. He made six appearances for the club as they failed to make the finals. In 2005, Muspratt returned to North Queensland. Muspratt's final game for the club was their 2007 preliminary final loss to Manly. Muspratt also played for the Mackay Cutters in the Queensland Cup.
