= 2020 Northern Pride RLFC season =

Coordinates: 16°55′49″S 145°46′2″E

Northern Pride
Club information
- Full name: Northern Pride Rugby League Football Club
- Nickname: The Pride
- Colours: Black, teal and gold
- Founded: 2007
- Website: northernpride.com.au

Current details
- Ground: Barlow Park, Cairns (seating 1,700, standing 15,000)
- CEO: Mark Quinn (2018–2020)
- Coach: Ty Williams (2017–2023)
- Captain: Javid Bowen (2020)
- Competition: Intrust Super Cup
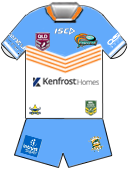
- Home colours
- Current season

Records
- Premierships: 2 (2010, 2014)
- Runners-up: 1 (2009)
- Minor premierships: 3 (2013, 2014, 2024)

2020 was the thirteenth competitive season for the Cairns based Kenfrost Homes Northern Pride Rugby League Football Club. They were one of 14 clubs that competed in the twenty-fifth season of Queensland's top rugby league competition, QRL's Hostplus Cup. The Northern Pride were due to play 12 home games and 11 away games over 23 rounds between March and August, but the season was cancelled after Round One due to the COVID-19 pandemic.

Before the season was cancelled, the Pride played three pre-season trials, two of which attracted large crowds - the trial against the Blackhawks was a curtain-raiser to the NRL Cowboys v Broncos pre-season trial, and the Pride's trial against the Hunters attracted a large ex-pat following.

Coach Ty Williams named a new six-man 'leadership group' composed of Javid Bowen, Rod Griffin, Matolu Laumea, Patrick Gallen, Tom McGrath, and new recruit Josh Stuckey. From this group Williams chose Javid Bowen as captain, and Rod Griffin as vice-captain.

A new three-year naming rights sponsor, Kenfrost Homes was announced in December 2019. The Pride had been without a major sponsor since the Sea Swift sponsorship ended in 2017. The Pride are one of five QCup sides that do not have the financial backing of a major leagues club.

Before Round One, the QRL adopted the NRL's COVID-19 guidelines, which included a 'no fans' policy, meaning the games would be played before empty grandstands.

On 17 March, two days after the completion of Round One, QRL announced the competition would be suspended for ten weeks due to the COVID-19 pandemic. It was hoped QCup would resume with Round 12 in June, but the rapidly deteriorating situation with the pandemic meant on 26 March the Queensland Government announced Stage 1 Restrictions on movements across the Queensland border, which would affect NSW club Tweed Heads Seagulls, PNG club SP Hunters, and the feeder arrangements that Easts Tigers and SC Falcons had with the Melbourne Storm and the Ipswich Jets had with Newcastle Knights. Consequently, the next day QRL cancelled the competition for the 2020 season. QRL managing director Robert Moore stated, "by making this announcement now, it provides our clubs with the opportunity to re-set and turn their attention towards the 2021 season". The Pride reduced to a staff of three, with the CEO, Coach and Commercial Manager Alannah Giuffrida retained on reduced wages. Many of the Pride's New Zealand players returned home before the NZ border closed.

In the absence of football, the Cairns Post ran a series ranking the top fifty Northern Pride players from the last 12 seasons.

As the year progressed, there was talk of staging some games, with the Pride, Blackhawks, Cutters and CQ Capras playing a Northern Championship, but travel costs were prohibitive and the idea was abandoned.

In August the 'Kenfrost Homes Lightning Challenge' was held between two CDRL clubs (Brothers Cairns and Tully Tigers), and two teams from the Pride. The Pride combined their ISC side with their HDC U-20s side to make the 'Pride Giants' and 'Pride Reef Kings'. Games were played in Cairns and Tully over six rounds. Pride coach Ty Williams took a back seat, leaving the coaching to Bevan Walker, Pride's ISC assistant coach, and Dave Scott, Pride's HDC U-20 coach. Controversially, two of Brothers Cairns games were abandoned when match officials were abused. The 'Pride Reef Kings' were undefeated and won the competition.

At the end of the season, Northern Pride football operations manager Chey Bird resigned. CEO Tony Williamson also resigned.

== 2020 Season – Kenfrost Homes Northern Pride ==
- Competition: Intrust Super Cup
- Sponsor: Kenfrost Homes.
- Jersey supplier: ISC.

=== Staff ===
==== Coaches/Trainers ====
- Coach: Ty Williams.
- Assistant coach: Sam Obst.
- Assistant coach: Bevan Walker.
- Hastings Deering Colts U-20 coach: Dave Scott.
- Mal Meninga Cup U-18 coach: Bobby Berg.
- Strength and Conditioning Coach: Scott Callaghan.

==== Captain ====
- Captain: Javid Bowen.
- Vice-captain: Rod Griffin.

==== Managers ====
- Football operations manager: Chey Bird.
- Commercial manager: Alannah Giuffrida.
- Chief executive: Mark Quinn.
- Chairman: Tony Williamson.
- Board Members: Peter Parr (replaced by Micheal Luck), Stephen Devenish, Gail Andrejic, Stephen Tillett, Colin Moore, Ian Lydiard, Terry Medhurst.

== 2020 squad ==
The Pride used 17 players in the one match they played this season. Eight of these players played for the Pride last season, and two of the Cowboys' allocation players had already played for the club. Seven players made their debut this season; four were new signings (Bernard Lewis, Chris Ostwald, Josh Stuckey and Nick Lui-Toso), and three were new Cowboys allocation players (Ben Condon*, Connelly Lemuelu* and Wiremu Greig*). Former Cowboys allocation players Gideon Gela-Mosby and Javid Bowen signed to the Pride for this season.

Javid Bowen (c)
Rod Griffin (vc) (Papua New Guinea)
Bernard Lewis (Papua New Guinea)
Brad Lupi
Cephas Chinfat
Chris Ostwald
Gideon Gela-Mosby
Jack Campagnolo (Italy)
Joe Eichner (United States)
Josh Stuckey
Nick Lui-Toso
Patrick Gallen
Rod Griffin
Matt Egan

Denzel King
Evan Child
Ewan Moore
Mat Laumea
Matthew Musumeci
Pio Seci (Fiji)
Quinlyn Cannon
Shawn Bowen
Steven Tatipata
Taulata Fakalelu
Terrence Casey-Douglas
Tom McGrath

Trial

Beau Berg
Curtly Hope-Hodgetts
Gabriel Bon
Heilum Luki (Samoa)
Jacob McCarthy
Mark Rosendale
Matthew Gibuma
Stanley Anau

North Queensland Cowboys allocation

Ben Condon* (NYC Development)
Connelly Lemuelu* (New Zealand) (Samoa)
Jake Clifford*
Peter Hola*
Wiremu Greig* (NYC Development) (New Zealand)

Trial Match only:
Ben Hampton*

Allocated but did not play for the Pride in 2020:
Coen Hess
Gavin Cooper
Hamiso Tabuai-Fidow
Jordan McLean
Reece Robson

=== Player gains ===
Player	From League	From Club	Notes
Javid Bowen	NRL Telstra Premiership	North Queensland Cowboys	
Gideon Gela-Mosby	NRL Telstra Premiership	North Queensland Cowboys	
Nick Lui-Toso	NRL Telstra Premiership	Penrith Panthers	
Josh Stuckey	NRL Telstra Premiership	Canberra Raiders	
Bernard Lewis	NRL Telstra Premiership	Sydney Roosters	
George Fai	NRL Telstra Premiership	Brisbane Broncos	
Rod Griffin	Intrust Super Cup	Townsville Blackhawks	
Matt Egan	Intrust Super Cup	Burleigh Bears	
Chris Ostwald	Intrust Super Cup	Easts Tigers	
Taulata Fakalelu	CDRL	Innisfail Brothers	
Brooklyn Herewini	Manawatu RL	(New Zealand) Whanganui Boxon	Development player
Raymon Tuaimalo Vaega	NRL U20s	New Zealand Warriors	Development player
Pio Seci	Intrust Super Cup	Ipswich Jets	Problems with his visa meant Seci did not arrive for pre-season training.
Tevin Arona	NZRL National Competition	Canterbury Bulls	Arona was released before the start of the season to return home to New Zealand.
George Fai	Intrust Super Cup	Souths Logan Magpies	Fai signed for the Pride, then changed his mind and signed to rugby union's Queensland Reds.

=== Player losses after 2019 season ===
Player	To League	To Club
Tom Hancock	Intrust Super Cup	Townsville Blackhawks
Connor Jones	English RFL Championship	Featherstone Rovers
Dave Murphy	CDRL	Ivanhoes
James Dempsey	CDRL	Ivanhoes
Hugh Sedger	CDRL	Ivanhoes
Jordan Biondi Odo	CDRL	Brothers Cairns
Jared Allen	CDRL	Kangaroos RLFC
Will Bugden	Retired (concussion)	
Maurice Blair	Retired	
Bradley Stephen	Released	
Cameron Torpy	Released	
Brayden Torpy	Released	

==== Cowboys no longer allocated to the Pride ====
Player	To League	To Club
Enari Tuala*	NRL Telstra Premiership	Newcastle Knights
Nene Macdonald*	NRL Telstra Premiership	Cronulla-Sutherland Sharks
Kurt Baptiste*	Intrust Super Cup	Easts Tigers
Gideon Gela-Mosby*	Intrust Super Cup	Northern Pride
Javid Bowen*	Intrust Super Cup	Northern Pride

=== 2020 season launch ===
- Pre-Season Training: 4 November 2019, West Barlow Park.
- Pre-Season Boot Camp: Daradgee Environmental Education Centre, Innisfail, 17–19 January 2020.
- Professional Development Weekend with NRL coach Anthony Griffin: Daradgee Environmental Education Centre, Innisfail, 8–9 February 2020.
- Season launch: 9 February 2020, Mount Sheridan Plaza, Mount Sheridan.
- Season launch: 7 March 2020, The Pier Bar, Cairns $30.

==== 2020 player records ====
- Most Points: Jake Clifford* (6).
- Most Tries: Jake Clifford* (1), Connelly Lemuelu* (1).

=== Jerseys ===
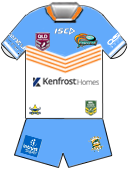
2020 primary Jersey

=== Trial matches ===
Round	Opponent	Score	Date	Venue
Trial 1	Cairns Foley Shield side	32 – 16	Saturday, 15 February 2020	Petersen Park, Edmonton
Trial 2	Townsville Blackhawks	6 – 34	Saturday, 22 February 2020	Barlow Park, Cairns
Trial 3	PNG Hunters	36 – 24	Saturday 29 February 2020	Barlow Park, Cairns

Pre-season Trial 1
Saturday,
15 February 2020

Northern Pride	32 – 16	Cairns Foley Shield side
Tries: Josh Stuckey 1 Steven Tatipata 1 Bernard Lewis 1 Goals: ??		Tries: ?? Goals: ??

Petersen Park
(Edmonton, QLD)

Kenfrost Homes Northern Pride: 1. Cephas Chinfat – FB 2. Matthew Musumeci – WG 3. Steven Tatipata – CE 4. Raymon Tuaimalo-Vaega – CE 5. Bernard Lewis – WG 6. Matthew Egan – FE 7. Jack Campagnolo – HB 8. Matolu Laumea – PR 9. Patrick Gallen – HK 10. Taulata Fakalelu – PR 11. Heilum Luki – SR 12. Josh Stuckey – SR 13. Joe Eichner – LK
Unlimited Interchange: 14. Jacob Wallace, 15. Beau Berg, 16. Terrence Casey-Douglas, 17. Brad Lupi, 18. Jacob McCarthy, 19. Ewan Moore, 20. Gideon Gela-Mosby, 21. Mark Rosendale, 22. Gabriel Bon.
* = Cowboys allocation.
Coach: Ty Williams.
Cairns Marlins Foley Shield Squad: 1. Kienan Grogan-Hayes – FB 2. Linton Enoch – WG 3. Bradley Stephen – CE 4. Dallas Skardon – CE 5. Ronald Ambrym – WG 6. Nathan Curcio – FE 7. Ned Blackman – HB 8. Mitch Ebden – PR 9. Ty Millard – HK 10. Joel Marama – PR 11. Johann Turner – SR 12. Graham Clark Jr – SR 13. Wyatt Barnes – LK
Unlimited Interchange: 14. Rhy Young, 15. Minjiluk McInnes, 16. Richard Joinbee, 17. Masi Nona.
- Note: The temperature reached 40 °C.
  Terrence Casey-Douglas went off with HIA.

Pre-season Trial 2
Saturday,
22 February 2020
16:30 AEST (UTC+10)

Northern Pride	6 – 34	Townsville Blackhawks
Tries: Steven Tatipata 1 Goals: Jack Campagnolo 1		Tries: 1 Jacob Kiraz; 1 Kyle Laybutt; 1 Jake Marketo; 1 Carlin Anderson; 1 Kalifa Fai Fai Loa; 1 Jaelen Feeney; Goals: 5 Carlin Anderson

Barlow Park
(Severin Street, Parramatta Park, QLD)

Kenfrost Homes Northern Pride: 1. Cephas Chinfat – FB 2. Bernard Lewis – WG 3. Javid Bowen – CE 4. Gideon Gela-Mosby – CE 5. Matthew Musumeci – WG 6. Matthew Egan – FE 7. Jack Campagnolo – HB 8. Wiremu Greig* – PR 9. Chris Ostwald – HK 10. Nick Lui-Toso – PR 11. Ben Condon* – SR 12. Tom McGrath – SR 13. Rod Griffin – LK
Unlimited Interchange: 14. Denzel King, 15. Shawn Bowen, 16. Steven Tatipata, 17. Patrick Gallen, 18. Matolu Laumea, 19. Taulata Fakalelu, 20. Ewan Moore, 21. Josh Stuckey, 22. Brad Lupi, 23. Terrence Casey-Douglas.
* = Cowboys allocation (2 players allocated for this match).
Townsville and District Mendi Blackhawks: ?
Coach: Terry Campese.
- Note: This game was played as a curtain-raiser to the North Queensland Cowboys v Brisbane Broncos pre-season trial. This was the first time in 30 years that the Broncos played in Cairns. The game was played in very wet conditions. Pride Prop Taulata Fakalelu was sin-binned in the match for repeated infringements in the ruck. Pride winger Bernard Lewis was placed on report for a shoulder charge late in the game.

Pre-season Trial 3
Saturday,
29 February 2020
17:00 AEST (UTC+10)

Northern Pride	36 – 24	PNG Hunters
Tries: Chris Ostwald 2 Goals: Jack Campagnolo (4 from 7) 4		Tries: ?? Goals: ??

Barlow Park
(Severin Street, Parramatta Park, QLD)

Kenfrost Homes Northern Pride: 1. Cephas Chinfat – FB 2. Shawn Bowen – WG 3. Javid Bowen – CE 4. Gideon Gela-Mosby – CE 5. Bernard Lewis – WG 6. Ben Hampton* – FE 7. Jack Campagnolo – HB 8. Wiremu Greig* – PR 9. Chris Ostwald – HK 10. Nick Lui Toso – PR 11. Ben Condon* – SR 12. Josh Stuckey – SR 13. Peter Hola* – LK
Unlimited Interchange: 14. Patrick Gallen, 15. Tom McGrath, 16. Joe Eichner, 17. Matthew Musumeci, 18. Matolu Laumea, 19. Rod Griffin, 20. Brad Lupi,
* = Cowboys allocation (4 players allocated for this match).
SP PNG Hunters: 1. Terry Wapi – FB 2. Junior Rau – WG 3. Joe Joshua – CE 4. Brendan Nima – CE 5. Brandon Gotuno – WG 6. Charlie Simon – FE 7. Ase Boas (c) – HB 8. Enock Maki – PR 9. Nicky Hasu – HK 10. Junior Rop – PR 11. Epel Kapinias – SR 12. Keven Appo – SR 13. Ila Alu – LK
Unlimited Interchange: 14. Stanely Olo, 15. Rhadley Brawa, 16. Mark Piti, 17. Stanton Albert, 18. Joe Frank, 19. Shane Nigel, 20. Francis Takai.

=== Hostplus Cup matches ===
ROUND 1: Intrust Super Cup 2020

Sunday
15 March 2020
15:00 AEST (UTC+10)

Tweed Heads Seagulls	16 – 10	Northern Pride
Tries: Fetuli Talanoa (5') 1 Lee Turner (26') 1 Kody Parsons (72') 1 Goals: Lindon McGrady (1 from 3) 1 Penalty Goals; Lindon McGrady 1	Half-time: 8 – 10; Penalties: 8 – 8 QRL Report	Tries: 1 Jake Clifford* (0'); 1 Connelly Lemuelu* (14') Goals: 1 Jake Clifford* (1 from 2); Penalty Goals; 0

Venue:
Tugun RLFC
(Betty Diamond Complex, Tugun, QLD)
Referee: Ethan Menchin, Jarrod Cole

Kenfrost Homes Northern Pride: 1. Cephas Chinfat – FB 2. Gideon Gela-Mosby – WG 3. Javid Bowen (c) – CE 4. Connelly Lemuelu* – CE 5. Bernard Lewis – WG 6. Jack Campagnolo – FE 7. Jake Clifford* – HB 8. Nick Lui-Toso – PR 9. Chris Ostwald – HK 10. Wiremu Greig* – PR 11. Ben Condon* – SR 12. Josh Stuckey – SR 13. Peter Hola* – LK
Interchange: 14. Patrick Gallen, 15. Joe Eichner, 16. Rod Griffin (vc), 17. Brad Lupi.
Reserve: 18. Matthew Egan, 19. Denzel King, 20. Mat Laumea, 21. Matthew Musumeci.
(* = Cowboys allocation - 5 players allocated for this match).
Tweed Heads Seagulls: 1. Lindon McGrady – FB 2. Ryland Jacobs – WG 3. Lee Turner – CE 4. Fetuli Talanoa – CE 5. Caleb Hodges – WG 6. Will Brimson – FE 7. Blake Goodman – HB 8. Bayley Faull – PR 9. Brent Woolf – HK 10. Stuart Mason – PR 11. Lamar Manuel-Liolevave (c) – SR 12. Kody Parsons – SR 13. Jamie Hill – LK
Interchange: 14. Liam Hampson, 15. Ioane Seiuli, 16. Rory Lillisayer, 17. Fabien Paletua-Kiri.
(* = Gold Coast Titans allocation).
- Note: The match was relocated to Tugun in Queensland from the Seagulls usual home ground at Piggabeen Sports Complex, Tweed Heads West in NSW due to heavy rain affecting the playing surface.
  This was the Pride debut for Bernard Lewis, Nick Lui-Toso, Chris Ostwald, and Josh Stuckey, (Pride Players 170-172 & 175), and North Queensland Cowboys allocation players Connelly Lemuelu*, Wiremu Greig* and Ben Condon* (Pride Players 169 & 173-174).

Position	Round 1 – 2020	P	W	D	L	B	For	Against	Diff	Pts
11	Northern Pride	1	0	0	1	0	32	16	-16	2

=== 2020 ladder ===
2020 Queensland Cup
Pos	Team	Pld	W	D	L	PF	PA	PD	Pts
1	Easts Tigers	1	1	0	0	44	4	+40	2
2	Burleigh Bears	1	1	0	0	34	6	+28	2
3	Tweed Heads Seagulls	1	1	0	0	16	10	+6	2
4	Townsville Blackhawks	1	1	0	0	16	10	+6	2
5	Redcliffe Dolphins	1	1	0	0	22	16	+6	2
6	Papua New Guinea Hunters	1	1	0	0	32	30	+2	2
7	Norths Devils	1	1	0	0	23	22	+1	2
8	Mackay Cutters	1	0	0	1	22	23	-1	0
9	Souths Logan Magpies	1	0	0	1	30	32	-2	0
10	Sunshine Coast Falcons	1	0	0	1	16	22	-6	0
11	Northern Pride	1	0	0	1	10	16	-6	0
12	Ipswich Jets	1	0	0	1	10	16	-6	0
13	Wynnum Manly Seagulls	1	0	0	1	6	34	-28	0
14	Central Queensland Capras	1	0	0	1	4	44	-40	0

==== QCup matches cancelled due to COVID-19 ====
Round	Date	Venue	Home	Away
Round 2	Saturday 21 March 2020	Pathion Park, Brisbane	Norths Devils	Northern Pride
Round 3	Saturday 28 March 2020	Barlow Park, Cairns	Northern Pride	Suzuki Brisbane Tigers
Round 4	Saturday 4 April 2020	Barlow Park, Cairns	Northern Pride	CQ Capras
Round 5	Sunday 12 April 2020	National Football Stadium, Port Moresby	SP PNG Hunters	Northern Pride
Round 6	Sunday 19 April 2020	CDJRL Grounds, Jones Park, Cairns	Northern Pride	Mackay Cutters
Round 7	Sunday 26 April 2020	Jack Manski Oval, Townsville	Townsville Blackhawks	Northern Pride
Round 8	Sunday 3 May 2020	Sunshine Coast Stadium, Sunshine Coast	SC Falcons	Northern Pride
Round 9	Saturday 9 May 2020	Barlow Park, Cairns	Northern Pride	Redcliffe Dolphins
Round 10	Sunday 24 May 2020	Barlow Park, Cairns	Northern Pride	Ipswich Jets
Round 11	Saturday 30 May 2020	BMD Kougari Oval, Brisbane	Wynnum Manly Seagulls	Northern Pride
Round 12	Sunday 7 June 2020	Davies Park, Brisbane	Souths Logan Magpies	Northern Pride
Round 13	Saturday 13 June 2020	Barlow Park, Cairns	Northern Pride	SP PNG Hunters
Round 14	Saturday 27 June 2020	Dolphin Stadium, Brisbane	Redcliffe Dolphins	Northern Pride
Round 15	Saturday 4 July 2020	Barlow Park, Cairns	Northern Pride	Tweed Seagulls
Round 16	Saturday 11 July 2020	Barlow Park, Cairns	Northern Pride	Townsville Blackhawks
Round 17	Saturday 18 July 2020	TBA (Country Week)	Northern Pride	Burleigh Bears
Round 18	Saturday 25 July 2020	Totally Workwear Stadium, Brisbane	Suzuki Brisbane Tigers	Northern Pride
Round 19	Saturday 1 August 2020	Barlow Park, Cairns	Northern Pride	SC Falcons
Round 20	Saturday 8 August 2020	Browne Park, Rockhampton	CQ Capras	Northern Pride
Round 21	Saturday 15 August 2020	BB Print Stadium, Mackay	Mackay Cutters	Northern Pride
Round 22	Saturday 22 August 2020	Barlow Park, Cairns	Northern Pride	Wynnum Manly Seagulls
Round 23	Saturday 29 August 2020	Barlow Park, Cairns	Northern Pride	Norths Devils

== 2020 Northern Pride players ==
Pride player	Appearances	Tries	Goals	Field goals	Pts
Bernard Lewis	1	0	0	0	0
Brad Lupi	1	0	0	0	0
Cephas Chinfat	1	0	0	0	0
Chris Ostwald	1	0	0	0	0
Gideon Gela-Mosby	1	0	0	0	0
Jack Campagnolo	1	0	0	0	0
Javid Bowen	1	0	0	0	0
Joe Eichner	1	0	0	0	0
Josh Stuckey	1	0	0	0	0
Nick Lui-Toso	1	0	0	0	0
Patrick Gallen	1	0	0	0	0
Rod Griffin	1	0	0	0	0

=== North Queensland Cowboys who played for the Pride in 2020 ===
Cowboys player	Appearances	Tries	Goals	Field goals	Pts
Ben Condon*	1	0	0	0	0
Connelly Lemuelu*	1	1	0	0	4
Jake Clifford*	1	1	1	0	6
Peter Hola*	1	0	0	0	0
Wiremu Greig*	1	0	0	0	0

=== 2020 Cairns 'Lightning Challenge' ===
Lightning Challenge: Week 1, Game 1

Saturday,
8 August 2020
14:00 AEST (UTC+10)

Pride Reef Kings	30 – 22	CDRL Brothers Cairns
Tries: Ricky Wardle; Shaun Stephens; Kurt Jackson 2 Denzel King; Goals:		Tries: Calan Dunbar 2 Jackson Clarke; Isaiah Wigness Goals:

Stan Williams Park
(Manunda, QLD)

Pride Reef Kings: 1. Mark Rosendale – FB 2. Jayson Mura – WG 3. Tyreece Chambers – CE 4. Rhy Young – CE 5. Shaun Stephens – WG 6. Sterling Addo Nona – FE 7. Evan Child (c) – HB 8. Jonah Rameka – PR 9. Denzel King – HK 10. Ricky Wardle – PR 11. Daniel Lazarus – SR 12. Ewan Moore – SR 13. Lata Fakelelu – LK
Interchange: 14. Terrence Casey-Douglas 15. Zane Knowles 16. Luke Erbacher 17. Kurt Jackson 18. Quinlyn Cannon
Coach: Dave Scott (Pride's U-20 Coach).
Brothers Cairns: ?
Coach: Paul Stevens.

Lightning Challenge: Week 1, Game 2

Saturday,
8 August 2020
16:00 AEST (UTC+10)

Pride Reef Giants	44 – 12	CDRL Tully Tigers
Tries: Matthew Musumeci; Jack Campagnolo 2 Joe Eichner; Adam Hepworth; Heilum Luki; Matt Egan 2 Goals: Matt Egan; Jack Campagnolo 6		Tries: Phil Nona; Shaun Nona Goals: Shaun Nona 2

Stan Williams Park
(Manunda, QLD)

Pride Reef Giants: 1. Matthew Musumeci – FB 2. Gideon Gela-Mosby – WG 3. Aiden Kawiri – CE 4. Bernard Lewis – CE 5. Kyle Wyatt – WG 6. Jack Campagnolo (c) – FE 7. Matthew Egan – HB 8. Brad Lupi – PR 9. Chris Ostwald – HK

10. Tyson Phineasa – PR 11. Josh Stuckey – SR 12. Heilum Luki – SR 13. Joe Eichner – LK

Interchange: 14. Adam Hepworth 15. Colt Salmond 16. Dmitri Ahwang 17. Jacob McCarthy
Coach: Bevan Walker (Pride's Intrust Super Cup Assistant Coach).
Tully Tigers: 1. Benn Campagnolo, 2. Ronald Uhila, 3. Steven Stafford, 4. Michael Carroll, 5. Jackson Laza, 6. Tai Namaibai, 7. Jacob Rix, 8. Masiru Nona, 9. Ryan Flegler, 10. Fabian Tauli, 11. Dan Sagigi, 12. Cameron Vecchio, 13. Marcus Nona.
Interchange: 14. Jack Myatt, 17. Shaun Nona, 18. Mitchell Robertson, 19. Phil Nona, 20. Fred Koraba.
Coach: Paul Ketchell.

Lightning Challenge: Week 2, Game 1

Saturday,
15 August 2020
14:00 AEST (UTC+10)

Pride Reef Kings	19 – 18	CDRL Tully Tigers
Tries: Ewan Moore 2 Dallas Skardon Goals: Quinlyn Cannon 3 Field Goals: Evan Child.		Tries: Benn Campagnolo; Jackson Laza; Ben Cocciolone; Cody Macintosh; Goals: Phil Nona 1.

Stan Williams Park
(Manunda, QLD)

Pride Reef Kings: 1. Mark Rosendale – FB 2. Sireli Raivaroro – WG 3. Rhy Young – CE 4. Dallas Skardon – CE 5. Samisoni Raivaroro – WG 6. Evan Child (c) – FE 7. Quinlyn Cannon – HB 8. Tyson Phineasa – PR 9. Denzel King – HK 10. Jonah Rameka – PR 11. Ewan Moore – SR 12. Tom McGrath – SR 13. Jacob McCarthy – LK
Interchange: 14. Patrick Gallen 15. Colt Salmond 16. Sterling Addo Nona 17. Ricky Wardle
Coach: Dave Scott (Pride's U-20 Coach).
Tully Tigers: ?

Lightning Challenge: Week 2, Game 2

Saturday,
15 August 2020
16:00 AEST (UTC+10)

CDRL Brothers Cairns	0 – 28	Pride Reef Giants
		Tries: Aiden Kawiri 2 Dmitri Ahwang; Javid Bowen; Josh Stuckey; Heilum Luki; Goals: Jack Campagnolo 2.

Stan Williams Park
(Manunda, QLD)

Pride Reef Giants: 1. Dmitri Ahwang – FB 2. Matthew Musumeci – WG 3. Javid Bowen (c) – CE 4. Bernard Lewis – CE 5. Aiden Kawiri – WG 6. Jack Campagnolo (c) – FE 7. Matthew Egan – HB 8. Lata Fakalelu – PR 9. Chris Ostwald – HK 10. Brad Lupi – PR 11. Josh Stuckey – SR 12. Heilum Luki – SR 13. Terrence Casey-Douglas – LK
Interchange: 14. Adam Hepworth 15. Joe Eichner 16. Whyatt Barnes 17. Usaia Fonongaloa
Coach: Bevan Walker (Pride's Intrust Super Cup Assistant Coach).
Brothers Cairns: 1. Jackson Clarke, 2. Luke Fleming, 3. Isaiah Wigness, 4. Calan Dunbar, 5. Peter Tuccandidgee, 6. Jordan Biondi-Odo, 7. Theo Majid, 8. Dru Hetet, 9. Tom Spark, 10. Corey Child, 11. Tye Smith, 12. Kyle Hansen, 13. Lee Kennedy.
Interchange: 14. Lachlan Biondi-Odo, 15. Elijah Simpson, 16. Dennis Dau, 17. Thauki Satrick, 18. Elliot Gibuma.
Coach: Paul Stevens
- Note: This game was abandoned in the 67th minute.
  Bernard Lewis was sin-binned after a minor scuffle in the 21st minute. Dennis Dau sent off for throwing a punch in the 66th minute.
  A melee broke out, a penalty was awarded to the Reef Giants. After the penalty Brothers players and on-field trainers abused the match officials, who called off the game.

Lightning Challenge: Week 3, Game 1

Saturday,
22 August 2020
14:00 AEST (UTC+10)

Pride Reef Kings	40 – 20	Pride Reef Giants
Tries: Sammi Raivaroro 2 Dallas Skardon 2 Tyreyce Chambers; Tom McGrath; Ewan Moore; Jacob McCarthy; Goals: Evan Child 3 Tyreyce Chambers.		Tries: Dmitri Ahwang; Aiden Kawiri-Kusu; Jack Campagnolo; Jesse Jackon Goals: Jack Campagnolo 2.

Tully Showgrounds
(Tully, QLD)

Pride Reef Kings: 1. Mark Rosendale – FB 2. Sireli Raivaroro – WG 3. Tyreece Chambers – CE 4. Dallas Skardon – CE 5. Samisoni Raivaroro – WG 6. Patrick Gallen – FE 7. Evan Child (c) – HB 8. Jonah Rameka – PR 9. Adam Hepworth – HK 10. Brad Lupi – PR 11. Tom McGrath – SR 12. Ewan Moore – SR 13. Jacob McCarthy – LK
Interchange: 14. Luke Erbacher 15. Tyson Phineasa 16. Matthew Whybird 17. Munro Mosby 18. Zane Knowles
Coach: Dave Scott (Pride's U-20 Coach).
Pride Reef Giants: 1. Dmitri Ahwang – FB 2. Jayson Mura – WG 3. Aiden Kawiri – CE 4. Kyle Wyatt – CE 5. Shaun Stephens – WG 6. Jack Campagnolo (c) – FE 7. Starling Addo Nona – HB 8. Lata Fakalelu – PR 9. Denzel King – HK 10. Ricky Wardle – PR 11. Terrence Casey-Douglas – SR 12. Heilum Luki – SR 13. Matti Moyle – LK
Interchange: 14. Colt Salmond 15. Jesse Jackson 16. Whyatt Barnes 17. Usaia Fonongaloa
Coach: Bevan Walker (Pride's Intrust Super Cup Assistant Coach).
- Note: This game marked the opening of Tully Tigers new grandstand.
  In this week's Game 2, Tully Tigers beat Cairns Brothers 40-18.

Lightning Challenge: Week 4, Game 2

Saturday,
29 August 2020
16:00 AEST (UTC+10)

Pride Reef Giants	36 – 18	Pride Reef Kings
Tries: Goals:		Tries: Goals:

Stan Williams Park
(Manunda, QLD)

Pride Reef Giants: 1. Matthew Musemeci – FB 2. Shaun Stephens – WG 3. Aiden Kawiri – CE 4. Munro Mosby – CE 5. Kyle Wyatt – WG 6. Jack Campagnolo (c) – FE 7. Dmitri Ahwang – HB 8. Lata Fakalelu – PR 9. Patrick Gallen – HK 10. Colt Salmond – PR 11. Matti Moyle – SR 12. Heilum Luki – SR 13. Whyatt Barnes – LK
Interchange: 14. Denzel King 15. Jesse Jackson 16. Terrence Casey-Douglas 17. Usaia Fonongaloa
Coach: Bevan Walker (Pride's Intrust Super Cup Assistant Coach)
Pride Reef Kings: 1. Mark Rosendale – FB 2. Sireli Raivaroro – WG 3. Shawn Bowen – CE 4. Dallas Skardon – CE 5. Samisoni Raivaroro – WG 6. Matt Egan – FE 7. Evan Child (c) – HB 8. Jonah Rameka – PR 9. Adam Hepworth – HK 10. Brad Lupi – PR 11. Josh Stuckey – SR 12. Ewan Moore – SR 13. Tom McGrath – LK
Interchange: 14. Jacob McCarthy 15. Tyson Phineasa 16. Matthew Whybird 17. Sterling Addo Nona 18. Cephas Chinfat
Coach: Dave Scott (Pride's U-20 Coach)
- Note: This game marked the 10-year anniversary of the Pride's inaugural Intrust Super Cup premiership, and was Northern Pride Old Boys' Day.
  In this week's Game 1, Tully Tigers defeated Cairns Brothers 32–26.

Lightning Challenge: Week 5, Game 1

Saturday,
5 September 2020
16:00 AEST (UTC+10)

Pride Reef Giants	Pride Reef Giants won by 50 points	CDRL Tully Tigers
Tries: Goals:		Tries: Goals:

Stan Williams Park
(Manunda, QLD)

Pride Reef Giants: Team ???
Coach: Bevan Walker (Pride's Intrust Super Cup Assistant Coach)
Tully Tigers: Team ???

Lightning Challenge: Week 5, Game 2

Saturday,
5 September 2020
18:00 AEST (UTC+10)

CDRL Brothers Cairns	26 – 14	Pride Reef Kings
Tries: Jack Campagnolo; Aiden Kawiri; Dallas Skardon; Chris Ostwald; Cephas Chinfat; Goals: Jack Campagnolo		Tries: Elliot Gibuma; Eddie Ingui; Tye Smith Goals:

Stan Williams Park
(Manunda, QLD)

Pride Reef Kings: 1. Matthew Musumeci – FB 2. Sireli Raivaroro – WG 3. – CE 4. – CE 5. Samisoni Raivaroro – WG 6. Evan Child – FE 7. Jack Campagnolo – HB 8. Ricky Wardle – PR 9. Chris Ostwald – HK 10. Johan Rameka – PR 11. Matti Moyle – SR 12. Terrence Casey-Douglas – SR 13. Jacob McCarthy – LK
Interchange: 14. Adam Hepworth 15. Luke Erbacher 16. Aiden Kawiri 17. Tyson Phinesa
Coach: Dave Scott (Pride's U-20 Coach).
Brothers Cairns: 1. Andrew Garrett, 2. Luke Fleming, 3. Dennis Dau, 4. Calan Dunbar, 5. Peter Tuccandidgee, 6. Elliot Gibuma, 7. Lachlan Biondi-Odo, 8. Tye Smith, 9. Tom Spark, 10. Nick Harrold, 11. Jarvis Yeatman, 12. Gabriel Bon, 13. Fletcher Harrold.
Interchange: 14. Keishon Hunter-Flanders, 15. Billy Segeyaro, 16. Jackson Clark, 17. Milton Mossman, 18. Matti Gibuma, 20. Eddie Ingui, 21. Boshay Satrick.
Coach: Paul Stevens
- Note: The match was abandoned in the 60th minute after Brothers players and on-field trainers abused the match officials, who called off the game. This was the second time a game between these sides was called off.

Lightning Challenge: Week 6, Game 1

Saturday,
12 September 2020
16:30 AEST (UTC+10)

Pride Reef Giants	28 – 22	CDRL Brothers Cairns
Tries: Samisoni Raivaroro 2 Patrick Gallen; Adam Hepworth; Usaia Fonogaloa Goals: Cephas Chinfat 4		Tries: Eddie Ingui; Calan Dunbar; Boshay Satrick; Luke Fleming; Keishon Hunter-Flanders; Goals:

Tully Showgrounds
(Tully, QLD)

Pride Reef Giants: 1. Cephas Chinfat – FB 2. Shaun Stephens – WG 3. Samisoni Raivaroro – CE 4. Kyle Wyatt – CE 5. Sireli Raivaroro – WG 6. Patrick Gallen – FE 7. Dmitri Ahwang – HB 8. Usaia Fonogaloa – PR 9. Denzel King – HK 10. Colt Salmond – PR 11. Matti Moyle – SR 12. Terrence Casey-Douglas – SR 13. Tyson Phinesea – LK
Interchange: 14. Adam Hepworth 15. Jesse Jackson 16. Matthew Whybird 17. Shawn Stephens 18. Ricky Wardle
Coach: Bevan Walker (Pride's Intrust Super Cup Assistant Coach)
Brothers Cairns: 1. Andrew Garrett, 2. Luke Fleming, 3. Boshay Satrick, 4. Calan Dunbar, 5. Peter Tuccandidgee, 6. Fletcher Harrold, 7. Lachlan Biondi-Odo, 8. Tye Smith, 9. Tom Spark, 10. Nick Harrold, 11. Jarvis Yeatman, 12. Darcy Simpson, 13. Greg Delaney.
Interchange: 14. Keishon Hunter-Flanders, 15. Eddie Ingui, 16. Kyle Hansen, 17. Lassiman Baird.
Coach: Paul Stevens.

Lightning Challenge: Week 6, Game 2

Saturday,
12 September 2020
18:00 AEST (UTC+10)

Pride Reef Kings	46 – 18	CDRL Tully Tigers
Tries: Goals:		Tries: Goals:

Tully Showgrounds
(Tully, QLD)

Pride Reef Kings: 1. Matthew Musumeci – FB 2. Bernard Lewis – WG 3. Aiden Kawiri – CE 4. Dallas Skardon – CE 5. Gideon Gela-Mosby – WG 6. Evan Child – FE 7. Jack Campagnolo – HB 8. Brad Lupi – PR 9. Chris Ostwald – HK 10. Johan Rameka – PR 11. Ewan Moore – SR 12. Josh Stuckey – SR 13. Tom McGrath – LK
Interchange:

14. Adam Hepworth 15. Luke Erbacher 16. Jacob McCarthy 17. Heilum Luki 18. Lata Fakalelu 19. Whyatt Barnes

Coach: Dave Scott (Pride's U-20 Coach).
Tully Tigers: Team ???

==== 2020 Cairns 'Lightning Challenge' ladder ====
2020 Kenfrost Homes 'Lightning Challenge'
Pos	Team	Pld	W	D	L	PD	Pts
1	Pride Reef Kings	6	6	0	0	+87	12
2	Pride Reef Giants	6	4	0	0	+76	8
3	CDRL Tully Tigers	6	2	0	4	-81	12
4	CDRL Cairns Brothers	6	0	0	6	-82	0

=== Cairns Post Top 50 Pride players (2008-2020) ===
In the absence of football during the pandemic, Rowan Sparkes, sports writer at the Cairns Post published an article ranking the top fifty Northern Pride players from the last 12 seasons.

- 1. Chris Sheppard, (halfback), foundation captain, 60 games (2008-2010), Operations Manager (2008-2010), Chief Executive Officer (2011-2013).
- 2. Jason Roos, (hooker), 164 games (2008-2015), co-captain (2014).
- 3. Chey Bird, (fullback), 96 games (2008-2012), most points in a season (216 points 2011), most points scored (574 points - 23 tries, 226 goals, 2008-2012).
- 4. Brett Anderson, (centre), 125+ games (2008, 2010-2015, 2018).
- 5. Ben Spina, (second-row), 140+ games (2010-2017).
- 6. Joel Riethmuller, (lock), (2008-2014, 2017).
- 7. Sam Obst, (halfback), 74 games (2013-2015).
- 8. Ben Laity, (prop), 117 games (2008-2013).
- 9. Ty Williams, (centre), (2008-2015), captain (2011-2013), coach (2017-2023).
- 10. Hezron Murgha, (fullback, threequarters), (2008-2014).
- 11. Ryan Ghietti, (halfback, bench utility), 169 games (2011-2018), captain (2016-2018).
- 12. Alex Starmer, (front rower), 120 games (2008-2015), Members’ Player of the Year in 2012.
- 13. Shaun Nona, (five-eighth).
- 14. Mark Cantoni, 69 games (2008-2011), Best Forward 2008.
- 15. Ethan Lowe, (2012-2018), Rookie of the Year 2012, Best Forward 2013.
- 16. Javid Bowen, (2014-2020)
- 17. Davin Crampton, (fullback, wing, centre, second-row, lock), (2011-2014),
- 18. Tom Hancock, 108 games (2014-2018), Most Improved Player 2015, Best Forward 2016, Player of the Year 2019, Players’ Player 2019, Members Player of the Year 2019, and Best Forward 2019.
- 19. Linc Port, (fullback), 47 games (2014-2016).
- 20. Kyle Feldt, (2013-2014).
- 21. Blake Leary, (2011-2014).
- 22. Luke Harlen, (2008-2009, 2011-20012), Best Forward, 2011.
- 23. Rod Jensen, 69 games (2009-2012), Chief Executive officer (2015-2016).
- 24. David Murphy, (2015-2016, 2018-2019), Player of the Year 2015.
- 25. Noel Underwood, 77 games (2008-2013)
- 26. Will Bugden, 55 games (2017-2019), Player's Player 2018, Member's Player of the Year 2018.
- 27. Jake Clifford, (halfback), (2018-2020).
- 28. Rod Griffin, (2008-2010, 2019-2020).
- 29. Darryn Schonig, (2016-2019).
- 30. Khan Ahwang,
- 31. Connor Jones,
- 32. Jack Svendsen,
- 33. Tyrone McCarthy,
- 34. Nick Slyney,
- 35. Graham Clark,
- 36. Ryan Stig,
- 37. Ricky Thorby,
- 38. Tom Humble,
- 39. Semi Tadulala,
- 40. Sheldon Powe-Hobbs,
- 41. Justin Castellaro,
- 42. Greg Byrnes,
- 43. Michael Bani,
- 44. Clint Amos,
- 45. Vaipuna Tia Kilifi,
- 46. Jackson Nicolau,
- 47. Mark Dalle Cort,
- 48. Jamie Frizzo,
- 49. Luke George,
- 50. Josh Vaughan,
