= Dean McGilvray =

English rugby league footballer

Personal information
- Born: 24 April 1988 (age 37) St Helens, Merseyside, England

Playing information
- Position: Wing
Club
Years	Team	Pld	T	G	FG	P
2006–08	St Helens	6	1	0	0	4
2009–10	Salford City Reds	16	5	0	0	20
2011–12	Leigh Centurions	38	15	0	0	60
2013	Barrow Raiders	22	4	0	0	16
	Total	82	25	0	0	100
- Source: As of 11 Jul 2022

Dean McGilvray is an English rugby league footballer. A diminutive wing, he made his début for St. Helens in 2006 against the Catalans Dragons.

McGilvray joined Super League side Salford City Reds for the 2009 season.

In 2011, he signed with the Co-operative Championship side, Leigh Centurions, winning the Northern Rail Cup in his first season in a 20–16 win over Halifax at Bloomfield Road.

In 2015, he made four appearances for the Cairns-based Northern Pride in the Queensland Cup.
