= Jack Campagnolo =

Italy international rugby league footballer

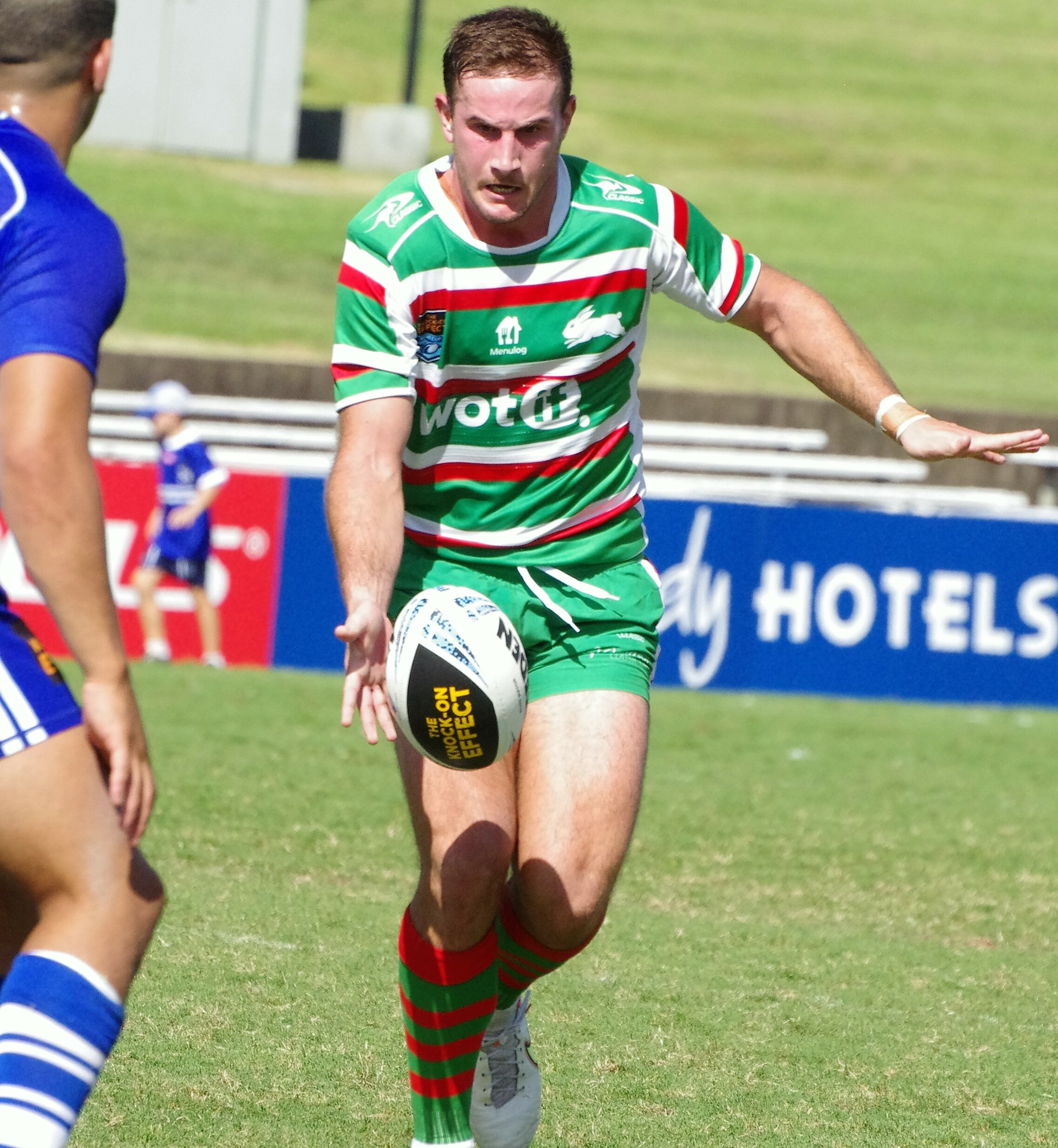

Personal information
- Full name: Jack Campagnolo
- Born: 15 June 1998 (age 28) Tully, Queensland, Australia
- Height: 5 ft 11 in (1.80 m)
- Weight: 13 st 10 lb (87 kg)

Playing information
- Position: Stand-off
Club
Years	Team	Pld	T	G	FG	P
2017–2020	Northern Pride	28	4	27	0	70
2021	Wynnum Manly Seagulls	18	2	78	1	165
2022	South Sydney Rabbitohs	21	3	4	0	20
2023	Souths Logan Magpies	22	3	90	0	192
2024	London Broncos	14	2	0	0	8
2025–	Townsville Blackhawks	25	4	57	2	132
	Total	128	18	256	3	587
Representative
Years	Team	Pld	T	G	FG	P
2017–	Italy	6	2	15	0	38
- Source: As of 21 May 2026

Jack Campagnolo (born 15 June 1998) is an Italy international rugby league footballer who plays as a stand-off for the Townsville Blackhawks in the Queensland Cup.

== Background ==
Campagnolo was born in Tully, Queensland, Australia. He is of Italian descent.

== Playing career ==
=== Club career ===
Campagnolo played in 21 games, and scored 3 tries for the South Sydney Rabbitohs in the 2022 NSW Cup.

=== London Broncos ===
On 15 January 2024 it was reported that he had signed for London Broncos in the Super League.

=== International career ===
In 2022 Campagnolo was named in the Italy squad for the 2021 Rugby League World Cup.
