= Wiremu Greig =

New Zealand rugby league footballer

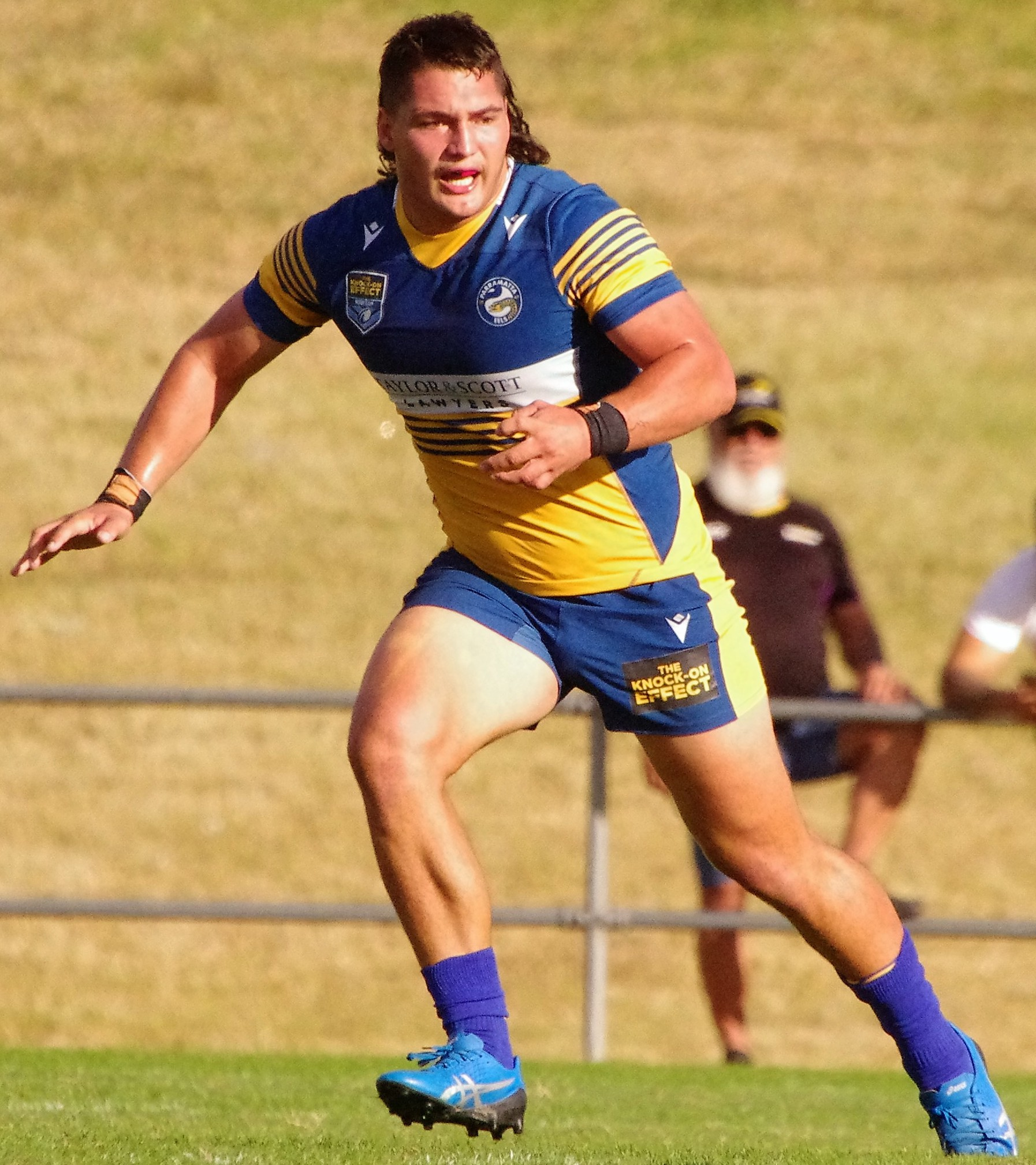
- Greig in 2021

Personal information
- Full name: Wiremu Greig
- Born: 12 November 1999 (age 27) Whangārei, New Zealand
- Height: 192 cm (6 ft 4 in)
- Weight: 116 kg (18 st 4 lb)

Playing information
- Position: Prop
Club
Years	Team	Pld	T	G	FG	P
2021–24	Parramatta Eels	27	1	0	0	4
2026	North Queensland Cowboys	3	0	0	0	0
2027–	Leeds Rhinos	0	0	0	0	0
	Total	30	1	0	0	4
Representative
Years	Team	Pld	T	G	FG	P
2021–22	Māori All Stars	2	0	0	0	0
- Source: As of 20 November 2026

Wiremu Greig (born 12 November 1999) is a New Zealand professional rugby league footballer plays as a prop for the Leeds Rhinos in the Super League and the New Zealand Māori at international level. He previously played for the Parramatta Eels and North Queensland Cowboys in the NRL.

== Background ==
Greig began his rugby league career playing for Northland in the 2017 New Zealand Rugby League National Championships before being signed by the North Queensland Cowboys at age 17.

== Playing career ==
=== 2020 ===
Greig played for North Queensland in NYC in 2018 & 2019, featuring for Northern Pride and the Townsville Blackhawks in the Queensland Cup in 2019 and 2020. Greig was added the North Queensland development roster for the 2020 season, with COVID-19 pandemic causing Greig to only appear in 1 Queensland Cup game for the 2020 season.

=== 2021 ===
In 2021, Greig was a late inclusion for the Māori All Stars team playing the Indigenous All Stars in the 2021 NRL All Stars clash, coming off the bench in a 10–10 draw at Queensland Country Bank Stadium.

Greig was granted an immediate release from North Queensland, signing with the Parramatta Eels until the end of 2023. In round 6, 2021, Greig made his NRL debut for Parramatta against Canberra at GIO Stadium, coming off the bench in a 35–10 win.

=== 2022 ===
Greig made one appearance for Parramatta in the 2022 NRL season which was against St. George Illawarra. Greig played off the bench in Parramatta's 48–14 victory.

=== 2023 ===
In round 13 of the 2023 NRL season, Greig scored his first try in the NRL during Parramatta's 24–16 victory over his former club North Queensland. On 7 June 2023, it was announced that Greig would be ruled out indefinitely after requiring surgery for a lisfranc injury. In round 23 of the 2023 NRL season, Greig was named to make his return to the Parramatta side in their game against St. George Illawarra. Greig played a total of 16 matches for Parramatta in the 2023 NRL season as the club finished 10th on the table. On 25 September, Greig re-signed with Parramatta until the end of the 2026 season.

=== 2024 ===
Greig was limited to only seven appearances with Parramatta in the 2024 NRL season as the club finished a disappointing 15th on the table.

=== 2025 ===
Greig made no appearances for Parramatta in the 2025 NRL season. He would instead play for the clubs reserve grade side in the NSW Cup making 17 appearances. In early September, it was announced that Greig would be departing Parramatta after not being offered a new contract. He made a total of 27 first grade appearances for the club and played 61 games in the NSW Cup for Parramatta.

=== 2026 ===
Greig was given a lifeline by his NYC club North Queensland for the 2026 NRL season, who gave him an opportunity off the bench in his first top grade match in two years, North Queensland went onto win 18–12 over the Sydney Roosters.

On 15 October 2026 it was reported that he had signed for Leeds Rhinos in the Super League on a two-year contract.
