= Ben Condon =

Australian rugby league player

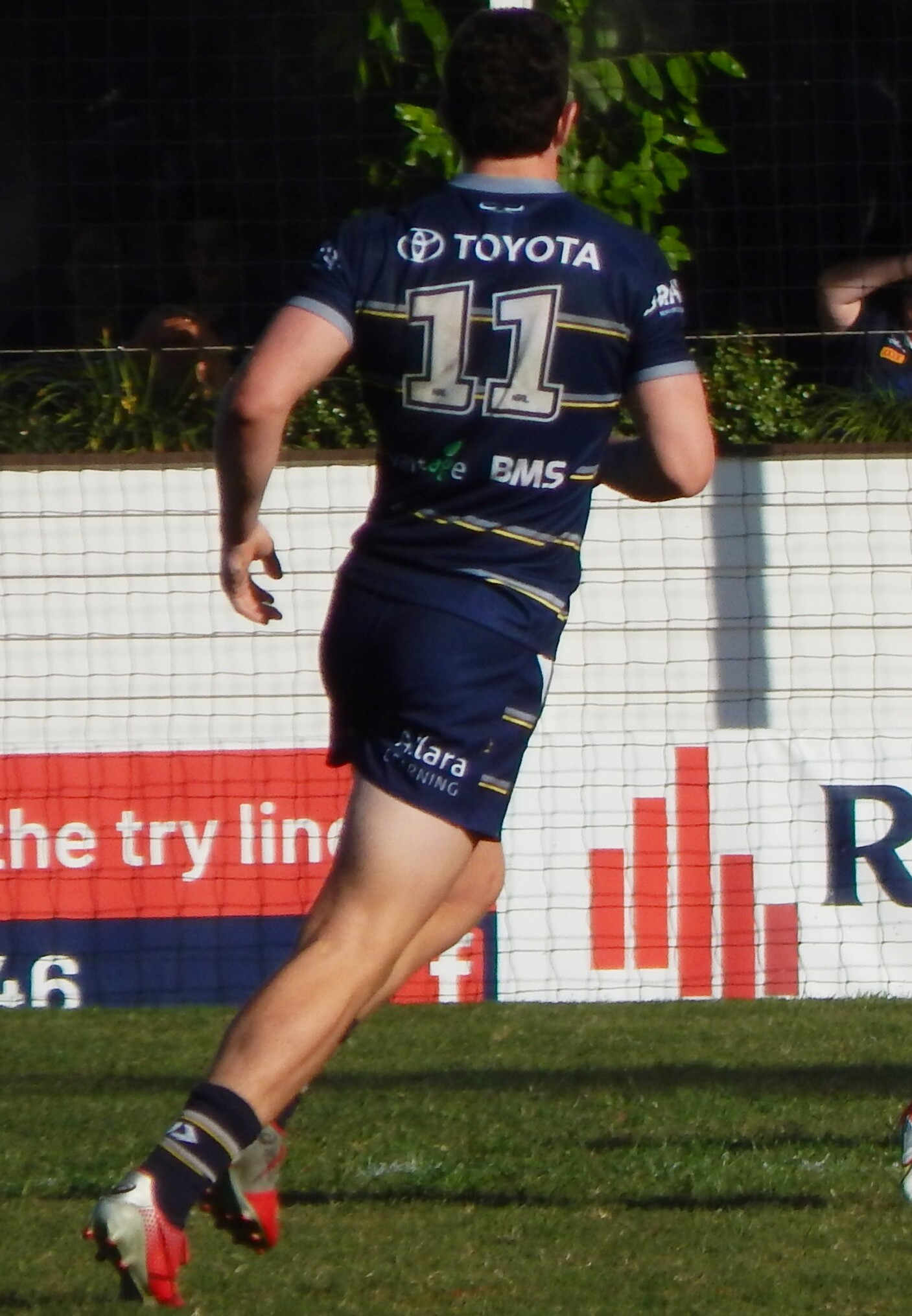

Personal information
- Full name: Benjamin Condon
- Born: 13 July 2000 (age 26) Roma, Queensland, Australia
- Height: 6 ft 5 in (1.96 m)
- Weight: 17 st 2 lb (109 kg)

Playing information
- Position: Prop, Second-row
Club
Years	Team	Pld	T	G	FG	P
2020–22	North Qld Cowboys	12	4	0	0	16
2023–24	Manly Sea Eagles	5	1	0	0	4
2025	Widnes Vikings	10	5	0	0	20
2026–	Catalans Dragons	26	4	0	0	16
	Total	53	14	0	0	56
- Source: As of 24 February 2026

Ben Condon (born 13 July 2000) is an Australian professional rugby league footballer who plays as a second-row forward for the Catalans Dragons in the Super League.

He previously played for the North Queensland Cowboys in the NRL.

== Background ==
Born in Roma, Queensland, Condon played his junior rugby league for the Wallumbilla-Surat Red Bulls.

He attended Rockhampton Grammar School before being signed by the North Queensland Cowboys in 2017.

== Playing career ==
=== Early career ===
In 2016, Condon played for the Central Queensland Capras Cyril Connell Cup team before moving up to their Mal Meninga Cup team in 2017. In 2018, Condon moved to Townsville, Queensland and joined the Townsville Blackhawks. After starting the year with the Mal Meninga Cup side, he later progressed to their Hastings Deering Colts team, scoring a try in their Grand Final loss to the Norths Devils.

In 2019, he spent the season with the Blackhawks' under-20 side and represented the Queensland under-20 team. On 24 September 2019, Condon signed a development contract with the North Queensland Cowboys, joining their NRL squad.

=== 2020 ===
In 2020, Condon started the season playing for the Northern Pride in the Queensland Cup. However the Queensland Cup competition was cancelled after just one round due to the COVID-19 pandemic.

Condon made his made his NRL debut for North Queensland in Round 19 of the 2020 NRL season, against Penrith.

=== 2021 & 2022 ===
Condon made 11 appearances for North Queensland in the 2021 NRL season as the club finished 15th on the table.

=== 2023 ===
On 19 October 2022, Condon signed a three-year deal to join Manly-Warringah starting in 2023. Condon was limited to just four games with Manly in the 2023 NRL season as the club finished 12th on the table and missed the finals.

=== 2024 ===
On 11 October 2024 it was announced that Condon had signed a 2-year deal for the Leigh Leopards in the Super League On 15 December it was announced that the deal fell through because Condon failed his medical.

=== 2025 ===
On 13 January, it was announced that Condon had signed on to play with the Central Queensland Capras in the QLD cup.

On 27 June 2025 it was reported that he had signed for Widnes Vikings in the RFL Championship for the remainder of the 2025 season.

On 14 October 2025 it was reported that he had signed for Catalans Dragons in the Super League for 2026 on a two-year deal

== Statistics ==
Statistics are correct to the end of 2025

Season	Team	Matches	T	G	GK %	F/G	Pts
2020	North Queensland Cowboys	1	0	0	—	0	0
2021	North Queensland Cowboys	11	4	0	—	0	16
2023	Manly Warringah Sea Eagles	4	1	0	—	0	4
2024	Manly Warringah Sea Eagles	1	0	0	—	0	0
2025	Widnes Vikings	10	5	0	0	0	20
2026	Catalans Dragons	0	0	0	0	0	0
Career totals		27	10	0	—	0	40
