= Joe Eichner =

United States international rugby league player

Personal information
- Full name: Joseph Michael Eichner
- Born: October 9, 1991 (age 35) Geneva, Florida, United States
- Height: 6 ft 2 in (188 cm)
- Weight: 220 lb (100 kg)

Playing information
- Position: Lock, Second-row
Club
| Years | Team | Pld | T | G | FG | P |
|---|---|---|---|---|---|---|
| 2015–17 | Jacksonville Axemen | 22 | 0 | 0 | 0 | 0 |
| 2017–18 | Underbank Rangers | 24 | 0 | 0 | 0 | 0 |
| 2019–21 | Northern Pride RLFC | 7 | 0 | 0 | 0 | 0 |
| 2021–23 | New York Freedom | 0 | 0 | 0 | 0 | 0 |
| 2024– | Tampa Mayhem | 20 | 5 | 0 | 0 | 0 |
| | Total | 73 | 5 | 0 | 0 | 0 |
Representative
| Years | Team | Pld | T | G | FG | P |
| 2016– | United States | 29 | 1 | 0 | 0 | 4 |
| 2019– | United States 9s | 2 | 0 | 0 | 0 | 0 |
- Source: As of November 3, 2026

Joseph Michael Eichner (born October 9, 1991) is an American rugby league player who played professionally for the Toronto Wolfpack during their inaugural season in League 1. Primarily playing as a second-row, Eichner is a United States international representative and was a member of their 2017 World Cup squad and 2019 9’s Rugby League World Cup squad. He currently plays for New York Freedom in the North American Rugby League where he was the first ever player signed by the newly formed club.

== Early life ==
A Geneva, Florida native, Eichner played baseball and attended Oviedo High School in his youth. He discovered rugby league in 2010 while attending the University of North Florida, and joined the Jacksonville Axemen of the USA Rugby League after graduating with his bachelor's degree in building science.

== Playing career ==
After attending a try-out in Tampa, Florida in October 2016, Eichner earned a contract with the Toronto Wolfpack in December 2016 following a twelve-day training camp held in Brighouse, West Yorkshire, England. He made his debut for the Wolfpack in their round 9 match against the Coventry Bears on June 3, 2017. On September 24, Eichner was named in the United States' 23-man squad for the 2017 World Cup. In 2018, Eichner joined the Junee Diesels in the Group 9 Rugby League, playing alongside fellow U.S. representative Tui Samoa.

In August 2019, Eichner made his debut for the Northern Pride in the Intrust Super Cup.
