= Northern Pride RLFC =

Australian rugby league club, based in Cairns, Queensland

Northern Pride

Club information
- Full name: Northern Pride Rugby League Football Club
- Nickname: The Pride
- Colours: Blue, Orange
- Founded: 2007; 19 years ago
- Website: northernpride.com.au

Current details
- Ground: Barlow Park, Cairns (seating 1,700, standing 15,000)
- CEO: Garreth Smith (2022-)
- Chairman: Terry Medhurst (2024-)
- Coach: Sam Williams (2026-)
- Manager: Sam Harreman
- Captain: Kyle Schneider (2024-)
- Competition: Queensland Cup; Mal Meninga Cup; Cyril Connell Cup; Harvey Norman U19; Harvey Norman U17; BMD Premiership (from 2025)
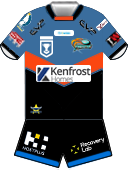
Home colours

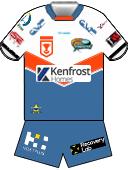
Away colours
- Current season

Records
- Premierships: 2 (2010, 2014)
- Runners-up: 1 (2009)
- Minor premierships: 3 (2013, 2014, 2024)
- Wooden spoons: 0

Queensland Cup
- Sport: Rugby league
- Inaugural season: 2008
- Number of teams: 15
- Country: Australia
- Premiers: Northern Pride (2024)
- Most titles: Redcliffe Dolphins (6 titles)
- Website: Queensland Cup
- Broadcast partner: Nine Network

Northern Pride Rugby League Football Club is a semi-professional Queensland rugby league club based in Cairns. Founded in 2007, they represent Far North Queensland, and compete in Queensland's top rugby league competition, QRL's Queensland Cup.

Since 2008, the club have been minor-premiers three times (2013, 2014 and 2024), and have appeared in ten finals series, reaching the Grand Final three times (runners-up in 2009 and winners in 2010 and 2014). In 2014 they won the NRL State Championship.

Along with the Mackay Cutters they are a feeder club to National Rugby League's North Queensland Cowboys.

== History ==
The Northern Pride was one of two expansion teams for the 2008 season of the QRL Wizard Queensland Cup, along with the Mackay Cutters, against whom they played their debut game.

Cairns was represented in the QRL State Competition from 1996 to 2000 by the Cairns Cyclones, but a lack of support resulted in their withdrawal.

Further representation in the competition was suggested in 2006 by a Cairns-based consortium of John O'Brien (owner of Pacific Toyota, Cairns), Denis Keeffe (chairman of Events Cairns and former CEO of the North Queensland Cowboys), Nigel Tillet (president of the CDRL) and John Moore (QRL Northern Division chairman), this time with the support of Peter Parr, CEO of the North Queensland Cowboys, and 9 of the 11 local CDRL clubs. Starter capital for the bid was provided by 40 local business people.

The team name and logo were unveiled in July 2007 at a 'Legends of Origin' lunch held at The Reef Hotel Casino. The Northern Pride bid was submitted to the QRL on 25 August 2007, and approved on 14 September 2007.

Northern Pride is a development club built around the phrase 'Born and Bred.' It was formed to create a regionally based talent development pathway for players, coaches and administrators. Prior to the creation of the club, talented Far North Queensland rugby league players were invariably forced to move away from the region to go to schools and/or join southern based state league and national league clubs. The Pride is a feeder club to the North Queensland Cowboys.

== Competitions ==
The Northern Pride first grade side competes in the QRL State competition, the Queensland Cup, which for sponsorship reasons is called the Hostplus Cup (2023-), formerly the Intrust Super Cup (2010–2022) and the Wizard Queensland Cup (2008–2009).

The club also fields academy teams in the Auswide Bank Mal Meninga Cup U18 (2009–), and Cyril Connell Challenge U16 (2021–), and women's teams in the Harvey Norman U19 (2020–), Harvey Norman U17 (2024–), and from 2025 the BMD Premiership.

The club played in the former Hastings Deering Colts U20 Competition (2018–2020), Hastings Deering Colts U21 Competition (2021–2023), QRL Junior State Championships (2017–2020), and Cyril Connell Cup U16 (2009–2016).

- Hostplus Cup (2023–)
- Auswide Bank Mal Meninga Cup U18 (2009–)
- Cyril Connell Challenge U16 (2021–)
- Harvey Norman U19 (2020–)
- Harvey Norman U17 (2024–)
- BMD Premiership (2025–)
- Wizard Queensland Cup (2008–2009)
- Intrust Super Cup (2010–2022)
- Hastings Deering Colts U20 (2018–2020)
- Hastings Deering Colts U21 (2021–2023)
- QRL Junior State Championships (2017–2020)
- Cyril Connell Cup U16 (2009–2016)

== Staff ==
=== Coach ===
The original coach was Adrian Lam, who arrived in Cairns in August 2007 during the bid process, but was released a month later to take up a coaching position at the Sydney Roosters. He was replaced by former NRL Canberra Raiders player Andrew Dunemann, with former North Queensland Cowboys player David Maiden, and Foley Shield coach Troy Cummings as Assistant Coaches. In their first year in the competition, the Pride finished in third place, and the following year they reached the Grand Final.

Dunemann resigned at the end of 2009 and Maiden was promoted to Head Coach with former Canberra Raiders and PNG international David Westley as Assistant Coach. In Maiden's first year, the Pride won the grand finals. Maido left at the end of 2012 season and was replaced by former Super League player Jason Demetriou as head coach with Ben Rauter as Assistant Coach.

Demetriou coached the Pride to a minor premiership in his first season, winning 17 of their 22 games and being awarded the 'Men of League Coach of the Year' award. In his second season he secured the minor premiership again, winning 20 games in 24 rounds, before taking out the premiership and the inaugural NRL State Championship. Demetriou resigned at the end of the 2014 season to further his career as a coach in the NRL. He was replaced by assistant coach Joe O'Callaghan, who coached the team during the 2015 and 2016 seasons with assistant coaches Shane O'Flanagan and Leon Hallie, and trainer Darren Ferricks.

Former North Queensland Cowboys and Queensland Origin winger Ty Williams was appointed coach in 2017, with assistant coaches Sam Obst and Shane O'Flanagan. Williams was named QRL 'Coach of the Year' for the 2018 season, and he signed several contract extensions which saw him coach until the end of the 2023 season.

Eric Smith was appointed coach for the 2024 season, with former Pride players Sam Obst and Will Bugden as assistant coaches. Smith coached the side to the minor-premiership, before resigning to coach at the Redcliffe Dolphins. He was replaced for the 2025 season by Russ Aitken. After a poor 2025 season, Aitken was removed as coach with former Canberra Raiders player Sam Williams announced to take over as coach for the 2026-27 seasons. Cameron 'Spiller' Miller was Assistant Coach and Ian Blake was Head of Performance.

- Adrian Lam (2007)
- Andrew Dunemann (2008–2009)
- David Maiden (2010–2012)
- Jason Demetriou (2013–2014)
- Joe O'Callaghan (2015–2016)
- Ty Williams (2017–2023)
- Eric Smith (2024)
- Russ Aitken (2025)
- Sam Williams (2026-)

==== Football Operations Managers ====
- Chey Bird (2018–2020)
- Cameron Miller (2021)
- Tanya Tully (2022– )

==== Team Managers ====
- Rob White (2008–2014)
- Alan Marsh (2015–2016)
- ? (2017–2019)
- Terry Osmond (2020–2023)
- Sam Harreman (2024)
- Brendon Alexander (2025)
- Jackson Nicolau (2026- )

=== Captain ===
The foundation captain of the Northern Pride was former North Queensland Cowboys and St. George Illawarra Dragons player Chris Sheppard. He was the first player signed to the team in July 2007, and was captain and operations manager for the first three seasons. Sheppard retired after leading the Pride to the 2010 Queensland Cup premiership.

Former North Queensland Cowboys player Ty Williams was captain for the next three seasons (2011–2013), before retiring to captain-coach the CDRL Innisfail Leprechauns. In 2014 Brett Anderson and Jason Roos were named as joint co-captains.

Ryan Ghietti was named as captain in 2016, with Jack Svendsen as vice-captain. Ghietti retired at the end of the 2018 season and Tom Hancock and Dave Murphy were named as joint co-captains for the 2019 season. Javid Bowen was named captain for the 2020 Season, but only one round was played before the season was cancelled due to COVID-19.

When matches restarted in 2021, Bowen re-signed with the Cowboys and Chris Ostwald and Jayden Hodges were named co-captains. Hodges left at the end of the 2022 season, and Ostwald was named captain for the 2023 season, with Ewan Moore as vice-captain. Newly signed hooker, Kyle Schneider was appointed captain for the 2024 season, with Ewan Moore and Evan Child as joint vice-captains.

For the 2025 season, prop Nick Lui-Toso was appointed captain, with Kenneth Fonoti and Campbell Duffy also serving as captains during the season.

Prop Kenneth Fonoti was appointed captain for the 2026 season under new head coach Sam Williams.

When the team captain has been unavailable due to injury or representative duties, they have been replaced by other team members, including Chey Bird, Ben Laity and Mark Cantoni. Other players have been named as captain for pre-season trials, including Warren Jensen, Ryan Stig, Sheldon Powe-Hobbs, Jordan Biondi-Odo and Tom Hancock.

- Chris Sheppard (2008–2010)
- Ty Williams (2011–2013)
- Brett Anderson and Jason Roos (2014–2015)
- Ryan Ghietti (2016–2018)
- Tom Hancock & Dave Murphy (2018–2019)
- Javid Bowen (2020)
- Chris Ostwald & Jayden Hodges (2021–2022)
- Chris Ostwald (2023)
- Kyle Schneider (2024)
- Nick Lui-Toso (2025)
- Kenneth Fonoti (2026–)

=== CEO ===
The foundation Chief Executive Officer was Dennis Keeffe (former CEO of the North Queensland Cowboys), who held the position from 2007 to 2009. He was replaced in 2010 by QRL Northern Division chairman John Moore. From 2011 to 2013 former team captain Chris Sheppard was chief executive officer. In 2013–2014 Northern Pride business development manager, Brock Schaefer was CEO. Schaefer resigned at the end of the 2014 season to take up a role at South Sydney Rabbitohs, and was replaced by former Pride player Rod Jensen for the 2015 and 2016 seasons. Greg Dowling was CEO for the 2017 season, but resigned half-way through the 2018 season. He was replaced by Mark Quinn, who resigned at the end of the 2020 season. Paul Callaghan was CEO for the 2021 season, with Garreth Smith taking up the role in 2022.

- Dennis Keeffe (2007–2009)
- John Moore (2010)
- Chris Sheppard (2011–2012)
- Brock Schaefer (2013–2014)
- Rod Jensen (2015–2016)
- Greg Dowling (2017–2018)
- Mark Quinn (2018–2020)
- Paul Callaghan (2021)
- Garreth Smith (2022– )

=== Chairman and Board of Directors ===
The founding Northern Pride chairman was John O'Brien. He was replaced at the end of 2008 by Bob Fowler, who retired in December 2015. Terry Mackenroth acted as interim chairman until June 2016, when Cairns real-estate agent and club director, Tony Williamson, was appointed chairman. Williamson resigned at the end of the 2020 season, with Nigel Tillett acting as interim chairman until Terry Medhurst was appointed chairman at the start of the 2024 season.

The Northern Pride Board of Directors for the 2026 season is Kym McPhee-Smith (chair), Joel Riethmuller (player representative), Dean Payne (North Queensland Cowboys representative), Mark Whitnall, Stephen Devenish, Andrew Leith, Alannah Giuffrida and Brett Maloney-Carter.

- John O'Brien (2007–2008)
- Bob Fowler (2009–2015)
- Terry Mackenroth (2016)
- Tony Williamson (2016–2020)
- Nigel Tillett (2021–2023)
- Terry Medhurst (2024)
- Kym McPhee-Smith (2025– )

==== Life members ====
There have been six life members. The first three life memberships were awarded at a Round 22 pre-game luncheon at Barlow Park, 7 August 2016. John O'Brien and John Moore were founding board members of the Northern Pride and its predecessor the Cairns Cyclones, and Bob Fowler was Chairman of the Pride from 2009-2016. Nigel Tillett served as chairman at the Northern Pride for three years. Christine and Richard Muirhead were inducted as Life Members of the Northern Pride rugby league club at the club's presentation night in September 2025 as the club's ultimate super-fans.

- John O'Brien AM (1950-2025)
- John Moore (1938-2025)
- Bob Fowler
- Nigel Tillett
- Richard Muirhead
- Christine Muirhead

== Venues ==
=== Barlow Park ===
Barlow Park
- Interactive map of Barlow Park
- Coordinates: 16°55′49″S 145°46′2″E
- Owner: Cairns Regional Council
- Surface: grass

Construction
- Opened: 1987
- Closed: 2032?
- Demolished: 2026

The Pride's home ground is Barlow Park, corner Scott & Severin St, Parramatta Park, in Cairns.

Barlow Park was opened in 1987 with a playing field 114 metres long (100 metres of field plus two 7-metre in-goal areas) by 68 metres wide. The 1987 grandstand was extended in 2003, giving a capacity of 15,000, which includes 1,700 seats (mostly undercover) in a stand on the northern side of the park. The facility was floodlit for night games with four towers providing 620 lux. The car park accommodated approximately 300 vehicles.

In 2012–2013 the Pride played 13 consecutive home games at Barlow Park without loss. In 2014 Barlow Park was renamed 'The Jungle' and the Pride won all 12 matches they played there.

Barlow Park is scheduled for a multi-million dollar redevelopment led by Architectus, HKS, and Indij Design to prepare for the 2032 Brisbane Olympic and Paralympic football preliminaries. Permanent seating capacity will increase from 1,700 to 5,000 (reaching up to 20,000 during the Games with temporary seating). In 2024 a $10.9 million project installed four LED towers which increased the lighting capacity to broadcast standard of 1800 lux, and also installed a large video screen for scoring and replays. Further upgrades are proposed to enable the venue to be used for preliminary soccer matches in the lead up to the 2032 Olympic games, with the 1987 grandstand due to be demolished at the end of 2026.

During the 2026-2028 Barlow Park redevelopment, the Pride will play their home games at the redeveloped FNQRL Cairns Brothers Stadium at Stan Williams Park, Manunda.

==== Other venues ====
When Barlow Park was unavailable due to renovations, maintenance and conflicts with other events, the Pride played at nearby venues. They played three home games at CDRL Kangaroos' Vico Oval (two in 2010 and one in 2019), one home game at CDJRL Jones Park in 2018, and two home games at CDRL Brothers Cairns Stan Williams Park in 2018.

Inclement weather resulted in a change of venue in Round 7 2014, when the Pride home game against Easts Tigers was postponed by Cyclone Ita and later played at Davies Park, Mareeba, and Round 1 2018, when heavy rain closed Barlow Park, so the Pride's home game against Wynnum Manly Seagulls was played at Langlands Park, Brisbane.

The Pride have relocated home games to regional venues: Davies Park, Mareeba (2014); Atherton Stadium (2016 against Burleigh Bears, and 2018 against Townsville Blackhawks); Callendar Park, Innisfail (2022 against Wynnum Manly Seagulls); Tully Showgrounds (2023 against Sunshine Coast Falcons); and Queensland Country Bank Stadium, Townsville (2024 against Souths Logan Magpies).

==== Country Week ====
As part of the QRL's 'Country Week' initiative, the Northern Pride have played at Alec Inch Oval, Mount Isa (2012); Jilara Oval, Yarrabah (2013 and 2025); Davies Park, Mareeba (2014); Callendar Park, Innisfail (2015 and 2026); Ravenshoe JRL Grounds (2016); Yusia Ginau Oval, Bamaga (2017); John Street Oval, Cooktown (2018 and 2024); Ken Brown Oval, Thursday Island (2019 and 2022), Atherton Stadium (2021); and Andoom Oval, Weipa (2023).

==== Pride Oval and Leagues Club ====
Vico Oval
- Interactive map of Vico Oval
- Coordinates: 16°55′43″S 145°43′51″E

The Pride purchased CDRL Kangaroos Leagues Club and Vico Oval, Irene Street, Mooroobool from the Redcliffe Dolphins in June 2008 for $1.85m (the Dolphins having purchased the Oval and Leagues Club from the Kangaroos in 2005 when the Roos were in financial difficulty). Vico Oval was renamed Pride Oval and the 2008 Northern Pride Player Awards ceremony was held at the Pride Leagues Club. Pre-season trials were played at Pride Oval in 2009, as well as rounds 9 and 11 of the 2010 season.

The Oval and Leagues Club cost around $230,000 a year to maintain, and so in December 2010 Cairns Regional Council agreed to purchase the sporting complex for $2.5m to guarantee its future as a sporting field, prevent residential development on the land and free the Northern Pride rugby league club from an oppressive debt. The Pride were given a six-month lease, and when it expired in May 2011 they decided not to renew and moved to Barlow Park. Pride Oval was leased to CDRL Kangaroos RLFC and became Vico Oval and Kangaroos Leagues Club once again. The Pride played pre-season trial matches at Vico Oval in 2012 and 2016.

== Seasons ==
=== 2008 – Inaugural Season – Preliminary Finalists ===
In their first year in the Queensland Cup the Northern Pride came third, losing the preliminary final in golden point extra-time to the Souths Logan Magpies, who went on to win the 2008 grand final. The foundation coach was Andrew Dunemann, who had played first-grade in both the NRL and English Super League. The assistant coach was David Maiden, a rugby league international who had played in the NRL, English Super League, and Queensland Cup. The foundation captain was Chris Sheppard, who had played for the North Queensland Cowboys and St. George Illawarra Dragons.

=== 2009 – Runners Up ===
The Northern Pride followed up their impressive first season by finishing second and reaching the grand final. The Pride's first grand final appearance ended in a 32–18 loss to the Sunshine Coast Sea Eagles at Stockland Park. Coach Andrew Dunemann left at the end of the season to take up a position as assistant coach to Rick Stone at the Newcastle Knights.

=== 2010 – Premiers ===
David Maiden took over as coach. Maiden played for the North Queensland Cowboys, Gateshead Thunder and Hull FC, as well as representing Scotland as an international in the 2000 Rugby League World Cup. The Northern Pride finished fourth and made the Grand Final, having won 11 matches in a row. They won their first premiership, beating Norths Devils 30–20 at Suncorp Stadium. Captain Chris Sheppard won the Duncan Hall Medal for his man-of-the-match performance, which was his last game before retirement.

=== 2011 – Semi-finalists ===
The new captain was recently retired North Queensland Cowboys wing Ty Williams. Between Round 14 of the 2010 season and Round 5 of the 2011 season, the Northern Pride won 17 consecutive games, a Queensland Cup record. After a draw in Round 6 and a win in Round 7, the Pride were unbeaten after 19 matches. The Pride finished the 2011 season in second place, but were eliminated after losing the semi-final 26-20 to Tweed Heads Seagulls at Dolphin Oval, Redcliffe.

=== 2012 season ===
In 2012, the club finished seventh to miss out on a finals appearance for the first time in their short history. At the end of the season, coach David Maiden resigned, while fullback Chey Bird, who scored 572 points in 94 appearances for the Pride, retired along with former North Queensland Cowboys star Rod Jensen, who scored 36 tries in 69 games for the club, second on the Pride's all-time try scorer list.

=== 2013 – Minor Premiers ===
Former Super League player Jason Demetriou replaced David Maiden as coach, and Brock Schaefer replaced Chris Sheppard as CEO. The Pride finished first and won their first minor premiership. Head Coach Jason Demetriou was awarded the Men of League Coach of the Year. The Pride lost the major semi-final and the preliminary final, and missed out on a Grand Final appearance. At the end of the season Captain Ty Williams retired.

=== 2014 – Minor Premiers, Premiers and NRL State Champions ===
Coach Jason Demetriou named Brett Anderson and Jason Roos as joint co-captains. Barlow Park was renamed 'The Jungle' and the Pride introduced a new mascot, Barlow the lion. The Pride won 20 of their 24 games (including all 11 home games at Barlow Park) and they took out the minor premiership for the second year in a row. The Pride won the grand final 36–4 against Easts Tigers and won the inaugural NRL State Championship against the New South Wales Cup premiers, Penrith Panthers. At the end of the season four of the Pride's players were offered NRL contracts and Demetriou left to take up the role of assistant coach at the North Queensland Cowboys.

=== 2015 – Elimination Finals ===
The Northern Pride defended their premiership under new coach Joe O'Callaghan. This was the inaugural season of the Townsville Blackhawks in the Queensland Cup, who became the third feeder club of the North Queensland Cowboys. The Pride were eliminated 54–26 in the first week of the finals by the Ipswich Jets, who would go on to win the Queensland Cup. The Pride got off to a poor start, losing the first four rounds, but then began to string some wins together, climbing into the top eight by Round 9. They won 14 games this season, and finished in sixth place, but were eliminated in the first week of the finals, losing 26–54 to the Ipswich Jets, who would go on to win the Grand Final against the new Townsville side.

=== 2016 season ===
The Pride lost a wealth of talent to retirement at the end of last season. In 2016 they fielded the youngest team so far, with an average age of 21. While the Pride had some memorable wins, they lost more home games than they won and finished eighth, missing out on the finals series for just the second time. At the end of the season coach Joe O'Callaghan resigned.

=== 2017 season ===
Ty Williams succeeded Joe O'Callaghan as coach. The Pride struggled this year, winning only six games, and losing seventeen, including eight losses in a row from Round 11 to Round 19. The Pride, who previously had an unenviable record of wins at home, managed only two victories at Barlow Park. They finished in twelfth place, their worst season to date.

=== 2018 – Elimination Finals ===
In their second year under coach Ty Williams the Pride won 13 games, an improvement on last year. They finished fourth and qualified for the finals, the first time since 2015. However they were eliminated in the first week of the finals by Easts Tigers. This game was played at Stan Williams Park, the home of Cairns Brothers, as Barlow Park was unavailable.

=== 2019 season ===
The Pride's 2019 season was disappointing. While they started the season well, winning their first two games against tough opponents, they went on to lose the next 10 straight, a club record, and finished in twelfth place with just five wins from 23 games. They managed to finish the season in a competitive fashion, pulling off a thrilling comeback to defeat Easts Tigers 18-16 in their last home game, before narrowly falling to Tweed Seagulls 12-10 in the final round.

=== 2020 season ===
The season was cancelled after one round due to the COVID-19 pandemic. The Pride played three pre-season trials, two of which attracted large crowds - the trial against the Blackhawks was a curtain-raiser to the Cowboys v Broncos pre-season trial, and the trial against the Hunters attracted a large ex-pat following. The only match in the regular season was an away game where the Pride lost to Tweed Heads Seagulls. In August and September a special four-team 'Lightning Challenge' competition was held to give the players and fans some rugby league in what was otherwise a very quiet year.

=== 2021 season ===
The 2021 Intrust Super Cup was played over 19 rounds. The Northern Pride finished ninth and missed out playing in the finals.

=== 2022 – Elimination Finals ===
The 2022 Hostplus Cup saw fourteen teams playing 20 rounds. The Northern Pride finished 8th and were knocked out of the finals series in week one, losing 30-22 to the Central Queensland Capras.

=== 2023 – Elimination Finals ===
The 2023 Hostplus Cup was played over 22 rounds. The Northern Pride finished in seventh place, but were knocked out of the finals series in week one, losing 15-14 to Wynnum Manly Seagulls. Coach Ty Williams retired at the end of the season.

=== 2024 – Minor Premiers ===
Eric Smith was appointed as coach. New signings included Lachlan West, Nat McGavin and Bacho Salam from the Brisbane Tigers, Dane Aukafolau (Newcastle Knights), Jensen Taumoepeau (Newtown Jets), Kyle Schneider (Mackay Cutters), Josh Allen (Canberra Raiders) and Ashton Galea (Innisfail Brothers).

The Pride finished on top of the table as Minor Premiers, winning 17 of their 20 matches, including all of their home games, scoring 660 points and conceding 308 for a points differential of +352. They went undefeated from Round 9 onwards and finished the regular season with 10 wins from 10 matches at Barlow Park. In the finals series, the Pride defeated the Sunshine Coast Falcons 38–0 in the qualifying final, but lost their home Preliminary Final 16–17 (after golden point extra time) to the Redcliffe Dolphins. Thomas Duffy was the team's top point-scorer with 142 points (3 tries, 65 goals), while Dane Aukafolau and Jensen Taumoepeau were joint top try-scorers with 10 tries each. Coach Smith resigned at the end of the season to coach the Redcliffe Dolphins.

=== 2025 season ===
Russ Aitken was appointed as coach, replacing Eric Smith who departed for the Redcliffe Dolphins. Prop Nick Lui-Toso was appointed captain, with Kyle Schneider following Smith to Redcliffe. The Pride had a disappointing season, finishing 14th on the ladder with only 5 wins from 20 matches, winning 368 points and conceding 405. Dane Aukafolau was the top try-scorer with 11 tries, while Thomas Duffy remained the top point-scorer with 56 points. Aitken stepped away from his role as Head Coach at the end of the season.

=== 2026 season ===
The 2026 Hostplus Cup is the 31st season of Queensland's top-level statewide rugby league competition run by the Queensland Rugby League. Fifteen teams play over 23 rounds between March and August, with the finals series played in September. Former Canberra Raiders halfback Sam Williams was announced as the new head coach for the 2026–27 seasons, replacing Russ Aitken. Williams had previously coached the Queanbeyan Roos to 3 Minor Premierships and 2 Premierships. Prop Kenneth Fonoti was appointed captain for the 2026 season.

The Pride launched their 2026 campaign in February with a trial match against the PNG Hunters at Stan Williams Park.

As of August 2026, the Pride are tenth on the Hostplus Cup ladder after recording mixed results. Top performers include Jack Boyling (leading tackler with 713 tackles), Zac Herdegen (leading point-scorer with 94 points), and Ronald Philitoga (leading try-scorer with 18 tries).

Northern Pride 2025 Squad
First team squad			Coaching staff
(c) – HK; (vc) – SR; (vc) – LK; – FB; – WG; – WG; – CE; – CE; – HB; – FB	– PR; – SR; – PR; – HK; – PR; – WG; – SR; – HB; – HK; – LK	– HB; – HK; – PR; – SR; – SR; – CE; – FB; – PR; – LK; – FB	Head coach: Russ Aitken (Head Coach); Assistant coaches: (Assistant Coach); (Assistant Coach); (Strength & Conditioning); Legend: (c) Captain(s); (vc) Vice-captain(s); Updated: 13 March 2024; Source(s):

==== North Queensland Cowboys allocated players ====
The Cowboys split their squad of NRL and development list players between their two feeder clubs, the Pride and Mackay Cutters, with players not required for that weekend's NRL fixture heading to their Queensland Cup team.

Cowboys allocated to the Pride in 2025

- Braidon Burns – CE
- Emarly Bitungane – PR
- Harrison Edwards – LK, SR
- Henry Teutau* – PR
- Jack Gosiewski – SR
- Jake Clifford – FE
- Jodeci Baker-Tiraha – CE
- Kaiden Lahrs – PR
- Mason Kira* – SR
- Robert Derby* – WG
- Tom Chester – FB
- Tom Duffy – HB

==== 2025 Ladder ====
Position	2025	P	W	D	L	B	For	Against	Diff	Points
x	Northern Pride	x	x	x	x	x	x	x	x	x

== Team of the Decade, 2008–2017 ==
In 2017, to mark the ten-year anniversary of the Northern Pride, a 'Team of the Decade' was selected. Eligible players had to have played 30 matches for the Pride. The selection panel was Brett Allen, Rhys O'Neill, Pat Bailey, Greg Dowling, Rob White and Bob Fowler. The Team was announced at a Gala Anniversary Dinner on 30 June 2017.

== Club records ==
- Most appearances: Jason Roos, 163 (2008–2015).
- Most points scored for the club: Chey Bird, 574 points (23 tries, 226 goals).
- Most points scored in a season: Chey Bird, 216 points (5 tries, 97 goals) 2011 season; Khan Ahwang 206 points in 23 games in the 2016 season (13 tries, 76 goals).
- Most points in a game: Tom Humble 34 points (4 tries, 9 goals) against Redcliffe in Round 18, 2009.
- Most tries scored for the club: Brett Anderson, 61 tries.
- Most tries scored in a season: Linc Port, 26 tries in 25 games in the 2015 season.
- Most tries in a game: 4 tries each by Brett Anderson (2008 v Mackay and again in 2011 v Easts); Tom Humble (2009 v Redcliffe); Linc Port (2015 v Capras).
- Most goals for the club: Chey Bird, 226 goals.
- Most goals in a season: Chey Bird, 97 goals, 2011 season.
- Most field-goals: Chris Sheppard, 3 field-goals.

== Jerseys ==
Northern Pride primary jerseys

2008

2009

2010

2011

2012

2013

2014

2015

2016

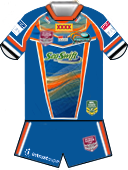
2017

2018

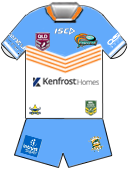
2020

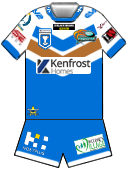
2023

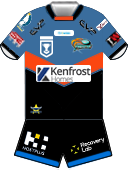
2024
Northern Pride alternative jerseys

2008

2009

2010

2011

2012

2013

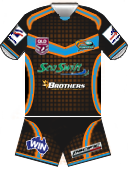
2014

2015

2016

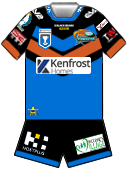
2023

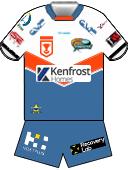
2024
Northern Pride special jerseys

2010 NAIDOC

2011 NAIDOC

2011 NPA

2012 Mt Isa

=== Special playing strips ===
- 2010: NAIDOC Week black jersey designed by Kevin Edmondston (Aboriginal) and Joey Laifoo (Torres Strait Islander) and worn in Round 16, Friday 9 July 2010 at Barlow Park for the game against the Ipswich Jets.
- 2011: NAIDOC Week green jersey worn in Round 15, Friday 8 July 2011 at Barlow Park for the game against the Burleigh Bears.
- 2011: Special Northern Peninsula Area (NPA) Indigenous jersey designed by Mario Assan for the Round 20 game played on Saturday 20 August 2011 at Yusia Ginau Oval, Bamaga, Queensland against Souths Logan Magpies. The design incorporates:

The five communities of the NPA Region: Injinoo, Umagico, Bamaga, New Mapoon and Seisia, the communities are represented on the five dots on the boomerang.
The five tribes the traditional owners of the NPA Anggamuthi, Atambaya, Wuthati, Yadhaykenu and Gudang. The tribes are depicted through the five rivers that stream from the bottom of the boomerang.
The main centrepiece of the design the Torres Strait Headress (Dhari) traditionally known as a Dhibal, is from Saibai Island, which makes up the majority of the TSI population in the NPA which migrated to the NPA throughout the 1940s. The Dhari as a significant importance in TSI culture, the initiation of young men into warriors, celebrated through dance and ceremonies.
The boomerang represents the Aboriginal peoples of the NPA, used in hunting and gathering and significant ceremonies.

- 2012: Pink socks and pink bootlaces for the Breast Cancer Foundation and Women in League Round, Round 15 played on Saturday 23 June 2012 at Barlow Park against Tweed Heads Seagulls.
- 2012: Orange jersey for the Round 17 game played on Saturday 14 July 2012 at Alec Inch Oval, Mt Isa against Souths Logan Magpies.

=== Sponsors ===
==== Naming rights sponsor ====
- 2008–2013: CRGT / Skill360
- 2014–2017: Sea Swift
- 2018–2019: Mount Peter (Kenfrost Homes) (The Pride started the 2018 season without a major sponsor)
- 2020– : Kenfrost Homes

==== Other sponsors ====
- Jersey sponsor: Sea Swift, Brothers Leagues Club, Queensland Country Credit Union.
- Sleeve sponsor: NQ X-Ray (2008–2010), Skytrans (2011–2014), Rivers Insurance Brokers (2015), Rivers Insurance Brokers & LJ Hooker (2016)
- Shorts sponsor: Brothers Leagues Club, Cairns Regional Council, Fuller Sports, Intrust Super, Cairns Hardware.
- Playing strip manufacturer: EMU Sportswear
- Other sponsors: XXXX; Gilligans Backpacker Hotel and Resort; Pacific Toyota; Cairns District Rugby League; Calanna Pharmacy; Tropic Wings; GATA Plastering; All Seasons Cairns Colonial Club; Cairns Plan Printing; Yalumba Winery.

==== Media partners ====
- Sea FM; Zinc 102.7; Triple M; WIN Television; Cairns Post.

== Players ==
=== Northern Pride players (2008-2023) ===
Player	Pride Heritage No.	Appearances	First Game	Seasons	Positions	Tries	Goals	FG	Pts
Adam Mills	25	16	2008, Round 6	2008–2009	Prop	3	0	0	12
Aidan Day	61	40	2011, Round 22	2011, 2016–2019	valign="top"| Lock, Second-row, interchange	1	0	0	4
Aiden Smith	87	14	2013, Round 1	2013	Halfback, Five-eighth	1	0	0	4
Aisea Namoa	62	3	2010, Round 19	2010	Wing, Centre	0	0	0	0
Akeripa Tia-Kilifi	124	4	2016, Round 1	2016	Second-row, Lock, interchange	0	0	0	0
Alex Starmer	16	120	2008, Round 1	2008–2015	Prop	6	0	0	24
Ash Little	190	33	2022, Round 1	2022–	Lock, Prop, Second-row, interchange	8	0	0	32
Bacho Salam	218	x	2024, Round 1	2024	Wing, Centre	x	x	x	x
Ben Fitzpatrick	48	12	2010, Round 1	2010–2012	Fullback	1	0	0	4
Ben Jeffries	107	1	2014, Round 22	2014	Centre, Wing	0	0	0	0
Ben Kerr	27	9	2008, Round 10	2008	Second-row, Prop, interchange	0	0	0	0
Ben Laity	8	117	2008, Round 1	2008–2013	Centre, Wing	10	0	0	40
Benjamin Reuter	XXX	5	2016, Round 16	2016	Halfback, Five-eighth, Centre	0	0	0	0
Bernard Lewis	170	44	2020, Round 1	2020–2023	Second-row, Lock, interchange	9	0	0	36
Brad Lupi	143	2	2017, Round 24	2017, 2020	Wing, Centre	0	0	0	0
Bradley Stephen	117	19	2015, Round 2	2015, 2017–2018	Centre, Wing	9	2	0	40
Brayden Torpy	123	35	2016, Round 1	2016, 2019	Fullback, Wing, Centre, interchange	2	15	1	39
Brendan Frei	196	5	2022, Round 11	2022	Centre, Wing	3	0	0	12
Brent Oosen	83	20	2012, Round 17	2012–2015	Second-row, Lock	0	0	0	0
Brenton Bowen	50	9	2010, Round 1	2010	Second-row, Lock	1	1	0	6
Brett Anderson	4	152	2008, Round 1	2008, 2010–2015, 2018	Prop, Second-row	77	0	0	308
Callan Myles	35	4	2008, Finals Week 1	2008–2009	Five-eighth, Halfback	0	0	0	0
Cameron Torpy	155	10	2019, Round 1	2019	interchange, Hooker, Lock, Second-row	1	0	0	4
Cephas Chinfat	165	13	2019, Round 15	2019–2021	Second-row, interchange	4	0	0	16
Chey Bird	2	96	2008, Round 1	2008–2012	Lock, Second-row	23	235	0	562
Chris Afamasaga	30	8	2008, Round 11	2008	interchange, Prop, Lock	1	0	0	4
Chris Ostwald	172	51	2020, Round 1	2020–	Wing, Halfback, Fullback, interchange	6	6	6	42
Chris Riesen	40	6	2009, Round 1	2010	Five-eighth, Centre, interchange, Halfback	1	0	0	4
Chris Sheppard	1	60	2008, Round 1	2008–2010	interchange, Prop	5	6	3	35
Codey Kennedy	115	1	2015, Round 6	2015	Centre, Wing	0	0	0	0
Colin Wilkie	125	42	2016, Round 5	2016–2018	interchange, Lock	8	0	0	32
Connor Jones	133	46	2017, Round 1	2017–2019	Fullback, Wing	7	0	0	28
Dane Aukafolau	223	x	2024, Round 3	2024	Centre, Wing	xz	x	x	x
Dane Hogan	54	2	2010, Round 2	2010	Five-eighth, Centre, Lock, Halfback, interchange, Fullback	1	0	0	4
Daniel Hindmarsh-Takyi	205	21	2023, Round 2	2023	Second-row, interchange, Prop	2	0	0	8
Daniel Woodhouse	199	16	2023, Round 2	2023–	Centre, Wing, interchange	4	0	0	16
Dantoray Lui	210	12	2023, Round 5	2023–	Prop, Second-row, interchange	3	0	0	12
Darryn Schonig	134	43	2017, Round 1	2017–2018	Centre, Wing	5	0	0	20
David Murphy	114	85	2015, Round 4	2015–2016, 2018, 2019	Second-row, Lock, Centre, Hooker	5	0	0	20
Davin Crampton	70	75	2011, Round 7	2011–2014	Second-row, Lock	45	0	0	180
Dean McGilvray	116	4	2015, Round 7	2015	Centre, Wing	1	0	0	4
Denzel King	119	29	2015, Round 11	2015–2016, 2019, 2021–	interchange, Hooker, Halfback	3	0	0	12
Dominic Biondi	160	3	2019, Round 5	2019	interchange, Second-row, Prop	1	0	0	4
Drew Campbell	22	22	2008, Round 4	2008–2010	interchange, Prop	8	0	0	32
Eddie 'Mareko' Daniels	198	1	2022, Round 16	2022	Halfback, Hooker, Five-eighth, interchange	1	0	0	4
Eric Warria	34	1	2008, Round 19	2008	Fullback, Wing, Five-eighth, interchange	0	0	0	0
Evan Child	162	59	2019, Round 8	2019, 2021–	interchange	17	0	0	68
Ewan Moore	163	59	2019, Round 9	2019, 2021–	Fullback, Halfback	17	0	0	68
Feao Tongia	207	18	2023, Round 2	2023	Prop	2	0	0	8
Frederick Koraba	127	2	2016, Round 8	2016	Prop, Second-row, interchange	0	0	0	0
Germaine Paulson	41	18	2009, Round 1	2009	Second-row, Lock	7	0	0	28
Gordon Rattler	3	11	2008, Round 1	2008–2009	Hooker, Prop, Five-eighth	3	0	0	12
Graham Clark	111	69	2015, Round 1	2015, 2017–2018	Prop, Second-row	8	0	0	32
Grant Anderson	181	15	2021, Round 3	2021	Fullback	9	9	0	54
Greg Byrnes	17	36	2008, Round 1	2008–2009	Hooker, interchange, Halfback	7	0	0	28
Greg Miglio	139	2	2016, Round 18	2016	Prop, interchange	2	0	0	8
Harry Freebairn	202	17	2023, Round 2	2023	Centre	0	0	0	0
Hugh Sedger	154	8	2019, Round 1	2019	Five-eighth, interchange, Hooker, Halfback, Fullback, Lock	0	0	0	0
Jack Brock	140	7	2017, Round 11	2017	interchange	0	0	0	0
Jack Campagnolo	142	28	2017, Round 22	2017–2020	Prop	5	27	0	74
Jack Cooper	66	6	2011, Round 1	2011	Prop	0	0	0	0
Jack Gosiewski	221	x	2024, Round 1	2024	Second-row				0
Jack Murphy	144	27	2018, Round 1	2018–2019	Fullback, Halfback	2	0	0	8
Jack Svendsen	102	57	2014, Round 8	2014–2016	Centre, Wing	9	0	0	36
Jacob Wallace	197	0	2022, Round 13	2022	interchange, Lock	0	0	0	0
Jahoiyakim Afoa	193	3	2022, Round 3	2022	interchange, Second-row, Lock, Prop, Wing, Centre	0	0	0	0
Jaiman Lowe	52	11	2010, Round 1	2010	Wing, Fullback, Centre	2	0	0	8
Jamayne Taunoa-Brown	195	2	2022, Round 5	2022	Hooker	0	0	0	0
James Clark	150	4	2018, Round 7	2018	Fullback	0	0	0	0
Jamie Frizzo	29	48	2008, Round 11	2008–2010, 2012	Prop, Second-row	18	0	0	72
Jared Allen	103	64	2014, Round 11	2014, 2016–2017, 2019	Fullback, Wing	7	0	0	28
Jason Roos	9	214	2008, Round 1	2008–2015	Wing, Centre, interchange	17	0	0	68
Jay Aston	53	11	2010, Round 2	2010	Centre, Wing	0	0	0	0
Jayden Corrigan	176	11	2021, Round 1	2021	interchange	6	0	0	24
Jayden Hodges	178	25	2021, Round 1	2021–2022	Lock	4	0	0	16
Jaymon Moore	203	21	2023, Round 2	2023	Wing	6	0	0	24
Jenson Taumoepeau	215	x	2024, Round 1	2024	Wing, interchange	x	x	x	x
Jodeci Tiraha-Baker	222	x	2024, Round 2	2024	Halfback, interchange, Hooker	x	x	x	x
Joe Eichner	168	4	2019, Round 21	2019–2020	Wing, Fullback, interchange	0	0	0	0
Jonico Hardwick	151	2	2018, Round 18	2018	Wing,	2	0	0	8
Jordan Biondi-Odo	95	83	2013, Round 22	2013, 2016–2019	Five-eighth, interchange, Hooker, Halfback, Fullback, Lock,	8	48	1	129
Joseph Ratuvakacereivalu	191	0	2022, Round 1	2022	interchange,	0	0	0	0
Josh Allen	214	x	2024, Round 1	2024	Prop,	x	x	x	x
Josh Vaughan	6	42	2008, Round 1	2008–2009		17	0	0	68
Josh Stuckey	175	18	2020, Round 1	2020–2021	Second-row,	9	0	0	36
Julian Christian	188	34	2022, Round 1	2022–2023	Fullback, Halfback,	8	6	0	44
Justin Castellaro	84	61	2012, Round 18	2012–2018	Centre, Wing,	22	22	0	132
Justin Frain	208	16	2023, Round 3	2023	Second-row,	4	0	0	16
Keelan White	120	11	2015, Round 17	2015–2017	interchange, Lock,	2	0	0	8
Kenneth Fonoti	185	45	2021, Round 9	2021–2023	Second-row, Lock, Prop, Wing, Centre,	4	0	0	16
Khan Ahwang	121	35	2016, Round 1	2016–2017	Wing, Fullback, Centre,	19	103	0	282
Kienan Grogan-Hayes	138	5	2017, Round 7	2017	Fullback, Wing,	2	0	0	8
Kyle Schneider	219	x	2024, Round 1	2024	Hooker,	x	x	x	x
Lachlan West	225	x	2024, Round 6	2024	Fullback,	x	x	x	x
Lancen Joudo	68	13	2011, Round 5	2011		6	0	0	24
Lata Fakalelu	182	26	2021, Round 5	2021–2022	interchange, Prop, Lock,	2	0	0	8
Latu Fifita	101	12	2014, Round 1	2014		1	0	0	4
Linc Port	106	51	2014, Round 21	2014–2016	Fullback, Wing,	37	11	0	170
Luke George	112	41	2015, Round 3	2015–2017	Wing, Centre, interchange,	22	0	0	88
Luke Millwood	33	10	2008, Round 19	2008–2009		3	0	0	12
Luke Saunders	75	13	2011, Round 15	2011–2012		4	0	0	16
Maddie Oosen	81	5	2012, Round 9	2012		0	0	0	0
Mark Cantoni	13	89	2008, Round 1	2008–2011		25	0	0	100
Mark Dalle Cort	49	39	2010, Round 1	2010–2012		9	0	0	36
Mark Rosendale	186	16	2021, Round 10	2021–2022	Wing, interchange,	5	0	0	20
Mat Laumea	156	19	2019, Round 1	2019	Prop, interchange,	0	0	0	0
Matthew Egan	183	33	2021, Round 5	2021–2023	Halfback, interchange, Hooker,	6	0	0	24
Matthew Musumeci	137	36	2017, Round 10	2017, 2019–2021	Wing, Fullback, interchange,	11	0	0	44
Matti Moyle	187	1	2021, Round 14	2021	interchange,	0	0	0	0
Maurice Blair	157	15	2019, Round 1	2019	Second-row, interchange, Prop, Lock,	1	0	0	4
Menmuny Murgha	105	2	2014, Round 8	2014		0	0	0	0
Mervyn Walker	92	1	2013, Round 5	2013		1	0	0	4
Mick Wilson	73	12	2011, Round 13	2011		3	0	0	12
Mitchell Seri	79	4	2012, Round 4	2012		0	4	0	8
Nat McGavin	216	x	2024, Round 1	2024	Wing,	x	x	x	x
Nathan Wales	113	20	2015, Round 3	2015, 2017–2018	Second-row, interchange,	1	0	0	4
Nick Dorante	94	2	2013, Round 12	2013		0	0	0	0
Nick Lui-Toso	171	31	2020, Round 1	2020–2022, 2024	Prop, interchange,	5	0	0	20
Noel Underwood	15	75	2008, Round 1	2008–2013		5	0	0	20
Paea Pua	184	41	2021, Round 6	2021–2023	Prop, interchange,	5	0	0	20
Patrick Gallen	166	5	2019, Round 18	2019–2020	interchange, Hooker,	1	0	0	4
PJ Webb	104	3	2014, Round 7	2014–2015	Second-row	0	0	0	0
Ponepate Tongia	206	4	2023, Round 2	2023	interchange	0	0	0	0
Quincy To'oto'o-ulugia	26	27	2008, Round 11	2008–2010		7	9	0	46
Quinlyn Cannon	164	7	2019, Round 14	2019	interchange, Hooker,	2	0	0	8
Rajan Opetaia-Halls	126	9	2016, Round 5	2016	interchange, Prop, Lock, Second-row,	0	0	0	0
Rashaun Denny	200	21	2023, Round 2	2023–	Centre,	6	0	0	24
Regan Verney	118	4	2015, Round 2	2015	interchange, Second-row,	0	0	0	0
Rhy Young	201	14	2023, Round 2	2023	Wing, interchange,	2	0	0	8
Richie Marsters	28	3	2008, Round 10	2008–2009		0	0	0	0
Rod Griffin	31	69	2008, Round 14	2008–2012, 2020–2021	Prop, interchange,	27	9	0	126
Rod Jensen	37	84	2009, Round 1	2009–2012		37	0	0	148
Ryan Flegler	212	6	2023, Round 10	2023	interchange,	0	0	0	0
Ryan Ghietti	64	137	2011, Round 1	2011–2018	Hooker, Five-eighth, Halfback, interchange, Wing,	29	0	1	117
Ryan Stig	51	19	2010, Round 1	2010		9	53	0	142
Saia Makisi	80	11	2012, Round 6	2012		1	0	0	4
Sam Obst	86	74	2013, Round 1	2013–2015	Halfback, Five-eighth, Second-row,	17	0	1	69
Scott Gibson	76	14	2012, Round 6	2012		4	0	0	16
Seamus King-Smith	213	4	2023, Round 20	2023–	Fullback, interchange,	0	0	0	0
Semi Tadulala	85	53	2013, Round 1	2013–2015	Wing, Centre, interchange,	20	0	0	80
Shaun Nona	71	68	2011, Round 10	2011–2014		11	141	0	326
Shawn Bowen	141	63	2017, Round 17	2017–2022	Wing, Centre, Fullback,	18	0	0	72
Sheldon Powe-Hobbs	72	104	2011, Round 11	2011–2018	interchange, Prop, Halfback,	10	0	0	40
Stephen Sheppard	7	11	2008, Round 1	2008		3	0	0	12
Steve Snitch	88	16	2013, Round 1	2013		1	0	0	4
Steven Tatipata	161	2	2019, Round 7	2019	Centre, Wing,	2	0	0	8
Taniela Ta'ufo'ou	211	8	2023, Round 7	2023	interchange, Lock, Second-row,	1	0	0	4
Taputoa Sonny Rea	56	8	2010, Round 3	2010		1	0	0	4
Terrence Casey-Douglas	158	36	2019, Round 3	2019–2022	interchange, Second-row, Lock, Prop,	2	0	0	8
Theeran Pearson	58	2	2010, Round 4	2010		0	0	0	0
Thomas Duffy	220	x	2024, Round 1	2024	Halfback,	x	x	x	x
Todd Carney	147	8	2018, Round 1	2018	Five-eighth,	1	2	0	8
Tom Chester	224	x	2024, Round 4	2024	Fullback,	x	x	x	x
Tom Hancock	96	24	2013, Round 23	2009	Second-row, interchange, Lock, Prop,	20	47	0	174
Tom Humble	39	2	2009, Round 1	2019		0	0	0	0
Tom McGrath	167	21	2019, Round 18	2021–2022	interchange, Second-row, Lock, Hooker, Prop,	5	0	0	20
Tom Steadman	177	27	2021, Round 1	2021–2022	Five-eighth, Halfback,	3	33	0	78
Troy Kapea	135	40	2017, Round 1	2017–2018	interchange, Lock, Prop,	4	0	0	16
Tyrone McCarthy	99	27	2014, Round 1	2014		9	0	0	36
Vaipuna Tia-Kilifi	110	39	2015, Round 1	2015–2016	Second-row, interchange, Prop, Lock,	4	0	0	16
Warren Jensen	14	17	2008, Round 1	2008		3	0	0	12
Wayne Ulugia	82	27	2012, Round 13	2012–2013		16	0	0	64
Whyatt Barnes	192	24	2022, Round 1	2022–	interchange, Lock, Prop,	0	0	0	0
Will Partridge	189	28	2022, Round 1	2022–	Wing, Centre, interchange,	19	55	0	186
Will Bugden	131	55	2017, Round 1	2017–2019	Prop, interchange,	4	0	0	16
Zac Vella	209	8	2023, Round 3	2023	interchange,	0	0	0	0
Zane Knowles	204	2	2023, Round 2	2023	interchange,	0	0	0	0
Sam Cramp	229	x	2024, Round 14	2024	Second-row,	x	x	x	x

==== North Queensland Cowboys allocation players who played for Pride (2008-2023) ====
Player	Pride Heritage No.	Appearances	First Game	Seasons	Positions	Tries	Goals	FG	Pts
Ben Condon*	174	1	2020, Round 1	2020	Second-row	0	0	0	0
Ben Hampton*	136	17	2017, Round 8	2017-2019, 2021-2022	Five-eighth, Halfback, interchange, Fullback	6	0	0	24
Ben Vaeau*	10	12	2008, Round 1	2008	Prop	3	0	0	12
Braidon Burns*	228	x	2024, Round 9	2024	Centre	x	x	x	x
Brandon Boor*	38	18	2009, Round 4	2009	Wing, interchange	4	0	0	16
Cameron King*	100	22	2014, Round 1	2014-2015	interchange, Lock	5	7	0	34
Carl Webb*	45	4	2009, Round 6	2009-2010	Prop, Second-row	1	0	0	4
Clint Amos*	47	23	2009, Round 2	2009-2011	Prop, Second-row, Hooker	3	0	1	13
Coen Hess*	128	6	2016, Round 14	2016	Second-row	0	0	0	0
Connelly Lemuelu*	169	13	2020, Round 1	2020-2022	Second-row, Centre, Lock	5	0	0	20
Cory Paterson*	74	18	2011, Round 14	2011-2012	Second-row, Lock, interchange	12	26	0	100
David Faiumu*	24	5	2008, Round 2	2008	Second-row, Hooker, interchange	1	0	0	4
David Pangai*	36	4	2009, Round 1	2009	Wing, interchange	1	0	0	4
Emry Pere*	149	24	2018, Round 1	2018	interchange, Lock, Prop	1	0	0	4
Enari Tuala*	146	27	2018, Round 1	2018-2019	Centre, Wing, Fullback	10	0	0	40
Felise Kaufusi*	90	19	2013, Round 2	2013	Prop, Hooker, interchange	1	0	0	4
Harrison Edwards*	226	x	2024, Round 8	2024	Lock, Second-row	x	x	x	x
Heilum Luki*	179	7	2021, Round 1	2021	Prop, Second-row, Lock, interchange	0	0	0	0
Jack Gosiewski	217	x	2024, Round 1	2024	Second-row	x	x	x	x
Jackson Nicolau*	5	19	2008, Round 1	2008	Centre, Five-eighth	7	0	0	28
Jake Clifford*	148	26	2018, Round 1	2018-2021, 2024	Halfback, Five-eighth	14	64	2	186
James Segeyaro*	60	5	2011, Round 1	2011-2012	Hooker, interchange	5	0	0	20
James Tamou*	43	11	2009, Round 1	2009-2010	Prop, Second-row	1	0	0	4
Jeremiah Nanai*	180	7	2021, Round 2	2021	interchange, Prop, Second-row	0	0	0	0
Jodeci Baker-Tiraha*	222	x	2024, Round 2	2024	Centre	x	x	x	x
John Williams*	21	7	2008, Round 3	2008-2010	Wing	4	2	0	20
Kaiden Lahrs*	227	x	2024, Round 8	2024	Prop	x	x	x	x
Kaine Manihera*	55	13	2010, Round 3	2010	Wing	4	0	0	16
Kalifa Faifai Loa*	63	17	2011, Round 1	2011-2012	Wing, Fullback	8	0	0	32
Kurt Baptiste*	159	2	2019, Round 4	2019	interchange	0	0	0	0
Kyle Feldt*	89	30	2013, Round 2	2013-2014, 2023	Centre	20	66	0	212
Lachlan Coote*	109	1	2015, Round 1	2015	Fullback	0	0	0	0
Manase Manuokafoa*	44	16	2009, Round 4	2009-2010	Prop, interchange	2	0	0	8
Marcus Jensen*	130	20	2017, Round 1	2017	Wing	8	0	0	32
Marly Bitungane*	217	x	2024, Round 1	2024	Prop, interchange				0
Matthew Bartlett*	11	21	2008, Round 1	2008-2009	Second-row, interchange	5	0	0	20
Matthew Wright*	97	3	2014, Round 1	2014	Fullback	0	0	0	0
Michael Bani*	57	26	2010, Round 4	2010-2011	Wing	12	0	0	48
Murray Taulagi*	145	19	2018, Round 1	2018	Wing	10	0	0	40
Nene Macdonald*	153	1	2019, Round 1	2019	Wing	1	0	0	4
Nick Slyney*	42	41	2009, Round 1	2009-2010	Second-row, interchange	13	0	0	52
Patrick Kaufusi*	108	33	2014, Round 25	2014-2016	Prop, Hooker, interchange	3	0	0	12
Patrick Mago*	132	20	2017, Round 1	2017	Lock, Second-row, interchange	2	0	0	8
Peter Hola*	152	27	2018, Round 2	2018-2021	Lock, Second-row, interchange	6	0	0	24
Ray Thompson*	93	1	2013, Round 6	2013	interchange	0	0	0	0
Ricky Thorby*	67	54	2011, Round 2	2011-2014	Prop, Second-row, interchange	8	0	0	32
Robert Derby*	194	16	2022, Round 4	2022	Wing	7	0	0	28
Robert Lui*	77	11	2012, Round 1	2012-2014	Halfback, Five-eighth	4	0	0	16
Scott Bolton*	19	14	2008, Round 3	2008-2015	Prop	3	0	0	12
Scott Moore*	91	15	2013, Round 4	2013	Hooker	1	0	0	4
Shaun Hudson*	122	21	2016, Round 1	2016	Centre	4	0	0	16
Steve Southern*	18	1	2008, Round 3	2008, 2010	Second-row, Prop	0	0	0	0
Tom Chester*	224	x	2024, Round 4	2024	Fullback	x	x	x	x
Tom Duffy*	221	x	2024, Round 1	2024	Halfback	x	x	x	x
Travis Burns*	46	2	2009, Round 20	2009	Hooker, interchange	1	0	0	4
Will Tupou*	69	1	2011, Round 4	2011	Centre	0	0	0	0
Wiremu Greig*	173	3	2020, Round 1	2020-2021	Prop	2	0	0	8
Henry Teutau*	230	x	2024, Round 14	2024	Prop	x	x	x	x
Mason Kira*	231		2024, Round 20	2024	Second-row	x	x	x	x

==== Players who played for the Cowboys and the Pride (2008-2023) ====
Player	Pride Heritage No.	Appearances	First Game	Seasons	Positions	Tries	Goals	FG	Pts
Ben Spina^	59	121	2010, Round 8	Pride 2010-2014; Cowboy 2015-2017	Prop, Lock, Second-row, interchange	23	0	0	92
Blake Leary^	65	63	2011, Round 1	Cowboy: 2011-2013; Pride: 2014	Second-row, Lock, interchange	31	6	0	136
Ethan Lowe^	78	45	2012, Round 1	Pride: 2012; Cowboy: 2014, 2018	Second-row	15	27	0	114
Gideon Gela-Mosby^	129	36	2017, Round 1	Cowboy: 2017-2019; Pride: 2020, 2022	Wing, Centre, Fullback	18	0	0	72
Hezron Murgha^	23	89	2008, Round 5	Pride: 2008-2014; Cowboy: 2015	Fullback, Centre, Wing	33	10	0	152
Javid Bowen^	98	91	2014, Round 1	Cowboy: 2014-2019; Pride: 2020-2021	Centre, Wing	36	13	0	170
Joel Riethmuller^	12	89	2008, Round 1	Pride: 2008-2010; Cowboy: 2011-2014	Lock, interchange	16	0	0	64
Luke Harlen^	32	67	2008, Round 15	Pride: 2008-2009, 2011; Cowboy: 2012	Second-row, Prop, interchange	11	0	0	44
Ty Williams^	20	79	2008, Round 2	Pride: 2008-2010; Cowboy: 2011-2013	Centre, Wing, Fullback, Five-eighth	27	0	0	108

=== Players who only played pre-season trials ===
Player	Seasons
Aaron Binawel	2012
Aiden Lee	2016
Ben Cocciolone	2018
Ben Schell	2016
Bill Cullen	2015
Billy McConachie	2012
Brian Murgha	2013
Broski Emery	2015
Clint Posselt	20107
Corey Child	2016, 2019
Dale Ambrym	2018
Dan Moevao	2018
Dan Sagigi	2017
Darryl Grant	2010
Elijah Simpson	2019
Francis Mosby	2011, 2012
Freddie Fauid	2011
Gabriel Bon	2020
George House	2017, 2018
Ian King	2016
Jacob McCarthy	2020
Jacob Rivett	2017
Jacob Wallace	2016, 2020
Jad Mahmoud	2017
James Dempsey	2019
Jamie Kerwick	2012, 2015
Jared Burton	2016
Jayden Gil	2014
Joel Marama	2012, 2017
Josateki Murray	2013
John O'Sullivan	2009
Jordon Tighe	2013
Justin Dolan	2012
Marvin Toko	2017
Masi Nona	2012
Milton Mossman	2018
Nathan Kepa	2011
Ned Blackman	2017
Nick Obodin	2010
Nigel Naawi	2010
Patrick Lewis	2016
Pete Tognolini	2013
Raymon Tuaimalo-Vaega	2020
Rickki Sutherland	2012, 2013
Robbie Kyles	2009
Rohan Schultz	2012
Ryan Bartlett	2008
Sam Pau	2015, 2017
Shaun Cribb	2008
Siaosi Liumaunu	2010
Taha Tutavake	2014
Taulata Fakalelu	2020
Tom Hancock	2011
Travis Peeters	2015
Trey Kemp	2014
Troyson Bassani	2012, 2017
Wees Nawia	2012
Willem Foster	2018
Zac Parter	2013

=== Pride representative players ===
==== Queensland Country Representatives ====
Clint Amos
Scott Bolton
Tom Humble
Rod Jensen
Alex Starmer
Mark Cantoni
Joel Riethmuller

==== Queensland Residents ====
Clint Amos
Scott Bolton
Tom Humble
Rod Jensen
Brett Anderson
Mark Cantoni
Joel Riethmuller
Hezron Murgha
Ben Spina
Blake Leary
Shaun Nona
Javid Bowen
Davin Crampton

==== International Representatives ====
Player	Competition
Noel Underwood	(Australia) Australian Indigenous 19s
Jack Svendsen	(Australia) Australian Institute of Sport
Nene MacDonald	(Australia) Australian Schoolboys
Brett Anderson	(Australia) Australian Schoolboys
Bernard Lewis	(Australia) Australian Under 15s Merit Side, (Papua New Guinea) PNG Kumuls
Joel Riethmuller	Italy Azzuri
Ryan Ghietti	Italy Azzuri
Justin Castellaro	Italy Azzuri
Jamie Frizzo	Italy Azzuri
Saia Makisi	Tonga Mate Ma'a
Rod Griffin	(Papua New Guinea) PNG Kumuls
Jay Aston	(Papua New Guinea) PNG Kumuls
Mark Cantoni	(United States) USA Tomahawks
Kaine Manihera	New Zealand Maori
Tyrone McCarthy	Ireland Ireland Wolfhounds

=== Northern Pride players who played in the National Rugby League ===
Player	NRL Clubs		
Aidan Day	North Queensland Cowboys		
Ben Laity	North Queensland Cowboys		
Ben Spina	North Queensland Cowboys		
Blake Leary	Manly Warringah Sea Eagles		
Brenton Bowen	North Queensland Cowboys	Gold Coast Titans	
Brett Anderson	North Queensland Cowboys	Parramatta Eels	Melbourne Storm
Chris Sheppard	North Queensland Cowboys	St. George Illawarra Dragons	
Davin Crampton	Gold Coast Titans		
Ethan Lowe	North Queensland Cowboys		
Germaine Paulson	South Sydney Rabbitohs		
Graham Clark	Canterbury Bulldogs		
Greg Byrnes	North Queensland Cowboys		
Hezron Murgha	North Queensland Cowboys		
Jackson Nicolau	Gold Coast Titans		
Jaiman Lowe	South Sydney Rabbitohs		
Joel Riethmuller	North Queensland Cowboys		
Lancen Joudo	Cronulla Sharks		
Luke Harlen	Cronulla Sharks	North Queensland Cowboys	
Noel Underwood	Newcastle Knights		
Sam Obst	Sydney Roosters		
Saia Makisi	Western Suburbs Magpies		
Semi Tadulala	Melbourne Storm		
Shaun Nona	Melbourne Storm		
Sheldon Powe-Hobbs	Melbourne Storm		
Rod Jensen	North Queensland Cowboys		
Ryan Stig	Newcastle Knights		
Tom Humble	Wests Tigers	Parramatta Eels	
Ty Williams	North Queensland Cowboys		

=== Pride players who played Super League (Northern Hemisphere) ===
Player	Super League Clubs		
Ben Jeffries	Bradford Bulls		
Luke George	Bradford Bulls	Wakefield Trinity Wildcats	
Mark Dalle Cort	Celtic Crusaders		
Rod Jensen	Huddersfield Giants		
Sam Obst	Wakefield Trinity Wildcats	Hull F.C.	
Semi Tadulala	Wakefield Trinity Wildcats	Bradford Bulls	
Steve Snitch	Wakefield Trinity Wildcats	Huddersfield Giants	Castleford Tigers
Tyrone McCarthy	Warrington Wolves	Hull Kingston Rovers	

=== Pride players who played UK Betfred Championship ===
Player	Championship Club
Latu Fifita	Workington Town
Saia Makisi	Whitehaven
Sam Obst	Keighley Cougars
Semi Tadulala	Keighley Cougars
Steve Snitch	Doncaster RLFC

=== Pride players who played French Elite One Championship ===
Player	Elite One Club
Mark Cantoni	Salanque Méditerranée Pia XIII (Pia Donkeys)
Saia Makisi	AS Carcassonne

== Venues ==
Between 2008 and 2023 the Pride played at 56 different venues across Queensland, New South Wales and Papua New Guinea.

Venue	Location	State
Barlow Park, Parramatta Park	Cairns Region	Queensland
West Barlow Park, Parramatta Park	Cairns Region	Queensland
Vico Oval (a.k.a. Pride Oval), Mooroobool	Cairns Region	Queensland
Stan Williams Park, Manunda	Cairns Region	Queensland
Ivanhoes Rugby League Club, Smithfield	Cairns Region	Queensland
Jones Park CDJRL Ground, (a.k.a. Mann Street Field), Westcourt	Cairns Region	Queensland
Alley Park, Gordonvale	Cairns Region	Queensland
Petersen Park, Edmonton	Cairns Region	Queensland
Jilara Oval, Yarrabah	Cairns Region	Queensland
Atherton JRL Grounds, Atherton	Atherton Tableland	Queensland
Atherton Showgrounds (a.k.a. NQ Hardware Stadium / Roosters Stadium), Atherton	Atherton Tableland	Queensland
Davies Park, Mareeba	Atherton Tableland	Queensland
Ravenshoe JRL Grounds, Ravenshoe	Atherton Tableland	Queensland
Mossman Showgrounds, Mossman	Cape York	Queensland
John Street Oval, Cooktown	Cape York	Queensland
Andoom Oval, Weipa	Cape York	Queensland
Yusia Ginau Oval, Bamaga	Cape York	Queensland
Ken Brown Oval, Thursday Island	Cape York	Queensland
Billy Slater Oval, Callendar Park, Innisfail	Cassowary Coast Region	Queensland
Tully Showgrounds, Tully	Cassowary Coast Region	Queensland
Alec Inch Oval, Mount Isa	North West Queensland	Queensland
Queensland Country Bank Stadium	Townsville	Queensland
Jack Manski Oval, Kirwan	Townsville	Queensland
Townsville Centrals ASA Oval, Illich Park, Aitkenvale	Townsville	Queensland
Townsville Sports Reserve	Townsville	Queensland
Rugby Park	Ayr	Queensland
Burdekin Football Fields	Ayr	Queensland
Shark Park	South Mackay	Queensland
Stadium Mackay (a.k.a. Mackay Junior Fields / Virgin Australia Stadium / BB Print Stadium)	South Mackay	Queensland
Alan McIndoe Park, Emerald	Central Highlands Region	Queensland
Darryl Bourke Oval, Moranbah	Isaac Region	Queensland
Browne Park, Wandal	Rockhampton	Queensland
Marley Brown Oval	Gladstone	Queensland
Ralph Stafford Park, Hervey Bay	Fraser Coast Region	Queensland
Sunshine Coast Stadium (a.k.a. Stockland Park), Kawana Waters	Sunshine Coast	Queensland
Meakin Park	Logan	Queensland
North Ipswich Reserve	Ipswich	Queensland
Briggs Rd Sporting Complex	Ipswich	Queensland
Clive Berghofer Stadium	Toowoomba	Queensland
Dolphin Oval (a.k.a. Kayo Stadium / Moreton Daily Stadium)	Redcliffe	Queensland
Albert Bishop Park, Nundah	Brisbane	Queensland
Davies Park, West End	Brisbane	Queensland
Iona College, Lindum	Brisbane	Queensland
Kougari Oval (a.k.a. BMD Kougari Oval), Manly West	Brisbane	Queensland
Suncorp Stadium, Milton, Queensland	Brisbane	Queensland
Langlands Park (a.k.a. Totally Workwear, Suzuki and Tap Out Energy Stadium), Stones Corner	Brisbane	Queensland
Pinklands Sporting Complex, Thornlands	Redland City	Queensland
Pizzey Park (a.k.a. UAA Park), Miami	Gold Coast	Queensland
Tugun RLFC (Betty Diamond Complex), Tugun	Gold Coast	Queensland
Piggabeen Sports Complex, Tweed Heads West	Northern Rivers	New South Wales
Ned Byrne Oval, Cudgen Park, Kingscliff	Northern Rivers	New South Wales
ANZ Stadium, Sydney Olympic Park	Sydney	New South Wales
Redfern Oval, Redfern, New South Wales	Sydney	New South Wales
Kalabond Oval, Kokopo	East New Britain Province	Papua New Guinea
Sir John Guise Stadium	Port Moresby	Papua New Guinea
PNG Football Stadium (a.k.a. Santos National Football Stadium, Oil Search Stadium)	Port Moresby	Papua New Guinea

== Televised games ==
Between 2008 and 2011, one Queensland Cup match per round was televised free-to-air by ABC TV, with the game shown live across Queensland on ABC1 on Saturday afternoons at 2:00pm (AEST). The commentary team was Gerry Collins, Warren Boland and David Wright. The Pride had 20 matches televised by the ABC.

In 2012, the Nine Entertainment Network and Fox Sports acquired the broadcast rights. They continued to show one Q Cup game per round, live and free-to-air across Queensland on Channel 9 or GEM in south-east Queensland, on WIN Television (RTQ) in regional areas, and on Imparja Television in remote areas. From 2013 matches were also broadcast in Papua New Guinea on Kundu 2 TV.

The weekly televised match was played on Sunday afternoons at 2:00pm (AEST). In 2018, the match was rescheduled to 1:00pm (AEST) on Saturday afternoon, but this time slot was unpopular and ratings fell, and so in 2019 the televised match returned to a 2:00pm (AEST) Sunday time-slot. From 2021 Channel 9 only broadcast finals matches, with the weekly featured match shown on-demand on 9Now, and from 2022 on QPlus.TV and Kayo Free.

The Channel 9 commentary team included Andrew Voss, Ben Ikin, Nick Curry, Paul Green, Matthew Thompson, Scott Sattler, Adrian Vowles, Taylor Brown, Warren Boland, Drury Forbes, and Adam Jackson.

Between 2012 and 2018, the Pride had 29 matches televised by Channel 9, with eight of these matched being home games. The first game broadcast from Barlow Park, Cairns was Round 13, Sunday 10 June 2012 against the Pride's traditional rivals Mackay Cutters.

=== Live streaming ===
In 2011 the Pride began live-streaming their home games, starting with the last home game of the season (Round 22 against Tweed Heads). For the 2012 season, home games were live-streamed via the Pride website using video distribution service Rivus TV Ltd. Games were free for members to watch, and $5 per game for non-members. From Round 5 2012 away games were streamed through the website as well.

From 2013 to 2016, all matches (including pre-season trials but excluding matches broadcast live by Channel Nine) were streamed live through the Pride website, with access granted exclusively to Pride members. Video production was by Studio Productions and the commentary team was Adam Jackson and Northern Pride Under-18s coach, Cameron 'Spiller' Miller.

In 2022 Sydney based Cluch.tv gained exclusive rights for live-streaming all QRL games; Hostplus Cup, BMD Premiership, Auswide Bank Mal Meninga Cup, Cyril Connell Challenge, Harvey Norman U19, and Harvey Norman U17. The subscription service operated under the website name Qplus.TV, with Cluch selling a subscription to all games for $4.99 a week or $49.99 a season. In September 2023 Cluch Pty. Ltd. entered voluntary administration with the QRL owed $233,000.

QRL relaunched QPlus.TV at the start of the 2024 season with the same subscription deal. The match of the round is shown free on QPlus, 9Now and Kayo Free.

== See also ==
- National Rugby League reserves affiliations
