= Josh Stuckey =

Australian rugby league footballer

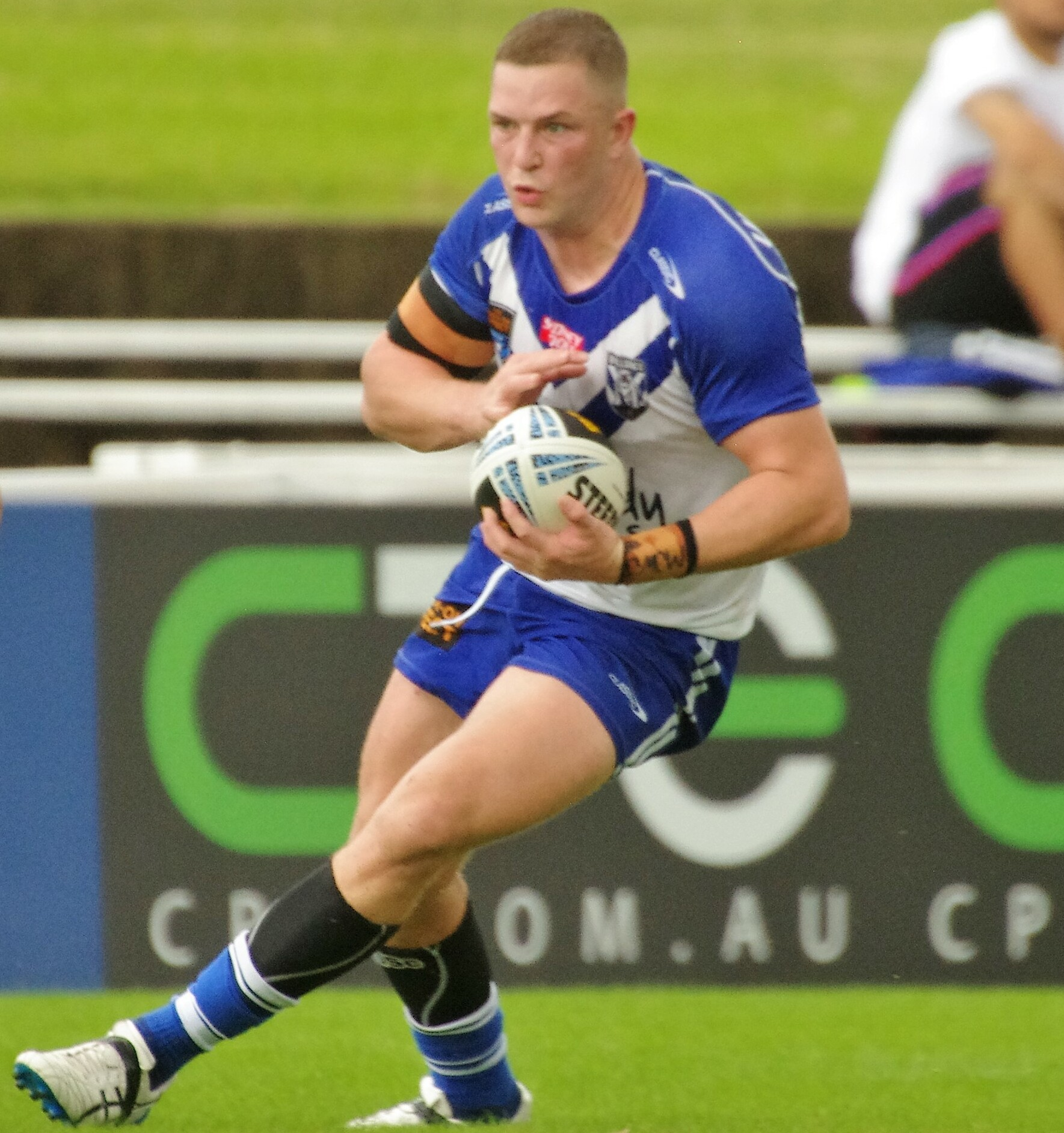

Personal information
- Full name: Joshua Stuckey
- Born: 24 July 1998 (age 28) Canberra, Australia
- Height: 192 cm (6 ft 4 in)
- Weight: 104 kg (16 st 5 lb)

Playing information
- Position: Lock
Club
| Years | Team | Pld | T | G | FG | P |
|---|---|---|---|---|---|---|
| 2022 | Canterbury Bulldogs | 1 | 0 | 0 | 0 | 0 |
- Source: As of 28 August 2022

Josh Stuckey (born 24 July 1998) is an Australian professional rugby league footballer who plays as a lock for the Townsville Blackhawks in the Queensland Cup.

He previously played for the Canterbury-Bankstown Bulldogs in the NRL.

== Biography ==
=== Early career ===
Hailing from Queanbeyan where he played for the Queanbeyan Blues, he won the Bradley Clyde Medal as player of the match in the Blues' 2019 Canberra Raiders Cup Grand Final win over Goulburn Workers Bulldogs. Stuckey also played junior representative rugby league for the Canberra Raiders in the Jersey Flegg Cup competition before moving to Cairns at the start of the 2020 season to join the Northern Pride.

Following the cancelled 2020 Queensland Cup season, in 2021 Stuckey played for the Pride in the Queensland Cup. Stuckey's move north saw him win the Pride's 2021 Player of Year Award, as well as the Player's Player and Member's Player of the Year awards. He was signed by the Canterbury-Bankstown Bulldogs in August 2021, joining the Bulldogs ahead of the 2022 NRL season.

Stuckey was named to the 2021 Queensland Cup Team of the Year as a second-rower.

=== 2022 ===
In round 24 of the 2022 NRL season, Stuckey made his debut for Canterbury-Bankstown against the Cronulla-Sutherland Sharks. On 25 September, Stuckey played for Canterbury's NSW Cup team in their grand final loss to Penrith at the Western Sydney Stadium. In December, Stuckey signed a train and trial contract with Manly ahead of the 2023 NRL season.

=== 2023 ===
While part of Manly's extended squad for the 2023 NRL season, Stuckey would play with their affiliate club Blacktown Workers in the NSW Cup competition, before moving to the Wynnum Manly Seagulls in the Queensland Cup.

=== 2024 ===
Stuckey played 20 games for Wynnum Manly in 2024, scoring 5 tries for the year.

=== 2025 ===
Stuckey played for the South Sydney Rabbitohs in the 2025 pre-season trials before signing with the Rabbitohs feeder team, Townsville Blackhawks for the 2025 season.
