= Bernard Lewis (rugby league) =

Australian rugby league footballer

Personal information
- Born: 23 October 1997 (age 29) Cairns, Queensland, Australia
- Height: 183 cm (6 ft 0 in)
- Weight: 96 kg (15 st 2 lb)

Playing information
- Position: Wing, Centre
Club
Years	Team	Pld	T	G	FG	P
2020–2023	Northern Pride	44	9	0	0	36
Representative
Years	Team	Pld	T	G	FG	P
2019	Papua New Guinea	1	0	0	0	0
2019–	Papua New Guinea 9s	1	0	0	0	0
- Source: As of 20 October 2019

Bernard Lewis (born 23 October 1997) is a Papua New Guinea international rugby league footballer who plays as a winger for the Northern Pride in the Queensland Cup.

== Early life ==
Lewis was born in Cairns, Queensland, Australia, and is of Torres Strait Islander and Papua New Guinean descent. Lewis qualifies for Papua New Guinea via his mother, who is from Daru Island, an island of the Torres Strait governed by Papua New Guinea.

== Playing career ==
Lewis won the 2016 National Youth League premiership with the Sydney Roosters before playing a leading role in the clubs 2017 Auckland Nines title run.

The winger scored an 80 metre match winning try in their semi-final against the Melbourne Storm then went across for another four pointer in the final against Penrith.

Lewis made his international debut for Papua New Guinea in their 24–6 loss to Samoa in the 2019 Oceania Cup. On 2 October 2019, Lewis was named in the Papua New Guinea team for the 2019 Rugby league World Cup 9s.
