= Connelly Lemuelu =

Samoa international rugby league footballer

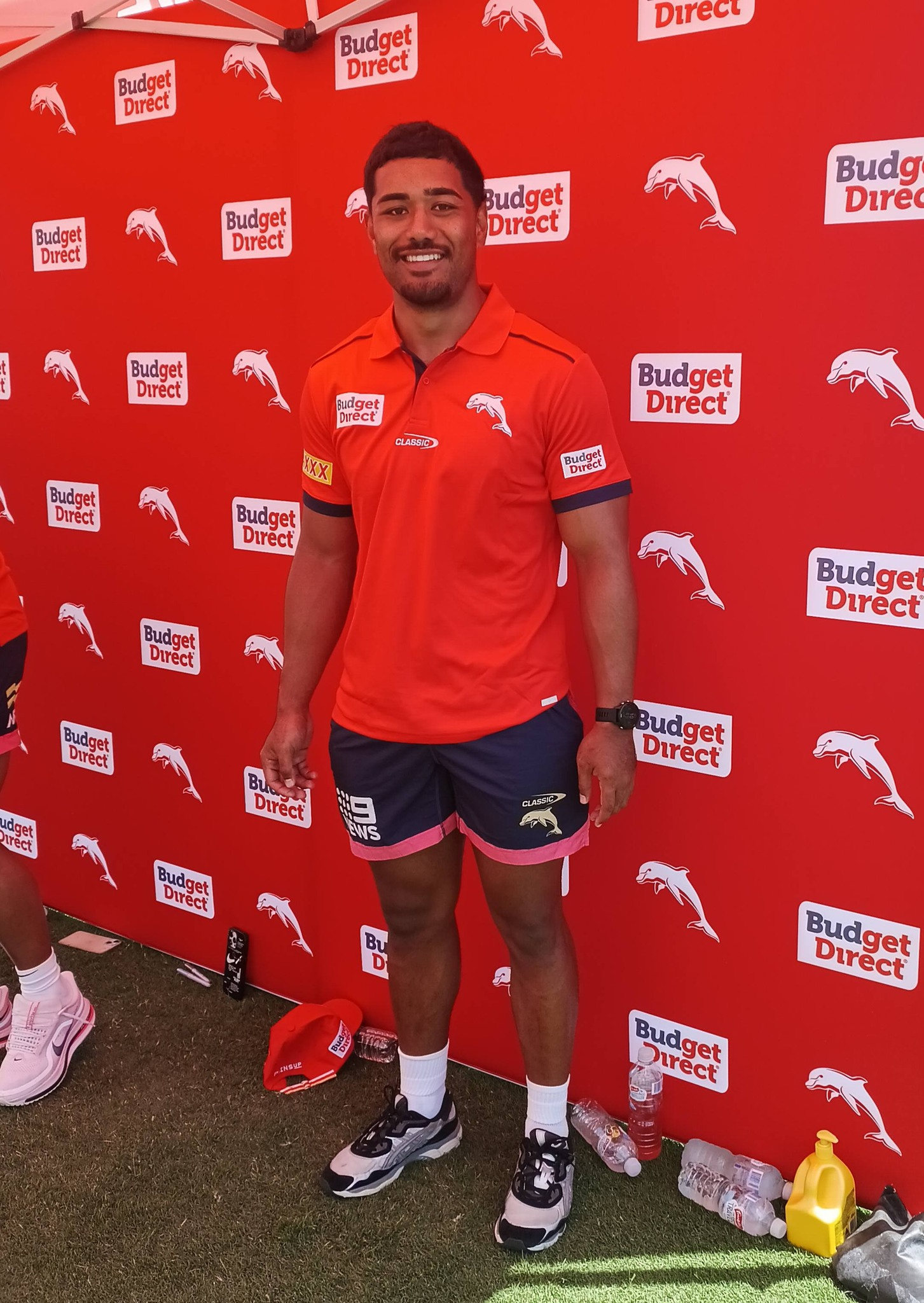

Personal information
- Born: 7 July 1998 (age 28) Auckland, New Zealand
- Height: 190 cm (6 ft 3 in)
- Weight: 106 kg (16 st 10 lb)

Playing information
- Position: Second-row, Centre
Club
Years	Team	Pld	T	G	FG	P
2020–22	North Qld Cowboys	24	4	0	0	16
2023–	Dolphins	85	23	0	0	92
	Total	109	27	0	0	108
Representative
Years	Team	Pld	T	G	FG	P
2023–	Samoa	5	0	0	0	0
- Source: As of 8 November 2026

Connelly Lemuelu (born 7 July 1998) is a Samoa international rugby league footballer who plays as a second-row forward for the Dolphins in the National Rugby League (NRL). He previously played for the North Queensland Cowboys in the NRL as a centre.

== Background ==
Born and raised in Auckland, New Zealand, Lemuelu played rugby union for Papatoetoe before moving to Australia as a fifteen-year old to attend Keebra Park State High School. While at Keebra Park, he signed with the Wests Tigers.

== Playing career ==
=== Early career (2016-2019) ===
In 2016, Lemuelu was a member of Keebra Park's rugby league team. In the Queensland state championship game, he kicked the winning field goal in a 27–26 win over Coombabah State High School. On 14 September 2016, he started at fullback in Keebra Park's 24–26 loss to Westfields Sports High School in the GIO Schoolboy Cup final, scoring two tries.

In 2017, Lemuelu moved to Sydney, joining the Wests Tigers under-20 side. In 2019, after two seasons with the Tigers, Lemuelu joined the Canterbury-Bankstown Bulldogs, playing for their New South Wales Cup side. On 3 July 2019, he was elevated to the Bulldogs' NRL squad, signing a development contract.

=== North Queensland Cowboys (2020-2022) ===
On 29 October 2019, Lemuelu signed a two-year deal with the North Queensland Cowboys. In February 2020, he was a member of the Cowboys' 2020 NRL Nines winning squad. On 22 February, he started on the wing in the Cowboys 18–16 pre-season trial win over the Brisbane Broncos, scoring a try. He started the 2020 season playing for the Cowboys' Queensland Cup feeder club, the Northern Pride. In Round 6 of the 2020 NRL season, Lemuelu made his NRL debut against the Wests Tigers. In Round 14, he scored his first NRL try in a 30–31 loss to the South Sydney Rabbitohs. In 2021, Lemuelu played thirteen matches and scored one try for North Queensland. In 2022, he played four matches and scored two tries.

International

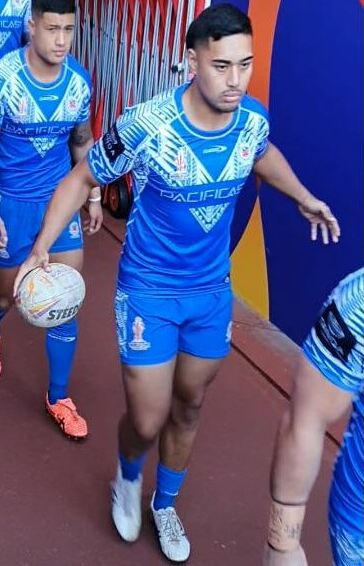
Lemuelu in 2022 for Samoa

After missing out on initial international selection, he was called up as a replacement into the Samoa squad for the 2021 Rugby League World Cup – Men's tournament in late 2022.

=== Dolphins (2023-present) ===
In round 1 of the 2023 NRL season, Lemuelu made his club debut for the Dolphins and scored a try in their inaugural game in the national competition, defeating the Sydney Roosters 28-18 at Suncorp Stadium. In round 9, he scored two tries in the Dolphins 30-31 loss to the Canberra Raiders at McDonalds Park, Wagga Wagga. In total, Lemuelu played twenty-three games and scored seven tries for the Dolphins in 2023. He played a total of 18 games for the Dolphins in the 2024 NRL season as the club finished 10th on the table. On 18 December, the Dolphins announced that Lemuelu had re-signed with the club until the end of 2026. In round 14 of the 2025 NRL season, he scored two tries as the Dolphins defeated St. George Illawarra 56-6. He played 24 matches for the club in the 2026 NRL season including their preliminary final loss to eventual premiers the Sydney Roosters.

== Statistics ==
Year	Team	Games	Tries	Pts
2020	North Queensland Cowboys	7	1	4
2021	North Queensland Cowboys	13	1	4
2022	North Queensland Cowboys	4	2	8
2023	Dolphins	23	7	28
2024	Dolphins	18	1	4
2025	Dolphins	20	9	36
2026	Dolphins	24	6	24
2027	Dolphins			
	Totals	109	27	108

== Achievements and accolades ==
=== Team ===
- 2020 NRL Nines: North Queensland Cowboys – Winners
