= 2017 Northern Pride RLFC season =

Coordinates: 16°55′49″S 145°46′2″E

Northern Pride
Club information
- Full name: Northern Pride Rugby League Football Club
- Nickname: The Pride
- Colours: Black, teal and gold
- Founded: 2007
- Website: northernpride.com.au

Current details
- Ground: Barlow Park, Cairns (seating 1,700, standing 15,000)
- CEO: Rod Jensen (2015–2016)
- Coach: Ty Williams (2017–2023)
- Captain: Ryan Ghietti (2016–2018)
- Competition: Intrust Super Cup
- 2017: 12th
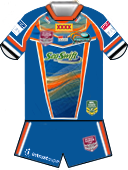
- Home colours

Records
- Premierships: 2 (2010, 2014)
- Runners-up: 1 (2009)
- Minor premierships: 3 (2013, 2014, 2024)

2017 was the tenth competitive season for Sea Swift Northern Pride Rugby League Football Club. This team is based in Cairns, Queensland, Australia. They were one of 14 clubs that played in the twenty-first season of Queensland's top rugby league competition, QRL's Intrust Super Cup, with each team playing 11 home games and 12 away games over 25 weeks between March and August.

The sacked CEO Rod Jensen was replaced by Greg Dowling. Dowling had a long playing career, having been a Kangaroo (1984–1987), played for the Maroons in Origin (1984–1987), Wynnum Manly (1981–1985) in the Brisbane Rugby League, Northern Suburbs (1987) in the Winfield State League, the Broncos (1988–1991) in the Winfield Cup, and Wigan Warriors in England RL's Championship and Challenge Cup.

Interim chairman, Terry Mackenroth stood down and was replaced by board member and Cairns real estate agent Tony Williamson.

Feedback from fans convinced the club to return home games to Saturday evenings, as last year's move to 3:00pm on Sunday afternoons was not popular and crowd numbers fell. Home games this year were on Saturday evenings at 5:30pm, except for Round 17, 'Rivalry Round' against Mackay Cutters which was held at 1:40pm on Sunday afternoon and shown live on Channel 9.

Coach Joe O'Callaghan (2015–2016) resigned at the end of last season, and was replaced by Ty Williams, who had played for the Cairns Cyclones in QCup (1999), played for the NRL's North Queensland Cowboys (2002–2010), represented Queensland in State of Origin (2005), and played for the Indigenous All Stars (2008 and 2010). Williams had played 78 games for the Pride (2009–2013), 52 of them as captain (2011–2013). After leaving the Pride, he was captain-coach of CDRL Innisfail Leprechauns, and more recently had been the Lep's coach.

The Pride struggled this year, winning only six games, and losing seventeen, including eight losses in a row from Round 11 to Round 19. The Pride, who previously had an unenviable record of wins at home, managed only two victories at Barlow Park. They finished in twelfth place, their worst season to date.

== Team of the Decade ==
To mark the ten-year anniversary of the Northern Pride, a 'Team of the Decade' was selected. Eligible players had to have played 30 matches for the Pride. The selection panel was Brett Allen, Rhys O'Neill, Pat Bailey, Greg Dowling, Rob White and Bob Fowler. The Team was announced at a Gala Anniversary Dinner on 30 June 2017.

== 2017 Season - Sea Swift Northern Pride ==
- Competition: Intrust Super Cup
- Sponsor: Sea Swift

=== Staff ===
==== Coaches/Trainers ====
- Coach: Ty Williams
- Assistant coach: Sam Obst
- Assistant coach: Shane O'Flanagan
- Mal Meninga Cup U-18s coaches: Dave Scott
- Cyril Connell Cup U-16s coach:
- Strength and conditioning coach: Jonnie Walker

==== Captain ====
- Ryan Ghietti
- Jared Allen (Vice-captain)

=== Managers ===
- Administration Manager: Kerri Neil then Lauren Dowling
- Marketing Officer: Rachael Tierney
- Team manager: Alan Marsh
- Assistant manager (Home): Kev Anderson
- Assistant manager (Away): Murray Stalley
- Chief executive: Greg Dowling
- Chairman: Tony Williamson
- Board of Directors: Colin Moore (CDRL), Ian Lydiard (CDJRL), Troy McGuane, (Cairns Post), Gail Andrejic (finance), Stephen Tillett, Rob White (football), Eleanor Scott (government). Peter Parr (Cowboys)

== Squad ==
The Pride used 31 players this season. Fourteen players from last year signed with the club again, and one of the Cowboys allocation players from last year was assigned to the Pride again this year. Fourteen new players made their debut this season; ten were new signings (Brad Lupi, Connor Jones, Darryn Schonig, Jack Brock, Jack Campagnolo, Kienan Grogan-Hayes, Matthew Musumeci, Shawn Bowen, Troy Kapea and Will Bugden), and four were new Cowboys allocation players (Ben Hampton*, Gideon Gela-Mosby*, Marcus Jensen* and Patrick Mago*). Joel Riethmuller came out of retirement and Graham Clark came back from the Canterbury-Bankstown Bulldogs.

Ryan Ghietti (c) – HK
Jared Allen – FE (vc)
Luke George (vc) – WG
Aidan Day – PR
Brad Lupi – HB
Bradley Stephen – PR
Colin Wilkie – SR, LK
Connor Jones – PR
Darryn Schonig – SR
Fred Koraba – SR
Graham Clark – PR
Jack Brock – PR

Joel Riethmuller – LK
Jordan Biondi-Odo – FE
Justin Castellaro – CE
Keelan White
Khan Ahwang – FB, CE
Lachlan Parmenter – SR
Matthew Musumeci – PR
Nathan Wales – PR
Sheldon Powe-Hobbs – LK, SR
Tom Hancock – SR
Troy Kapea – PR
Troyson Basinni – PR

North Queensland Cowboys allocation

Ben Hampton* – FB, CE
Ben Spina* – PR, LK
Gideon Gela-Mosby* – FB, WG
Javid Bowen* – CE, WG
Marcus Jensen* – CE, WG
Patrick Mago* – PR

Allocated but did not play for the Pride in 2017:
Coen Hess* – PR
Scott Bolton – PR, SR

=== 2017 player gains ===
Player	From League	From Club
Joel Riethmuller	CDRL	Brothers Cairns
Graham Clark	NRL Telstra Premiership	Canterbury-Bankstown Bulldogs
Connor Jones	NRL Under-20s	Canterbury-Bankstown Bulldogs U-20s
Darryn Schonig	NRL Under-20s	North Queensland Cowboys U-20s
Will Bugden	Intrust Super Cup	Tweed Heads Seagulls
Brad Lupi	Intrust Super Cup	Mackay Cutters
Troy Kapea	Intrust Super Cup	Townsville Blackhawks
Bradley Stephen	CDRL	Innisfail Leprechauns
Shawn Bowen	CDRL	Mossman-Port Douglas Sharks
Marvin Toko	CDRL	Ivanhoes Knights
Kienan Grogan-Hayes		
Matthew Musumeci		
Jack Brock		
Jack Campagnolo		

=== Player losses after 2016 season ===
Player	To League	To Club
Denzel King	Resigned (work commitments)	
David Murphy	Intrust Super Cup	Easts Tigers
Jack Svendsen	Intrust Super Cup	Easts Tigers
Linc Port	Intrust Super Cup	Easts Tigers
Brayden Torpy	Intrust Super Cup	Easts Tigers
Menmuny Murgha	Intrust Super Cup	Norths Devils
Rajan Opetaia-Halls	Intrust Super Cup	Norths Devils
Greg Miglio	Intrust Super Cup	Norths Devils
Luke La Rosa	Intrust Super Cup	Mackay Cutters
Vaipuna Tia Kilifi	Intrust Super Premiership NSW	Windsor Mounties
Akeripa Tia Kilifi	Intrust Super Premiership NSW	Windsor Mounties

==== Cowboys no longer allocated to the Pride ====
Player	To League	To Club
Patrick Kaufusi*		
Shaun Hudson*		

=== 2017 season launch ===
- Pre-season training: 7 November 2016.
- Pre-season boot camp:
- 2017 Sponsors Launch: 25 February 2017, Whitfield Chapel, Whitfield

==== 2017 player awards ====
27 August 2017, Brothers World of Entertainment, Manunda

- Player of the Year: Graham Clark
- Players' Player: Graham Clark
- Rookie of the Year: Troy Kapea
- Best Back: Jordan Biondi-Odo
- Best Forward: Darryn Schonig
- Most improved player: Nathan Wales
- John O'Brien Perpetual Club Person of the Year: Shane Howton

===== 2017 player records =====
- Most Games: Jordan Biondi-Odo (23), Graham Clark (23).
- Most Tries: Gideon Gela-Mosby* (8), Marcus Jensen* (8)
- Most Points: Khan Ahwang (80)

==== 2017 representative players ====
(Italy) Ryan Ghietti
(Italy) Joel Riethmuller
(Italy) Justin Castellaro
(Italy) Colin Wilkie

Played for Italy Azzurri in the 2017 Rugby League World Cup qualification

=== Jerseys ===
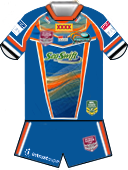
2017 primary Jersey

2017 alternative Jersey

=== Trial matches ===
Round	Opponent	Score	Date	Venue
Trial 1	NYC NQ Cowboys U-20s	12 – 18	Saturday, 4 February 2017	Callendar Park, Innisfail
Trial 2	Townsville Blackhawks	10 – 6	Saturday, 11 February 2017	Smithfield Sporting Complex, Smithfield
Trial 3	PNG Hunters	24 – 30	Saturday, 18 February 2017	Vico Oval, Mooroobool

Pre-season Trial 1
Saturday
4 February 2017
16:00 AEST (UTC+10)

Northern Pride	12 – 18	NYC NQ Cowboys U-20s
Tries: ? Goals: ?		Tries: ? Goals: ?

Billy Slater Oval
(Callendar Park, Innisfail, QLD)

Sea Swift Northern Pride: 1. Matthew Musumeci – FB 2. Sam Pau – WG 3. Troyson Basinni – CE 4. Bradley Stephen – CE 5. Patrick Lewis – WG 6. Jack Campagnolo – FE 7. Ned Blackman – HB 8. Nathan Wales – PR 9. Clint Posselt – HK 10. Brad Lupi – PR 11. Marvin Toko – SR 12. Fred Koraba – SR 13. Lachlan Parmenter – LK
Unlimited Interchange: 14. George House, 15. Jacob Rivett, 16. Dan Sagigi, 17. Joel Marama, 18. Jack Brock, 19. Aidan Day, 20. Jad Mahmoud.
NYC U-20s North Queensland Cowboys: ?
- Note: This game was going to be played at CDRL Southern Suburbs' ground at Alley Park, Gordonvale, but renovation works were not completed in time and so the game was moved to Innisfail.
  This was Ty Williams first game as coach. He selected a young squad, with a large contingent of the club's CDRL portability program. The game was played in very wet and difficult conditions.

Pre-season Trial 2
Saturday
11 February 2017
19:00 AEST (UTC+10)

Northern Pride	10 – 6	Townsville Blackhawks
Tries: ? Goals: ?	Half-time: 0 – 6	Tries: ? Goals: 3

Ivanhoes Knights Rugby League Club
(Smithfield Sporting Complex, Smithfield, QLD)

Sea Swift Northern Pride: 1. Khan Ahwang – FB 2. Jared Allen – WG 3. Troyson Basinni – CE 4. Jordan Biondi-Odo – CE 5. Jack Brock – WG 6. Graham Clark – FE 7. Aidan Day – HB 8. Luke George – PR 9. Ryan Ghietti (c) – HK 10. Tom Hancock – PR 11. Connor Jones – SR 12. Troy Kapea – SR 13. Brad Lupi – LK
Unlimited Interchange: 14. Matthew Musumeci, 15. Fred Koraba, 16. Lachlan Parmenter, 17. Sheldon Powe-Hobbs, 18. Darryn Schonig, 19. Bradley Stephen, 20. Nathan Wales.
Unavailable: Will Bugden, Javid Bowen*, Ben Spina*, Gideon Gela-Mosby*, and Ben Hampton* (selected to play for the North Queensland Cowboys in a pre-season trial against the Sydney Roosters in Mackay tonight.
Townsville and Districts Mendi Blackhawks: ?
- Note: This game was going to be played at CDRL Mossman-Port Douglas Sharks' ground at Mossman Showgrounds, but the Blackhawks objected to travelling 75 km up the coast from Cairns airport to Mossman, so the games was played at CDRL Ivanhoes Knights' home ground at Smithfield instead.

Pre-season Trial 3
Saturday
18 February 2017
18:15 AEST (UTC+10)

Northern Pride	24 – 30	PNG Hunters
Tries: ? Goals: ?	Half-time: 6 – 6	Tries: ? Goals: ?

Vico Oval
(Mooroobool, QLD)

Sea Swift Northern Pride: 1. Khan Ahwang – FB 2. Bradley Stephen – WG 3. Luke George – CE 4. Justin Castellaro – CE 5. Matthew Musumeci – WG 6. Jordan Biondi-Odo – FE 7. Jared Allen – HB 8. Darryn Schonig – PR 9. Ryan Ghietti (c) – HK 10. Sheldon Powe-Hobbs – PR 11. Graham Clark – SR 12. Lachlan Parmenter – SR 13. Troy Kapea – LK
Unlimited Interchange: 14. Connor Jones, 15. Jack Brock, 16. Aidan Day, 17. Will Bugden, 18. Fred Koraba, 19. Troyson Basinni, 20. Nathan Wales.
SP PNG Hunters: ?

=== Intrust Super Cup matches ===
ROUND 1: Intrust Super Cup 2017

Sunday
4 March 2017
18:00 AEST (UTC+10)

Mackay Cutters	4 – 24	Northern Pride
Tries: Nathan Saumalu 1 Goals: 0	Half-time: 0 – 4 Penalties: 6 – 8 ----- Sin Bin: Sheldon Powe-Hobbs; Setaimata Sa. ----- QRL Report	Tries: 1 Jared Allen; 1 Justin Castellaro; 2 Gideon Gela-Mosby*; 1 Ben Spina*; Goals: 2 Khan Ahwang (4 from 4)

BB Print Stadium
(Bridge Road, South Mackay, QLD)
Referee: Tyson Brough.

Sea Swift Northern Pride: 1. Khan Ahwang – FB 2. Gideon Gela-Mosby* – WG 3. Luke George – CE 4. Justin Castellaro – CE 5. Marcus Jensen* – WG 6. Jordan Biondi-Odo – FE 7. Jared Allen – HB 8. Sheldon Powe-Hobbs – PR 9. Ryan Ghietti (c) – HK 10. Will Bugden – PR 11. Graham Clark – SR 12. Patrick Mago* – SR 13. Ben Spina* – LK
Interchange: 14. Connor Jones, 15. Troy Kapea, 16. Darryn Schonig, 17. Nathan Wales.
* = Cowboys allocation (4 players allocated for this match).
Unavailable: Joel Riethmuller (injury), Tom Hancock (injury).
Mackay Cutters: 1. Yamba Bowie, 2. Jack Joass, 3. Setaimata Sa (c), 4. Jordan Pereira, 5. Nathan Saumalu, 6. Nicho Hynes, 7. Cooper Bambling, 8. Braden Hamlin-Uele, 9. Jake Eden, 10. Nick Brown, 11. Isaac Richardson, 12. Johnny Faletagoa'i, 13. Jack Blagbrough.
Interchange: 14. Aaron Booth, 15. Jacob Pottinger, 16. Gareth Moore, 18. Lona Kaifoto.
* = North Queensland Cowboys allocation (? players allocated for this match).
Coach: Steve Sheppard.
- Note: This was the Pride debut for William Bugden, Connor Jones, Darryn Schonig and Troy Kapea (Pride Players 131 & 133–135), and North Queensland Cowboys allocation players Gideon Gela-Mosby*, Marcus Jensen* and Patrick Mago* (Pride Players 129, 130 & 132).

Position	Round 1 - 2017	P	W	D	L	B	For	Against	Diff	Pts
2	Northern Pride	1	1	0	0	0	24	4	+20	2

ROUND 2: Intrust Super Cup 2017

Saturday
11 March 2017
18:00 AEST (UTC+10)

Wynnum-Manly Seagulls	20 – 18	Northern Pride
Tries: Will Brimson 1 Jack Goodsell 1 Daniel Ogden 1 Goals: Travis Burns (3 from 3) 3 Penalty Goals: Travis Burns 1	Half-time: 12 – 0 Penalties: 4 – 7 QRL Report	Tries: 1 Jared Allen; 1 Javid Bowen*; 1 Connor Jones; Goals: 3 Khan Ahwang (3 from 3); Penalty Goals: 0

BMD Kougari Oval
(Manly West, Brisbane, QLD)

Sea Swift Northern Pride: 1. Khan Ahwang – FB 2. Gideon Gela-Mosby* – WG 4. Javid Bowen* – CE 19. Justin Castellaro – CE 5. Marcus Jensen* – WG 6. Jordan Biondi-Odo – FE 7. Jared Allen – HB 8. Sheldon Powe-Hobbs – PR 9. Ryan Ghietti (c) – HK 10. Will Bugden – PR 11. Graham Clark – SR 12. Patrick Mago* – SR 13. Ben Spina* – LK
Interchange: 3. Luke George, 14. Connor Jones, 15. Troy Kapea, 16. Darryn Schonig.
* = Cowboys allocation (4 players allocated for this match).
Unavailable: Joel Riethmuller (injury), Tom Hancock (injury).
Pride Out: Nathan Wales (bench).
Pride In: Javid Bowen*.
Changes: Luke George (centre to bench).
Wynnum-Manly Seagulls: 1. Daniel Ogden, 2. Daniel Wallace, 3. David Mead, 4. Mitch Buckett, 5. Jack Goodsell, 6. Will Brimson, 7. Travis Burns, 8. Aaron Rockley, 9. Jayden Berrell, 10. Ngarima Pita, 11. Alex Barr, 1. Stedman Lefau, 13. Brendon Gibb.
Interchange: 14. Mitchell Frei, 15. Mitch Cronin, 16. Adam Tuimavave-Gerrard, 17. John Te Reo.
* = Brisbane Broncos allocation (? players allocated for this match).
Coach: Adam Brideson.

Position	Round 2 - 2017	P	W	D	L	B	For	Against	Diff	Pts
5	Northern Pride	2	1	0	1	0	42	24	+18	2

ROUND 3: Intrust Super Cup 2017

Saturday
18 March 2017
17:30 AEST (UTC+10)

Northern Pride	10 – 22	SC Falcons
Tries: Khan Ahwang 1 Colin Wilkie 1 Goals: Khan Ahwang (1 from 2) 1 Penalty Goals: 0	Half-time: 4 – 10; Penalties: 10 – 6 QRL Report	Tries: 1 Samuel Wright; 1 Matthew Soper-Lawler; 1 Lachlan Timm; 1 Alex Bishop; Goals: 2 Joe Stimson (2 from 4); Penalty Goals: 1 Joe Stimson

Barlow Park
(Severin Street, Parramatta Park, QLD)
Referee: Liam Kennedy.

Sea Swift Northern Pride: 1. Khan Ahwang – FB 2. Gideon Gela-Mosby* – WG 3. Luke George – CE 4. Justin Castellaro – CE 5. Marcus Jensen* – WG 6. Jordan Biondi-Odo – FE 7. Jared Allen – HB 8. Sheldon Powe-Hobbs – PR 9. Ryan Ghietti (c) – HK 10. Will Bugden – PR 11. Graham Clark – SR 12. Patrick Mago* – SR 13. Troy Kapea – LK
Interchange: 14. Connor Jones, 15. Darryn Schonig, 16. Nathan Wales, 17. Colin Wilkie.
* = Cowboys allocation (3 players allocated for this match).
Pride Out: Javid Bowen* (centre), Ben Spina* (lock).
Pride In: Nathan Wales (bench), Colin Wilkie (bench).
Changes: Luke George (bench to centre), Troy Kapea (bench to lock).
SC Falcons: 1. Eddie Tautali, 2. Matt Soper-Lawler, 3, Jeremy Hawkins, 4. Justin Olam*, 5. Samuel Wright, 15. Jahrome Hughes*, 7. Guy Hamilton, 17. Vincent Leuluai, 9. Jake Turpin, 18. Tui Kamikamica, 11. Dane Hogan (c), 12. Joe Stimson*, 13. Jon Grieve.
Interchange: 6. Alex Bishop, 10. Lachlan Timm*, 14. Brandon Smith, 16. Jye Ballinger.
* = Melbourne Storm allocation (? players allocated for this match).
Coach: Craig Ingebrigtsen.

Position	Round 3 - 2017	P	W	D	L	B	For	Against	Diff	Pts
8	Northern Pride	3	1	0	2	0	52	46	+6	2

ROUND 4: Intrust Super Cup 2017

Sunday
26 March 2017
12:40 AEST (UTC+10)

Easts Tigers	42 – 12	Northern Pride
Tries: Gerrard Mccallum 3 Dean Britt 1 Conor Carey 1 Brodie Croft 1 Matthew Zgrajewski 1 Goals: Billy Walters (7 from 7) 7	Half-time: 30 – 6 Penalties: 1 – 5 ----- Sin bin: Jared Allen ----- QRL Report	Tries: 2 Khan Ahwang Goals: 2 Khan Ahwang (2 from 2)

Totally Workwear Stadium
(Stones Corner, Brisbane, QLD)
Referee: Nick Morel, Tyson Brough.

Sea Swift Northern Pride: 1. Khan Ahwang – FB 2. Bradley Stephen – WG 3. Luke George – CE 4. Justin Castellaro – CE 5. Marcus Jensen* – WG 6. Jordan Biondi-Odo – FE 7. Jared Allen – HB 8. Sheldon Powe-Hobbs – PR 9. Ryan Ghietti (c) – HK 10. Will Bugden – PR 11. Graham Clark – SR 12. Patrick Mago* – SR 13. Troy Kapea – LK
Interchange: 14. Connor Jones, 15. Darryn Schonig, 17. Colin Wilkie, 19. Ben Spina*.
* = Cowboys allocation (3 players allocated for this match).
Pride Out: Gideon Gela-Mosby* (wing), Nathan Wales (bench).
Pride In: Bradley Stephen (wing), Ben Spina* (bench).
Eastern Suburbs Tigers: 1. Gerrard Mccallum, 2. Jarrod Mcinally, 3. Shane Neumann, 4. Conor Carey, 5. Linc Port, 6. Billy Walters, 7. Brodie Croft, 8. Steve Thorpe, 9. Tom Butterfield, 10. Matthew Zgrajewski, 11. Jake Foster (c), 12. Dean Britt, 13. Jack Svendsen.
Interchange: 14. David Murphy, 15. Charlie Galo, 16. Luke Lavelle, 17. Adam Crear.
* = Melbourne Storm allocation (? players allocated for this match).
Coach: Scott Sipple.
- Note: Justin Castellaro's 50th Queensland Cup game for the Pride.

Position	Round 4 - 2017	P	W	D	L	B	For	Against	Diff	Pts
11	Northern Pride	4	1	0	3	0	64	88	-24	2

ROUND 5: Intrust Super Cup 2017

Saturday
1 April 2017
17:30 AEST (UTC+10)

Northern Pride	18 – 6	Burleigh Bears
Tries: Khan Ahwang 1 Justin Castellaro 1 Goals: Khan Ahwang (3 from 3) 3	Half-time: 12 – 6 Penalties: 7 – 5 QRL Report	Tries: 1 Sami Sauiluma Goals: 1 Keanu Te Kiri (1 from 1)

Barlow Park
(Severin Street, Parramatta Park, QLD)
Referee: Ben Watts.

Sea Swift Northern Pride: 1. Khan Ahwang – FB 2. Luke George – WG 3. Bradley Stephen – CE 4. Justin Castellaro – CE 5. Marcus Jensen* – WG 6. Jared Allen – FE 7. Ryan Ghietti (c) – HB 10. Will Bugden – PR 14. Jordan Biondi-Odo – HK 13. Ben Spina* – PR 11. Graham Clark – SR 12. Patrick Mago* – SR 18. Colin Wilkie – LK
Interchange: 8. Sheldon Powe-Hobbs, 9. Connor Jones, 16. Darryn Schonig, 19. Joel Riethmuller.
* = Cowboys allocation (2 players allocated for this match).
Pride Out: Troy Kapea (lock).
Pride In: Joel Riethmuller (bench).
Changes: Bradley Stephen (wing to centre), Luke George (centre to wing), Jordan Biondi-Odo (five-eighth to hooker), Jared Allen (halfback to five-eighth), Sheldon Powe-Hobbs (front row to bench), Ryan Ghietti (hooker to halfback), Colin Wilkie (bench to lock), Ben Spina* (bench to front row)
Burleigh Bears: 1. Kurtis Rowe, 2. Henare Wells, 3. Sami Sauiluma, 4. Connor Broadhurst, 5. Oliver Regan, 6. Keanu Te Kiri, 7. Tyler Cornish, 8. Luke Page (c), 9. Sam Coster, 10. Paterika Vaivai, 11. Jamie Dowling, 12. Dylan Kelly, 13. Lorenzo Ma'afu.
Interchange: 14. Chris Law, 15. Parahi Wilson, 16. Matthew White, 19. Darren Griffiths.
* = Gold Coast Titans allocation (? players allocated for this match).
Coach: Jim Lenihan.

Position	Round 5 - 2017	P	W	D	L	B	For	Against	Diff	Pts
9	Northern Pride	5	2	0	3	0	82	94	-12	4

ROUND 6: Intrust Super Cup 2017

Saturday
8 April 2017
17:30 AEST (UTC+10)

Northern Pride	18 – 28	Townsville Blackhawks
Tries: Graham Clark 1 Patrick Mago* 1 Jordan Biondi-Odo 1 Goals: Khan Ahwang (3 from 3) 3	Half-time: 6 – 16; Penalties: 8 – 8 QRL Report	Tries: 1 Temone Power; 1 Jordan Kenworthy; 1 Jonathon Reuben; 1 Samsen O'Neill; 1 Michael Parker-Walshe; Goals: 4 Carlin Anderson (4 from 5)

Barlow Park
(Severin Street, Parramatta Park, QLD)
Referee: Jarrod Cole

Sea Swift Northern Pride: 6. Jared Allen – FB 2. Khan Ahwang – WG 3. Bradley Stephen – CE 4. Justin Castellaro – CE 5. Marcus Jensen* – WG 14. Jordan Biondi-Odo – FE 7. Ryan Ghietti (c) – HB 10. Will Bugden – PR 18. Colin Wilkie – HK 16. Darryn Schonig – PR 11. Graham Clark – SR 12. Patrick Mago* – SR 17. Joel Riethmuller – LK
Interchange: 8. Sheldon Powe-Hobbs, 9. Connor Jones, 15. Troy Kapea, 19. Aiden Day.
* = Cowboys allocation (2 players allocated for this match).
Pride Out: Luke George (wing), Ben Spina* (front row).
Pride In: Troy Kapea (bench), Aidan Day (bench).
Changes: Khan Ahwang (fullback to wing), Jared Allen (five-eighth to fullback), Jordan Biondi-Odo (hooker to five-eighth), Colin Wilkie (lock to hooker), Darryn Schonig (bench to front row), Joel Riethmuller (bench to lock).
Townsville and District Mendi Blackhawks: : 1. Carlin Anderson, 2. Samsen O'neill, 3. Temone Power, 4. Ty Carucci, 5. Jonathon Reuben, 14. Kierran Moseley, 7. Michael Parker-Walshe, 8. Samuel Hoare, 9. Anthony Mitchell, 10. Corey Jensen, 11. Jordan Kenworthy, 12. Andrew Niemoeller, 13. Dan Beasley (c).
Interchange: 15. Kieran Quabba, 16. David Munro, 19. Sam Foster, 22. Oshae Tuiasau.
* = North Queensland Cowboys allocation (? players allocated for this match).
Coach: Kristian Woolf.

Position	Round 6 - 2017	P	W	D	L	B	For	Against	Diff	Pts
10	Northern Pride	6	2	0	4	0	100	122	-22	4

ROUND 7: Intrust Super Cup 2017

Saturday
15 April 2017
17:30 AEST (UTC+10)

Northern Pride	10 – 24	Ipswich Jets
Tries: Jordan Biondi-Odo 1 Kienan Grogan-Hayes 1 Goals: Khan Ahwang (1 from 2) 1	Half-time: 4 – 12; Penalties: 10 – 7 QRL Report	Tries: 1 Nathaniel Neale; 1 Sam Martin; 1 Richard Pandia; Goals: 4 Wes Conlon (4 from 5)

Barlow Park
(Severin Street, Parramatta Park, QLD)
Referee: Tim Rutherford.

Sea Swift Northern Pride: 1. Khan Ahwang – FB 19. Kienan Grogan-Hayes – WG 3. Bradley Stephen – CE 4. Luke George – CE 5. Marcus Jensen* – WG 6. Jordan Biondi-Odo – FE 7. Jared Allen – HB 17. Darryn Schonig – PR 9. Ryan Ghietti (c) – HK 10. Will Bugden – PR 11. Graham Clark – SR 12. Patrick Mago* – SR 13. Joel Riethmuller – LK
Interchange: 8. Sheldon Powe-Hobbs, 14. Colin Wilkie, 15. Troy Kapea, 20. Connor Jones.
* = Cowboys allocation (2 players allocated for this match).
Unavailable: Justin Castellaro (ribs).
Pride Out: Justin Castellaro (centre), Aidan Day (bench).
Pride In: Kienan Grogan-Hayes (wing), Luke George (centre).
Changes: Jared Allen (fullback to halfback), Khan Ahwang (wing to fullback), Ryan Ghietti (halfback to hooker), Colin Wilkie (hooker to bench)
Ipswich Jets: 1. Wes Conlon, 2. Michael Purcell, 3. Ben White, 4. Nemani Valekapa, 5. Richard Pandia, 6. Chris Ash, 7. Dane Phillips (c), 8. Mitch Carpenter, 9. Mikaere Beattie, 10. Nathaniel Neale, 13. Rory Humphreys, 12. Sebastian Pandia, 22. Tyson Lofipo.
Interchange: 11. Sam Martin, 14. Luke Capewell, 16. Fakahoko Teutau, 21. Nathan Gaulton.
* = Brisbane Broncos allocation (? players allocated for this match).
Coaches: Ben Walker and Shane Walker.
- Note: This was the Pride debut for 18-year-old Kienan Grogan-Hayes (Pride Player 138).

Position	Round 7 - 2017	P	W	D	L	B	For	Against	Diff	Pts
11	Northern Pride	7	2	0	5	0	110	146	-36	4

ROUND 8: Intrust Super Cup 2017

Sunday
23 April 2017
15:00 AEST (UTC+10)

Norths Devils	20 – 22	Northern Pride
Tries: Dalton Phillips 1 Javarn White 1 Billy Brittain 1 Goals: Todd Murphy (1 from 1) 1 Chris Sandow (2 from 2) 2 Penalty Goals; Todd Murphy 1	Half-time: 8 – 10; Penalties: 3 – 9 QRL Report	Tries: 1 Gideon Gela-Mosby*; 1 Darryn Schonig; 1 Bradley Stephen; 1 Joel Riethmuller; Goals: 1 Bradley Stephen (1 from 2); 2 Jordan Biondi-Odo (2 from 2); Penalty Goals; 0

Albert Bishop Park
(Hedley Avenue, Nundah QLD)
Referee: Tyson Brough, Chris Anderson.

Sea Swift Northern Pride: 1. Jared Allen – FB 2. Gideon Gela-Mosby* – WG 3. Bradley Stephen – CE 4. Javid Bowen* – CE 5. Marcus Jensen* – WG 6. Jordan Biondi-Odo – FE 7. Ryan Ghietti (c) – HB 8. Sheldon Powe-Hobbs – PR 14. Colin Wilkie – HK 10. Will Bugden – PR 11. Graham Clark – SR 12. Tom Hancock – SR 13. Joel Riethmuller – LK
Interchange: 9. Ben Hampton*, 15. Troy Kapea, 16. Patrick Mago*, 17. Darryn Schonig.
* = Cowboys allocation (5 players allocated for this match).
Unavailable: Justin Castellaro (rib), Bradley Stephen (dislocated shoulder), Javid Bowen* (dislocated shoulder).
Pride Out: Khan Ahwang (fullback), Kienan Grogan-Hayes (wing) (dropped when Ben Hampton* came back from the Cowboys, Luke George (centre), Connor Jones (bench).
Pride In: Gideon Gela-Mosby* (wing), Javid Bowen* (centre), Tom Hancock (second row), Ben Hampton* (bench).
Changes: Jared Allen (halfback to fullback), Darryn Schonig (front row to bench), Ryan Ghietti (hooker to halfback), Patrick Mago* (second row to bench), Sheldon Powe-Hobbs (bench to front row), Colin Wilkie (bench to hooker).
Northern Suburbs Devils: 1. Javarn White, 2. Michael Lucas, 3. Delouise Hoeter, 4. Luke Pollock, 5. Dane Chang, 6. Danny Kerr, 7. Todd Murphy, 8. Francis Molo, 9. Billy Brittain, 10. James Taylor, 11. Jarryd Dodd, 12. Matiu Love-Henry, 13. Dalton Phillips.
Interchange: 14. Chris Sandow, 15. Stephen Coombe, 16. Michael Pearsall, 17. Tama Koopu.
* = Brisbane Broncos allocation (? players allocated for this match)
Coach: Mark Gliddon.
- Note: This was the Pride debut for North Queensland Cowboys allocation player Ben Hampton* (Pride Player 136).

Position	Round 8 - 2017	P	W	D	L	B	For	Against	Diff	Pts
11	Northern Pride	8	3	0	5	0	132	166	-34	6

ROUND 9: Intrust Super Cup 2017

Saturday
29 April 2017
15:00 PNG Pacific Time (UTC+10)

PNG Hunters	26 – 10	Northern Pride
Tries: Willie Minoga 2 Ase Boas 1 Wartovo Puara 1 Goals: Ase Boas (3 from 4) 3 Penalty Goals: Ase Boas 2	Half-time: 10 – 0 Penalties: 7 – 6 QRL Report	Tries: 1 Marcus Jensen; 1 Colin Wilkie Goals: 1 Jordan Biondi-Odo (1 from 2); Penalty Goals: 0

Oil Search National Football Stadium
(Port Moresby, PNG)
Referee: Michael Gordon.

Sea Swift Northern Pride: 1. Jared Allen – FB 2. Gideon Gela-Mosby* – WG 3. Graham Clark – CE 4. Luke George – CE 5. Marcus Jensen* – WG 6. Jordan Biondi-Odo – FE 7. Ryan Ghietti (c) – HB 8. Darryn Schonig – PR 14. Colin Wilkie – HK 10. Will Bugden – PR 11. Tom Hancock – SR 12. Patrick Mago* – SR 13. Joel Riethmuller – LK
Interchange: 14. Connor Jones, 15. Troy Kapea, 16. Nathan Wales, 17. Aidan Day.
* = Cowboys allocation (3 players allocated for this match).
Unavailable: Justin Castellaro (rib), Bradley Stephen (dislocated shoulder).
Pride Out: Bradley Stephen (centre), Javid Bowen* (centre), Sheldon Powe-Hobbs (front row), Ben Hampton (bench).
Pride In: Luke George (centre), Connor Jones (bench), Nathan Wales (bench), Aidan Day (bench).
Changes: Graham Clark (second row to centre), Patrick Mago* (bench to second row), Darryn Schonig (bench to front row).
SP PNG Hunters: 1. Stargroth Amean, 2. Oti Bland, 3. Israel Eliab, 4. Willie Minoga, 5. Paul Wawa, 6. Ase Boas (c), 7. Watson Boas, 8. Henry Noki, 9. Wartovo Puara, 10. Stanton Albert, 11. Nixon Putt, 12. David Loko, 13. Wellington Albert.
Interchange: 14. Enock Maki, 15. Butler Morris, 16. Moses Meninga, 17. Rhadley Brawa.
Coach: Michael Marum.

Position	Round 9 - 2017	P	W	D	L	B	For	Against	Diff	Pts
11	Northern Pride	9	3	0	6	0	142	192	-50	6

ROUND 10: Intrust Super Cup 2017

Saturday
19 May 2017
17:30 AEST (UTC+10)

Northern Pride	6 – 4	Tweed Heads Seagulls
Tries: Jordan Biondi-Odo 1 Goals: Khan Ahwang (1 from 1) 1	Half-time: 6 – 0 Penalties: 7 – 7 QRL Report	Tries: 1 Peter Lee; Goals: 0

Barlow Park
(Severin Street, Parramatta Park, QLD)
Referee: Tyson Brough

Sea Swift Northern Pride: 1. Jared Allen – FB 2. Matthew Musumeci – WG 3. Gideon Gela-Mosby* – CE 4. Khan Ahwang – CE 5. Marcus Jensen* – WG 6. Jordan Biondi-Odo – FE 7. Ryan Ghietti (c) – HB 8. Darryn Schonig – PR 9. Colin Wilkie – HK 10. Will Bugden – PR 11. Tom Hancock – SR 12. Graham Clark – SR 13. Joel Riethmuller – LK
Interchange: 14. Connor Jones, 15. Troy Kapea, 16. Patrick Mago*, 17. Aidan Day.
* = Cowboys allocation (3 players allocated for this match).
Unavailable: Bradley Stephen (dislocated shoulder).
Pride Out: Luke George, Nathan Wales.
Pride In: Matthew Musumeci, Khan Ahwang.
Tweed Heads Seagulls: : 1. Brayden Mcgrady, 14. Tevita Folau, 3. James Wood, 4. John Olive, 5. Peter Lee, 6. Lindon Mcgrady, 7. Michael Burgess, 16. Carne Doyle-Manga, 9. Sam Meskell (c), 10. Ben Nakubuwai, 11. Lamar Liolevave, 22. Eddy Pettybourne, 13. Sam Saville.
Interchange: 8. Shane Gillham, 15. Nick Harrold, 17. Will Johnstone, 19. Kurt Bernard.
* = Gold Coast Titans allocation (? players allocated for this match)
Coach: Aaron Zimmerle.
- Note: This was the Pride debut for Matthew Musumeci (Pride Player 137).

Position	Round 10 - 2017	P	W	D	L	B	For	Against	Diff	Pts
10	Northern Pride	10	4	0	6	0	148	196	-48	8

ROUND 11: Intrust Super Cup 2017

Sunday
21 May 2017
14:00 AEST (UTC+10)

Souths Logan Magpies	42 – 28	Northern Pride
Tries: Scott Doyle 2 Jamayne Isaako 2 Lenny Magey 1 Simione Fatafehi 1 Cameron Booth 1 Goals: Jamayne Isaako (7 from 7) 7	Half-time: 24 – 16; Penalties: 8 – 5 QRL Report	Tries: 1 Matthew Musumeci; 1 Will Bugden; 1 Graham Clark; 1 Marcus Jensen; 1 Connor Jones; Goals: 4 Khan Ahwang (4 from 5)

Davies Park
(West End, Brisbane, QLD)
Referee: Ethan Menchin, Jarrod Cole.

Sea Swift Northern Pride: 1. Khan Ahwang – FB 2. Matthew Musumeci – WG 3. Javid Bowen* – CE 4. Justin Castellaro – CE 5. Marcus Jensen* – WG 6. Jordan Biondi-Odo – FE 7. Ryan Ghietti (c) – HB 8. Darryn Schonig – PR 9. Colin Wilkie – HK 10. Will Bugden – PR 11. Tom Hancock – SR 12. Graham Clark – SR 13. Patrick Mago* – LK
Interchange: 14. Connor Jones, 15. Troy Kapea, 16. Jack Brock, 17. Aidan Day.
* = Cowboys allocation (3 players allocated for this match).
Pride Out: Jared Allen (fullback), Gideon Gela-Mosby* (centre), Joel Riethmuller (lock).
Pride In: Javid Bowen* (centre), Justin Castellaro (centre), Jack Brock (bench).
Changes: Khan Ahwang (centre to fullback), Patrick Mago* (bench to lock).
Southern Suburbs Magpies : 1. Jamayne Isaako, 2. Cameron Booth, 3. Lenny Magey, 4. Scott Doyle, 5. Luke Archer, 6. Matt Minto, 7. Connor Toia, 8. Aj Tuimavave, 9. Travis Waddell, 10. Phil Dennis, 11. Simi Fatafehi, 12. Jaydn Su'a, 13. Joe Boyce.
Interchange: 10. Sam Lavea, 14. Jordan Scott, 16. Jack Anderson, 17. George Fai.
* = Brisbane Broncos allocation (? players allocated for this match)
Coach: Jon Buchanan.
- Note: This was the Pride debut for Jack Brock (Pride Player 140).

Position	Round 11 - 2017	P	W	D	L	B	For	Against	Diff	Pts
10	Northern Pride	11	4	0	7	0	176	238	-62	8

ROUND 12: Intrust Super Cup 2017

Saturday
27 May 2017
19:00 AEST (UTC+10)

CQ Capras	10 – 4	Northern Pride
Tries: Ken Tofilau 1 Justin Tavae 1 'Goals: Cody Grills (1 from 2) 1	Half-time: 10 – 4 Penalties: 4 – 4 QRL Report	Tries: 1 Marcus Jensen Goals: 0

Marley Brown Oval
(Clinton, Gladstone, QLD)
Referee: Nick Morel.

Sea Swift Northern Pride: 1. Khan Ahwang – FB 2. Matthew Musumeci – WG 3. Bradley Stephen – CE 4. Justin Castellaro – CE 5. Marcus Jensen* – WG 6. Jordan Biondi-Odo – FE 7. Ryan Ghietti (c) – HB 8. Darryn Schonig – PR 9. Colin Wilkie – HK 10. Will Bugden – PR 11. Graham Clark – SR 12. Tom Hancock – SR 13. Patrick Mago* – LK
Interchange: 14. Ben Hampton*, 15. Troy Kapea, 16. Keelan White, 17. Sheldon Powe-Hobbs.
* = Cowboys allocation (3 players allocated for this match).
Pride Out: Javid Bowen* (centre), Connor Jones (bench), Jack Brock (bench), Aidan Day (bench).
Pride In: Bradley Stephen (centre), Ben Hampton* (bench), Keelan White (bench), Sheldon Powe-Hobbs (bench).
CQ Capras: : 6. Reece Baker, 2. Ken Tofilau, 3. Justin Tavae, 4. Nathan Bassani, 5. Chanel Seigafo, 19. Cody Grills, 7. Jack Madden, 8. Matt Groat, 9. Krys Freeman, 10. Oliver Percy, 11. Marco Delapena, 15. Bill Cullen, 13. Gavin Hiscox.
Interchange: 1. Maipele Morseu, 12. Guy Williams (c), 16. Jack Kavanagh, 17. Liam Pickersgill.
* = Gold Coast Titans allocation (? players allocated for this match).
Coach: Kim Williams.

Position	Round 12 - 2017	P	W	D	L	B	For	Against	Diff	Pts
11	Northern Pride	12	4	0	8	0	180	248	-68	8

ROUND 13: Intrust Super Cup 2017

Saturday
3 June 2017
17:30 AEST (UTC+10)

Northern Pride	28 – 32	Easts Tigers
Tries: Darryn Schonig 1 Khan Ahwang 1 Keelan White 1 Gideon Gela-Mosby* 1 Troy Kapea 1 Goals: Khan Ahwang (4 from 5) 4	Half-time: 6 – 18; Penalties: 8 – 6 QRL Report	Tries: 1 Billy Walters; 1 Jake Foster; 1 Shane Neumann; 1 Jarrod McInally; 1 Billy Walters; 1 Jarrod McInally; Goals: 4 Adam Crear (4 from 6)

Barlow Park
(Severin Street, Parramatta Park, QLD)
Referee: Liam Kennedy

Sea Swift Northern Pride: 1. Bradley Stephen – FB 2. Gideon Gela-Mosby* – WG 3. Khan Ahwang – CE 4. Justin Castellaro – CE 19. Luke George – WG 6. Jordan Biondi-Odo – FE 7. Jared Allen – HB 10. Will Bugden – PR 9. Ryan Ghietti (c) – HK 15. Troy Kapea – PR 11. Tom Hancock – SR 12. Graham Clark – SR 13. Patrick Mago* – LK
Interchange: 8. Sheldon Powe-Hobbs 14. Colin Wilkie 16. Keelan White 17. Darryn Schonig
* = Cowboys allocation (2 players allocated for this match).
Pride Out: Matthew Musumeci (wing), Marcus Jensen* (wing), Ben Hampton* (bench).
Pride In: Gideon Gela-Mosby* (wing), Luke George (wing), Jared Allen (halfback).
Changes: Khan Ahwang (fullback to centre), Bradley Stephen (centre to fullback), Ryan Ghietti (c) (halfback to hooker), Darryn Schonig (front row to bench), Colin Wilkie (hooker to bench), Troy Kapea (bench to front row).
Eastern Suburbs Tigers: 1. Gerrard Mccallum, 2. Linc Port, 3. Shane Neumann, 4. Curtis Scott, 5. Jarrod Mcinally, 6. Billy Walters, 17. Young Tonumaipea, 8. Mark Nicholls, 9. Tom Butterfield, 10. Matthew Zgrajewski, 11. Jake Foster (c), 12. Dean Britt, 13. Adam Crear.
Interchange: 7. Chris Ostwald, 14. David Murphy, 15. Liufau Hala, 16. Jack Svendsen.
* = Melbourne Storm allocation (? players allocated for this match).
Coach: Scott Sipple.

Position	Round 13 - 2017	P	W	D	L	B	For	Against	Diff	Pts
12	Northern Pride	13	4	0	9	0	208	280	-72	8

ROUND 14: Intrust Super Cup 2017

Sunday
11 June 2017
13:40 AEST (UTC+10)

SC Falcons	37 – 16	Northern Pride
Tries: Guy Hamilton 2 Justin Olam 1 Alex Copelin 1 Justin Olam 1 Jye Ballinger 1 Goals: Guy Hamilton (5 from 6) 5	Half-time: 18 – 6 Penalties: 6 – 8 Sin Bin: Chris Lewis. QRL Report	Tries: 1 Bradley Stephen; 1 Khan Ahwang; 1 Gideon Gela-Mosby* Goals: 2 Khan Ahwang (2 from 3)

Sunshine Coast Stadium
(Sportsmans Parade, Bokarina, Kawana Waters, QLD)
Referee: Nick Pelgrave, Jarrod Cole

Sea Swift Northern Pride: 1. Bradley Stephen – FB 2. Gideon Gela-Mosby* – WG 3. Javid Bowen* – CE 4. Justin Castellaro – CE 5. Khan Ahwang – WG 6. Jordan Biondi-Odo – FE 7. Jared Allen – HB 10. Will Bugden – PR 9. Ryan Ghietti (c) – HK 15. Troy Kapea – PR 11. Tom Hancock – SR 12. Graham Clark – SR 13. Patrick Mago* – LK
Interchange: 8. Sheldon Powe-Hobbs, 14. Colin Wilkie, 17. Darryn Schonig, 19. Joel Riethmuller.
* = Cowboys allocation (3 players allocated for this match).
Pride Out: Luke George (wing), Keelan White (bench).
Pride In: Javid Bowen* (centre), Joel Riethmuller (bench).
Changes: Khan Ahwang (centre to wing).
SC Falcons: 1. Matt Soper-Lawler, 2. Donald Malone, 3. Jye Ballinger; 4. Justin Olam, 5. Alex Copelin, 6. Dan Murphy, 7. Guy Hamilton, 18 Tui Kamikamica, 9. Alex Bishop, 10 Vincent Leuluai, 11. Dane Hogan (c), 12. Chris Lewis, 13. Jon Grieve.
Interchange: 17 Lachlan Timm, 19. Liam Mcdonald, 21. Christian Morris, 22. Harrison Muller.
* = Melbourne Storm allocation (? players allocated for this match).
Coach: Craig Ingebrigtsen.

Position	Round 14 - 2017	P	W	D	L	B	For	Against	Diff	Pts
12	Northern Pride	14	4	0	10	0	224	317	-93	8

ROUND 15: Intrust Super Cup 2017

17–18 June 2017.

Northern Pride	BYE

Position	Round 17 - 2016	P	W	D	L	B	For	Against	Diff	Pts
12	Northern Pride	14	4	0	10	1	224	317	-93	10

ROUND 16: Intrust Super Cup 2017

Saturday
24 June 2017
17:35 AEST (UTC+10)

Northern Pride	14 – 18	PNG Hunters
Tries: Connor Jones 1 Sheldon Powe-Hobbs 1 Goals: Jordan Biondi-Odo (2 from 2) 2 Penalty Goal: Jordan Biondi-Odo 1	Half-time: 12 – 4 Penalties: 6 – 6 QRL Report	Tries: 1 Wartovo Puara; 1 Bland Abavu; 1 Israel Eliab; Goals: 2 Ase Boas (2 from 3); Penalty Goal: 1 Ase Boas

Barlow Park
(Severin Street, Parramatta Park, QLD)
Referee: Michael Gordon

Sea Swift Northern Pride: 1. Bradley Stephen – FB 2. Gideon Gela-Mosby* – WG 3. Javid Bowen* – CE 4. Justin Castellaro – CE 5. Marcus Jensen* – WG 6. Jordan Biondi-Odo – FE 14. Ryan Ghietti (c) – HB 8. Sheldon Powe-Hobbs – PR 9. Connor Jones – HK 10. Will Bugden – PR 11. Nathan Wales – SR 12. Graham Clark – SR 13. Patrick Mago* – LK
Interchange: 15. Troy Kapea, 16. Tom Hancock, 17. Darryn Schonig, 18. Colin Wilkie.
* = Cowboys allocation (4 players allocated for this match).
Pride Out: Khan Ahwang (wing), Jared Allen (halfback), Joel Riethmuller (bench).
Pride In: Marcus Jensen* (wing), Connor Jones (hooker), Nathan Wales (second row).
Changes: Troy Kapea (front row to bench), Ryan Ghietti (hooker to halfback), Tom Hancock (second row to bench), Sheldon Powe-Hobbs (bench to front row).
SP PNG Hunters: 2. Oti Bland Tony, 18. Karo Kauna, 3. Israel Eliab, 4. Adex Wera, 5. Paul Wawa, 6. Ase Boas, 7. Watson Boas, 8. Muka Peter Kalu, 9. Wartovo Puara Jr, 10. Esau Siune, 11. Nixon Putt, 12. Rhadley Brawa, 13. Stanton Albert.
Interchange: 14. Silas Gahuna, 15. Willie Minoga, 16. Lawrence Tu'u, 17. Brandy Peter.
Coach: Michael Marum.

Position	Round 16 - 2017	P	W	D	L	B	For	Against	Diff	Pts
13	Northern Pride	15	4	0	1	1	238	335	-97	10

ROUND 17: Intrust Super Cup 2017

Sunday
2 July 2017
13:40 AEST (UTC+10)

Northern Pride	18 – 26	Mackay Cutters
Tries: Nathan Wales 1 Kienan Grogan-Hayes 1 Graham Clark 1 Shawn Bowen 1 Goals: Bradley Stephen (1 from 4) 1	Half-time: 4 – 18; Penalties: 8 – 6 QRL Report	Tries: 2 Yamba Bowie; 1 Cooper Bambling; 1 Aaron Booth Goals: 4 Jack Joass (4 from 4); Penalty Goal: 1 Jack Joass

Barlow Park
(Severin Street, Parramatta Park, QLD)
Referee: Nick Pelgrave, Jarrod Cole.

Sea Swift Northern Pride: 1. Kienan Grogan-Hayes – FB 2. Shawn Bowen – WG 3. Gideon Gela-Mosby* – CE 4. Bradley Stephen – CE 5. Marcus Jensen* – WG 6. Jordan Biondi-Odo – FE 7. Ryan Ghietti (c) – HB 8. Sheldon Powe-Hobbs – PR 9. Connor Jones – HK 10. Will Bugden – PR 11. Nathan Wales – SR 12. Graham Clark – SR 13. Patrick Mago* – LK
Interchange: 14. Colin Wilkie, 15. Troy Kapea, 16. Tom Hancock, 17. Darryn Schonig.
* = Cowboys allocation (4 players allocated for this match).
Pride Out: Javid Bowen* (centre), Justin Castellaro (centre).
Pride In: Kienan Grogan-Hayes (fullback), Shawn Bowen (wing).
Changes: Bradley Stephen (fullback to centre), Gideon Gela-Mosby* (wing to centre).
Mackay Cutters: 1. Jack Joass, 2. Yamba Bowie, 3. Kell Jenner; 4. Semisi Tyrell, 5. Johnny Faletagoa'I, 6. Nicho Hynes, 7. Cooper Bambling, 8. Braden Hamlin-Uele*, 9. Aaron Booth, 17. Leonati Feiloakitua, 11. Bennett Leslie, 12. Setaimata Sa, 13. Tom Murphy (c).
Interchange: 10. Nick Brown, 14. Jacob Pottinger, 16. Kouma Samson, 18. Jack Blagbrough.
* = North Queensland Cowboys allocation (? players allocated for this match)
Coach: Steve Sheppard.
- Note: This was the Pride debut for Shawn Bowen (Pride Player 141).

Position	Round 17 - 2017	P	W	D	L	B	For	Against	Diff	Pts
13	Northern Pride	16	4	0	12	1	256	361	-105	10

ROUND 18: Intrust Super Cup 2017

Saturday
8 July 2017
17:30 AEST (UTC+10)

Northern Pride	14 – 30	Norths Devils
Tries: Sheldon Powe-Hobbs 1 Shawn Bowen 1 Marcus Jensen* 1 Goals: Jordan Biondi-Odo (1 from 3) 1 Penalty Goals:	Half-time: 10 – 14; Penalties: 6 – 7 QRL Report	Tries: 1 Jai Arrow; 1 Matiu Love-Henry; 1 Delouise Hoeter; 1 Jarryd Dodd; Goals: 4 Hayden (4 from 4); Penalty Goals: 3 Hayden (3 from 3)

Barlow Park
(Severin Street, Parramatta Park, QLD)
Referee: Tim Rutherford

Sea Swift Northern Pride: 1. Kienan Grogan-Hayes – FB 2. Shawn Bowen – WG 3. Javid Bowen* – CE 4. Bradley Stephen – CE 5. Marcus Jensen* – WG 6. Jordan Biondi-Odo – FE 7. Ryan Ghietti (c) – HB 8. Sheldon Powe-Hobbs – PR 14. Colin Wilkie – HK 16. Tom Hancock – PR 11. Nathan Wales – SR 12. Graham Clark – SR 13. Patrick Mago* – LK
Interchange: 9. Connor Jones, 10. Darryn Schonig, 15. Troy Kapea, 19. Keelan White.
* = Cowboys allocation (3 players allocated for this match).
Pride Out: Gideon Gela-Mosby* (centre), Will Bugden (front row).
Pride In: Javid Bowen* (centre), Keelan White (bench).
Changes: Connor Jones (hooker to bench), Colin Wilkie (bench to hooker), Tom Hancock (bench to front row).
Northern Suburbs Devils: 1. Javarn White, 2. Michael Lucas, 3. Delouise Hoeter, 4. Luke Pollock, 5. Dane Chang, 6. Hayden Lipp, 7. Gary Riccardi, 8. Darcy Maroske, 9. Billy Brittain, 10. John Palavi, 11. David Faamita, 12. Matiu Love-Henry, 13. Jai Arrow.
* = Brisbane Broncos allocation (? players allocated for this match).

Position	Round 18 - 2017	P	W	D	L	B	For	Against	Diff	Pts
13	Northern Pride	17	4	0	15	1	270	391	-121	10

ROUND 19: Intrust Super Cup 2017

Saturday
15 July 2017
18:00 AEST (UTC+10)

Townsville Blackhawks	32 – 10	Northern Pride
Tries: Jordan Drew 1 Temone Power 1 Carlin Anderson 1 Kyle Laybutt 1 Kierran Moseley 1 Jordan Kenworthy 1 Goals: Carlin Anderson (4 from 6) 4	Half-time: 6 – 0 Penalties: 10 – 9 QRL Report	Tries: 1 Marcus Jensen; 1 Troy Kapea Goals: 1 Jordan Biondi-Odo (1 from 2)

Jack Manski Oval
(Golf Links Drive, Kirwan, QLD)
Referee: Belinda Sharpe

Sea Swift Northern Pride: 1. Kienan Grogan-Hayes – FB 2. Gideon Gela-Mosby* – WG 3. Javid Bowen* – CE 20. Shawn Bowen – CE 5. Marcus Jensen* – WG 6. Jordan Biondi-Odo – FE 7. Jared Allen – HB 8. Sheldon Powe-Hobbs – PR 14. Colin Wilkie – HK 10. Darryn Schonig – PR 11. Nathan Wales – SR 12. Tom Hancock – SR 13. Graham Clark – LK
Interchange: 9. Ryan Ghietti (c) 15. Troy Kapea, 17. Jack Brock, 19. Keelan White.
* = Cowboys allocation (x players allocated for this match).
Pride Out: Bradley Stephen (centre), Patrick Mago* (lock), Connor Jones (bench).
Pride In: Gideon Gela-Mosby* (wing), Jared Allen (halfback), Jack Brock (bench).
Changes: Shawn Bowen (wing to centre), Ryan Ghietti (halfback to bench), Tom Hancock (front row to second row), Graham Clark (second row to lock), Darryn Schonig (bench to front row).
Townsville and District Mendi Blackhawks: 1. Carlin Anderson, 2. Ty Carucci, 3. Jordan Drew, 4. Davin Crampton, 5. Jonathon Reuben, 14. Kierran Moseley, 7. Kyle Laybutt, 8. Francis Molo, 9. Anthony Mitchell (c), 22. Oshae Tuiasau, 11. Blake Leary, 12. Andrew Niemoeller, 13. Jordan Kenworthy.
* = North Queensland Cowboys allocation (? players allocated for this match).
Coach: Kristian Woolf.

Position	Round 19 - 2017	P	W	D	L	B	For	Against	Diff	Pts
13	Northern Pride	18	4	0	14	1	280	423	-143	10

ROUND 20: Intrust Super Cup 2017 - Country Week

Saturday
22 July 2017
15:00 AEST (UTC+10)

Wynnum Manly Seagulls	16 – 40	Northern Pride
Tries: Shaun Nona 1 Daniel Ogden 1 Peter Gubb 1 Goals: Paora Kemp (2 from 3) 2 Penalty Goal: 0	Half-time: 4 – 24; Penalties: 4 – 6 QRL Report	Tries: 2 Bradley Stephen; 1 Jared Allen; 1 Shawn Bowen; 1 Marcus Jensen; 1 Patrick Mago*; 1 Gideon Gela-Mosby*; Goals: 5 Jordan Biondi-Odo (5 from 7); Penalty Goal: 1 Jordan Biondi-Odo

Yusia Ginau Oval
(Bamaga, Cape York, QLD)
Referee: Chris Anderson

Sea Swift Northern Pride: 1. Matthew Musumeci – FB 3. Gideon Gela-Mosby* – WG 2. Shawn Bowen – CE 4. Bradley Stephen – CE 5. Marcus Jensen* – WG 6. Jordan Biondi-Odo – FE 7. Jared Allen – HB 8. Sheldon Powe-Hobbs – PR 9. Ryan Ghietti (c) – HK 10. Darryn Schonig – PR 12. Graham Clark – SR 15. Tom Hancock – SR 13. Patrick Mago* – LK
Interchange: 14. Connor Jones, 16. Troy Kapea, 17. Jack Brock, 20. Colin Wilkie.
* = Cowboys allocation (4 players allocated for this match).
Pride Out: Kienan Grogan-Hayes (fullback), Javid Bowen* (centre), Nathan Wales (second row), Keelan White (bench).
Pride In: Matthew Musumeci (fullback), Bradley Stephen (centre), Patrick Mago* (lock), Connor Jones (bench).
Changes: Colin Wilkie (hooker to bench), Graham Clark (lock to second row), Ryan Ghietti (c) (bench to hooker).
Wynnum-Manly Seagulls: 1. Daniel Ogden, 2. Peter Gubb, 3. Jeriah Goodrich, 4. Alex Barr, 5. Jack Goodsell, 6. Paora Kemp, 19. Shaun Nona, 8. Aaron Rockley, 9. John Te Reo, 10. Ngarima Pita, 11. Salesi Funaki, 12. Max Elliott, 13. Mitchell Frei (c).
Interchange: 14. Jayden Berrell, 15. Stedman Lefau, 16. Billy Solah, 17. Adam Tuimavave-Gerrard.
* = Brisbane Broncos allocation (? players allocated for this match).
Coach: Adam Brideson.

Position	Round 20 - 2017	P	W	D	L	B	For	Against	Diff	Pts
12	Northern Pride	19	5	0	14	1	320	439	-119	12

ROUND 21: Intrust Super Cup 2017

Saturday
29 July 2017
15:00 AEST (UTC+10)

Ipswich Jets	32 – 22	Northern Pride
Tries: Richard Pandia; Jayden Connors 2 Michael Purcell 2 Nemani Valekapa; Goals: Luke Capewell (3 from 5) 3 Jayden Connors (1 from 1) 1	Half-time: 22 – 6 Penalties: 8 – 8 QRL Report	Tries: 1 Marcus Jensen*; 1 Javid Bowen*; 1 Shawn Bowen; 1 Bradley Stephen; Goals: 3 Jordan Biondi-Odo (3 from 4)

North Ipswich Reserve
(Ipswich, QLD)
Referee: Tim Rutherford

Sea Swift Northern Pride: 3. Gideon Gela-Mosby* – FB 2. Shawn Bowen – WG 4. Bradley Stephen – CE 19. Javid Bowen* – CE 5. Marcus Jensen* – WG 6. Jordan Biondi-Odo – FE 7. Ryan Ghietti (c) – HB 10. Darryn Schonig – PR 9. Connor Jones – HK 15. Sheldon Powe-Hobbs – PR 11. Nathan Wales – SR 12. Tom Hancock – SR 13. Graham Clark – LK
Interchange: 14. Colin Wilkie, 15. Aidan Day, 17. Jack Brock, 20. Keelan White.
* = Cowboys allocation (3 players allocated for this match).
Pride Out: Matthew Musumeci (fullback), Jared Allen (halfback), Patrick Mago* (lock), Troy Kapea (bench).
Pride In: Javid Bowen* (centre), Nathan Wales (second row), Aidan Day (bench), Keelan White (bench).
Changes: Gideon Gela-Mosby* (wing to fullback), Shawn Bowen (centre to wing), Ryan Ghietti (c) (hooker to halfback), Graham Clark (second row to lock), Connor Jones (bench to hooker).
Ipswich Jets: 18. Jayden Connors, 2. Michael Purcell, 3. Marion Seve, 4. Nemani Valekapa, 5. Richard Pandia, 6 Luke Capewell, 7. Dane Phillips (c), 16. Fakahoko Teutau, 13. Ben White, 10. Nathaniel Neale, 11. Josh Seage, 12. Sebastian Pandia, 22. Tyson Lofipo
Interchange: 9. Denzel King, 14. Hugh Sedger, 15. Lachlan Roe, 21. Jesse Roberts.
* = Brisbane Broncos allocation (? players allocated for this match)
Coaches: Ben Walker and Shane Walker.

Position	Round 21 - 2017	P	W	D	L	B	For	Against	Diff	Pts
12	Northern Pride	20	5	0	15	1	342	471	-129	12

ROUND 22: Intrust Super Cup 2017

Saturday
5 August 2017
17:30 AEST (UTC+10)

Northern Pride	24 – 28	Souths Logan Magpies
Tries: Javid Bowen* 2 Gideon Gela-Mosby* 1 Ben Hampton* 1 Goals: Jordan Biondi-Odo (4 from 4) 4 Penalty Goals: 0	Half-time: 6 – 14; Penalties: 5 – 8 QRL Report	Tries: 2 Sam Scarlett; 1 Simi Fatafehi; 1 Cameron Booth; Goals: 3 Jamayne Isaako (3 from 4); Penalty Goals: 3 Jamayne Isaako (3 from 3)

Barlow Park
(Severin Street, Parramatta Park, QLD)
Referee: Tim Rutherford

Sea Swift Northern Pride: 1. Gideon Gela-Mosby* – FB 2. Matthew Musumeci – WG 3. Javid Bowen* – CE 4. Bradley Stephen – CE 5. Kienan Grogan-Hayes – WG 6. Jordan Biondi-Odo – FE 7. Jack Campagnolo – HB 8. Jack Brock – PR 9. Colin Wilkie – HK 10. Darryn Schonig – PR 11. Nathan Wales – SR 12. Graham Clark – SR 13. Patrick Mago* – LK
Interchange: 14. Ben Hampton*, 15. Tom Hancock, 16. Aiden Day, 17. Troy Kapea.
* = Cowboys allocation (4 players allocated for this match).
Unavailable: Patrick Mago* selected to play his first game for the North Queensland Cowboys.
Pride Out: Shawn Bowen (wing), Marcus Jensen* (wing), Ryan Ghietti (halfback), Sheldon Powe-Hobbs (front row), Connor Jones (hooker), Keelan White (bench).
Pride In: Matthew Musumeci (wing), Kienan Grogan-Hayes (wing), Jack Campagnolo (halfback), Patrick Mago* (lock), Ben Hampton* (bench), Troy Kapea (bench).
Changes: Tom Hancock (second row to bench), Graham Clark (lock to second row), Colin Wilkie (bench to hooker), Jack Brock (bench to front row).
Souths Logan Magpies: 1. Jamayne Isaako, 2. Cameron Booth, 3. Lenny Magey, 4. Scott Doyle, 5 Luke Archer, 6. Matt Minto, 7. Sam Scarlett, 8. George Fai, 9. Travis Waddell, 10. Sam Lavea, 11. Simi Fatafehi, 12. Brendon Gibb, 19. Jaydn Su'a.
* = Brisbane Broncos allocation (? players allocated for this match).
Coach: Jon Buchanan.
- Note: This was the Pride debut for Jack Campagnolo (Pride Player 142).

Position	Round 22 - 2017	P	W	D	L	B	For	Against	Diff	Pts
12	Northern Pride	21	5	0	16	1	366	499	-133	10

ROUND 23: Intrust Super Cup 2017

12–13 August 2017.

Northern Pride	BYE

Position	Round 23 - 2017	P	W	D	L	B	For	Against	Diff	Pts
12	Northern Pride	21	5	0	16	2	366	499	-133	14

ROUND 24: Intrust Super Cup 2017

Sunday
20 August 2017
13:40 AEST (UTC+10)

Tweed Heads Seagulls	16 – 18	Northern Pride
Tries: Brayden McGrady 2 Jayden Corrigan 1 Goals: Lindon McGrady (2 from 3) 2	Half-time: 4 – 6 Penalties: 5 – 4 QRL Report	Tries: 1 Bradley Stephen; 1 Shawn Bowen; 1 Colin Wilkie; Goals: 3 Jordan Biondi-Odo (3 from 3)

Piggabeen Sports Complex
(Caramar Drive, Tweed Heads West, NSW)
Referee: Jarrod Cole, Ben Watts

Sea Swift Northern Pride: 1. Matthew Musumeci – FB 2. Marcus Jensen* – WG 3. Gideon Gela-Mosby* – CE 4. Bradley Stephen – CE 5. Shawn Bowen – WG 6. Jordan Biondi-Odo – FE 7. Jack Campagnolo – HB 10. Sheldon Powe-Hobbs – PR 9. Ryan Ghietti (c) – HK 16. Aidan Day – PR 19. Colin Wilkie – SR 12. Tom Hancock – SR 13. Graham Clark – LK
Interchange: 8. Jack Brock, 14. Connor Jones, 17. Brad Lupi, 20. Keelan White.
* = Cowboys allocation (2 players allocated for this match).
Pride Out: Javid Bowen* (centre), Kienan Grogan-Hayes (wing), Darryn Schonig (front row), Nathan Wales (second row), Patrick Mago* (lock), Ben Hampton* (bench), Troy Kapea (bench).
Pride In: Marcus Jensen* (wing), Shawn Bowen (wing), Ryan Ghietti (c) (hooker), Sheldon Powe-Hobbs (front row), Connor Jones (bench), Brad Lupi (bench), Keelan White (bench).
Changes: Gideon Gela-Mosby* (fullback to centre), Matthew Musumeci (wing to fullback), Jack Brock (front row to bench), Colin Wilkie (hooker to second row), Graham Clark (second row to lock), Tom Hancock (bench to second row), Aidan Day (bench to front row).
Tweed Seagulls: 1. Jayden Corrigan, 2. Brayden Mcgrady, 3. James Wood, 4. Regan Muir, 5. Peter Lee, 6. Lindon Mcgrady, 22. Phoenix Hunapo, 8. Jarrod Morfett, 9. Sam Meskell (c), 13. Shem Vaoa, 11. Lamar Liolevave, 12. Tristan Lumley, 14. Nick Harrold
Interchange: 10. Jordan Aiono, 15. Sione Alofi, 16. Sam Carson, 17. Will Johnstone.
* = Gold Coast Titans allocation (? players allocated for this match).
Coach: Aaron Zimmerle.
- Note: This was the Pride debut for Brad Lupi (Pride Player 143).

Position	Round 24 - 2018	P	W	D	L	B	For	Against	Diff	Pts
12	Northern Pride	22	6	0	16	2	384	515	-131	16

ROUND 25: Intrust Super Cup 2017

Saturday
26 August 2017
17:30 AEST (UTC+10)

Northern Pride	16 – 40	Redcliffe Dolphins
Tries: Jack Campagnolo 1 Gideon Gela-Mosby* 1 Marcus Jensen* 1 Goals: Jordan Biondi-Odo (2 from 3) 2	Half-time: 16 – 12; Penalties: 6 – 8 QRL Report	Tries:'; 1 Matthew Lodge; 3 Jonus Pearson; 1 Christian Hazard; 2 Myles Taueli; Goals: 6 Tyson Gamble (5 from 6); 1 Sam Anderson (1 from 1)

Barlow Park
(Severin Street, Parramatta Park, QLD)
Referee: Tim Rutherford.
Player of the Match: Ryan Ghietti

Sea Swift Northern Pride: 1. Matthew Musumeci – FB 2. Marcus Jensen* – WG 3. Gideon Gela-Mosby* – CE 4. Bradley Stephen – CE 5. Shawn Bowen – WG 6. Jordan Biondi-Odo – FE 7. Jack Campagnolo – HB 8. Sheldon Powe-Hobbs – PR 9. Ryan Ghietti (c) – HK 10. Darryn Schonig – PR 11. Graham Clark – SR 12. Tom Hancock – SR 13. Patrick Mago* – LK
Interchange: 14. Colin Wilkie, 15. Troy Kapea, 17. Aiden Day, 17. Jack Brock.	* = Cowboys allocation (3 players allocated for this match).
Pride Out: Connor Jones (bench), Brad Lupi (bench), Keelan White (bench).
Pride In: Darryn Schonig (front row), Patrick Mago* (lock), Troy Kapea (bench).
Changes: Aidan Day (front row to bench), Colin Wilkie (second row to bench), Graham Clark (lock to second row).
Redcliffe Dolphins: 1. Zach Strasser, 2. Jonus Pearson, 3. Thompson Teteh, 4. Mosese Pangai, 5. Tom Opacic, 6. Tyson Gamble, 7. Jack Ahearn, 8. Nathan Watts, 9. Shane Pumipi, 10. Matt Lodge, 11. Daniel Bridge, 12. Troy Giess, 13. Sam Anderson (c).
Interchange: 14. Christian Hazard, 16. Myles Lee-Taueli, 17. Aaron Whitchurch, 20. Taylor Brown.
* = Brisbane Broncos allocation (? players allocated for this match).
Coach: Adam Mogg.

Position	Round 25 - 2017	P	W	D	L	B	For	Against	Diff	Pts
12	Northern Pride	23	6	0	17	2	400	555	-155	16

=== 2017 Ladder ===
2017 Queensland Cup
Pos	Team	Pld	W	D	L	B	PF	PA	PD	Pts
1	Papua New Guinea Hunters (P)	23	17	1	5	2	550	378	+172	39
2	Redcliffe Dolphins	23	17	0	6	2	604	332	+272	38
3	Easts Tigers	23	16	1	6	2	596	422	+174	37
4	Sunshine Coast Falcons	23	15	1	7	2	645	418	+227	35
5	Souths Logan Magpies	23	15	0	8	2	580	484	+96	34
6	Townsville Blackhawks	23	12	2	9	2	575	473	+102	30
7	Ipswich Jets	23	12	0	11	2	536	539	-3	28
8	Mackay Cutters	23	10	2	11	2	531	566	-35	26
9	Burleigh Bears	23	10	0	13	2	466	510	-64	24
10	Wynnum Manly Seagulls	23	9	0	14	2	433	465	-32	22
11	Norths Devils	23	9	0	14	2	502	570	-68	22
12	Northern Pride	23	6	0	17	2	400	555	-155	16
13	Tweed Heads Seagulls	23	5	0	18	2	337	710	-373	14
14	Central Queensland Capras	23	4	1	18	2	416	729	-313	13

==== Northern Pride (regular season 2017) ====
- Win = 6 (2 of 11 home games, 4 of 12 away games)
- Loss = 17 (9 of 11 home games, 8 of 12 away games)

Round	1	2	3	4	5	6	7	8	9	10	11	12	13	14	15	16	17	18	19	20	21	22	23	24	25
Result	W	L	L	L	W	L	L	W	L	W	L	L	L	L	B	L	L	L	L	W	L	L	B	W	L
Ground	A	A	H	A	H	H	H	A	A	H	A	A	H	A	B	H	H	H	A	A	A	H	B	A	H

Source: https://web.archive.org/web/20120916041305/http://www.qrl.com.au/
A = Away; H = Home; B = Bye; W = Win; D = Draw; L = Loss; P = Postpone

== 2017 Northern Pride players ==
Pride player	Appearances	Tries	Goals	Field goals	Pts
Aidan Day	8	0	0	0	0
Brad Lupi	1	0	0	0	0
Bradley Stephen	16	6	2	0	28
Colin Wilkie	21	3	0	0	12
Connor Jones	16	2	0	0	8
Darryn Schonig	22	3	0	0	12
Graham Clark	23	3	0	0	12
Jack Brock	7	0	0	0	0
Jack Campagnolo	3	1	0	0	4
Jared Allen	15	3	0	0	12
Joel Riethmuller	7	1	0	0	4
Jordan Biondi-Odo	23	3	26	0	64
Justin Castellaro	11	2	0	0	8
Keelan White	6	1	0	0	4
Khan Ahwang	12	6	26	0	76
Kienan Grogan-Hayes	5	2	0	0	8
Luke George	8	0	0	0	0
Matthew Musumeci	7	1	0	0	4
Nathan Wales	9	1	0	0	4
Ryan Ghietti	22	0	0	0	0
Shaun Bowen	7	5	0	0	20
Sheldon Powe-Hobbs	19	2	0	0	8
Tom Hancock	16	0	0	0	0
Troy Kapea	20	2	0	0	8
Will Bugden	16	1	0	0	4

=== North Queensland Cowboys who played for the Pride in 2017 ===
Cowboys player	Appearances	Tries	Goals	Field goals	Pts
Ben Hampton*	3	1	0	0	4
Ben Spina*	4	1	0	0	4
Gideon Gela-Mosby*	16	8	0	0	32
Javid Bowen*	8	4	0	0	16
Marcus Jensen*	20	8	0	0	32
Patrick Mago*	20	2	0	0	8

== Team of the Decade, 2008–2017 ==
In 2017, to mark the ten-year anniversary of the Northern Pride, a 'Team of the Decade' was selected. Eligible players had to have played 30 matches for the Pride. The selection panel was Brett Allen, Rhys O'Neill, Pat Bailey, Greg Dowling, Rob White and Bob Fowler. The Team was announced at a Gala Anniversary Dinner on 30 June 2017.
