= Joel Riethmuller =

Italy international rugby league footballer

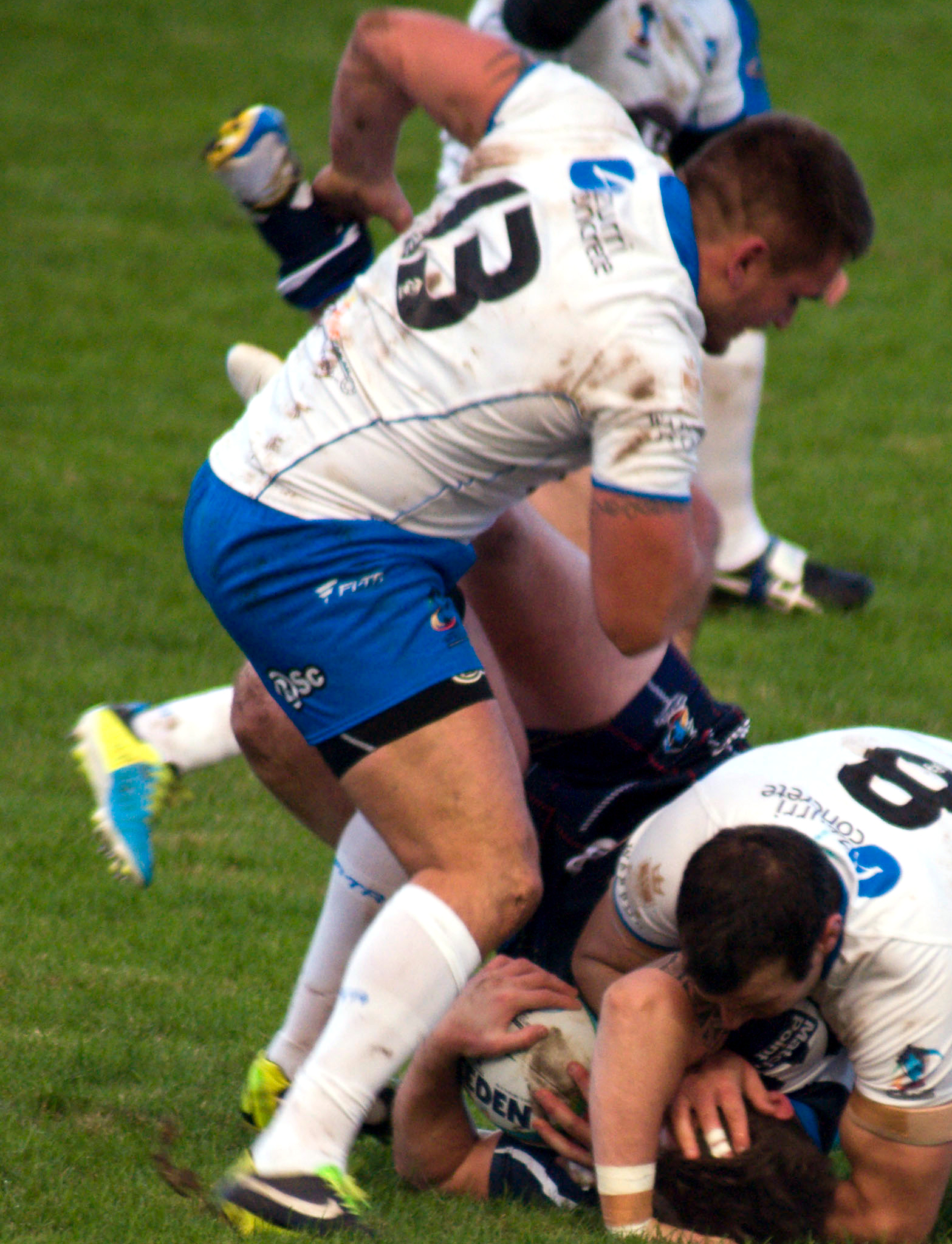

Personal information
- Born: 9 May 1985 (age 39); Tully, Queensland, Australia
- Height: 180 cm (5 ft 11 in)
- Weight: 96 kg (15 st 2 lb)

Playing information
- Position: Lock, Second-row
Club
Years	Team	Pld	T	G	FG	P
2011–14	North Qld Cowboys	31	1	0	0	4
Representative
Years	Team	Pld	T	G	FG	P
2011–17	Italy	12	2	0	0	8
2011	Queensland Residents	1	1	0	0	4
- Source: As of 5 January 2024

Joel Riethmuller (born 9 May 1985) is an Italy international rugby league footballer who previously played professionally for the North Queensland Cowboys in the National Rugby League.

== Background ==
Riethmuller was born in Tully, Queensland, Australia.

== Playing career ==
Riethmuller played his junior football for the Tully Tigers. Before playing for the North Queensland side, he played for the Ipswich Jets and the Northern Pride in the Queensland Cup; winning a premiership with the Pride in 2010.

He made his NRL debut against the Manly-Warringah Sea Eagles in round 14 of the 2011 season, at the age of 26, having broken into the Cowboys' first-grade squad after performing well in the Queensland Cup. He signed a new two-year contract with the Townsville based outfit shortly after his debut. At the end of the 2011 season he made his international debut for Italy in a 96–8 win over Russia in Padova. He qualified for the Italian team by virtue of having an Italian grandfather.

Riethmuller made 21 tackles in just 19 minutes on the field in his debut game. Riethmuller represented the Queensland Residents on three occasions, scoring two tries. Riethmuller scored his first NRL try in his fourth NRL Game against Newcastle in their round 18 win over them at McDonald Jones Stadium. In 2012 he was named in the Queensland Residents side.

Riethmuller won his second Queensland Cup in 2014 playing for the Pride. In 2015, Riethmuller was playing for Cairns Brothers in the Cairns District Rugby League Competition. He is an Australian Apprenticeships Ambassador for the Australian Government and an Apprentice Mentor in the NRL's Trade UP with the NRL Program.
