= Colin Wilkie =

Italy international rugby league footballer

Personal information
- Born: 13 September 1986 (age 40) Innisfail, Queensland, Australia
- Height: 182 cm (6 ft 0 in)
- Weight: 96 kg (15 st 2 lb)

Playing information
- Position: Centre, Halfback, Hooker, Lock
Representative
Years	Team	Pld	T	G	FG	P
2016–17	Italy	4	3	0	0	12
- Source: As of 29 October 2017

Colin Wilkie (born 13 September 1986) is former Italy international rugby league footballer who played as a utility for the Northern Pride in the Intrust Super Cup.

== Background ==
Wilkie was born in Innisfail, Queensland, Australia and is of Italian descent.

He played his junior rugby league for the Tully Tigers. He attended Tully State High School and Kirwan State High School before being signed by the Melbourne Storm when he was just 15-years-old.

Wilkie has transitioned from player to coach and is currently an assistant coach at Wynnum Manly Seagulls in the Brisbane A-Grade Rugby League (BRL) under the Queensland Rugby League (QRL).

== Playing career ==
Wilkie was contracted to the Storm from 2002 to 2006, primarily playing for their Queensland Cup feeder club, the Norths Devils. In 2002 and 2003, he represented the Queensland under-17 side. In 2005, he was selected to play for the Queensland under-19 and Junior Kangaroos sides. In 2007, he joined the North Queensland Cowboys, spending the season playing for their Queensland Cup feeder club, the North Queensland Young Guns.

In 2015, after stints in the local Townsville and Newcastle competitions, Wilkie signed with the newly formed Queensland Cup side, the Townsville Blackhawks. He left without playing a game for the club, moving to the Northern Pride in 2016, where he played his first Queensland Cup game since 2007.

In 2016, he represented Italy in the 2017 Rugby League World Cup qualifiers, playing three games and scoring three tries. In 2017, he was named in Italy's 2017 Rugby League World Cup squad.
