= Ben Hampton =

Australian rugby league footballer

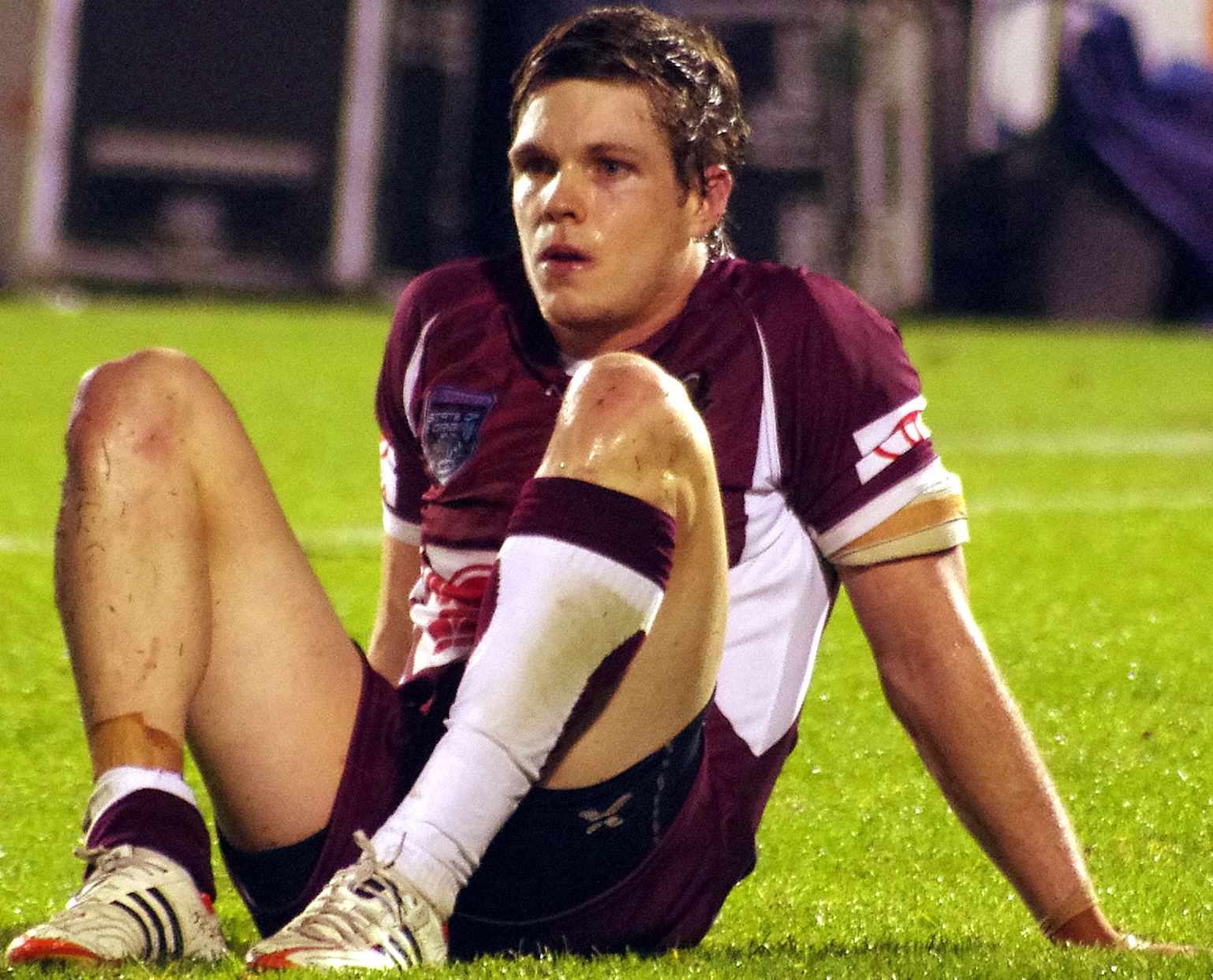

Personal information
- Full name: Benjamin Hampton
- Born: 29 February 1992 (age 34) Wagga Wagga, New South Wales, Australia
- Height: 179 cm (5 ft 10 in)
- Weight: 89 kg (14 st 0 lb)

Playing information
- Position: Five-eighth, Centre, Wing, Halfback, Fullback
Club
Years	Team	Pld	T	G	FG	P
2013–16	Melbourne Storm	35	6	0	0	24
2017–23	North Qld Cowboys	82	17	0	0	68
	Total	117	23	0	0	92
Representative
Years	Team	Pld	T	G	FG	P
2015	Queensland Residents	1	0	0	0	0
- Source: As of 6 January 2024

Ben Hampton (born 29 February 1992) is an Australian former professional rugby league footballer who last played as a utility for the North Queensland Cowboys in the National Rugby League (NRL).

Hampton previously played for the Melbourne Storm and has played in a number of positions throughout his career.

== Early life ==
Hampton was born in Wagga Wagga, New South Wales, Australia and grew up in Temora, New South Wales, attending Temora West Public School until year 6.

He played junior rugby league for the Temora Dragons. When his family moved to Mareeba in North Queensland, he attended Mareeba State High School and played his junior football for the Mareeba Gladiators before being signed to a Melbourne Storm scholarship.

== Playing career ==
=== Early career ===
In 2008, while playing for the Northern Marlins representative side, Hampton represented the Queensland under-16 rugby league team. In 2010, Hampton joined the Storm's SG Ball Cup side. Later that year he made his debut for their NYC side and was chosen for the Queensland under-18 rugby league team. In 2012, Hampton was promoted to Melbourne's full-time squad and selected to captain the Queensland under-20 rugby league team in the inaugural U20 State of Origin match. In October 2012, Hampton played fullback for the Junior Kangaroos in their 48–16 win over the Junior Kiwis.

=== 2013 ===
Hampton made his NRL debut for the Melbourne Storm in round 15 against the Gold Coast, where he scored Melbourne's two tries, made an impressive try saving tackle on Ashley Harrison and took on the kicking duties after senior playmaker Gareth Widdop was stretchered from the field. He played only one further first-grade match in 2013, mostly playing for Melbourne's feeder teams in the NSW and QLD Cups, the Cronulla-Sutherland Sharks and Easts Tigers.

=== 2014 ===
Due to the departures of Widdop and Brett Finch, Hampton started the season as Melbourne's starting five-eighth, until Round 16 when he was dropped for Ben Roberts. He didn't play in first grade for the rest of the year. On 30 July, Hampton re-signed with the Melbourne Storm keeping him with the club to the end of the 2016 NRL season. Hampton finished the year with 11 matches and 2 tries.

=== 2015 ===
Hampton played for the Melbourne club in the 2015 NRL Auckland Nines. He finished off the season with three matches and 1 try for the Melbourne Storm, playing most of the year for the Sunshine Coast Falcons in the Queensland Cup.

=== 2016 ===
Hampton was again named in the Storm's Nines squad. On 2 October, in the 2016 NRL Grand Final against the Cronulla-Sutherland Sharks, Hampton played off the interchange bench in the Storm's 14–12 loss. Hampton finished the 2016 NRL season with one try from 20 matches. On 27 October, the North Queensland Cowboys signed Hampton to a three-year deal, starting in 2017.

=== 2017 ===
In February, Hampton was named in the North Queensland Cowboys Nines squad. In Round 1, Hampton made his club debut for the North Queensland club against the Canberra Raiders, where he came off the interchange bench in the 20-16 Golden point extra time win at 1300SMILES Stadium. He scored his first try for the club in North Queensland's Round 11 loss to the Cronulla-Sutherland Sharks. On 1 October, Hampton started on the interchange in the Cowboys' 2017 NRL Grand Final loss to his former club, the Melbourne Storm. He played 26 games in 2017, the most in his career to date.

This season Hampton played three games for the Cowboys' Cairns based feeder club, the Northern Pride, scoring one try.

=== 2018 ===
Hampton played 22 games for the North Queensland club in 2018, starting in all but eight games. Due to an injury to Lachlan Coote, he began the season as the club's starting fullback, playing the first five games of the year in the position. He moved to centre in Round 6 following Coote's return, playing seven games there before returning to the bench in Round 15. He ended the year as the Cowboys' starting fullback, playing the last two games in the position, scoring four tries.

=== 2019 ===
After starting the season with the Northern Pride, Hampton made his season debut in North Queensland's Round 3 loss to the Cronulla-Sutherland Sharks. In Round 5, Hampton played on the wing for the first time in his NRL career in North Queensland's loss to the Melbourne Storm. In Round 10, he ruptured his bicep in the Cowboys' win over the Parramatta Eels, ruling him out for the rest of the season. On 17 September, Hampton signed a 2-year contract extension which would take him to the end of 2021. On 18 September, he was named the Cowboys' 2019 Club Person of the Year at the club's presentation night.

=== 2020 ===
After an injury interrupted 2019, Hampton returned to the North Queensland Cowboys starting line-up in 2020, starting their first four games on the wing, scoring four tries. Hampton was moved back to the bench in Round 6 and played five games in the utility role. In Round 11, he played his 100th NRL game. In Round 12, Hampton started at five-eighth for the first time since 2017, playing three more games in the halves.

== Post playing ==
After retiring from the NRL, Hampton became a firefighter.

== Achievements and accolades ==
=== Individual ===
- North Queensland Cowboys Club Person of the Year: 2019

== Statistics ==
=== NRL ===
Statistics are correct to the end of the 2020 season

Season	Team	Matches	T	G	GK %	F/G	Pts
2013	Melbourne	2	2	0	–	0	8
2014	Melbourne	11	2	0	–	0	8
2015	Melbourne	3	1	0	–	0	4
2016	Melbourne	19	1	0	–	0	4
2017	North Queensland	26	1	0	–	0	4
2018	North Queensland	22	8	0	–	0	32
2019	North Queensland	8	2	0	—	0	8
2020	North Queensland	13	4	0	—	0	16
2021	North Queensland	10	2				8
2022	North Queensland	2					
2023	North Queensland	1					
Career totals		117	23	0	—	0	92
