= Connor Watson =

Australian rugby league footballer (born 1996)

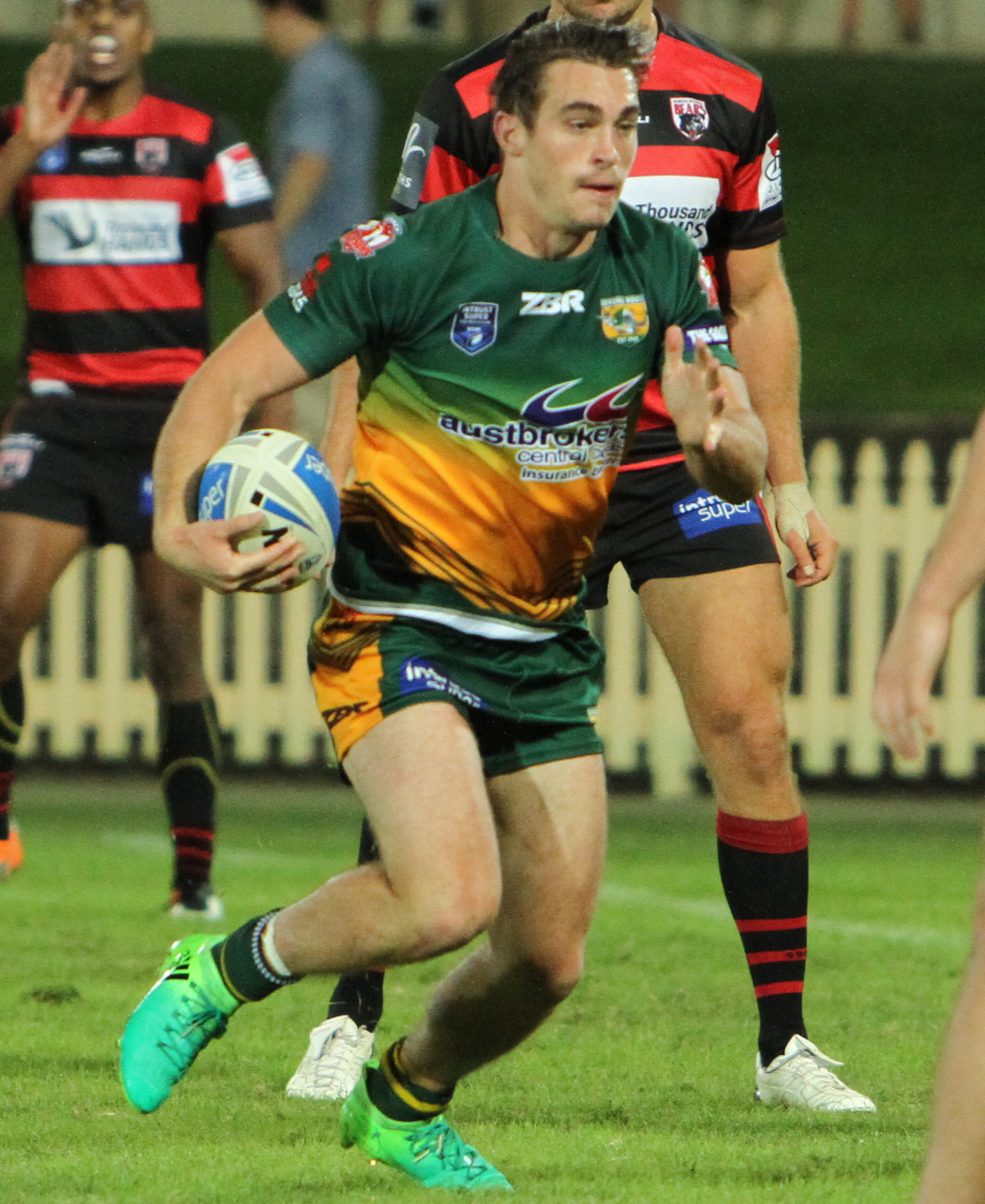

Personal information
- Born: 31 May 1996 (age 30) Dubbo, New South Wales, Australia
- Height: 177 cm (5 ft 10 in)
- Weight: 89 kg (14 st 0 lb)

Playing information
- Position: Hooker, Lock, Five-eighth
Club
Years	Team	Pld	T	G	FG	P
2016–17	Sydney Roosters	38	9	0	0	36
2018–21	Newcastle Knights	66	14	0	0	56
2022–26	Sydney Roosters	89	12	0	0	48
2027–	St George Illawarra Dragons	0	0	0	0	0
	Total	193	35	0	0	140
Representative
Years	Team	Pld	T	G	FG	P
2017	Country NSW	1	0	0	0	0
2020–25	Indigenous All Stars	2	0	0	0	0
2024–25	New South Wales	5	0	0	0	0
- Source: As of 16 November 2026

Connor Watson (born 31 May 1996) is an Australian professional rugby league footballer who plays as a hooker for the St George Illawarra Dragons in the National Rugby League (NRL), the Indigenous All Stars in the All Stars and as a utility for New South Wales in the State of Origin series.

He previously played for the Sydney Roosters and the Newcastle Knights in the NRL. He represented NSW Country Origin in 2017. A utility player, Watson began his NRL career off the bench before starting at five-eighth, fullback then as a hooker and then as a lock in 2021.

== Early life ==
Watson was born in Dubbo, New South Wales, Australia and is of Indigenous Australian descent. At the age of five, he moved to Avoca Beach.

He played his junior rugby league for the Terrigal Sharks and Kincumber Colts, before gaining an Australian Indigenous Education Foundation (AIEF) scholarship at Knox Grammar School and playing rugby union. In an interview on the Marlee & Me podcast, Connor described being an AIEF Scholarship Student as "so good...[AIEF] do such a terrific job". While playing rugby union, he spent part of his time playing rugby league with the South Eastern Seagulls. He was then signed by the Sydney Roosters.

== Playing career ==
=== Early career ===
In 2015 and 2016, Watson played for the Sydney Roosters' NYC team. In July 2015, he re-signed with the Sydney Roosters on a two-year contract.

=== 2016 ===
In round 7 of the 2016 NRL season, Watson made his NRL debut for the Sydney Roosters against the Penrith Panthers. In round 13 against the Wests Tigers, he scored his first NRL try. In December, he extended his Roosters contract from the end of 2017 until the end of 2018.

=== 2017 ===
At the 2017 NRL Auckland Nines in February, Watson was named player of the tournament after the Roosters won the final. On 7 May, Watson played for Country Origin against City Origin off the interchange bench in the 20–10 loss in Mudgee. On 24 July, he signed a 3-year contract with the Newcastle Knights starting in 2018, after seeking a release from the final year of his Sydney Roosters contract.

=== 2018 ===
In round 1 of the 2018 season, Watson made his debut for Newcastle in their 19-18 golden point extra-time win over the Manly Warringah Sea Eagles. In round 2 against the Canberra Raiders, Watson scored his first try for the Newcastle club in their 30–28 win at Canberra Stadium.

=== 2020 ===
After suffering a number of ankle problems during Newcastle's 2020 NRL season, Watson suffered a ruptured achilles playing against the Canterbury-Bankstown Bulldogs in the Round 11, 18–12 loss, ending his season.

=== 2021 ===
After playing over 60 games for the Newcastle club, Watson chose to knock back a contract extension and instead signed a two-year contract to return to the Sydney Roosters in 2022.

=== 2022 ===
Watson played a total of 21 games for the Sydney Roosters in the 2022 NRL season including the club’s elimination final loss to South Sydney.

=== 2023 ===
Watson was ruled out for the 2023 NRL season due to suffering a patella tendon injury during Roosters training.

=== 2024 ===
On 16 June, Watson was selected by New South Wales for game two of the 2024 State of Origin series. Watson played in both games two and three of the series as New South Wales won the shield 2-1. Watson played 21 matches for the Sydney Roosters in the 2024 NRL season as they finished third on the table. Watson played in all three finals matches for the club including their preliminary final loss against Melbourne.

=== 2025 ===
In round 2 of the 2025 NRL season, Watson scored two tries for the Sydney Roosters in their upset 38-32 victory over Penrith. In May, Watson was selected by New South Wales ahead of the 2025 State of Origin series. He played in all three games as New South Wales lost the series 2-1. Watson played 21 games for the Sydney Roosters in the 2025 NRL season as the club finished 8th on the table and qualified for the finals. Watson played in the clubs elimination final loss against Cronulla.

=== 2026 ===
On 29 May 2026, it was reported that Watson would join the PNG Chiefs in 2028. On 2 June, St. George Illawarra announced that Watson would join the club for the 2027 season. The PNG Chiefs also officially confirmed the signing of Watson from 2028 until 2029 as the team's third signing. In the preliminary final against the Dolphins, Watson failed a Category 1 HIA, after suffering a head knock. Watson subsequently missed the 2026 NRL Grand Final, which saw the Sydney Roosters triumph 19-18 against the Newcastle Knights. After the trophy presentation, coach Trent Robinson gave Watson his premiership ring.

== Statistics ==
Year	Team	Games	Tries	Pts
2016	Sydney Roosters	16	5	20
2017	Sydney Roosters	22	4	16
2018	Newcastle Knights	15	7	28
2019	Newcastle Knights	21	4	16
2020	Newcastle Knights	5	1	4
2021	Newcastle Knights	25	2	8
2022	Sydney Roosters	21	3	12
2024	Sydney Roosters	21	2	8
2025	Sydney Roosters	21	5	20
2026	Sydney Roosters	26	2	8
2027	St George Illawarra Dragons			
	Totals	193	35	140
