= Brent Webb =

New Zealand international rugby league footballer (born 1980)

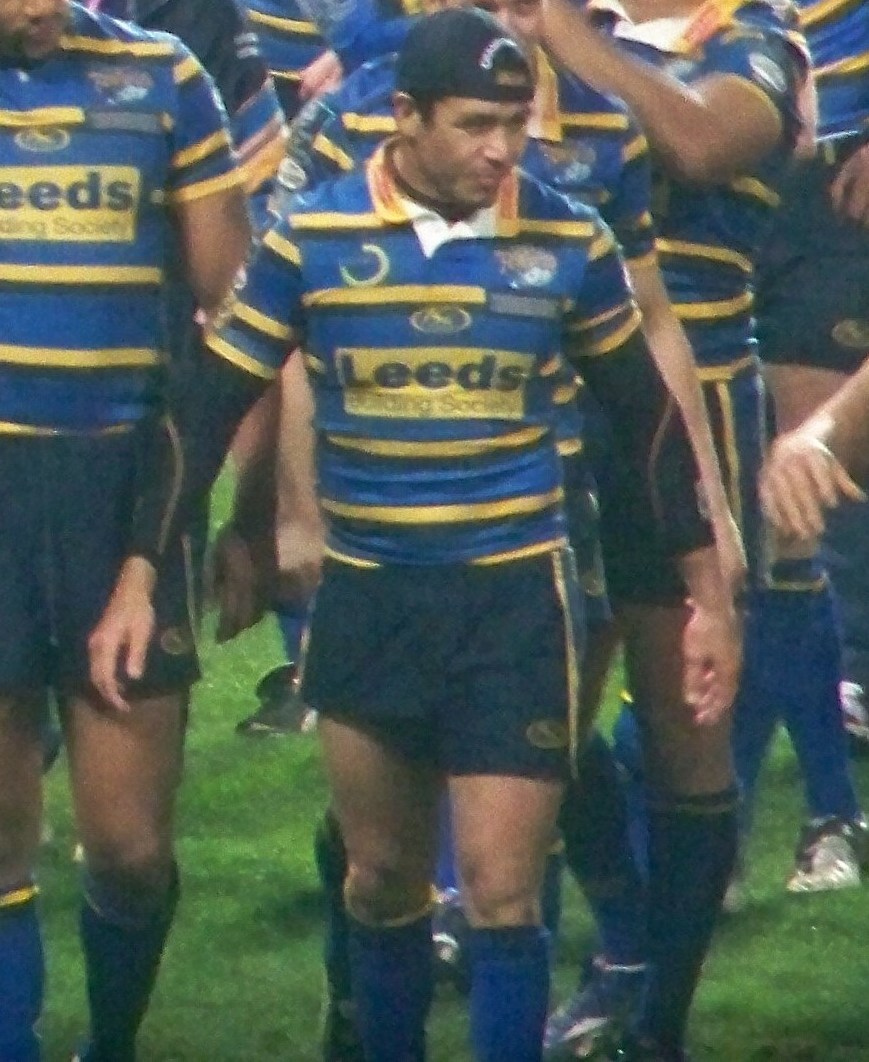

Personal information
- Full name: Brent Douglas Webb
- Born: 8 November 1980 (age 46) Cairns, Queensland, Australia

Playing information
- Height: 175 cm (5 ft 9 in)
- Weight: 82 kg (12 st 13 lb)
- Position: Fullback
Club
Years	Team	Pld	T	G	FG	P
2002–06	New Zealand Warriors	103	39	27	0	210
2007–12	Leeds Rhinos	155	88	0	0	352
2013–14	Catalans Dragons	10	2	0	0	8
	Total	268	129	27	0	570
Representative
Years	Team	Pld	T	G	FG	P
2004–08	New Zealand	17	9	10	0	56

Brent Douglas Webb (born 8 November 1980) is a former New Zealand international rugby league footballer who played as a fullback. He previously played for the New Zealand Warriors in the NRL, before moving the Leeds Rhinos and the Catalans Dragons in the Super League.

== Background ==
Webb was born in Cairns, Queensland, Australia. He is of Torres Strait Islander descent.

He was educated at Townsville's Kirwan State High School. He played his junior rugby for the Cairns Kangaroos. He was the Queensland Cup leading try scorer in 2001 before being spotted by Daniel Anderson, and signed by the New Zealand Warriors.

== Professional playing career ==
=== New Zealand Warriors ===
Webb made his NRL début for the Warriors in front of a home crowd against the Newcastle Knights on 1 April 2002, aged 21. He was named the Supporters' Player of the Year in 2003 and 2004. Webb became eligible for national team selection after living in New Zealand for three years. He was part of the New Zealand squad that won the 2005 Rugby League Tri-Nations. 2006 was Webb's last year for the Warriors. Despite being the club's top try-scorer with a career best 11 tries, it was a frustrating season.

=== Leeds Rhinos ===
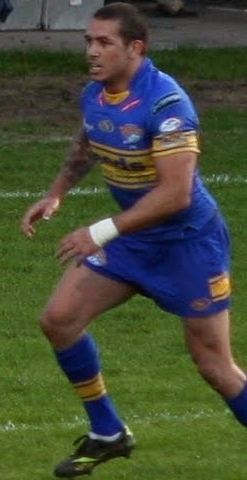
Webb playing for Leeds in 2010

In 2007 Webb joined Leeds Rhinos in the Super League on a two-year contract. He came to Leeds Rhinos fresh from being one of the players of the tournament in the Tri Nations. He became a favourite of the Leeds fans, and his attacking play earned him the chant from the South Stand spectators, 'Brent Webb is Superman!'.

Webb received a four match ban following two head high tackles in the Leeds Rhinos 2007 match against the Harlequins RL at the Twickenham Stoop. The Kiwi international had an eventful game, being placed on report twice and sin-binned, but then scoring two tries and having a hand in others.

Webb was forced to withdraw from the New Zealand squad for the 2008 Rugby League World Cup through injury.

He played in the 2009 Super League Grand Final victory over St. Helens at Old Trafford.

He played in the 2010 Challenge Cup Final defeat by the Warrington Wolves at Wembley Stadium.

On 29 June 2011 Brent signed a new 1-year deal with the Leeds Rhinos to keep him at the club until the end of 2012, despite reports linking him with a move to newly promoted Widnes Vikings.

Later that year he played at fullback in the 2011 Challenge Cup Final defeat by the Wigan Warriors at Wembley Stadium.

He played in the 2011 Super League Grand Final victory over St. Helens at Old Trafford.

=== Catalans Dragons ===
It was announced on 4 September 2012 that Webb had signed for the Catalans Dragons on a two-year deal. However, after a promising start, he suffered a recurrence of his back injury and subsequently lost his place in the team to Morgan Escare. After failing to recover, Webb was forced to retire from professional rugby league in 2014.

== Personal life ==
His partner Jenny gave birth to two sons. Their first son in April 2006 and named him Ruben Douglas Webb, after retired Kiwis' captain Ruben Wiki. Their second son was born on March, 22 2007 being Charlie Douglas Webb.
