= Enari Tuala =

Samoa international rugby league footballer

Personal information
- Born: 19 October 1998 (age 28) Cairns, Queensland, Australia
- Height: 188 cm (6 ft 2 in)
- Weight: 96 kg (15 st 2 lb)

Playing information
- Position: Centre, Wing
Club
Years	Team	Pld	T	G	FG	P
2017–19	North Qld Cowboys	18	2	0	0	8
2020–24	Newcastle Knights	87	40	0	0	160
2025–	Canterbury Bulldogs	28	10	0	0	40
	Total	133	52	0	0	208
Representative
Years	Team	Pld	T	G	FG	P
2018	Prime Minister's XIII	1	0	0	0	0
2026	Samoa	0	0	0	0	0
- Source: As of 16 November 2026

Enari Tuala (born 19 October 1998) is an Australian professional rugby league footballer who plays as a winger or centre for the Canterbury-Bankstown Bulldogs in the NRL and Samoa.

He previously played for the North Queensland Cowboys and Newcastle Knights in the National Rugby League, and has represented the Prime Minister's XIII.

== Background ==
Tuala was born in Cairns, Queensland, Australia, and is of Samoan descent.

He played his junior rugby league for the Edmonton Storm, before being signed by the North Queensland Cowboys.

== Playing career ==
=== Early career ===
After being signed by the North Queensland Cowboys, Tuala moved to Townsville, where he attended Kirwan State High School and played for the Townsville Stingers' Cyril Connell and Mal Meninga Cup sides. In 2014, Tuala represented the Queensland under-16 team. In 2015, Tuala scored a hat trick in the Stingers' Mal Meninga Cup Grand Final victory and was selected for the Queensland under-18 team. Later that year, he scored twice in Kirwan's ARL Schoolboy Cup final victory over Patrician Brothers' College, Blacktown. In 2016, Tuala played for North Queensland's NYC side, scoring 12 tries in 15 games. He was again selected for the Queensland under-18 side but was later ruled out through injury.

=== 2017 ===
In early 2017, Tuala trained during the pre-season with North Queensland's first grade squad. He played in their first NRL trial against the Sydney Roosters, scoring a try in the 11-10 win.

In May, Tuala played for the Junior Kangaroos against the Junior Kiwis, before re-signing with the North Queensland club on a two-year contract until the end of 2019. In round 24 of the 2017 NRL season, he made his NRL debut for the Cowboys against the Cronulla-Sutherland Sharks.

=== 2018 ===
In Round 13 of the 2018 NRL season against Manly Warringah Sea Eagles, Tuala scored his first NRL try in North Queensland's 26-12 win at Brookvale Oval.

On October 6, Tuala made his senior representative debut for the Prime Minister's XIII, coming off the bench and assisting a try in the side's 34–18 win over the PNG Prime Minister's XIII. A week later, on 13 October, he scored a double in the Junior Kangaroos 40–24 win over the Junior Kiwis.

=== 2019 ===
Tuala played just seven NRL games for North Queensland in 2019. He spent the majority of the season playing for the Northern Pride in the Queensland Cup.

On 13 September, it was announced that he would not be re-signed by the North Queensland club.

=== 2020 ===
Tuala joined the Newcastle Knights on a one-year contract ahead of the 2020 season.

Tuala played 20 games for Newcastle in the 2020 NRL season and scored 11 tries. He played in Newcastle's first finals game since 2013 which was a 46-20 loss against South Sydney in the elimination final.

=== 2021 ===
In round 20 of the 2021 NRL season, Tuala scored a hat-trick for Newcastle in a 34-24 victory over Canberra.

In round 22, he scored two tries for Newcastle in a 16-14 victory over Cronulla-Sutherland.

In week one of the 2021 Finals Series, Tuala scored a hat-trick for Newcastle in their 20-28 loss against Parramatta in the elimination final.

=== 2022 ===
In round 21 of the 2022 NRL season, Tuala scored two tries for Newcastle in a 14-10 victory over fellow cellar dwellers the Wests Tigers.

On 16 August, it was announced that Tuala had been stood down from the Newcastle club for not meeting team standards. Tuala had played in the club's loss against Brisbane in round 22 but failed to make the team bus which was heading to the airport the next morning.

=== 2023 ===
Tuala was limited to only six matches for Newcastle in the 2023 NRL season as the club finished 5th on the table.

=== 2024 ===
After playing in 87 matches for the Knights, Tuala parted ways with the club at the end of the season.

On November 4, Tuala signed a 2-year deal with the Canterbury Bulldogs.

=== 2026 ===
On 5 June, Canterbury announced that Tuala re-signed with the club for a further two years. Tuala played 19 matches for the club in the 2026 NRL season as they finished 12th on the table.

== Statistics ==
=== NRL ===
*denotes season still competing

Season	Team	Matches	T	G	GK %	F/G	Pts
2017	North Queensland	1	0	0	—	0	0
2018	North Queensland	10	2	0	—	0	8
2019	North Queensland	7	0	0	—	0	0
2020	Newcastle Knights	20	11				44
2021	Newcastle Knights	25	13				52
2022	Newcastle Knights	21	8				32
2023	Newcastle Knights	6	3				12
2024	Newcastle Knights	15	5				20
2025	Canterbury-Bankstown Bulldogs	9	5				20
2026	Canterbury-Bankstown Bulldogs	12	2				8
2027	Canterbury-Bankstown Bulldogs						
Career totals		126	49	0	—	0	196
