= Gideon Gela-Mosby =

Australian rugby league footballer

Personal information
- Born: 27 December 1996 (age 29) Cairns, Queensland, Australia
- Height: 180 cm (5 ft 11 in)
- Weight: 89 kg (14 st 0 lb)

Playing information
- Position: Wing
Club
Years	Team	Pld	T	G	FG	P
2017–19	North Qld Cowboys	11	6	0	0	24
- Source: As of 9 August 2019
- Education: Kirwan State High School
- Relatives: Hagiga Mosby (niece)

Gideon Gela-Mosby (born 27 December 1996) is an Australian professional rugby league footballer who last played for the North Queensland Cowboys in the NRL.

== Background ==
Born in Cairns and of Torres Strait Islander descent, Gela-Mosby grew up on the tiny Darnley Island in the Torres Strait. Gela-Mosby had never played rugby league until he moved back to Cairns to attend high school. While in Cairns he played his junior rugby league for the Cairns Kangaroos and Edmonton Storm. Gela-Mosby may be eligible for the Papua New Guinean national team through his parents' connection to Daru Island, a PNG-administered island of the Torres Strait.

== Playing career ==
=== Early career ===
In 2012, Gela-Mosby played for the Northern Pride's Cyril Connell Cup side, scoring 9 tries. In 2013, he moved up to the Pride's Mal Meninga Cup team. Gela-Mosby moved to Townsville in 2014, attending Kirwan State High School and playing for the Townsville Stingers Mal Meninga Cup side. He scored 7 tries in the side's premiership winning season and scored a try in the National Under-18 Championship final against the Sydney Roosters. That season he was selected for the Queensland under-18 and Australian Schoolboys sides. While attending Kirwan State High, Gela-Mosby won the Queensland Schoolboys 100 metre sprint title with a time of 10.95 seconds.

In 2015, Gela-Mosby joined the North Queensland Cowboys, playing for their NYC side. That season he broke the NYC record for most tries in a season, scoring 39 tries in 25 games. He was selected for the Queensland under-20 side, scoring a try, and was named in the NYC Team of the Year. In August 2015, he re-signed with the Cowboys on a 2-year contract until the end of 2017.

In 2016, Gela-Mosby was selected in the Cowboys' Auckland Nines squad, scoring 4 tries in the tournament. He spent the season playing for the Cowboys' NYC side, again being named in the NYC Team of the Year and representing the Queensland under-20 side. He finished his NYC career with 53 tries in 44 games.

=== 2017 ===
In 2017, Gela-Mosby joined the Cowboys' NRL squad and was a member of their Auckland Nines squad, where he scored 6 tries and was named in the Team of the Tournament. He started the season playing for the Cowboys' feeder club the Northern Pride in the Queensland Cup.

In Round 4 of the 2017 NRL season, Gela-Mosby made his NRL debut, scoring a try in the Cowboys win against the Gold Coast Titans. On 30 August, he re-signed with the Cowboys until the end of the 2019 season.

=== 2018 ===
Gela-Mosby started the season playing for the Northern Pride, although he missed the opening five rounds due to a shoulder charge suspension picked up at the end of the 2017 season. After scoring 10 tries in 11 games for the Pride, Gela-Mosby returned to the Cowboys' NRL side, playing in the final four games of the season, scoring three tries.

=== 2019 ===
Gela-Mosby played just three games for the Cowboys in 2019, spending the majority of the season playing for the Northern Pride. In Round 12, he broke his collarbone in the Cowboys' win over the Gold Coast Titans.

On 13 September, it was announced that he would not be re-signed by the Cowboys.

== Achievements and accolades ==
=== Individual ===
- Auckland Nines Team of the Tournament: 2017
- NYC Team of the Year: 2015, 2016

== Statistics ==
=== NRL ===
Statistics are correct to the end of the 2019 season

Season	Team	Matches	T	G	GK %	F/G	Pts
2017	North Queensland	4	3	0	—	0	12
2018	North Queensland	4	3	0	—	0	12
2019	North Queensland	3	0	0	—	0	0
Career totals		11	6	0	—	0	24
