= Kirwan State High School =

Australian school

Coordinates: 19°18′35″S 146°44′00″E

Kirwan State High School, 2017 Annual Report

Kirwan State High School is a coeducational state school located in Kirwan, Townsville, Queensland, Australia, approximately 12 kilometres (7 mi) from the Townsville CBD. In 2017, it has 1997 students with 156 teachers (145 full-time equivalent) and 75 non-teaching staff (59 full-time equivalent), making it the largest high school in North Queensland. It is located in the former city of Thuringowa.

== History ==
The school enrolled its first student for year 8 in January 1979, and was formally opened on 3 November 1979 by Sir Llewellyn Edwards.

In 2013, the school became an independent state high school, with the ability to hire and fire its own staff.

== Sport ==
Kirwan State High School is a nationally recognised school for its performances in sport and has run a range of Sports Excellence programs which have been established for the past twelve years. In year 8, students are selected for the general Sports Excellence Program; then, in year 9, they progress to the sport-specific Excellence Programs in basketball, cricket, hockey, netball, rugby league, touch football, soccer, AFL, and volleyball. Kirwan has won 16 Queensland Championships in sports such as soccer, hockey, indoor cricket, and rugby league. Several students are enrolled in programs run by the Australian Institute of Sport and its Queensland state equivalent.

In 2006, two former students from the class of 2002, Sam Thaiday and Jacob Lillyman, gained selection in the Queensland Rugby League State of Origin team, and Brent Webb (1996) played a significant role in the 2005 Tri Nations-winning New Zealand Kiwis. Long-serving North Queensland Cowboys' hooker Aaron Payne also attended the school. Lisa Braunburger (Sports Captain 2005), has also gained selection in the Australian under 19's team and was later recruited in the Townsville Fire in the National Women's Basketball League.

Kirwan State High School is also a regular participant in the Arrive Alive Cup, a competition held for sporting excellence schools nationwide, and is also known for its rivalry with Ignatius Park College, the other leading school in Townsville Rugby League. Iggy and Kirwan host matches against each other in rugby league annually and usually draw large crowds.

== Arts ==
Kirwan has an active participation in the arts and music, and has competed consistently in the annual Rock Eisteddfod Challenge competition, winning 3rd placing in 2003. It is also known for holding musicals once a year at Townsville's premier cultural centre, the 1000 seat Townsville Civic Theatre. The students from Kirwan have presented a wide range of musicals.

Another unique offering by Kirwan is its Music Excellence program. Students apply to join the music excellence program in grade 8 and are offered extra music classes and play in specialised grade 8 music excellence ensembles.

== Notable alumni ==
- Trent Bell (born 1990) – boy band member
- Troy Thompson (born c. 1973) – Townsville mayor, 2024

=== Rugby league ===
- Dudley Dotoi (born 2003)
- Obe Geia (born 1989)
- Gideon Gela-Mosby (born 1996)
- Jacob Lillyman (born 1984)
- Micheal Luck (born 1981)
- Robert Lui (born 1990)
- Rhyse Martin (born 1993)
- Nene McDonald (born 1994)
- Kierran Moseley (born 1994)
- Aaron Payne (born 1982)
- Brandon Smith (born 1996)
- Darryn Schonig (born 1996)
- Hamiso Tabuai-Fidow (born 2001)
- Jason Taumalolo (born 1993)
- Sam Thaiday (born 1985)
- Ray Thompson (born 1990)
- Enari Tuala (born 1998)
- Brent Webb (born 1979)
