= Adam Brideson =

Australian rugby league footballer

Personal information
- Full name: Adam Brideson
- Born: 17 April 1981 (age 45) Toowoomba, Queensland, Australia

Playing information
- Height: 180 cm (5 ft 11 in)
- Weight: 92 kg (14 st 7 lb)
- Position: Second-row, Hooker
Club
Years	Team	Pld	T	G	FG	P
2002–07	Canterbury Bankstown	22	2	0	0	8

Adam Brideson (born 17 April 1981) is an Australian former professional rugby league footballer who played in the 2000s for the Canterbury Bulldogs. He is currently an assistant coach at the Brisbane Broncos under head coach Michael Maguire.

== Background ==
Brideson was born in Toowoomba, Queensland, Australia.

== Playing career ==
Brideson played his Junior Football in the Toowoomba Rugby League Team for the Southern Suburbs Tigers, Brideson usually played in the second row. Brideson made his debut for Canterbury against Canberra on 25 August 2002 and had played over 200 first grade games in Reserve Grade for the Club including being part of the 2002 reserve grade premiership winning team.

== Post playing ==
Brideson was an Australian Apprenticeships Ambassador for the Australian Government and an Apprentice Mentor in the NRL's Trade UP with the NRL Program. Brideson coached the Wynnum Manly Seagulls to the Grand Final vs the Burleigh Bears in the 2019 QLD Intrust Super Cup.
