= 2017 NRL Auckland Nines =

Rugby tournament

Tournament information
- Location: Eden Park, Auckland
- Dates: 4–5 February
- Teams: 16 Male; 2 Female

Final positions
- Champions: Sydney Roosters (1st title)
- Runner-up: Penrith Panthers

Tournament statistics
- Attendance: 22,000
- MVP: Connor Watson
- Top try scorer(s): Jordan Kahu (6); Gideon Gela-Mosby (6)

The 2017 NRL Auckland Nines (known as the Downer NRL Auckland Nines due to sponsorship) was the fourth NRL Auckland Nines competition. It was held on 4–5 February 2017 at Eden Park in Auckland, New Zealand. Just like previous tournaments, it was contested by all sixteen National Rugby League teams. The prize money was NZ$2.6 million. The draw for the competition was announced by the NRL on 17 November 2016. The same pool names were used as in the 2015 and 2016 tournaments. The pool names were: Hunua, Waiheke, Rangitoto and Piha. The event included two international women's teams, the Kiwi Ferns and the Jillaroos, who competed in a three-game series won by the Jillaroos for the first time, with a 3-0 clean sweep. The tournament was again sponsored by Downer Group. The Sydney Roosters won the tournament by defeating the Penrith Panthers 10–8 in the final.

== Tournament games ==
=== Hunua pool ===
Hunua Pool
Team	Pld	W	D	L	PF	PA	PD	Pts
North Queensland Cowboys	3	3	0	0	81	29	+52	6
Sydney Roosters	3	2	0	1	50	34	+16	4
Canberra Raiders	3	1	0	2	21	68	−47	2
South Sydney Rabbitohs	3	0	0	3	27	48	−21	0

4 February 2017	North Queensland Cowboys	27-15	Sydney Roosters	Auckland, New Zealand
12:40 AEDST				Stadium: Eden Park

4 February 2017	Canberra Raiders	15-12	South Sydney Rabbitohs	Auckland, New Zealand
13:05 AEDST				Stadium: Eden Park

4 February 2017	North Queensland Cowboys	35-6	Canberra Raiders	Auckland, New Zealand
16:35 AEDST				Stadium: Eden Park

4 February 2017	Sydney Roosters	14-7	South Sydney Rabbitohs	Auckland, New Zealand
17:00 AEDST				Stadium: Eden Park

5 February 2017	North Queensland Cowboys	19-8	South Sydney Rabbitohs	Auckland, New Zealand
11:05 AEDST	19		8	Stadium: Eden Park

5 February 2017	Sydney Roosters	21-0	Canberra Raiders	Auckland, New Zealand
11:30 AEDST	21		0	Stadium: Eden Park

=== Rangitoto pool ===
Rangitoto Pool
Team	Pld	W	D	L	PF	PA	PD	Pts
Brisbane Broncos	3	2	0	1	50	29	+21	4
Melbourne Storm	3	2	0	1	38	34	+4	4
Wests Tigers	3	1	0	2	33	43	−10	2
Newcastle Knights	3	1	0	2	36	51	−15	2

4 February 2017	Newcastle Knights	18-10	Wests Tigers	Auckland, New Zealand
11:50 AEDST				Stadium: Eden Park

4 February 2017	Brisbane Broncos	18-4	Melbourne Storm	Auckland, New Zealand
12:15 AEDST				Stadium: Eden Park

4 February 2017	Newcastle Knights	8-21	Brisbane Broncos	Auckland, New Zealand
15:45 AEDST	8		21	Stadium: Eden Park

4 February 2017	Wests Tigers	6-14	Melbourne Storm	Auckland, New Zealand
16:10 AEDST	6		14	Stadium: Eden Park

5 February 2017	Wests Tigers	17-11	Brisbane Broncos	Auckland, New Zealand
10:15 AEDST	17		11	Stadium: Eden Park

5 February 2017	Newcastle Knights	10-20	Melbourne Storm	Auckland, New Zealand
10:40 AEDST	10		20	Stadium: Eden Park

=== Waiheke pool ===
Waiheke Pool
Team	Pld	W	D	L	PF	PA	PD	Pts
Penrith Panthers	3	3	0	0	66	36	+30	6
Gold Coast Titans	3	2	0	1	46	36	+10	4
Cronulla Sharks	3	1	0	2	46	45	+1	2
Canterbury Bankstown Bulldogs	3	0	0	3	32	73	−41	0

4 February 2017	Cronulla Sharks	4 - 25	Gold Coast Titans	Auckland, New Zealand
10:00 AEDST	Tries: Kurt Capewell 10'; Conversions: Kurt Capewell 0/1	[Report Report]	Bonus Point Tries: Kane Elgey 2'; Tries: Nathaniel Peteru 4', Jarryd Hayne 6', Tyrone Roberts 14'; Conversions: Tyrone Roberts 2/5	Stadium: Eden Park

4 February 2017	Penrith Panthers	28 - 18	Canterbury Bankstown Bulldogs	Auckland, New Zealand
10:25 AEDST	Bonus Point Tries: James Tamou 4', James Tamou 15'; Tries: Kaide Ellis 6', Malakai Watene-Zelezniak 8', Malakai Watene-Zelezniak 9'; Conversions: Nathan Cleary 2/3, Zach Dockar-Clay 1/2	[Report Report]	Bonus Point Tries: Renouf To'oamaga 13', Matt Frawley 18'; Tries: Francis Tualau 3'; Conversions: Matt Frawley 1/1, Bradley Abbey 1/2	Stadium: Eden Park

4 February 2017	Cronulla Sharks	14-16	Penrith Panthers	Auckland, New Zealand
13:55 AEDST	Tries: Manaia Cherrington 5', Matt Evans 6', Manaia Cherrington 17'; Conversions: Manaia Cherrington 1/1, Gerard Beale 0/1, Wade Graham 0/1	[Report Report]	Tries: Moses Leota 9', Jed Cartwright 10', Corey Harawira-Naera 14'; Conversions: Darren Nicholls 1/1, Corey Harawira-Naera 1/2	Stadium: Eden Park

4 February 2017	Gold Coast Titans	17-10	Canterbury Bankstown Bulldogs	Auckland, New Zealand
14:20 AEDST				Stadium: Eden Park

5 February 2017	Cronulla Sharks	28-4	Canterbury Bankstown Bulldogs	Auckland, New Zealand
08:35 AEDST	28		4	Stadium: Eden Park

5 February 2017	Gold Coast Titans	4-22	Penrith Panthers	Auckland, New Zealand
09:00 AEDST	4		22	Stadium: Eden Park

=== Piha pool ===
Piha Pool
Team	Pld	W	D	L	PF	PA	PD	Pts
Parramatta Eels	3	3	0	0	66	23	+43	6
Manly Warringah Sea Eagles	3	2	0	1	50	48	+2	4
St George Illawarra Dragons	3	1	0	2	45	65	−20	2
New Zealand Warriors	3	0	0	3	21	46	−25	0

4 February 2017	St. George Illawarra Dragons	11-32	Parramatta Eels	Auckland, New Zealand
10:50 AEDST	11		32	Stadium: Eden Park

4 February 2017	New Zealand Warriors	11-15	Manly Warringah Sea Eagles	Auckland, New Zealand
15:15 AEDST	11		15	Stadium: Eden Park

4 February 2017	St. George Illawarra Dragons	20-23	Manly Warringah Sea Eagles	Auckland, New Zealand
14:45 AEDST	20		23	Stadium: Eden Park

4 February 2017	New Zealand Warriors	0-17	Parramatta Eels	Auckland, New Zealand
17:10 AEDST	0		17	Stadium: Eden Park

5 February 2017	Manly Warringah Sea Eagles	12-17	Parramatta Eels	Auckland, New Zealand
09:25 AEDST	12		17	Stadium: Eden Park

5 February 2017	New Zealand Warriors	10-14	St George Illawarra Dragons	Auckland, New Zealand
09:50 AEDST	10		14	Stadium: Eden Park

== Finals ==
Quarter-finals
Penrith Panthers	16
Manly Sea Eagles	12
Parramatta Eels	14
Gold Coast Titans	0
Brisbane Broncos	14
Sydney Roosters	15
North Queensland Cowboys	12
Melbourne Storm	25

Semi-finals
Penrith Panthers	13
Parramatta Eels	0
Sydney Roosters	21
Melbourne Storm	16

Final
Penrith Panthers	8
Sydney Roosters	10

=== Quarterfinals ===
5 February 2017	Penrith Panthers	16-12 (Golden Try)	Manly Warringah Sea Eagles	Auckland, New Zealand
11:55 AEDST	Bonus Point Tries: Waqa Blake 2', Sione Katoa 16'; Tries: Tyrone May 20'; Conversions: Corey Harawira-Naera 1/2	[Report Report]	Bonus Point Tries: Brian Kelly 7', Dylan Walker 13'; Conversions: Cameron Cullen 1/2	Stadium: Eden Park

5 February 2017	Parramatta Eels	14-0	Gold Coast Titans	Auckland, New Zealand
12:20 AEDST	Tries: Bevan French 7', Semi Radradra 13', Bevan French 16'; Conversions: Corey Norman 1/1, Clinton Gutherson 0/1, Jamal Fogarty 0/1	[Report Report]		Stadium: Eden Park

5 February 2017	Brisbane Broncos	14-15	Sydney Roosters	Auckland, New Zealand
13:05 AEDST	Tries: Jordan Kahu 12', Mitchell Cronin 14', Sam Lavea 16'; Conversions: Jordan Kahu 1/2	[Report Report]	Bonus Point Tries: Chris Smith 3'; Tries: Connor Watson 6', Ryan Matterson 8'; Conversions: Latrell Mitchell 1/3	Stadium: Eden Park

5 February 2017	North Queensland Cowboys	12-25	Melbourne Storm	Auckland, New Zealand
13:30 AEDST				Stadium: Eden Park

=== Semi-finals ===
5 February 2017	Penrith Panthers	13-0	Parramatta Eels	Auckland, New Zealand
14:40 AEDST	13		0	Stadium: Eden Park

5 February 2017	Sydney Roosters	21-16	Melbourne Storm	Auckland, New Zealand
15:05 AEDST	21		16	Stadium: Eden Park

=== Final ===
5 February 2017	Penrith Panthers	8-10	Sydney Roosters	Auckland, New Zealand
16:40 AEDST	8		10	Stadium: Eden Park

== Ferns v Jillaroos ==
4 February 2017	Kiwi Ferns	4-20	Australian Jillaroos	Auckland, New Zealand
13:30 AEDST	Try: Kani; Conversions: 0/1	[Highlights; Report Report]	Bonus Point Tries: Apps, Baker; Tries: Kelly; Conversions: 3/3	Stadium: Eden Park

5 February 2017	Kiwi Ferns	0-8	Australian Jillaroos	Auckland, New Zealand
13:55 AEDST	Nil		Tries: Baker, Bremner; Conversions: 0/2	Stadium: Eden Park

5 February 2017	Kiwi Ferns	4-14	Australian Jillaroos	Auckland, New Zealand
15:50 AEDST	Tries: Noble	[Report Report]	Tries: Kelly; Baker, Breayley; Conversions: 1/3	Stadium: Eden Park

== Team of the tournament ==
Connor Watson was named the player of the tournament. The team of the tournament was;

Player	Club
Cameron Munster	Melbourne Storm
Kalyn Ponga	North Queensland
Suaia Matagi	Parramatta Eels
Brodie Croft	Melbourne Storm
Latrell Mitchell	Sydney Roosters
Gideon Gela-Mosby	North Queensland
Connor Watson	Sydney Roosters
Waqa Blake	Penrith Panthers
Moses Leota	Penrith Panthers
