= Darryn Schonig =

Australian rugby league player

Personal information
- Born: 20 March 1996 (age 29) Cooktown, Queensland, Australia
- Height: 183 cm (6 ft 0 in)
- Weight: 112 kg (17 st 9 lb)

Playing information
- Position: Prop
Club
| Years | Team | Pld | T | G | FG | P |
|---|---|---|---|---|---|---|
| 2020–21 | Melbourne Storm | 7 | 0 | 0 | 0 | 0 |
Representative
| Years | Team | Pld | T | G | FG | P |
| 2019 | Queensland Residents | 1 | 0 | 0 | 0 | 0 |
- Source: As of 13 November 2025

Darryn “Big Diesel” Schonig (born 20 March 1996) is an Australian professional former rugby league footballer who last played as a prop for the Canterbury-Bankstown Bulldogs.

He previously played for the Melbourne Storm in the NRL.

== Background ==
Born in Cooktown, Queensland, Schonig played his junior rugby league for the Edmonton Storm and attended Kirwan State High School, where he represented the 2014 Australian Schoolboys, before being signed by the Sydney Roosters.

== Playing career ==
In 2012, Schonig played for the Northern Pride in the Cyril Connell Cup. In 2014, he played for the Sydney Roosters in the SG Ball Cup, coming off the bench in their Grand Final win over the Penrith Panthers.

In 2015, Schonig was released by the Roosters and returned to Cairns, playing for Cairns Brothers in the Cairns District Rugby League A-Grade. In 2016, he joined the North Queensland Cowboys playing 26 games for their under-20 side. In July 2016, he started at prop for the Queensland under-20 team.

In 2017, Schonig joined the Northern Pride, spending two seasons with the club. In 2019, he moved to Melbourne Storm feeder club, the Sunshine Coast Falcons, and earned an NRL contract with the club.

=== Melbourne Storm ===
In round 9 of the 2020 NRL season, Schonig made his NRL debut for the Melbourne Storm against the Canberra Raiders.

Schonig played just one game during the 2021 NRL season with a knee injury keeping him on the sidelines. He was released by Melbourne at the end of the 2021 season, rejoining the Sunshine Coast Falcons in 2022.
