= Cairns District Rugby League =

Australian sports governing body

Far North Queensland Rugby League
- Sport: Rugby league
- Instituted: 1918
- Number of teams: 8
- Country: Australia
- Premiers: Cairns Brothers (2026)
- Website: www.qrl.com.au

The Cairns District Rugby League is the administrative body for the game of rugby league football in Cairns, Queensland. Formed on 5 August 1918, the CDRL runs senior, junior and women's club competitions and has its headquarters at Barlow Park. The competition changed its name to Far North Queensland Rugby League in 2023.

The competition extends from Mossman-Port Douglas Sharks in the north, to the Tully Tigers to the south.

== Representative teams ==
Selected players from the Cairns District Rugby League, represented Cairns in representative sides called Cairns Marlins (senior team), and Cairns Crocs (junior team). The Marlins compete in the Foley Shield while the Northern Pride represents Cairns in the competitions the Queensland Cup, the Cyril Connell Cup and the Mal Meninga Cup .

== Senior Clubs ==
=== Cairns District Rugby League ===
The Cairns senior competition features eleven clubs in three grades: A-grade, reserves and colts (under 18's). All finals matches are played at Barlow Park.

| Club Name & Colours | Club Nickname | Founded | Homeground | City/Town/s | Suburb/s |
|---|---|---|---|---|---|
| Atherton | Roosters | 1918 | Atherton Showgrounds | Atherton | |
| Cairns Brothers | Leprechauns | 1926 | Stan Williams Park | Cairns | Manunda |
| Cairns | Kangaroos | 1931 | Vico Oval | Cairns | Mooroobool |
| Innisfail Brothers | Leprechauns | | Callendar Park | Innisfail | |
| Edmonton | Storm | 2026 | Petersen Park | Cairns | Edmonton |
| Ivanhoes | Knights | 1923 | Smithfield Sporting Complex | Cairns | Smithfield |
| Mossman Port Douglas | Sharks | | Mossman Showgrounds | Mossman & Port Douglas | |
| Southern Suburbs | Cockatoos | | Alley Park | Cairns | Gordonvale |
| Yarrabah | Seahawks | 2000 | Jilara Oval | Yarrabah | |
| Mareeba | Gladiators | 1923 | Davies Park | Mareeba | |
| Tully | Tigers | 1919 | Tully Showgrounds | Tully | |

=== Former Senior Clubs ===
| Club Name & Colours | Club Nickname | Founded | Ceased | Homeground | City/Town/s | Fate |
|---|---|---|---|---|---|---|
| Babinda | Colts | 1918 | 1999 | Bill Wakeham Park, Babinda | Babinda | Failed to field a senior team due to lack of numbers. |
| Edmonton | Storm | 2006 | 2025 | Petersen Park | Edmonton | Entity dissolved and removed for the 2026 season due to alleged financial non-compliance. |

The Edmonton Storm were removed by the CDRL for the 2026 Senior season due to alleged rule breaches. A separate entity known by the same name 'Edmonton Storm' was formed for the 2027 CDRL season

== Recent Grand Finals ==
Cairns & District Rugby League Grand Finals
| Year | Premiers | Score | Runners-up | Venue |
|---|---|---|---|---|
| 2017 | Yarrabah | 31 – 22 | Innisfail Brothers | Barlow Park |
| 2018 | Mossman Port Douglas | 36 – 12 | Tully Tigers | Barlow Park |
| 2019 | Mossman Port Douglas | 30 – 24 | Innisfail Brothers | Barlow Park |
| 2020 | Season Cancelled due to COVID-19 | | | N/A |
| 2021 | Yarrabah | 20 – 16 | Innisfail Brothers | Barlow Park |
| 2022 | Cairns Brothers | 26 – 24 | Mossman Port Douglas | Barlow Park |
| 2023 | Cairns Brothers | 24 – 22 | Innisfail Brothers | Barlow Park |
| 2024 | Cairns Brothers | 18 – 14 | Ivanhoes | Barlow Park |
| 2025 | Cairns Brothers | 18-12 | Southern Suburbs | Barlow Park Source: |
| 2026 | Cairns Brothers | | | |

== Cairns Juniors ==
=== Cairns District Junior Rugby League ===
The Cairns junior competition features twelve clubs in eleven grades, from under 6's to under 16's.

| Club Colours | Club Name | Club Nickname | Founded | Homeground | Suburb |
|---|---|---|---|---|---|
| | Babinda | Colts | 1918 | Bill Wakeham Park | Babinda |
| | Brothers (Cairns) | Leprechauns | | Stan Williams Park | Manunda |
| | Brothers (Innisfail) | Leprechauns | | Callendar Park | Innisfail |
| | Cairns | Kangaroos | | Vico Oval | Mooroobool |
| | Central | Scorpions | | Jones Park | Westcourt |
| | Edmonton | Storm | | Petersen Park | Edmonton |
| | Innisfail | Cowboys | | Goondi Combined Sports Complex | Innisfail |
| | Ivanhoes | Knights | | Smithfield Sporting Complex | Smithfield |
| | Redlynch | Razorbacks | | St Andrews Catholic College | Redlynch |
| | Mossman | Sharks | | Mossman Showgrounds | Mossman |
| | Southern Suburbs | Cockatoos | | Alley Park | Gordonvale |
| | Yarrabah | Seahawks | | Jilara Oval | Yarrabah |

=== Eacham Junior Rugby League ===
Eacham Junior Rugby League is the governing body for seven club junior rugby league on the Atherton Tablelands. The home grounds of Eacham Junior Rugby League are the Atherton Junior Rugby League grounds. The name of the Eacham Junior Rugby League comes from a senior competition dating back to the early twentieth which comprised senior clubs from Mareeba, Atherton, Malanda and Millaa Millaa.

| Club Colours | Club Name | Club Nickname | Founded | Homeground | Suburb |
|---|---|---|---|---|---|
| | Atherton | Roosters | | Atherton JRL Grounds | |
| | Cooktown & Districts | | | | |
| | Herberton | Magpies | | | |
| | Kuranda & Districts | | | | |
| | Malanda | Eels | | Malanda Showgrounds | |
| | Mareeba | Gladiators | | Davies Park | |
| | Ravenshoe | Tigers | | | |

=== Innisfail Junior Rugby League ===
Former 4 team competition based around Innisfail now part of the CDJRL It consisted of:
Innisfail Brothers Leprechauns,
Innisfail Cowboys,
Babinda Colts,
Tully Tigers.

== Notable players ==
=== Cairns Brothers ===
- Brad Arthur (Coach of Parramatta Eels 2012 & 2014-present)
- George Burgess (2012-19 South Sydney Rabbitohs, 2020-21 Wigan Warriors & 2022 St. George Illawarra Dragons)

=== Atherton Roosters ===
Dallas Johnson https://en.m.wikipedia.org/wiki/Dallas_Johnson

=== Cairns Kangaroos ===
- David Westley (1993–2002 Canberra Raiders, Parramatta Eels & Northern Eagles)
- Justin Hodges (2000–2015 Brisbane Broncos & Sydney Roosters)
- Ashley Graham (2002–2013 Parramatta Eels & North Queensland Cowboys)
- Brent Webb (2002–2014 NZ Warriors, Leeds Rhinos & Catalans Dragons)
- Jayden Hodges (2013– North Queensland Cowboys & Manly-Warringah Sea Eagles)
- Gideon Gela-Mosby (2017–2019 North Queensland Cowboys)
- Hamiso Tabuai-Fidow (North Queensland Cowboys & Dolphins)
- Jeremiah Nanai (North Queensland Cowboys)

=== Edmonton Storm ===
- Enari Tuala (2017- North Queensland Cowboys, Newcastle Knights & Canterbury Bulldogs)

=== Innisfail Leprechauns ===
- Ty Williams (2002–10 North Queensland Cowboys)
- Scott Bolton (2007–19 North Queensland Cowboys)
- Billy Slater (2003–18 Melbourne Storm)

=== Innisfail Souths ===
- Kerry Boustead (1979–1990 Eastern Suburbs, Manly, Hull KR & North Sydney Bears)

=== Ivanhoes Knights ===
- James Segeyaro (2011–19 North Queensland Cowboys, Penrith, Leeds, Cronulla & Brisbane).

=== Southern Suburbs ===
- Nate Myles (2005–17 Canterbury, Sydney, Gold Coast, Manly & Melbourne Storm)

=== Edmonton Storm ===
- Enari Tuala (2017– North Queensland Cowboys & Newcastle Knights)
- Darryn Schonig (2020– Melbourne Storm)

== See also ==
- Rugby League Competitions in Australia
