= Tully Tigers =

Club information
- Full name: Tully Tigers Rugby League Football Club
- Nickname: Tigers
- Colours: Orange; Black; White
- Founded: 1919

Current details
- Ground: Tully Showgrounds, Tully, Queensland
- Competition: Cairns District Rugby League

The Tully Tigers were formed in 1919 and currently field male and female teams in all junior grades of the Cairns District Rugby League. The club is based at Tully Showgrounds, Tully, Queensland.

Tully Tigers, is the local Rugby League club. One of their most famous juniors is former Cowboys forward Peter Jones. . Tully was once one of the biggest sporting hubs in Far North Queensland, but since the economic crisis has hit, they are looking for more and more ways to support their clubs.

== NRL Players ==
- Jake Clifford
- Thomas Flegler
- Peter Jones
