= 2019 Northern Pride RLFC season =

Coordinates: 16°55′49″S 145°46′2″E

Northern Pride
Club information
- Full name: Northern Pride Rugby League Football Club
- Nickname: The Pride
- Colours: Black, teal and gold
- Founded: 2007
- Website: northernpride.com.au

Current details
- Ground: Barlow Park, Cairns (seating 1,700, standing 15,000)
- CEO: Mark Quinn (2018–2020)
- Coach: Ty Williams (2017–2023)
- Captain: Tom Hancock and Dave Murphy (2019)
- Competition: Intrust Super Cup
- 2019: 12th
- Home colours

Records
- Premierships: 2 (2010, 2014)
- Runners-up: 1 (2009)
- Minor premierships: 3 (2013, 2014, 2024)

2019 was the twelfth competitive season for the Cairns based Northern Pride Rugby League Football Club. They were one of 14 clubs that played in the twenty-third season of Queensland's top rugby league competition, QRL's Intrust Super Cup, with each team playing 12 home games and 11 away games over 24 weeks between March and August.

Channel 9 continued to be the television broadcast provider, but televised games returned to Sunday afternoons, after the Saturday afternoon slot proved unpopular, with viewing figures having slumped by as much as 50,000 a game in 2018. Games were shown at noon for the first four weeks, then, when Daylight Saving Time ended in New South Wales, games were shown at 1:00pm.

This was Ty Williams' third season as coach. The Pride lost more than 500 games of QCup experience during the off-season, with the retirement of captain Ryan Ghietti (169 games), along with Brett Anderson (125+ games), Colin Wilkie, Sheldon Powe-Hobbs and Justin Castellaro. In addition, Ethan Lowe*, a Cowboys' regular, signed with the Rabbitohs, leaving another gap in the roster. The Pride signed experienced second-rower Maurice 'Bobby' Blair, and promoted several young players into the first grade squad - Steven Tatipata, Evan Child, Terrence Casey-Douglas,

Tom Hancock and Dave Murphy were named as joint co-captains. Jared Allen and Jack Campagnolo were co-captains in the second pre-season trial game.

The Pride started the season well, beating last year's premiers, Redcliffe and the PNG Hunters in the first two rounds, but then they lost the nest ten games, a club record, with a 50-10 thrashing from the SC Falcons and a 43-0 defeat by Burleigh. They managed to finish the season in a competitive fashion, pulling off a thrilling comeback to defeat Easts Tigers 18-16 in their last home game, before narrowly falling to Tweed Seagulls 12-10 in the final round. The Pride won just five games and ended up in twelfth place.

== 2019 Season - Northern Pride ==
- Competition: Intrust Super Cup.
- Sponsor: 'Mount Peter Estate' (Kenfrost Homes).

=== Staff ===
==== Coaches/Trainers ====
- Coach: Ty Williams
- Assistant Coach: Sam Obst
- Assistant Coach: Bobby Berg
- Strength & Conditioning Coach: Scott Callaghan

==== Captains ====
- Co-Captains: Tom Hancock and Dave Murphy.
- Trial game co-captains: Jared Allen and Jack Campagnolo.

==== Managers ====
- Football Operations Manager: Chey Bird
- Administration, Marketing & Memberships Member: Alannah Giuffrida
- Media Manager: Gavin Broomhead
- Gameday Commentator: Elliott Lovejoy
- Chief executive: Mark Quinn
- Chairman: Tony Williamson
- Board of Directors: Peter Parr (Cowboys), Gail Andrejic (finance), Stephen Tillett, Stephen Devenish, Terry Medhurst, Jodi Scott.

== Squad ==
The Pride used 37 players this season. Fifteen players from last year signed with the club again, six of the Cowboys allocation players from last year were assigned to the Pride again this year. Sixteen new players made their debut this season; fourteen were new signings (Cameron Torpy, Cephas Chinfat, Dominic Biondi, Evan Child, Ewan Moore, Hugh Sedger, Joe Eichner, Matolu 'Mat' Laumea, Maurice Blair, Patrick Gallen, Quinlyn Cannon, Steven Tatipata, Terrence Casey-Douglas and Tom McGrath), and two were new Cowboys allocation players (Kurt Baptiste* and Nene Macdonald*).

Tom Hancock – SR (c)
David Murphy (c)
Aidan Day – PR
Brad Lupi – PR
Bradley Stephen – CE
Brayden Torpy – HB
Cameron Torpy – LK
Cephas Chinfat – FB
Connor Jones – PR
Denzel King – HK
Dominic Biondi – LK
Evan Child – LK
Ewan Moore – SR
Hugh Sedger – SR
Jack Campagnolo – FE

Jack Murphy – FB
Jared Allen – HB
Joe Eichner – SR
Jordan Biondi-Odo – FE, HB
Mat Lauema – PR
Matthew Musumeci – FB
Maurice Blair – SR
Patrick Gallen – FE
Quinlyn Cannon – HK
Shawn Bowen – CE
Steven Tatipata – CE
Terrence Casey-Douglas – SR
Tom McGrath – LK
Will Bugden – SR

Development Players

Corey Child
Elijah Simpson
James Clark
James Dempsey
Mark Rosendale

North Queensland Cowboys allocation

Ben Hampton* – FB, CE
Enari Tuala* – WG, CE
Gideon Gela-Mosby* – FB, WG
Jake Clifford* – HB, FE
Javid Bowen* – CE, WG
Kurt Baptiste*
Nene Macdonald* – WG
Peter Hola* – PR

Allocated but did not play for the Pride in 2019:
Coen Hess – PR
Jordan McLean
Gavin Cooper
Scott Bolton – PR, SR

=== 2019 player gains ===
Player	From League	From Club
Maurice Blair	Englidh RFL Super League	Hull KR
Brayden Torpy	Intrust Super Cup	Easts Tigers re-signed
Denzel King	Intrust Super Cup	Ipswich Jets re-signed
Cameron Torpy	NRL U-20s	Canterbury-Bankstown Bulldogs
Hugh Sedger	Toowoomba Rugby League	Toowoomba Valleys Roosters
Dominic Biondi	Brisbane Rugby League	West Brisbane Panthers
Evan Child	Intrust Super Cup	Northern Pride U-20s
Steven Tatipata	Intrust Super Cup	Northern Pride U-20s
Matolu 'Mat' Laumea	CDRL	Innisfail Leprechauns
Cephas Chinfat	CDRL	Southern Suburbs
Joe Eichner	CDRL	Brothers Cairns
Tom McGrath	CDRL	Ivanhoes Knights
Terrence Casey-Douglas		Pride Development Player
Ewan Moore		Pride Development Player
Patrick Gallen		Pride Development Player
Quinlyn Cannon		Pride Development Player

=== Player losses after 2018 season ===
Player	To League	To Club
Ryan Ghietti (c)	Retired	
Brett Anderson	Retired	
Colin Wilkie	Retired	
Sheldon Powe-Hobbs	Retired	
Troy Kapea	Retired	
Justin Castellaro	Retired	
Graham Clark	Retired	
Nathan Wales	Retired	
Keelan White	Released	
Jonico Hardwick	Released to play Rugby Union	
Darryn Schonig	Intrust Super Cup	Sunshine Coast Falcons
Todd Carney	Intrust Super Premiership	North Sydney Bears

==== Cowboys no longer allocated to the Pride ====
Player	To League	To Club
Ethan Lowe*	NRL Telstra Premiership	South Sydney Rabbitohs
Emry Pere*	Intrust Super Cup	Mackay Cutters
Murray Taulagi*	Intrust Super Cup	Townsville Blackhawks

=== 2019 season launch ===
- Pre-season training: 12 November 2018.
- Pre-season Boot Camp: Mystery Destination, 1–3 February 2018
- Season launch: Mamu Link Park, Mount Peter Residential Estate, Edmonton, Saturday 2 March 2019, 10:00am-1:00pm.

=== 2019 player awards ===
5 September 2019, Brothers World of Entertainment, Manunda

- Northern Pride Player of the Year: Tom Hancock
- Players’ Player of the Year: Tom Hancock
- Members' Player of the Year: Tom Hancock
- Most improved player: Matolu Laumea
- Best Back: Matthew Musumeci
- Best Forward: Tom Hancock
- Rookie of the Year: Cephas Chinfat
- John O'Brien Perpetual Club Person of the Year: Ross McLaren and Rhonda Coghlan

==== 2019 player records ====
- Most Games: Matthew Musumeci (22).
- Most Tries: Matthew Musumeci (7).
- Most Points: Jordan Biondi-Odo (44).

=== Trial matches ===
Round	Opponent	Score	Date	Venue
Trial 1a	Mackay Cutters	CANCELLED	Saturday, 9 February 2019	Jack Manski Oval, Townsville
Trial 1b	Townsville Blackhawks	CANCELLED	Saturday, 9 February 2019	Jack Manski Oval, Townsville
Trial 2	Cairns Marlins	40 – 10	Saturday, 16 February 2019	Mossman Showgrounds, Mossman
Trial 3	Townsville Blackhawks	28 – 10	Saturday, 23 February 2019	Alley Park, Gordonvale

Pre-season Trial 1a
Saturday
9 February 2019
19:00 AEST (UTC+10)

Mackay Cutters	CANCELLED	Northern Pride

Jack Manski Oval
(Golf Links Drive, Kirwan, QLD)

Cancelled due to the Townsville Floods.

Pre-season Trial 1b
Saturday
9 February 2019
19:00 AEST (UTC+10)

Townsville Blackhawks	CANCELLED	Northern Pride

Jack Manski Oval
(Golf Links Drive, Kirwan, QLD)

Cancelled due to the Townsville Floods.

Pre-season Trial 2
Saturday
16 February 2019
17:00 AEST (UTC+10)

Northern Pride	18 – 12	CDRL Cairns Marlins
Tries: Mark Rosendale 2 Shaun Bowen 1 Bradley Stephen 1 Goals: Jack Campagnolo 1 (1 from 4)	Half-time: 12 – 0	Tries: 1 Dale Ambrym; 1 Stanley Anau Goals: 1 (1 from 2); Penalty Goal; 1

Mossman Showgrounds
(Mossman, QLD)
Attendance: 1,500

Mount Peter Estate Northern Pride: 1. Matthew Musumeci – FB 2. Steven Tatipata – WG 3. Shawn Bowen – CE 4. Bradley Stephen – CE 5. Mark Rosendale – WG 6. Jack Campagnolo – FE 7. Jared Allen – HB 8. Aidan Day – PR 9. Quinlyn Cannon – HK 10. Matthew Lauema – PR 11. Hugh Sedger – SR 12. Terrence Casey-Douglas – SR 13. Dominic Biondi – LK
Unlimited Interchange: 14. Evan Child, 15. Elijah Simpson, 16. Cameron Torpy, 17. Patrick Gallen, 18. Corey Child, 19. James Dempsey, 20. Ewan Moore.
Unavailable: Coach Ty Williams rested the majority of his senior players: co-captains Dave Murphy and Tom Hancock, Jack Murphy, Connor Jones, Brayden Torpy, Jordan Biondi-Odo, Denzel King, Will Bugden, James Clark, Maurice Blair.
Cairns Marlins Foley Shield Squad: Rhy Young, Dallas Skardon, Jacob Wallace, Rhylee Heard & Joel Dionysius (Ivanhoes Knights), Fred Koraba, Aaron Jolley, Taulata Fakelelu, Johann Turner, Dan Sagigi (Innisfail Leprechauns), Patrick Lewis (Brothers Cairns), Stanley Anau, Eddie Daniel, Joel Marama (Mossman-Port Douglas Sharks), Milton Mossman (Yarrabah Seahawks), Ian Bounghi (Edmonton Storm), Graham Clark, Ned Blackman, Jermaine Pedro (Atherton Roosters), Ben Cocciolone (Mareeba Gladiators), Dale Ambrym, Declan Booth (Cairns Kangaroos).

Pre-season Trial 3
Saturday
23 February 2019
18:00 AEST (UTC+10)

Northern Pride	28 – 10	Townsville Blackhawks
Tries: Shawn Bowen 1 Tom Hancock 1 Jared Allen 1 Connor Jones 1 Jack Campagnolo 1 Goals; Jack Campagnolo 4 (4 from 5)	Half-time: 10 – 4	Tries: 1 Bacho Salam; 1 ? Goals; Shaun Nona 1 (1 from 2)

Alley Park
(Gordonvale, QLD)
Attendance: 1,000

Mount Peter Estate Northern Pride: 1. Jack Murphy – FB 2. Steven Tatipata – WG 3. Shawn Bowen* – CE 4. Bradley Stephen – CE 5. Matthew Musemeci – WG 6. Evan Child – FE 7. Jordon Biondi-Odo – HB 8. Aiden Day – PR 9. Connor Jones – HK 10. Will Bugden – PR 11. Hugh Sedger – SR 12. Tom Hancock (c) – SR 13. Dave Murphy (c) – LK
Unlimited Interchange: 14. Denzel King, 15. Cameron Torpy, 16. Matthew Lauema, 17. Terrence Casey-Douglas, 18. Jared Allen, 19. Jack Campagnolo, 20. Maurice Blair.
Unavailable: Brayden Torpy (rested), Dominic Biondi (injured).
Townsville and District Mendi Blackhawks: 1. Nathan Traill, 2. Michael Carroll, 3. Levi Dodd, 4. Bacho Salam, 5. Thomas McCagh, 6. Samuel Martin-Savage, 7. Shaun Nona, 22. Sione Lousi, 9. Sam Murphy, 10. Daniel Beasley, 11. Cody Maughan, 12. Ryan Lloyd, 13. Kieran Quabba.
Interchange: 14. Adam Cook, 15. Campbell Duffy, 16. Chippie Korostchuk, 8. Jayden Stephens, 17. Ben Condon, 19. Michael Bell, 21. Wiremu Greig, 8. Jayden Stephens.

=== Intrust Super Cup matches ===
ROUND 1: Intrust Super Cup 2019

Saturday
9 March 2019
18:00 AEST (UTC+10)

Northern Pride	22 – 18	Redcliffe Dolphins
Tries: Tom Hancock (10') 1 Gideon Gela-Mosby* (34') 1 Shawn Bowen (53') 1 Nene Macdonald* (68') 1 Goals: Jake Clifford* (3 from 4) 3	Half-time: 12 – 4 Penalties: 14 – 12; QRL Report	Tries: 1 Taylor Brown (38'); 1 Scott Schulte (58'); 1 Nick Brown (61'); 1 Brayden Dee (75'); Goals: 1 Bryce Donovan 76' (1 from 4); 0 Cory Paix (0 from 2)

Barlow Park
(Severin Street, Parramatta Park, QLD)
Referee: Nick Pelgrave, Wyatt Raymond.

Mount Peter Estate Northern Pride: 1. Jack Murphy – FB 2. Nene Macdonald* – WG 3. Shawn Bowen – CE 4. Enari Tuala* – CE 5. Gideon Gela-Mosby* – WG 6. Jake Clifford* – FE 7. Jordan Biondi-Odo – HB 8. Aidan Day – PR 9. Connor Jones – HK 10. Will Bugden – PR 11. Hugh Sedger – SR 12. Tom Hancock (c) – SR 13. Peter Hola* – LK
Interchange: 14. Denzel King, 15. Cameron Torpy, 16. Mat Laumea, 17. Maurice Blair.
* = Cowboys allocation (5 players allocated for this match).
Unavailable: David Murphy (PCL).
Village Motors Redcliffe Dolphins: 1. Trai Fuller, 2. Josh Beehag, 3. Aaron Whitchurch, 4. Justice Utatao, 5. Jeremy Hawkins, 6. Bryce Donovan (c), 7. Cory Paix, 8. Jordan Grant, 9. Hugh Pratt, 10. Nick Brown, 16. Scott Schulte, 12. Jamil Hopoate, 13. James Taylor.
Interchange: 11. Brayden Dee, 15. Taylor Brown, 17. Harrison Smith, 20. Tom Geraghty.
* = Brisbane Broncos allocation (? players allocated for this match).
Coach: Adam Mogg.
- Note: This was the Pride debut for Hugh Sedger, Cameron Torpy, Mat Laumea and Maurice Blair (Pride Players 154-157), and North Queensland Cowboys allocation player Nene Macdonald* (Pride Player 153).

Position	Round 1 – 2019	P	W	D	L	B	For	Against	Diff	Points
6	Northern Pride	1	1	0	0	0	22	18	+4	2

ROUND 2: Intrust Super Cup 2019

Sunday
17 March 2019
15:00 PNG Pacific Time (UTC+10)

PNG Hunters	0 – 24	Northern Pride
Tries: 0 Goals: 0 Penalty Goal: 0	Half-time: 0 – 18; Penalties: 6 – 8 QRL Report	Tries: 1 Matthew Musumeci (2'); 1 Will Bugden (5'); 1 Shawn Bowen (30'); 1 Jack Murphy (54'); Goals: 3 Jake Clifford* (3 from 4); Penalty Goal: 1 Jake Clifford* (64') (1 from 1)

Oil Search Stadium
(Port Moresby, PNG)
Referee: Ethan Menchin.

Mount Peter Estate Northern Pride: 1. Jack Murphy – FB 2. Matthew Musumeci – WG 3. Shawn Bowen – CE 4. Enari Tuala* – CE 5. Gideon Gela-Mosby* – WG 6. Jake Clifford* – FE 7. Jordan Biondi-Odo – HB 8. Aidan Day – PR 9. Connor Jones – HK 10. Will Bugden – PR 17. Maurice Blair – SR 12. Tom Hancock (c) – SR 13. Peter Hola* – LK
Interchange: 11. Hugh Sedger, 15. Denzel King, 16. Cameron Torpy, 17. Mat Laumea.
* = Cowboys allocation (4 players allocated for this match).
Unavailable: David Murphy (PCL).
Pride Out: Nene Macdonald* (wing).
Pride In: Matthew Musumeci (wing).
Changes: Hugh Sedger (second row to bench), Maurice Blair (bench to second row).
SP PNG Hunters: 1. Joe Joshua, 2. Junior Rau, 3. Oti Bland Tony, 4. Adex Wera (c), 5. Gairo Kapana, 6. Charlie Simon, 7. William Mone, 8. Moses Meninga, 9. Patrick Morea, 10. Enock Maki, 11. Mckenzie Yei, 12. Daniel Tapol, 13. Junior Rop.
Interchange: 14. Nick Hasu, 15. Brandon Nima, 16. Dilbert Issac; 17. Stanton Albert.
Coach: Stanley Tepend.

Position	Round 2 – 2019	P	W	D	L	B	For	Against	Diff	Points
2	Northern Pride	2	2	0	0	0	46	18	+28	4

ROUND 3: Intrust Super Cup 2019

Saturday
23 March 2019
18:00 AEST (UTC+10)

Northern Pride	4 – 20	Townsville Blackhawks
Tries: Enari Tuala* (61') 1 Goals: 0 Penalty Goal: 0	Half-time: 0 – 10; Penalties: 10 – 6 QRL Report	Tries: 1 Tom Gilbert (17'); 1 Michael Carroll (29'); 1 Temone Power (56'); Goals: 2 Levi Dodd (2 from 3); Penalty Goal: 2 Levi Dodd (2 from 2)

Barlow Park
(Severin Street, Parramatta Park, QLD)
Referee: Daniel Schwass, Tyson Brough.

Mount Peter Estate Northern Pride: 1. Ben Hampton* – FB 2. Matthew Musumeci – WG 3. Shawn Bowen – CE 4. Enari Tuala* – CE 5. Gideon Gela-Mosby* – WG 6. Jake Clifford* – FE 7. Jordan Biondi-Odo – HB 8. Aidan Day – PR 9. Connor Jones – HK 17. Will Bugden – PR 11. Maurice Blair – SR 12. Tom Hancock (c) – SR 13. Peter Hola* – LK
Interchange: 11. Hugh Sedger, 15. Denzel King, 16. Terrence Casey-Douglas, 17. Mat Laumea.
* = Cowboys allocation (5 players allocated for this match).
Unavailable: David Murphy (PCL).
Pride Out: Jack Murphy (fullback), Cameron Torpy (bench).
Pride In: Ben Hampton* (fullback), Terrence Casey-Douglas (bench).
Townsville and District Mendi Blackhawks: 1. Nathan Traill, 2. Michael Carroll, 3. Shaun Hudson, 4. Levi Dodd, 5. Kalifa Faifai Loa, 6. Kyle Laybutt, 7. Michael Parker-Walshe, 8. Joe Boyce, 9. Krys Freeman, 22. Sione Lousi, 11. Jake Marketo, 12. Temone Power, 13. Tom Gilbert.
Interchange: 10. Corey Jensen, 14. Sam Murphy, 15. Kieran Quabba, 16. Rod Griffin.
* = North Queensland Cowboys allocation (? players allocated for this match).
Coach: Aaron Payne.
- Note: This was the Pride debut for Terrence Casey-Douglas (Pride Player 158).

Position	Round 3 – 2019	P	W	D	L	B	For	Against	Diff	Points
6	Northern Pride	3	2	0	1	0	50	38	+12	4

ROUND 4: Intrust Super Cup 2019

Saturday
30 March 2019
15:00 AEST (UTC+10)

Ipswich Jets	28 – 16	Northern Pride
Tries: Julian Christian (12') 1 Richard Pandia (17') 1 Jayden Connors (31') 1 Michael Purcell (34', 54') 2 Goals: Marmin Barba (4 from 5) 4	Half-time: 22 – 0 Penalties: 4 – 11; QRL Report	Tries: 1 Bradley Stephen (62'); 1 Matthew Musumeci (64'); 1 Enari Tuala* (77') Goals: 2 Brayden Torpy (2 from 3)

North Ipswich Reserve
(Ipswich, QLD)
Referee: Tim Rutherford.

Mount Peter Estate Northern Pride: 1. Jack Murphy – FB 2. Matthew Musumeci – WG 3. Shawn Bowen – CE 4. Enari Tuala* – CE 5. Bradley Stephen – WG 6. Jordan Biondi-Odo – FE 7. Brayden Torpy – HB 17. Maurice Blair – PR 9. Connor Jones – HK 10. Will Bugden – PR 11. Hugh Sedger – SR 12. Tom Hancock (c) – SR 13. Peter Hola* – LK
Interchange: 8. Aidan Day, 14. Kurt Baptiste*, 15. Terrence Casey-Douglas, 16. Mat Laumea.
* = Cowboys allocation (3 players allocated for this match).
Unavailable: David Murphy (PCL).
Pride Out: Ben Hampton* (fullback), Gideon Gela-Mosby* (wing), Jake Clifford* (five-eighth), Denzel King (bench).
Pride In: Jack Murphy (fullback), Bradley Stephen (wing), Brayden Torpy (halfback), Kurt Baptiste* (bench).
Changes: Jordan Biondi-Odo (halfback to five-eighth), Aidan Day (front row to bench), Maurice Blair (second row to front row), Hugh Sedger (bench to second row).
Ipswich Jets: 1. Michael Purcell, 2. Marmin Barba, 3. Rory Humphreys, 4. Richard Pandia, 5. Peter Gubb, 6. Josh Cleeland, 7. Julian Christian, 8. Tyson Lofipo, 15. Kierran Moseley, 10. Nathaniel Neale (c), 17. Billy Mcconnachie, 12. Ben White, 13. Ben Shea.
Interchange: 9. Jayden Connors, 16. Fakahoko Teutau, 19. Mitch Carpenter, 20. Rowan Winterfield.
* = Brisbane Broncos allocation (? players allocated for this match).
Coach: Ben Walker & Shane Walker.
- Note: This was the Pride debut for North Queensland Cowboys allocation player Kurt Baptiste* (Pride Player 159).

Position	Round 4 – 2019	P	W	D	L	B	For	Against	Diff	Points
8	Northern Pride	4	2	0	2	0	66	66	0	4

ROUND 5: Intrust Super Cup 2019

Saturday
6 April 2019
13:00 AEST (UTC+10)

SC Falcons	50 – 10	Northern Pride
Tries: Sandor Earl (5', 12', 53') 3 Justin Olam (8') 1 Lachlan Roe (30') 1 Chris Lewis (35') 1 Jon Reuben (42', 65') 2 Todd Murphy (47', 68') 2 Goals: Todd Murphy (5 from 10) 5	Half-time: 24 – 0 Penalties: 7 – 6 QRL Report	Tries: 1 Dominic Biondi (61'); 1 Connor Jones (74') Goals: 1 Brayden Torpy (62') (1 from 2)

Sunshine Coast Stadium
(Sportsmans Parade, Bokarina, Kawana Waters, QLD)
Referee: Ethan Menchin.

Mount Peter Estate Northern Pride: 1. Jack Murphy – FB 2. Matthew Musumeci – WG 3. Shawn Bowen – CE 4. Enari Tuala* – CE 5. Bradley Stephen – WG 6. Brayden Torpy – FE 7. Jordan Biondi-Odo – HB 8. Aidan Day – PR 9. Connor Jones – HK 10. Will Bugden – PR 12. Tom Hancock (c) – SR 17. Maurice Blair – SR 13. Peter Hola* – LK
Interchange: 14. Kurt Baptiste*, 15. Terrence Casey-Douglas, 16. Mat Laumea, 18. Dominic Biondi.
* = Cowboys allocation (3 players allocated for this match).
Unavailable: David Murphy (PCL).
Pride Out: Hugh Sedger (second row).
Pride In: Dominic Biondi (bench).
Changes: Jordan Biondi-Odo (five-eighth to halfback), Brayden Torpy (halfback to five-eighth), Maurice Blair (front row to second row), Aidan Day (bench to front row).
Sunshine Coast Falcons: 1. Nicho Hynes, 2. Sandor Earl, 3. Justin Olam, 4. Sitiveni Moceidreke, 5. Jonathon Reuben, 6. Cooper Johns, 7. Todd Murphy, 15. Daniel Dole, 9. Harry Grant, 10. Darryn Schonig, 13. Joe Stimson, 12. Chris Lewis, 11. Dane Hogan (c).
Interchange: 14. Sam Burns, 16. Lachlan Roe, 17. Tino Fa'asuamaleaui, 18. Martin Cordwell.
* = Melbourne Storm allocation (? players allocated for this match).
Coach: Eric Smith.
- Note: This was the Pride debut for Dominic Biondi (Pride Player 160).

Position	Round 5 – 2019	P	W	D	L	B	For	Against	Diff	Points
9	Northern Pride	5	2	0	3	0	76	116	-40	4

ROUND 6: Intrust Super Cup 2019

Saturday
April 2019
18:00 AEST (UTC+10)

Northern Pride	12 – 16	SL Magpies
Tries: Tom Hancock (10') 1 Aidan Day (62') 1 Goals: Brayden Torpy (2 from 2) 2	Half-time: 0 – 16; Penalties: 9 – 5 QRL Report	Tries: 2 Matt Soper-Lawler (14', 22'); 1 Mitch Frei (17'); Goals: 2 Guy Hamilton (2 from 3)

Barlow Park
(Severin Street, Parramatta Park, QLD)
Referee: Jacob Whitehouse.

Mount Peter Estate Northern Pride: 1. Jared Allen – FB 2. Matthew Musumeci – WG 3. Shawn Bowen – CE 4. Javid Bowen* – CE 5. Jack Murphy – WG 6. Brayden Torpy – FE 7. Jack Campagnolo – HB 16. Mat Laumea – PR 9. Connor Jones – HK 10. Will Bugden – PR 11. Maurice Blair – SR 12. Tom Hancock (c) – SR 13. Peter Hola* – LK
Interchange: 8. Aiden Day, 14. Jordan Biondi-Odo, 15. David Murphy (c) 17. Hugh Sedger.
* = Cowboys allocation (2 players allocated for this match).
Pride Out: Enari Tuala* (centre), Bradley Stephen (wing), Kurt Baptiste* (bench), Terrence Casey-Douglas (bench), Dominic Biondi (bench).
Pride In: Jared Allen (fullback), Javid Bowen* (centre), Jack Campagnolo (halfback), David Murphy (bench), Hugh Sedger (bench).
Changes: Jack Murphy (fullback to wing), Jordan Biondi-Odo (halfback to bench), Aidan Day (front row to bench), Mat Laumea (bench to front row).
Souths Logan Magpies: 1. Gerome Burns, 2. Linc Port, 3. Tesi Niu, 4. Cameron Booth, 5. Matt Soper-Lawler, 6. Guy Hamilton (c), 7. Tanah Boyd, 17. Patrick Mago, 9. Manaia Cherrington, 10. Harrison Muller, 11. Mitchell Frei, 12. Brendon Gibb, 13. Shaun Fensom.
Interchange: 8. Jerome Veve, 14. Rory Ferguson, 15. Phil Dennis, 16. Sam Tagataesel.
* = Brisbane Broncos allocation (? players allocated for this match).
Coach: Jon Buchanan.

Position	Round 6 – 2019	P	W	D	L	B	For	Against	Diff	Points
9	Northern Pride	6	2	0	4	0	68	132	-44	4

ROUND 7: Intrust Super Cup 2019

Thursday
18 April 2019
18:00 AEST (UTC+10)

Northern Pride	18 – 26	WM Seagulls
Tries: Steven Tatipata (25') 1 Jack Murphy (37') 1 Peter Hola* (68') 1 Goals: Brayden Torpy (3 from 3) 3	Half-time: 12 – 20; Penalties: 7 – 7 QRL Report	Tries: 1 Sam Scarlett (7'); 2 Edward Burns (12', 18'); 1 Kalolo Saitaua (28'); 1 Edene Gebbie (45'); Goals: 3 Tom Dearden (3 from 5)

Barlow Park
(Severin Street, Parramatta Park, QLD)
Referee: Tim Rutherford.

Mount Peter Estate Northern Pride: 1. Jared Allen – FB 2. Matthew Musumeci – WG 3. Shawn Bowen – CE 4. Steven Tatipata – CE 5. Jack Murphy – WG 6. Brayden Torpy – FE 7. Jack Campagnolo – HB 8. Aidan Day – PR 9. Connor Jones – HK 17. Hugh Sedger – PR 11. Maurice Blair – SR 12. Tom Hancock (c) – SR 13. Peter Hola* – LK
Interchange: 10. David Murphy (c) 14. Jordan Biondi-Odo, 19. Terrence Casey-Douglas, 20. Mat Laumea.
* = Cowboys allocation (1 player allocated for this match).
Pride Out: Javid Bowen* (centre), Will Bugden (front row).
Pride In: Steven Tatipata (centre), Terrence Casey-Douglas (bench).
Changes: Mat Laumea (front row to bench), Aidan Day (bench to front row), Hugh Sedger (bench to front row).
Wynnum-Manly Seagulls: 1. Edene Gebbie, 2. Edward Burns, 18. Jordan Drew, 4. Junior Pauga, 5. Richard Kennar, 6. Tom Dearden, 7. Sam Scarlett, 8. Aaron Rockley, 9. Mitch Cronin (c), 10. Max Elliott, 11. Matiu Love-Henry, 16. Keenan Palasia, 20. Kalolo Saitaua.
Interchange: 12. Salesi Funaki, 14. Jayden Berrell, 15. Kelly Tate, 17. Patrick Sipley.
* = Brisbane Broncos allocation (? players allocated for this match).
Coach: Adam Brideson.
- Note: This was the Pride debut for Steven Tatipata (Pride Player 161).

Position	Round 7 – 2019	P	W	D	L	B	For	Against	Diff	Points
11	Northern Pride	7	2	0	5	0	106	158	-52	4

ROUND 8: Intrust Super Cup 2019

Saturday
27 April 2019
17:00 AEST (UTC+10)

Norths Devils	32 – 16	Northern Pride
Tries: Michael Sio (8', 41') 2 Luke Pollock (21') 1 Brendan Frei (44') 1 Paul Ulberg (52') 1 Ethan Bullemor (60') 1 Goals: Sean O'Sullivan (3 from 6) 3	Half-time: 14 – 4 Penalties: 6 – 5 QRL Report	Tries: 1 Steven Tatipata (38'); 1 Shawn Bowen (69'); 1 Connor Jones (75') Goals: 2 Brayden Torpy (2 from 3)

Suncorp Stadium
(Milton, Brisbane, QLD)
Referee: Ben Watts, Dan Munroe.

Mount Peter Estate Northern Pride: 1. Gideon Gela-Mosby* – FB 2. Matthew Musumeci – WG 3. Shawn Bowen – CE 4. Javid Bowen* – CE 5. Steven Tatipata – WG 6. Evan Child – FE 7. Brayden Torpy – HB 8. Mat Laumea – PR 9. Connor Jones – HK 10. Will Bugden – PR 11. Hugh Sedger – SR 12. Peter Hola* – SR 13. David Murphy (c) – LK
Interchange: 14. Denzel King, 15. Terrence Casey-Douglas, 16. Aidan Day, 17. Maurice Blair.
* = Cowboys allocation (3 players allocated for this match).
Pride Out: Jared Allen (fullback), Jack Murphy (wing), Jack Campagnolo (halfback), Tom Hancock (second row), Jordan Biondi-Odo (bench).
Pride In: Gideon Gela-Mosby* (fullback), Javid Bowen* (centre), Evan Child (five-eighth), Will Bugden (front row), Denzel King (bench).
Changes: Steven Tatipata (centre to wing), Brayden Torpy (five-eighth to halfback), Aidan Day (front row to bench), Hugh Sedger (front row to second row), Maurice Blair (second row to bench), Peter Hola* (lock to second row), David Murphy (bench to lock), Mat Laumea (bench to front row).
Norths Devils: 1. Jack Ahearn (c), 2. Paul Ulberg, 3. Henry Penn, 4. Connor Broadhurst, 5. Luke Pollock, 6. Troy Dargan, 7. Sean O'sullivan, 8. Riley Leota, 9. Calum Gahan, 10. Jamayne Taunoa-Brown, 11. Brendan Frei, 12. Brandon Lee, 13. Michael Sio.
Interchange: 14. David Fauid, 15. Ethan Bullemor, 17. Jordan Riki, 18. Brad Lupi.
* = Brisbane Broncos allocation (? players allocated for this match).
Coach: Rohan Smith.
- Note: This was the Pride debut for Evan Child (Pride Player 162).

Position	Round 8 – 2019	P	W	D	L	B	For	Against	Diff	Points
11	Northern Pride	8	2	0	6	0	122	190	=68	4

ROUND 9: Intrust Super Cup 2019

Saturday
4 May 2019
18:00 AEST (UTC+10)

Mackay Cutters	22 – 6	Northern Pride
Tries: Emry Pere* (14') 1 Yamba Bowie (21') 1 Jack Hickson (67') 1 Reuben Cotter* (77') 1 Goals: Carlin Anderson (3 from 4) 3	Half-time: 12 – 0 Penalties: 4 – 5 Sin bin: Will Bugden; Sent off: Javid Bowen* ----- QRL Report	Tries: 1 Shawn Bowen (47') Goals: 1 Jake Clifford* (48') (1 from 1)

BB Print Stadium
(Bridge Road, South Mackay, QLD)
Referee: Nick Pelgrave.

Mount Peter Estate Northern Pride: 6. Jordan Biondi-Odo – FB 1. Gideon Gela-Mosby* – WG 3. Javid Bowen* – CE 5. Shawn Bowen – CE 2. Matthew Musumeci – WG 19. Jake Clifford* – FE 7. Brayden Torpy – HB 10. Will Bugden – PR 9. Connor Jones – HK 15. Mat Laumea – PR 11. Ewan Moore – SR 13. Peter Hola* – SR 12. Tom Hancock (c) – LK
Interchange: 8. David Murphy, 14. Denzel King, 16. Aidan Day, 17. Hugh Sedger.
* = Cowboys allocation (4 players allocated for this match).
Pride Out: Steven Tatipata (wing), Evan Child (five-eighth), Terrence Casey-Douglas (bench), Maurice Blair (bench)
Pride In: Jordan Biondi-Odo (fullback), Jake Clifford* (five-eighth), Ewan Moore (second row), Tom Hancock (lock)
Changes: Gideon Gela-Mosby* (fullback to wing), Hugh Sedger (second row to bench), David Murphy (lock to bench)
Mackay Cutters: 1. Carlin Anderson, 2. Yamba Bowie, 3. Daniel Russell, 4. Jayden Batchelor, 5. Paul Byrnes, 6. Jack Hickson, 7. Jayden Hodges (c), 16. Emry Pere, 9. Reuben Cotter, 10. Ross Bella, 11. Shane Wright, 12. Mitchell Dunn, 13. Jordan Kenworthy.
Interchange: 8. Alex Gerrard, 15. Brenden Treston, 17. Sam Johnstone, 18. Jack Brock.
* = North Queensland Cowboys allocation (? players allocated for this match).
Coach: Steve Sheppard.
- Note: This was the Pride debut for Ewan Moora (Pride Player 163).

Position	Round 9 – 2019	P	W	D	L	B	For	Against	Diff	Points
10	Northern Pride	9	2	0	7	0	128	212	-84	4

ROUND 10: Intrust Super Cup 2019

Saturday
18 May 2019
18:00 AEST (UTC+10)

Northern Pride	0 – 43	Burleigh Bears
Tries: Goals: Penalty Goal:	Half-time: 0 – 19; Penalties: 7 – 4 QRL Report	Tries: 1 Pat Politoni (13'); 1 Kurtis Rowe (25'); 1 Jamal Fogarty (28'); 1 Josh Rogers (42'); 2 Tyronne Roberts-Davis (46', 66'); 1 Sami Sauiluma (57'); 1 Troy Leo (76'); Goals: 4 Jamal Fogarty (4 from 8); Penalty Goal: 1 Jamal Fogarty (3') (1 from 1)

Barlow Park
(Severin Street, Parramatta Park, QLD)
Referee: Ethan Menchin.

Mount Peter Estate Northern Pride: 1. Gideon Gela-Mosby* – FB 2. Matthew Musumeci – WG 3. Javid Bowen* – CE 4. Brayden Torpy – CE 5. Shawn Bowen – WG 6. Jake Clifford* – FE 7. Jack Campagnolo – HB 8. David Murphy (c) – PR 9. Connor Jones – HK 10. Will Bugden – PR 11. Ewan Moore – SR 12. Tom Hancock (c) – SR 13. Peter Hola* – LK
Interchange: 14. Jordan Biondi-Odo, 15. Mat Laumea, 16. Aidan Day, 19. Cameron Torpy.
* = Cowboys allocation (4 players allocated for this match).
Pride Out: Denzel King (bench), Hugh Sedger (bench).
Pride In: Jack Campagnolo (halfback), Cameron Torpy (bench).
Changes: Jordan Biondi-Odo (fullback to bench), Shawn Bowen (centre to wing), Gideon Gela-Mosby* (wing to fullback), Brayden Torpy (halfback to centre), Mat Laumea (front row to bench), Peter Hola* (second row to lock), Tom Hancock (lock to second row), David Murphy (bench to front row)
Burleigh Bears: 1. Kurtis Rowe, 2. Troy Leo, 3. Sami Sauiluma, 4. Brenko Lee, 5. Tyronne Roberts-Davis, 6. Josh Rogers, 7. Jamal Fogarty, 8. Luke Page (c), 9. Pat Politoni, 10. Jack Buchanan, 11. Hayden Schwass, 12. Jacob Hind, 13. Sam Coster.
Interchange: 14. Dylan Phythian, 15. Josh Ailaomai, 17. Jeff Lynch, 18. Darius Farmer.
* = Gold Coast Titans allocation (? players allocated for this match).
Coach: Jim Lenihan.

Position	Round 10 – 2019	P	W	D	L	B	For	Against	Diff	Points
11	Northern Pride	10	2	0	8	0	128	255	-127	4

ROUND 11: Intrust Super Cup 2019

Saturday
25 May 2019
16:00 AEST (UTC+10)

Northern Pride	14 – 30	Tweed Heads Seagulls
Tries: Ewan Moore (66') 1 Peter Hola* (72') 1 Jake Clifford* (74') 1 Goals: Jake Clifford* (1 from 3) 1 Penalty Goal:	Half-time: 0 – 12; Penalties: 10 – 7 Sin bin: Lamar Liolevave; QRL Report	Tries: 2 Talor Walters (27', 78'); 2 Xavier Coates (38', 48'); 1 Ryley Jacks (45'); Goals: 4 (4 from 5); Penalty Goal: 1 Lindon McGrady (32') (1 from 1)

Vico Oval
(Mooroobool, QLD)
Referee: Tim Rutherford.

Mount Peter Estate Northern Pride: 19. Enari Tuala* – FB 2. Matthew Musumeci – WG 3. Javid Bowen* – CE 4. Brayden Torpy – CE 5. Shawn Bowen – WG 1. Jack Murphy – FE 6. Jake Clifford* – HB 8. David Murphy (c) – PR 9. Connor Jones – HK 10. Will Bugden – PR 11. Ewan Moore – SR 12. Tom Hancock (c) – SR 13. Peter Hola* – LK
Interchange: 7. Jack Campagnolo, 14. Dominic Biondi, 15. Mat Laumea, 17. Cameron Torpy.
* = Cowboys allocation (4 players allocated for this match).
Pride Out: Gideon Gela-Mosby* (fullback), Jordan Biondi-Odo (bench), Aidan Day (bench).
Pride In: Enari Tuala* (fullback), Jack Murphy (five-eighth), Dominic Biondi (bench).
Changes: Jake Clifford* (five-eighth to halfback), Jack Campagnolo (halfback to bench).
Tweed Seagulls 1. Talor Walters, 2. Ryland Jacobs, 3. Ioane Seiuli, 4. Treymain Spry, 5. Xavier Coates, 6. Lindon Mcgrady, 7. Ryley Jacks, 16. Max King, 9. Christian Hazard, 10. John Palavi (C), 11. Lamar Liolevave, 12. Kalani Going, 13. Cheyne Whitelaw.
Interchange: 18. Kirk Murphy, 20. Bayley Faull, 21. Liam Hampson, 22. Will Matthews.
* = Gold Coast Titans allocation (4 players allocated for this match).
Coach: Ben Woolf.

Position	Round 11 – 2019	P	W	D	L	B	For	Against	Diff	Points
12	Northern Pride	11	2	0	9	0	142	285	-154	4

ROUND 12: Intrust Super Cup 2019

Saturday
1 June 2019
15:00 AEST (UTC+10)

Easts Tigers	40 – 22	Northern Pride
Tries: Josh Ralph (17') 1 Albert Vete (22') 1 Sam Lavea (50') 1 Bennett Leslie (66') 1 Chris Ostwald (70') 1 Matt Cooper (73') 1 Patrick Kaufusi (76') 1 Goals: Tom Hughes (6 from 7) 6	Half-time: 12 – 10; Penalties: 9 – 3 QRL Report	Tries: 1 Enari Tuala* (14'); 1 Matthew Musumeci (38'); 1 Ewan Moore (45'; 1 Cameron Torpy (62') Goals: 3 Brayden Torpy (3 from 4)

Totally Workwear Stadium
(Stones Corner, Brisbane, QLD)
Referee: Ben Watts.

Mount Peter Estate Northern Pride: 1. Jack Murphy – FB 2. Matthew Musumeci – WG 3. Javid Bowen* – CE 4. Enari Tuala* – CE 5. Shawn Bowen – WG 6. Jordan Biondi-Odo – FE 7. Brayden Torpy – HB 10. Will Bugden – PR 9. Connor Jones – HK 15. Mat Laumea – PR 11. Ewan Moore – SR 12. Tom Hancock (c) – SR 13. Cameron Torpy – LK
Interchange: 8. David Murphy (c) 14. Jack Campagnolo, 16. Aidan Day, 17. Dominic Biondi.
* = Cowboys allocation (2 players allocated for this match).
Pride Out: Jake Clifford* (halfback), Peter Hola* (lock).
Pride In: Jordan Biondi-Odo (five-eighth), Aidan Day (bench).
Changes: Enari Tuala* (fullback to centre), Brayden Torpy (centre to halfback), Jack Murphy (five-eighth to fullback), David Murphy (front row to bench), Mat Laumea (bench to front row), Cameron Torpy (bench to lock).
Eastern Suburbs Tigers 1. Scott Drinkwater, 2. Tom Hughes, 3. Matt Cooper, 15. Bennett Leslie, 5. Jarrod Mcinally, 6. Josh Ralph, 7. Rhys Jacks, 8. Brett Greinke, 9. Chris Ostwald, 10. Albert Vete, 11. Jack Svendsen, 12.Patrick Kaufusi, 13. Tyrone Amey.
Interchange: 4. Maxwell Fesolai, 14. Sam Foster, 16. John Puna, 17. Sam Lavea.
* = Melbourne Storm allocation (? players allocated for this match).
Coach: Scott Sipple.

Position	Round 12 – 2019	P	W	D	L	B	For	Against	Diff	Points
12	Northern Pride	12	2	0	10	0	164	325	-161	4

ROUND 13: Intrust Super Cup 2019

Saturday
2019
18:00 AEST (UTC+10)

Northern Pride	30 – 4	CQ Capras
Tries: Peter Hola* (8') 1 Connor Jones (32', 35') 2 Javid Bowen* (44') 1 Matthew Musumeci (67', 70') 2 Goals: Jordan Biondi-Odo (2 from 3) 2 Brayden Torpy (1 from 3) 1 Penalty Goal:	Half-time: 14 – 0 Penalties: 6 – 8 QRL Report	Tries: 1 George Grant (57') Goals: 1 Bessie Toomaga (0 from 2) Penalty Goal: (0 from 1)

Barlow Park
(Severin Street, Parramatta Park, QLD)
Referee: Ethan Menchin.

Mount Peter Estate Northern Pride: 2. Matthew Musumeci – FB 1. Jack Murphy – WG 3. Javid Bowen* – CE 4. Bradley Stephen – CE 5. Shawn Bowen – WG 6. Jordan Biondi-Odo – FE 14. Jack Campagnolo – HB 10. Will Bugden – PR 9. Brayden Torpy – PR 15. Mat Laumea – HK 11. Ewan Moore – SR 12. Tom Hancock (c) – SR 13. Peter Hola* – LK
Interchange: 8. David Murphy (c) – PR 9. Connor Jones, – HK 16. Aidan Day, 17. Cameron Torpy.
* = Cowboys allocation (2 players allocated for this match).
Pride Out: Enari Tuala* (centre), Dominic Biondi (bench).
Pride In: Bradley Stephen (centre), Peter Hola* (lock).
Changes: Jack Murphy (fullback to wing), Matthew Musumeci (wing to fullback), Brayden Torpy (halfback to hooker), Connor Jones (hooker to bench), Cameron Torpy (lock to bench), Jack Campagnolo (bench to halfback).
Central Qld Capras 1. Elijah Anderson, 2. Luke George, 3. Bessie Toomaga, 4. Nathan Bassani, 5. Troyson Bassini, 6. Kainoa Gudgeon, 7. Jack Madden (c), 8. Eddy Pettybourne, 9. George Grant, 10. Aaron Pene, 11. Chalice Atoi, 12. Sione Veukiso, 13. Jamie Hill.
Interchange: 14. Billy Gilbert, 15. Shaun Ezzy, 16. Ryan Jeffery, 17. Josh Johnstone.
Coach: David Faiumu.

Position	Round 13 – 2019	P	W	D	L	B	For	Against	Diff	Points
11	Northern Pride	13	3	0	10	0	194	329	-135	6

ROUND 14: Intrust Super Cup 2019

Saturday
16 June 2019
13:10 AEST (UTC+10)

Redcliffe Dolphins	20 – 12	Northern Pride
Tries: Josh Beehag (39') 1 Cory Paix (42', 54") 2 Trai Fuller (50') 1 Goals: Bryce Donovan (2 from 2) 2	Half-time: 4 – 0 Penalties: 3 – 9 QRL Report	Tries: 1 Jack Campagnolo (56'); 1 Quinlyn Cannon (65') Goals: 2 Jordan Biondi-Odo (2 from 2)

Moreton Daily Stadium
(Klingner Road, Redcliffe, QLD)
Referee: Ethan Menchin, Ben Watts.

Mount Peter Estate Northern Pride: 1. Jack Murphy – FB 2. Matthew Musumeci – WG 3. Brayden Torpy – CE 4. Bradley Stephen – CE 5. Shawn Bowen – WG 6. Jordan Biondi-Odo – FE 7. Jack Campagnolo – HB 10. Will Bugden – PR 9. Connor Jones – HK 16. Mat Laumea – PR 11. Ewan Moore – SR 12. Tom Hancock (c) – SR 13. Peter Hola* – LK
Interchange: 8. David Murphy (c) 14. Quinlyn Cannon, 15. Aidan Day, 17. Cameron Torpy.
* = Cowboys allocation (1 player allocated for this match).
Pride Out: Javid Bowen*
Pride In: Quinlyn Cannon.
Redcliffe Dolphins 1. Trai Fuller, 2. Justice Utatao, 3. Izaia Perese, 4. Jeremy Hawkins, 5. Josh Beehag, 6. Bryce Donovan (c), 7. Cory Paix, 8. Jordan Grant, 9. Hugh Pratt, 10. Nathan Watts, 11. Aaron Whitchurch, 12. Asipeli Fine, 13. Jamil Hopoate.
Interchange: 15. Taylor Brown, 16. Tom Geraghty, 17. Sheldon Pitama, 25. Harrison Smith.
* = Brisbane Broncos allocation (? players allocated for this match).
Coach: Adam Mogg.
- Note: This was the Pride debut for Quinlyn Cannon (Pride Player 164).

Position	Round 14 – 2019	P	W	D	L	B	For	Against	Diff	Points
12	Northern Pride	14	3	0	11	0	206	349	-143	6

ROUND 15: Intrust Super Cup 2019

Saturday
30 June 2019
13:10 AEST (UTC+10)

Northern Pride	34 – 14	Papua New Guinea Hunters
Tries: Peter Hola* (7') 1 Cephas Chinfat (13') 1 David Murphy (23') 1 Bradley Stephen (55') 1 Javid Bowen* (65') 1 Jordan Biondi-Odo (72') 1 Goals: Jordan Biondi-Odo (4 from 6) 4 Penalty Goal: Jordan Biondi-Odo (40') (1 from 1) 1	Half-time: – Penalties: 8 – 6 QRL Report	Tries: 1 Daniel Tapol (2'); 1 Shane Nigel (49'); 1 Keven Appo (77') Goals: 1 Ase Boas (1 from 3); Penalty Goal:

Barlow Park
(Severin Street, Parramatta Park, QLD)
Referee: Belinda Sharpe, Ethan Menchin

Mount Peter Estate Northern Pride: 1. Cephas Chinfat – FB 2. Matthew Musumeci – WG 3. Javid Bowen* – CE 4. Bradley Stephen – CE 5. Shawn Bowen – WG 6. Jordan Biondi-Odo – FE 7. Brayden Torpy – HB 10. Will Bugden – PR 9. Jack Campagnolo – HK 15. Cameron Torpy – PR 11. Terrence Casey-Douglas – SR 12. Tom Hancock (c) – SR 13. Peter Hola* – LK
Interchange: 8. David Murphy (c) 9. Connor Jones, 16. Aidan Day, 17. Mat Laumea.
* = Cowboys allocation (2 players allocated for this match).
Pride Out: Jack Murphy (fullback), Ewan Moore (second row), Quinlyn Cannon (bench).
Pride In: Cephas Chinfat (fullback), Javid Bowen* (centre), Terrence Casey-Douglas (second row).
Changes: Brayden Torpy (centre to halfback), Jack Campagnolo (halfback to hooker), Mat Laumea (front row to bench), Connor Jones (hooker to bench), Cameron Torpy (bench to front row).
SP PNG Hunters 1. Terry Wapi, 2. Shane Nigel, 3. Adex Wera, 4. Paul Wawa, 5. Butler Morris, 6. Ase Boas, 7. Nick Hasu, 8. Moses Meninga (c), 9. Silas Gahuna, 10. Enock Maki, 11. Daniel Tapol, 12. Epel Kapinias, 13. Ila Alu.
Interchange: 14. Patrick Morea, 15. Woods Kawage, 16. Charlie Simon, 17. Keven Appo.
Coach: Stanley Tepend.
- Note: This was the Pride debut for Cephas Chinfat (Pride Player 165).

Position	Round 15 – 2019	P	W	D	L	B	For	Against	Diff	Points
11	Northern Pride	15	4	0	11	0	240	363	-123	8

ROUND 16: Intrust Super Cup 2019

Saturday
6 July 2019
18:00 AEST (UTC+10)

Northern Pride	8 – 52	SC Falcons
Tries: Tom Hancock (21') 1 Goals: Jordan Biondi-Odo (23') (1 from 1) 1 Penalty Goal: Jordan Biondi-Odo (3') (1 from 1) 1	Half-time: 8 – 18; Penalties: 6 – 8 Sent Off: Terrence Casey-Douglas; QRL Report	Tries: 1 Nat McGavin (10'); 1 Darryn Schonig (15'); 2 Harry Grant (27', 62'); 1 Lachlan Roe (48'); 3 Jon Reuben (53', 66;, 78'); 1 Dane Hogan (75'); Goals: 8 Todd Murphy (8 from 9); Penalty Goal:

Barlow Park
(Severin Street, Parramatta Park, QLD)
Referee: Jarrod Cole.

Mount Peter Estate Northern Pride: 1. Cephas Chinfat – FB 2. Matthew Musumeci – WG 3. Javid Bowen* – CE 4. Enari Tuala* – CE 5. Shawn Bowen – WG 6. Jordan Biondi-Odo – FE 7. Brayden Torpy – HB 10. Will Bugden – PR 9. Jack Campagnolo – HK 15. Cameron Torpy – PR 11. Terrence Casey-Douglas – SR 12. Tom Hancock (c) – SR 13. Peter Hola* – LK
Interchange: 9. David Murphy (c) 14. Quinlyn Cannon, 16. Aidan Day, 17. Brad Lupi.
* = Cowboys allocation (3 players allocated for this match).
Pride Out: Bradley Stephen (centre), Connor Jones (bench), Mat Laumea (bench).
Pride In: Enari Tuala* (centre), Quinlyn Cannon (bench), Brad Lupi (bench).
Sunshine Coast Falcons 1. Nicho Hynes, 2. Nat McGavin, 3. Nathan Saumalu, 4. Sitiveni Moceidreke, 5. Jonathon Reuben, 6. Caleb Daunt, 7. Todd Murphy, 18. Daniel Dole, 9. Harry Grant, 10. Darryn Schonig, 11. Dane Hogan (c), 12. Chris Lewis, 13. Sam Burns.
Interchange: 14. Dalton Phillips, 15. Sam Bernstrom, 16. Lachlan Roe, 19. Trent Schaumkel.
* = Melbourne Storm allocation (? players allocated for this match).
Coach: Eric Smith.

Position	Round 16 – 2019	P	W	D	L	B	For	Against	Diff	Points
11	Northern Pride	16	4	0	12	0	248	415	-167	8

ROUND 17: Intrust Super Cup 2019

Saturday
13 July 2019
16:00 AEST (UTC+10)

Townsville Blackhawks
Tries:
Kalifa Faifai-Loa (2', 71') 2
Michael Bell (6', 17') 2
Jaelen Feeney (8') 1
Josh Chudleigh (13', 25') 2
Bacho Salam (32') 1
Temone Power (45', 65') 2

Jake Marketo (56') 1
Goals:
Shaun Nona (7 from 10) 1
Kyle Laybutt (1 from 1) 1

60 – 6
Half-time:
36 – 0
Penalties:9
2 –
Sin bins:
Tom Gilbert
Josh Chudleigh
Terrence Casey-Douglas
Mat Laumea
QRL Report

Northern Pride
Tries:
1 Jordan Biondi-Odo (60')

Goals:
1 Jordan Biondi-Odo (61') (1 from 1)

Jack Manski Oval
(Golf Links Drive, Kirwan, QLD)
Referee: Ben Watts.

Mount Peter Estate Northern Pride: 1. Cephas Chinfat – FB 2. Shawn Bowen – WG 3. Enari Tuala* – CE 4. Bradley Stephen – CE 5. Matthew Musumeci – WG 6. Jordan Biondi-Odo – FE 7. Brayden Torpy – HB 8. Mat Laumea – PR 9. Jack Campagnolo – HK 10. Cameron Torpy – PR 11. Terrence Casey-Douglas – SR 12. Tom Hancock (c) – SR 13. Peter Hola* – LK
Interchange: 10. David Murphy (c) 14. Quinlyn Cannon, 16. Aidan Day, 17. Maurice Blair.
* = Cowboys allocation (2 players allocated for this match).
Pride Out: Javid Bowen* (centre), Will Bugden (front row), Brad Lupi (bench).
Pride In: Bradley Stephen (centre), Mat Laumea (front row), Maurice Blair (bench).
Townsville and Districts Mendi Blackhawks 1. Nathan Traill, 2. Michael Bell, 3. Bacho Salam, 4. Kyle Laybutt, 5. Kalifa Faifai Loa, 6. Jaelen Feeney, 7. Shaun Nona (c), 8. Joe Boyce, 9. Josh Chudleigh, 10. Corey Jensen, 11. Jake Marketo, 12. Temone Power, 13. Tom Gilbert.
Interchange: 14. Krys Freeman, 15. Michael Parker-Walshe, 16. Kieran Quabba, 17. Jayden Stephens.
* = North Queensland Cowboys allocation (? players allocated for this match).
Coach: Aaron Payne.

Position	Round 17 – 2019	P	W	D	L	B	For	Against	Diff	Points
12	Northern Pride	17	4	0	13	0	254	475	-221	8

ROUND 18: Intrust Super Cup 2019

Saturday
20 July 2019
18:00 AEST (UTC+10)

Northern Pride	12 – 22	Ipswich Jets
Tries: Tom Hancock (53') 1 Cephas Chinfat (79') 1 Goals: Jordan Biondi-Odo (55') (1 from 1) 1 Brayden Torpy (79') (1 from 1) 1 Penalty Goal:	Half-time: 0 – 12; Penalties: 8 – 6 QRL Report	Tries: 1 Mitch Carpenter (23'); 1 Josh Seage (32'); 1 Rogan Dean (47'); 1 Nat Neale (71'); Goals: 3 Marmin Barba (3 from 4) Penalty Goal: 0 Marmin Barba (0 from 1)

Barlow Park
(Severin Street, Parramatta Park, QLD)
Referee: Wyatt Raymond.

Mount Peter Estate Northern Pride: 1. Cephas Chinfat – FB 2. Gideon Gela-Mosby* – WG 3. Bradley Stephen – CE 4. Enari Tuala* – CE 5. Matthew Musumeci – WG 9. Jack Campagnolo – FE 7. Brayden Torpy – HB 8. David Murphy (c) – PR 15. Tom McGrath – HK 11. Maurice Blair – PR 12. Peter Hola* – SR 13. Tom Hancock (c) – SR 17. Terrence Casey-Douglas – LK
Interchange: 6. Jordan Biondi-Odo, 14. Patrick Gallen, 16. Aidan Day, 19. Brad Lupi.
* = Cowboys allocation (3 players allocated for this match).
Pride Out: Shawn Bowen (wing), Mat Laumea (front row), Cameron Torpy (front row), Quinlyn Cannon (bench).
Pride In: Gideon Gela-Mosby* (wing), Tom McGrath (hooker), Patrick Gallen (bench), Brad Lupi (bench).
Changes: Jordan Biondi-Odo (five-eighth to bench), Jack Campagnolo (hooker to five-eighth), Terrence Casey-Douglas (second row to lock), Peter Hola* (lock to second row), David Murphy (bench to front row), Maurice Blair (bench to front row).
Ipswich Jets 1. Michael Purcell, 2. Marmin Barba, 3. Richard Pandia, 4. Isimeeli Hafoka, 5. Rogan Dean, 9. Josh Cleeland, 7. Julian Christian, 8. Blake Lenehan, 15. Kierran Moseley, 10. Nathaniel Neale (c), 19. Mitch Carpenter, 12. Ben White, 13. Ben Shea.
Interchange: 11. Josh Seage, 14. Jayden Connors, 16. Fakahoko Teutau, 17. Timote Paseka.
* = Brisbane Broncos allocation (? players allocated for this match).
Coaches: Ben Walker & Shane Walker.
- Note: This was the Pride debut for Patrick Gallen and Tom McGrath (Pride Players 166 & 167).

Position	Round 18 – 2019	P	W	D	L	B	For	Against	Diff	Points
12	Northern Pride	18	4	0	14	0	266	497	-231	8

ROUND 19: Intrust Super Cup 2019

Saturday
28 July 2019
15:10 AEST (UTC+10)

SL Magpies	24 – 20	Northern Pride
Tries: Manaia Cherrington (28') 1 Luke Burton (60') 1 Tesi Niu (67') 1 Matt Soper-Lawler (69') 1 Goals: Guy Hamilton (4 from 4) 4 Penalty Goal:	Half-time: 6 – 8 Penalties: 5 – 4 Sin bin: Tesi Niu; QRL Report	Tries: 1 Enari Tuala* (14'); 1 David Murphy (75'); 1 Gideon Gela-Mosby* (77') Goals: 3 Jordan Biondi-Odo (3 from 3); Penalty Goal: 1 Jordan Biondi-Odo (37') (1 from 1)

Davies Park
(West End, Brisbane, QLD)
Referee: Wyatt Raymond, Daniel Schwass.

Mount Peter Estate Northern Pride: 1. Cephas Chinfat – FB 2. Matthew Musumeci – WG 3. Javid Bowen* – CE 4. Enari Tuala* – CE 5. Gideon Gela-Mosby* – WG 6. Jordan Biondi-Odo – FE 7. Brayden Torpy – HB 10. David Murphy (c) – PR 9. Jack Campagnolo – HK 15. Tom McGrath – PR 12. Tom Hancock (c) – SR 17. Maurice Blair – SR 13. Peter Hola* – LK
Interchange: 8. Aidan Day, 11. Terrence Casey-Douglas, 14. Quinlyn Cannon, 16. Brad Lupi.
* = Cowboys allocation (4 players allocated for this match).
Pride Out: Bradley Stephen (centre), Patrick Gallen (bench).
Pride In: Javid Bowen* (centre), Quinlyn Cannon (bench).
Changes: Jack Campagnolo (five-eighth to hooker), Tom McGrath (hooker to front row), Maurice Blair (front row to second row), Peter Hola* (second row to lock), Terrence Casey-Douglas (lock to bench), Jordan Biondi-Odo (bench to five-eighth).
Souths Logan Magpies 1. Tesi Niu, 2. Linc Port, 3. Ilikena Vudogo, 4. Jacob Tonge, 5. Matt Soper-Lawler, 6. Guy Hamilton (c), 7. Lachlan Cooper, 8. George Fai, 18. Alex Bishop, 10. Rory Ferguson, 11. Mitchell Frei, 20. Patrick Mago, 13. Shaun Fensom.
Interchange: 9. Manaia Cherrington, 15. Luke Burton, 16. Sam Tagataese, 17. Cody Mcintosh.
* = Brisbane Broncos allocation (? players allocated for this match).
Coach: Jon Buchanan.

Position	Round 19 – 2019	P	W	D	L	B	For	Against	Diff	Points
12	Northern Pride	19	4	0	15	0	286	521	-235	8

ROUND 20: Intrust Super Cup 2019

Saturday
28 July 2019
18:00 AEST (UTC+10)

Northern Pride	14 – 62	Norths Devils
Tries: Maurice Blair (19') 1 Javid Bowen* (68') 1 Matthew Musumeci (74') 1 Goals: Jordan Biondi-Odo (69') (1 from 3) 1	Half-time: 4 – 30; Penalties: 5 – 12; Sin bin: Brad Lupi; QRL Report	Tries: 1 Sean O'Sullivan (3'); 4 Herbie Farnworth (9', 38', 42', 54'); 1 Troy Dargan (13'); 2 Brendan Frei (26', 61'); 1 Jack Ahearn (45'); 1 Jordan Riki (57'); 1 Paul Ulberg (70'); Goals: 9 Herbie Farnworth (9 from 11)

Barlow Park
(Severin Street, Parramatta Park, QLD)
Referee: Ben Watts.

Mount Peter Estate Northern Pride: 1. Cephas Chinfat – FB 2. Matthew Musumeci – WG 3. Javid Bowen* – CE 4. Enari Tuala* – CE 5. Shawn Bowen – WG 6. Jordan Biondi-Odo – FE 7. Brayden Torpy – HB 8. Aidan Day – PR 9. Jack Campagnolo – HK 10. David Murphy (c) – PR 11. Terrence Casey-Douglas – SR 12. Tom Hancock (c) – SR 13. Maurice Blair – LK
Interchange: 14. Quinlyn Cannon, 16. Brad Lupi, 18. Denzel King, 19. Bradley Stephen.
* = Cowboys allocation (2 players allocated for this match).
Pride Out: Gideon Gela-Mosby* (wing), Tom McGrath (front row), Peter Hola* (lock).
Pride In: Shawn Bowen (wing), Denzel King (bench), Bradley Stephen (bench).
Changes: Maurice Blair (second row to lock), Aidan Day (bench to front row), Terrence Casey-Douglas (bench to second row).
Norths Devils 1. Jack Ahearn (c), 2. Herbie Farnworth, 3. Henry Penn, 4. Connor Broadhurst, 5. Paul Ulberg, 6. Sean O'Sullivan, 7. Troy Dargan, 8. Oshae Tuiasau, 14. Calum Gahan, 10. Jamayne Taunoa-Brown, 11. Brendan Frei, 12. Nixon Putt, 13. Pride Petterson-Robati.
Interchange: 9. Michael Sio, 15. Ethan Bullemor, 17. Jordan Riki, 18. Brandon Lee.
* = Brisbane Broncos allocation (? players allocated for this match).
Coach: Rohan Smith.

Position	Round 20 – 2019	P	W	D	L	B	For	Against	Diff	Points
12	Northern Pride	20	4	0	16	0	300	583	-283	8

ROUND 21: Intrust Super Cup 2019

Saturday
17 August 2019
16:00 AEST (UTC+10)

Burleigh Bears	24 – 14	Northern Pride
Tries: Anthony Don (8', 19', 46') 3 Blake Leary (28') 1 Jeff Lynch (41') 1 Goals: Jamal Fogarty (2 from 5) 2	Half-time: 12 – 0 Penalties: – Sin bin: Troy Leo; QRL Report	Tries: 1 Enari Tuala* (55'); 1 Quinlyn Cannon (72'); 1 Matthew Musumeci (77'); Goals: 1 Jack Campagnolo (73') (1 from 3)

Pizzey Park
(Miami, Gold Coast, QLD)

Mount Peter Estate Northern Pride: 1. Cephas Chinfat – FB 2. Shawn Bowen – WG 3. Javid Bowen* – CE 4. Enari Tuala* – CE 5. Matthew Musumeci – WG 6. Jared Allen – FE 7. Jack Campagnolo – HB 8. Mat Laumea – PR 9. Quinlyn Cannon – HK 10. David Murphy (c) – PR 12. Tom Hancock (c) – SR 17. Terrence Casey-Douglas – SR 11. Maurice Blair – LK
Interchange: 14. Aidan Day, 15. Patrick Gallen, 16. Joe Eichner, 17. Brad Lupi.
* = Cowboys allocation (2 players allocated for this match).
Pride Out: Jordan Biondi-Odo (five-eighth), Brayden Torpy (halfback), Denzel King (bench), Bradley Stephen (bench).
Pride In: Jared Allen (five-eighth), Mat Laumea (front row), Patrick Gallen (bench), Joe Eichner (bench).
Changes: Aidan Day (front row to bench), Jack Campagnolo (hooker to halfback), Quinlyn Cannon (bench to hooker).
Burleigh Bears 1. Dylan Phythian, 2. Troy Leo, 3. Sami Sauiluma, 4. Josh Berkers, 5. Anthony Don, 6. Connor Toia, 7. Jamal Fogarty, 8. Luke Page (c), 9. Pat Politoni, 10. Jack Buchanan, 11. Hayden Schwass, 12. Blake Leary, 17. Sam Coster.
Interchange: 13. Oliver Percy, 14. Jeff Lynch, 15. Matt Robinson, 18. Tanah Boyd.
* = Gold Coast Titans allocation (? players allocated for this match).
Coach: Jim Lenihan.

Position	Round 21 – 2019	P	W	D	L	B	For	Against	Diff	Points
12	Northern Pride	21	4	0	17	0	314	607	-293	8

ROUND 22: Intrust Super Cup 2019

Saturday
24 August 2019
18:00 AEST (UTC+10)

Northern Pride	18 – 16	Brisbane Tigers
Tries: Cephas Chinfat (46') 1 Patrick Gallen (52') 1 Gideon Gela-Mosby* (58') 1 Goals: Jack Campagnolo (3 from 3) 3	Half-time: 0 – 10; Penalties: 7 – 6 QRL Report	Tries: 1 Isaac Lumelume (4'); 1 Billy Walters (34'); 1 Shane Neumann (43'); Goals: 2 Billy Walters (2 from 3)

Barlow Park
(Severin Street, Parramatta Park, QLD)
Referee: Ethan Menchin.

Mount Peter Estate Northern Pride: 1. Cephas Chinfat – FB 2. Gideon Gela-Mosby* – WG 3. Javid Bowen* – CE 4. Enari Tuala* – CE 5. Matthew Musumeci – WG 6. Jared Allen – FE 7. Jack Campagnolo – HB 8. Mat Laumea – PR 9. Quinlyn Cannon – HK 10. David Murphy (c) – PR 11. Maurice Blair – SR 12. Tom Hancock (c) – SR 17. Terrence Casey-Douglas – LK
Interchange: 13. Aidan Day, 14. Patrick Gallen, 15. Joe Eichner, 16. Brad Lupi.
* = Cowboys allocation (3 players allocated for this match).
Pride Out: Shawn Bowen (wing).
Pride In: Gideon Gela-Mosby* (wing).
Changes: Terrence Casey-Douglas (second row to lock), Maurice Blair (lock to second row).
Eastern Suburbs Tigers 1. Sam Foster, 2. Jarrod Mcinally, 3. Marion Seve, 4. Solomone Kata, 5. Isaac Lumelume, 6. Billy Walters, 7. Joshua Fauid, 8. Heath Wilson, 9. Chris Ostwald, 10. Sam Lavea, 11. Bill Cullen, 12. John Puna, 13. Brett Greinke (c).
Interchange: 14. Jack Walters, 15. Jack Svendsen, 16. Shane Neumann, 17. Tyrone Amey.
* = Melbourne Storm allocation (? players allocated for this match).
Coach: Scott Sipple.
- Note: This was the Pride debut for Joe Eichner (Pride Player 168).

Position	Round 22 – 2019	P	W	D	L	B	For	Against	Diff	Points
12	Northern Pride	22	5	0	17	0	332	623	-291	10

ROUND 23: Intrust Super Cup 2019

Saturday
31 August 2019
16:00 AEST (UTC+10)

Tweed Heads Seagulls	12 – 10	Northern Pride
Tries: Lamar Liolevave (13') 1 Treymain Spry (18') 1 Goals: Lindon McGrady (14') (1 from 2) 1 Penalty Goal: Lindon McGrady (65') (1 from 1) 1	Half-time: 10 – 4 Penalties: 4 – 3 QRL Report	Tries: 2 Gideon Gela-Mosby* (22', 58') Goals: 1 Jack Campagnolo (59') (1 from 2); Penalty Goal:

Piggabeen Sports Complex
(Caramar Drive, Tweed Heads West, NSW)
Referee: Tim Rutherford.

Mount Peter Estate Northern Pride: 1. Cephas Chinfat – FB 2. Gideon Gela-Mosby* – WG 3. Javid Bowen* – CE 4. Enari Tuala* – CE 5. Matthew Musumeci – WG 6. Jared Allen – FE 7. Jack Campagnolo – HB 8. Mat Laumea – PR 14. Patrick Gallen – HK 10. David Murphy (c) – PR 12. Maurice Blair – SR 16. Aidan Day – SR 13. Terrence Casey-Douglas – LK
Interchange: 9. Jordan Biondi-Odo, 15. Joe Eichner, 17. Brad Lupi, 19. Bradley Stephen.
* = Cowboys allocation (3 players allocated for this match).
Pride Out: Quinlyn Cannon (hooker), Tom Hancock (second row).
Pride In: Jordan Biondi-Odo (bench), Bradley Stephen (bench).
Changes: Aidan Day (bench to second row), Patrick Gallen (bench to hooker).
Tweed Heads Seagulls 1. Lindon Mcgrady, 2. Lee Turner, 3. Kody Parsons, 4. Treymain Spry, 5. Talor Walters, 6. Luke Jurd, 7. Brent Woolf, 15. Will Matthews, 9. Christian Hazard, 10. John Palavi (c), 11. Lamar Liolevave, 12. Ioane Seiuli, 13. Rory Lillis.
Interchange: 8. Jarrod Morfett, 16. Stuart Mason, 18. Kirk Murphy, 21. Liam Hampson.
* = Gold Coast Titans allocation (? players allocated for this match).
Coach: Ben Woolf.

Position	Round 23 – 2019	P	W	D	L	B	For	Against	Diff	Points
12	Northern Pride	23	5	0	18	0	342	635	-293	10

== 2019 ladder ==
2019 Queensland Cup
Pos	Team	Pld	W	D	L	PF	PA	PD	Pts
1	Sunshine Coast Falcons	23	21	1	1	856	292	+564	43
2	Wynnum Manly Seagulls	23	18	0	5	652	362	+290	36
3	Burleigh Bears (P)	23	17	0	6	663	304	+359	34
4	Townsville Blackhawks	23	17	0	6	566	344	+222	34
5	Norths Devils	23	15	0	8	619	477	+142	30
6	Tweed Heads Seagulls	23	14	0	9	464	438	+26	28
7	Redcliffe Dolphins	23	13	0	10	558	392	+166	26
8	Easts Tigers	23	10	1	12	478	541	-63	21
9	Ipswich Jets	23	9	1	13	466	563	-97	19
10	Souths Logan Magpies	23	7	1	15	465	694	-229	15
11	Mackay Cutters	23	7	0	16	416	566	-150	14
12	Northern Pride	23	5	0	18	342	635	-293	10
13	Papua New Guinea Hunters	23	4	1	18	315	750	-435	9
14	Central Queensland Capras	23	1	1	21	318	820	-502	3

=== Northern Pride (regular season 2019) ===
- Win = 5 (4 of 11 home games, 1 of 12 away games)
- Loss = 18 (7 of 11 home games, 11 of 12 away games)

Round	1	2	3	4	5	6	7	8	9	10	11	12	13	14	15	16	17	18	19	20	21	22	23
Result	W	W	L	L	L	L	L	L	L	L	L	L	W	L	W	L	L	L	L	L	L	W	L
Ground	H	A	H	A	A	H	H	A	A	H	H	A	H	A	H	H	A	A	A	H	A	H	A

Source: https://web.archive.org/web/20120916041305/http://www.qrl.com.au/
A = Away; H = Home; B = Bye; W = Win; D = Draw; L = Loss; P = Postpone

== 2019 Northern Pride players ==
Pride player	Appearances	Tries	Goals	Field goals	Pts
Aiden Day	22	1	0	0	4
Brad Lupi	7	0	0	0	0
Bradley Stephen	9	2	0	0	8
Brayden Torpy	17	0	15	0	30
Cameron Torpy	10	1	0	0	4
Cephas Chinfat	9	3	0	0	12
Connor Jones	15	4	0	0	16
David Murphy	18	2	0	0	8
Denzel King	6	0	0	0	0
Dominic Biondi	3	1	0	0	4
Evan Child	1	0	0	0	0
Ewan Moore	6	2	0	0	8
Hugh Sedger	8	0	0	0	0
Jack Campagnolo	16	1	5	0	14
Jack Murphy	10	2	0	0	8
Jared Allen	5	0	0	0	0
Joe Eichner	3	0	0	0	0
Jordan Biondi-Odo	19	2	18	0	44
Mat Laumea	19	0	0	0	0
Matthew Musumeci	22	7	0	0	28
Maurice Blair	15	1	0	0	4
Patrick Gallen	4	1	0	0	4
Quinlyn Cannon	7	2	0	0	8
Shawn Bowen	19	4	0	0	16
Steven Tatipata	2	2	0	0	8
Terrence Casey-Douglas	14	0	0	0	0
Tom Hancock	21	4	0	0	16
Tom McGrath	2	0	0	0	0
Will Bugden	15	1	0	0	4

=== North Queensland Cowboys who played for the Pride in 2019 ===
Cowboys player	Appearances	Tries	Goals	Field goals	Pts
Ben Hampton*	1	0	0	0	0
Enari Tuala*	15	5	0	0	20
Gideon Gela-Mosby*	10	5	0	0	20
Jake Clifford*	6	1	9	0	22
Javid Bowen*	14	3	0	0	12
Kurt Baptiste*	2	0	0	0	0
Nene Macdonald*	1	1	0	0	4
Peter Hola*	18	4	0	0	16
