= Maurice Blair =

Australian rugby league footballer (born 1984)

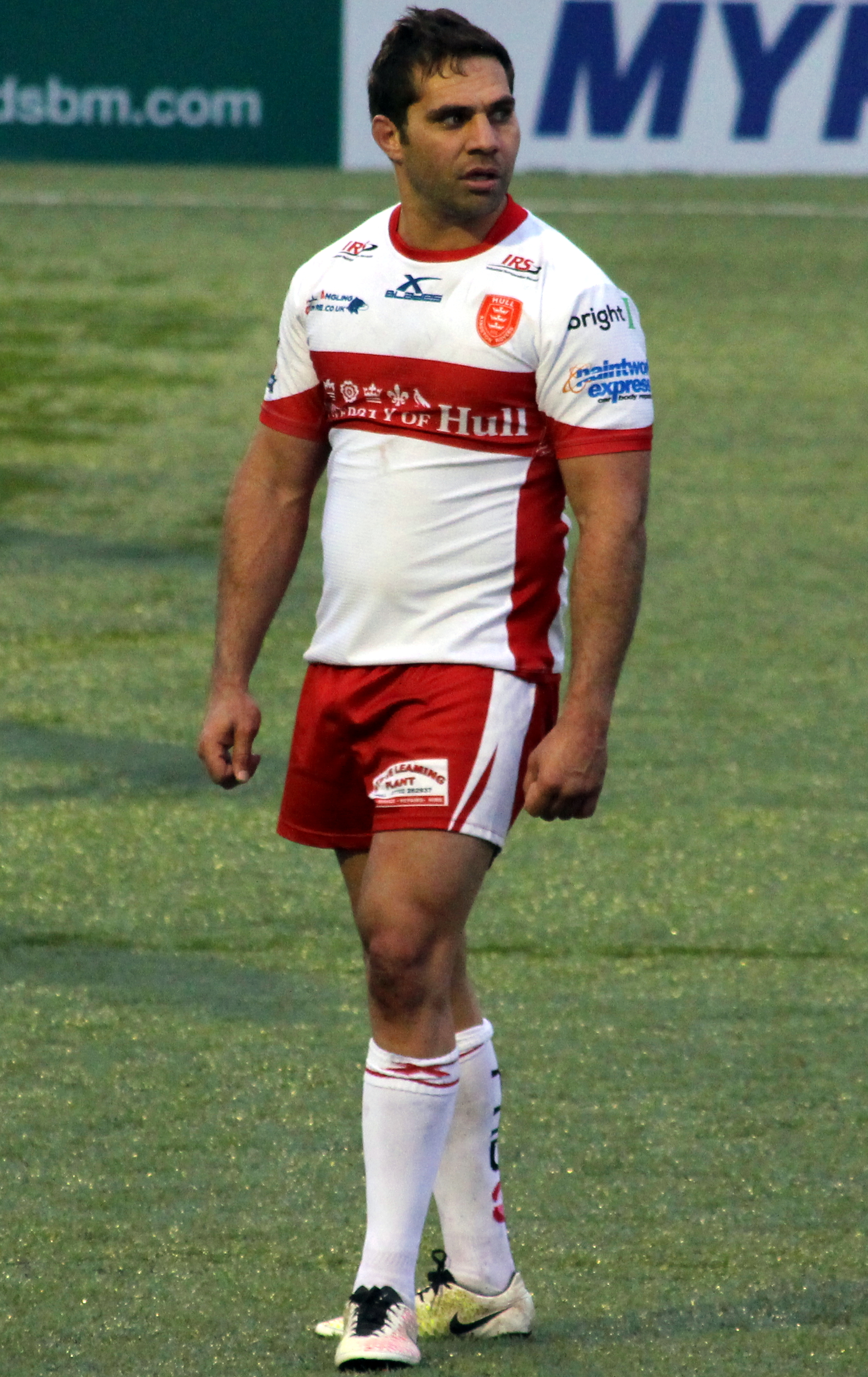

Personal information
- Full name: Maurice Blair
- Born: 16 October 1984 (age 42) Maryborough, Queensland, Australia
- Height: 185 cm (6 ft 1 in)
- Weight: 98 kg (15 st 6 lb)

Playing information
- Position: Five-eighth, Centre, Second-row
Club
Years	Team	Pld	T	G	FG	P
2007–10	Penrith Panthers	48	10	0	0	40
2011–13	Melbourne Storm	36	13	1	0	54
2014	Gold Coast Titans	15	1	0	0	0
2015–18	Hull Kingston Rovers	117	21	1	0	86
	Total	216	45	2	0	180
Representative
Years	Team	Pld	T	G	FG	P
2005	Queensland Residents	1	0	0	0	0
2008	Indigenous All Stars	1	0	0	0	0
- Source: As of 4 January 2024

Maurice "Bobby" Blair (born 16 October 1984) is an Indigenous Australian professional rugby league footballer who plays in the second-row for the Northern Pride in the QRL State competition. He has previously played for Hull Kingston Rovers in the Super League, Blair has also played for the Gold Coast Titans, Melbourne Storm and the Penrith Panthers in the National Rugby League.

== Background ==
Blair was born in Maryborough, Queensland, Australia. Blair played his junior football with the Maryborough Rovers, before signing with the Souths Logan Magpies.

== Club career ==
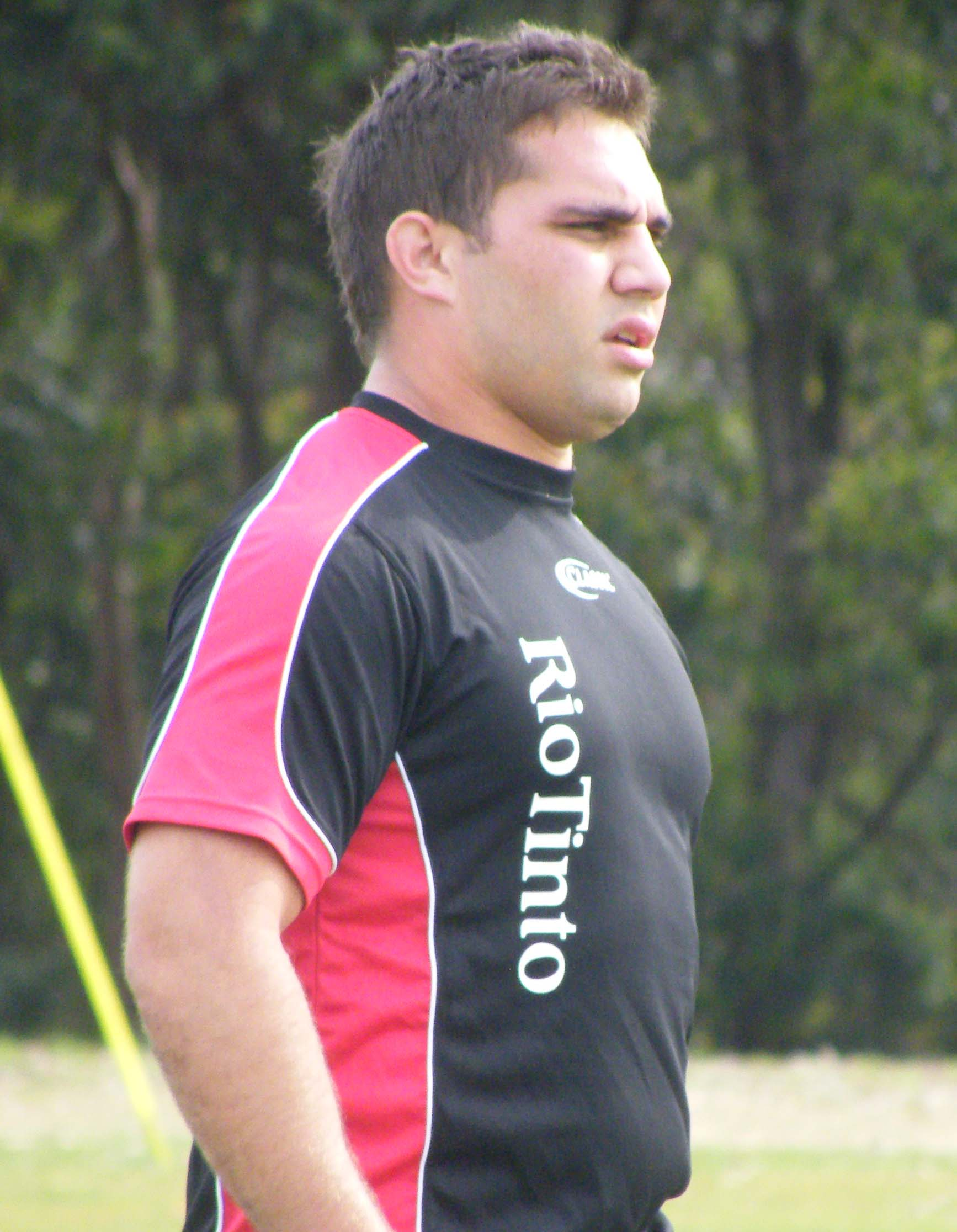
Blair training with the Indigenous All Stars in 2008

=== Penrith Panthers (2007–10) ===
He made his début in round 15 of the 2007 NRL season, playing for the Penrith Panthers against the New Zealand Warriors. He made a total of nine appearances for Penrith and scored six tries for the club in his debut year as they finished last on the table and claimed the wooden spoon.

=== Melbourne Storm (2011–13) ===
Blair signed for the Melbourne Storm for the 2011 NRL season.

He made his début for the Storm against the Brisbane Broncos later in the same season. In his first two years at the club, Blair played sporadically for the first grade team but in the 2014 NRL season he played in Melbourne's finals campaign. He scored a try for Melbourne in their elimination final against the Newcastle Knights.

=== Gold Coast Titans (2014) ===
Blair spent the 2014 NRL season at the Gold Coast Titans as they finished 14th on the table.

=== Hull Kingston Rovers (2015–18) ===
On 18 October 2014, Blair was released from the Gold Coast Titans, to sign a two-year contract with Super League club Hull Kingston Rovers, making his début on 8 February 2015, and going on to represent the club in the 2015 Challenge Cup Final which they lost 0–50.

Blair was named Hull Kingston Rovers' 'Player of the Year' in the 2016 season but he suffered relegation from the Super League with them, after losing the Million Pound Game to the Salford Red Devils.

Twelve months later Blair was part of the side that won promotion back to the Super League at the first time of asking. During the 2018 season he surpassed the 100th-game milestone for Hull Kingston Rovers, and on 30 September 2018 played his last game with them in the Qualifiers in a 30–0 victory over the Widnes Vikings, picking up the 'Man of the Match Award' for his efforts in his farewell appearance.

=== Northern Pride (2019) ===
It was revealed on 13 February 2019, that Blair had signed a contract to play for the Northern Pride in the QRL State competition, the Queensland Cup. Blair retired at the end of the 2019 season.

== Representative career ==
Blair was honoured in 2008, the Centenary Season of rugby league, playing at centre for the Indigenous All Stars who subsequently defeated the New Zealand Māori 34–26, at the 2008 Rugby League World Cup Opening Ceremony.

== Personal life ==
Blair has had a relationship with Courtney Tairi, a former New Zealand netball international.

== Honours ==
=== Club (Hull Kingston Rovers 2015–18) ===
- 2016: Roger Millward – 'Player of the Year Award'
- 2018: Colin Hutton – 'Special Recognition Awards'
- 2018: Colin Hutton – 'Outstanding Contribution Award' (100th appearance)
