= Peter Hola =

Australian rugby league footballer

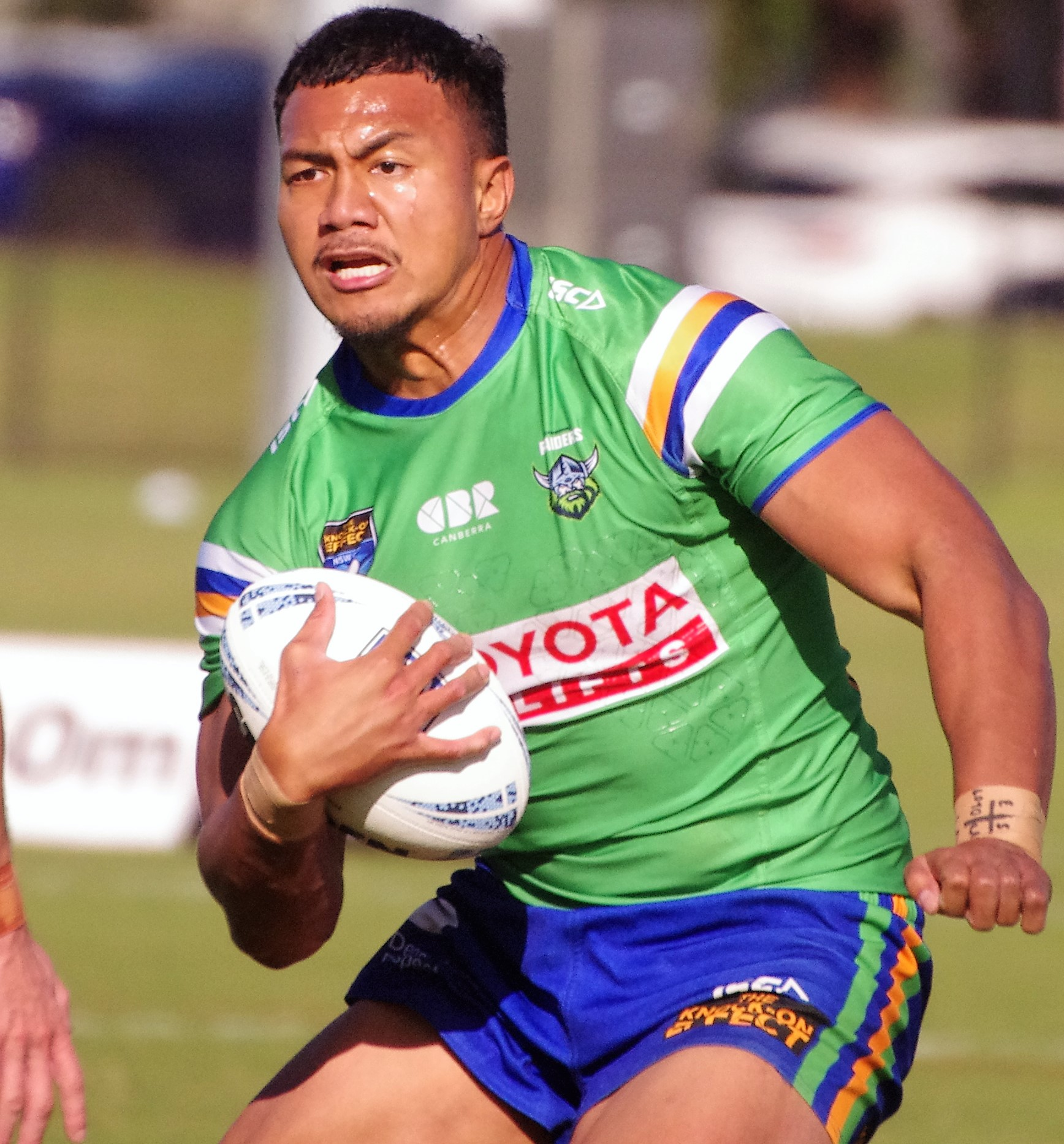

Personal information
- Born: 27 April 1999 (age 27) Sydney, New South Wales, Australia
- Height: 192 cm (6 ft 4 in)
- Weight: 109 kg (17 st 2 lb)

Playing information
- Position: Prop, Lock
Club
Years	Team	Pld	T	G	FG	P
2019–21	North Qld Cowboys	12	0	0	0	0
2023–24	Canberra Raiders	3	0	0	0	0
2025	Dolphins	2	0	0	0	0
2026–	Newcastle Knights	1	0	0	0	0
	Total	18	0	0	0	0
- Source: As of 19 April 2026

Peter Hola (born 27 April 1999) is a professional rugby league footballer who plays as a prop for the Newcastle Knights in the National Rugby League (NRL) and the Norths Devils in the Queensland Cup.

Hola previously played for the Dolphins, the Canberra Raiders and the North Queensland Cowboys in the NRL, and he is under contract for two years with the Newcastle Knights from 2026.

== Background ==
Hola was born in Sydney, New South Wales, Australia. He is of Tongan descent, and was raised in Auckland, New Zealand.

He played his junior rugby league for the Marist Saints. He attended Avondale College and was signed by the North Queensland Cowboys after being spotted at the 2016 New Zealand Schoolboys carnival.

== Playing career ==
=== Early career ===
In 2017, Hola moved to Townsville, Queensland, where he joined the Cowboys NYC squad. He began the season playing for the Townsville Blackhawks Mal Meninga Cup side before moving up to the Cowboys NYC side and playing eight games. In September 2017, he represented the New Zealand under-18 side in their loss to the Australian Schoolboys.

In 2018, Hola played for the Northern Pride in the Hastings Deering Colts competition, winning their under-20 Best and Fairest award, and made his Queensland Cup debut for them later that season. On 13 October, he played for the Junior Kiwis in their loss to the Junior Kangaroos at Mt Smart Stadium.

=== 2019 ===
On 19 February, Hola re-signed with the North Queensland club until the 2022 season and joined their NRL squad. He began the season playing for the Northern Pride in the Queensland Cup.

In Round 21 of the 2019 NRL season, Hola made his NRL debut in an 14–18 loss to the Brisbane Broncos. He ended his rookie season with five appearances for the North Queensland side.

=== 2020 ===
In February, Hola was a member of the North Queensland's 2020 NRL Nines winning squad. Hola's playing time was limited in 2020 due to injuries. In Round 9, after four appearances for North Queensland, he dislocated his wrist in a 16–42 loss to the Sydney Roosters, which kept him out for the rest of the season.

=== 2021 ===
Hola signed a deal to join the Canberra Raiders on a two-year deal starting with the 2022 season.

=== 2024 ===
In October, after two seasons with the Raiders, Hola signed with the Norths Devils in the Queensland Cup.

=== 2025 ===
On 16 July, it was announced that Hola had signed a two-year deal to join the Newcastle Knights in 2026. The following day (round 20), he played off the bench for the Dolphins against the North Queensland Cowboys at Suncorp Stadium.

== Achievements and accolades ==
=== Team ===
- 2020 NRL Nines: North Queensland Cowboys – Winners

== Statistics ==
=== NRL ===
Statistics as of NRL round 20 2025

Season	Team	Matches	T	G	GK %	F/G	Pts
2019	North Queensland	5	0	0	—	0	0
2020	North Queensland	4	0	0	—	0	0
2021	North Queensland	3	0	0	—	0	0
2023	Canberra	2	0	0	—	0	0
2024	Canberra	1	0	0	—	0	0
2025	Dolphins	2					
2026	Newcastle Knights						
	Totals	17					
