= 2011 Northern Pride RLFC season =

Northern Pride
Club information
- Full name: Northern Pride Rugby League Football Club
- Nickname: The Pride
- Colours: Teal, Gold
- Founded: 2007
- Website: northernpride.com.au

Current details
- Ground: Barlow Park, Cairns (seating 1,700, standing 15,000)
- CEO: Chris Sheppard (2011-2013)
- Coach: David Maiden (2010-2012)
- Captain: Ty Williams (2011-2013)
- Competition: Intrust Super Cup
- 2011: 2nd
Home colours

Away colours

Records
- Premierships: 2 (2010, 2014)
- Runners-up: 1 (2009)
- Minor premierships: 3 (2013, 2014, 2024)

2011 was the fourth competitive season for the Cairns based Skill360 Northern Pride Rugby League Football Club. They were one of 12 Australian clubs that played in the sixteenth season of Queensland's top rugby league competition, QRL's Intrust Super Cup, with each team playing 11 home games and 11 away games over 25 weeks between March and September.

Pride Oval and Leagues Club on Irene Street, Mooroobool were costing the club about $19,000 a month to run, an unsustainable drain on their funds. Plans to build a sports facility were delayed due to the 2008 financial crisis and at the end of 2010, the club sold the facility to Cairns Regional Council for $2.5 million. Council agreed to maintain the facility as a sports field for the community and not allow residential development at the site. The Pride were given a six-month lease, and when it expired in May 2011, the club decided not to renew and moved their training sessions back to Jones Park, Westcourt. Pride Oval was leased to CDRL Kangaroos, and became Vico Oval and Kangaroos Leagues Club once again. The Pride's continued to play home games at Barlow Park and the administration offices were at Mann Street.

Foundation captain Chris Sheppard retired after the Grand Final win last year, and was appointed as CEO, replacing John Moore. The new captain was Ty Williams, who began playing rugby league in Innisfail, played for the Cairns Cyclones in QCup, played 151 games for the NRL's North Queensland Cowboys (2002–2010) as a wing, centre and five-eighth, scoring 85 tries, the third-most in club history. He represented Queensland in State of Origin and played for the Indigenous All Stars (2008, 2010). As one of the Cowboy's player allocation, Williams had made 25 appearances for the Pride between 2008 and 2010, scoring 12 tries, before retiring from the Cowboys at the end of 2010.

The Pride gained a mascot for home games, 'Rambo the Razorback'. The Round 20 away game against Souths Logan Magpies was relocated from the Magpies home ground in Brisbane to Yusia Ginau Oval, Bamaga on Cape York in an effort to raise money for the Magpies who were struggling to attract crowds at their home venue. Both teams wore special Indigenous themed jerseys and the game attracted 2000 spectators, and was so successful that the following year, QRL introduced the 'Country Week' concept.

The Pride started the year strong, winning the first five rounds. This meant the Pride had not lost a game since Round 13 last year - 17 consecutive wins, a Queensland Cup record, previously held by the Burleigh Bears and North Queensland Young Guns with 16 consecutive wins. Their Round 5 win, 60–10 over the SC Sea Eagles was the biggest winning score in the Pride's history and the first time they had beaten the Sunny Coast. The victory set several club records, including the biggest winning margin in the club's history, the most tries by the Pride in a single game, and the most goals in a single Pride game (Chey Bird, 10). After a draw in Round 6 and a win in Round 7, they were unbeaten after 19 matches. In Round 8 the Pride led the Cutters 12–0 at half-time, but were beater 22–18, their first defeat in eleven months.

The Pride finished the 2011 season in second place, and had a decisive victory in their home Preliminary Final against the Ipswich Jets, but were eliminated after losing the semi-final 26–20 to Tweed Heads Seagulls. Although the Pride were entitled to host the semi-final, the match was scheduled to be televised, and ABC TV still did not have the ability for outside broadcast from FNQ, so the match was played at Dolphin Oval, Redcliffe. This was the second time a Pride home finals game had been moved to Brisbane to accommodate the ABC's lack of flexibility, (the other time was in 2009), and the Pride lost substantial amount of game-day revenue playing in front of a small crowd at a neutral venue.

== 2011 Season – Skill360 Northern Pride ==
- Competition: Intrust Super Cup
- Sponsor: Skill360

=== Staff ===
==== Coaches/trainers ====
- Coach: David Maiden.
- Assistant coach: David Westley
- Mal Meninga Cup U-18s coach: Leon Hallie
- Cyril Connell Cup U-16s coach: Cameron 'Spilla' Miller
- Strength and conditioning coach: Scott Callaghan

==== Captains ====
- Ty Williams
- Ben Laity (Pre-season Trial)
- Chey Bird (Pre-season Trial, Rounds 10-17 & 20)

==== Managers ====
- Team manager: Rob White
- Office Manager: Sheron McDougall
- Club captain: Ben Laity
- Business development manager: Brock Schaefer
- Chief executive: Chris Sheppard
- Chairman: Bob Fowler
- Board of Directors: Nigel Tillett, Craig Meiklejohn, Anthony Mirotsos, Bob Fowler.

== 2011 squad ==
The Pride used 34 players this season. Sixteen players from last year signed with the club again, and two of the Cowboys allocation players from last year were assigned to the Pride again this year. Fifteen new players made their debut this season; eight were new signings (Aidan Day, Davin Crampton, Lancen Joudo, Luke Saunders, Mick Wilson, Ryan Ghietti, Shaun Nona and Sheldon Powe-Hobbs), and seven were new Cowboys allocation players (Blake Leary*, Cory Paterson*, Jack Cooper*, James Segeyaro*, Kalifa Faifai Loa*, Ricky Thorby* and Will Tupou*). Ty Williams, who had played 25 games for the Pride as a Cowboys allocated player between 2008 and 2010, retired from the NRL and signed to the Pride. Joel Riethmuller* signed to the Cowboys and was allocated to the Pride.

Ty Williams (c)
Aidan Day
Alex Starmer
Ben Fitzpatrick
Ben Laity
Ben Spina
Brenton Bowen
Brett Anderson
Chey Bird
Davin Crampton
Hezron Murgha
Jason Roos

Lancen Joudo
Luke Harlen
Luke Saunders
Mark Cantoni
Mark Dalle Cort
Mick Wilson
Noel Underwood
Rod Jensen
Ryan Ghietti
Shaun Nona
Sheldon Powe-Hobbs

Trial

Aisea Namoa
Francis Mosby
Nathan Kepa
Theeran Pearson
Tom Hancock

North Queensland Cowboys allocation

Blake Leary*
Cory Paterson*
James Segeyaro*
Jack Cooper*
Joel Riethmuller*
Kalifa Faifai Loa*
Michael Bani*
Ricky Thorby*
Scott Bolton*

Rounds 1-6: Pride; Rounds 7-22: Mackay Cutters:
Clint Amos*
Will Tupou*

Allocated but did not play for the Pride in 2011:
Carl Webb*

=== 2011 player gains ===
Player	From League	From Club	Notes
Ty Williams	NRL Telstra Premiership	North Queensland Cowboys	
Aidan Day	NRL U-20s	North Queensland Cowboys	
Luke Harlen	NRL Telstra Premiership	Cronulla Sharks	
Lancen Joudo	NRL Telstra Premiership	Cronulla Sharks	
Ryan Ghietti	Intrust Super Cup	Redcliffe Dolphins	
Mick Wilson	Intrust Super Cup	Redcliffe Dolphins	
Shaun Nona	CDRL	Tully Tigers	
Sheldon Powe-Hobbs	CDRL	Kangaroos (Cairns) RLFC	
Francis Mosby	CDRL	Kangaroos (Cairns) RLFC	
Luke Saunders	CDRL	Southern Suburbs	
Davin Crampton	Mid West RL	Normanton Stingers	
Hezron Murgha	Return from injury	Northern Pride	
Nathaniel Bowman	QRL	Townsville Blackhawks	Bowman signed for the Pride, but did not turn up for training. He reneged on the deal, signing with CQ Comets instead.

=== Player losses after 2010 season ===
Player	To League	To Club
Chris Sheppard	Retired	Pride's Captain 2008–2010
Ryan Stig	NRL Telstra Premiership	Newcastle Knights
Jaiman Lowe	NRL Telstra Premiership	South Sydney Rabbitohs
Joel Riethmuller	NRL Telstra Premiership	North Queensland Cowboys
Rod Griffin	Intrust Super Cup	Tweed Heads Seagulls
Jamie Frizzo	Retired	to coach CDRL Ivanhoes Knights
Chris Riesen	CDRL	Brothers Cairns
Drew Campbell	CDRL	Brothers Cairns
Sonny Rea	Rugby Samoa	Samoa national rugby union team
Kane Manihera		
Quincy To'oto'o-ulugia		

==== Cowboys no longer allocated to the Pride ====
Player	To League	To Club
Carl Webb*	NRL Telstra Premiership	Parramatta Eels
Manase Manuokafoa*	NRL Telstra Premiership	Parramatta Eels
John Williams*	NRL Telstra Premiership	Cronulla Sharks
Nick Slyney*	NRL Telstra Premiership	Brisbane Broncos
James Tamou*	NRL Telstra Premiership	North Queensland Cowboys

=== 2011 season launch ===
- Pre-Season Training: 23 November 2010.
- Pre-Season Boot Camp: Djarragun Farm in the Goldsborough Valley, 18–19 December 2010. 110 players and coaching staff from all three squads (First Grade, Under-18 and Under-16) attended the boot camp.
- Corporate launch: 14 March 14, 2011, Cairns Colonial Club, Manoora.
- Season launch: 12 March 2011, Esplanade Lagoon, Cairns.

=== 2011 player awards ===
Friday 30 September 2011, All Seasons Colonial Club, Manunda

- Northern Pride Player of the Year: Jason Roos
- Inaugural Calanna Pharmacy Member's Player of the Year: Chey Bird
- Players' Player: Joel Riethmuller
- Best back player: Brett Anderson
- Best forward player: Luke Harlen
- Most improved player: Ben Spina
- John O'Brien Perpetual Club Person of the Year: Chey Bird
- Australia Day Awards, 25 January 2011: Senior Sports Person Award: Chris Sheppard.

==== 2011 player records ====
(Records to end of the 2011 season)
- Most Games – Ben Laity 96, Mark Cantoni 89, Chey Bird 85, Jason Roos 81, Joel Riethmuller* 67.
- Most Points – Chey Bird 542, Tom Humble 174, Rod Jensen 136, Ryan Stig 128, Brett Anderson 116.
- Most Tries – Rod Jensen 34, Brett Anderson 29, Mark Cantoni 25, Chey Bird 22, Tom Humble 20.
- Brett Anderson scored 15 tries this season – the highest try scorer for the Pride and the third highest in the Intrust Super Cup this season.
- Chey Bird scored 198 points this season – 4 tries and 91 goals. He was the second highest point scorer in the Intrust Super Cup this season.

==== 2011 representative players ====
(United States) Mark Cantoni (2011 World Cup Qualifier), 2 appearances.

==== Players selected for the 2011 Queensland Residents team ====
Brett Anderson
Hezron Murgha.

==== Players signed to first-tier teams ====
Player	To League	To Club
Luke Harlen	NRL Telstra Premiership	North Queensland Cowboys
Sheldon Powe-Hobbs	NRL Telstra Premiership	Melbourne Storm
Mark Cantoni	French RLF Elite One Championship	Baroudeurs de Pia XIII (Pia Donkeys)

=== 2011 Jerseys ===
2011 Home

2011 Away

2011 NAIDOC Week (Round 12, Cairns)

2011 NPA Region
(Round 20, Bamaga)

==== Special playing strips ====
- 2011: NAIDOC Week green jersey worn in Round 15, Friday 8 July 2010 at Barlow Park for the game against the Burleigh Bears.
- 2011: Special NPA Region indigenous jersey designed by Mario Assan for the Round 20 game, Saturday 20 August 2011 at Yusia Ginau Oval, Bamaga against Souths Logan Magpies. The design incorporates:

- The five communities of the NPA Region: Injinoo, Umagico, Bamaga, New Mapoon and Seisia, the communities are represented on the five dots on the boomerang.
- The five tribes the traditional owners of the NPA Region (Anggamuthi, Atambaya, Wuthati, Yadhaykenu and Gudang). The tribes are depicted through the five rivers that stream from the bottom of the boomerang.
- The main centrepiece of the design the Torres Strait Headress (Dhari) traditionally known as a Dhibal, is from Saibai Island, which makes up the majority of the TSI population in the NPA which migrated to the NPA throughout the 1940s. The Dhari as a significant importance in TSI culture, the initiation of young men into warriors, celebrated through dance and ceremonies.
- The boomerang represents the Aboriginal peoples of the NPA, used in hunting and gathering and significant ceremonies

=== Trial Matches ===
Pre-season Trial 1
Saturday
19 February 2011
19:00 AEST (UTC+10)

Northern Pride	40 – 8	Innisfail Leprechauns
Tries: ? Goals: ?	Match Report	Tries: ? Goals: ?

Billy Slater Oval
(Callendar Park, Innisfail, QLD)

Skill360 Northern Pride: 1. Ben Fitzpatrick – FB , 2. Hezron Murgha – WG , 3. Ty Williams (c) – CE , 4. Davin Crampton – CE , 5. Brenton Bowen – WG , 6. Ryan Ghietti – FE , 7. Shaun Nona – HB , 8. Alex Starmer – PR , 9. Lancen Joudo – HK , 10. Aisea Namoa – PR , 11. Noel Underwood – SR , 12. Luke Saunders – SR , 13. Ben Spina – LK
Unlimited Interchange: 14. Jason Roos , 15. Brett Anderson , 16. Rod Jensen , 17. Mark Dalle Cort , 18. Sheldon Powe-Hobbs , 19. Francis Mosby , 20. Aidan Day .
Trackson Innisfail Leprechauns: ?

Pre-season Trial 2
Saturday
26 February 2011
17:30 AEST (UTC+10)

Northern Pride	4 – 24	NYC NQ Cowboys U-20s
Tries: Ty Williams 1 Goals: 0	Match Report	Tries: 2 Alex Elisala; 1 Zac Santo; 1 Nathan Norford; Goals: 4 Kyle Feldt (4 from 4)

Barlow Park
(Severin Street, Parramatta Park, QLD)

Skill360 Northern Pride: 1. Chey Bird – FB 2. Hezron Murgha – WG 3. Brett Anderson – CE 4. Ty Williams – CE 5. Kalifa Faifai Loa* – WG 6. Ryan Ghietti – FE 7. Shaun Nona – HB 8. Alex Starmer – PR 9. Jason Roos – HK 10. Ben Laity – PR 11. Ben Spina – SR 12. Mark Cantoni – SR 13. Joel Riethmuller* – LK
Unlimited Interchange: 14. Lancen Joudo, 15. Luke Saunders, 16. Clint Amos*, 17. Noel Underwood, 18. Blake Leary*, 19. Francis Mosby, 20. Luke Harlen, 21. Aidan Day, 22. James Segeyaro*.
* = Cowboys allocation.
Unavailable: Rod Jensen (ribs).
NYC U-20s Cowboys: ?
- Note: This match was the opening game for the NRL trial between the North Queensland Cowboys and Gold Coast Titans, which was due to be played at the new Stadium Mackay, but was moved to Cairns when wet weather delayed the laying of the Mackay playing surface.

Pre-season Trial 3a
Saturday
5 March 2011
17:15 AEST (UTC+10)

Northern Pride	42 – 14	TDRL Centrals ASA Tigers
Tries: ? Goals: ?		Tries: ? Goals: ?

Rugby Park
(Ayr, QLD)

Skill360 Northern Pride: 1. Ben Fitzpatrick – FB 2. Hezron Murgha – WG 3. Brett Anderson – CE 4. Davin Crampton – CE 5. Nathan Kepa – WG 6. Ryan Ghietti – FE 7. Shaun Nona – HB 8. Aidan Day – PR 9. Jason Roos – HK 10. Ben Laity (c) – PR 11. Luke Harlen – SR 12. Tom Hancock – SR 13. Ben Spina – LK
Interchange: 14. James Segeyaro*, 15. Clint Amos*, 16. Noel Underwood, 17. Mark Dalle Cort.
Unavailable: Joel Riethmuller* (signed to North Queensland Cowboys), Rod Jensen (ribs).
Aitkenvale Sporting Association Centrals Tigers: ?
- Note: The Pride had hoped to play this trial in PNG against the PNG Kumuls.

Pre-season Trial 3b
Saturday
5 March 2011
19:00 AEST (UTC+10)

Northern Pride	62 – 16	TDRL Burdekin Roosters
Tries: ? Goals: ?		Tries: ? Goals: ?

Rugby Park
(Ayr, QLD)

Skill360 Northern Pride: 1. Chey Bird (c) – FB 2. Francis Mosby – WG 3. Mark Dalle Cort – CE 4. Ty Williams (c) – CE 5. Brenton Bowen – WG 6. Clint Amos* – FE 7. Theeran Pearson – HB 8. Alex Starmer – PR 9. Lancen Joudo – HK 10. Noel Underwood – PR 11. Jack Cooper* – SR 12. Luke Saunders – SR 13. Sheldon Powe-Hobbs – LK
Unlimited Interchange: 14. James Segeyaro*, 15. Tom Hancock, 16. Davin Crampton, 17. Aidan Day, 18. Ben Spina, 19. Nathan Kepa.
* = Cowboys allocation.
Unavailable: Joel Riethmuller* (signed to the Cowboys), Rod Jensen (ribs).
Burdekin Roosters: ?

=== Intrust Super Cup matches ===
ROUND 1: Hostplus Cup 2011

Saturday 19
March 2011
18:00 AEST (UTC+10)

Central Comets	10 – 36	Northern Pride
Tries: Tyron Haynes 1 Darren Mapp 1 Goals: Nat Bowman 1	Half-time:12 – 0 Cairns Post Report; Video Highlights	Tries: 2 James Segeyaro*; 1 Chey Bird; 1 Kalifa Faifai Loa*; 1 Joel Riethmuller*; 1 Blake Leary*; Goals: 6 Chey Bird

Browne Park
(Wandal, Rockhampton, QLD)

Skill360 Northern Pride: 1. Chey Bird – FB 2. Hezron Murgha – WG 3. Brett Anderson – CE 4. Ty Williams (c) – CE 5. Kalifa Faifai Loa* – WG 6. Clint Amos* – FE 7. Ryan Ghietti – HB 8. Luke Harlen – PR 9. Jason Roos – HK 10. Ben Laity – PR 11. Blake Leary* – SR 12. Mark Cantoni – SR 13. Joel Riethmuller* – LK
Interchange: 14. James Segeyaro*, 15. Noel Underwood, 16. Jack Cooper*, 17. Alex Starmer.
* = Cowboys allocation.
Unavailable: Rod Jensen (ribs), Mick Wilson (groin), Sheldon Powe-Hobbs (broken nose).
Central Comets: 1. Nat Bowman, 2. Clint Rothery, 3. Luke Dyer, 4. Tyron Haynes, 5. Dallas Williams, 6. Ian Webster (c), 7. Jonathon Tavinor, 8. John Clayton, 9. Guy Ford, 10. Tim Glasby, 11. Marc Applegarth, 12. Darren Mapp, 13. Guy Williams.
Interchange: 14. Tevita Latu, 15. Daniel Palavi, 16. James Crombie, 17. Nick Kenny.
Coach: Wayne Barnett.
- Note: Following the retirement of halfback and captain Chris Sheppard at the end of last season, Ty Williams captained the team, and Ryan Ghietti was halfback.
  This was the Pride debut for Ryan Ghietti and North Queensland Cowboys allocation players Kalifa Faifai Loa*, Blake Leary*, James Segeyaro*, and Jack Cooper* (Pride Players 060, & 063–066).

Position	Round 1 – 2011	P	W	D	L	For	Against	Diff	Pts
1	Northern Pride	1	1	0	0	36	10	+26	2

ROUND 2: Hostplus Cup 2011

Saturday
26 March 2011
17:30 AEST (UTC+10)

Northern Pride	29 – 6	Wynnum Manly Seagulls
Tries: Hezron Murgha 1 Joel Riethmuller* 1 Mark Cantoni 1 Blake Leary* 1 Luke Harlen 1 Goals: Chey Bird 4 Field goals: Clint Amos* 1	Cairns Post Report; Video Highlights	Tries: 1 Shea Moylan Goals: 1 Matt Seamark; Field goals: 0

Barlow Park
(Severin Street, Parramatta Park, QLD)
Player of the Match:
Kennedy's Retravision Man of the Match:
Blake Leary*

Skill360 Northern Pride: 1. Chey Bird – FB 2. Hezron Murgha – WG 3. Brett Anderson – CE 4. Ty Williams (c) – CE 5. Michael Bani* – WG 6. Clint Amos* – FE 7. Ryan Ghietti – HB 8. Luke Harlen – PR 9. Jason Roos – HK 10. Ben Laity – PR 11. Blake Leary* – SR 12. Mark Cantoni – SR 13. Joel Riethmuller* – LK
Interchange: 14. Jack Cooper*, 15. Noel Underwood, 16. Ricky Thorby*, 17. Alex Starmer.
* = Cowboys allocation.
Unavailable: Joel Riethmuller* (signed to North Queensland Cowboys), Rod Jensen (ribs), Mick Wilson (groin), Ben Spina (broken finger, Sheldon Powe-Hobbs (broken nose).
Wynnum Manly Seagulls: 1. Jake Granville, 2. Denan Kemp, 3. Shea Moylan, 4. Matt Grieve, 5. Willie Taukafa, 6. Chris Birch, 7. Matt Seamark, 8. Mitchell Dodds, 9. John Tereo, 10. Willie Scanlan, 11. Dane Carlaw, 12. John Grieve, 13. Luke Dalziel-Don.
Interchange: 14. Aoterangi Herangi, 15. Kurtis Lingwoodock, 16. Hanan Laban, 17. Ben Shea.
Coach: Paul Green.
- Note: The first grade game was preceded by the Cyril Connell Challenge U-16s game and the Mal Meninga Cup U-18s game - the first time all three Pride teams played at the same venue. Previously, the academy teams had played at Jones Park or Pride Oval.
  Bay FM Radio (100.3 MHz) commentary team Mike Higgison and Troy Robbins called the match live from Cairns.
  This was the Pride debut for North Queensland Cowboys allocation player Ricky Thorby* (Pride Player 067).

Position	Round 2 – 2011	P	W	D	L	For	Against	Diff	Pts
1	Northern Pride	2	2	0	0	65	16	+49	4

ROUND 3: Hostplus Cup 2011

Saturday
2 April 2011
15:00 AEST (UTC+10)

Easts Tigers	16 – 26	Northern Pride
Tries: Kevin Stephensen 2 Matt Zgrajewski 1 Goals: Matt Minto 2	Cairns Post Report; Video Highlights	Tries: 1 Brett Anderson; 1 Ty Williams; 1 Ryan Ghietti; 1 Jason Roos; 1 Luke Harlen; Goals: 3 Chey Bird

Langlands Park
(Stones Corner, Brisbane, QLD)

Skill360 Northern Pride: 1. Chey Bird – FB 2. Hezron Murgha – WG 3. Brett Anderson – CE 4. Ty Williams (c) – CE 5. Michael Bani* – WG 6. Clint Amos* – FE 7. Ryan Ghietti – HB 8. Luke Harlen – PR 9. Jason Roos – HK 10. Ben Laity – PR 11. Blake Leary* – SR 12. Mark Cantoni – SR 13. Joel Riethmuller* – LK
Interchange: 14. Rod Jensen, 15. Noel Underwood, 16. Ricky Thorby*, 17. Alex Starmer.
* = Cowboys allocation.
Unavailable: Joel Riethmuller* (signed to North Queensland Cowboys), Mick Wilson (groin).
Easts Tigers: 1. Dane Chisholm, 2. Paoa Faamita, 3. Shane Neumann(c), 4. Liam Campbell, 5. Elijah Niko, 6. Isaac Kaufmann, 7. Matt Minto, 8. James Stosic, 9. Geoff Holcombe, 10. Mitchel Johnson, 11. Fred Pakutoa, 12. Steve Thorpe, 13. Mark Offerdahl.
Interchange: 14. Matt Zgrajewski, 15. Liufau Hala, 16. Leon Panapa, 17. McKanah Gibson.
Coach: Troy McCarthy.

Position	Round 3 – 2011	P	W	D	L	For	Against	Diff	Pts
2	Northern Pride	3	3	0	0	91	32	+59	6

ROUND 4: Hostplus Cup 2011

Sunday
10 April 2011
14:00 AEST (UTC+10)

Burleigh Bears	6 – 30	Northern Pride
Tries: Anthony Don 1 Goals: Nick Parfitt 1	Cairns Post Report; Video Highlights	Tries: 2 Rod Jensen; 1 Brett Anderson; 1 Ty Williams; 1 Ryan Ghietti; 1 Alex Starmer; Goals: 3 Chey Bird

Pizzey Park
(Miami, Gold Coast, QLD)

Skill360 Northern Pride: 1. Chey Bird – FB 2. Hezron Murgha – WG 3. Brett Anderson – CE 18. Will Tupou* – CE 5. Rod Jensen – WG 4. Ty Williams (c) – CE 7. Ryan Ghietti – HB 8. Luke Harlen – PR 9. Jason Roos – HK 10. Ben Laity – PR 11. Blake Leary* – SR 12. Mark Cantoni – SR 13. Joel Riethmuller* – LK
Interchange: 6. Clint Amos*, 15. Noel Underwood, 16. Ricky Thorby*, 17. Alex Starmer.
* = Cowboys allocation.
Unavailable: Joel Riethmuller* (signed to North Queensland Cowboys), Mick Wilson (groin), Michael Bani* (ankle).
Late change: Clint Amos* suffered food poisoning on Friday night, so was moved to the bench. Ty Williams was switched to five-eighth.
Burleigh Bears: 1. Jamie Dowling, 2. Anthony Don, 3. Brad Cross, 4. Clinton Toopi, 5. Joe Vickery, 6. Luke Keary, 7. Brent McConnell, 8. Liam McDonald, 9. Kurt Sorensen, 10. Martin Griese, 11. Josh White (c), 12. Jimmy Andersen, 13. Matt Pow.
Interchange: 14. Blake Morrison, 15. Shaun Spring, 16. Chris Hodges, 17. Seb Davies.
Coach: Paul Bramley.
- Note: This was Ben Laity's 150th Queensland Cup game.
  This was the Pride debut for North Queensland Cowboys allocation player Will Tupou* (Pride Player 069).
  The Pride began posting live score updates on their Facebook page.

Position	Round 4 – 2011	P	W	D	L	For	Against	Diff	Pts
1	Northern Pride	4	4	0	0	121	38	+83	8

ROUND 5: Hostplus Cup 2011

Saturday
16 April 2011
17:30 AEST (UTC+10)

Northern Pride	60 – 10	Sunshine Coast Sea Eagles
Tries: Mark Dalle Cort 2 Mark Cantoni 2 Brett Anderson 1 Rod Jensen 1 Ryan Ghietti 1 Luke Harlen 1 Lancen Joudo 1 Noel Underwood 1 Goals: Chey Bird 10	Cairns Post Report; Video Highlights	Tries: 2 Malcolm Congoo Goals: 1 Malcolm Congoo

Barlow Park
(Severin Street, Parramatta Park, QLD)

Skill360 Northern Pride: 1. Chey Bird – FB 2. Hezron Murgha – WG 3. Brett Anderson – CE 5. Rod Jensen – CE 18. Mark Dalle Cort – WG 6. Ty Williams (c) – FE 7. Ryan Ghietti – HB 8. Luke Harlen – PR 9. Jason Roos – HK 10. Ben Laity – PR 11. Clint Amos* – SR 12. Mark Cantoni – SR 13. Joel Riethmuller* – LK
Interchange: 14. Lancen Joudo, 15. Noel Underwood, 16. Jack Cooper*, 17. Alex Starmer.
* = Cowboys allocation.
Unavailable: Joel Riethmuller* (signed to North Queensland Cowboys), Mick Wilson (groin).
Sunshine Coast Sea Eagles: 1. Malcolm Congoo, 2. Zane McCarthy, 3. Rowan Klein, 4. Hughie Stanley, 5. Tyrone Coppedge, 6. Kane Richards, 7. Nick Swan, 8. Alex Simpson, 9. Robert Congoo, 10. Dario Esposito, 11. Jaz Nahu-Main, 12. Wiremu Ratana, 13. Steven Spencer.
Interchange: 14. Troy Mendham, 15. Martin Cordwell, 16. Joel McCrea, 17. Jon Platt.
Coach: Adam Mogg.
- Note: This was the Pride's 17th successive victory – a Queensland Cup record previously held by the Burleigh Bears and North Queensland Young Guns with 16 consecutive wins. The Pride set several club records in this game:
  * The biggest winning score in the Pride's history
  * The biggest winning margin in the Pride's history
  * The first time the Pride have ever beaten the Sunshine Coast Sea Eagles
  * The most tries by the Pride in a single game
  * The most goals in a single Pride game (Chey Bird, 10)
  * Most consecutive wins in QCup - 17 (Round 14 2010 - current).
  This was the Pride debut for North Queensland Cowboys allocation player Lancen Joudo* (Pride Player 068).

Position	Round 5 – 2011	P	W	D	L	For	Against	Diff	Pts
1	Northern Pride	5	5	0	0	181	48	+133	10

ROUND 6: Hostplus Cup 2011

Saturday
23 April 2011
14:00 AEST (UTC+10)

Ipswich Jets	12 – 12	Northern Pride
Tries: Marshall Chalk 1 Joseph Tomane 1 Goals: Brendon Lindsay 2	Cairns Post Report; Video Highlights	Tries: 1 Joel Riethmuller*; 1 Mark Cantoni; Goals: 2 Chey Bird

North Ipswich Reserve
(Ipswich, QLD)
Broadcast live on ABC 1 TV
Referee: Justin Davis

Skill360 Northern Pride: 1. Chey Bird – FB 2. Hezron Murgha – WG 3. Brett Anderson – CE 4. Rod Jensen – CE 5. Mark Dalle Cort – WG 6. Ty Williams (c) – FE 7. Ryan Ghietti – HB 8. Luke Harlen – PR 9. Jason Roos – HK 10. Ben Laity – PR 17. Ricky Thorby* 12. Mark Cantoni – SR 13. Joel Riethmuller* – LK
Interchange: 15. Noel Underwood, 16. Jack Cooper*, 18. Alex Starmer, 19. James Segeyaro*.
* = Cowboys allocation.
Unavailable: Mick Wilson (groin).
Ipswich Jets: 1. Marshall Chalk, 2. Ramon Filipine, 3. Donald Malone, 4. Joseph Tomane, 5. Luke Walker, 6. Brendon Lindsay, 7. Todd Riggs, 8. Tyson Lofipo, 9. Michael Fisher, 10. Trevor Exton, 11. Jacob Ling, 12. Lorenzo Maafu, 13. Keiron Lander.
Interchange: 15. Nathaniel Neale, 16. Sam Martin, 17. Smith Samau, 18. Ian Lacey.
- Note: Broadcast live on ABC 1 TV with ABC Sport's Gerry Collins, Warren Boland and David Wright.

Position	Round 6 – 2011	P	W	D	L	For	Against	Diff	Pts
3	Northern Pride	6	5	1	0	193	60	+133	11

ROUND 7: Hostplus Cup 2011

Split Round Week 2
Sunday
8 May 2011
14:00 AEST (UTC+10)

Northern Pride	36 – 28	Redcliffe Dolphins
Tries: Lancen Joudo 2 Brett Anderson 1 Davin Crampton 1 Blake Leary* 1 Jason Roos 1 Goals: Chey Bird 6	Cairns Post Report; Video Highlights	Tries: 2 Justin Hunt; 1 Hayden Topliss; 1 Joe Bond; 1 Troy Giess Goals: 3 Liam Georgetown; 1 Hayden Topliss

Barlow Park
(Severin Street, Parramatta Park, QLD)
Referee: Nick Kalpakidis

Skill360 Northern Pride: 1. Chey Bird – FB 2. Hezron Murgha – WG 3. Brett Anderson – CE 4. Davin Crampton – CE 5. Mark Dalle Cort – WG 6. Ty Williams (c) – FE 7. Ryan Ghietti – HB 8. Luke Harlen – PR 9. Jason Roos – HK 10. Ben Laity, – PR 15. Noel Underwood – SR 12. Mark Cantoni – SR 11. Blake Leary* – LK
Interchange: 14. Lancen Joudo, 16. Jack Cooper*, 17. Ricky Thorby*, 18. Ben Spina.
* = Cowboys allocation.
Unavailable: Mick Wilson (groin).
Redcliffe Dolphins: 1. Justin Hunt, 2. Hayden Topliss, 3. Paul Ivan, 4. Marty Hatfield, 5. Liam Georgetown, 6. Todd Murphy, 7. Dan Cross, 8. Chris Farrell, 9. Tom Butterfield, 10. Matt Britt, 11. Nick Slyney, 12. Troy Giess, 13. Derrick Watkins.
Interchange: 14. Shane Tronc, 15. Greg Byrnes, 16. Matt Handcock, 17. Allan Heldsinger.
Coach: John Dixon.
- Note: This was Brett Anderson's 50th Queensland Cup game.
  This was the Pride's 19th consecutive undefeated game.
  This was the Pride debut for Davin Crampton (Pride Player 070).

Position	Round 7 – 2011	P	W	D	L	For	Against	Diff	Pts
2	Northern Pride	7	6	1	0	229	88	+141	13

ROUND 8: Hostplus Cup 2011

Sunday
15 May 2011
15:00 AEST (UTC+10)

Mackay Cutters	22 – 18	Northern Pride
Tries: Michael Comerford 1 Zac Dalton 1 Clint Amos* 2 Goals: Liam Taylor 3	Cairns Post Report; Video Highlights	Tries: 1 Brett Anderson; 1 Blake Leary*; 1 Luke Harlen; Goals: 3 Chey Bird

Shark Park
(Milton Street, Mackay, QLD)

Skill360 Northern Pride: 1. Chey Bird – FB 2. Rod Jensen – WG 3. Brett Anderson – CE 4. Davin Crampton – CE 5. Mark Dalle Cort – WG 6. Ty Williams (c) – FE 7. Ryan Ghietti – HB 8. Luke Harlen – PR 9. Jason Roos – HK 10. Ben Laity – PR 11. Blake Leary* – SR 12. Mark Cantoni – SR 13. Joel Riethmuller* – LK
Interchange: 14. Lancen Joudo, 15. Noel Underwood, 16. Jack Cooper*, 17. Ricky Thorby*.
* = Cowboys allocation.
Unavailable: Mick Wilson (groin), Ben Spina (called up to play for the North Queensland Cowboys).
STM Mackay Cutters: 1. Shannon Gallant, 2. Liam Taylor, 3. Michael Comerford, 4. Will Tupou*, 5. Chris Giumelli, 6. Ben Jones, 7. Grant Rovelli (c), 8. Isaak Ah Mau, 9. Neil Budworth, 10. Lewis Balcomb, 11. Tyson Martin, 12. Darren Griffiths, 13. Jardine Bobongie.
Interchange: 14. Clint Amos*, 15. Grant Moore, 16. Leeson Ah Mau*, 17. Zac Dalton.
Coach: Anthony Seibold.
- Note: The Pride and Cutters wore red socks to raise money for the Australian Red Cross Blood Service.
  This was the Pride's first loss in 11 months.

Position	Round 8 – 2011	P	W	D	L	For	Against	Diff	Pts
2	Northern Pride	8	6	1	1	247	110	+137	13

ROUND 9: Hostplus Cup 2011

Saturday
21 May 2011
17:30 AEST (UTC+10)

Northern Pride	36 – 6	Souths Logan Magpies
Tries: Chey Bird 1 Rod Jensen 1 Brett Anderson 1 Ty Williams 1 Ryan Ghietti 1 Mark Cantoni 1 Goals: Chey Bird 6	Half-time: 0 – 6 Cairns Post Report; Video Highlights	Tries: 1 Ben Cronin Goals: 1 Mick Picker

Barlow Park
(Severin Street, Parramatta Park, QLD)

Skill360 Northern Pride: 1. Chey Bird – FB 2. Rod Jensen – WG 3. Brett Anderson – CE 4. Davin Crampton – CE 5. Mark Dalle Cort – WG 6. Ty Williams (c) – FE 7. Ryan Ghietti – HB 8. Luke Harlen – PR 9. Jason Roos – HK 10. Ben Laity – PR 11. Blake Leary* – SR 12. Mark Cantoni – SR 13. Joel Riethmuller* – LK
Interchange: 14. James Segeyaro*, 15. Noel Underwood, 16. Ben Spina, 17. Ricky Thorby*.
* = Cowboys allocation.
Unavailable: Mick Wilson (groin).
Souths Logan Magpies: 1. David Milne, 2. Daniel Vidot, 3. Jamie Dodt, 4. Corey Thompson, 5. Wade Liddell (c), 6. Ben Cronin, 7. Mick Picker, 8. Nick Skinner, 9. Travis Waddell, 10. Mark Appleton, 11. Mark Nicholls, 12. Mat Pitman, 13. Jarrad Kennedy.
Interchange: 14. Rez Phillips, 15. Dane Phillips, 16. Andrew Edwards, 17. Sam Crabb.
Coach: Mark Beaumont.
- Note: Ty Williams left the field in the second half with a bicep injury.
  The Magpies led 6–0 at half-time, but conceded six tries to nil in the second half.

Position	Round 9 – 2011	P	W	D	L	For	Against	Diff	Pts
2	Northern Pride	9	7	1	1	283	116	+167	15

ROUND 10: Hostplus Cup 2011

Saturday
28 May 2011
17:30 AEST (UTC+10)

Northern Pride	24 – 18	Norths Devils
Tries: Brett Anderson 1 Mark Dalle Cort 1 Ryan Ghietti 1 Joel Riethmuller* 1 Goals: Chey Bird 4 (4 from 4)	Cairns Post Report; Video Highlights	Tries: 1 Javarn White; 1 Daniel Ogden; 1Troyden Watene Goals: 3 Troyden Watene

Barlow Park
(Severin Street, Parramatta Park, QLD)

Skill360 Northern Pride: 1. Chey Bird (c) – FB 2. Rod Jensen – WG 3. Brett Anderson – CE 4. Davin Crampton – CE 5. Mark Dalle Cort – WG 19. Shaun Nona – FE 7. Ryan Ghietti – HB 8. Luke Harlen – PR 9. Jason Roos – HK 10. Ben Laity – PR 11. Blake Leary* – SR 12. Mark Cantoni – SR 13. Joel Riethmuller* – LK
Interchange: 14. Lancen Joudo, 16. Ben Spina, 17. Ricky Thorby*, 20. Alex Starmer.
* = Cowboys allocation.
Unavailable: Ty Williams (bicep), Mick Wilson (groin).
Norths Devils: ?
- Note: This was a rematch of last year's Grand Final. The Pride's win meant they had now been undefeated at home for 15 consecutive matches.
  This was the Pride debut for Shaun Nona (Pride Player 071).

Position	Round 10 – 2011	P	W	D	L	For	Against	Diff	Pts
2	Northern Pride	10	8	1	1	307	134	+173	17

ROUND 11: Hostplus Cup 2011

Saturday
4 June 2011
14:00 AEST (UTC+10)

Tweed Heads Seagulls	26 – 12	Northern Pride
Tries: Daniel Bartlett 1 Mitch Zornig 1 Dallas Williams 1 Tevita Latu 1 Tim Glasby 1 Goals: Nat Bowman 4 Field goal: Nat Bowman 1 Ian Webster 1	Cairns Post Report; Video Highlights	Tries: 1 Chey Bird; 1 Davin Crampton Goals: 2 Chey Bird; Field goal: 0

Piggabeen Sports Complex
(Caramar Drive, Tweed Heads West, NSW)
Broadcast live on ABC 1 TV

Skill360 Northern Pride: 1. Chey Bird (c) – FB 2. Rod Jensen – WG 3. Brett Anderson – CE 4. Davin Crampton – CE 5. Mark Dalle Cort – WG 6. Shaun Nona – FE 7. Ryan Ghietti – HB 8. Luke Harlen – PR 9. Jason Roos – HK 10. Ben Laity, – PR 15. Ben Spina – SR 12. Mark Cantoni – SR 13. Joel Riethmuller* – LK
Interchange: 14. Lancen Joudo , 16. Ricky Thorby*, 17. Alex Starmer, 18. Sheldon Powe-Hobbs
* = Cowboys allocation.
Unavailable: Ty Williams (bicep), Blake Leary* (knee), Hezron Murgha (shoulder).
Tweed Heads Seagulls: 1. Shannon Walker, 2. Ryan Milligan, 3. James Wood, 4. Dominique Peyroux, 5. Tom Merritt, 6. Matt King, 7. Brad Davis, 8. Aaron Cannings, 9. Kayne Lawton, 10. Brock Hunter, 11. Ryan Simpkins, 12. Selasie Berdie, 13. Cody Nelson.
Interchange: 15. Will Matthews, 16. Josh Starling, 17. Rod Griffin, 18. Dean Murphy.
- Note: Broadcast live on ABC 1 TV with ABC Sport's Gerry Collins, Warren Boland and David Wright – top of the table clash between Tweed Heads Seagulls (won all 10 games so far this season) and the Pride (won 8, drawn 1)
  This was Alex Starmer's 50th game for the Pride.
  This was the Pride debut for Sheldon Powe-Hobbs (Pride Player 072).

Position	Round 11 – 2011	P	W	D	L	For	Against	Diff	Pts
2	Northern Pride	11	8	1	2	319	160	+159	17

ROUND 12: Hostplus Cup 2011

Friday
10 June 2011
19:00 AEST (UTC+10)

Northern Pride	22 – 30	Central Comets
Tries: James Segeyaro* 1 Davin Crampton 1 Mark Dalle Cort 1 Mark Cantoni 1 Goals: Chey Bird 3	Cairns Post Report; Video Highlights	Tries: ? Goals: ?

Barlow Park
(Severin Street, Parramatta Park, QLD)

Skill360 Northern Pride: 1. Chey Bird (c) – FB 15. Rod Jensen – WG 3. Brett Anderson – CE 4. Davin Crampton – CE 5. Mark Dalle Cort – WG 6. Shaun Nona – FE 7. Ryan Ghietti – HB 8. Luke Harlen – PR 9. Jason Roos – HK 10. Ben Laity – PR 11. Ricky Thorby* – SR 12. Mark Cantoni – SR 14. Lancen Joudo – LK
Interchange: 16. Ben Spina, 17. Alex Starmer 18. Noel Underwood, 19. James Segeyaro*.
* = Cowboys allocation.
Unavailable: Ty Williams (bicep).
Central Comets: 1. Daniel Bartlett, 2. Joshua Speer, 3. Tyron Haynes, 4. Mitch Zornig, 5. Dallas Williams, 6. Tevita Latu, 7. Nat Bowman, 8. James Taputu-Crombie, 9. Guy Ford, 10. Tim Glasby, 11. Guy Williams (c), 12. Darren Mapp, 13. Nathan Barraclough.
Interchange: 14. Chris Gesch, 15. Neale Wyatt, 16. Brent Williams, 17. Benjamin Faulkner.
Coach: Wayne Barnett.
- Note: This was the first Friday night game this season.
  Joel Riethmuller* played his 100th Queensland Cup game (Ipswich Jets and Pride).

Position	Round 12 – 2011	P	W	D	L	For	Against	Diff	Pts
3	Northern Pride	12	8	1	3	341	190	+151	17

ROUND 13: Hostplus Cup 2011

Saturday
18 June 2011
14:00 AEST (UTC+10)

Wynnum-Manly Seagulls	30 – 28	Northern Pride
Tries: Jake Granville 1 Shea Moylan 1 Jason Moon 1 John Te Reo 1 Kurtis Lingwoodock 1 Goals: Josh Jerome 5	Half-time: 0 – 16; Cairns Post Report; Video Highlights	Tries: 1 Hezron Murgha; 1 Mick Wilson; 1 Ryan Ghietti; 1 Lancen Joudo; 1 Mark Cantoni; Goals: 4 Chey Bird

BMD Kougari Oval
(Manly West, Brisbane, QLD)
Broadcast live on ABC 1 TV

Skill360 Northern Pride: 1. Chey Bird (c) – FB 2. Hezron Murgha – WG 3. Brett Anderson – CE 4. Davin Crampton – CE 5. Rod Jensen – WG 6. Mick Wilson – FE 7. Ryan Ghietti – HB 17. Alex Starmer – PR 9. Jason Roos – HK 10. Ben Laity – PR 8. Luke Harlen – SR 12. Mark Cantoni – SR 13. Lancen Joudo – LK
Interchange: 11. Ricky Thorby*, 15. Ben Spina, 16. Noel Underwood, 18. Sheldon Powe-Hobbs.
* = Cowboys allocation.
Unavailable: Ty Williams (bicep).
Wynnum-Manly Seagulls: ?
- Note: Broadcast live on ABC 1 TV with ABC Sport's Gerry Collins, Warren Boland and David Wright.
  This was the Pride debut for Mick Wilson (Pride Player 073).

Position	Round 13 – 2011	P	W	D	L	For	Against	Diff	Pts
3	Northern Pride	13	8	1	4	369	220	+149	17

ROUND 14: Hostplus Cup 2011

Saturday
25 June 2011
17:30 AEST (UTC+10)

Northern Pride	32 – 16	Easts Tigers
Tries: Brett Anderson 4 Hezron Murgha 1 Cory Paterson* 1 Goals: Chey Bird 4	Half-time: 32 – 0 Cairns Post Report; Video Highlights	Tries: 1 Dane Chisholm; 1 Fred Pakutoa; 1 Lance Morris; Goals: 2 Adam Breen

Barlow Park
(Severin Street, Parramatta Park, QLD)
Referee: Shane Spicer

Skill360 Northern Pride: 1. Chey Bird (c) – FB 2. Hezron Murgha – WG 3. Brett Anderson – CE 4. Rod Jensen – CE 5. Mark Dalle Cort – WG 6. Mick Wilson – FE 7. Ryan Ghietti – HB 8. Luke Harlen – PR 9. Jason Roos – HK 10. Ben Laity – PR 11. Cory Paterson* – SR 12. Mark Cantoni – SR 13. Ben Spina – LK
Interchange: 14. Lancen Joudo, 15. Sheldon Powe-Hobbs, 16. Noel Underwood, 17. Ricky Thorby*.
* = Cowboys allocation.
Unavailable: Ty Williams (bicep), Davin Crampton (knee).
Easts Tigers: 1. Kevin Stephensen, 2. Adam Breen, 3. Lance Morris, 4. Liam Campbell, 5. Elijah Niko, 6. Dane Chisholm, 7. Isaac Kaufmann, 8. Matthew Zgrajewski, 9. Geoff Holcombe, 10. Mark Offerdahl, 11. Steven Thorpe, 12. Leon Panapa, 13. Anthony Boyd.
Interchange: 14. Liufau Hala, 15. Tom MacGougan, 16. Brett Zgrajewski, 17. McKanah Gibson.
Coach: Troy McCarthy
- Note: Noel Underwood played his 50th Queensland Cup match.
  This was the Pride debut for North Queensland Cowboys allocation player Cory Paterson* who was recovering from knee surgery. (Pride Player 074).

Position	Round 14 – 2011	P	W	D	L	For	Against	Diff	Pts
3	Northern Pride	14	9	1	4	401	236	+165	17

ROUND 15: Hostplus Cup 2011

Friday
8 July 2011
19:00 AEST (UTC+10)

Northern Pride	25 – 25	Burleigh Bears
Tries: Rod Jensen 2 Ben Spina 1 Luke Saunders 1 Goals: Chey Bird 4 Field goal: Hezron Murgha 1	Cairns Post Report; Video Highlights	Tries: 1 Nick Parfitt; 1 Joe Vickery; 1 Shaun Spring; 1 Louis Fanenetries; Goals: 4 Nick Parfitt; Field goal: 1 Nick Parfitt

Barlow Park
(Severin Street, Parramatta Park, QLD)
Referee: Chris Butler

Skill360 Northern Pride: 1. Chey Bird (c) – FB 2. Hezron Murgha – WG 3. Brett Anderson – CE 4. Rod Jensen – CE 5. Mark Dalle Cort – WG 6. Mick Wilson – FE 7. Ryan Ghietti – HB 8. Luke Harlen – PR 9. Jason Roos – HK 10. Ben Laity – PR 11. Lancen Joudo – SR 12. Mark Cantoni – SR 13. Ben Spina – LK
Interchange: 14. Luke Saunders, 15. Sheldon Powe-Hobbs, 16. Noel Underwood, 17. Ricky Thorby*.
* = Cowboys allocation.
Unavailable: Ty Williams (bicep).
Burleigh Bears: ?
- Note: The Pride wore a special green NAIDOC jersey.
  This was the Pride's second Friday night match this season.
  Noel Underwood played his 50th Queensland Cup match.
  This was the Pride debut for Luke Saunders (Pride Player 075).

Position	Round 15 – 2011	P	W	D	L	For	Against	Diff	Pts
3	Northern Pride	15	9	2	4	426	261	+165	20

ROUND 16: Hostplus Cup 2011

Friday
15 July 2011
19:30 AEST (UTC+10)

Sunshine Coast Sea Eagles	10 – 20	Northern Pride
Tries: Mitchell Buckett 1 Wiremu Ratana 1 Goals: Hughie Stanley 1	Cairns Post Report; Video Highlights	Tries: 2 Lancen Joudo; 1 Hezron Murgha; 1 Mark Dalle Cort; Goals: 2 Chey Bird

Stockland Park
(Sportsmans Parade, Bokarina, Kawana Waters, QLD)
Referee: v

Skill360 Northern Pride: 1. Ben Fitzpatrick – FB 2. Hezron Murgha – WG 3. Chey Bird (c) – CE 4. Rod Jensen – CE 5. Mark Dalle Cort – WG 6. Mick Wilson – FE 7. Ryan Ghietti – HB 8. Luke Harlen – PR 9. Jason Roos – HK 10. Ben Laity – PR 11. Luke Saunders – SR 12. Mark Cantoni – SR 13. Ben Spina – LK
Interchange: 14. Lancen Joudo, 15. Noel Underwood, 16. Ricky Thorby*, 17. Alex Starmer.
* = Cowboys allocation.
Unavailable: Ty Williams (bicep), Brett Anderson (shoulder).
Sunshine Coast Sea Eagles: 1. Hughie Stanley, 2. Malcolm Congoo, 3. Maa Ruua, 4. Rowan Klein, 5. Kristian Freed, 6. Callum Klein, 7. Nick Swan, 8. Wiremu Ratana, 9. Matt Chapman, 10. Alex Simpson, 11. Jaz Nahu-Main, 12. Steven Spencer, 13. Jono Muir.
Interchange: 14. Robert Congoo, 15. Jon Platt, 16. James Boyce, 17. Martin Cordwell.
Coach: Adam Mogg.

Position	Round 16 – 2011	P	W	D	L	For	Against	Diff	Pts
3	Northern Pride	16	10	2	4	446	271	+175	22

ROUND 17: Hostplus Cup 2011

Split Round
Saturday
30 July 2011
17:30 AEST (UTC+10)

Northern Pride	36 – 20	Ipswich Jets
Tries: Ricky Thorby* 2 Michael Bani* 1 Mick Wilson 1 Ryan Ghietti 1 Jason Roos 1 Goals: Chey Bird 6	Cairns Post Report; Video Highlights	Tries: 2 Donald Malone; 1 Luke Capewell; 1 Michael Fisher Goals: 2 Brendon Lindsay

Barlow Park
(Severin Street, Parramatta Park, QLD)

Skill360 Northern Pride: 1. Ben Fitzpatrick – FB 2. Hezron Murgha – WG 3. Chey Bird (c) – CE 4. Rod Jensen – CE 5. Michael Bani* – WG 6. Mick Wilson – FE 7. Ryan Ghietti – HB 8. Luke Harlen – PR 9. Jason Roos – HK 10. Ben Laity – PR 11. Scott Bolton* – SR 12. Mark Cantoni – SR 13. Joel Riethmuller* – LK
Interchange: 14. Ben Spina, 15. Mark Dalle Cort, 16. Ricky Thorby*, 17. Alex Starmer.
* = Cowboys allocation.
Unavailable: Ty Williams (bicep), Brett Anderson (shoulder).
Ipswich Jets: 1. Luke Walker, 2. Ramon Filipine, 3. Donald Malone, 4. Brendon Marshall, 5. Jarrod McInally, 6. Brendon Lindsay, 7. Todd Riggs, 8. Joseph Tomane, 9. Michael Fisher, 10. Trevor Exton, 11. Jacob Ling, 12. Lorenzo Maafu, 13. Keiron Lander.
Interchange: 15. Nathaniel Neale, 16. Smith Samau, 17. Slade King,18. Max Seumanutafa.
Coaches: Ben Walker & Shane Walker.

Position	Round 17 – 2011	P	W	D	L	For	Against	Diff	Pts
2	Northern Pride	17	11	2	4	482	291	+191	24

ROUND 18: Hostplus Cup 2011

Sunday
7 August 2011
14:00 AEST (UTC+10)

Redcliffe Dolphins	0 – 14	Northern Pride
Tries: Goals: 0	QRL Report; Video Highlights	Tries: 1 Ty Williams; 1 Ricky Thorby*; Goals: 3 Chey Bird

Dolphin Oval
(Klingner Road, Redcliffe, QLD)

Skill360 Northern Pride: 1. Ty Williams (c) – FB 2. Michael Bani* – WG 3. Brett Anderson – CE 4. Chey Bird – CE 5. Mark Dalle Cort – WG 6. Mick Wilson – FE 7. Ryan Ghietti – HB 8. Luke Harlen – PR 9. Jason Roos – HK 10. Ben Laity – PR 14. Ben Spina – SR 12. Mark Cantoni – SR 13. Joel Riethmuller* – LK
Interchange: 15. Rod Jensen, 16. Ricky Thorby*, 17. Alex Starmer, 19. Lancen Joudo.
* = Cowboys allocation.
Redcliffe Dolphins: 1. Justin Hunt, 2. Mitch Rivett, 3. Paul Ivan, 4. Marty Hatfield, 5. Liam Georgetown, 6. Joe Bond, 7. Dan Cross, 8. Chris Farrell (c), 9. Allan Heldsinger, 10. Dave Hala, 11. Nick Slyney, 12. Troy Giess, 13. James Ackerman.
Interchange: 14. Matt Handcock, 15. Adam Marr, 16. Derrick Watkins, 17. Tui Samoa.
Coach: John Dixon.
- Note: Rod Jensen played his 50th Queensland Cup game for the Pride (and his 69th overall including his time at the North Queensland Cowboys). Jensen has also played more than 100 ARL/NRL games for the Adelaide Rams, Canberra Raiders and North Queensland Cowboys, and 29 games for the Huddersfield Giants.

Position	Round 18 – 2011	P	W	D	L	For	Against	Diff	Pts
2	Northern Pride	18	12	2	4	496	291	+205	26

ROUND 19: Hostplus Cup 2011

Saturday
13 August 2011
17:30 AEST (UTC+10)

Northern Pride	30 – 10	Mackay Cutters
Tries: Brett Anderson 1 Mark Dalle Cort 1 Mick Wilson 1 Ryan Ghietti 1 Mark Cantoni 1 Goals: Chey Bird 5	QRL Report; Video Highlights	Tries: 1 Ben Jones; 1 Michael Comerford Goals: 1 Chad Grintell

Barlow Park
(Severin Street, Parramatta Park, QLD)

Skill360 Northern Pride: 1. Ty Williams (c) – FB 2. Michael Bani* – WG 3. Brett Anderson – CE 4. Chey Bird – CE 5. Mark Dalle Cort – WG 6. Mick Wilson – FE 7. Ryan Ghietti – HB 8. Luke Harlen – PR 9. Jason Roos – HK 10. Ben Laity – PR 11. Ben Spina – SR 12. Mark Cantoni – SR 13. Joel Riethmuller* – LK
Interchange: 14. Lancen Joudo, 15. Rod Jensen, 16. Ricky Thorby*, 17. Alex Starmer.
* = Cowboys allocation.
Mackay Cutters: 1. Shannon Gallant, 2. Liam Taylor, 3. Will Tupou*, 4. Chad Grintell, 5. Bureta Faraimo, 6. Ben Jones, 7. Grant Rovelli (c), 8. Isaak Ah Mau, 9. Neil Budworth, 10. Leeson Ah Mau, 11. Tyson Martin, 12. Darren Griffiths, 13. Jardine Bobongie.
Interchange: 14. Clint Amos*, 15. Grant Moore, 16. Zac Dalton, 17. Dylan Smith, 18. Michael Comerford.
Coach: Anthony Seibold.
- Note: Chey Bird (playing in the centres rather than his usual position of fullback) scored 5 goals, meaning he has scored 500 points for the club.

Position	Round 19 – 2011	P	W	D	L	For	Against	Diff	Pts
2	Northern Pride	19	13	2	4	526	301	+225	28

ROUND 20: Hostplus Cup 2011 - Tropical North Queensland TAFE Shield.

Saturday
20 August 2011
16:00 AEST (UTC+10)

Souths Logan Magpies	44 – 22	Northern Pride
Tries: Drury Low 2 Andrew Edwards 2 Mitch Cronin 1 Ben Cronin 1 Mark Ioane 1 Goals: Corey Thompson 6	QRL Report; Video Highlights	Tries: 1 Brett Anderson; 1 Mark Dalle Cort; 1 Cory Paterson*; 1 Ben Laity Goals: 3 Chey Bird

Yusia Ginau Oval
(Bamaga, Cape York, QLD)

Skill360 Northern Pride: 4. Chey Bird (c) – FB 2. Michael Bani* – WG 3. Brett Anderson – CE 19. Davin Crampton – CE 5. Mark Dalle Cort – WG 6. Mick Wilson – FE 7. Ryan Ghietti – HB 8. Luke Harlen – PR 9. Jason Roos – HK 10. Ben Laity – PR 20. Scott Bolton* – SR 12. Mark Cantoni – SR 18. Cory Paterson* – LK
Interchange: 11. Ben Spina, 14. 16. Ricky Thorby*, 17. Alex Starmer.
* = Cowboys allocation.
Unavailable: Ty Williams & Rod Jensen (injured), Joel Riethmuller* called up to play for the Cowboys.
Souths Logan Magpies: 1. Mitch Cronin, 2. Corey Thompson, 3. Drury Low, 4. Sosaia Makisi, 5. Wade Liddell, 6. Ben Cronin, 7. Dane Phillips, 8. Mark Appleton, 9. Travis Waddell, 10. Mark Ioane, 11. Mark Nicholls, 12. Nick Skinner, 13. Phil Dennis (c).
Interchange: 14. Rez Phillips, 15. Dashae Francis, 16. Andrew Edwards, 17. Sam Gardel.
Coach: Mark Beaumont.
- Note: This was the first time a Queensland Cup match was played in an Indigenous community. Both teams wore jerseys specially designed for this round. The Pride's was a (Northern Peninsula Area) indigenous jersey designed by Mario Assan.
  The success of this game led to the establishment of QRL's 'Country Week' initiative, where all matches in one round of the QCup competition are played in remote communities.

Position	Round 20 – 2011	P	W	D	L	For	Against	Diff	Pts
2	Northern Pride	20	13	2	5	548	341	+207	28

ROUND 21: Hostplus Cup 2011

Sunday
28 August 2011
15:00 AEST (UTC+10)

Norths Devils	22 – 32	Northern Pride
Tries: Daniel Ogden 2 Dylan Galloway 1 Matt Smith 1 Goals: Joel Bailey 3	QRL Report; Video Highlights	Tries: 1 Chey Bird; 1 Brett Anderson; 1 Ty Williams; 1 Joel Riethmuller*; 1 Cory Paterson*; 1 Ben Spina; Goals: 4 Chey Bird

Albert Bishop Park
(Hedley Avenue, Nundah QLD)
Referee: Chris Butler.

Skill360 Northern Pride: 1. Chey Bird – FB 2. Michael Bani* – WG 3. Brett Anderson – CE 4. Davin Crampton – CE 5. Mark Dalle Cort – WG 6. Ty Williams (c) – FE 7. Ryan Ghietti, – HB 17. Ricky Thorby* – PR 9. Jason Roos – HK 10. Ben Laity, – PR 16. Ben Spina – SR 12. Mark Cantoni – SR 13. Joel Riethmuller* – LK
Interchange: 8. Luke Harlen, 11. Cory Paterson*, 14. Mick Wilson, 15. Rod Jensen.
* = Cowboys allocation.
Norths Devils: 1. Javarn White, 2. Daniel Ogden, 3. Joel Bailey, 4. Zach Koitka, 5. Dylan Galloway, 6. Shane Perry, 7. Matt Smith, 8. Mark Vaiao, 9. Marc Brentnall, 10. Eddy Purcell, 11. Troyden Watene, 12. Trent Richardson, 13. Reece Watton.
Interchange: 14. Jay Aston, 15. Pat McPherson, 16. Ryan Hansen, 17. Simona Vavega.
Coach: Trevor Bailey.

Position	Round 21 – 2011	P	W	D	L	For	Against	Diff	Pts
2	Northern Pride	21	14	2	5	580	363	+217	30

ROUND 22 Hostplus Cup 2011

Friday
2 September 2011
19:00 AEST (UTC+10)

Northern Pride	16 – 10	Tweed Heads Seagulls
Tries: Michael Bani* 1 Brett Anderson 1 Goals: Chey Bird 4	QRL Report; Video Highlights	Tries: 1 Nat Barnes; 1 Matt King; Goals: 1 Brad Davis

Barlow Park
(Severin Street, Parramatta Park, QLD)

Skill360 Northern Pride: 1. Chey Bird – FB 2. Michael Bani* – WG 3. Brett Anderson – CE 4. Davin Crampton – CE 5. Mark Dalle Cort – WG 6. Ty Williams (c) – FE 7. Ryan Ghietti – HB 8. Luke Harlen – PR 9. Jason Roos – HK 10. Ben Laity – PR 11. Ben Spina – SR 12. Mark Cantoni – SR 13. Joel Riethmuller* – LK
Interchange: 14. Mick Wilson, 15. Rod Jensen, 16. Aidan Day, 17. Alex Starmer.
* = Cowboys allocation.
Tweed Heads Seagulls: 1. Ryan Milligan, 2. Nathanael Barnes, 3. James Wood, 4. Matt Hundy, 5. Tom Merritt, 6. Matt King, 7. Brad Davis (c), 8. Aaron Cannings, 9. Tim Maccan, 10. Josh Starling, 11. Ryan Simpkins, 12. Tom Kingston, 13. Rod Griffin.
Interchange: 14. Nathan Mossman, 15. Dean Murphy, 16. Jake Leary, 17. Brock Hunter.
Coach: Ben Anderson
- Note: This was the first game streamed live through the Pride's website.
  his was Ty Williams' 50th Queensland Cup game (he has also played for North Queensland Young Guns and Cairns Cyclones).
  At 4:30 pm on Monday 5 September the Pride players held a 'Run to the Finals' meet and greet autograph session at Ravizza Park, Edmonton.
  This was the Pride debut for Aidan Day (Pride Player 061).

Position	Round 22 – 2011	P	W	D	L	For	Against	Diff	Pts
2	Northern Pride	22	15	2	5	596	373	+223	32

=== 2011 Ladder ===
2011 Queensland Cup
Pos	Team	Pld	W	D	L	PF	PA	PD	Pts
1	Tweed Heads Seagulls	22	20	1	1	578	288	290	41
2	Northern Pride	22	15	2	5	596	373	223	32
3	Souths Logan Magpies	22	15	1	6	555	427	128	31
4	Redcliffe Dolphins	22	14	1	7	514	368	146	29
5	Ipswich Jets	22	11	4	7	560	386	174	26
6	Wynnum Manly Seagulls (P)	22	10	1	11	488	461	27	21
7	Burleigh Bears	22	8	2	12	382	460	-78	18
8	Easts Tigers	22	8	1	13	428	524	-96	17
9	Mackay Cutters	22	8	1	13	369	473	-104	17
10	Norths Devils	22	7	0	15	432	560	-128	14
11	Central Comets	22	7	0	15	425	634	-209	14
12	Sunshine Coast Sea Eagles	22	2	0	20	350	723	-373	4

==== Northern Pride (regular season 2011) ====
- Win = 15 (9 of 11 home games, 6 of 11 away games)
- Loss = 5 (1 of 11 home games, 4 of 11 away games)
- Draw = 2 (1 of 11 home games, 1 of 11 away games)

Round	1	2	3	4	5	6	7	8	9	10	11	12	13	14	15	16	17	18	19	20	21	22
Result	W	W	W	W	W	D	W	L	W	W	L	L	L	W	D	W	W	W	W	L	W	W
Ground	A	H	A	A	H	A	H	A	H	H	A	H	A	H	H	A	H	A	H	A	A	H

Source: https://web.archive.org/web/20111008022440/http://www.qrl.com.au/
A = Away; H = Home; B = Bye; W = Win; D = Draw; L = Loss

== Finals Series ==
Semifinals
1	Tweed Heads Seagulls	12
6	Northern Pride	30
4	Souths Logan Magpies	20
5	Redcliffe Dolphins	22
2	Ipswich Jets	6
3	Wynnum Manly Seagulls	24

Preliminary Finals
1W	Northern Pride	10
1L	Tweed Heads Seagulls	26
2W	Redcliffe Dolphins	0
3W	Wynnum Manly Seagulls	36

Grand Final
Tweed Heads Seagulls	10
Wynnum Manly Seagulls	16

Finals Week 1 - Preliminary Final

Saturday
10 September 2011
17:30 AEST (UTC+10)

Northern Pride	30 – 6	Ipswich Jets
Tries: Chey Bird 1 Jason Roos 1 Rod Jensen 2 Ben Spina 1 Goals: Chey Bird 5	QRL Preview; QRL Report; Ty Williams interview	Tries: 1 Ian Lacey Goals: 1 Brendon Lindsay

Barlow Park
(Severin Street, Parramatta Park, QLD)
Attendance: 3,000+

Skill360 Northern Pride: 1. Chey Bird – FB 2. Michael Bani* – WG 3. Brett Anderson – CE 4. Davin Crampton – CE 5. Mark Dalle Cort – WG 6. Ty Williams (c) – FE 7. Ryan Ghietti – HB 8. Luke Harlen – PR 9. Jason Roos – HK 10. Ben Laity – PR 11. Ben Spina – SR 12. Mark Cantoni – SR 13. Joel Riethmuller* – LK
Interchange: 14. Mick Wilson, 15. Rod Jensen, 16. Noel Underwood, 17. Alex Starmer.
Ipswich Jets: 1. Luke Capewell, 2. Ramon Filipine, 3. Donald Malone, 4. Brendan Marshall, 5. Jarrod McInally, 6. Brendon Lindsay, 7. Ian Lacey, 8. Tyson Lofipo, 9. Michael Fisher, 10. Rowan Winterfield, 11. Jacob Ling, 12. TJ Fonoti, 13. Slade King.
Interchange: 15. Max Seumanutafa, 16. Nathaniel Neale, 17. Todd Riggs, 18. Kurt Capewell.
Coaches: Ben Walker & Shane Walker.
- Note: Luke Harlen played his 50th Queensland Cup game (for the Pride and North Queensland Cowboys) and Brett Anderson played his 50th game for the Pride (and 64th Queensland Cup game, having previously played for North Queensland Cowboys).
  The game was streamed live through the Pride's website.

Finals Week 2 - Semi-Final

Saturday
17 September 2011
14:00 AEST (UTC+10)

Tweed Heads Seagulls	26 – 10	Northern Pride
Tries: Tim Maccan 2 Nathanael Barnes 1 Tom Merritt 1 Goals: Brad Davis 5	QRL Preview; QRL Report	Tries: 1 Hezron Murgha; 1 Noel Underwood Goals: 1 Chey Bird

Dolphin Oval
(Klingner Road, Redcliffe, QLD)
Broadcast live on ABC 1 TV

Skill360 Northern Pride: 1. Chey Bird – FB 2. Michael Bani* – WG 3. Brett Anderson – CE 4. Davin Crampton – CE 5. Hezron Murgha – WG 6. Ty Williams (c) – FE 7. Ryan Ghietti – HB 8. Luke Harlen – PR 9. Jason Roos – HK 10. Ben Laity – PR 11. Ben Spina – SR 12. Mark Cantoni – SR 13. Joel Riethmuller* – LK
Interchange: 14. 14. Mick Wilson, 15. Rod Jensen, 16. Noel Underwood, 17. Alex Starmer.
Unavailable: Mark Dalle Cort (ankle).
Tweed Heads Seagulls: 1. Ryan Milligan, 2. Nathanael Barnes, 3. James Wood, 4. Matt Hundy, 5. Tom Merritt, 6. Matt King, 7. Brad Davis, 8. Aaron Cannings, 9. Tim Maccan, 10. Josh Starling, 11. Ryan Simpkins, 12. Selasi Berdie, 13. Cody Nelson.
Interchange: 14. Tom Kingston, 15. Rod Griffin, 16. Jake Leary, 17. Brock Hunter.
Coach: Ben Anderson.
- Note: Broadcast live on ABC 1 TV with ABC Sport's Gerry Collins, Warren Boland and David Wright.

== 2011 Northern Pride players ==
Pride player	Appearances	Tries	Goals	Field goals	Pts
Aidan Day	1	0	0	0	0
Alex Starmer	18	1	0	0	4
Ben Fitzpatrick	2	0	0	0	0
Ben Laity	24	1	0	0	4
Ben Spina	17	4	0	0	16
Brett Anderson	22	15	0	0	60
Chey Bird	24	5	97	0	214
Davin Crampton	12	3	0	0	12
Hezron Murgha	13	5	0	1	21
Jason Roos	24	4	0	0	16
Lancen Joudo	13	6	0	0	24
Luke Harlen	24	4	0	0	16
Luke Saunders	2	2	0	0	8
Mark Cantoni	24	8	0	0	32
Mark Dalle Cort	18	7	0	0	28
Mick Wilson	12	3	0	0	12
Noel Underwood	16	2	0	0	8
Rod Jensen	20	10	0	0	40
Ryan Ghietti	24	8	0	0	32
Shaun Nona	3	0	0	0	0
Sheldon Powe-Hobbs	4	0	0	0	0
Ty Williams	15	5	0	0	20

=== North Queensland Cowboys who played for the Pride in 2011 ===
Cowboys player	Appearances	Tries	Goals	Field goals	Pts
Blake Leary*	8	4	0	0	16
Clint Amos*	5	0	0	1	1
Cory Paterson*	3	3	0	0	12
Jack Cooper*	6	0	0	0	0
James Segeyaro*	4	3	0	0	12
Joel Riethmuller*	17	5	0	0	20
Kalifa Faifai Loa*	1	1	0	0	4
Michael Bani*	10	2	0	0	8
Ricky Thorby*	19	3	0	0	12
Scott Bolton*	2	0	0	0	0
Will Tupou*	1	0	0	0	0

== 2011 venues ==
Northern Pride venues

The Pride played matches at 14 different venues this year, 13 in Queensland and one in NSW:

- Callendar Park, Innisfail.
- Barlow Park, Cairns.
- Rugby Park, (Ayr.
- Browne Park, Rockhampton.
- Langlands Park, Brisbane.
- Pizzey Park, Gold Coast.
- North Ipswich Reserve, Ipswich.
- Shark Park, Mackay.
- Piggabeen Sports Complex, Tweed Heads West.
- BMD Kougari Oval, Brisbane.
- Stockland Park, Kawana Waters.
- Dolphin Oval, Redcliffe.
- Yusia Ginau Oval, (Bamaga, Cape York.
- Albert Bishop Park, Brisbane.
- Dolphin Oval, Redcliffe.

== 2011 Televised Games ==
In 2011 games were televised by ABC TV and shown live across Queensland through the ABC1 channel at 2.00pm (AEST) on Saturday afternoons. The commentary team was Gerry Collins, Warren Boland and David Wright.

In 2011 the Pride appeared in four televised games:

- Round 6: Northern Pride drew 12–12 with Ipswich Jets at North Ipswich Reserve, Ipswich.
- Round 11: Northern Pride lost 12–26 to Tweed Heads Seagulls at Piggabeen Sports Complex, Tweed Heads.
- Round 13: Northern Pride lost 28–30 to Wynnum-Manly Seagulls at BMD Kougari Oval, Brisbane.
- Semi-Final: Northern Pride lost 20–26 to Tweed Heads Seagulls at Dolphin Oval, Redcliffe.
