= Tim Maccan =

Italy international rugby league footballer (born 1982)

Personal information
- Born: 5 June 1982 (age 44) Sydney, New South Wales, Australia

Playing information
- Position: Halfback
Representative
Years	Team	Pld	T	G	FG	P
2013	Italy	1	0	0	0	0

Tim Maccan is an Australian rugby league footballer who was selected for Italy in the 2013 Rugby League World Cup.

== Playing career ==
Maccan played for the Tweed Heads Seagulls as a halfback.

In 2013, Maccan was named in the Italy squad for the World Cup.
