= Lancen Joudo =

Australian rugby league footballer

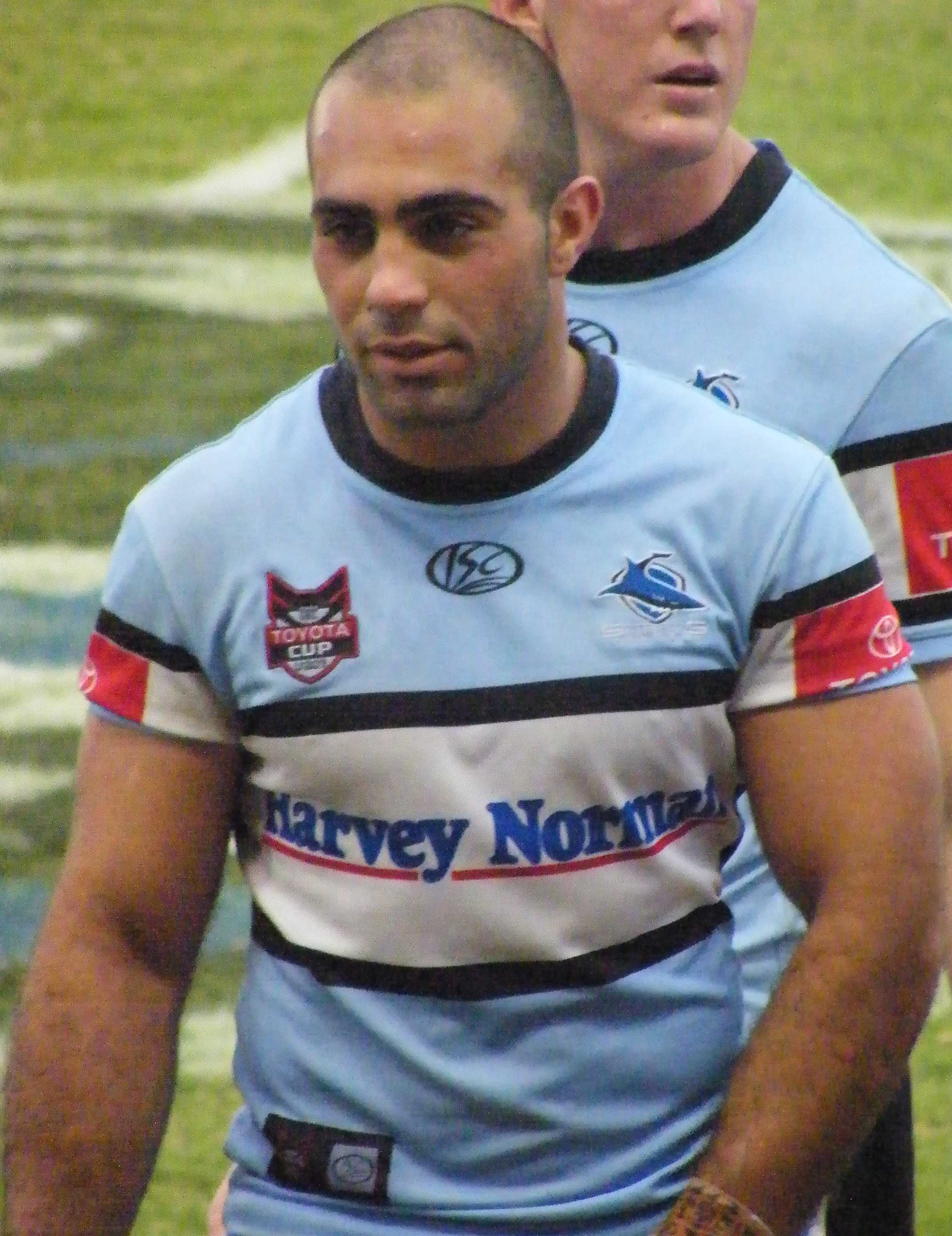

Personal information
- Full name: Lancen Joudo
- Born: 2 January 1989 (age 37) Urunga, New South Wales, Australia
- Height: 180 cm (5 ft 11 in)
- Weight: 89 kg (14 st 0 lb)

Playing information
- Position: Hooker
Club
Years	Team	Pld	T	G	FG	P
2009–10	Cronulla-Sutherland	3	0	0	0	0
- Source: As of 21 January 2019

Lancen Joudo is an Australian former professional rugby league footballer who was last contracted to the North Queensland Cowboys in the National Rugby League. He was by preference a hooker but can also play at Five-eighth.

== Early life ==
During his junior and youth career, he played for the St Clair Comets and won representative honours with New South Wales Under 17's, and Australia Under 15's. He also previously played as a junior for the Penrith Panthers.

== Playing career ==
Joudo made his first grade début in the 2009 NRL season in a round 23 56–10 defeat at home to Wests Tigers, where he came on off the bench. He again started on the bench in his second appearance of the season, in a 20–10 away loss to the Gold Coast Titans.
