= Luke Harlen =

Australian rugby league footballer (born 1984)

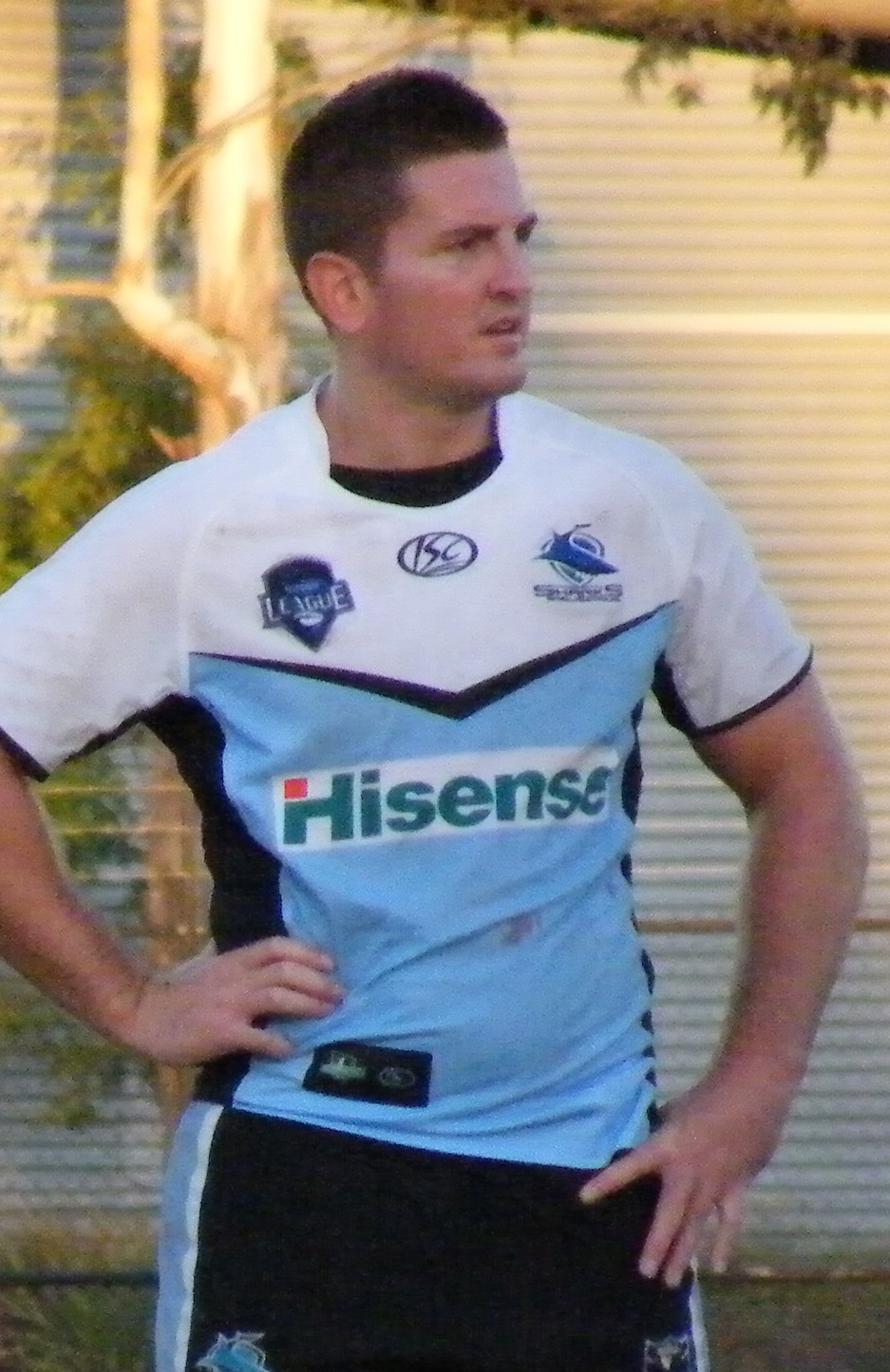

Personal information
- Born: 28 April 1984 (age 42) Townsville, Queensland, Australia
- Height: 189 cm (6 ft 2 in)
- Weight: 99 kg (15 st 8 lb)

Playing information
- Position: Prop, Second-row
Club
Years	Team	Pld	T	G	FG	P
2006	Cronulla Sharks	2	0	0	0	0
2008	North Qld Cowboys	5	0	0	0	0
2010	Cronulla Sharks	3	0	0	0	0
	Total	10	0	0	0	0
Representative
Years	Team	Pld	T	G	FG	P
2011	Queensland Residents	1	0	0	0	0
- Source: As of 5 January 2024

Luke Harlen (born 28 April 1984) is an Australian former professional rugby league footballer. He previously played for the Cronulla-Sutherland Sharks, North Queensland Cowboys and the Wests Tigers in the National Rugby League. He played as a prop-forward.

== Background ==
Harlen was born in Townsville, Queensland, Australia.

== Career ==
Harlen made his debut for the Cronulla-Sutherland Sharks in 2006.

Although contracted to the Wests Tigers for the 2008 season he did not play in the first-grade team. Harlen was released mid-season to play for the Northern Pride in the Queensland Cup competition.

He made his debut for the North Queensland Cowboys against the Brisbane Broncos in Round 19, 2008 after being called up from the Northern Pride in the Queensland Cup competition. He returned to the Cronulla-Sutherland Sharks in 2010 and played a further three more NRL Games.

After being unsigned by the Cronulla outfit in 2010, Harlen returned to the Queensland Cup with the Northern Pride. Harlen represented the QLD residents side in 2011 after strong performances with the Northern Pride. In 2012, North Queensland signed the front rower on a one-year deal. Harlen retired midway through the 2012 season due to an ongoing knee injury.

== Career highlights ==
- First Grade Debut: 2006 – Round 3, Cronulla vs Manly-Warringah Sea Eagles at Brookvale Oval, 25 March
