= Will Tupou =

Japan international rugby union & league footballer

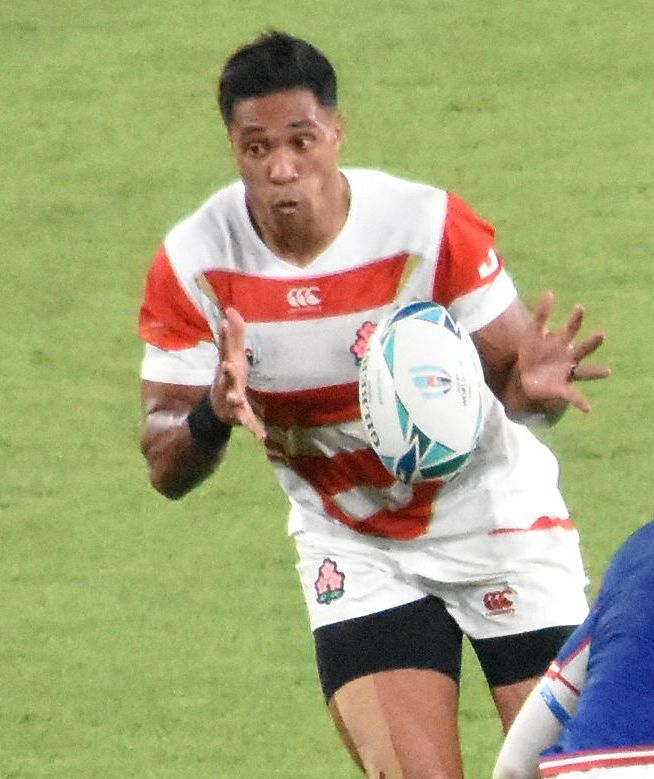
- Tupou in 2019

Personal information
- Born: 20 July 1990 (age 35) Auckland, New Zealand
- Height: 187 cm (6 ft 2 in)
- Weight: 101 kg (15 st 13 lb)

Playing information

Rugby league
- Position: Centre, Wing
Club
Years	Team	Pld	T	G	FG	P
2010–11	North Qld Cowboys	21	8	0	0	32

Rugby union
- Position: Centre, Fullback, Flanker, Number eight
Club
Years	Team	Pld	T	G	FG	P
2012–13	Western Force	13	1	0	0	5
2014–16	Hino Motors Red Dolphins	15	7	0	0	35
2016–21	Coca-Cola Red Sparks	34	65	0	0	60
2017–18	Sunwolves	14	4	1	0	24
2021-	Toyota Verblitz	50	8	0	0	40
	Total	126	85	1	0	164
Representative
Years	Team	Pld	T	G	FG	P
2017–	Japan	12	1	0	0	5
- Source: As of 2 August 2021

Will Tupou (born 20 July 1990) is a New Zealand rugby union footballer who plays for the Toyota Verblitz in the Japan Rugby League One competition. He previously played rugby league for the North Queensland Cowboys in the NRL. He represents Japan at international level, having satisfied residency requirements.

== Background ==
Tupou was born in Auckland, New Zealand. His brother is professional rugby union player Semisi Tupou.

== Early days ==
A Brisbane Souths junior, Tupou began his career with the Brisbane Broncos in the Toyota Cup before switching to the North Queensland Cowboys for the 2010 NRL season. After playing three strong performances in the Toyota Cup. He attended Brisbane State High School during his senior years.

== Career ==
In round 4 of the National Rugby League 2010 he made his debut for the North Queensland Cowboys. On 24 July 2010 he scored a magnificent try to win the cowboys game over the Newcastle Knights in extra time.

Tupou joined the Western Force for the Super Rugby 2012 season.
