= 2018 Northern Pride RLFC season =

Australian rugby league club season

Coordinates: 16°55′49″S 145°46′2″E

Northern Pride
Club information
- Full name: Northern Pride Rugby League Football Club
- Nickname: The Pride
- Colours: Black, teal and gold
- Founded: 2007
- Website: northernpride.com.au

Current details
- Ground: Barlow Park, Cairns (seating 1,700, standing 15,000)
- CEO: Greg Dowling (2017-2018)
- Coach: Ty Williams (2017-2023)
- Captain: Ryan Ghietti (2016–2018)
- Competition: Intrust Super Cup
- 2018: 4th
- Home colours

Records
- Premierships: 2 (2010, 2014)
- Runners-up: 1 (2009)
- Minor premierships: 3 (2013, 2014, 2024)

2018 was the eleventh competitive season for the Cairns based Northern Pride Rugby League Football Club. They were one of 14 clubs that played in the twenty-second season of Queensland's top rugby league competition, QRL's Intrust Super Cup, with each team playing 12 home games and 11 away games over 24 weeks between March and August.

Channel 9 continued to be the television broadcast provider, but televised games moved from 2:00pm Sunday to 1:00pm on Saturday afternoon.

The Pride signed Dally M medal winner Todd Carney, a huge coup for the club. Carney hoped to join the Cowboys and play in the NRL again. After eight rounds, Carney resigned to move to Sydney to look after a family member, but promptly signed with Intrust Super Premiership side, North Sydney Bears. The Pride requested $15,000 in compensation to cover relocation costs they had paid, but Carney and the Bears refused. Carney then signed a short-term contract with Hull Kingston Rovers and returned to England to play Super League.

This was Ty Williams second season as coach. The Pride had a promising start, with three consecutive wins, but then had three straight losses, setting the tone for a turbulent season marked by inconsistent performances. The Pride won 13 games and finished fourth. They were knocked out of the finals series in the first week, with a resounding defeat to Easts Tigers 32-0. The Tigers were beaten in the Grand Final by minor-premiers Redcliffe Dolphins.

== 2018 Season - Northern Pride ==
- Competition: Intrust Super Cup.
- Sponsor: The Pride started the season with no major sponsor, after Sea Swift's sponsorship ended. Part way through the season 'Mount Peter Estate' signed as the Pride's major sponsor.

=== Staff ===
==== Coaches/Trainers ====
- Coach: Ty Williams
- Assistant coach: Ben Rauter
- Hastings Deering Colts U-20s coach: Dave Scott
- Mal Meninga Cup U-18s coach: Tye Ingebrigtsen
- Strength and conditioning coach: Scott Callaghan

==== Captain ====
- Ryan Ghietti

==== Managers ====
- Football Operations Manager: Chey Bird
- Administration Manager: Lauren Dowling
- Chief executive: Greg Dowling
- Chairman: Tony Williamson
- Board of Directors: Colin Moore (CDRL), Ian Lydiard (CDJRL), Peter Parr (Cowboys), Gail Andrejic (finance), Stephen Tillett, Stephen Devenish.

== Squad ==
The Pride used 32 players this season. Seventeen players from last year signed with the club again, three of the Cowboys allocation players from last year were assigned to the Pride again this year, and allocation player Ethan Lowe* returned to the Pride after last season's absence. Nine new players made their debut this season; four were new signings (Jack Murphy, James Clark, Jonico Hardwick and Todd Carney), and five were new Cowboys allocation players (Emry Pere*, Enari Tuala*, Jake Clifford*, Murray Taulagi* and Peter Hola**). Dave Murphy and Brett Anderson re-signed with the Pride.

Ryan Ghietti (c) – HK
Aidan Day – PR
Bradley Stephen – WG
Brett Anderson – CE
Colin Wilkie – SR, LK
Connor Jones – PR
Darryn Schonig – HK
David Murphy – PR
Graham Clark – LK
Jack Campagnolo
Jack Murphy – FB
James Clark – SR

Jonico Hardwick – WG
Jordan Biondi-Odo – FE
Justin Castellaro – CE
Matthew Musumeci – FB
Nathan Wales – SR
Shawn Bowen – WG
Sheldon Powe-Hobbs – LK, SR
Todd Carney – CE
Tom Hancock – SR
Troy Kapea – WG
Will Bugden – SR

Trial

Adrian Henley
Ben Cocciolone
Dale Ambrym
Dan Moevao
George House
Isaac Pedersen
Keelan White
Lachlan Parmenter
Lata Fakalelu
Mat Laumea
Milton Mossman
Willem Foster

North Queensland Cowboys allocation

Ben Hampton* – FB, CE
Emry Pere* – PR
Enari Tuala* – WG, CE
Ethan Lowe* – SR
Gideon Gela-Mosby* – FB, WG
Jake Clifford* – HB, FE
Javid Bowen* – CE, WG
Murray Taulagi* – CE, WG
Peter Hola* – LK

Allocated but did not play for the Pride in 2018:
Coen Hess – PR
Connor Luhan
Scott Bolton – PR, SR
Wiremu Greig

=== 2018 player gains ===
Player	From League	From Club
Todd Carney	English RFL Super League	Salford Red Devils
Jack Murphy	English RFL Championship	Swinton Lions
Jamie Clark	NRL Telstra Premiership	Canterbury-Bankstown Bulldogs
Adrian Henley	Intrust Super Cup	Easts Tigers
David Murphy	Intrust Super Cup	Easts Tigers
Jonico Hardwick	CDRL	Brothers Cairns
Brett Anderson	CDRL	Innisfail Leprechauns
Jack Campagnolo	CDRL	Tully Tigers

=== Player losses after 2017 season ===
Player	To League	To Club
Jack Brock	Intrust Super Cup	Mackay Cutters
Brad Lupi	Intrust Super Cup	Central Capras
Luke George	Intrust Super Cup	Central Capras
Khan Ahwang	Intrust Super Cup	Sunshine Coast Falcons
Joel Riethmuller	Retired	
Fred Koraba	Released	
Ben Reuter	Released	
Marvin Toko	Released	

==== Cowboys no longer allocated to the Pride ====
Player	To League	To Club
Ben Spina*	TDRL	Herbert River Crushers
Marcus Jensen*		
Patrick Mago*	NRL Telstra Premiership	Brisbane Broncos

=== 2018 season launch ===
- Pre-season training: 6 November 2017
- Season launch: 3 March 2018, Cairns Colonial Club, 1:00pm to 6:00pm.

=== 2018 QRL awards ===
- QRL Coach of the Year: Ty Williams
- QRL Pedro Gallagher Award for Rookie of the Year: Jake Clifford* (presented by the Carbine Club).

=== 2018 player awards ===
26 August 2018, Brothers World of Entertainment, Manunda

- Northern Pride Player of the Year: Brett Anderson
- Most improved player: Jordan Biondi-Odo
- Best Back: Brett Anderson
- Best Forward: Darryn Schonig
- Rookie of the Year: Jack Campagnolo
- John O'Brien Perpetual Club Person of the Year: Murray Stalley and Max Conroy

==== 2018 Player records ====
- Most Games: Ryan Ghietti (24), Brett Anderson (24), Graham Clark (24).
- Most Tries: Jake Clifford* (10), Gideon Gela-Mosby* (10).
- Most Points: Jake Clifford* (134 points). Clifford was the 4th highest point scorer in the QRL this season with 10 tries, 46 goals and 3 field-goals.

==== Sponsors ====
- Shirt sponsors: Rivers Insurance Brokers, Remax Real Estate, Brothers Leagues Club.
- Sleeve sponsores: EMU Sportswear, CSF Industries, Century Cranes.
- Shorts sponsors: The Pier Bar, North Queensland Cowboys, Intrust Super.
- Broadcast partner: Channel 7 Cairns

=== Jerseys ===
2018 Jersey

=== Trial matches ===
Round	Opponent	Score	Date	Venue
Trial 1	Mackay Cutters	22 – 28	Saturday, 10 February 2018	Townsville Sports Reserve, Townsville
Trial 2	Cairns Connection	40 – 10	Saturday, 17 February 2018	Barlow Park, Cairns
Trial 3	Townsville Blackhawks	CANCELLED	Saturday 24 February 2018	Jack Manski Oval, Townsville
Trial 4	Northern Pride	In House	Tuesday 27 February 2018	Barlow Park, Cairns

Pre-season Trial 1
Saturday
10 February 2018
19:00 AEST (UTC+10)

Northern Pride	22 – 28	Mackay Cutters
Tries ? Goals ?		Tries ? Goals ?

Townsville Sports Reserve
(Warburton Street, Townsville, QLD)

Northern Pride: 1. Jack Murphy – FB 2. Shawn Bowen – WG 3. Todd Carney – CE 4. Brett Anderson – CE 5. Troy Kapea – WG 6. Bradley Stephen – FE 7. Matthew Musumeci – HB 8. Mat Lameau – PR 9. Lata Fakalelu – HK 10. Connor Jones – PR 11. Will Bugden – SR 12. Darryn Schonig – SR 13. Tom Hancock – LK
Unlimited Interchange: 14. Jordan Biondi-Odo, 15. Nathan Wales, 16. Ryan Ghietti (c) 17. James Clark, 18. Jonico Hardwick, 19. Dave Murphy, 20. Jack Campagnolo.
Mackay Cutters: ?

Pre-season Trial 2
Saturday
17 February 2018
17:30 AEST (UTC+10)

Northern Pride	40 – 10	Cairns Connection
Tries: Justin Castellaro 3 Dale Ambrym 1 Willem Foster 1 Nathan Wales 1 George House 1 Goals: Jack Campagnolo 6 (6 from 6)	Half-time: 36 – 0	Tries: 2 Peter Tuccandidgee Goals: 1 A. Garrett.

Barlow Park
(Severin Street, Parramatta Park, QLD)
Attendance: 9.000+

Northern Pride: 1. Jared Allen – FB 2. Jonico Hardwick – WG 3. Justin Castellaro – CE 4. Dale Ambrym – CE 5. Willem Foster – WG 6. George House – FE 7. Jack Campagnolo – HB 8. Mat Laumea – PR 9. Connor Jones – HK 10. Ben Cocciolone – PR 11. Nathan Wales – SR 12. James Clark – SR 13. Graham Clark – LK
Unlimited Interchange: 14. Milton Mossman, 15. Lata Fakalelu, 16. Aidan Day, 17. Dan Moevao, 18. Darryn Schonig, 19. Colin Wilkie, 20. Matthew Musumeci.
Unavailable: Todd Carney.
Cairns Connection: 1. A. Jolley, 2. Peter Tuccandidgee, 3. B. Broski Emery-Hunia, 4. V. Law, 5. J. Hogan, 6. E. Morrison-Sailor, 7. A. Garrett, 8. D. Sagigi, 9. N. Blackman, 10. N. Serafino, 11. Fred Koraba (c), 12. A. Daniel, 13. S. Cliff.
Interchange: 14. J. Willis, 15. C. Child, 16. M. Lee, 17. B. Power, 18. R. Pedersen, 19. T. Harrison, 20. D. Mata-Rakene.
Coach: Leon Hallie.
- Note: This trail game was played as the curtain raiser to the NRL pre-season trial match between the North Queensland Cowboys and Wests Tigers. Kick-off for the NRL Trial was delayed by a widespread power outage.

Pre-season Trial 3
Saturday
24 February 2018

Townsville Blackhawks	CANCELLED	Northern Pride

Jack Manski Oval
(Golf Links Drive, Kirwan, QLD)

Northern Pride: 1. Jack Murphy – FB 2. Bradley Stephen – WG 3. Javid Bowen* – CE 4. Justin Castellaro – CE 5. Brett Anderson – WG 6. Todd Carney – FE 7. Jake Clifford* – HB 8. Will Bugden – PR 9. Darryn Schonig – HK 10. Ryan Ghietti (c) – PR 11. – SR 12. Graeme Clark – SR 13. Tom Hancock – LK
Interchange: 14. David Murphy, 15. Troy Kapea, 16. Emry Pere*, 17. ?
Townsville and District Mendi Blackhawks: ?
- Note: This trail game was cancelled due to heavy rain and a flooded pitch.

Pre-season Trial 4
Tuesday
27 February 2018
19:00 AEST (UTC+10)

Northern Pride A	v	Northern Pride B
Tries ? Goals ?		Tries ? Goals ?

Barlow Park
(Severin Street, Parramatta Park, QLD)

Northern Pride: Full squad split into two teams.
Unavailable: Ryan Ghietti (flu).
- Note: Because the trial game against the Blackhawks was cancelled last weekend, coach Ty Williams organised an in-house scratch match between the full squad. he game This was Todd Carney's first game, and it was played behind closed door, no spectators, no media allowed at the ground.

=== Intrust Super Cup matches ===
ROUND 1: Intrust Super Cup 2018

Saturday
10 March 2018
18:30 AEST (UTC+10)

Northern Pride	12 – 24	Wynnum Manly Seagulls
Tries: Jake Clifford* 2 Goals: Todd Carney 2 (2 from 4)	Half-time: 8 – 6 Penalties: 8 – 8 QRL Report	Tries: 1 Michael Dobson; 1 Max Elliott; 1 Mitchell Frei; 1 Daniel Ogden; Goals: 4 Shaun Nona (4 from 4)

Totally Workwear Stadium
(Stones Corner, Brisbane, QLD)
Referee: Jarrod Cole

Mount Peter Estate Northern Pride: 1. Jack Murphy – FB 2. Murray Taulagi* – WG 3. Brett Anderson – CE 4. Enari Tuala* – CE 5. Justin Castellaro – WG 6. Todd Carney – FE 7. Jake Clifford* – HB 8. Will Bugden – PR 9. Ryan Ghietti (c) – HK 10. Darryn Schonig – PR 11. Tom Hancock – SR 12. Nathan Wales – SR 13. Graham Clark – LK
Interchange: 14. David Murphy, 15. Colin Wilkie, 16. Emry Pere*, 17. Troy Kapea.
* = Cowboys allocation (4 players allocated for this match).
Unavailable:
Wynnum-Manly Seagulls: 1. Pat Templeman, 2. Peter Gubb, 3. Jeriah Goodrich, 4. Delouise Hoeter, 5. Daniel Ogden, 6. Shaun Nona, 7. Michael Dobson, 8. Ngarima Pita, 14. Jayden Berrell, 10. Max Elliott, 11. Alex Barr, 12. Atelea Vea, 13. Mitchell Frei
Interchange: 9. Mitchell Moore, 15. Patrick Carrigan, 16. Keenan Palasia, 17. Payne Haas.
* = Brisbane Broncos allocation (? players allocated for this match).
Coach: Adam Brideson.
- Note: Torrential Wet season rain flooded Barlow Park, and so on Friday morning the decision was made to play the game at Easts Tigers home ground in Brisbane. The Pride were expecting a crowd of around 4,000 people to see Todd Carney's return to rugby league in Australia.
  This was the Pride debut for Jack Murphy and Todd Carney (Pride Players 144 & 147) and North Queensland Cowboys allocation players Murray Taulagi*, Enari Tuala*, Jake Clifford* and Emry Pere* (Pride Players 145, 146, 148 & 149).

Position	Round 1 – 2018	P	W	D	L	B	For	Against	Diff	Pts
13	Northern Pride	1	0	0	1	0	12	24	-12	0

ROUND 2: Intrust Super Cup 2018

Saturday
17 March 2018
18:00 AEST (UTC+10)

Northern Pride	26 – 14	Papua New Guinea Hunters
Tries: Shawn Bowen 1 Murray Taulagi* 2 Nathan Wales 1 Goals: Jake Clifford* 5 (5 from 6)	Half-time: 14 – 0 Penalties: 7 – 4 QRL Report	Tries: 1 Ase Boas; 1 Butler Morris; 1 Charlie Simon; Goals: 1Ase Boas (1 from 3)

Barlow Park
(Severin Street, Parramatta Park, QLD)
Referee: Chris Anderson

Mount Peter Estate Northern Pride: 1. Jack Murphy – FB 2. Murray Taulagi* – WG 3. Brett Anderson – CE 4. Enari Tuala* – CE 5. Justin Castellaro – WG 6. Todd Carney – FE 7. Jake Clifford* – HB 8. Will Bugden – PR 9. Ryan Ghietti (c) – HK 10. Darryn Schonig – PR 11. Tom Hancock – SR 12. Nathan Wales – SR 13. Graham Clark – LK
Interchange: 14. David Murphy, 15. Colin Wilkie, 16. Emry Pere*, 17. Troy Kapea.
* = Cowboys allocation (4 players allocated for this match).
Pride Out: Justin Castellaro (wing), Todd Carney injured (five-eighth), David Murphy (bench), Colin Wilkie (bench).
Pride In: Shawn Bowen (wing), Jordan Biondi-Odo (five-eighth), Connor Jones (bench), Aidan Day (bench).
SP PNG Hunters: 1. Adex Wera, 2. Paul Wawa, 3. Nixon Putt, 4. Willie Minoga, 5. Butler Morris, 6. Ase Boas, 7. Watson Boas, 8. Moses Meninga, 9. Wartovo Puara, 10. Mckenzie Yei, 11. Rhadley Brawa, 12. John Andy, 13. Adam Korave.
Interchange: 14. Charlie Simon, 15. Ila Alu, 17. Dilbert Issac, 18. Stargroth Amean.
Coach: Stanley Tepend.
- Note: The Hunters were last year's premiers.
  Colin Wilkie retired after this round.
  This was the Pride debut for North Queensland Cowboys allocation player Peter Hola* (Pride Player 152).

Position	Round 2 – 2018	P	W	D	L	B	For	Against	Diff	Pts
7	Northern Pride	2	1	0	1	0	38	38	0	2

ROUND 3: Intrust Super Cup 2018

Saturday
24 March, 2018
18:00 AEST (UTC+10)

Townsville Blackhawks	6 – 26	Northern Pride
Tries: Jaelen Feeney 1 Goals: Carlin Anderson 1 (1 from 1)	Half-time: 6 – 12; Penalties: 11 – 11; QRL Report	Tries: 2 Jake Clifford*; 1 Darryn Schonig; 1 Murray Taulagi*; Goals: 5 Jake Clifford* (5 from 5)

Jack Manski Oval
(Golf Links Drive, Kirwan, QLD)
Referee: Nick Pelgrave, Chris Anderson

Mount Peter Estate Northern Pride: 1. Jack Murphy – FB 2. Murray Taulagi* – WG 3. Brett Anderson – CE 4. Enari Tuala* – CE 5. Shawn Bowen – WG 6. Todd Carney – FE 7. Jake Clifford* – HB 8. Will Bugden – PR 9. Ryan Ghietti (c) – HK 10. Darryn Schonig – PR 11. Tom Hancock – SR 12. Nathan Wales – SR 13. Graham Clark – LK
Interchange: 14. Connor Jones, 15. David Murphy, 16. Emry Pere*, 17. Troy Kapea.
* = Cowboys allocation (4 players allocated for this match).
Pride Out: Jordan Biondi-Odo (five-eighth), Aidan Day (bench).
Pride In: Todd Carney (five-eighth), David Murphy (bench).
Townsville and District Mendi Blackhawks: 1. Carlin Anderson, 2. Jonathon Reuben, 3. Shaun Hudson, 4. Kalifa Faifai Loa, 5. Michael Carroll, 6. Jaelen Feeney, 7. Zach Dockar-Clay, 8. Francis Molo, 9. Krys Freeman, 10. Corey Jensen, 11. Jake Marketo, 12. Andrew Niemoeller (c), 13. Joe Boyce.
Interchange: 14. Rod Griffin, 17. Temone Power, 19. Brent Woolf, 22. Sione Lousi.
* = North Queensland Cowboys allocation (? players allocated for this match).
Coach: Kristian Woolf.

Position	Round 3 – 2018	P	W	D	L	B	For	Against	Diff	Pts
3	Northern Pride	3	2	0	1	0	64	44	+20	4

ROUND 4: Intrust Super Cup 2018

Saturday
31 March 2018
18:00 AEST (UTC+10)

Northern Pride	22 – 16	Mackay Cutters
Tries: Jake Clifford* 2 Brett Anderson 1 Shawn Bowen 1 Goals: Jake Clifford* 2 (2 from 4); Penalty Goal: Jake Clifford* 1	Half-time: 16 – 4 Penalties: 10 – 9 QRL Report	Tries: 2 Yamba Bowie; 1 Lachlan Coote; 1 Jayden Hodges; Goals: (0 from 4) Lachlan Coote; Penalty Goal: (0 from 1) Kyle Laybutt

Barlow Park
(Severin Street, Parramatta Park, QLD)
Referee: Tim Rutherford

Mount Peter Estate Northern Pride: 1. Jack Murphy – FB 2. Murray Taulagi* – WG 3. Brett Anderson – CE 4. Enari Tuala* – CE 5. Shawn Bowen – WG 6. Todd Carney – FE 7. Jake Clifford* – HB 8. Will Bugden – PR 9. Ryan Ghietti (c) – HK 10. Darryn Schonig – PR 11. Tom Hancock – SR 12. Nathan Wales – SR 13. Graham Clark – LK
Interchange: 14. Connor Jones, 15. David Murphy, 16. Emry Pere*, 17. Troy Kapea.
* = Cowboys allocation (4 players allocated for this match).
Mackay Cutters: 1. Lachlan Coote, 2. Yamba Bowie, 3. Nathan Saumalu, 4. Blake Atherton, 5. Johnny Faletagoa'I, 6. Nicho Hynes, 7. Kyle Laybutt, 8. Samuel Hoare (c), 9. Josh Chudleigh, 10. Nick Brown, 11. Mitchell Dunn, 12. Tyson Martin, 13. Bennett Leslie.
Interchange: 14. Jayden Hodges, 15. Kell Jenner, 16. Darcy Cox, 17. Jordan Grant.
* = North Queensland Cowboys allocation (? players allocated for this match).
Coach: Steve Sheppard.

Position	Round 4 – 2018	P	W	D	L	B	For	Against	Diff	Pts
2	Northern Pride	4	3	0	1	0	86	60	+26	6

ROUND 5: Intrust Super Cup 2018

Saturday
7 April 2018
15:00 AEST (UTC+10)

Ipswich Jets	16 – 12	Northern Pride
Tries: Michael Purcell 1 Pio Seci 1 Nat Neale 1 Goals: Wes Conlon 1 (1 from 3); Penalty Goal: Wes Conlon 1	Half-time: 2 – 12; Penalties: 8 – 8 QRL Report	Tries: 1 Will Bugden; 1 Shawn Bowen Goals: 2 Jake Clifford* (2 from 2); Penalty Goal: 0

North Ipswich Reserve
(Ipswich, QLD)
Referee: Tim Rutherford.

Mount Peter Estate Northern Pride: 1. Jordan Biondi-Odo – FB 2. Murray Taulagi* – WG 3. Brett Anderson – CE 4. Enari Tuala* – CE 5. Shawn Bowen – WG 6. Todd Carney – FE 7. Jake Clifford* – HB 8. David Murphy – PR 9. Ryan Ghietti (c) – HK 10. Will Bugden – PR 11. Tom Hancock – SR 12. Nathan Wales – SR 13. Graham Clark – LK
Interchange: 14. Darryn Schonig, 15. Connor Jones, 16. Emry Pere*, 17. Troy Kapea.
* = Cowboys allocation (4 players allocated for this match).
Pride Out: Jack Murphy (fullback).
Pride In: Jordan Biondi-Odo (fullback)
Changes: Darryn Schonig (front row to bench), David Murphy (bench to front row)
'Ipswich Jets: 1. Michael Purcell, 14. Denzel Burns, 3. Pio Seci, 17. Rory Humphreys, 5. Wes Conlon, 6. Julian Christian, 7. Dane Phillips, 8. Tyson Lofipo, 21. Kierran Moseley, 10. Nathaniel Neale (c), 11. Ben White, 12. Sebastian Pandia, 13. Ben Shea
Interchange: 4. Samuel Caslick, 9. Jayden Connors, 15. Fakahoko Teutau, 16. Rowan Winterfield
* = Brisbane Broncos allocation (? players allocated for this match).
Coach: Ben Walker & Shane Walker

Position	Round 5 – 2018	P	W	D	L	B	For	Against	Diff	Pts
5	Northern Pride	5	3	0	2	0	98	76	+22	6

ROUND 6: Intrust Super Cup 2018

Saturday
14 April 2018
13:10 AEST (UTC+10)

Northern Pride	4 – 14	Easts Tigers
Tries: Justin Castellaro 1 Goals: Jake Clifford* 0 (0 from 1)	Half-time: 4 – 10; Penalties: 6 – 5 QRL Report	Tries: Joe Bond 1 Conor Carey 1 Kea Pere 1 Goals: 1 Brayden Torpy (1 from 3)

Barlow Park
(Severin Street, Parramatta Park, QLD)
Referee: Ben Watts, Tyson Brough

Mount Peter Estate Northern Pride: 1. Gideon Gela-Mosby* – FB 2. Murray Taulagi* – WG 3. Brett Anderson – CE 4. Javid Bowen* – CE 5. Justin Castellaro – WG 6. Todd Carney – FE 7. Jake Clifford* – HB 8. Darryn Schonig – PR 9. Ryan Ghietti (c) – HK 10. Will Bugden – PR 11. Tom Hancock – SR 12. Graham Clark – SR 13. Troy Kapea – LK
Interchange: 14. David Murphy, 15. Jordan Biondi-Odo, 16. Emry Pere*, 17. Aidan Day.
* = Cowboys allocation (5 players allocated for this match).
Pride Out: Enari Tuala* (centre), Shawn Bowen (wing), Nathan Wales (second row), Connor Jones (bench)
Pride In: Gideon Gela-Mosby* (fullback), Javid Bowen* (centre), Justin Castellaro (wing), Aidan Day (bench)
Changes: Jordan Biondi-Odo (fullback to bench), David Murphy (front row to bench), Graham Clark (lock to second row), Darryn Schonig (bench to front row), Troy Kapea (bench to lock).
Eastern Suburbs Tigers: 1. Joe Bond, 2. Linc Port, 3. Kea Pere, 4. Conor Carey, 5. Jarrod Mcinally, 6. Brayden Torpy, 7. Brodie Croft, 8. Ash Little, 9. Chris Ostwald, 10. Patrick Kaufusi, 11. Jake Foster (c), 12. Brett Greinke, 13. Jack Svendsen
Interchange: 14. Jarred Tuite, 15. Anton Iaria, 16. Adam Crear, 17. Harley Aiono.
* = Melbourne Storm allocation (? players allocated for this match).
Coach: Scott SIpple.
- Note: This game was shown live on Channel 9

Position	Round 6 – 2018	P	W	D	L	B	For	Against	Diff	Pts
7	Northern Pride	6	3	0	3	0	102	90	+12	6

ROUND 7: Intrust Super Cup 2018

Saturday
21 April 2018
19:30 AEST (UTC+10)

CQ Capras	15 – 8	Northern Pride
Tries: Maipele Morseu 1 Dave Taylor 1 Goals: Connor Broadhurst 2 (2 from 2); Penalty Goal; Connor Broadhurst (1 from 1) 1	Half-time: 6 – 0 Penalties: 12 – 10; QRL Report	Tries: 1 Jake Clifford* Goals: 1 Jake Clifford* (1 from 1); Penalty Goal; 1 Jake Clifford* (1 from 1)

Alan McIndoe Park
(Emerald, QLD)
Attendance: 3,000
Referee: Tim Rutherford

Mount Peter Estate Northern Pride: 1. Gideon Gela-Mosby* – FB 2. Murray Taulagi* – WG 3. Brett Anderson – CE 4. Javid Bowen* – CE 5. Enari Tuala* – WG 6. Todd Carney – FE 7. Jake Clifford* – HB 8. Will Bugden – PR 9. Ryan Ghietti (c) – HK 10. David Murphy – PR 11. Tom Hancock – SR 12. James Clark – SR 13. Graham Clark – LK
Interchange: 14. Jordan Biondi-Odo, 15. Darryn Schonig, 16. Troy Kapea, 17. Emry Pere*.
* = Cowboys allocation (6 players allocated for this match).
Unavailable: Gideon Gela-Mosby* (suspended).
Pride Out: Justin Castellaro (wing), Aidan Day (bench).
Pride In: Enari Tuala* (wing), James Clark (second row).
Changes: Darryn Schonig (front row to bench), Graham Clark (second row to lock), Troy Kapea (lock to bench), David Murphy (bench to front row)
Central Queensland Capras: 1. Zeik Foster, 2. Junior Kirisome, 3. Connor Broadhurst, 4. Nathan Bassani, 5. Chanel Seigafo, 17. Maipele Morseu, 7. Blake Goodman, 6. Jerry Key (c), 9. Aaron Teroi, 10. Oliver Percy, 11. David Cowhan, 8. Bill Cullen, 13. Jamie Hill.
Interchange: 12. Dave Taylor, 14. Darcy Davey, 15. Brad Lupi, 16. Phill Nati.
The Capras did not have a NRL team affiliation.
Coach: Kim Williams.
- Note: This was the Pride debut for James Clark (Pride Player 150).

Position	Round 7 – 2018	P	W	D	L	B	For	Against	Diff	Pts
8	Northern Pride	7	3	0	4	0	110	105	+5	6

ROUND 8: Intrust Super Cup 2018

Saturday
28 April 2018
18:00 AEST (UTC+10)

Northern Pride	28 – 24	Sunshine Coast Falcons
Tries: Murray Taulagi* 1 Todd Carney 1 Jake Clifford* 1 Enari Tuala* 1 David Murphy 1 Goals: Jake Clifford* 3 (3 from 5)' Penalty Goals: Jake Clifford* 1 (1 from 1)	Half-time: 10 – 12; Penalties: 8 – 6 QRL Report	Tries: 1 Jake Ainsworth; 1 Harry Grant; 1 Matt Soper-Lawler; 1 Justin Olam Goals: 2 Cooper Johns (2 from 3); 1 Matt Soper-Lawler (1 from 1); Penalty Goals: 2 Cooper Johns (2 from 2)

Barlow Park
(Severin Street, Parramatta Park, QLD)
Referee: Liam Kennedy

Mount Peter Estate Northern Pride: 1. Jordan Biondi-Odo – FB 2. Murray Taulagi* – WG 3. Brett Anderson – CE 4. Javid Bowen* – CE 5. Enari Tuala* – WG 6. Todd Carney – FE 7. Jake Clifford* – HB 8. Will Bugden – PR 9. Ryan Ghietti (c) – HK 10. David Murphy – PR 11. Tom Hancock – SR 12. James Clark – SR 13. Graham Clark – LK
Interchange: 14. Jack Murphy, 15. Sheldon Powe-Hobbs, 16. Troy Kapea, 17. Emry Pere*.
* = Cowboys allocation (5 players allocated for this match).
Pride Out: Gideon Gela-Mosby* (fullback),Darryn Schonig (bench)
Pride In: Jack Murphy (bench), Sheldon Powe-Hobbs (bench)
Changes: Jordan Biondi-Odo (bench to fullback)
Sunshine Coast Falcons: 1. Jahrome Hughes, 2. Matt Soper-Lawler, 3. Justin Olam, 4. Jye Ballinger, 5. Jake Ainsworth, 6. Cooper Johns, 7. Rhys Jacks, 18. Tui Kamikamica, 9. Harry Grant, 10. Lachlan Timm, 11. Dane Hogan (c), 12. Chris Lewis, 15. Liam Mcdonald.
Interchange: 13. Louis Geraghty, 14. Jacob Hind, 16. Brentt Warr, 17. Lachlan Roe.
* = Melbourne Storm allocation (? players allocated for this match).
Coach: Craig Ingebrigtsen
- Note: Todd Carney scored his first try for the Pride, then decided to resign and move to Sydney.

Position	Round 8 – 2018	P	W	D	L	B	For	Against	Diff	Pts
7	Northern Pride	8	4	0	4	0	138	129	+9	8

ROUND 9: Intrust Super Cup 2018

5–6 May 2018

Northern Pride	BYE

Position	Round 9 – 2018	P	W	D	L	B	For	Against	Diff	Pts
7	Northern Pride	8	4	0	4	1	138	129	+9	10

ROUND 10: Intrust Super Cup 2018

Saturday
12 May 2018
13:10 AEST (UTC+10)

Redcliffe Dolphins	24 – 26	Northern Pride
Tries: Kotoni Staggs 1 Scott Schulte 1 Jeremy Hawkins 1 Jamil Hopoate 1 Jonus Pearson 1 Goals: Kotoni Staggs 2 (2 from 5)	Half-time: 4 – 18; Penalties: 4 – 9 Sin Bin: Kotoni Staggs ----- QRL Report	Tries: 3 Enari Tuala*; 1 David Murphy; 1 Emry Pere*; 1 Brett Anderson Goals: 1 Jake Clifford* (1 from 6)

Moreton Daily Stadium
(Klingner Road, Redcliffe, QLD)
Referee: Michael Gordon, Tyson Brough

Mount Peter Estate Northern Pride: 1. Jack Murphy – FB 2. Murray Taulagi* – WG 3. Brett Anderson – CE 4. Javid Bowen* – CE 5. Enari Tuala* – WG 6. Jake Clifford* – FE 7. Jordan Biondi-Odo – HB 8. Will Bugden – PR 9. Ryan Ghietti (c) – HK 10. David Murphy – PR 11. Tom Hancock – SR 12. Nathan Wales – SR 13. Graham Clark – LK
Interchange: 14. James Clark, 15. Sheldon Powe-Hobbs, 16. Troy Kapea, 17. Emry Pere*.
* = Cowboys allocation (5 players allocated for this match).
Pride Out: Todd Carney resigned (five-eighth).
Pride In: Nathan Wales (second row).
Changes: Jordan Biondi-Odo (fullback to halfback), Jake Clifford* (halfback to five-eighth), James Clark (second row to bench), Jack Murphy (bench to fullback).
Redcliffe Dolphins: 1. Tony Tumusa, 2. Jonus Pearson, 3. Kotoni Staggs, 4. Mosese Pangai, 5. Jeremy Hawkins, 6. Joshua Fauid, 7. Cameron Cullen (c), 8. James Taylor, 9. Sheldon Pitama, 10. Sam Anderson, 11. Scott Schult, 12. Aaron Whitchurch, 13 Jamil Hopoate.
Interchange: 14. Toby Rudolf, 15. Nathan Watts, 16. Tom Geraghty, 17. Hugh Pratt.
* = Brisbane Broncos allocation (? players allocated for this match).
Coach: Adam Moog.

Position	Round 10 – 2018	P	W	D	L	B	For	Against	Diff	Pts
6	Northern Pride	9	5	0	4	1	164	153	+11	12

ROUND 11: Intrust Super Cup 2018

Sunday
20 May 2018
14:00 AEST (UTC+10)

Tweed Heads Seagulls	28 – 22	Northern Pride
Tries: Leilani Latu 1 Brayden McGrady 1 Kane Elgey 1 Kiah Cooper 1 Jack Cook 1 Goals: Lindon McGrady 4 (4 from 5)	Half-time: 28 – 12; Penalties: 5 – 11; QRL Report	Tries: 1 Nathan Wales; 1 Troy Kapea; 1 Murray Taulagi*; 1 Tom Hancock Goals: 3 Jake Clifford* (3 from 4)

Piggabeen Sports Complex
(Caramar Drive, Tweed Heads West, NSW)
Referee: Belinda Sharpe, Jarrod Cole

Mount Peter Estate Northern Pride: 1. Jack Murphy – FB 2. Murray Taulagi* – WG 3. Brett Anderson – CE 4. Javid Bowen* – CE 5. Gideon Gela-Mosby* – WG 6. Jake Clifford* – FE 7. Jordan Biondi-Odo – HB 8. Will Bugden – PR 9. Ryan Ghietti (c) – HK 10. David Murphy – PR 11. Tom Hancock – SR 18. Nathan Wales – SR 13. Graham Clark – LK
Interchange: 12. James Clark, 15. Sheldon Powe-Hobbs, 16. Troy Kapea, 17. Emry Pere*.
* = Cowboys allocation (5 players allocated for this match).
Pride Out: Enari Tuala* (wing)
Pride In: Gideon Gela-Mosby* (wing)
Tweed Heads Seagulls: 1. Brendan Elliot, 2. Ryland Jacobs, 3. Brayden Mcgrady, 4. Konrad Hurrell, 5. Kiah Cooper, 6. Lindon Mcgrady, 7. Kane Elgey*, 16. Cheyne Whitelaw (c), 17. Eli Levido, 18. Leilani Latu, 11. Lamar Liolevave, 12. Ryan Simpkins, 13. Maia Sands.
Interchange: 8. Jarrod Morfett, 9. Sam Meskell, 10. Tristan Lumley, 15 Jack Cook.
* = Gold Coast Titans allocation (? players allocated for this match).
Coach: Ben Woolf.

Position	Round 11 – 2018	P	W	D	L	B	For	Against	Diff	Pts
7	Northern Pride	10	5	0	5	1	186	182	+5	12

ROUND 12: Intrust Super Cup 2018

Saturday
26 May 2018
18:00 AEST (UTC+10)

Northern Pride	29 – 10	Norths Devils
Tries: Jake Clifford* 1 Will Bugden 1 Graham Clark 1 Gideon Gela-Mosby* 1 Murray Taulagi* 1 Goals: Jake Clifford* (4 from 5) 4 Field Goal: Jake Clifford* 1	Half-time: 17 – 0 Penalties: 8 – 8 QRL Report	Tries: 1 Alex Bishop; 1 Jack Ahearn Goals: 1 Todd Murphy (1 from 2); Field Goal:

Barlow Park
(Severin Street, Parramatta Park, QLD)
Referee: Liam Kennedy, Wyatt Raymond

Mount Peter Estate Northern Pride: 1. Jack Murphy – FB 2. Murray Taulagi* – WG 3. Brett Anderson – CE 4. Javid Bowen* – CE 5. Gideon Gela-Mosby* – WG 6. Jordan Biondi-Odo – FE 7. Jake Clifford* – HB 8. Will Bugden – PR 9. Ryan Ghietti (c) – HK 10. David Murphy – PR 11. Tom Hancock – SR 12. Ethan Lowe* – SR 13. Graham Clark – LK
Interchange: 14. Nathan Wales, 15. Sheldon Powe-Hobbs, 16. Darryn Schonig, 17. Emry Pere*.
* = Cowboys allocation (6 players allocated for this match).
Pride Out: James Clark (bench), Troy Kapea (bench).
Pride In: Ethan Lowe* (second row), Darryn Schonig (bench).
Changes: Jake Clifford* (five-eighth to halfback), Jordan Biondi-Odo (halfback to five-eighth), Nathan Wales (second row to bench).
Northern Suburbs Devils: 1. Jack Ahearn, 2. Namila Davui, 3. Luke Pollock, 4. Gehamat Shibasaki, 5. Chevi Ellis, 6. Troy Dargan, 7. Todd Murphy, 8. Oshae Tuiasau, 9. Calum Gahan, 14. Guy Williams, 11. Iain Riccardi, 12. Brandon Lee, 13. John Palavi (c).
interchange: 10. Jamayne Taunoa-Brown, 15. Carne Doyle-Manga, 17. Dalton Phillips, 19. Alex Bishop.
* = Brisbane Broncos allocation (? players allocated for this match).
Coach: Rohan Smith

Position	Round 12 – 2018	P	W	D	L	B	For	Against	Diff	Pts
5	Northern Pride	11	6	0	5	1	215	191	+24	14

ROUND 13: Intrust Super Cup 2018

Saturday
2 June 2018
18:00 AEST (UTC+10)

Northern Pride	42 – 50	Souths Logan Magpies
Tries: Gideon Gela-Mosby* 1 Graham Clark 1 Troy Kapea 1 Javid Bowen* 1 Murray Taulagi* 1 Brett Anderson 1 Jake Clifford* 1 Goals: Jake Clifford* 7 (7 from 7)	Half-time: 12 – 26; Penalties: 7 – 5 Sin Bin: Travis Waddell ----- QRL Report	Tries: 1 Guy Hamilton; 1 Thomas Flegler; 1 George Fai; 1 Brendon Gibb; 1 Paul Rokolati; 1 Simi Fatafehi Goals: 3 Guy Hamilton (3 from 6)

Barlow Park
(Severin Street, Parramatta Park, QLD)
Referee: Tyson Brough

Mount Peter Estate Northern Pride: 1. Jack Murphy – FB 2. Murray Taulagi* – WG 3. Brett Anderson – CE 4. Javid Bowen* – CE 5. Gideon Gela-Mosby* – WG 6. Jordan Biondi-Odo – FE 7. Jake Clifford* – HB 8. Will Bugden – PR 9. Ryan Ghietti (c) – HK 10. David Murphy – PR 11. Tom Hancock – SR 12. Nathan Wales – SR 13. Graham Clark – LK
Interchange: 14. Troy Kapea, 15. Sheldon Powe-Hobbs, 16. Darryn Schonig, 17. Emry Pere*.
* = Cowboys allocation (5 players allocated for this match).
Pride Out: Ethan Lowe* (second row).
Pride In: Troy Kapea (bench).
Changes: Nathan Wales (bench to second row).
Souths Logan Magpies: 1. Corey Allan, 2. Benaiah Bowie, 3. Marion Seve, 4. Daniel Russell, 5. Paul Rokolati, 6. Guy Hamilton, 7. Sam Scarlett, 8. George Fai, 9. Travis Waddell, 10. Thomas Flegler, 11. Brendon Gibb, 20. Patrick Mago, 13. Phil Dennis (c).
Interchange: 14. Jordan Scott, 15. Simi Fatafehi, 16. Daniel Tamou, 17. Sam Elliott.
* = Brisbane Broncos allocation (? players allocated for this match).
Coach: Jon Buchanan.

Position	Round 13 – 2018	P	W	D	L	B	For	Against	Diff	Pts
5	Northern Pride	12	7	0	5	1	257	221	+36	16

ROUND 14: Intrust Super Cup 2018

Saturday
9 June 2018
13:10 AEST (UTC+10)

Burleigh Bears	28 – 30	Northern Pride
Tries: Matt Robinson 1 Jamal Fogarty 1 Josh Ailaomai 1 Sami Sauiluma 1 Kurtis Rowe 1 Goals: Tyronne Roberts-Davis 4 (4 from 5)	Half-time: 6 – 12; Penalties: 5 – 6 QRL Report	Tries: 1 Murray Taulagi; 1 Connor Jones; 2 Ben Hampton*; 1 Gideon Gela-Mosby* Goals: 5 Jake Clifford* (5 from 5)

UAA Park
(Miami, Gold Coast, QLD)
Referee: Ben Watts, Chris Anderson

Mount Peter Estate Northern Pride: 1. Ben Hampton* – FB 2. Murray Taulagi* – WG 3. Brett Anderson – CE 4. Javid Bowen* – CE 5. Gideon Gela-Mosby* – WG 6. Jordan Biondi-Odo – FE 7. Jake Clifford* – HB 8. Will Bugden – PR 9. Ryan Ghietti (c) – HK 10. David Murphy – PR 11. Tom Hancock – SR 13. Graham Clark – SR 17. Emry Pere* – LK
Interchange: 14. Connor Jones, 15. Sheldon Powe-Hobbs, 16. Darryn Schonig, 19. Aidan Day.
* = Cowboys allocation (6 players allocated for this match).
Pride Out: Jack Murphy (fullback), Nathan Wales (second row), Troy Kapea (bench).
Pride In: Ben Hampton* (fullback), Connor Jones (bench), Aidan Day (bench).
Changes: Graham Clark (lock to second row), Emry Pere* (bench to lock).
Burleigh Bears: 1. Kurtis Rowe, 2. Troy Leo, 3. Sami Sauiluma, 4. Henare Wells, 5. Tyronne Roberts-Davis, 6. Dallas Wells, 7. Jamal Fogarty, 8. Luke Page (c), 9. Pat Politoni, 10.Jai Whitbread 10, 11. Hayden Schwass, 12. Matt Robinson, 13. Sam Coster.
Interchange: 14. Matthew White, 16. Josh Ailaomai, 17. Morgan Boyle, 18. Jess Savage.
* = Gold Coast Titans allocation (? players allocated for this match).
Coach: Jim Lenihan.

Position	Round 14 – 2018	P	W	D	L	B	For	Against	Diff	Pts
5	Northern Pride	13	8	0	6	1	287	249	+38	18

ROUND 15: Intrust Super Cup 2018

Saturday
16 June 2018
19:00 AEST (UTC+10)

Wynnum Manly Seagulls	16 – 22	Northern Pride
Tries: Jayden Berrell 1 Edward Burns 1 Alex Barr 1 Goals: Pat Templeman 2 (2 from 3)	Half-time: 16 – 0 Penalties: 4 – 10; QRL Report	Tries: 2 Gideon Gela-Mosby*; 1 Murray Taulagi*; 1 Brett Anderson; Goals: 3 Jake Clifford* (3 from 4)

BMD Kougari Oval
(Manly West, Brisbane, QLD)
Referee: Nick Pelgrave

Mount Peter Estate Northern Pride: 1. Jack Murphy – FB 2. Murray Taulagi* – WG 3. Brett Anderson – CE 4. Bradley Stephen – CE 5. Gideon Gela-Mosby* – WG 6. Jordan Biondi-Odo – FE 7. Jake Clifford* – HB 8. Will Bugden – PR 9. Ryan Ghietti (c) – HK 10. David Murphy – PR 11. Graham Clark – SR 12. Tom Hancock – SR 13. Emry Pere* – LK
Interchange: 14. Connor Jones, 15. Sheldon Powe-Hobbs, 16. Darryn Schonig, 17. Troy Kapea.
* = Cowboys allocation (4 players allocated for this match).
Pride Out: Ben Hampton* (fullback), Javid Bowen* (centre), Tom Hancock (second row), Aidan Day (bench).
Pride In: Jack Murphy (fullback), Bradley Stephen (centre), Ethan Lowe* (second row), Troy Kapea (bench).
Wynnum-Manly Seagulls: 3. Daniel Ogden, 2. Peter Gubb, 8. Alex Barr, 4. Delouise Hoeter, 5. Edward Burns, 6. Pat Templeman, 7. Jayden Berrell, 14. Stedman Lefau, 9. Mitchell Moore, 10. Max Elliott, 11. Salesi Funaki, 12. Atelea Vea, 13. Patrick Carrigan.
Interchange: 15. Mitchell Frei (c), 16. Lachlan Lee, 17. Keenan Palasia, 19. Kalolo Saitaua.
* = Brisbane Broncos allocation (? players allocated for this match).
Coach: Adam Brideson.

Position	Round 15 – 2018	P	W	D	L	B	For	Against	Diff	Pts
4	Northern Pride	14	9	0	5	1	309	265	+44	20

ROUND 16: Intrust Super Cup 2018

Saturday
30 June 2018
18:00 AEST (UTC+10)

Northern Pride	13 – 10	Townsville Blackhawks
Tries: Gideon Gela-Mosby* 2 Goals: Jake Clifford* 0 (0 from 2); Penalty Goals: Jake Clifford* 2 (2 from 2); Field Goal: Jake Clifford* 1	Half-time: 10 – 0 Penalties: 6 – 5 QRL Report	Tries: 1 Rod Griffin; 1 Jon Reuben; Goals: 1 Levi Dodd (1 from 2); Penalty Goals: 0 Field Goal: 0

Atherton Showgrounds
(Atherton, QLD)
Referee: Wyatt Raymond, Chris Anderson

Mount Peter Estate Northern Pride: 1. Jack Murphy – FB 2. Shawn Bowen – WG 3. Brett Anderson – CE 4. Javid Bowen* – CE 5. Gideon Gela-Mosby* – WG 6. Jordan Biondi-Odo – FE 7. Jake Clifford* – HB 8. Will Bugden – PR 9. Ryan Ghietti (c) – HK 10. David Murphy – PR 11. Graham Clark – SR 12. Ethan Lowe* – SR 13. Emry Pere* – LK
Interchange: 14. Connor Jones, 15. Sheldon Powe-Hobbs, 16. Darryn Schonig, 17. Troy Kapea.
* = Cowboys allocation (5 players allocated for this match).
Pride Out: Murray Taulagi* (wing), Bradley Stephen (centre)
Pride In: Shawn Bowen (wing), Javid Bowen* (centre), Ethan Lowe* (second row)
Townsville Blackhawks: 1. Zac Santo, 2. Jonathon Reuben, 3. Levi Dodd, 4. Justin O'neill, 5. Kalifa Faifai Loa, 6. Shaun Hudson, 7. Jaelen Feeney, 8. Cade Maloney, 9. Krys Freeman, 10. Rod Griffin, 11. Jordan Drew, 12. Andrew Niemoeller (c), 13. Temone Power.
Interchange: 14. Davin Crampton, 16. Ross Bella, 19. Brent Woolf, 22. Sione Lousi.
* = North Queensland Cowboys allocation (? players allocated for this match).
Coach: Kristian Woolf

Position	Round 16 – 2018	P	W	D	L	B	For	Against	Diff	Pts
4	Northern Pride	15	10	0	5	1	322	275	+47	22

ROUND 17: Intrust Super Cup 2018

Saturday
7 July 2018
16:00 AEST (UTC+10)

Easts Tigers	24 – 18	Northern Pride
Tries: Scott Drinkwater 2 Jarrod McInally 1 Shane Neumann 1 Goals: Billy Walters 3 (3 from 4)	Half-time: 16 – 18; Penalties: 4 – 5 QRL Report	Tries: 1 Jack Campagnolo; 2 Shawn Bowen; 1 Javid Bowen*; Goals: 1 Jack Campagnolo (1 from 4)

Totally Workwear Stadium
(Stones Corner, Brisbane, QLD)
Referee: Wyatt Raymond, Chris Anderson

Mount Peter Estate Northern Pride: 1. Jack Murphy – FB 2. Shawn Bowen – WG 3. Brett Anderson – CE 4. Javid Bowen* – CE 5. Justin Castellaro – WG 6. Jordan Biondi-Odo – FE 7. Jack Campagnolo – HB 8. Will Bugden – PR 9. Ryan Ghietti (c) – HK 10. David Murphy – PR 11. Graham Clark – SR 12. Ethan Lowe* – SR 13. Emry Pere* – LK
Interchange: 14. Connor Jones, 15. Sheldon Powe-Hobbs, 16. Darryn Schonig, 17. Troy Kapea.
* = Cowboys allocation (3 players allocated for this match).
Pride Out: Gideon Gela-Mosby* (wing), Jake Clifford* (halfback)
Pride In: Justin Castellaro (wing), Jack Campagnolo (halfback)
Eastern Suburbs Tigers: 1. Scott Drinkwater, 2. Linc Port, 3. Shane Neumann, 14. Marion Seve, 5. Jarrod Mcinally, 6. Billy Walters, 7. Ollie Olds, 8. Dave Tyrrell, 9. Chris Ostwald, 10. Brett Greinke, 11. Jake Foster (c), 12. Jarred Tuite, 13. Jack Svendsen.
Interchange: 4. Conor Carey, 15. Michael Egan, 16. Ash Little, 19. Kelma Tuilagi.
* = Melbourne Storm allocation (? players allocated for this match).
Coach: Scott Sipple

Position	Round 17 – 2018	P	W	D	L	B	For	Against	Diff	Pts
4	Northern Pride	16	10	0	6	1	340	299	+41	22

ROUND 18: Intrust Super Cup 2018

Sunday
15 July 2018
15:00 PNG Pacific Time (UTC+10)

Papua New Guinea Hunters	18 – 8	Northern Pride
Tries: Adex Wera 1 Edene Gebbie 1 Goals: Ase Boas 2 (2 from 2) Penalty Goals: Ase Boas 3 (3 from 3)	Half-time: 6 – 4 Penalties: 7 – 8 QRL Report	Tries:'; 1 Brett Anderson; 1 Javid Bowen*; Goals: 0 Jack Campagnolo (0 from 1); 0 Darryn Schonig (0 from 1); Penalty Goals: 0

Oil Search National Football Stadium
(Port Moresby, PNG)
Referee: Michael Gordon

Mount Peter Estate Northern Pride: 1. Matthew Musumeci – FB 2. Jonico Hardwick – WG 3. Brett Anderson – CE 4. Shawn Bowen – CE 5. Gideon Gela-Mosby* – WG 6. Jordan Biondi-Odo – FE 7. Jack Campagnolo – HB 8. Will Bugden – PR 9. Ryan Ghietti (c) – HK 10. David Murphy – PR 11. Graham Clark – SR 13. Ethan Lowe* – SR 15. Emry Pere* – LK
Interchange: 10. Sheldon Powe-Hobbs, 14. Connor Jones, 16. Darryn Schonig, 19. Troy Kapea.
* = Cowboys allocation (3 players allocated for this match).
Pride Out: Javid Bowen* (centre), Murray Taulagi* (wing)
Pride In: Shawn Bowen (centre), Gideon Gela-Mosby* (wing)
Changes: Sheldon Powe-Hobbs (front row to bench), David Murphy (lock to front row), Emry Pere* (bench to lock)
SP PNG Hunters: 1. Edene Gebbie, 2. Junior Rau, 3. Thompson Teteh, 4. Adex Wera, 5. Brendon Gotuno, 6. Ase Boas (c), 7. Watson Boas, 8. Enock Maki, 9. Wartovo Puara, 10. Moses Meninga, 11. Nixon Putt, 12. Willie Minoga, 13. Rhadley Brawa.
Interchange: 14. Charlie Simon, 15. Paul Wawa, 16. Mckenzie Yei, 17. Dilbert Issac.
Coach: Stanley Tepend.
- Note: This was the Pride debut for Jonico Hardwick (Pride Player 151).

Position	Round 18 – 2018	P	W	D	L	B	For	Against	Diff	Pts
5	Northern Pride	17	10	0	7	1	348	317	+31	22

ROUND 19: Intrust Super Cup 2018 - Country Week

Saturday
21 July 2018
16:00 AEST (UTC+10)

Northern Pride	34 – 24	Ipswich Jets
Tries: Gideon Gela-Mosby* 1 Jordan Biondi-Odo 1 Darryn Schonig 1 Shawn Bowen 1 Jonico Hardwick 2 Goals: Jack Campagnolo 4 (4 from 5); Ethan Lowe* 0 (0 from 1); Penalty Goal: Jack Campagnolo 1 (1 from 1)	Half-time: 4 – 12; Penalties: 9 – 6 QRL Report	Tries: 1 Marmin Barba; 1 Julian Christian; 2 Michael Purcell Goals: 3 Marmin Barba (3 from 3); 1 Wes Conlon (1 from 1); Penalty Goal: 0

John Street Oval
(Cooktown, QLD)
Referee: Chris Anderson

Mount Peter Estate Northern Pride: 1. Matthew Musumeci – FB 2. Jonico Hardwick – WG 3. Brett Anderson – CE 4. Shawn Bowen – CE 5. Gideon Gela-Mosby* – WG 6. Jordan Biondi-Odo – FE 7. Jack Campagnolo – HB 8. Will Bugden – PR 9. Ryan Ghietti (c) – HK 13. David Murphy – PR 11. Graham Clark – SR 12. Ethan Lowe* – SR 15. Emry Pere* – LK
Interchange: 10. Sheldon Powe-Hobbs, 14. Connor Jones, 16. Darryn Schonig, 17. Troy Kapea.
* = Cowboys allocation (3 players allocated for this match).
Pride Out: Javid Bowen* (centre), Murray Taulagi* (wing)
Pride In: Shawn Bowen (centre), Gideon Gela-Mosby* (wing)
Changes: Sheldon Powe-Hobbs (front row to bench), David Murphy (lock to front row), Emry Pere* (bench to lock)
Ipswich Jets: 1. Michael Purcell, 2. Marmin Barba, 3. Ben White, 4. Isimeeli Hafoka, 5. Richard Pandia, 6. Chris Ash, 7. Julian Christian, 8. Tyson Lofipo, 9. Jayden Connors, 10. Nathaniel Neale (c), 11. Rowan Winterfield, 17. Billy Mcconnachie, 13. Ben Shea.
Interchange: 15. Samuel Caslick, 16. Fakahoko Teutau, 18. Wes Conlon, 19. Mitch Carpenter.
* = Brisbane Broncos allocation (? players allocated for this match).
Coaches: Ben Walker and Shane Walker

Position	Round 19 – 2018	P	W	D	L	B	For	Against	Diff	Pts
4	Northern Pride	18	11	0	7	1	382	341	+41	24

ROUND 20: Intrust Super Cup 2018

Saturday
28 July 2018
18:00 AEST (UTC+10)

Sunshine Coast Falcons	15 – 14	Northern Pride
Tries: Jye Ballinger 1 Dane Hogan 1 Ryan Papenhuyzen 1 Goals: Ryan Papenhuyzen 1 (1 from 3); Penalty Goals: 0 Field Goal: Ryley Jacks 1	Half-time: 0 – 10; Penalties: 7 – 8 QRL Report	Tries: 1 Javid Bowen*; 1 Shawn Bowen Goals: 1 Jack Campagnolo (1 from 2); Penalty Goals: 2 Jack Campagnolo (2 from 2); Field Goal: 0

Ralph Stafford Park
(Torquay, Hervey Bay, QLD)
Referee: Michael Gordon

Mount Peter Estate Northern Pride: 1. Shawn Bowen – FB 2. Murray Taulagi* – WG 3. Brett Anderson – CE 4. Javid Bowen* – CE 5. Gideon Gela-Mosby* – WG 6. Jordan Biondi-Odo – FE 7. Jack Campagnolo – HB 8. Will Bugden – PR 9. Ryan Ghietti (c) – HK 15. Emry Pere* – PR 11. Graham Clark – SR 12. Ethan Lowe* – SR 13. David Murphy – LK
Interchange: 10. Sheldon Powe-Hobbs, 14. Connor Jones, 16. Darryn Schonig, 17. Troy Kapea.
* = Cowboys allocation (5 players allocated for this match).
Pride Out: Matthew Musumeci (fullback), Jonico Hardwick (wing).
Pride In: Murray Taulagi* (wing), Javid Bowen* (centre).
Changes: Shawn Bowen (centre to fullback), David Murphy (front row to lock), Emry Pere* (lock to front row).
Sunshine Coast Falcons: 1. Ryan Papenhuyzen, 2. Matt Soper-Lawler, 3. Justin Olam, 4. Chris Lewis, 5. Junior Ratuva, 6. Rhys Jacks, 7. Ryley Jacks, 18. Lachlan Timm, 9. Harry Grant, 10. Jacob Hind, 11. Dane Hogan (c) 12. Tom Eisenhuth, 13. Tui Kamikamica.
Interchange: 14. Lachlan Roe, 15. Jye Ballinger, 16. Louis Geraghty, 17. Sam Burns.
* = Melbourne Storm allocation (? players allocated for this match).
Coach: Craig Ingebrigtsen.

Position	Round 20 – 2018	P	W	D	L	B	For	Against	Diff	Pts
4	Northern Pride	19	11	0	8	1	396	356	+40	24

ROUND 21: Intrust Super Cup 2018

Saturday
4 August 2018
15:00 AEST (UTC+10)

Northern Pride	38 – 10	CQ Capras
Tries: Ethan Lowe* 1 Gideon Gela-Mosby* 2 Brett Anderson 1 Tom Hancock 1 Jack Campagnolo 1 Jordan Biondi-Odo 1 Goals: Jack Campagnolo 5 (5 from 7)	Half-time: 20 – 6 Penalties: 7 – 5 QRL Report	Tries: 1 Chanel Seigafo; 1 Jerry Key Goals: 1 Blake Goodman (1 from 2)

Stan Williams Park
(Manunda, Cairns, QLD)
Referee: Tim Rutherford

Mount Peter Estate Northern Pride: 1. Jack Murphy – FB 2. Matthew Musumeci – WG 3. Brett Anderson – CE 4. Shawn Bowen – CE 5. Gideon Gela-Mosby* – WG 6. Jordan Biondi-Odo – FE 7. Jack Campagnolo – HB 16. Tom Hancock – PR 9. Ryan Ghietti (c) – HK 10. Darryn Schonig – PR 11. Graham Clark – SR 12. Ethan Lowe* – SR 13. David Murphy – LK
Interchange: 8. Will Bugden, 14. Connor Jones, 15. Emry Pere*, 17. Troy Kapea.
* = Cowboys allocation (3 players allocated for this match).
Pride Out: Murray Taulagi* (wing), Javid Bowen* (centre), Sheldon Powe-Hobbs (bench).
Pride In: Jack Murphy (fullback), Matthew Musumeci (wing), Tom Hancock (front row).
Changes: Shawn Bowen (fullback to centre), William Bugden (front row to bench), Emry Pere* (front row to bench), Darryn Schonig (bench to front row).
Central Queensland Capras: 1. Zeik Foster, 2. Jace O'neill, 3. Connor Broadhurst, 4. Nathan Bassani, 5. Chanel Seigafo, 6. Blake Goodman, 7. Jack Madden (c), 8. Oliver Percy, 9. Billy Gilbert, 10. Brad Lupi, 11. Jerry Key, 15. Luke George, 13. Jamie Hill.
Interchange: 12. Junior Kirisome, 14. Wade Carra, 16. Aaron Flanagan, 18. Maipele Morseu.
* = Brisbane Broncos allocation (? players allocated for this match).
Coach: Kim Williams.

Position	Round 21 – 2018	P	W	D	L	B	For	Against	Diff	Pts
4	Northern Pride	20	12	0	8	1	434	366	+68	26

ROUND 22: Intrust Super Cup 2018

Saturday
11 August 2018
18:00 AEST (UTC+10)

Mackay Cutters	12 – 24	Northern Pride
Tries: Yamba Bowie 1 Shane Wright 1 Goals: Kyle Laybutt 2 (2 from 2); Penalty Goals: 0	Half-time: 6 – 8 Penalties: 2 – 8 Sin Bin: Jayden Hodges; David Murphy --- QRL Report	Tries: 1 Ethan Lowe*; 2 Javid Bowen*; 1 Brett Anderson; Goals: 2 Jack Campagnolo (2 from 4); Penalty Goals: 2 Jack Campagnolo (2 from 2)

BB Print Stadium
(Bridge Road, South Mackay, QLD)
Referee: Tyson Brough

Mount Peter Estate Northern Pride: 1. Jack Murphy – FB 2. Murray Taulagi* – WG 3. Brett Anderson – CE 4. Javid Bowen* – CE 5. Enari Tuala* – WG 6. Jordan Biondi-Odo – FE 7. Jack Campagnolo – HB 16. Tom Hancock – PR 9. Ryan Ghietti (c) – HK 10. Darryn Schonig – PR 11. Graham Clark – SR 12. Ethan Lowe* – SR 13. David Murphy – LK
Interchange: 8. Sheldon Powe-Hobbs, 14. Connor Jones, 15. Emry Pere*, 17. Will Bugden.
* = Cowboys allocation (5 players allocated for this match).
Pride Out: Matthew Musumeci (wing), Shawn Bowen (centre), Gideon Gela-Mosby* (wing), Troy Kapea (bench).
Pride In: Murray Taulagi* (wing), Javid Bowen* (centre), Enari Tuala* (wing), Sheldon Powe-Hobbs (bench).
Mackay Cutters: 1. Yamba Bowie, 2. Sheldon Bobbert, 3. Nathan Saumalu, 4. Blake Atherton, 5. Johnny Faletagoa'I, 6. Kyle Laybutt, 7. Zachary Butler, 8. Nick Brown, 9. Cooper Bambling (c), 10. Jordan Grant, 11. Kell Jenner, 12. Shane Wright, 13. Bennett Leslie.
Interchange: 14. Jayden Hodges, 15. Lona Kaifoto, 16. Jye Andersen, 19. Darcy Cox.
* = North Queensland Cowboys allocation (? players allocated for this match).
Coach: Steve Sheppard.

Position	Round 22 – 2018	P	W	D	L	B	For	Against	Diff	Pts
4	Northern Pride	21	13	0	8	1	458	378	+80	28

ROUND 23: Intrust Super Cup 2018

Saturday
18 August 2018
19:00 AEST (UTC+10)

Northern Pride	6 – 16	Redcliffe Dolphins
Tries: Murray Taulagi* 1 Goals: Jack Campagnolo 1 (1 from 1); Penalty Goal: 0	Half-time: 0 – 10; Penalties: 7 – 7 QRL Report	Tries: 1 Jeremy Hawkins; 1 Bryce Donovan; 1 Trai Fuller; Goals: 2 Kotoni Staggs (2 from 3); Penalty Goal: 0 Kotoni Staggs (0 from 1)

Jones Park
(Westcourt, Cairns, QLD)
Referee: Liam Kennedy, Belinda Sharpe

Mount Peter Estate Northern Pride: 1. Jack Murphy – FB 2. Murray Taulagi* – WG 3. Brett Anderson – CE 4. Javid Bowen* – CE 5. Enari Tuala* – WG 6. Jordan Biondi-Odo – FE 7. Jack Campagnolo – HB 10. Darryn Schonig – PR 9. Ryan Ghietti (c) – HK 17. Will Bugden – PR 11. Graham Clark – SR 12. Tom Hancock – SR 13. David Murphy – LK
Interchange: 8. Sheldon Powe-Hobbs, 14. Connor Jones, 15. Emry Pere*, 16. Troy Kapea.
* = Cowboys allocation (4 players allocated for this match).
Pride Out: Ethan Lowe* (second row).
Pride In: Troy Kapea (bench).
Changes: Tom Hancock (front row to second row), Will Bugden (bench to front row)
Redcliffe Dolphins: 1. Trai Fuller, 2. Josh Beehag, 3. Kotoni Staggs, 4. Tom Opacic, 5. Jeremy Hawkins, 6. Bryce Donovan, 7. Cameron Cullen (c), 8. Nick Slyney, 17. Hugh Pratt, 10. Sam Anderson, 11. Toby Rudolf, 12. Aaron Whitchurch, 13. Jamil Hopoate.
Interchange: 9. Jake Turpin, 14. Myles Lee-Taueli, 15. James Taylor, 16. Tom Geraght.
* = Brisbane Broncos allocation (? players allocated for this match).
Coach: Adam Mogg

Position	Round 23 – 2018	P	W	D	L	B	For	Against	Diff	Pts
5	Northern Pride	22	13	0	9	1	464	394	+70	28

ROUND 24: Intrust Super Cup 2018

Saturday
25 August 2018
18:00 AEST (UTC+10)

Northern Pride	10 – 10	Tweed Heads Seagulls
Tries: Enari Tuala 1 Goals: Jack Campagnolo 1 (1 from 1); Penalty Goals: Jack Campagnolo 2 (2 from 2)	Half-time: 6 – 4 Penalties: 10 – 3 Sin Bin: Kiah Cooper ----- QRL Report	Tries: 1 Kiah Cooper; 1 Lamar Liolevave; Goals: 1 Rex Johnson (1 from 2); Penalty Goals: 0

Barlow Park
(Severin Street, Parramatta Park, QLD)
Referee: Tim Rutherford

Mount Peter Estate Northern Pride: 1. Jack Murphy – FB 2. Murray Taulagi* – WG 3. Brett Anderson – CE 4. Javid Bowen* – CE 5. Enari Tuala* – WG 6. Jordan Biondi-Odo – FE 7. Jack Campagnolo – HB 17. Will Bugden – PR 9. Ryan Ghietti (c) – HK 15. Emry Pere* – PR 11. Graham Clark – SR 12. Tom Hancock – SR 13. David Murphy – LK
Interchange: 10. Darryn Schonig, 14. Connor Jones, 16. Peter Hola*, 17. Sheldon Powe-Hobbs.
* = Cowboys allocation (5 players allocated for this match).
Pride Out: Troy Kapea (bench).
Pride In: Peter Hola* (bench).
Changes: Darryn Schonig (front row to bench), Emry Pere* (bench to front row).
Tweed Seagulls: 1. Alex Grant, 2. Ryland Jacobs, 3. Brendan Elliot, 4. Lamar Liolevave (c), 5. Kiah Cooper, 6. Eli Levido, 7. Rex Johnson, 15. Kalani Going, 9. Jack Cook, 16. Leilani Latu, 11. Tristan Lumley, 12. Bryce Cartwright, 13. Kirk Murphy
Interchange: 10. Jaleel Seve-Derbas, 17. Shaun Carney, 18. Sam Meskell, 20. Maia Sands.
* = Gold Coast Titans allocation (? players allocated for this match).
Coach: Ben Woolf.

Position	Round 24 – 2018	P	W	D	L	B	For	Against	Diff	Pts
4	Northern Pride	23	13	1	9	1	474	404	+70	29

=== 2018 Ladder ===
2018 Queensland Cup
Pos	Team	Pld	W	D	L	B	PF	PA	PD	Pts
1	Redcliffe Dolphins (P)	23	16	1	6	1	600	382	+218	35
2	Burleigh Bears	23	16	0	7	1	589	427	+162	34
3	Townsville Blackhawks	23	15	0	8	1	571	348	+223	32
4	Northern Pride	23	13	1	9	1	474	404	+70	29
5	Easts Tigers	23	13	0	10	1	576	503	+73	28
6	Ipswich Jets	23	13	0	10	1	554	505	+49	28
7	Papua New Guinea Hunters	23	13	0	10	1	444	418	+26	28
8	Norths Devils	23	11	0	12	1	516	553	-37	24
9	Souths Logan Magpies	23	10	0	13	1	534	499	+35	22
10	Sunshine Coast Falcons	23	10	0	13	1	453	464	-11	22
11	Tweed Heads Seagulls	23	9	1	13	1	435	634	-199	21
12	Wynnum Manly Seagulls	23	9	0	14	1	472	593	-121	20
13	Central Queensland Capras	23	7	0	16	1	390	576	-186	16
14	Mackay Cutters	23	4	1	18	1	386	688	-302	11

==== Northern Pride (regular season 2018) ====
- Win = 13 (7 of 12 home games, 6 of 11 away games)
- Loss = 9 (4 of 12 home games, 5 of 11 away games)
- Draw = 1 (1 of 12 home games, 0 of 11 away games)

Round	1	2	3	4	5	6	7	8	9	10	11	12	13	14	15	16	17	18	19	20	21	22	23	24
Result	L	W	W	W	L	L	L	W	B	W	L	W	L	W	W	W	L	L	W	L	W	W	L	D
Ground	H	H	A	H	A	H	A	H	B	A	A	H	H	A	A	H	A	A	H	A	H	A	H	H

Source: https://web.archive.org/web/20120916041305/http://www.qrl.com.au/
A = Away; H = Home; B = Bye; W = Win; D = Draw; L = Loss; P = Postpone

== Final series ==
Elimination Finals
4	Northern Pride	0
5	Easts	32
3	Townsville	12
6	Ipswich	32

Major / Minor Semi-finals
1	Redcliffe	13
2	Burleigh	6
5	Easts	50
6	Ipswich	20

Preliminary final
2	Burleigh	26
5	Easts	36

Grand Final
1	Redcliffe	36
5	Easts	22

Finals Week 1 - Elimination Final

Saturday
1 September 2018
15:00 AEST (UTC+10)

Northern Pride	0 – 32	Easts Tigers
Tries: Goals: 0	Half-time: 0 – 20; Penalties: 8 – 3 QRL Report	Tries: 3 Josh Ralph; 1 Sam Kasiano; 1 Shane Neumann; 1 Marion Seve; Goals: 4 Brayden Torpy (4 from 6)

Stan Williams Park
(CDRL Brothers Cairns ground, Manunda, Cairns)
Referee: Tyson Brough, Chris Anderson

Mount Peter Estate Northern Pride: 1. Jack Murphy – FB 2. Murray Taulagi* – WG 3. Brett Anderson – CE 4. Enari Tuala* – CE 5. Shawn Bowen – WG 6. Jordan Biondi-Odo – FE 7. Jake Clifford* – HB 8. Will Bugden – PR 9. Ryan Ghietti (c) – HK 10. Darryn Schonig – PR 11. Graham Clark – SR 12. Tom Hancock – SR 13. David Murphy – LK
Interchange: 14. Connor Jones, 15. Emry Pere*, 16. Troy Kapea, 17. Sheldon Powe-Hobbs.
* = Cowboys allocation (4 players allocated for this match).
Pride Out: Javid Bowen* (centre), Jack Campagnolo (halfback), Peter Hola* (bench).
Pride In: Shawn Bowen (wing), Jake Clifford* (halfback), Troy Kapea (bench).
Changes: Enari Tuala* (wing to centre), Emry Pere* (front row to bench), Darryn Schonig (bench to front row).
Easts Tigers: 1. Linc Port, 2. Kea Pere, 3. Shane Neumann, 4. Marion Seve, 18. Leon Ellia-Niukore, 6. Josh Ralph, 7. Brayden Torpy, 8. Albert Vete, 9. Tom Butterfield, 20. Sam Kasiano, 11. Jake Foster (c), 12. Patrick Kaufusi, 13. Jack Svendsen.
Interchange: 14. Chris Ostwald, 15. Dave Tyrrell, 16. Tino Fa'asuamaleaui, 17. Kelma Tuilagi.
Coach: Scott Sipple.
* = Melbourne Storm allocation (? players allocated for this match)

== 2018 Northern Pride players ==
Pride player	Appearances	Tries	Goals	Field goals	Pts
Aidan Day	2	0	0	0	0
Bradley Stephen	1	0	0	0	0
Brett Anderson	24	7	0	0	28
Colin Wilkie	2	0	0	0	0
Connor Jones	15	1	0	0	4
Darryn Schonig	21	2	0	0	8
David Murphy	24	2	0	0	8
Graham Clark	24	2	0	0	8
Jack Campagnolo	8	2	22	0	52
Jack Murphy	17	0	0	0	0
James Clark	4	0	0	0	0
Jonico Hardwick	2	2	0	0	8
Jordan Biondi-Odo	20	2	0	0	8
Justin Castellaro	4	1	0	0	4
Matthew Musumeci	3	0	0	0	0
Nathan Wales	9	2	0	0	8
Ryan Ghietti	24	0	0	0	0
Shawn Bowen	10	7	0	0	28
Sheldon Powe-Hobbs	16	0	0	0	0
Todd Carney	8	1	2	0	8
Tom Hancock	19	2	0	0	8
Troy Kapea	20	2	0	0	8
Will Bugden	24	2	0	0	8

=== North Queensland Cowboys who played for the Pride in 2013 ===
Cowboys player	Appearances	Tries	Goals	Field goals	Pts
Ben Hampton*	1	2	0	0	8
Emry Pere*	24	1	0	0	4
Enari Tuala*	12	5	0	0	20
Ethan Lowe*	8	5	0	0	20
Gideon Gela-Mosby*	12	10	0	0	40
Jake Clifford*	16	11	46	2	138
Javid Bowen*	14	6	0	0	24
Murray Taulagi*	19	10	0	0	40
Peter Hola*	1	0	0	0	0
