= Emry Pere =

New Zealand rugby league footballer

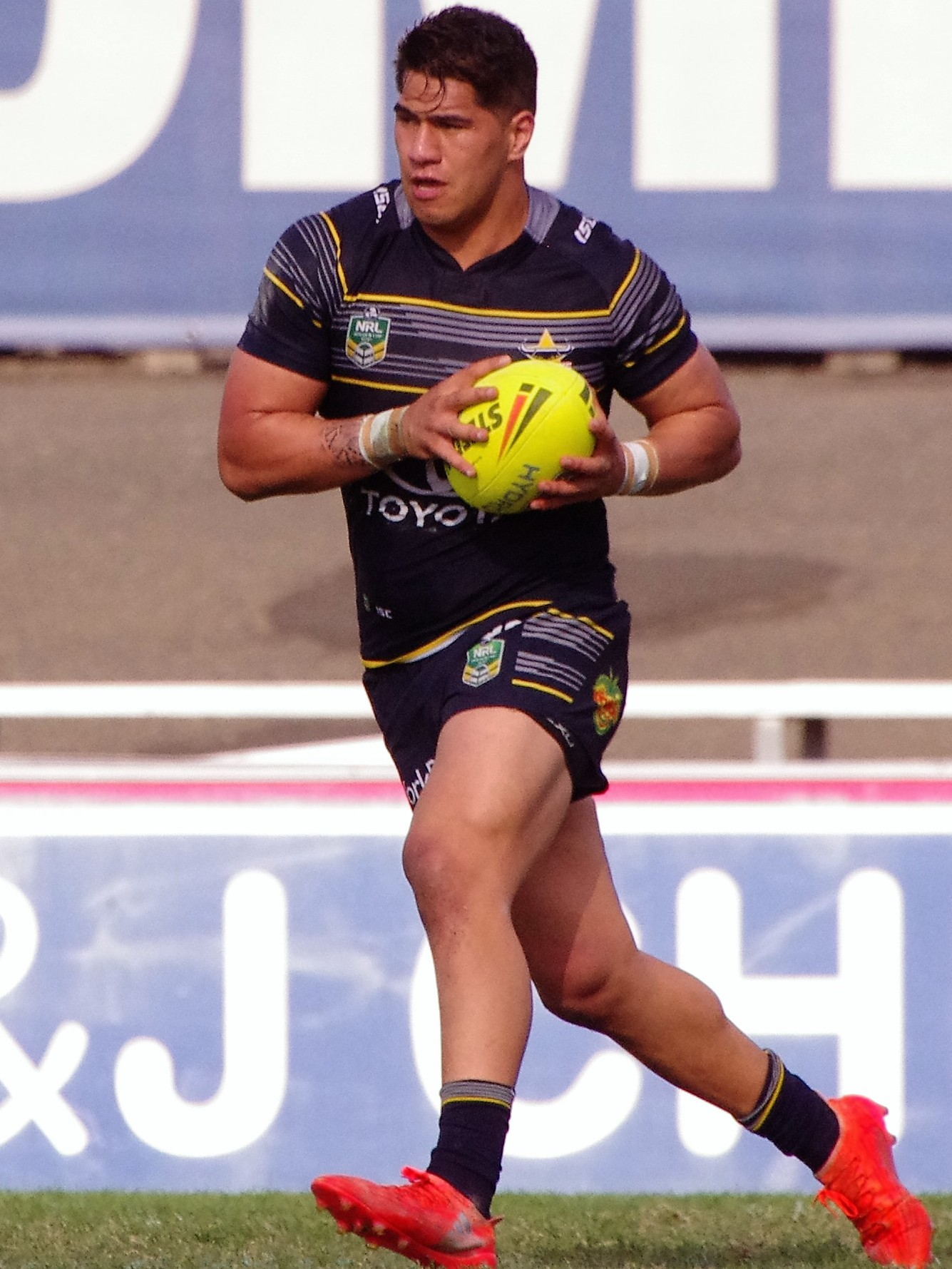

Personal information
- Born: 8 September 1998 (age 27) Huntly, Waikato, New Zealand
- Height: 193 cm (6 ft 4 in)
- Weight: 113 kg (17 st 11 lb)

Playing information
- Position: Prop, Lock
Club
Years	Team	Pld	T	G	FG	P
2020	North Qld Cowboys	2	0	0	0	0
Representative
Years	Team	Pld	T	G	FG	P
2021	Māori All Stars	1	0	0	0	0
- Source: As of 4 March 2026

Emry Pere (born 8 September 1998) is a New Zealand professional rugby league footballer who plays as a prop for the Western Clydesdales in the Queensland Cup.

He previously played for the North Queensland Cowboys in the National Rugby League.

== Background ==
Born in Huntly, New Zealand, Pere is of Māori descent and played his junior rugby league for Taniwharau. At age 9, he moved to Australia, where he played junior rugby league for the Helensvale Hornets and attended Keebra Park State High School. He later attended The Southport School, where he played for their rugby union side. He was a member of the Gold Coast Titans development squads before signing with the North Queensland Cowboys.

== Playing career ==
In 2014, Pere played for Gold Coast Green in the Cyril Connell Cup, moving up to their Mal Meninga Cup side in 2015. In 2016, he moved to Townsville, playing in the Townsville Blackhawks Mal Meninga Cup-winning side. Later that year, he made his debut for the North Queensland Cowboys under-20 side and was selected in the Queensland under-18 team. In 2017, he again played for the North Queensland Cowboys under-20 side and represented the Junior Kiwis.

In 2018, Pere joined North Queensland's NRL squad and spent the season playing for the Northern Pride in the Queensland Cup. In October 2018, he once again represented the Junior Kiwis. In 2019, he switched feeder clubs to the Mackay Cutters, playing 22 games for them that season.

=== 2020 ===
On 31 July, Pere re-signed with the North Queensland club until the end of the 2022 season. In Round 13 of the 2020 NRL season, Pere made his NRL debut for the North Queensland Cowboys against the Gold Coast. Pere played just one other NRL game in 2020, coming off the bench in a Round 19 loss to the Penrith Panthers.

=== 2021 to present ===
Pere made his international debut for the Maori against the indigenous, which ended in a 10 all draw.

Emry signed a 1 year contract to play for the Gold Coast Titans in the 2023 NRL Season. He played 12 games for the Burleigh Bears and scored a try throughout the season, eventually losing the 2023 Queensland Cup grand final to the Brisbane Tigers 22-18.

In 2024 he signed to play for Western Clydesdales where he is the team's captain.

== Statistics ==
=== NRL ===
Statistics are correct to the end of the 2020 season

Season	Team	Matches	T	G	GK %	F/G	Pts
2020	North Queensland	2	0	0	—	0	0
Career totals		2	0	0	—	0	0
