= List of North Queensland Cowboys players =

This article lists all rugby league footballers who have played first-grade for the North Queensland Cowboys in the National Rugby League.

Notes:

- Debut: Players are listed in order of player cap number as published by the club on the Cowboys Roll, with inaugural captain Laurie Spina given the honour of being Cowboys player 1.
- Appearances: North Queensland Cowboys games only, not a total of their career games. For example, Brent Tate has played a career total of 229 first-grade games but of those, 67 were at North Queensland.
- Previous Club: refers to the previous first-grade rugby league club (NRL or Super League) the player played at and does not refer to any junior club, rugby union club or a rugby league club he was signed to but never played at.
- The statistics in this table are correct as of round 12 of the 2026 NRL season.

== List of players ==
Cap no.	Name	Nationality	Cowboys career	Debut round	Previous club	Appearances	Tries	Goals	Field goals	Points
1.	Laurie Spina	(Australia)	1995	Rd. 1	Cronulla-Sutherland Sharks	13	1	0	0	4
2.	Martin Bella	(Australia)	1995	Rd. 1	Canterbury-Bankstown Bulldogs	14	0	0	0	0
3.	David Bouveng	(Australia)	1995–96	Rd. 1	Gold Coast Chargers	21	10	0	0	40
4.	Ian Dunemann	(Australia)	1995–97	Rd. 1	Debut	32	6	7	0	38
5.	Paul Galea	(Australia)	1995–97	Rd. 1	Gold Coast Chargers	25	4	0	0	16
6.	Damian Gibson	(Australia) (Wales)	1995–96	Rd. 1	Debut	31	7	1	0	30
7.	Willie Morganson	(Australia)	1995–96	Rd. 1	Brisbane Broncos	12	4	0	0	16
8.	Ian Russell	(Australia)	1995–96	Rd. 1	Illawarra Steelers	12	0	0	0	0
9.	Dean Schifilliti	(Australia)	1995–96	Rd. 1	South Sydney Rabbitohs	11	0	0	0	0
10.	Wayne Sing	(Australia)	1995–96	Rd. 1	Sydney Roosters	35	0	0	0	0
11.	John Skardon	(Australia)	1995–97	Rd. 1	Gold Coast Chargers	22	6	0	0	24
12.	Adrian Vowles	(Australia) (Scotland)	1995–96	Rd. 1	Gold Coast Chargers	41	5	5	0	30
13.	Andrew Whittington	(Australia)	1995	Rd. 1	Gold Coast Chargers	11	0	0	0	0
14.	George Bartlett	(Australia)	1995–96	Rd. 1	North Sydney Bears	27	3	0	0	12
15.	Shane Christensen	(Australia)	1995	Rd. 1	Newcastle Knights	10	1	0	0	4
16.	Leigh Groves	(Australia)	1995–96	Rd. 1	Gold Coast Chargers	19	1	0	0	4
17.	Noel Solomon	(Australia)	1995	Rd. 1	North Sydney Bears	6	0	0	0	0
18.	David Maiden	(Scotland)	1995	Rd. 2	Debut	2	0	0	0	0
19.	Jamie Mathiou	(Australia) (Republic of Ireland)	1995–96	Rd. 2	North Sydney Bears	11	1	0	0	4
20.	Paul Morris	(Australia)	1995	Rd. 2	Brisbane Broncos	2	0	0	0	0
21.	Bruce Sinclair	(Australia)	1995	Rd. 2	Sydney Roosters	11	0	0	0	0
22.	Glen Murphy	(Australia)	1995–99	Rd. 3	Debut	52	4	0	0	16
23.	Jason Erba	(Australia)	1995	Rd. 4	Brisbane Broncos	5	0	0	0	0
24.	Steven Holmes	(Australia)	1995	Rd. 4	Debut	5	0	2	0	4
25.	Justin Loomans	(Australia)	1995–97	Rd. 4	Debut	44	19	0	0	76
26.	Peter Jones	(Australia)	1995–97, 1999–02	Rd. 5	Debut	131	13	0	0	52
27.	Craig Menkins	(Australia)	1995	Rd. 7	Western Suburbs Magpies	4	0	0	0	0
28.	Craig Teitzel	(Australia)	1995	Rd. 8	Illawarra Steelers	12	0	0	0	0
29.	Jonathan Davies	(Wales)	1995	Rd. 10	Warrington Wolves	9	1	19	1	43
30.	Jason Martin	(Australia)	1995–96	Rd. 11	Newcastle Knights	20	3	0	0	12
31.	Robert Piva	(New Zealand) (Samoa)	1995	Rd. 11	Wakefield Trinity Wildcats	9	0	0	0	0
32.	Michael Hogue	(Australia)	1995	Rd. 14	Debut	4	0	0	0	0
33.	Faron Anderson	(Australia)	1995–96	Rd. 15	Debut	3	0	0	0	0
34.	Reggie Cressbrook	(Australia)	1995–97	Rd. 15	Debut	34	5	17	0	54
35.	Paul Bowman	(Australia)	1995–07	Rd. 16	Debut	203	62	1	0	250
36.	Ray Blackman	(Australia)	1995	Rd. 19	Debut	3	1	0	0	4
37.	Aaron Ketchell	(Australia)	1995–97	Rd. 20	Debut	12	0	0	0	0
38.	Andrew Meads	(Australia)	1995	Rd. 22	Debut	1	0	0	0	0
39.	Noel Slade	(Australia)	1995	Rd. 22	Debut	1	0	0	0	0
40.	Scott Brown	(Australia)	1996	Rd. 2	Cronulla-Sutherland Sharks	6	0	0	0	0
41.	Jason Death	(Australia)	1996–98	Rd. 2	Canberra Raiders	45	5	0	0	20
42.	Steve Edmed	(Australia)	1996	Rd. 2	Balmain Tigers	21	1	0	0	4
43.	Shane Howarth	(Australia)	1996	Rd. 2	Debut	12	1	21	3	49
44.	Martin Locke	(Australia)	1996–00	Rd. 2	South Queensland Crushers	54	2	0	0	8
45.	Whetu Taewa	(New Zealand)	1996	Rd. 2	New Zealand Warriors	12	2	0	0	8
46.	Kris Tassell	(Australia) (Wales)	1996–99	Rd. 2	Canterbury-Bankstown Bulldogs	42	18	0	0	72
47.	Willie Poching	(New Zealand) (Samoa)	1996	Rd. 3	New Zealand Warriors	16	0	2	0	4
48.	Se'e Solomona	(New Zealand) (Samoa)	1996	Rd. 6	New Zealand Warriors	4	0	0	0	0
49.	Andrew Dunemann	(Australia)	1996–98	Rd. 7	Gold Coast Chargers	51	8	3	4	42
50.	Andrew Bulmer	(Australia)	1996	Rd. 9	Debut	1	0	0	0	0
51.	Michael Coorey	(Australia) (Lebanon)	1996, 1998	Rd. 11	Debut	18	1	0	0	4
52.	John Buttigieg	(Australia)	1996–03	Rd. 13	Debut	101	5	0	0	20
53.	Marshall Miller	(Australia)	1996–97	Rd. 15	Debut	7	4	0	0	16
54.	Graham White	(Australia)	1996	Rd. 15	Debut	1	0	0	0	0
55.	Liam Johnson	(Australia)	1996, 1998	Rd. 17	Debut	8	1	0	0	4
56.	Dion Cope	(Australia)	1997	Rd. 1	Cronulla-Sutherland Sharks	7	0	0	0	0
57.	Owen Cunningham	(Australia)	1997–98	Rd. 1	Manly Warringah Sea Eagles	41	1	0	0	4
58.	Jason Ferris	(Australia)	1997–98	Rd. 1	Canberra Raiders	26	2	7	2	24
59.	John Lomax	(New Zealand)	1997–99	Rd. 1	Canberra Raiders	44	1	0	0	4
60.	Scott Mahon	(Australia)	1997–98	Rd. 1	Parramatta Eels	18	4	0	0	16
61.	Ray Mercy	(Australia)	1997–98	Rd. 1	Parramatta Eels	30	18	0	0	72
62.	Luke Phillips	(Australia)	1997	Rd. 1	Canberra Raiders	17	8	45	0	122
63.	Ian Roberts	(England) (Australia)	1997–98	Rd. 1	Manly Warringah Sea Eagles	29	3	0	0	12
64.	Tyran Smith	(New Zealand)	1997	Rd. 1	South Sydney Rabbitohs	9	1	0	0	4
65.	Bert Tabuai	(Australia)	1997–98	Rd. 1	Debut	10	1	0	0	4
66.	Steve Walters	(Australia)	1997–98	Rd. 1	Canberra Raiders	37	6	0	0	24
67.	Kyle Warren	(Australia)	1997–01	Rd. 1	Debut	87	26	0	0	104
68.	Jim Ahmat	(Australia)	1997–98	Rd. 2	Debut	4	2	0	0	8
69.	Mark Shipway	(Australia)	1997–01	Rd. 2	Debut	91	9	0	0	36
70.	John Doyle	(Australia)	1997–02	Rd. 4	Debut	64	9	6	0	48
71.	Luke Scott	(Australia)	1997–98	Rd. 6	Debut	22	3	0	0	12
72.	Jason Ryan	(Australia)	1997	Rd. 7	South Sydney Rabbitohs	1	0	0	0	0
73.	Adam Warwick	(Australia)	1997–98	Rd. 7	Debut	13	2	0	0	8
74.	Shane Vincent	(Australia)	1997	Rd. 11	South Sydney Rabbitohs	2	0	0	0	0
75.	Dale Fritz	(Australia)	1998	Rd. 1	Perth Reds	21	0	0	0	0
76.	Noa Nadruku	(Fiji)	1998–99	Rd. 1	Canberra Raiders	39	17	0	0	68
77.	Dale Shearer	(Australia)	1998	Rd. 1	Sydney Roosters	13	2	2	0	12
78.	Scott Wilson	(Australia)	1998	Rd. 1	Perth Reds	2	0	0	0	0
79.	Josh Hannay	(Australia)	1998–06	Rd. 3	Debut	150	49	343	0	882
80.	Scott Prince	(Australia)	1998–00	Rd. 4	Debut	53	9	17	0	70
81.	Paul Pensini	(Italy)	1998–01	Rd. 14	Debut	17	1	0	0	4
82.	Scott Donald	(Australia)	1998–00	Rd. 19	Debut	4	1	0	0	4
83.	John Malu	(New Zealand)	1998	Rd. 20	Debut	2	0	0	0	0
84.	Scott Whiting	(Australia)	1998, 2002–03	Rd. 23	Debut	16	0	0	0	0
85.	Denny Lambert	(Australia)	1998	Rd. 24	Debut	1	0	0	0	0
86.	Geoff Bell	(Australia) (Scotland)	1999–01	Rd. 2	Cronulla-Sutherland Sharks	33	9	0	0	36
87.	Greg Bourke	(Australia)	1999–00	Rd. 2	Sydney Roosters	13	0	24	0	48
88.	Brett Boyd	(Australia)	1999–00	Rd. 2	Penrith Panthers	27	3	0	0	12
89.	Darrien Doherty	(Australia)	1999–00	Rd. 2	Adelaide Rams	8	0	0	0	0
90.	Jody Gall	(Australia)	1999	Rd. 2	Penrith Panthers	12	0	0	0	0
91.	Noel Goldthorpe	(Australia)	1999–00	Rd. 2	Adelaide Rams	35	1	28	0	60
92.	Paul Green	(Australia)	1999–00	Rd. 2	Cronulla-Sutherland Sharks	35	7	0	0	28
93.	Brett Hetherington	(Australia)	1999–01	Rd. 2	Canberra Raiders	23	1	0	0	4
94.	Matthew Ryan	(Australia)	1999	Rd. 2	Canterbury-Bankstown Bulldogs	9	3	0	0	12
95.	Chad Halliday	(Australia)	1999–00	Rd. 3	Sydney Roosters	16	2	0	0	8
96.	Ben Rauter	(Australia)	1999–00	Rd. 3	Canberra Raiders	9	0	0	0	0
97.	Paul Dezolt	(Australia) (Italy)	1999–03	Rd. 4	Debut	30	5	0	0	20
98.	Damien Smith	(Australia)	1999–01	Rd. 5	St Helens R.F.C.	30	12	0	0	48
99.	Brian Jellick	(New Zealand)	1999–01	Rd. 7	Debut	48	15	0	0	60
100.	Adam Connelly	(Australia)	1999–01	Rd. 9	Debut	6	7	0	0	28
101.	George Wilson	(Australia)	1999	Rd. 10	Paris Saint-Germain	1	0	0	0	0
102.	Scott Asimus	(Australia)	1999	Rd. 14	Debut	1	0	0	0	0
103.	Shaun Valentine	(Australia)	1999–02	Rd. 14	Debut	36	2	0	0	8
104.	Leigh McWilliams	(Australia)	1999–05	Rd. 22	Debut	67	4	0	0	16
105.	John Manning	(Australia)	1999–01	Rd. 23	Debut	15	3	0	0	12
106.	Shane Muspratt	(Australia)	1999–03, 2006–07	Rd. 24	Debut	58	2	0	0	8
107.	Nick Paterson	(Australia)	1999–01	Rd. 25	Debut	15	1	0	0	4
108.	Craig Smith	(Australia)	1999	Rd. 26	Debut	1	0	0	0	0
109.	Tim Brasher	(Australia)	2000, 2002	Rd. 1	South Sydney Rabbitohs	19	4	0	0	16
110.	Nathan Fien	(Australia) (New Zealand)	2000–04	Rd. 1	Debut	91	17	0	4	72
111.	Glenn Morrison	(Australia)	2000–04	Rd. 1	North Sydney Bears	94	32	20	0	168
112.	Jason Nicol	(Australia)	2000	Rd. 1	South Sydney Rabbitohs	3	0	0	0	0
113.	Julian O'Neill	(Australia)	2000–01	Rd. 1	South Sydney Rabbitohs	47	14	122	0	300
114.	Robert Relf	(Australia)	2000–01	Rd. 1	Canterbury-Bankstown Bulldogs	45	8	0	0	32
115.	Graham Appo	(Australia)	2000	Rd. 3	Sydney Roosters	15	4	3	0	22
116.	Jeremy Schloss	(Australia)	2000	Rd. 4	South Sydney Rabbitohs	18	3	0	0	12
117.	Des Clark	(Australia)	2000	Rd. 7	St Helens R.F.C.	2	0	0	0	0
118.	Grant Reibel	(Australia)	2000, 2002	Rd. 12	Debut	5	0	0	0	0
119.	Shane Kenward	(Australia)	2000	Rd. 16	Wakefield Trinity Wildcats	2	0	0	0	0
120.	Naipolioni Kuricibi	(Australia)	2000–01	Rd. 16	Debut	5	1	0	0	4
121.	Jamie McDonald	(Australia)	2000–04	Rd. 18	Adelaide Rams	48	1	0	0	4
122.	Daniel Strickland	(Australia)	2000–04, 2006	Rd. 18	Debut	62	2	0	0	8
123.	Bruce Mamando	(Papua New Guinea)	2000–01	Rd. 25	Adelaide Rams	2	0	0	0	0
124.	Matt Bowen	(Australia)	2001–13	Rd. 1	Debut	270	130	36	5	597
125.	Trent Leis	(Australia)	2001	Rd. 1	Debut	17	5	21	0	62
126.	Tim Maddison	(Australia)	2001–02	Rd. 2	Cronulla-Sutherland Sharks	27	2	0	0	8
127.	Lee Oudenryn	(Australia)	2001	Rd. 2	New Zealand Warriors	3	0	0	0	0
128.	Tarin Bradford	(Australia)	2001–02	Rd. 4	Debut	5	2	0	0	8
129.	Adam Nable	(Australia)	2001	Rd. 4	Wests Tigers	1	0	0	0	0
130.	Chris Sheppard	(Australia)	2001–05, 2008	Rd. 4	Debut	61	5	0	2	22
131.	Chris Muckert	(Australia)	2001–03	Rd. 7	Debut	46	6	0	0	24
132.	Micheal Luck	(Australia)	2001–05	Rd. 10	Debut	76	5	0	0	20
133.	George Gatis	(Australia) (Greece)	2001–03, 2008	Rd. 19	Debut	25	4	0	0	16
134.	Danny Moore	(Australia)	2001	Rd. 25	London Broncos	2	0	0	0	0
135.	Ken McGuinness	(Australia)	2002	Rd. 1	Wests Tigers	9	1	0	0	4
136.	Matthew Petersen	(Australia) (United States)	2002	Rd. 1	Debut	8	2	0	0	8
137.	Matt Sing	(Australia)	2002–06	Rd. 1	Sydney Roosters	104	73	0	0	292
138.	David Thompson	(Australia)	2002–03	Rd. 1	Canterbury-Bankstown Bulldogs	27	0	0	0	0
139.	Ashley Alberts	(Australia)	2002	Rd. 4	Debut	5	1	0	0	4
140.	Ty Williams	(Australia)	2002–10	Rd. 4	Debut	151	85	0	0	340
141.	Jaiman Lowe	(Australia)	2002–05	Rd. 5	Debut	54	3	0	0	12
142.	Ben Laity	(Australia)	2002	Rd. 10	Debut	1	0	0	0	0
143.	Aaron Payne	(Australia)	2002–12	Rd. 12	Debut	219	25	0	1	101
144.	Simon Phillips	(Australia)	2002	Rd. 12	Debut	4	1	0	0	4
145.	Tevita Amone	(Australia)	2002	Rd. 15	Western Suburbs Magpies	3	0	0	0	0
146.	Derrick Watkins	(Australia)	2002–03	Rd. 19	Debut	3	0	0	0	0
147.	Kevin Campion	(Australia) (Republic of Ireland)	2003–04	Rd. 1	New Zealand Warriors	39	2	0	0	8
148.	Paul McNicholas	(Australia) (Republic of Ireland)	2003	Rd. 1	South Sydney Rabbitohs	7	1	0	0	4
149.	David Myles	(Australia) (United States)	2003–05	Rd. 1	New Zealand Warriors	57	18	1	0	74
150.	Paul Rauhihi	(New Zealand)	2003–05	Rd. 1	Canterbury-Bankstown Bulldogs	72	6	1	0	26
151.	Brenton Bowen	(Australia)	2003–07	Rd. 2	Debut	45	22	0	0	88
152.	Neil Sweeney	(Australia)	2003–07	Rd. 6	Newcastle Knights	49	16	2	0	68
153.	Jason Barsley	(Australia)	2003, 2005	Rd. 13	Debut	4	2	0	0	8
154.	Aaron Morgan	(Australia)	2003	Rd. 15	Debut	2	2	0	0	8
155.	Daniel Sorbello	(Australia)	2003–04	Rd. 18	Debut	2	0	0	0	0
156.	Jacob Lillyman	(Australia)	2003, 2005–08	Rd. 22	Debut	62	3	0	0	12
157.	Rod Jensen	(Australia)	2004–07	Rd. 1	Canberra Raiders	58	19	0	0	76
158.	Travis Norton	(Australia)	2004–06	Rd. 1	Canterbury-Bankstown Bulldogs	58	8	0	0	32
159.	Luke O'Donnell	(Australia)	2004–10	Rd. 1	Wests Tigers	117	23	0	0	92
160.	Mitchell Sargent	(Australia)	2004–06	Rd. 1	Melbourne Storm	66	3	0	0	12
161.	Shane Tronc	(Australia)	2004–09	Rd. 7	Debut	125	10	0	0	40
162.	David Faiumu	(New Zealand) (Samoa)	2004–08	Rd. 11	Debut	76	8	0	0	32
163.	Steve Southern	(Australia)	2004–10	Rd. 14	Debut	124	12	0	0	48
164.	Matthew Scott	(Australia)	2004–19	Rd. 19	Debut	268	19	0	0	76
165.	Justin Smith	(Australia)	2005–08	Rd. 1	South Sydney Rabbitohs	82	14	11	0	78
166.	Johnathan Thurston	(Australia)	2005–18	Rd. 1	Canterbury-Bankstown Bulldogs	294	80	923	16	2182
167.	Carl Webb	(Australia)	2005–10	Rd. 1	Brisbane Broncos	115	16	0	0	64
168.	Brett Firman	(Australia)	2005–06	Rd. 20	Sydney Roosters	18	3	0	0	12
169.	Clint Amos	(Australia)	2006, 2009–11	Rd. 2	Debut	16	0	0	0	0
170.	Gavin Cooper	(Australia)	2006, 2011–20	Rd. 2	Debut	247	72	2	0	292
171.	Ashley Graham	(Australia)	2006–13	Rd. 7	Parramatta Eels	161	84	25	0	386
172.	Robert Tanielu	(Australia)	2006	Rd. 10	Melbourne Storm	3	0	0	0	0
173.	Ray Cashmere	(Australia)	2006–08	Rd. 16	Wests Tigers	54	5	0	0	20
174.	Mark Henry	(Australia)	2006–08	Rd. 17	Debut	41	10	0	0	40
175.	Brent McConnell	(Australia)	2006	Rd. 17	Debut	3	1	2	0	8
176.	Sione Faumuina	(New Zealand)	2007–08	Rd. 1	New Zealand Warriors	32	4	0	0	16
177.	Jason Smith	(Australia)	2007	Rd. 1	Canberra Raiders	20	3	0	0	12
178.	Jackson Nicolau	(Australia)	2007–08	Rd. 3	Debut	2	0	0	0	0
179.	Scott Bolton	(Australia)	2007–19	Rd. 4	Debut	246	19	1	0	78
180.	Ben Vaeau	(New Zealand) (Cook Islands)	2007–08	Rd. 6	Brisbane Broncos	19	1	0	0	4
181.	Ben Farrar	(Australia)	2007–09	Rd. 7	Debut	38	15	0	0	60
182.	Scott Minto	(Australia)	2007	Rd. 7	Brisbane Broncos	14	3	0	0	12
183.	Brett Anderson	(Australia)	2007	Rd. 9	Parramatta Eels	1	1	0	0	4
184.	Sam Faust	(Australia)	2007–08	Rd. 10	Debut	23	0	0	0	0
185.	John Frith	(Australia)	2007	Rd. 11	Debut	1	0	0	0	0
186.	Matthew Bartlett	(Australia)	2007–08	Rd. 13	Melbourne Storm	19	3	0	0	12
187.	Travis Burns	(Australia)	2008–09	Rd. 1	Manly Warringah Sea Eagles	34	7	0	0	28
188.	Ben Harris	(Australia)	2008–10	Rd. 1	Bradford Bulls	41	8	0	0	32
189.	Obe Geia	(Australia)	2008	Rd. 2	Debut	2	0	0	0	0
190.	Dayne Weston	(Australia)	2008–09	Rd. 2	Cronulla-Sutherland Sharks	21	2	0	0	8
191.	Anthony Watts	(Australia)	2008–10	Rd. 4	Cronulla-Sutherland Sharks	47	8	0	0	32
192.	John Williams	(Australia)	2008–10	Rd. 4	Sydney Roosters	54	23	48	0	188
193.	Daniel Abraham	(Australia)	2008	Rd. 8	Newcastle Knights	6	1	0	0	4
194.	Nick Slyney	(Australia)	2008, 2010	Rd. 13	Debut	5	1	0	0	4
195.	Greg Byrnes	(Australia)	2008	Rd. 15	Debut	3	0	0	0	0
196.	Brandon Boor	(Australia)	2008	Rd. 16	Debut	2	0	0	0	0
197.	Sam Bowie	(Australia)	2008	Rd. 16	Debut	1	0	0	0	0
198.	Luke Harlen	(Australia)	2008	Rd. 19	Cronulla-Sutherland Sharks	5	0	0	0	0
199.	Shannon Hegarty	(Australia)	2009	Rd. 1	South Sydney Rabbitohs	5	2	0	0	8
200.	Antonio Kaufusi	(Tonga) (Australia)	2009–10	Rd. 1	Melbourne Storm	33	2	0	0	8
201.	Manase Manuokafoa	(Australia) (Tonga)	2009–10	Rd. 1	South Sydney Rabbitohs	16	0	0	0	0
202.	Willie Tonga	(Australia)	2009–11	Rd. 1	Canterbury-Bankstown Bulldogs	60	34	0	0	136
203.	Grant Rovelli	(Australia) (Italy)	2009–10	Rd. 2	New Zealand Warriors	26	1	0	0	4
204.	Steve Rapira	(New Zealand)	2009–10	Rd. 5	Debut	26	1	0	0	4
205.	James Tamou	(New Zealand) (Australia)	2009–16, 2023	Rd. 8	Debut	173	13	0	0	52
206.	Michael Bani	(Australia) (Papua New Guinea)	2009–11	Rd. 15	Manly Warringah Sea Eagles	21	8	0	0	32
207.	Donald Malone	(Australia)	2009	Rd. 22	Debut	2	1	0	0	4
208.	Ray Thompson	(Australia) (Papua New Guinea)	2009–17	Rd. 26	Debut	111	14	0	0	56
209.	Willie Mason	(Australia) (Tonga)	2010	Rd. 1	Sydney Roosters	23	1	0	0	4
210.	Leeson Ah Mau	(New Zealand) (Samoa)	2010–11	Rd. 4	New Zealand Warriors	33	2	0	0	8
211.	Shannon Gallant	(Australia)	2010	Rd. 4	Wests Tigers	9	2	0	0	8
212.	Will Tupou	(New Zealand)	2010–11	Rd. 4	Debut	21	7	0	0	28
213.	Isaak Ah Mau	(New Zealand) (Samoa)	2010–11	Rd. 7	Brisbane Broncos	5	0	0	0	0
214.	Dane Hogan	(Australia)	2010	Rd. 9	Debut	10	1	0	0	4
215.	Michael Morgan	(Australia)	2010–21	Rd. 9	Debut	168	58	0	5	237
216.	Arana Taumata	(New Zealand)	2010	Rd. 16	Canterbury-Bankstown Bulldogs	7	2	0	0	8
217.	Jason Taumalolo	(New Zealand) (Tonga)	2010–	Rd. 24	Debut	309	40	0	0	160
218.	Glenn Hall	(Australia)	2011–15	Rd. 1	Bradford Bulls	98	13	0	0	52
219.	Dallas Johnson	(Australia)	2011–13	Rd. 1	Catalans Dragons	65	2	0	0	8
220.	Ben Jones	(Australia)	2011	Rd. 1	Sydney Roosters	8	3	0	0	12
221.	Ashton Sims	(Australia) (Fiji)	2011–14	Rd. 1	Brisbane Broncos	91	2	0	0	8
222.	Tariq Sims	(Australia) (Fiji)	2011–14	Rd. 2	Debut	71	16	0	0	64
223.	Kalifa Faifai Loa	(New Zealand) (Samoa)	2011–13	Rd. 3	St George Illawarra Dragons	35	15	0	0	60
224.	James Segeyaro	(Papua New Guinea)	2011–12	Rd. 3	Debut	33	8	0	0	32
225.	Antonio Winterstein	(New Zealand) (Samoa)	2011–18	Rd. 5	Brisbane Broncos	167	78	0	0	312
226.	Joel Riethmuller	(Australia) (Italy)	2011–14	Rd. 14	Debut	31	1	0	0	4
227.	Cory Paterson	(Australia)	2011–12	Rd. 18	Newcastle Knights	10	4	0	0	16
228.	Brent Tate	(Australia)	2011–14	Rd. 19	New Zealand Warriors	67	28	0	0	112
229.	Kane Linnett	(Australia) (Scotland)	2012–18	Rd. 1	Sydney Roosters	164	53	0	0	108
230.	Robert Lui	(Australia)	2012–15	Rd. 1	Wests Tigers	46	13	5	0	62
231.	Mosese Pangai	(Australia)	2012	Rd. 1	Debut	1	0	0	0	0
232.	Ricky Thorby	(New Zealand)	2012–14	Rd. 5	St George Illawarra Dragons	24	0	0	0	0
233.	Anthony Mitchell	(Australia)	2012–14	Rd. 17	Sydney Roosters	16	1	0	0	4
234.	Blake Leary	(Australia)	2012–13, 2017	Rd. 25	Debut	5	0	0	0	0
235.	Rory Kostjasyn	(Australia) (Republic of Ireland)	2013–16	Rd. 1	Melbourne Storm	94	4	0	0	16
236.	Scott Moore	(England)	2013	Rd. 1	Huddersfield Giants	6	0	0	0	0
237.	Clint Greenshields	(Australia) (France)	2013	Rd. 6	Catalans Dragons	6	3	0	0	12
238.	Ethan Lowe	(Australia)	2013–18	Rd. 12	Debut	108	19	69	0	214
239.	Kyle Feldt	(Australia)	2013–24	Rd. 21	Debut	217	151	44	0	692
240.	Wayne Ulugia	(New Zealand) (Samoa)	2013	Rd. 24	Debut	4	6	0	0	24
241.	Jayden Hodges	(Australia)	2013	Rd. 25	Debut	3	0	0	0	0
242.	Matthew Wright	(New Zealand) (Samoa)	2014–15	Rd. 5	Cronulla-Sutherland Sharks	34	18	0	0	72
243.	Curtis Rona	(New Zealand)	2014	Rd. 7	Debut	7	6	0	0	24
244.	Cameron King	(Australia)	2014–15	Rd. 9	St George Illawarra Dragons	4	0	0	0	0
245.	John Asiata	(Australia)	2014–20	Rd. 12	Debut	127	4	0	0	16
246.	Tautau Moga	(Australia)	2014–16	Rd. 17	Sydney Roosters	18	3	0	0	12
247.	Sam Hoare	(Australia)	2014–18	Rd. 17	Debut	21	0	0	0	0
248.	Zac Santo	(Australia)	2014	Rd. 17	Debut	1	0	0	0	0
249.	Ben Spina	(Australia)	2014–17	Rd. 17	Debut	16	3	0	0	12
250.	Justin O'Neill	(Australia) (Vanuatu)	2015–21	Rd. 1	Melbourne Storm	122	44	0	0	176
251.	Jake Granville	(Australia)	2015–24	Rd. 1	Brisbane Broncos	207	22	0	0	88
252.	Ben Hannant	(Australia)	2015–16	Rd. 1	Brisbane Broncos	52	0	0	0	0
253.	Kelepi Tanginoa	(Australia)	2015	Rd. 2	Parramatta Eels	3	0	0	0	0
254.	Lachlan Coote	(Australia) (Scotland)	2015–18	Rd. 3	Penrith Panthers	83	15	0	4	64
255.	Patrick Kaufusi	(Australia) (Tonga)	2015–17	Rd. 16	Debut	22	0	0	0	0
256.	Coen Hess	(Australia)	2015–	Rd. 24	Debut	211	36	0	0	144
257.	Javid Bowen	(Australia)	2016–21	Rd. 5	Debut	45	13	0	0	52
258.	Jahrome Hughes	(New Zealand)	2016	Rd. 12	Gold Coast Titans	1	1	0	0	4
259.	Josh Chudleigh	(Australia)	2016	Rd. 18	Debut	1	1	0	0	4
260.	Kalyn Ponga	(Australia) (New Zealand)	2016–17	Finals Week 2	Debut	9	3	0	0	12
261.	Ben Hampton	(Australia)	2017–23	Rd. 1	Melbourne Storm	82	17	0	0	68
262.	Shaun Fensom	(Australia)	2017–18	Rd. 3	Canberra Raiders	35	2	0	0	8
263.	Gideon Gela-Mosby	(Australia)	2017–19	Rd. 4	Debut	11	6	0	0	24
264.	Corey Jensen	(Australia)	2017–21	Rd. 7	Debut	58	1	0	0	4
265.	Kyle Laybutt	(Australia)	2017	Rd. 15	Debut	2	0	0	0	0
266.	Te Maire Martin	(New Zealand)	2017–19	Rd. 17	Penrith Panthers	42	10	0	0	40
267.	Braden Hamlin-Uele	(New Zealand)	2017	Rd. 21	Debut	1	0	0	0	0
268.	Patrick Mago	(Australia) (New Zealand)	2017	Rd. 23	Debut	2	0	0	0	0
269.	Enari Tuala	(Australia) (Samoa)	2017–19	Rd. 24	Debut	18	2	0	0	8
270.	Shane Wright	(Australia)	2017–21	Rd. 24	Debut	41	3	0	0	12
271.	Jordan McLean	(Australia)	2018–25	Rd. 1	Melbourne Storm	156	6	0	0	24
272.	Francis Molo	(Australia) (Cook Islands)	2018–21	Rd. 11	Brisbane Broncos	70	6	0	0	24
273.	Mitchell Dunn	(Australia)	2018–23	Rd. 13	Debut	58	3	0	0	12
274.	Jake Clifford	(Australia)	2018–21, 2024–	Rd. 19	Debut	88	22	77	2	245
275.	Jordan Kahu	(New Zealand)	2019	Rd. 1	Brisbane Broncos	19	1	40	2	86
276.	Nene Macdonald	(Australia)	2019	Rd. 1	St George Illawarra Dragons	5	1	0	0	4
277.	Josh McGuire	(Australia)	2019–21	Rd. 1	Brisbane Broncos	38	0	0	0	0
278.	Tom Opacic	(Australia)	2019–20	Rd. 1	Brisbane Broncos	24	9	0	0	36
279.	Kurt Baptiste	(Papua New Guinea)	2019	Rd. 5	Sydney Roosters	9	0	0	0	0
280.	Reuben Cotter	(Australia)	2019–	Rd. 13	Debut	122	13	0	0	52
281.	Scott Drinkwater	(Australia)	2019–26	Rd. 15	Melbourne Storm	168	63	132	4	521
282.	Murray Taulagi	(New Zealand)	2019–26	Rd. 18	Debut	125	72	1	0	290
283.	Peter Hola	(New Zealand)	2019–21	Rd. 21	Debut	12	0	0	0	0
284.	Valentine Holmes	(Australia)	2020–24	Rd. 1	Cronulla-Sutherland Sharks	98	42	347	7	871
285.	Esan Marsters	(New Zealand)	2020–21	Rd. 1	Wests Tigers	15	2	0	0	8
286.	Reece Robson	(Australia)	2020–25	Rd. 1	St George Illawarra Dragons	131	25	0	0	100
287.	Tom Gilbert	(Australia)	2020–22	Rd. 4	Debut	47	3	0	0	12
288.	Hamiso Tabuai-Fidow	(Australia)	2020–22	Rd. 5	Debut	50	21	0	0	84
289.	Connelly Lemuelu	(New Zealand)	2020–22	Rd. 6	Debut	24	4	0	0	16
290.	Daejarn Asi	(New Zealand)	2020–22	Rd. 10	Debut	10	1	0	0	4
291.	Emry Pere	(New Zealand)	2020–22	Rd. 13	Debut	2	0	0	0	0
292.	Ben Condon	(Australia)	2020–22	Rd. 19	Debut	12	4	0	0	16
293.	Lachlan Burr	(Australia)	2021	Rd. 2	New Zealand Warriors	15	1	0	0	4
294.	Heilum Luki	(Australia)	2021–	Rd. 11	Debut	82	26	0	0	104
295.	Tom Dearden	(Australia)	2021–	Rd. 14	Brisbane Broncos	118	42	0	0	168
296.	Kane Bradley	(Australia)	2021	Rd. 19	Debut	2	1	0	0	4
297.	Jeremiah Nanai	(Australia)	2021–	Rd. 22	Debut	94	50	0	0	200
298.	Griffin Neame	(New Zealand)	2021–	Rd. 22	Debut	112	8	0	0	32
299.	Laitia Moceidreke	(Australia) (Fiji)	2021	Rd. 23	Debut	1	1	0	0	4
300.	Peta Hiku	(New Zealand)	2022–23	Rd. 1	New Zealand Warriors	43	6	0	0	24
301.	Jamayne Taunoa-Brown	(Australia)	2022–24	Rd. 1	St. George Illawarra Dragons	32	0	0	0	0
302.	Chad Townsend	(Australia)	2022–24	Rd. 1	New Zealand Warriors	70	7	10	9	57
303.	Brendan Elliot	(Australia)	2022–23	Rd. 13	Leigh Centurions	6	0	0	0	0
304.	Luciano Leilua	(Samoa)	2022–23	Rd. 16	Wests Tigers	20	5	0	0	20
305.	Tom Chester	(Australia)	2022–	Rd. 18	Debut	36	15	0	0	60
306.	Gehamat Shibasaki	(Australia)	2023	Rd. 3	Newcastle Knights	2	0	0	0	0
307.	Riley Price	(Australia)	2023	Rd. 5	Debut	2	0	0	0	0
308.	Jack Gosiewski	(Australia)	2023–24	Rd. 7	St. George Illawarra Dragons	12	2	0	0	8
309.	Kulikefu Finefeuiaki	(New Zealand)	2023–24	Rd. 10	Debut	37	5	0	0	20
310.	Robert Derby	(Papua New Guinea)	2023–	Rd. 13	Debut	20	9	0	0	36
311.	Zac Laybutt	(Australia)	2023–	Rd. 13	Debut	42	12	5	0	58
312.	Semi Valemei	(Fiji)	2023–25	Rd. 14	Canberra Raiders	17	14	0	0	56
313.	Sam McIntyre	(Australia)	2023–26	Rd. 16	Gold Coast Titans	60	5	0	0	20
314.	Thomas Mikaele	(New Zealand)	2024–	Rd. 8	Gold Coast Titans	43	0	0	0	0
315.	Viliami Vailea	(Tonga)	2024–26	Rd. 9	New Zealand Warriors	32	4	0	0	16
316.	Harrison Edwards	(Australia)	2024–26	Rd. 10	Canterbury-Bankstown Bulldogs	36	0	0	0	0
317.	Braidon Burns	(Australia)	2024–	Rd. 11	Canterbury-Bankstown Bulldogs	38	28	0	0	112
318.	Jaxon Purdue	(Australia)	2024–	Rd. 13	Debut	57	26	0	0	104
319.	Jamal Shibasaki	(Australia)	2024–25	Rd. 13	Debut	2	0	0	0	0
320.	Thomas Duffy	(Australia)	2025	Rd. 1	Debut	6	0	1	0	2
321.	John Bateman	(England)	2025–26	Rd. 1	Canberra Raiders	26	2	0	0	8
322.	Karl Lawton	(Australia)	2025	Rd. 1	Gold Coast Titans	11	0	0	0	0
323.	Kai O'Donnell	(Australia)	2025–26	Rd. 2	Canberra Raiders	25	0	0	0	0
324.	Jaxson Paulo	(New Zealand)	2025–26	Rd. 13	South Sydney Rabbitohs	3	2	0	0	8
325.	Kaiden Lahrs	(Australia)	2025–	Rd. 15	Debut	10	0	0	0	0
326.	Temple Kalepo	(New Zealand)	2025	Rd. 18	Debut	1	0	0	0	0
327.	Marly Bitungane	(Tanzania)	2025	Rd. 22	Debut	2	0	0	0	0
328.	Nic Lenaz	(Australia)	2025	Rd. 23	Debut	1	0	0	0	0
329.	Matthew Lodge	(Australia)	2026	Rd. 1	West Tigers	15	0	0	0	0
330.	Reed Mahoney	(Australia)	2026–	Rd. 1	Parramatta Eels	22	4	0	0	16
331.	Soni Luke	(Australia) (Tonga)	2026–	Rd. 2	Penrith Panthers	19	2	0	0	8
332.	Wiremu Greig	(New Zealand)	2026	Rd. 11	Parramatta Eels	3	0	0	0	0
333.	Liam Sutton	(Australia)	2026	Rd. 11	Debut	4	2	0	0	8
334.	Xavier Kerrisk	(Australia)	2026–	Rd. 12	Debut	1	0	0	0	0
335.	Ethan King	(Australia)	2026–	Rd. 13	Sydney Roosters	5	0	0	0	0

=== Women's ===
Cap no.	Name	Nationality	Cowboys career	Debut round	Previous club	App.	Tries	Goals	FGs	Points
1.	Kirra Dibb	(Australia)	2023–25	Rd. 1	Newcastle Knights	27	4	58	2	134
2.	Tallisha Harden	(Australia)	2023–	Rd. 1	Brisbane Broncos	31	0	0	0	0
3.	Fran Goldthorp	(England)	2023–	Rd. 1	Leeds Rhinos	30	11	0	0	44
4.	China Polata	(Australia) (Tonga)	2023–25	Rd. 1	Brisbane Broncos	17	3	0	0	12
5.	Jasmine Peters	(Australia)	2023–	Rd. 1	Gold Coast Titans	32	12	0	0	48
6.	Shellie Long	(Papua New Guinea)	2023–24	Rd. 1	Debut	11	1	0	0	4
7.	Mia Middleton	(Australia)	2023	Rd. 1	Debut	4	0	0	0	0
8.	Krystal Blackwell	(Australia)	2023–25	Rd. 1	Debut	27	7	0	0	28
9.	Sareka Mooka	(Australia)	2023–24	Rd. 1	Debut	12	1	0	0	4
10.	Emma Manzelmann	(Australia)	2023–	Rd. 1	Newcastle Knights	32	7	5	0	38
11.	Makenzie Weale	(Australia)	2023–	Rd. 1	Newcastle Knights	22	3	0	0	12
12.	Shaniah Power	(Australia)	2023–24	Rd. 1	Sydney Roosters	10	0	0	0	0
13.	Bree Chester	(Australia)	2023–	Rd. 1	Debut	31	4	0	0	16
14.	Tiana Raftstrand-Smith	(Australia) (New Zealand)	2023–	Rd. 1	Gold Coast Titans	20	6	0	0	24
15.	Sera Koroi	(Papua New Guinea)	2023	Rd. 1	Debut	8	0	0	0	0
16.	April Ngatupuna	(New Zealand) (Cook Islands)	2023	Rd. 1	Gold Coast Titans	8	1	0	0	4
17.	Vitalina Naikore	(Fiji)	2023–24	Rd. 1	Debut	11	5	0	0	20
18.	Jetaya Faifua	(Australia)	2023–24	Rd. 2	Gold Coast Titans	11	3	0	0	12
19.	Autumn-Rain Stephens-Daly	(New Zealand)	2023	Rd. 3	Newcastle Knights	3	0	0	0	0
20.	Tahlulah Tillett	(Australia)	2023–25	Rd. 4	Newcastle Knights	23	0	0	0	0
21.	Essay Banu	(Australia) (Papua New Guinea)	2023–	Rd. 4	Debut	22	0	0	0	0
22.	Jessikah Reeves	(Australia) (Papua New Guinea)	2023	Rd. 4	Debut	5	0	0	0	0
23.	Libby Surha	(Australia)	2023–24	Rd. 6	Debut	5	1	0	0	4
24.	Lily Peacock	(Australia)	2023–	Rd. 7	Debut	23	2	0	0	8
25.	Alisha Foord	(Australia)	2023–	Rd. 9	Debut	16	2	0	0	8
26.	Merewalesi Rokouono	(Fiji)	2023	Rd. 9	Debut	1	0	0	0	0
27.	Jakiya Whitfeld	(Australia)	2024–	Rd. 1	Wests Tigers	18	10	0	0	40
28.	Harata Butler	(New Zealand)	2024	Rd. 1	Cronulla-Sutherland Sharks	4	0	0	0	0
29.	Ebony Raftstrand-Smith	(Australia) (New Zealand)	2024–	Rd. 2	Debut	3	0	0	0	0
30.	Lillian Yarrow	(Australia)	2024–25	Rd. 3	Debut	15	1	0	0	4
31.	Lavinia Tauhalaliku	(Tonga)	2024	Rd. 6	Debut	4	1	0	0	4
32.	Jazmon Tupou-Witchman	(New Zealand) (Cook Islands)	2024	Rd. 8	Cronulla-Sutherland Sharks	1	0	0	0	0
33.	Abigail Roache	(New Zealand)	2025–	Rd. 1	Newcastle Knights	12	3	0	0	12
34.	Rosie Kelly	(New Zealand)	2025–	Rd. 1	Parramatta Eels	9	1	2	0	8
35.	Hailee-Jay Ormond-Maunsell	(New Zealand)	2025–	Rd. 1	Gold Coast Titans	12	0	0	0	0
36.	Najvada George	(New Zealand)	2025	Rd. 1	Wests Tigers	4	0	0	0	0
37.	Lily Dick	(Australia)	2025–	Rd. 2	Debut	5	0	0	0	0
38.	Ana Malupo	(Australia) (Tonga)	2025	Rd. 3	Debut	3	0	0	0	0
39.	Tafao Asaua	(New Zealand) (Samoa)	2025–	Rd. 7	Parramatta Eels	2	0	0	0	0
40.	Tallara Bamblett	(Australia)	2026–	Rd. 1	Debut	2	0	0	0	0
41.	Margot Vella	(Australia)	2026–	Rd. 1	St George Illawarra	2	1	0	0	4
42.	Sian Williams	(Australia)	2026–	Rd. 1	Debut	1	0	0	0	0
43.	Lydia Turua-Quedley	(Cook Islands) (New Zealand)	2026–	Rd. 1	New Zealand Warriors	2	0	0	0	0
44.	Tayla Curtis	(Australia)	2026–	Rd. 1	Debut	2	0	0	0	0
45.	Emily Veivers	(Papua New Guinea) (Australia)	2026–	Rd. 1	Wigan Warriors	2	0	0	0	0
46.	Haylee Hifo	(Tonga) (Australia)	2026–	Rd. 2	Wigan Warriors	1	1	0	0	4

== See also ==
- List of North Queensland Cowboys records
- List of North Queensland Cowboys honours
- List of North Queensland Cowboys seasons
