= 1998 North Queensland Cowboys season =

Coordinates: 19°18′58″S 146°42′43″E

- NRL Rank: 16th
- Play-off result: Missed finals
- 1998 record: Wins: 9; draws: 0; losses: 15
- Points scored: For: 361; against: 556

Team information
- Coach: Tim Sheens
- Captain: John Lomax
- Stadium: Malanda Stadium
- Avg. attendance: 17,034
- High attendance: 30,250 (vs. Brisbane Broncos, Round 22)

Top scorers
- Tries: Josh Hannay (15)
- Goals: Josh Hannay (29)
- Points: Josh Hannay (118)
← 1997	1999 →

The 1998 North Queensland Cowboys season was the 4th in the club's history. Coached by Tim Sheens and captained by John Lomax, they competed in the inaugural season of the newly formed National Rugby League (NRL) competition.

== Season summary ==
After a disappointing 1997 season, the Cowboys entered the newly unified National Rugby League competition with high hopes. While the squad from a year earlier was kept mostly the same, the club added former Australia and Queensland representative and local favourite Dale Shearer, veteran forward Dale Fritz from the recently folded Perth Reds and former Canberra Raiders flyer Noa Nadruku, who reunited with coach Tim Sheens.

The year got off to the best start possible, as the club went on a four-game winning streak, the first time they'd won three and four games in a row. They then bounced back from a big loss to Brisbane in Round 5, with a 17-4 win over Newcastle. After six rounds, the club sat in equal 1st on 10 competition points and a maiden finals appearance looked to be a real possibility.

It turned out to be false dawn, as a five-game losing streak followed. The club would then make history in Round 12, defeating the Penrith Panthers 36-28, after trailing 26-0 at half time. As of 2019, this still stands as the biggest comeback victory in Australian first grade history. They followed that up with another milestone, recording 40 points in a game for the first time, defeating the Western Suburbs Magpies 40-10. Over the last 10 rounds, the club would win just two games, finishing in 16th place after such a promising start to the season. The club's lone representative in 1998, New Zealand's John Lomax, was named Player of the Year and Players' Player.

The club blooded two talented 18-year-olds during the season, Moranbah's Josh Hannay and Mt Isa's Scott Prince. Hannay, whose planned debut in 1996 as a 16-year-old was vetoed by the ARL, played 21 games and was the club's top try and point scorer. He went onto set numerous point scoring records for the club, playing 150 games over nine seasons, and representing Queensland on two occasions. Prince, a Junior Kangaroo in 1998, played 16 games (10 of those off the bench) and would play 53 games over three seasons before joining the Cowboys' arch-rivals, the Brisbane Broncos, in 2001. In 2005, he guided the Wests Tigers to their maiden premiership, defeating the Cowboys in the Grand Final.

=== Milestones ===
- Round 1: Dale Fritz, Noa Nadruku, Dale Shearer and Scott Wilson made their debuts for the club.
- Round 2: Ray Mercy became the first player to score four tries in a match for the club.
- Round 3: Josh Hannay made his NRL debut.
- Round 3: The club won three games in a row for the first time.
- Round 4: Scott Prince made his NRL debut.
- Round 4: The club won four games in a row for the first time.
- Round 12: The club overcame a 26-0 half time deficit to defeat Penrith 36-28 (Biggest comeback in NSWRL/ARL/NRL history).
- Round 13: The club scored 40 points in a game for the first time.
- Round 14: Paul Pensini made his NRL debut.
- Round 19: Scott Donald made his NRL debut.
- Round 20: John Malu made his NRL debut.
- Round 21: Andrew Dunemann played his 50th game for the club, the first player to do so.
- Round 23: Scott Whiting made his NRL debut.
- Round 24: Denny Lambert made his NRL debut.

== Squad list ==
North Queensland Cowboys NRL Squad 1998
First team squad			Coaching staff
Jimmy Ahmat – FB; Paul Bowman – CE; John Buttigieg – PR; Michael Coorey – SR; Owen Cunningham – SR; Jason Death – LK; Scott Donald – WG; John Doyle – HB; Andrew Dunemann – FE; Jason Ferris – HB; Dale Fritz – LK; Josh Hannay – CE	Liam Johnson – SR; Peter Jones – SR; Denny Lambert – HB; Martin Locke – PR; John Lomax (c) – PR; Scott Mahon – FB; John Malu – WG; Ray Mercy – CE; Leigh McWilliams – HK; Glen Murphy – SR; Noa Nadruku – CE; Paul Pensini – PR	Scott Prince – FE; Ian Roberts – PR; Luke Scott – SR; Dale Shearer – FB; Mark Shipway – SR; Bert Tabuai – LK; Kris Tassell – WG; Steve Walters – HK; Kyle Warren – SR; Adam Warwick – WG; Scott Whiting – CE; Scott Wilson – FB	Head coach: Tim Sheens; Assistant coaches: Mark Graham (assistant coach); Murray Hurst (assistant coach); Legend: (c) Captain(s); (vc) Vice-captain(s)

== Squad movement ==
=== 1998 Gains ===
Player	Signed from
Dale Fritz	Perth Reds
Leigh McWilliams	Hunter Mariners
Noa Nadruku	Canberra Raiders
Dale Shearer	Sydney City Roosters
Scott Wilson	Perth Reds

=== 1998 Losses ===
Player	Signed To
Dion Cope	Released
Reggie Cressbrook	Townsville Stingers
Ian Dunemann	Townsville Stingers
Aaron Ketchell	Released
Justin Loomans	South Sydney Rabbitohs
Marshall Miller	Wests Tigers Mackay
Luke Phillips	Manly Sea Eagles
John Skardon	Released
Shane Vincent	Released
Scott Wilson	Canterbury Bulldogs (mid-season)

== Ladder ==
1998 NRL season
Pos	Team	Pld	W	D	L	PF	PA	PD	Pts
1	Brisbane Broncos (P)	24	18	1	5	688	310	+378	37
2	Newcastle Knights	24	18	1	5	562	381	+181	37
3	Melbourne Storm	24	17	1	6	546	372	+174	35
4	Parramatta Eels	24	17	1	6	468	349	+119	35
5	North Sydney Bears	24	17	0	7	663	367	+296	34
6	Sydney City Roosters	24	16	0	8	680	383	+297	32
7	Canberra Raiders	24	15	0	9	564	429	+135	30
8	St. George Dragons	24	13	1	10	486	490	−4	27
9	Canterbury-Bankstown Bulldogs	24	13	0	11	489	411	+78	26
10	Manly Warringah Sea Eagles	24	13	0	11	503	473	+30	26
11	Cronulla-Sutherland Sharks	24	12	1	11	438	387	+51	25
12	Illawarra Steelers	24	11	1	12	476	539	−63	23
13	Balmain Tigers	24	9	1	14	381	463	−82	19
14	Penrith Panthers	24	8	2	14	525	580	−55	18
15	Auckland Warriors	24	9	0	15	417	518	−101	18
16	North Queensland Cowboys	24	9	0	15	361	556	−195	18
17	Adelaide Rams	24	7	0	17	393	615	−222	14
18	South Sydney Rabbitohs	24	5	0	19	339	560	−221	10
19	Gold Coast Chargers	24	4	0	20	289	654	−365	8
20	Western Suburbs Magpies	24	4	0	20	371	802	−431	8

(P) Premiers

== Fixtures ==
=== Regular season ===
Date	Round	Opponent	Venue	Score	Tries	Goals	Attendance
13 March	Round 1	Adelaide Rams	Adelaide Rams	18 – 8	Nadruku, Shearer, Walters	Ferris (3/5)	11,289
21 March	Round 2	Balmain Tigers	Malanda Stadium	26 – 2	Mercy (4), Tassell	Dunemann (2/3), Ferris (1/5)	18,399
29 March	Round 3	Parramatta Eels	Parramatta Stadium	16 – 15	Bowman, Hannay, Tassell	Ferris (1/2, 2 FG), Hannay (0/1)	10,177
4 April	Round 4	Canberra Raiders	Malanda Stadium	14 – 12	Murphy, Nadruku	Doyle (1/2), Ferris (1/1), Hannay (1/1)	20,048
12 April	Round 5	Brisbane Broncos	ANZ Stadium	4 – 58	Hannay	Hannay (0/1)	20,904
18 April	Round 6	Newcastle Knights	Malanda Stadium	17 – 4	Warren (2), Hannay	Hannay (2/5), Dunemann (1 FG)	18,428
25 April	Round 7	Sydney City Roosters	Malanda Stadium	16 – 50	Mercy, Tassell, Warren	Hannay (2/3)	21,027
2 May	Round 8	Cronulla Sharks	Shark Park	8 – 16	Hannay, Roberts	Hannay (0/2)	5,978
9 May	Round 9	Canterbury Bulldogs	Malanda Stadium	18 – 24	Ahmat, Hannay, Mahon, Mercy	Doyle (1/3), Hannay (0/2)	15,288
17 May	Round 10	Canberra Raiders	Bruce Stadium	12 – 50	Cunningham, Tassell	Hannay (2/2)	8,291
23 May	Round 11	Parramatta Eels	Malanda Stadium	12 – 29	Hannay, Tassell	Hannay (2/3)	17,361
29 May	Round 12	Penrith Panthers	Penrith Panthers	36 – 28	Nadruku (3), Dunemann (2), Mercy, Shipway	Hannay (4/7)	8,685
6 June	Round 13	Western Suburbs Magpies	Malanda Stadium	40 – 10	Nadruku (2), Ferris, Mercy, Prince, Tassell, Warren, Warwick	Shearer (2/2), Dunemann (1/1), Ferris (1/4), Warren (0/1)	10,628
14 June	Round 14	St George Dragons	Kogarah Oval	14 – 16	Mercy (2), Hannay	Hannay (1/3)	9,486
20 June	Round 15	Melbourne Storm	Malanda Stadium	8 – 10	Mercy	Hannay (2/3)	24,464
28 June	Round 16	Illawarra Steelers	WIN Stadium	18 – 24	Hannay (2), Nadruku, Tabuai	Hannay (1/4)	6,558
4 July	Round 17	Gold Coast Chargers	Malanda Stadium	14 – 4	Hannay, Shearer	Hannay (3/4)	7,127
11 July	Round 18	Balmain Tigers	Leichhardt Oval	0 – 18			10,653
18 July	Round 19	Adelaide Rams	Malanda Stadium	14 – 10	Hannay, Locke	Hannay (3/4)	11,340
25 July	Round 20	South Sydney Rabbitohs	Malanda Stadium	16 – 22	Dunemann, Nadruku, Walters	Hannay (2/3)	10,409
31 July	Round 21	Auckland Warriors	Ericsson Stadium	18 – 34	Hannay, Mercy, Shipway	Hannay (3/4)	4,500
8 August	Round 22	Brisbane Broncos	Malanda Stadium	10 – 22	Nadruku (2)	Hannay (1/3)	30,250
16 August	Round 23	Manly Sea Eagles	Brookvale Oval	12 – 28	Hannay (3)	Hannay (0/3)	8,422
23 August	Round 24	North Sydney Bears	North Sydney Oval	0 – 62			15,604
Legend: Win Loss Draw Bye

== Statistics ==
Name	App	T	G	FG	Pts
Jimmy Ahmat	2	1	-	-	4
Paul Bowman	6	1	-	-	4
John Buttigieg	9	-	-	-	-
Michael Coorey	7	-	-	-	-
Owen Cunningham	23	1	-	-	4
Jason Death	17	-	-	-	-
Scott Donald	1	-	-	-	-
John Doyle	8	-	2	-	4
Andrew Dunemann	21	3	3	1	19
Jason Ferris	19	1	7	2	20
Dale Fritz	21	-	-	-	-
Josh Hannay	21	15	29	-	118
Liam Johnson	2	-	-	-	-
Denny Lambert	1	-	-	-	-
Martin Locke	17	1	-	-	4
John Lomax	21	-	-	-	-
Scott Mahon	4	1	-	-	4
John Malu	2	-	-	-	-
Ray Mercy	24	12	-	-	48
Glen Murphy	9	1	-	-	4
Noa Nadruku	22	11	-	-	44
Paul Pensini	6	-	-	-	-
Scott Prince	16	1	-	-	4
Ian Roberts	12	1	-	-	4
Luke Scott	10	-	-	-	-
Dale Shearer	13	2	2	-	12
Mark Shipway	19	2	-	-	8
Bert Tabuai	5	1	-	-	4
Kris Tassell	18	6	-	-	24
Steve Walters	22	2	-	-	8
Kyle Warren	20	4	-	-	16
Adam Warwick	7	1	-	-	4
Scott Whiting	1	-	-	-	-
Scott Wilson	2	-	-	-	-
Totals		68	43	3	361

== Representatives ==
The following players played a representative match in 1998.

	Anzac Test
John Lomax	New Zealand

== Feeder Clubs ==
=== Queensland Cup ===
- Townsville Stingers - 7th, missed finals

== Honours ==
=== Club ===
- Player of the Year: John Lomax
- Players' Player: John Lomax
- Club Person of the Year: Scott Mahon
