= 1997 North Queensland Cowboys season =

3rd season in the club history

Coordinates: 19°18′58″S 146°42′43″E

- Super League Rank: 10th
- Play-off result: Missed finals
- 1997 record: Wins: 5; draws: 2; losses: 11
- Points scored: For: 328; against: 452

Team information
- Coach: Tim Sheens
- Captain: Ian Roberts
- Stadium: Stockland Stadium
- Avg. attendance: 17,539
- High attendance: 30,122 (vs. Brisbane Broncos, Rd 6)

Top scorers
- Tries: Luke Phillips (8)
- Goals: Luke Phillips (45)
- Points: Luke Phillips (122)
← 1996	1998 →

The 1997 North Queensland Cowboys season was the 3rd in the club's history. Coached by Tim Sheens and captained by Ian Roberts, they competed in the breakaway News Limited-run competition, the Telstra Cup.

== Season summary ==
After an improved 1996 season, the club pulled off a major coup in signing three-time premiership winning coach Tim Sheens from the Canberra Raiders, who brought five players with him from his old club, including Australia and Queensland representative hooker Steve Walters. Former Australia and New South Wales prop Ian Roberts was brought in as captain as part of a major off-season rebuild in which 20 players were let go, including a number of foundation players.

The club, who were competing in News Limited's breakaway Super League competition, got off to a promising start after defeating the newly formed Adelaide Rams in the opening round of the season. The good times under Sheens and his new signings were short lived, as a four game losing streak followed. A win over the Auckland Warriors in Round 9 was followed by two consecutive draws, which included a 20-all draw against arch-rivals Brisbane, their best ever result against them at the time.

Back-to-back wins in Round 14 and 15 had the Cowboys sitting just four points outside the Top 5, but a three-game losing streak to end the season left the club languishing in last place. The Cowboys recorded their second wooden spoon in three seasons, with just five wins from 18 games. Despite the disappointing year, Tim Sheens signed a five-year contract renewal with the club. Owen Cunningham, an off-season recruit from Manly, was named the club's Player of the Year.

Towards the end of the season, the club took part in the World Club Championship. The tournament featured all 22 clubs from the Australasian and Super League competitions and was contested over six rounds in two hemispheres. The Cowboys played home and away games against three Super League clubs; (Leeds Rhinos, Oldham Bears and Salford Reds), winning all but once (a 16-20 loss to Oldham at Boundary Park). Despite the great results, the Cowboys missed out on the finals, while clubs in other pools got through without even winning a game. It would be the last time the club would face a Super League side or play a game in England until the 2016 World Club Challenge.

=== Milestones ===
- Round 1: Dion Cope, Owen Cunningham, Jason Ferris, John Lomax, Scott Mahon, Ray Mercy, Luke Phillips, Ian Roberts, Tyran Smith, Bert Tabuai and Steve Walters made their debuts for the club.
- Round 1: Kyle Warren made his first grade debut.
- Round 2: Jimmy Ahmat and Mark Shipway made their first grade debuts.
- Round 4: John Doyle made his first grade debut.
- Round 6: Luke Scott made his first grade debut.
- Round 7: Jason Ryan made his debut for the club.
- Round 7: Adam Warwick made his first grade debut.
- Round 11: Shane Vincent made his debut for the club.
- Round 14: Ray Mercy became the first player to score three tries in a match for the club.

== Squad list ==
In Super League, players were able to choose their own jersey number (regardless of their starting position), which they wore for the entire season.

North Queensland Cowboys Super League Squad 1997
First team squad			Coaching staff
38 Jimmy Ahmat – WG; 3 Paul Bowman – CE; 15 John Buttigieg – PR; – Michael Coorey – SR; 25 Dion Cope – CE; 14 Reggie Cressbrook – FB; 13 Owen Cunningham – SR; 9 Jason Death – HK; 24 John Doyle – FE; 6 Andrew Dunemann – HB; 23 Ian Dunemann – FE; 7 Jason Ferris – HB	9 Paul Galea – SR; – Liam Johnson – SR; 21 Peter Jones – SR; – Aaron Ketchell – PR; 10 Martin Locke – PR; 8 John Lomax – PR; 5 Justin Loomans – WG; 22 Scott Mahon – FB; 34 Ray Mercy – CE; 32 Marshall Miller – WG; 27 Glen Murphy – SR; 28 Luke Phillips – WG	31 Ian Roberts (c) – PR; 4 Jason Ryan – SR; 17 Luke Scott – SR; 20 Mark Shipway – CE; 35 John Skardon – HK; 12 Tyran Smith – SR; 30 Bert Tabuai – CE; 2 Kris Tassell – WG; 41 Shane Vincent – CE; 49 Steve Walters – HK; 1 Kyle Warren – LK; 16 Adam Warwick – WG	Head coach: Tim Sheens; Assistant coach: Mark Graham (assistant coach); Legend: (c) Captain(s); (vc) Vice-captain(s)

== Squad movement ==
=== 1997 Gains ===
Player	Signed from
Dion Cope	Cronulla Sharks
Owen Cunningham	Manly Sea Eagles
Jason Ferris	Canberra Raiders
John Lomax	Canberra Raiders
Scott Mahon	Parramatta Eels
Ray Mercy	Atherton Roosters
Luke Phillips	Canberra Raiders
Ian Roberts	Manly Sea Eagles
Jason Ryan	South Sydney Rabbitohs
Tyran Smith	South Sydney Rabbitohs
Bert Tabuai	Canberra Raiders
Shane Vincent	South Sydney Rabbitohs
Steve Walters	Canberra Raiders

=== 1997 Losses ===
Player	Signed To
David Bouveng	Halifax Blue Sox
Steve Edmed	Sheffield Eagles
Damian Gibson	Leeds Rhinos
Shane Howarth	Auckland Blues
Jason Martin	Paris Saint-Germain
Jamie Mathiou	Leeds Rhinos
Willie Morganson	Sheffield Eagles
Willie Poching	Hunter Mariners
Dean Schifilliti	Adelaide Rams
Wayne Sing	Paris Saint-Germain
Tyran Smith	Hunter Mariners (mid-season)
Whetu Taewa	Sheffield Eagles
Adrian Vowles	Castleford Tigers

== Ladder ==
Pos	Team	Pld	W	D	L	PF	PA	PD	Pts
1	Brisbane Broncos (P)	18	14	1	3	481	283	+198	29
2	Cronulla Sharks	18	12	0	6	403	230	+173	24
3	Canberra Raiders	18	11	0	7	436	337	+99	22
4	Canterbury Bulldogs	18	10	0	8	453	447	+6	20
5	Penrith Panthers	18	9	0	9	431	462	-31	18
6	Hunter Mariners	18	7	0	11	350	363	-13	14
7	Auckland Warriors	18	7	0	11	332	406	-74	14
8	Perth Reds	18	7	0	11	321	456	-135	14
9	Adelaide Rams	18	6	1	11	303	402	-99	13
10	North Queensland Cowboys	18	5	2	11	328	452	-124	12

- (P) - Premiers

== Fixtures ==
=== Regular season ===
Date	Round	Opponent	Venue	Score	Tries	Goals	Attendance
1 March	Round 1	Adelaide Rams	Stockland Stadium	24 – 16	Walters (2), Phillips, Smith	Phillips (4/5)	17,738
7 March	Round 2	Perth Reds	Stockland Stadium	20 – 22	Ahmat, Ferris, Roberts	Phillips (4/5)	15,745
15 March	Round 3	Penrith Panthers	Stockland Stadium	12 – 19	Phillips, Warren	Phillips (2/3)	18,003
22 March	Round 4	Hunter Mariners	Topper Stadium	10 – 38	Phillips, Warren	Phillips (1/3)	6,090
31 March	Round 5	Canterbury Bulldogs	Belmore Oval	16 – 14	Bowman, Mahon, Shipway	Phillips (2/3)	9,830
5 April	Round 6	Brisbane Broncos	Stockland Stadium	16 – 42	Death (2), Cressbrook	Doyle (2/2), Phillips (0/1)	30,122
12 April	Round 7	Perth Reds	WACA	4 – 6		Doyle (2/2)	9,701
20 April	Round 8	Canberra Raiders	Bruce Stadium	16 – 40	Phillips, Walters, Warren	Phillips (2/3)	10,071
27 April	Round 9	Auckland Warriors	Stockland Stadium	30 – 22	Cressbrook, Jones, Phillips, Scott, Walters	Phillips (5/6)	12,464
2 May	Round 10	Adelaide Rams	Adelaide Oval	14 – 14	Cressbrook, I. Dunemann, Shipway	Phillips (1/4)	15,970
25 May	Round 11	Brisbane Broncos	ANZ Stadium	20 – 20	A. Dunemann, I. Dunemann, Shipway	Phillips (4/5)	14,167
31 May	Round 12	Cronulla Sharks	Stockland Stadium	10 – 24	Mahon (2)	Phillips (1/3)	16,095
28 June	Round 13	Canterbury Bulldogs	Stockland Stadium	22 – 29	Roberts, Tassell, Warren, Warwick	Phillips (3/6)	14,176
4 July	Round 14	Penrith Panthers	Penrith Stadium	33 – 26	Mercy (3), Phillips (2), Loomans	Phillips (4/7), A. Dunemann (1 FG)	5,335
13 July	Round 15	Hunter Mariners	Stockland Stadium	33 – 14	A. Dunemann (2), Mercy (2), Loomans, Murphy	Phillips (4/7), A. Dunemann (1 FG)	11,480
9 August	Round 16	Canberra Raiders	Stockland Stadium	14 – 22	Bowman, Lomax	Phillips (3/3)	22,026
16 August	Round 17	Cronulla Sharks	Shark Park	12 – 34	Phillips, Scott	Phillips (2/3)	11,640
24 August	Round 18	Auckland Warriors	Ericsson Stadium	22 – 50	Mercy, Scott, Skardon, Warren	Phillips (3/4)	12,000
Legend: Win Loss Draw Bye

=== World Club Championship ===
The World Club Championship was a mid-season tournament featuring all 22 clubs from the Australasian and Super League competitions. It was contested over six rounds in two hemispheres from 6 June to 11 October.

==== Pool Play ====
Club	Played	Won	Lost	Drawn	For	Against	Diff.	Points
Hunter Mariners	6	6	0	0	226	50	176	12
North Queensland Cowboys	6	5	1	0	228	92	136	10
Adelaide Rams	6	4	2	0	170	68	102	8
Perth Reds	6	4	2	0	148	104	44	8

Date	Round	Opponent	Venue	Score	Tries	Goals	Attendance
7 June	Round 1	Leeds Rhinos	Stockland Stadium	42 – 20	Murphy (2), Cressbrook, Jones, Phillips, Shipway, Tabuai, Warwick	Phillips (5/8)	14,561
14 June	Round 2	Oldham Bears	Stockland Stadium	54 – 16	Cressbrook (2), Vincent (2), Walters (2), A. Dunemann, Murphy, Phillips, Shipway	Phillips (7/10)	12,600
21 June	Round 3	Salford Reds	Stockland Stadium	44 – 8	Warwick (2), Bowman, Cressbrook, Cunningham, I. Dunemann, Shipway, Tabuai	Phillips (6/8)	15,508
18 July	Round 4	Oldham Bears	Boundary Park	20 – 16	Bowman, Mercy, Phillips	Phillips (2/3)	2,691
27 July	Round 5	Salford Reds	The Willows	24 – 14	Cunningham, Murphy, Phillips, Skardon	Phillips (4/4)	7,448
3 August	Round 6	Leeds Rhinos	Headingley Stadium	48 – 14	A. Dunemann (2), Phillips (2), Cressbrook, Mercy, Murphy, Shipway	Phillips (8/8)	12,224
Legend: Win Loss Draw Bye

== Statistics ==
Name	App	T	G	FG	Pts
Jimmy Ahmat	2	1	-	-	4
Paul Bowman	10	2	-	-	8
John Buttigieg	5	-	-	-	-
Dion Cope	7	-	-	-	-
Reggie Cressbrook	11	3	-	-	12
Owen Cunningham	18	-	-	-	-
Jason Death	20	3	-	-	12
John Doyle	12	-	4	-	8
Andrew Dunemann	14	3	-	2	14
Ian Dunemann	6	2	-	-	8
Jason Ferris	7	1	-	-	4
Paul Galea	1	-	-	-	-
Peter Jones	15	1	-	-	4
Aaron Ketchell	3	-	-	-	-
Martin Locke	11	-	-	-	-
John Lomax	15	1	-	-	4
Justin Loomans	7	2	-	-	8
Scott Mahon	14	3	-	-	12
Ray Mercy	6	6	-	-	24
Marshall Miller	1	-	-	-	-
Glen Murphy	11	1	-	-	4
Luke Phillips	17	8	45	-	122
Ian Roberts	17	2	-	-	8
Jason Ryan	1	-	-	-	-
Luke Scott	12	3	-	-	12
Mark Shipway	13	3	-	-	12
John Skardon	3	1	-	-	4
Tyran Smith	9	1	-	-	4
Bert Tabuai	5	-	-	-	-
Kris Tassell	3	1	-	-	4
Shane Vincent	2	-	-	-	-
Steve Walters	15	4	-	-	16
Kyle Warren	14	5	-	-	20
Adam Warwick	6	1	-	-	4
Totals		57	49	2	328

== Representatives ==
The following players played a representative match in 1997.

	Anzac Test	Super League Tri-series	End of Year Test	SL Test Series
Owen Cunningham	-	Queensland	-	-
John Lomax	-	-	New Zealand	-
Ian Roberts	-	New South Wales	-	-
Tyran Smith	New Zealand	New Zealand	-	-
Steve Walters	-	Queensland	-	Australia

== Honours ==
=== Club ===
- Player of the Year: Owen Cunningham
- Players' Player: John Lomax
- Club Person of the Year: Ian Roberts
