= Arthur Miller-Stephen =

Australian rugby league player

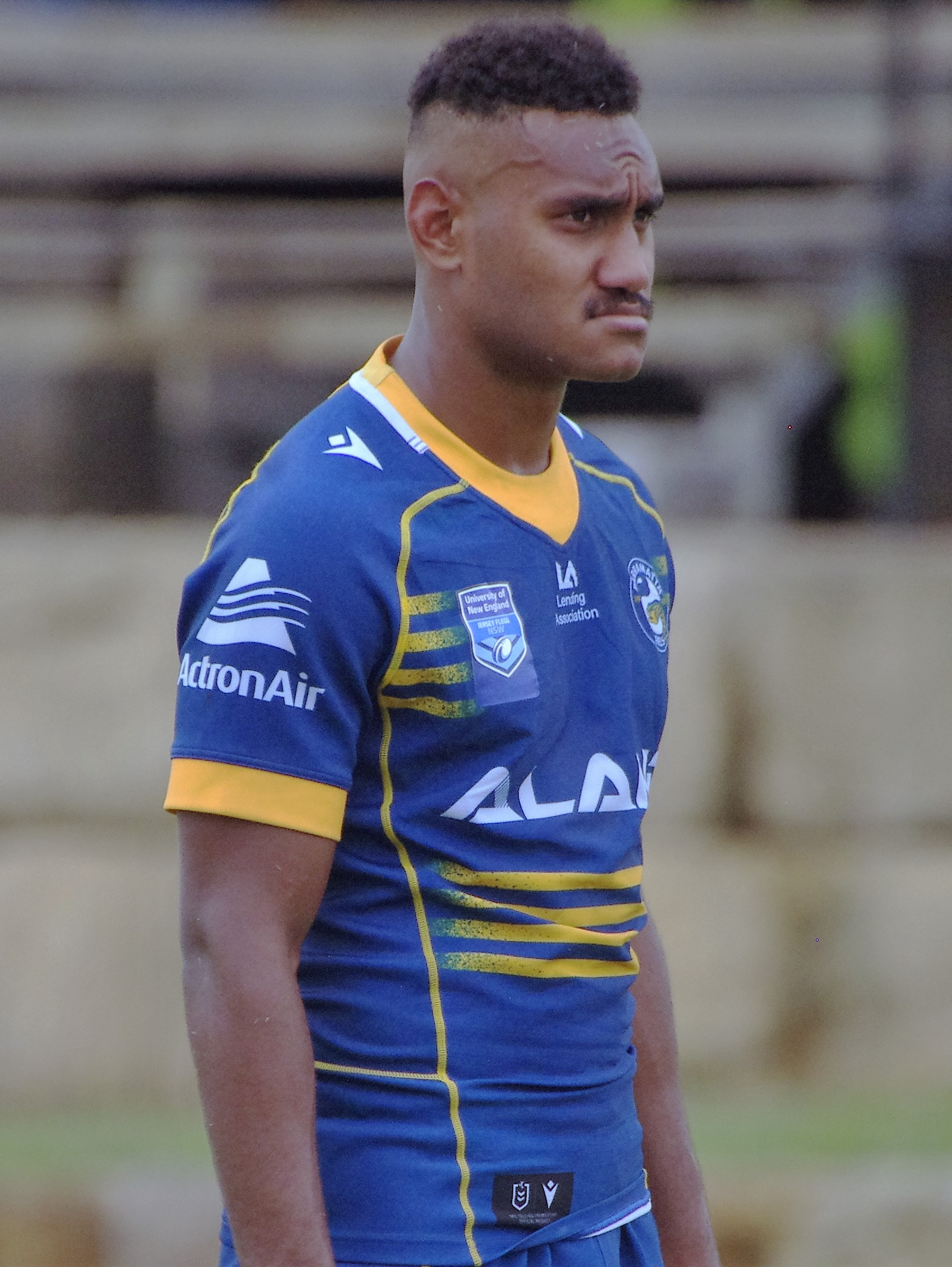

Personal information
- Full name: Arthur Miller-Stephen
- Born: 10 May 2003 (age 23) Mackay, Queensland, Australia
- Height: 185 cm (6 ft 1 in)
- Weight: 96 kg (15 st 2 lb)

Playing information
- Position: Wing
Club
Years	Team	Pld	T	G	FG	P
2023–	Parramatta Eels	1	1	0	0	4
- Source: As of 16 November 2026
- Education: Mackay State High School
- Relatives: Marshall Miller (uncle)

Arthur Miller-Stephen (born 2003) is an Australian professional rugby league footballer who plays as a winger for the Parramatta Eels in the National Rugby League and NSW Cup.

== Background ==
He is the nephew to former rugby league player Marshall Miller.

=== Mackay Cutters ===
Miller-Stephen grew up in Mackay, Queensland playing for the Mackay Cutters. He played for Mackay State High School then playing for Mackay Cutters in the Mal Meninga Cup.

=== Parramatta Eels ===
Being selected in the team of the year in 2021. In 2022, Miller-Stephen signed with Parramatta to join their SG Ball team, playing Fullback.

In 2023, Miller-Stephen played in NSW Cup for Parramatta. In round 23 of the 2023 NRL season, Miller-Stephen made his NRL debut for Parramatta against the St. George Illawarra Dragons, scoring a try in a 26–20 win at Commbank Stadium. On 14 November, it was announced that Miller-Stephen would miss the entire 2024 NRL season after suffering a serious knee injury at training. On 8 April 2025, Miller-Stephen was ruled out for the entire 2025 NRL season with an ACL injury.
