= Scott Mahon =

Australian rugby league footballer

Personal information
- Full name: Scott Mahon
- Born: 26 February 1970 (age 56) Sydney, New South Wales, Australia

Playing information
- Height: 188 cm (6 ft 2 in)
- Weight: 90 kg (14 st 2 lb)
- Position: Wing, Fullback, Centre
Club
Years	Team	Pld	T	G	FG	P
1988–96	Parramatta Eels	99	26	40	0	184
1992–93	Leigh Centurions	18	3	0	0	12
1994–95	Salford City Reds		6	5	0	34
1997–98	North Qld Cowboys	18	4	0	0	16
	Total	135	39	45	0	246

Scott Mahon (born 26 February 1970) is an Australian former professional rugby league footballer who played in the 1980s and 1990s. He played most of his career at the Parramatta Eels, but he also played for Leigh Centurions, Salford City Reds, and the North Queensland Cowboys. He mostly played on the wing, but also played the occasional game at fullback, or centre.

== Playing career ==
While attending Pendle Hill High School in Sydney, Mahon played for the Australian Schoolboys team in 1987. In round 22 of the 1988 season, Parramatta Eels coach John Monie called up Mahon, while still in high school, to make his first grade debut in place of the equally brilliant but injury prone Tony Cosatto, Mahon scored a try on debut in his side's 16-12 win over the Western Suburbs Magpies at Parramatta Stadium. Mahon also played in the Eels' 1988 Presidents Cup grand final victory over the Eastern Suburbs Roosters.

By 1990, Mahon was more of a regular in the first grade team. He finished the 1990 season as the Eels' top point scorer after scoring 5 tries and kicking 35 goals for a total of 90 points. In the 1992/93 off-season, Mahon traveled to England to play for English side Leigh Centurions. After his brief stint in England, Mahon returned to the Eels for the start of the 1993 season, he returned to the Eels as a much more mature player. In what was a season that produced mixed fortunes for the Eels, Mahon starred, playing in all 22 games and scoring 5 tries.

Mahon once again traveled to England in the 1994/95 off-season, this time to play for another English side the Salford City Reds. Mahon did not take part in the Eels 1995 season campaign. Mahon returned to top form with the Eels in the 1996 season. He finished the 1996 season as the team's equal top try scorer along with Chris Lawler. That season, he played alongside his brother Jamie in a Round 21 loss to the Sydney Tigers. Mahon's stint with the Eels ended at the conclusion of the 1996 season. After leaving Parramatta, Mahon was made a life member of the club.

In 1997, Mahon joined the North Queensland Cowboys. He played only 18 games in his two seasons with the Cowboys and announced his retirement at the conclusion of the 1998 season. He finished his career having played 117 games, scoring 30 tries, and kicking 33 goals.

== Coaching career ==
In 2013, Mahon was an assistant coach for the Gold Coast Titans under-20 team and head coach of Gold Coast White in the Mal Meninga Cup. In 2014, he was head coach of the Tweed Heads Seagulls under-20 team.

== Statistics ==
=== NSWRL/ARL/Super League/NRL ===
Season	Team	Matches	T	G	GK %	F/G	Pts
1988	Parramatta	1	1	0	—	0	4
1989	Parramatta	1	0	0	—	0	0
1990	Parramatta	19	5	35	58.3	0	90
1991	Parramatta	13	4	4	44.4	0	24
1992	Parramatta	7	2	0	—	0	8
1993	Parramatta	22	5	0	—	0	20
1994	Parramatta	17	1	1	100.0	0	6
1996	Parramatta	19	8	0	—	0	32
1997	North Queensland	14	3	0	—	0	12
1998	North Queensland	4	1	0	—	0	4
Career totals		117	30	40	57.14	0	200
