= 2000 NRL Grand Final =

Rugby league match

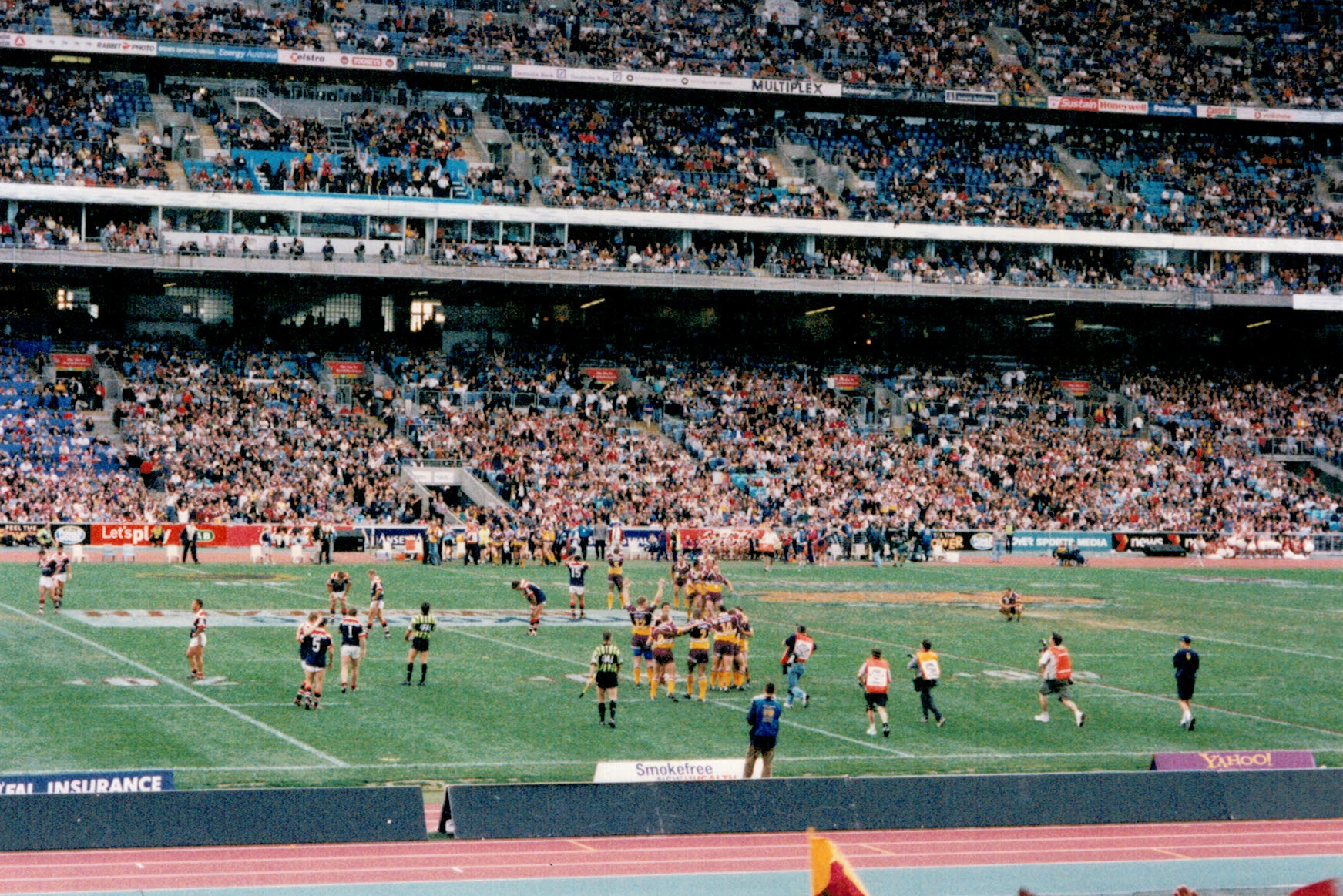
- View of Stadium Australia at full time

Brisbane Broncos	Sydney Roosters
14	6
	1	2	Total
BRI	10	4	14
SYD	2	4	6
- Date: 27 August 2000
- Stadium: Stadium Australia
- Location: Sydney, NSW, Australia
- Clive Churchill Medal: Darren Lockyer (BRI)
- National anthem: David Campbell
- Referee: Bill Harrigan
- Attendance: 94,277

Broadcast partners
- Broadcasters: Nine Network
- Commentators: Ken Sutcliffe (host); Ray Warren; Peter Sterling; Paul Vautin; Andrew Voss & Ricky Stuart (sideline)

The 2000 NRL Grand Final was the conclusive and premiership-deciding game of the 2000 NRL season. It was contested by the Brisbane Broncos, who had finished the season in first place, and the Sydney Roosters, who had finished the season in second place. The Brisbane Broncos were favourites heading into the grand final with the Sydney Roosters as underdogs. Brisbane were premiership favourites for most of the season after leading the competition every round since round 4. It was their fifth grand final appearance in nine years, while it was the first for the Roosters in 20 years. The attendance of 94,277 was the third highest ever seen at a rugby league match in Australia. It was the first time that the Clive Churchill Medal was presented separately with a ribbon being worn around the neck, as previously it was presented in a case.

== Background ==
The 2000 NRL season was the 93rd season of professional rugby league football in Australia and the third to be run by the National Rugby League. Fourteen teams competed from February until August for the minor premiership before the top eight teams played in the finals series, which culminated in the grand final. The season and grand final were played a month earlier than usual due to the 2000 Summer Olympics held in Sydney during September.

=== Brisbane Broncos ===
The 2000 Brisbane Broncos season was the thirteenth in the club's history. Coached by Wayne Bennett and captained by Kevin Walters, they finished the regular season first (out of 14 teams) to claim their fourth minor premiership. The Broncos played two finals matches (against the 8th-placed Cronulla-Sutherland Sharks then the 7th-placed Parramatta Eels), winning both to qualify for their fifth grand final.

=== Sydney Roosters ===
The 2000 Sydney Roosters season was the 93rd in the club's history. Coached by Graham Murray and captained by Brad Fittler, they finished the regular season second (out of 14 teams). After losing their first finals match, the Roosters won their next two to reach their 18th grand final.

== Teams ==
For Brisbane, Shane Webcke went into the match with a broken arm, with Tonie Carroll also under an injury cloud. It was revealed after the match that Darren Lockyer was also in doubt due to illness.

Sydney Roosters forward Luke Ricketson was in doubt up until the day of the match due to a hamstring injury.

Team details
Brisbane Broncos		Position	Sydney Roosters
Name	Number	Position	Number	Name
Darren Lockyer	1	Fullback	1	Luke Phillips
Lote Tuqiri	2	Wing	2	Matt Sing
Tonie Carroll	3	Centre	3	Ryan Cross
Michael De Vere	4	Centre	4	Shannon Hegarty
Wendell Sailor	5	Wing	5	Anthony Minichiello
Ben Ikin	6	Five eighth	6	Brad Fittler (c)
Kevin Walters (c)	7	Half back	7	Adrian Lam
Shane Webcke	8	Prop forward	8	Ian Rubin
Luke Priddis	9	Hooker	9	Simon Bonetti
Dane Carlaw	10	Prop forward	10	Peter Cusack
Gorden Tallis	11	Second row	11	Bryan Fletcher
Brad Thorn	12	Second row	12	Craig Fitzgibbon
Kevin Campion	13	Lock forward	13	Luke Ricketson
Harvey Howard	14	Interchange	14	Dallas Hood
Michael Hancock	16	Interchange	15	David Solomona
Shaun Berrigan	17	Interchange	16	Shane Rigon
Ashley Harrison	18	Interchange	17	Craig Wing
Wayne Bennett		Coach		Graham Murray

== Match details ==
=== First half ===
Sydney were unlucky not to have an early lead only three minutes in when centre Shannon Hegarty got over the line, but good cover defence by Brisbane fullback Darren Lockyer stopped the Roosters from scoring. The Broncos opened the scoring with a penalty goal to centre Michael De Vere to make it 2–0 at the 12th minute. Four minutes later, winger Lote Tuqiri scored the first try of the grand final which was converted by De Vere to make it 8–0 in Brisbane's favour. De Vere extended his side's lead out to 10–0 with another penalty goal in the 27th minute. The Roosters opened their scoring in the 35th minute with a penalty goal to fullback Luke Phillips to make it 10–2 and it remained that scoreline until halftime.

=== Second half ===
In the first minute of play after the break, Broncos five-eighth Ben Ikin got hit late with a high shot and went to the bench, missing twenty minutes of the second half. Brisbane had a chance to go ten in front with a shot at goal from the resulting penalty, but De Vere missed marginally. However, the Broncos extended their lead to 14–2 when Tuqiri’s wing partner Wendell Sailor scored a try of his own in the 56th minute, but De Vere’s sideline conversion attempt was unsuccessful by De Vere. Backrower Craig Fitzgibbon got Sydney's first try of the match in the 71st minute to give the Roosters a glimmer of hope, but Fitzgibbon’s conversion attempt of his own try was unsuccessful as it dropped onto the cross bar and bounced out, leaving the final score 14–6.

=== Scoreboard ===
2000 NRL Grand Final

Sunday, 27 August
15:00 AEDT (UTC+11)

Brisbane Broncos	14 – 6	Sydney Roosters
Tries: 2 Tuqiri 16'; Sailor 54'; Goals: 3 De Vere pen 11', 17', pen 26' (3/5)	1st: 10–2; 2nd: 4–4; Report	Tries: 1 Fitzgibbon 69' Goals: 1 Phillips pen 33' (1/1); Fitzgibbon (0/1)

Stadium Australia, Sydney
Attendance: 94,277
Referee: Bill Harrigan
Touch judges: Steve Lyons, Phil Cooley
Clive Churchill Medal: Darren Lockyer (Brisbane)

== See also ==
- 2000 Brisbane Broncos season
- 2001 World Club Challenge
