= John Malu =

Australian rugby league footballer

Personal information
- Born: 24 May 1978 (age 46)

Playing information
- Position: Wing
Club
Years	Team	Pld	T	G	FG	P
1998	North Qld Cowboys	2	0	0	0	0
2002	Northern Eagles	2	0	0	0	0
	Total	4	0	0	0	0
- Source: As of 12 February 2020

John Malu (born 24 May 1978) is a former rugby league footballer who played for the North Queensland Cowboys and Northern Eagles in the National Rugby League. He primarily played wing.

== Playing career ==
In Round 20 of the 1998 NRL season, Malu made his NRL debut for the North Queensland Cowboys in their 16–22 loss to the South Sydney Rabbitohs at Malanda Stadium. He spent the majority of the season playing for the Cowboys' Queensland Cup feeder club, the Townsville Stingers.

In 2002, Malu joined the Northern Eagles, playing two first grade games, starting one at five-eighth.

== Statistics ==
=== NRL ===
Statistics are correct to the end of the 2002 season

Season	Team	Matches	T	G	GK %	F/G	Pts
1998	North Queensland	2	0	0	—	0	0
2002	Northern Eagles	2	0	0	—	0	0
Career totals		4	0	0	—	0	0
