= Scott Whiting =

Australian rugby league footballer

Personal information
- Born: 10 February 1978 (age 47); Townsville, Queensland, Australia
- Height: 182 cm (6 ft 0 in)
- Weight: 94 kg (14 st 11 lb)

Playing information
- Position: Lock, Centre
Club
Years	Team	Pld	T	G	FG	P
1998–03	North Qld Cowboys	16	0	0	0	0
- Source: As of 12 February 2020

Scott Whiting (born 10 February 1978) is an Australian former rugby league professional footballer who played for the North Queensland Cowboys in the National Rugby League. A lock, he primarily played off the interchange.

== Background ==
A Centrals Tigers junior, Whiting attended Townsville State High School before being signed by the North Queensland Cowboys as an 18-year old.

== Playing career ==
In Round 23 of the 1998 NRL season, Whiting made his NRL debut in the Cowboys' 12–28 loss to the Manly Warringah Sea Eagles at Brookvale Oval. This would be Whiting's last NRL game for four years, playing predominantly for the Cowboys' feeder clubs, the Townsville Stingers and North Queensland Young Guns. In 2000, Whiting spent the season playing for the Wests Panthers before rejoining to the Cowboys in 2001.

In 2002, Whiting returned to first grade, playing 13 games. He played two more games in 2003 before being released by the Cowboys.

== Statistics ==
=== NRL ===
Statistics are correct to the end of the 2003 season

Season	Team	Matches	T	G	GK %	F/G	Pts
1998	North Queensland	1	0	0	—	0	0
2002	North Queensland	13	0	0	—	0	0
2003	North Queensland	2	0	0	—	0	0
Career totals		16	0	0	—	0	0

== Post-playing career ==
Following his rugby league career, Whiting became a general and bariatric surgeon, graduating from the University of Notre Dame in Western Australia.
