= Denny Lambert (rugby league) =

Australian rugby league player

Personal information
- Born: 23 September 1980 (age 46) Queensland, Australia
- Height: 166 cm (5 ft 5 in)
- Weight: 80 kg (12 st 8 lb)

Playing information
- Position: Halfback
Club
Years	Team	Pld	T	G	FG	P
1998	North Qld Cowboys	1	0	0	0	0
2001	Pia Donkeys		0	0	0	0
	Total	1	0	0	0	0
- Source: As of 11 February 2020

Denny Lambert (born 23 September 1980) is an Australian former rugby league professional footballer who played for the North Queensland Cowboys in the National Rugby League. He primarily played halfback.

== Background ==
A Collinsville Miners junior, Lambert represented the Queensland under-17 side while playing for Ipswich Brothers before being signed by the North Queensland Cowboys. Upon moving to Townsville, Lambert attended Townsville Grammar School.

== Playing career ==
In Round 24 of the 1998 NRL season, Lambert made his NRL debut in the Cowboys' 0–62 loss to the North Sydney Bears at North Sydney Oval. At the time, Lambert was the Cowboys' youngest ever debutant at 17 years and 334 days. His record was later broken by Jason Taumalolo, who debuted in 2010 at 17 years and 92 days. This would be Lambert's only first grade appearance for the club. He spent his time at the club playing for their feeder clubs, the Townsville Stingers and Cairns Cyclones, and the Cowboys NSWRL First Division side.

In 1998, he started at halfback in Queensland under-19's 22–8 win over New South Wales, scoring a try and kicking three goals. In 1999, he again represented the Queensland under-19 side, starting at halfback and kicking two goals in their 12–22 loss to New South Wales.

In 2001, after leaving the Cowboys, Lambert played for the Pia Donkey in the French Elite One Championship. In 2002, he joined the Wynnum Manly Seagulls, where he won the Queensland Cup's Courier Mail Medal for Player of the Year.

In 2006, after another stint in France with Pia, Lambert joined the Central Comets, where he co-captained the side. In 2007, he returned to Wynnum Manly, where he finished as runner-up for the Courier Mail Medal.

In 2009, Lambert joined the Souths Logan Magpies and later played for the Wests Panthers in the FOGS Cup and the Gatton Hawks in the Ipswich Rugby League.

== Statistics ==
=== NRL ===
Statistics are correct to the end of the 1998 season

Season	Team	Matches	T	G	GK %	F/G	Pts
1998	North Queensland	1	0	0	—	0	0
Career totals		1	0	0	—	0	0
