= Dallas Hood =

Australian rugby league footballer

Personal information
- Full name: Dallas Hood
- Born: 11 December 1977 (age 47)
- Height: 194 cm (6 ft 4 in)
- Weight: 107 kg (236 lb; 16 st 12 lb)

Playing information
- Position: Prop, Second-row
Club
Years	Team	Pld	T	G	FG	P
1997–02	Sydney Roosters	72	5	0	0	20
2003–04	Wakefield Trinity Wildcats	32	2	0	0	8
	Total	104	7	0	0	28
- Source: As of 23 January 2019

Dallas Hood (born 11 December 1977) is a former professional rugby league footballer who played in the 1990s and 2000s. He played at club level for Sydney Roosters and Wakefield Trinity Wildcats, as a prop or second-row.

== Playing career ==
Hood made his debut for Sydney in 1997. Hood appeared as a substitute in the Sydney Roosters 6–14 defeat by the Brisbane Broncos in the 2000 NRL Grand Final at Stadium Australia on Sunday 27 August 2000. In August 2002, Hood signed a two-year deal to join Wakefield Trinity Wildcats.
