= Leigh McWilliams =

Australian rugby league footballer

Personal information
- Born: 19 July 1978 (age 47) Newcastle, New South Wales, Australia
- Height: 180 cm (5 ft 11 in)
- Weight: 95 kg (14 st 13 lb)

Playing information
- Position: Hooker
Club
Years	Team	Pld	T	G	FG	P
1999–05	North Qld Cowboys	67	4	0	0	16
- Source: As of 10 February 2020

Leigh McWilliams (born 19 July 1978) is an Australian former rugby league footballer who played for the North Queensland Cowboys in the National Rugby League. He primarily played hooker.

== Background ==
McWilliams was born in Newcastle, New South Wales and played his junior rugby league for the Singleton Greyhounds. In 1995, while attending Singleton High School, he was selected in the Australian Schoolboys squad that toured Great Britain and France.

== Playing career ==
McWilliams was a Newcastle Knights junior before joining the Hunter Mariners, where he represented the Australian Super League under-19 side in 1997. In 1998, following the demise of the Hunters, McWilliams joined the North Queensland Cowboys, where he played for their Queensland Cup feeder side, the Townsville Stingers.

In Round 22 of the 1999 NRL season, he made his NRL debut for the Cowboys in their 8–40 loss to the Cronulla-Sutherland Sharks. He played just one more game in his rookie season, spending the majority of the year playing for the Cairns Cyclones in the Queensland Cup.

In Round 13 of the 2000 NRL season, McWilliams scored his first NRL try in a 50–4 win over the St George Illawarra Dragons. That season he played 12 games for the Cowboys, starting eight in his preferred position of hooker. Over the next two seasons, McWilliams only featured sporadically for the Cowboys. In 2003, he started 14 games for the Cowboys at hooker before his season ended due to injury. In 2004, McWilliams became a regular in the Cowboys side, playing 20 games as the club qualified for the finals for the first time.

In 2005, McWilliams played just seven NRL games for the Cowboys, spending the majority of the season with the North Queensland Young Guns. On 17 September 2005, he started at lock in the Young Guns' 36–6 Queensland Cup Grand Final win over the Burleigh Bears. He retired at the end of the 2005 season.

== Statistics ==
=== NRL ===
Statistics are correct to the end of the 2005 season

Season	Team	Matches	T	G	GK %	F/G	Pts
1999	North Queensland	2	0	0	—	0	0
2000	North Queensland	12	1	0	—	0	4
2001	North Queensland	3	0	0	—	0	0
2002	North Queensland	9	0	0	—	0	0
2003	North Queensland	14	2	0	—	0	8
2004	North Queensland	20	1	0	—	0	4
2005	North Queensland	7	0	0	—	0	0
Career totals		67	4	0	—	0	16
