= Luke Scott (rugby league) =

Australian rugby league player

Personal information
- Born: 12 September 1974 (age 50)

Playing information
- Position: Second-row
Club
Years	Team	Pld	T	G	FG	P
1997–98	North Qld Cowboys	22	3	0	0	12
- Source: As of 12 February 2020

Luke Scott (born 12 September 1974) is an Australian former rugby league footballer who played for the North Queensland Cowboys in the NRL. He primarily played as a second-row forward.

== Playing career ==
A Lismore Workers junior, Scott attended Trinity Catholic College where he represented New South Wales Combined Catholic Colleges in their undefeated tour of New Zealand in 1992, before joining the Souths Magpies in the Queensland Cup. While playing for Souths, Scott signed with the North Queensland Cowboys.

In Round 6 of the 1997 Super League season, Scott made his first-grade debut against t he Canterbury bulldogs and then his run on debut in the Cowboys' 16–42 loss to the Brisbane Broncos. In his debut season with the club he played 12 games, scoring three tries. Scott also played in all six World Club Challenge games that year including the WCC tour of the UK. In 1998, Scott played ten games, but his season was cut short by a shoulder injury.

In 1999, Scott joined the Redcliffe Dolphins. In his five years with the Dolphins, Scott played in four Queensland Cup Grand Finals, winning in 2000 and 2002, the latter in which he captained the side. Scott represented Queensland Residents on four occasions and captained the side in 2002 while playing for the Dolphins. Scott finished his Queensland Cup career having finished his Queensland Cup career with 129 appearances and 36 tries.. Following his Queensland Cup career, Scott returned to Lismore, playing for the Marist Brothers Rams.

In 2015, he was named the QRL's Queensland Cup 20th anniversary team.

== Statistics ==
=== Super League/NRL ===
Statistics are correct to the end of the 1998 season.

Season	Team	Matches	T	G	GK %	F/G	Pts
1997	North Queensland	12	3	0	–	0	12
1998	North Queensland	10	0	0	–	0	0
Career totals		22	3	0	–	0	12
