= Jason Ferris =

Australian rugby league footballer

Personal information
- Born: 6 July 1976 (age 50) Glen Innes, New South Wales, Australia

Playing information
- Height: 176 cm (5 ft 9 in)
- Weight: 87 kg (13 st 10 lb)
- Position: Halfback, Five-eighth
Club
| Years | Team | Pld | T | G | FG | P |
|---|---|---|---|---|---|---|
| 1996 | Canberra Raiders | 13 | 1 | 8 | 0 | 20 |
| 1997–98 | North Qld Cowboys | 26 | 2 | 7 | 2 | 24 |
| 1999–01 | Cronulla Sharks | 53 | 9 | 46 | 1 | 129 |
| 2002 | Northern Eagles | 13 | 2 | 29 | 0 | 66 |
| 2003 | Manly Sea Eagles | 18 | 2 | 7 | 1 | 23 |
| 2005 | Leigh Centurions | 4 | 1 | 0 | 0 | 4 |
| | Total | 127 | 17 | 97 | 4 | 266 |

Jason Ferris (born 6 July 1976) is an Australian former professional rugby league footballer who played in the 1990s and 2000s. Primarily a halfback, he played for the Canberra Raiders, North Queensland Cowboys, Cronulla-Sutherland Sharks, Northern Eagles, Manly Warringah Sea Eagles and Leigh Centurions.

== Background ==
Born in Glen Innes, New South Wales, Ferris played his junior rugby league for the Glen Innes Magpies before being signed by the Canberra Raiders. In 1994, while attending Erindale College, he captained the Australian Schoolboys.

== Playing career ==
In 1993, Ferris represented the New South Wales under-17 side, coming off the bench in a 17–22 loss to Queensland.

In Round 3 of the 1996 ARL season, Ferris made his first grade debut for the Raiders against the Parramatta Eels. In his rookie season, he played 13 games, scoring a try and kicking eight goals.

In 1997, Ferris signed with the North Queensland Cowboys, joining his former Raiders' head coach Tim Sheens at the club. In his first season at the club, he played just seven games. In 1998, he became the club's regular starting halfback, starting 19 games.

In 1999, he joined the Cronulla-Sutherland Sharks, playing 14 games as the club won the minor premiership and made it to the preliminary final, which they lost to the St George Illawarra Dragons. In 2000, he played 12 games, predominantly off the bench. In 2001, he played 27 games, starting the season as the club's starting halfback before moving into the hooker position. He started at hooker in the Sharks' preliminary final loss to the Newcastle Knights. He finished as the club's top point scorer that season with 121 points.

In 2002, Ferris joined the now-defunct Northern Eagles, playing in the club's last ever game, a 28–68 loss to the Penrith Panthers. In 2003, Ferris he moved to the Manly Warringah Sea Eagles, playing 18 games in his lone season for the club.

In 2004, Ferris he became captain-coach of Collegians in the Illawarra Rugby League competition. He was sounded out by the St George Illawarra Dragons about a return to the NRL during the season but the move did not eventuate.

In 2005, he moved to the Leigh Centurions in the Super League, captaining the side for four games before returning to Australia in March after fracturing his cheekbone.

== Statistics ==
=== ARL/Super League/NRL ===
| Season | Team | Matches | T | G | GK % | F/G | Pts |
|---|---|---|---|---|---|---|---|
| 1996 | Canberra | 13 | 1 | 8 | 57.1 | 0 | 20 |
| 1997 | North Queensland | 7 | 1 | 0 | — | 0 | 4 |
| 1998 | North Queensland | 19 | 1 | 7 | 41.2 | 2 | 20 |
| 1999 | Cronulla-Sutherland | 14 | 2 | 0 | — | 0 | 8 |
| 2000 | Cronulla-Sutherland | 12 | 0 | 0 | — | 0 | 0 |
| 2001 | Cronulla-Sutherland | 27 | 7 | 46 | 68.7 | 1 | 121 |
| 2002 | Northern Eagles | 13 | 2 | 29 | 78.4 | 0 | 66 |
| 2003 | Manly Warringah | 18 | 2 | 7 | 50.0 | 1 | 23 |
| Career totals | | 123 | 16 | 97 | 65.10 | 4 | 262 |

== Controversy ==
In November 2009, Ferris was assaulted by two men at Glen Innes and required corrective facial surgery after the attack. In 2010, Ferris was sentenced to at least 13 months in jail after he was convicted of stealing $7,500 from his former employers, the Criterion Hotel in Gundagai in October 2009. He was also charged with a mid-range drink driving offence and two offences of driving with a disqualified license. On appeal, he had his sentence downgraded.
