= Glen Murphy (rugby league) =

Australian rugby league footballer

Personal information
- Born: 4 July 1971 (age 55) Sarina, Queensland, Australia

Playing information
- Position: Second-row, Lock
Club
Years	Team	Pld	T	G	FG	P
1995–99	North Qld Cowboys	52	4	0	0	16

Glen Murphy (born 4 July 1971) is an Australian former professional rugby league footballer who played in the 1990s. Primarily a second-rower, he was a foundation player for the North Queensland Cowboys and later, a member of their coaching staff.

== Playing career ==
Born and raised in Sarina, Queensland, Murphy played for Mackay in the Foley Shield (winning the competition in 1992 and 1994), before joining the North Queensland Cowboys for their inaugural season in 1995. He made his first grade debut in Round 3 of that year, his only game for the season. During his five seasons with the club, Murphy would play 52 games, scoring four tries. In Round 21 of the 1999 NRL season, he played his 50th game for the club, the fourth player to do so.

== Achievements and accolades ==
=== Individual ===
North Queensland Cowboys Clubman of the Year: 2006

== Statistics ==
=== ARL/SL/NRL ===
Season	Team	Matches	T	G	GK %	F/G	Pts
1995	North Queensland	1	0	0	—	0	0
1996	North Queensland	15	1	0	—	0	4
1997	North Queensland	11	1	0	—	0	4
1998	North Queensland	9	1	0	—	0	4
1999	North Queensland	16	1	0	—	0	4
Career totals		52	4	0	—	0	1

== Post-playing career ==
Following his retirement, Murphy joined the Cowboys' coaching staff as the head strength and conditioning coach and was named their Clubman of the Year in 2006. At the end of the 2013 season, he was released after seven seasons in the role. In 2015, he worked as a strength and conditioning coach for the Townsville Blackhawks.
