= Jason Ryan (rugby league) =

Australian rugby league footballer

Personal information
- Born: 18 April 1972 (age 53)

Playing information
- Position: Wing, Five-eighth
Club
Years	Team	Pld	T	G	FG	P
1993	Penrith Panthers	3	0	0	0	0
1995–96	South Sydney	6	1	0	0	4
1997	North Qld Cowboys	1	0	0	0	0
	Total	10	1	0	0	4
- Source: As of 12 November 2025

Jason Ryan is an Australian former rugby league footballer who played for the Penrith Panthers, South Sydney Rabbitohs and North Queensland Cowboys in the 1990s. He primarily played wing and five-eighth.

== Playing career ==
In Round 9 of the 1993 NSWRL season, Ryan made his first grade debut for the Penrith Panthers in their 10–24 loss to the Western Suburbs Magpies.

After three first grade games with the Penrith club, Ryan joined the South Sydney Rabbitohs in 1994. Ryan played for Souths in their upset 1994 Tooheys Challenge Cup final victory over Brisbane.

In 1995, Ryan made his official club debut for South Sydney, playing four games that season. In 1997, after playing just two games in 1996 for South Sydney, Ryan joined the North Queensland Cowboys for the 1997 Super League season, playing one game. In 1998, he played for the Wynnum Seagulls in the Queensland Cup.

== Statistics ==
=== NSWRL/ARL/Super League ===
Statistics are correct to the end of the 1997 season

Season	Team	Matches	T	G	GK %	F/G	Pts
1993	Penrith	3	0	0	–	0	0
1995	South Sydney	4	1	0	–	0	4
1996	South Sydney	2	0	0	–	0	0
1997	North Queensland	1	0	0	–	0	0
Career totals		10	1	0	–	0	4
