= Owen Cunningham =

Australian rugby league footballer

Personal information
- Full name: Owen Cunningham
- Born: 23 January 1967 (age 59) Mackay, Queensland, Australia
- Height: 178 cm (5 ft 10 in)
- Weight: 96 kg (15 st 2 lb)

Playing information
- Position: Lock, Second-row, Prop
Club
Years	Team	Pld	T	G	FG	P
1985–96	Manly Sea Eagles	184	20	0	0	80
1997–98	North Qld Cowboys	41	1	0	0	4
1999	Manly Sea Eagles	24	1	0	0	4
2000	Northern Eagles	26	2	0	0	8
	Total	275	24	0	0	96
Representative
Years	Team	Pld	T	G	FG	P
1996	Queensland	1	0	0	0	0
1997	Queensland (SL)	3	0	0	0	0

Owen Cunningham (born 23 January 1967), nicknamed OJ, is an Australian former rugby league footballer who played in the 1980s, 1990s and 2000s. A Queensland State of Origin representative forward, he played his club football for the Manly Warringah Sea Eagles (with whom he won the 1996 premiership), North Queensland Cowboys and the Northern Eagles.

== Background ==
Born in Mackay, Queensland, Cunningham played his junior rugby league for Wests Mackay and attended Mirani State High School before being signed by the Manly Warringah Sea Eagles.

== Playing career ==
=== Manly Warringah Sea Eagles ===
In Round 18 of the 1985 NSWRL season, Cunningham made his first grade debut for Manly as an 18-year old against Eastern Suburbs. In 1987, he played in Manly's major semi-final victory over Easts but was not selected in the Grand Final, in which Manly defeated Canberra.

In October 1987, following Manly's Grand Final victory, Cunningham started at second-row in the club's World Club Challenge loss to English champions, Wigan. In 1989, Cunningham became a regular in the Sea Eagles side, starting the majority of his games at lock. In Round 9 of the 1993 NSWRL season, he played his 100th game in a 12–21 loss to the Canterbury-Bankstown Bulldogs.

In 1995, Cunningham signed with Super League while in career-best form, which meant he was not eligible for selection in the 1995 State of Origin series. On 24 September 1995, he played in Manly's shock Grand Final loss to the Bulldogs. Manly had finished the season as minor premiers and had only lost two games all year, where as Canterbury had finished in 6th and needed to win three sudden death matches just to reach the decider.

In 1996, Cunningham made his State of Origin debut for Queensland, coming off the bench in their Game III loss to New South Wales. Later that year, he started at lock in Manly's 20–8 Grand Final win over the St George Dragons

=== North Queensland Cowboys ===
In 1997, Cunningham returned to Queensland, joining the North Queensland Cowboys, winning the club's Player of the Year award. That season, he also represented Queensland in the Super League Tri-series. In Round 16 of the 1997 season he played his 200th game in a 14–22 loss to the Canberra Raiders.

In 1998, he played 23 games for the club, captaining the side in their 16–50 loss to the Sydney City Roosters.

=== Manly Warringah Sea Eagle (second stint) ===
In 1999, Cunningham re-joined Manly for their then final season as a stand-alone club, playing all 24 of their games. In Round 26 of the 1999 NRL season, he played in what was the club's last game, a 18–20 loss to the St George-Illawarra Dragons at WIN Stadium.

=== Northern Eagles ===
Following the conclusion of the 1999 season, Manly were forced to merge with arch-rivals North Sydney, forming the Northern Eagles. Cunningham was one of the players selected to be a part of the new side, playing 26 games in the 2000 NRL season. In Round 1 of the 2000 season, he played his 250th game in the Eagles' 24–14 win over the Newcastle Knights. He retired at the end of the season, with his final game a 22–32 loss to the Auckland Warriors at Mt Smart Stadium.

== Achievements and accolades ==
=== Individual ===
- North Queensland Cowboys Player of the Year: 1997

== Statistics ==
=== NSWRL/ARL/Super League/NRL ===
†	Denotes seasons in which Cunningham won a Premiership

Season	Team	Matches	T	G	GK %	F/G	Pts
1985	Manly Warringah	1	0	0	—	0	0
1986	Manly Warringah	8	0	0	—	0	0
1987	Manly Warringah	6	0	0	—	0	0
1988	Manly Warringah	12	0	0	—	0	0
1989	Manly Warringah	20	1	0	—	0	4
1990	Manly Warringah	15	1	0	—	0	4
1991	Manly Warringah	20	3	0	—	0	12
1992	Manly Warringah	9	2	0	—	0	8
1993	Manly Warringah	23	3	0	—	0	12
1994	Manly Warringah	23	6	0	—	0	24
1995	Manly Warringah	23	2	0	—	0	8
1996†	Manly Warringah	24	2	0	—	0	8
1997	North Queensland	18	0	0	—	0	0
1998	North Queensland	23	1	0	—	0	4
1999	Manly Warringah	24	1	0	—	0	2
2000	Northern Eagles	26	2	0	—	0	8
Career totals		275	24	0	—	0	96

=== State of Origin ===
Season	Team	Matches	T	G	GK %	F/G	Pts
1996	Queensland	1	0	0	—	0	0
Career totals		1	0	0	—	0	0

== Post-playing career ==
Upon retirement, Cunningham returned to Mackay and coached the Mackay Sea Eagles Foley Shield team from 2010 to 2012, winning the competition in 2011.

On 13 May 2022, Cunningham was involved in a fight at Suncorp Stadium, during NRL Magic Round. He claimed he was defending his son, who was coward punched by another fan.
