= Kyle Warren =

Australian rugby league footballer

Personal information
- Born: 1 February 1973 (age 53) Mackay, Queensland, Australia
- Height: 193 cm (6 ft 4 in)
- Weight: 97 kg (15 st 4 lb)

Playing information
- Position: Second-row, Lock
Club
Years	Team	Pld	T	G	FG	P
1997–01	North Qld Cowboys	87	26	0	0	104
2002	Castleford Tigers	30	3	0	0	12
	Total	117	29	0	0	116
- Source: As of 23 January 2020

Kyle Warren (born 1 February 1973) is an Australian former professional rugby league footballer who played in the 1990s and 2000s. He played for the North Queensland Cowboys in the National Rugby League and for the Castleford Tigers in the Super League. A utility capable of playing in the forwards and the backs, he primarily played as a second-row or lock.

== Background ==
Born in Mackay, Queensland, Warren played for Brothers (formally called All Whites) in Toowoomba before being signed by the Manly Sea Eagles.

== Playing career ==
In 1993 and 1994, Warren played for the Sea Eagles but did not feature in first grade for the club. In 1995, he returned to Queensland, joining the Toowoomba Clydesdales. In 1996, he represented the Queensland Residents and started at fullback in the Clydesdales' 8–6 1996 Queensland Cup Grand Final win over the Redcliffe Dolphins.

In 1997, Warren joined the North Queensland Cowboys, making his first grade debut in the side's 24–16 win over the Adelaide Rams at Stockland Stadium. Warren became a regular in the Cowboys' side during his five seasons at the club, playing 87 games and scoring 26 tries.

In 2002, Warren moved to the Castleford Tigers in the English Super League. In his lone season with the club he played 30 games, scoring three tries. He was released at the end of the season.

Warren returned to Australia in 2003, playing two seasons for the Ipswich Jets in the Queensland Cup. In 2005, Warren played his final season of rugby league for Brothers in Toowoomba, retiring at the end of the season.

== Statistics ==
=== NRL ===
Statistics are correct to the end of the 2001 season

Season	Team	Matches	T	G	GK %	F/G	Pts
1997	North Queensland	14	5	0	—	0	20
1998	North Queensland	20	4	0	0.0%	0	16
1999	North Queensland	18	6	0	—	0	24
2000	North Queensland	18	6	0	—	0	24
2001	North Queensland	17	5	0	—	0	20
Career totals		87	26	0	0.0%	0	104

=== Super League/Challenge Cup ===
Statistics are correct to the end of the 2002 season

Season	Team	Matches	T	G	GK %	F/G	Pts
2002 Super League	Castleford	27	3	0	—	0	12
2002 Challenge Cup	Castleford	3	0	0	–	0	0
Career totals		30	3	0	–	0	12

== Post-playing career ==
In 2006, Warren became the CEO of the Toowoomba Clydesdales for their final season in the Queensland Cup.
