= John Buttigieg (rugby league) =

Australian rugby league footballer

Personal information
- Born: 9 January 1977 (age 49) Townsville, Queensland, Australia

Playing information
- Height: 185 cm (6 ft 1 in)
- Weight: 114 kg (17 st 13 lb)
- Position: Prop
Club
Years	Team	Pld	T	G	FG	P
1995–03	North Qld Cowboys	101	5	0	0	20
Representative
Years	Team	Pld	T	G	FG	P
1999	Aborigines	2	0	0	0	0
2001–02	Queensland	3	1	0	0	4

John Buttigieg (born 9 January 1977) is an Australian former professional rugby league footballer who played in the 1990s and 2000s. A Queensland State of Origin representative prop, he spent his entire club career with the North Queensland Cowboys.

== Background ==
Born in Townsville, Queensland, Buttigieg is of Indigenous Australian and Maltese descent. He played his junior rugby league for Souths Townsville and attended Pimlico State High School before being signed by the North Queensland Cowboys.

== Playing career ==
In 1994, Buttigieg represented the Queensland under-17 team, starting at prop in a loss to New South Wales. In 1995, he was a member of the Cowboys' youth development squad.

In Round 13 of the 1996 ARL season, Buttigieg made his first grade debut against the Sydney Tigers, starting at prop. He played nine games during his rookie season. In 1999, after just 13 games the previous two seasons, Buttigieg became a regular in the Cowboys starting side, playing 17 games and winning the club's Players' Player award. In Round 6 of the 1999 season, he knocked out Penrith Panthers prop Craig Greenhill at Dairy Farmers Stadium during an off the ball incident. In October 1999, he represented the Arthur Beetson-coached Aborigines side, who defeated Papua New Guinea in a two-game series.

In 2001, Buttigieg made his State of Origin debut for Queensland, scoring a try in a 34–16 win over New South Wales at Lang Park. He missed Game II due to injury, but was recalled for the Game III decider, in which Queensland won the series.

In 2002, Buttiegied played 16 games for the Cowboys and again represented Queensland, playing in Game I of the series. In Round 13 of the 2003 NRL season, he played his 100th first grade game in a 24–28 loss to Penrith. On 25 August 2003, Buttigieg announced his retirement, due to an ongoing knee injury. Buttigiegs' right knee was operating bone on bone due to lack of cartilage, resulting in swelling.

== Achievements and accolades ==
=== Individual ===
- North Queensland Cowboys Players' Player: 1999

== Statistics ==
=== ARL/Super League/NRL ===
Season	Team	Matches	T	G	GK %	F/G	Pts
1996	North Queensland	9	0	0	—	0	0
1997	North Queensland	5	0	0	—	0	0
1998	North Queensland	9	0	0	—	0	0
1999	North Queensland	17	1	0	—	0	4
2000	North Queensland	22	0	0	—	0	0
2001	North Queensland	15	4	0	—	0	16
2002	North Queensland	16	0	0	—	0	0
2003	North Queensland	8	0	0	—	0	0
Career totals		101	5	0	–	0	20

=== State of Origin ===
†	Denotes seasons in which Buttigieg won a State of Origin Series

Season	Team	Matches	T	G	GK %	F/G	Pts
2001†	Queensland	2	1	0	—	0	4
2002	Queensland	1	0	0	—	0	0
Career totals		3	1	0	—	0	4

== Post-playing career ==
Following his retirement, Buttigieg moved to Mount Isa, where he coached the Mount Isa Bulls for a year before the club folded.
