= Ray Mercy =

Australian rugby league footballer

Personal information
- Full name: Raymond Mercy
- Born: 25 March 1974 (age 51)
- Height: 185 cm (6 ft 1 in)
- Weight: 92 kg (14 st 7 lb)

Playing information
- Position: Centre, Wing
Club
Years	Team	Pld	T	G	FG	P
1995	Parramatta Eels	9	1	0	0	4
1997–98	North Qld Cowboys	30	18	0	0	72
	Total	39	19	0	0	76
- Source: As of 28 July 2020

Ray Mercy (born 25 March 1974) is an Australian former professional rugby league footballer who played in the 1990s. Primarily a centre or winger, he played for Parramatta Eels and the North Queensland Cowboys.

== Playing career ==
A Norths Ipswich Tigers junior, Mercy made his first grade debut for Parramatta in Round 7 of the 1995 ARL season, coming off the bench in a 4–40 loss to the Auckland Warriors at Parramatta Stadium. He played 9 games for Parramatta in his debut season, which were all losses as the club finished second last. At the end of 1995, Mercy was released by the Eels as the club was looking to rebuild.

In 1996, Mercy played for the Atherton Roosters in the Cairns District Rugby League.

In 1997, Mercy joined the North Queensland Cowboys. That season, Mercy scored six tries in six games spending the majority of the season in reserve grade. In 1998, Mercy played his first full season of first grade, playing 24 games and scoring 12 tries for the Cowboys. In Round 2 of the 1998 season, Mercy scored four tries in a 26–2 win over the Balmain Tigers, setting the club record for most tries in a game, which still stands as of 2020. At the end of the season, he was released by the Cowboys.

In 2001, Mercy played for the Ipswich Jets in the Queensland Cup. In 2006, he switched codes to play rugby union with Grafton in northern New South Wales, after playing for a number of different local rugby league teams over the years, including the Booval Swifts, Lower Clarence and South Grafton. In 2019, he coached the Lower Clarence Magpies.

== Statistics ==
=== ARL/Super League/NRL ===
Season	Team	Matches	T	G	GK %	F/G	Pts
1995	Parramatta	9	1	0	—	0	4
1997	North Queensland	6	6	0	—	0	24
1998	North Queensland	24	12	0	—	0	48
Career totals		39	19	0	–	0	76
