= Bert Tabuai =

Australian rugby league footballer

Personal information
- Full name: Bert Tabuai
- Born: 9 February 1974 (age 51) Rockhampton, Queensland, Australia

Playing information
- Position: Lock, Centre, Second-row
Club
Years	Team	Pld	T	G	FG	P
1996	Canberra Raiders	2	0	0	0	0
1997–98	North Qld Cowboys	10	1	0	0	4
	Total	12	1	0	0	4
- Source: As of 15 January 2019

Bert Tabuai (born 9 February 1974) is an Australian former rugby league footballer best known for his brief time playing for the North Queensland Cowboys.

== Playing career ==
In 1995, Tabuai played for the Canberra Raiders U21s which won the NSWRL Presidents Cup Championship and was coached by current Melbourne Storm- Craig Bellamy which is equivalent to the current NRL U20s competition. Tabuai made his first-grade debut in 1996 against the North Queensland Cowboys coming off the Bench winning 66-10. Tabuai played 2 first grade games with the Canberra Raiders. https://web.archive.org/web/20171208204606/http://www.rugbyleagueproject.org/players/bert-tubuai/summary.html

Tabuai played ten games for the Townsville-based North Queensland Cowboys commencing in their third season when they competed in the Super League competition in 1997.

Tabuai continued playing for the Cowboys in the following season when they competed in the inaugural season of the newly formed National Rugby League competition.

Tabuai played in the Centre, Second Row and Lock positions. Tabuai scored one try for the Cowboys, after coming off the bench in the Round 16 match against the Illawarra Steelers at Wollongong Showground on 28 June 1998.

Prior to playing professional rugby league, Tabuai lived in Rockhampton and attended North Rockhampton State High School. Tabuai also played six games for the Rockhampton's QRL team, the Central Queensland Capras.
