= Liam Johnson (rugby league, born 1977) =

Australian rugby league player

Personal information
- Born: 15 August 1977 (age 48)

Playing information
- Position: Second-row
Club
Years	Team	Pld	T	G	FG	P
1996–98	North Qld Cowboys	8	1	0	0	4
- Source: As of 12 February 2020

Liam Johnson (born 15 August 1977) is an Australian former rugby league footballer who played for the North Queensland Cowboys in the NRL. He primarily played second-row.

== Playing career ==
In Round 17 of the 1996 ARL season, at 18-years old, Johnson made his first grade debut for the North Queensland Cowboys in their 24–14 win over the Gold Coast Chargers at Carrara Stadium. In Round 21 of the 1996 season, he scored his first try in a 24–20 win over the St George Dragons.

In 1998, Johnson played two NRL games for the Cowboys, spending the majority of the season playing for the Townsville Stingers in the Queensland Cup. In 1999, he played for the Cairns Cyclones.

== Statistics ==
=== ARL/NRL ===
Statistics are correct to the end of the 1998 season

Season	Team	Matches	T	G	GK %	F/G	Pts
1996	North Queensland	6	1	0	–	0	4
1998	North Queensland	2	0	0	–	0	0
Career totals		8	1	0	–	0	4
