= Adam Warwick =

Australian rugby league footballer

Personal information
- Born: 21 January 1977 (age 48)

Playing information
- Position: Wing, Fullback
Club
Years	Team	Pld	T	G	FG	P
1997–98	North Qld Cowboys	13	2	0	0	8
2000	Brisbane Broncos	1	0	0	0	0
	Total	14	2	0	0	8
- Source: As of 12 February 2020

Adam Warwick (born 21 January 1977) is an Australian former rugby league footballer who played for the North Queensland Cowboys and Brisbane Broncos in the National Rugby League. He primarily played wing.

== Playing career ==
In round 7 of the 1997 Super League season, Warwick made his first grade debut in the North Queensland Cowboys 4–6 loss to the Western Reds at the WACA Ground. He scored his first try six weeks later in the Cowboys' Round 13 loss to Canterbury. In 1998, Warwick played seven games in his final season with the North Queensland outfit.

In 1999, Warwick joined the Brisbane Broncos, playing for their Queensland Cup feeder club, the Toowoomba Clydesdales. In round 18 of the 2000 NRL season, he played his only game for the Brisbane club, starting on the wing in a 22–26 loss to the Newcastle Knights. On 19 August 2000, he started on the wing in Toowoomba's 6–14 loss to the Redcliffe Dolphins in the Queensland Cup Grand Final.

== Statistics ==
=== Super League/NRL ===
Statistics are correct to the end of the 2000 season

Season	Team	Matches	T	G	GK %	F/G	Pts
1997	North Queensland	6	1	0	–	0	4
1998	North Queensland	7	1	0	–	0	4
2000	Brisbane	1	0	0	–	0	0
Career totals		14	2	0	–	0	8
