= Mal Meninga Cup =

Queensland junior rugby football competition

- Sport: Rugby league
- Inaugural season: 2009
- Number of teams: 15
- Country: Australia
- Premiers: Tweed Seagulls (3rd title)
- Most titles: Townsville Blackhawks (5 titles)
- Website: www.qrl.com.au
- Related competition: SG Ball Cup

The Mal Meninga Cup, known as the Auswide Bank Mal Meninga Cup due to sponsorship, is a junior rugby league football competition based in Queensland, Australia, played between teams made up of players aged under 18. The competition, administered by the Queensland Rugby League, features the junior representative teams of Queensland Cup clubs.

Since 2011, the winners of the Grand Final play the winners of the New South Wales’ under-18 competition, the S.G. Ball Cup, in the National Final.

The Mal Meninga Cup is named after Mal Meninga, a 32-game Queensland representative and the most successful State of Origin coach of all time.

== Teams ==
The Mal Meninga Cup consists of fifteen clubs: fourteen based in Queensland and one in New South Wales. The competition currently operates on a single group system, after using a pool system for eight seasons.

Fourteen of the fifteen clubs are junior representative teams for Queensland Cup clubs.
The Wide Bay Bulls currently have no Queensland Cup affiliation.

=== Current clubs ===
Mal Meninga Cup
Club	Est.	City	State	Stadium	Titles (Last)
Brisbane Tigers	1917	Brisbane	Queensland	Totally Workwear Stadium	0
Burleigh Bears	1934	Gold Coast	Queensland	UAA Oval	0
Central Queensland Capras	1996	Rockhampton	Queensland	Browne Park	0
Ipswich Jets	1982	Ipswich	Queensland	North Ipswich Reserve	0
Mackay Cutters	2007	Mackay	Queensland	BB Print Stadium Mackay	0
Northern Pride	2007	Cairns	Queensland	Barlow Park	0
Norths Devils	1933	Brisbane	Queensland	Bishop Park	2 (2011)
Redcliffe Dolphins	1947	Redcliffe	Queensland	Kayo Stadium	2 (2023)
Souths Logan Magpies	1918	Brisbane	Queensland	Davies Park	2 (2022)
Sunshine Coast Falcons	1996	Sunshine Coast	Queensland	Sunshine Coast Stadium	0
Townsville Blackhawks	1998	Townsville	Queensland	Jack Manski Oval	5 (2016)
Tweed Seagulls	1909	Tweed Heads	New South Wales	Piggabeen Sports Complex	3 (2023)
Western Clydesdales	1996	Toowoomba	Queensland	Clive Berghofer Stadium	1 (2017)
Wide Bay Bulls	2009	Bundaberg	Queensland	Various Venues	0
Wynnum Manly Seagulls	1951	Brisbane	Queensland	BMD Kougari Oval	0
Brisbane Tigers played as Easts Tigers from 2009 to 2020.; CQ Capras played as Central Comets from 2009 to 2011.; Townsville Blackhawks played as Townsville Stingers from 2009 to 2015.; Western Clydesdales played as Toowoomba Clydesdales from 2009 to 2016 and Western Mustangs 2017 to 2021.; Wide Bay Bulls rejoined the competition in 2021.

=== Previous clubs ===
Mal Meninga Cup
Club	Seasons	City	State	Stadium	Titles (Last)
Central Crows	2011–2017	Bundaberg	Queensland	Across the Waves Sportsground	0
Gold Coast Blue	2010	Gold Coast	Queensland	Merv Craig Sporting Complex	0
Gold Coast Gold	2011–2012	Gold Coast	Queensland	Pizzey Park	0
Gold Coast Green	2010–2016	Gold Coast	Queensland	Pizzey Park	0
Gold Coast Vikings	2009	Gold Coast	Queensland	Pizzey Park	0
Gold Coast White	2013–2016	Gold Coast	Queensland	Pizzey Park	0
Wests Panthers	2011–2012	Brisbane	Queensland	Purtell Park	0
Central Crows played as Central United from 2011 to 2013.

== Grand Final results ==
Season	Grand Finals
Season	Premiers	Score	Runners-up	Venue
2009	Norths Devils	20–18	Townsville Stingers	Bishop Park
2010	Townsville Stingers	26–24	Norths Devils	Langlands Park
2011	Norths Devils	28–10	Townsville Stingers	Langlands Park
2012	Townsville Stingers	22–14	Redcliffe Dolphins	BMD Kougari Oval
2013	Redcliffe Dolphins	44–16	Gold Coast White	Langlands Park
2014	Townsville Stingers	22–18	Norths Devils	Barlow Park
2015	Townsville Stingers	30–24	Easts Tigers	Tapout Energy Stadium
2016	Townsville Blackhawks	38–16	Norths Devils	Suzuki Stadium
2017	Western Mustangs	40–30	Souths Logan Magpies	Suzuki Stadium
2018	Souths Logan Magpies	18–16	Norths Devils	Bishop Park
2019	Tweed Heads Seagulls	28–24	Wynnum Manly Seagulls	Kougari Oval
2020	Season cancelled
2021	Tweed Heads Seagulls	30–24	Townsville Blackhawks	Jack Manski Oval
2022	Souths Logan Magpies	38–26	Townsville Blackhawks	Sunshine Coast Stadium
2023	Redcliffe Dolphins	36-18	Townsville Blackhawks	Totally Workwear Stadium
2024	Tweed Seagulls	36-12	Burleigh Bears	Kayo Stadium

== See also ==
- Rugby League Competitions in Australia
