= Michael Coorey =

Lebanon international rugby league footballer

Personal information
- Born: 16 May 1975 (age 51) Warwick, Queensland, Australia
- Height: 188 cm (6 ft 2 in)
- Weight: 98 kg (15 st 6 lb)

Playing information
- Position: Second-row, Lock, Centre
Club
Years	Team	Pld	T	G	FG	P
1996–98	North Qld Cowboys	18	1	0	0	4
2001–03	Brisbane Broncos	7	0	0	0	0
	Total	25	1	0	0	4
Representative
Years	Team	Pld	T	G	FG	P
1999–02	Lebanon	5	6	0	0	24
2003	Queensland Residents	1	1	0	0	4
- Source: As of 8 January 2024

Michael Coorey (born 16 May 1975) is a former Lebanon international rugby league footballer in the 1990s and 2000s. Primarily a second-rower, he played for the North Queensland Cowboys and Brisbane Broncos in the National Rugby League.

== Background ==
Born in Warwick, Queensland, Coorey, who is of Lebanese descent, played his junior rugby league for the Warwick Collegians before being signed by the North Queensland Cowboys.

== Playing career ==
In 1994, Coorey represented the Queensland under-19 team and the Junior Kangaroos.

In Round 11 of the 1996 ARL season, Coorey made his first grade debut in the Cowboys' 26–10 win over the Newcastle Knights. In Round 13, he scored his first try in a 16–18 loss to the Sydney Tigers. In 1998, after not playing first grade in 1997, Coorey played seven NRL games for the Cowboys.

In 1999, Coorey played for the Cairns Cyclones in the Queensland Cup. On 14 November 1999, he made his international debut for Lebanon, scoring two tries in a 24–38 loss to France in the Mediterranean Cup. A week later, he scored a hat-trick in Lebanon's 2000 Rugby League World Cup qualification play-off win over the United States.

In 2000, Coorey joined the Balmain Tigers, the Wests Tigers feeder club, in the NSWRL First Division. Later that year, he represented Lebanon at the 2000 Rugby League World Cup, playing two games and scoring a try in a 22–24 loss to Wales.

In 2001, Coorey joined the Brisbane Broncos. He made his debut for the club in a semi-final win over the St George Illawarra Dragons. During his three years at the Broncos, he played seven games, playing predominantly for the Toowoomba Clydesdales, their Queensland Cup feeder club. In 2002, he again represented Lebanon at the Mediterranean Cup. In 2003, he represented the Queensland Residents, scoring a try in their 36–12 win over New South Wales.

== Statistics ==
=== ARL/NRL ===
Season	Team	Matches	T	G	GK %	F/G	Pts
1996	North Queensland	11	1	0	–	0	4
1998	North Queensland	7	0	0	–	0	0
2001	Brisbane	2	0	0	–	0	0
2002	Brisbane	3	0	0	–	0	0
2003	Brisbane	2	0	0	–	0	0
Career totals		25	1	0	–	0	4

=== International ===
Season	Team	Matches	T	G	GK %	F/G	Pts
1999	Lebanon	2	5	0	–	0	20
2000	Lebanon	2	1	0	–	0	4
2002	Lebanon	1	0	0	–	0	0
Career totals		5	6	0	–	0	24
