= Scott Wilson (rugby league, born 1970) =

Australian rugby league player

Personal information
- Full name: Scott Wilson
- Born: 8 November 1970 (age 55)

Playing information
- Height: 178 cm (5 ft 10 in)
- Weight: 88 kg (13 st 12 lb)
- Position: Fullback, Wing, Centre, Five-eighth
Club
Years	Team	Pld	T	G	FG	P
1988–90	South Sydney	13	3	0	0	12
1991–92	North Sydney Bears	20	6	0	0	24
1993–94	Canterbury Bulldogs	30	9	2	0	38
1994–95	Salford City	2	0	0	0	0
1995	Gold Coast Seagulls	17	5	0	0	20
1996–97	Western Reds	23	7	0	0	28
1998	North Qld Cowboys	2	0	0	0	0
1998	Canterbury Bulldogs	4	0	0	0	0
1998–99	Warrington Wolves	28	8	0	0	32
	Total	139	38	2	0	154
Representative
Years	Team	Pld	T	G	FG	P
1997	New South Wales (SL)	1	0	0	0	0

Scott Wilson (born 8 November 1970) is an Australian former professional rugby league footballer who played in the 1980s and 1990s. He played as a fullback, wing, centre or five-eighth.

== Playing career ==
Wilson as a youngster played in the South Sydney Juniors competition for Coogee Randwick Wombats. While at South Sydney High School in 1986, Wilson was selected to play for the Australian Schoolboys team.

Wilson made his first grade début for the South Sydney Rabbitohs in round 8 of the 1988 NSWRL season against Manly-Warringah Sea Eagles at Brookvale Oval, coming off the bench in the second half. It later transpired that he was used as an illegal replacement and Souths were ultimately stripped of the two competition points they earned that afternoon. He would be sacked by South Sydney in 1990 after returning a position test for cocaine, and was sacked again by the North Sydney Bears during the 1991 season for another positive drugs test.

He started at fullback in the 1994 Winfield Cup Grand Final for the Canterbury-Bankstown Bulldogs against the Canberra Raiders. Wilson was benched by coach Chris Anderson after a number of errors in the first half.

Wilson played for six first grade clubs during his career: South Sydney Rabbitohs, North Sydney Bears, Canterbury-Bankstown Bulldogs (twice), Gold Coast, Western Reds and North Queensland Cowboys, scoring 30 tries in 109 first grade matches. He also played for Salford and Warrington Wolves in the Super League competition.

Wilson was selected to represent New South Wales as an interchange player for game III of the 1997 Super League Tri-series against New Zealand.

== Career highlights ==
- First Grade Debut: 1988 — Round 8, Rabbitohs vs Manly-Warringah Sea Eagles at Brookvale Oval, 25 April
- Representative Selection: 1997 — Game III, Super League Tri-series, NSW vs New Zealand at Bruce Stadium, 14 May, winning 20–15
