= Marshall Miller =

Australian rugby league footballer

Playing information
- Position: Wing
Club
Years	Team	Pld	T	G	FG	P
1996–97	North Qld Cowboys	7	4	0	0	16
- Source: As of 13 February 2020
- Relatives: Arthur Miller-Stephen (nephew)

Marshall Miller is an Australian former rugby league footballer who played for the North Queensland Cowboys in the 1990s. He primarily played wing.

== Playing career ==
A Mackay junior, Miller represented the Queensland under-19 side, starting on the wing, before joining the North Queensland Cowboys in 1996. In Round 15 of the 1996 ARL season, he made his first grade debut in the Cowboys' 32–40 loss to the Western Suburbs Magpies, starting on the wing and scoring two tries. In his rookie season, he played six games, scoring four tries. In 1997, he played just one game for the Cowboys.

After leaving the Cowboys, he returned to Mackay, playing for the Wests Tigers. He was named the club's Player of the Year three times (1998, 2000 and 2008) and played over 100 games for the club.

== Statistics ==
=== ARL/Super League ===
Statistics are correct to the end of the 1997 season

Season	Team	Matches	T	G	GK %	F/G	Pts
1996	North Queensland	6	4	0	–	0	16
1997	North Queensland	1	0	0	–	0	0
Career totals		7	4	0	–	0	16
