= Dion Cope =

Australian rugby league player

Playing information
- Position: Centre, Wing
Club
Years	Team	Pld	T	G	FG	P
1995–96	Cronulla Sharks	5	0	0	0	8
1997	North Qld Cowboys	7	0	0	0	0
	Total	12	0	0	0	8
- Source: As of 12 February 2020

Dion Cope is an Australian former rugby league footballer who played for the Cronulla Sharks and North Queensland Cowboys in the 1990s. He primarily played centre.

== Playing career ==
In Round 20 of the 1995 ARL season, Cope made his first grade debut for the Cronulla Sharks in their 48–18 win over the Parramatta Eels at Parramatta Stadium. In 1996, Cope played four games for the Sharks, all off the bench. In 1997, he joined the North Queensland Cowboys, playing seven games, starting three at centre and two on the wing.

In 1999, Cope played for the Easts Tigers in the Queensland Cup.

== Statistics ==
=== ARL/Super League ===
Statistics are correct to the end of the 1997 season

Season	Team	Matches	T	G	GK %	F/G	Pts
1995	Cronulla	1	0	0	–	0	0
1996	Cronulla	4	0	0	–	0	0
1997	North Queensland	7	0	0	–	0	0
Career totals		12	0	0	–	0	0
