= Dale Fritz =

Australian rugby league footballer

Personal information
- Born: 18 November 1969 (age 56) Australia

Playing information
- Position: Five-eighth, Lock
Club
Years	Team	Pld	T	G	FG	P
1989–93	Illawarra Steelers	73	8	0	0	32
1994	Western Suburbs	2	0	0	0	0
1995–97	Perth Reds	58	3	0	0	12
1998	North Qld Cowboys	21	0	0	0	0
1999–03	Castleford Tigers	124	9	0	0	36
	Total	278	20	0	0	80

Dale Fritz (born 18 November 1969) is an Australian former rugby league footballer who played in the 1980s, 1990s and 2000s.

== Playing career ==
Fritz played for the Illawarra Steelers, the Western Suburbs Magpies, Western Reds and the North Queensland Cowboys in Australia. In the later stages of his career, Fritz played in the Super League for the Castleford Tigers.

== Post playing ==
Fritz is currently a strength and conditioning coach at the Western Suburbs Magpies.

== Sources ==
- Alan Whiticker & Glen Hudson (2007). The Encyclopedia of Rugby League Players. Wetherill Park, New South Wales: Gary Allen Pty Ltd. ISBN 978-1-877082-93-1.
