= Steve Walters =

Former Australia international rugby league footballer

Personal information
- Full name: Steven Walters
- Born: 28 August 1965 (age 60) Rockhampton, Queensland, Australia

Playing information
- Height: 176 cm (5 ft 9 in)
- Position: Hooker
Club
Years	Team	Pld	T	G	FG	P
	Booval Swifts
1984–85	Northern Suburbs	27	4	0	0	16
1986–96	Canberra Raiders	228	41	0	0	164
1997–98	North Qld Cowboys	37	6	0	0	24
1999	Newcastle Knights	7	2	0	0	8
	Total	299	53	0	0	212
Representative
Years	Team	Pld	T	G	FG	P
1990–96	Queensland	14	1	0	0	4
1991–94	Australia	15	4	0	0	16
1997	Queensland (SL)	3	0	0	0	0
1997	Australia (SL)	3	1	0	0	4
- Relatives: Kerrod Walters (brother); Kevin Walters (brother); Billy Walters (nephew)

Steve Walters (born 28 August 1965), also known by the nickname of "Boxhead", is an Australian former professional rugby league footballer who played in the 1980s and 1990s who at the peak of his career was considered the best hooker in the game. An Australian Kangaroos and Queensland Maroons representative, he played in the Canberra Raiders' 1st, 2nd and 3rd NSWRL grand final victories.

== Background ==
Walters was born in Rockhampton, Queensland. His family relocated to Ipswich, QLD when he was a young boy. Steve is the younger brother of Ipswich Jets winger Brett and older brother of Andrew and twins (Kerrod and Kevin).

== Playing career ==
In Ipswich there that he started his playing career for the Booval club. In 1984, he moved to the Northern Suburbs club in the Brisbane Rugby League, where his brother Brett played on the wing. Walters' first-grade debut came in Norths' 37–4 loss to the Redcliffe Dolphins in Round 8 of the 1984 BRL season, after the club lost two hookers to injury in the pre-season and Winfield State League. In 1986 Walters made his New South Wales Rugby League debut with the Canberra Raiders. He played for Canberra at hooker in the 1987 NSWRL season's grand final loss to the Manly Sea Eagles alongside his brother Kevin. Walters played for Canberra at hooker in the 1989 NSWRL season's first ever premiership victory over the Balmain Tigers alongside his brother Kevin as well. He then traveled with the Raiders to England for the 1989 World Club Challenge, playing hooker in their loss to British champions, Widnes.

Walters was selected by Queensland to play at hooker for game I of the 1990 State of Origin series, being replaced by his brother Kerrod for games II and III. Walters played in the 1990 NSWRL season's grand final at hooker in the Raiders' victory over the Penrith Panthers. Walters was selected as Queensland's hooker for all three games of the 1991 State of Origin series, being named man-of-the-match in game II. He was then selected as Australia's hooker for all three games of the 1991 Trans-Tasman Test series against New Zealand. The Canberra Raiders reached the 1991 NSWRL season's grand final and Walters played at hooker in the loss to the Penrith Panthers.

Walters was selected as Queensland's hooker for all three games of the 1992 State of Origin series. He was then selected as Australia's hooker for all three of the 1992 Great Britain Lions tour of Australasia's Ashes Tests alongside his brother Kevin. Walters played in Australia's 1989–1992 Rugby League World Cup Final victory at hooker and was named man-of-the-match. Walters was selected as Queensland's hooker for all three games of the 1993 State of Origin series. He was then selected as Australia's hooker for all three games of the 1993 Trans-Tasman Test series. For the 1993 NSWRL season Walters was named Rugby League Week's player of the year.

Walters was selected to play for Queensland at hooker in games I and III of the 1994 State of Origin series. He was then selected as Australia's hooker for the 1994 French rugby league Oceania tour's sole test match. alters, with the Canberra Raiders, reached the 1994 NSWRL season's Grand Final, in which he played at hooker in the victory over the Canterbury-Bankstown Bulldogs. During the 1994 Kangaroo tour of Great Britain and France Walters played all three Ashes Tests at hooker alongside his brother, Kevin Walters at five-eighth. Steve was also man-of-the-match in Australia's victory over Great Britain in the third and deciding match of the series.

Due to the Super League War Walters, along with many of his Canberra team-mates, was a notable exclusion from the 1995 State of Origin series, 1995 Trans-Tasman Test series and 1995 Rugby League World Cup. He was selected by Queensland to play at hooker in games II and III of the 1996 State of Origin series. 1996 was his last season with Canberra before moving to the North Queensland Cowboys. During the 1997 North Queensland Cowboys season Steve Walters captained 8 games. He played another season in Townsville before a final season with the Newcastle Knights in 1999.

== Retirement ==
In 2000, Walters was awarded the Australian Sports Medal for his contribution to Australia's international standing in the sport of rugby league. In February 2008, Walters was named in the list of Australia's 100 Greatest Players (1908–2007) which was commissioned by the NRL and ARL to celebrate the code's centenary year in Australia.
