= Mark Shipway =

Australian rugby league footballer

Personal information
- Full name: Mark Shipway
- Born: 3 May 1976 (age 49)

Playing information
- Height: 191 cm (6 ft 3 in)
- Weight: 100 kg (15 st 10 lb)
- Position: Loose forward, Centre, Second-row
Club
Years	Team	Pld	T	G	FG	P
1997–01	North Qld Cowboys	91	9	0	0	36
2002	Northern Eagles	21	1	0	0	4
2003	Manly Sea Eagles	14	1	0	0	4
2004–05	Salford City Reds	42	3	0	0	12
	Total	168	14	0	0	56

Mark Shipway (born 3 May 1976 in Australia) is a former professional rugby league footballer who played for the North Queensland Cowboys, the Northern Eagles and the Manly-Warringah Sea Eagles in the National Rugby League (NRL). He also played for the Salford City Reds in the Super League and for the Redcliffe Dolphins in the Queensland Cup. He primarily played at centre or second-row.

== Playing career ==
Shipway made his professional debut for the North Queensland Cowboys in the Australian Super League in round 2 of the 1997 season against the Western Reds. Shipway played a further four more seasons for the Cowboys in the National Rugby League; the competition formed following the Super League War. Shipway then joined the Northern Eagles and played for the club in its last ever game, a 68–28 loss to Penrith in which Shipway scored a try.

The following year, the Northern Eagles reformed itself as the Manly-Warringah Sea Eagles after which he played one further year for the club before leaving for a two-year stint in the Super League.

Shipway had originally joined the Cowboys after several years of playing in the Queensland Cup (formerly known as the BRL Cup) for the Redcliffe Dolphins. He made his debut for Redcliffe in 1996 but had joined them a season earlier as a colt. He won a premiership in 1996 and also in 2006 with Redcliffe, after returning to the Queensland Cup outfit following his two-year stint at the Salford City Reds in the Super League.
