= Jim Ahmat =

Australian rugby league footballer

Personal information
- Full name: Jim Ahmat
- Born: 22 October 1978 (age 46); Australia

Playing information
- Position: Fullback, Wing, Stand-off
Club
Years	Team	Pld	T	G	FG	P
1997–98	North Queensland Cowboys	4	2	0	0	8
- As of 9 August 2021

Jim Ahmat is an Australian former professional rugby league footballer.

== Playing career ==
Ahmat played four matches for the North Queensland Cowboys in the 1997 and 1998 seasons.

Ahmat played the 2009 season with team Moranbah in the Mackay & District Rugby League.
