= Luke Phillips =

Australian rugby league footballer

Lucas Phillips
Personal information
- Born: 4 August 1975 (age 51) Canberra, Australian Capital Territory, Australia
- Height: 181 cm (5 ft 11 in)
- Weight: 91 kg (14 st 5 lb)

Playing information
- Position: Fullback, Wing
Club
Years	Team	Pld	T	G	FG	P
1996	Canberra Raiders	1	0	2	0	4
1997	North Qld Cowboys	17	8	45	0	122
1998	Manly Sea Eagles	22	6	50	1	125
1999–02	Sydney Roosters	65	19	34	3	147
	Total	105	33	131	4	398
- Source: As of 12 November 2010

Luke Phillips (born 4 August 1975) is an Australian professional rugby league football match official and former player. He started refereeing National Rugby League Premiership matches in 2010, having played seven seasons in the 1990s and 2000s as a goal-kicking fullback for the Sydney Roosters (with whom he won the 2002 NRL Premiership), Canberra Raiders, Manly Warringah Sea Eagles and North Queensland Cowboys.

== Playing career ==
After playing for West Belconnen Warriors as a junior, Phillips made his first-grade debut for the Canberra Raiders in the 1996 ARL season against the Western Reds at the WACA Ground.

He played for the North Queensland Cowboys during the 1997 Super League season. He spent his third year in the top grade at a third club after moving to the Manly Sea Eagles for in 1998.

The following year he moved to the Sydney Roosters where he would remain for the rest of his career. His performance for the club at fullback in their 2000 NRL Grand Final loss to the Brisbane Broncos drew glowing praise. The Roosters made the 2002 NRL Grand Final and Phillips played at fullback in the winning side with a shoulder injury that was later operated on in the off-season. Phillips' form at the back saw Roosters coach Ricky Stuart keep Brett Mullins on the wing (Mullins is a former teammate of both Stuart and Phillips at the Raiders in 1996 and was also the first choice fullback for the Australian test team (alongside Stuart who was the test Halfback) on the 1994 Kangaroo tour). However he retired during the first half of the 2003 NRL season after failing to recover.

== Refereeing career ==
At a Sydney Roosters function sometime after his retirement, Luke Phillips was still trying to decide what to in life after football. It was there that former Grand Final and State of Origin winning coach Phil Gould said to him "Why don't you have a go at refereeing? The NRL is looking for players who want to pick up a whistle". Phillips, looking for a way to stay involved in the game, decided to give it a go, though he initially believed he wouldn't enjoy it.

After starting out in the Central Coast Division in 2007, Phillips was given a cadetship with the NRL in 2008 (alongside other former first grade players Henry Perenara and Paul Mellor). He then started officiating in the Under-20s National Youth Competition (NYC) in 2009. His first appearance in the NRL was as a touch judge in Round 26 of the 2009 NRL season.

=== NRL ===
After spending most of 2010 refereeing in the NSW Cup (reserve grade), Luke Phillips made his first grade debut as a referee on 21 August for a Round 24 match of the 2010 NRL season at AAMI Park in Melbourne as the Melbourne Storm defeated Cronulla 24–4. He then made a further three appearances in the 2011 NRL season while mostly officiating in the 2011 NSW Cup. He spent all of 2012 refereeing in the NSW Cup, though he has since become a regular first grade referee in the 2013 NRL season.

Although he was yet to make his NRL debut as a referee at the time, Phillips was selected alongside Ashley Klein, Shayne Hayne and Gavin Badger to referee the inaugural NRL All Stars game at Skilled Park on the Gold Coast in 2010.

Phillips juggles his time as a full-time NRL referee with running his own Pinball and Video game supply business.
