= Shane Vincent =

Australian rugby league footballer

Personal information
- Full name: Shane Vincent
- Born: 3 March 1973 (age 53) unknown

Playing information
- Position: Centre, Wing
Club
Years	Team	Pld	T	G	FG	P
1993	Penrith Panthers	7	2	0	0	8
1994	Newcastle Knights	3	1	0	0	4
1995–96	London Broncos	6	5	4	0	28
1996	South Sydney	1	0	0	0	0
1997	North Qld Cowboys	2	0	0	0	0
	Total	19	8	4	0	40

Shane Vincent (birth unknown) is a former rugby league footballer who played in the 1990s. He played for the Penrith Panthers in 1993, the Newcastle Knights in 1994, London Broncos, the South Sydney Rabbitohs in 1996, and finally the North Queensland Cowboys in 1997.
