= Townsville Stingers =

Australian rugby league club based in Townsville, QLD

Club information
- Full name: Townsville Stingers Rugby League Football Club
- Short name: Stingers
- Colours: Blue; Gold
- Founded: 1998; 28 years ago

Current details
- Ground: Dairy Farmers Stadium & Townsville Sports Reserve
- Competition: Townsville & District Rugby League, Mal Meninga Cup, Cyril Connell Cup, Queensland Cup

Townsville Stingers Rugby League Club are an Australian rugby league football club based in Townsville formed in 1998. The team played in the Queensland Cup before exiting in the 1998 season.
