= 2000 North Queensland Cowboys season =

Australian rugby team season

Coordinates: 19°18′58″S 146°42′43″E

- NRL Rank: 14th
- Play-off result: Missed finals
- 2000 record: Wins: 7; draws: 0; losses: 19
- Points scored: For: 436; against: 612

Team information
- Coach: Tim Sheens
- Captain: Tim Brasher
- Stadium: Dairy Farmers Stadium
- Avg. attendance: 15,511
- High attendance: 27,643 (vs. Brisbane Broncos, Round 6)

Top scorers
- Tries: Paul Bowman (8)
- Goals: Julian O'Neill (66)
- Points: Julian O'Neill (144)
← 1999	2001 →

The 2000 North Queensland Cowboys season was the 6th in the club's history. Coached by Tim Sheens and captained by new signing Tim Brasher, they competed in the National Rugby League's 2000 Telstra Premiership, finishing in last place.

== Season summary ==
The Cowboys entered the new millennium with a renewed sense of hope, adding veterans Tim Brasher and Julian O'Neill from the South Sydney Rabbitohs, with Brasher becoming the club's fifth captain.

The competition started a month earlier due to the Sydney Olympics being held later that year. Because of this, the side played their first month away from home. It was a disastrous away trip, with the club losing their first three games. They managed a win on their final away game against Parramatta but were later stripped of the two competition points after fielding a fourteenth player for three minutes.

After two straight losses, back-to-back wins followed, which included the club's biggest ever victory at the time, a 50-10 win over the Northern Eagles. It was the first time the club had scored 50 points in a game. Five rounds later they recorded 50 points again, breaking their biggest winning margin record with a 50-4 victory over St George Illawarra. It would be one of the last bright spots of the season, as the club managed just two wins from the final 13 rounds and ended the season in last place.

Paul Green represented Queensland in State of Origin once again, and was joined by O'Neill and Paul Bowman, who made his first appearance for the Maroons. Brasher was selected for New South Wales, becoming the club's first Blues' representative.

Despite playing State of Origin, Green was sacked halfway through the season for allegedly negotiating with other clubs while still under contract. He would subsequently win an out-of-court settlement against the club. In a further blow to the club, homegrown halfback Scott Prince, who made his debut at 18 and played 53 games for the side, departed at the end of the season for rivals, the Brisbane Broncos.

=== Milestones ===
- Round 1: Tim Brasher, Glenn Morrison, Jason Nicol, Julian O'Neill and Robert Relf made their debuts for the club.
- Round 1: Nathan Fien made his NRL debut.
- Round 3: Graham Appo made his debut for the club.
- Round 4: Jeremy Schloss made his debut for the club.
- Round 5: Paul Bowman played his 50th game for the club.
- Round 6: Martin Locke played his 50th game for the club.
- Round 7: Des Clark made his debut for the club.
- Round 11: John Buttigieg played his 50th game for the club.
- Round 12: Grant Reibel made his NRL debut.
- Round 16: Shane Kenward made his debut for the club.
- Round 16: Naipolioni Kuricibi made his NRL debut.
- Round 18: Jamie McDonald made his debut for the club.
- Round 18: Daniel Strickland made his NRL debut.
- Round 23: Scott Prince played his 50th game for the club.
- Round 25: Bruce Mamando made his debut for the club.

== Squad List ==
North Queensland Cowboys NRL Squad 2000
First team squad				Coaching staff
Jimmy Ahmat – FB; Graham Appo – WG; Geoff Bell – CE; Greg Bourke – WG; Paul Bowman – CE; Brett Boyd – HK; Tim Brasher (c) – FB; John Buttigieg – PR; Des Clark – PR; Adam Connelly – WG; Paul Dezolt – HK; Darrien Doherty – PR; Scott Donald – WG	John Doyle – HK; Nathan Fien – HB; Noel Goldthorpe – HB; Paul Green – FE; Chad Halliday – CE; Josh Hannay – CE; Brett Hetherington – PR; Brian Jellick – WG; Peter Jones – LK; Shane Kenward – FB; Naipolioni Kuricibi – WG; Denny Lambert – HB; Martin Locke – PR	Jamie McDonald – PR; Leigh McWilliams – HK; Bruce Mamando – PR; John Manning – SR; Glenn Morrison – SR; Shane Muspratt – FE; Jason Nicol – SR; Julian O'Neill – CE; Nick Paterson – PR; Paul Pensini – PR; Scott Prince – FE; Ben Rauter – SR; Grant Reibel – PR	Robert Relf – SR; Jeremy Schloss – LK; Mark Shipway – SR; Damien Smith – WG; Daniel Strickland – SR; Shaun Valentine – PR; Kyle Warren – SR	Head coach: Tim Sheens; Assistant coach: Murray Hurst (assistant coach); Legend: (c) Captain(s); (vc) Vice-captain(s)

== Squad Movement ==
=== 2000 Gains ===
Player	Signed from
Graham Appo	Sydney Roosters
Tim Brasher	South Sydney Rabbitohs
Des Clark	St. Helens
Shane Kenward	Wakefield Trinity Wildcats
Bruce Mamando	Sydney Roosters
Glenn Morrison	North Sydney Bears
Jason Nicol	South Sydney Rabbitohs
Julian O'Neill	South Sydney Rabbitohs
Robert Relf	Canterbury Bulldogs
Jeremy Schloss	South Sydney Rabbitohs

=== 2000 Losses ===
Player	Signed To
Scott Asimus	Northern Eagles
Jody Gall	Penrith Panthers
Paul Green	Released (mid-season)
John Lomax	Melbourne Storm
Glen Murphy	Retired
Noa Nadruku	Retired
Jason Nicol	Salford City Reds (mid-season)
Craig Smith	Wests Panthers
Kris Tassell	Salford City Reds
Scott Whiting	Wests Panthers
George Wilson	Redcliffe Dolphins

== Ladder ==
2000 NRL season
Pos	Team	Pld	W	D	L	PF	PA	PD	Pts	Qualification
1	Brisbane Broncos (P)	26	18	2	6	696	388	+308	38	Advance to finals series
2	Sydney Roosters	26	16	0	10	601	520	+81	32	Advance to finals series
3	Newcastle Knights	26	15	1	10	686	532	+154	31	Advance to finals series
4	Canberra Raiders	26	15	0	11	506	479	+27	30	Advance to finals series
5	Penrith Panthers	26	15	0	11	573	562	+11	30	Advance to finals series
6	Melbourne Storm	26	14	1	11	672	529	+143	29	Advance to finals series
7	Parramatta Eels	26	14	1	11	476	456	+20	29	Advance to finals series
8	Cronulla-Sutherland Sharks	26	13	0	13	570	463	+107	26	Advance to finals series
9	St George Illawarra Dragons	26	12	0	14	576	656	−80	24	
10	Wests Tigers	26	11	2	13	519	642	−123	24	
11	Canterbury-Bankstown Bulldogs	26	10	1	15	469	553	−84	21	
12	Northern Eagles	26	9	0	17	476	628	−152	18	
13	Auckland Warriors	26	8	2	16	426	662	−236	18	
14	North Queensland Cowboys	26	7	0	19	436	612	−176	12 (Note: North Queensland were stripped of two competition points due to a breach of the interchange rule in round 4.)	

Source: RLP
(P) Premiers

== Fixtures ==
=== Regular season ===
Date	Round	Opponent	Venue	Score	Tries	Goals	Attendance
7 February	Round 1	Penrith Panthers	Penrith Stadium	6 – 19	Brasher	O'Neill (1/3)	10,623
12 February	Round 2	St George Illawarra Dragons	WIN Stadium	6 – 12	Bowman	O'Neill (1/1)	6,024
19 February	Round 3	Sydney Roosters	SFS	12 – 32	Bowman, Relf	O'Neill (2/2)	5,820
28 February	Round 4	Parramatta Eels	Parramatta Stadium	26 – 18	Warren (2), Bell, Smith	O'Neill (5/6)	10,110
4 March	Round 5	Cronulla Sharks	Dairy Farmers Stadium	12 – 26	Appo, Valentine	O'Neill (2/2)	15,890
11 March	Round 6	Brisbane Broncos	Dairy Farmers Stadium	8 – 50	Warren	Appo (1/1), O'Neill (1/1)	27,643
19 March	Round 7	Canterbury Bulldogs	Stadium Australia	18 – 8	Brasher (2), Bowman	O'Neill (3/3)	6,572
25 March	Round 8	Northern Eagles	Dairy Farmers Stadium	50 – 10	Bell (2), Appo, Bowman, Boyd, Green, O'Neill, Smith	O'Neill (9/10)	13,164
1 April	Round 9	Melbourne Storm	Olympic Park	6 – 28	Doyle	O'Neill (1/2)	13,697
9 April	Round 10	Newcastle Knights	Marathon Stadium	6 – 28	Appo	Appo (1/1)	19,210
15 April	Round 11	Auckland Warriors	Dairy Farmers Stadium	12 – 18	Smith	O'Neill (4/4)	13,557
22 April	Round 12	Wests Tigers	Leichhardt Oval	18 – 8	Bell, Green, O'Neill	O'Neill (3/5)	7,517
29 April	Round 13	St George Illawarra Dragons	Dairy Farmers Stadium	50 – 4	Connelly (2), Bowman, Brasher, Green, McWilliams, Relf, Schloss	O'Neill (9/10)	13,768
6 May	Round 14	Canterbury Bulldogs	Dairy Farmers Stadium	12 – 32	Connelly, Donald	O'Neill (2/4)	15,597
13 May	Round 15	Canberra Raiders	Bruce Stadium	10 – 17	Prince	O'Neill (3/4)	7,110
21 May	Round 16	Newcastle Knights	Dairy Farmers Stadium	10 – 18	Appo, Prince	Appo (1/3)	15,738
27 May	Round 17	Parramatta Eels	Dairy Farmers Stadium	6 – 20	Bowman	O'Neill (1/2)	12,657
3 June	Round 18	Cronulla Sharks	Toyota Park	6 – 42	Relf	Prince (1/1)	11,101
10 June	Round 19	Brisbane Broncos	ANZ Stadium	16 – 26	Bell, Manning	Prince (4/4)	10,455
17 June	Round 20	Penrith Panthers	Dairy Farmers Stadium	28 – 12	Connelly, Morrison, O'Neill, Prince	O'Neill (6/8)	10,851
25 June	Round 21	Northern Eagles	NorthPower Stadium	12 – 24	Jellick	O'Neill (1/1), Prince (1/1)	8,206
1 July	Round 22	Melbourne Storm	Dairy Farmers Stadium	22 – 26	Prince (2), Jones, Schloss	O'Neill (3/5)	17,192
9 July	Round 23	Wests Tigers	Dairy Farmers Stadium	38 – 26	Bowman (2), Jones, Manning, Schloss, Warren	Prince (7/8)	14,134
15 July	Round 24	Auckland Warriors	Ericsson Stadium	12 – 44	Warren (2)	O'Neill (2/2)	8,105
22 July	Round 25	Sydney Roosters	Dairy Farmers Stadium	20 – 36	Fien, Kuricibi, Prince	O'Neill (4/5)	14,894
29 July	Round 26	Canberra Raiders	Dairy Farmers Stadium	14 – 28	Fien, Manning	O'Neill (3/3)	16,553
Legend: Win Loss Draw Bye

== Statistics ==
Name	App	T	G	FG	Pts
Graham Appo	15	4	3	-	2
Geoff Bell	12	5	-	-	20
Greg Bourke	3	-	-	-	-
Paul Bowman	20	8	-	-	32
Brett Boyd	10	1	-	-	4
Tim Brasher	16	4	-	-	16
John Buttigieg	22	-	-	-	-
Des Clark	2	-	-	-	-
Adam Connelly	11	4	-	-	16
Paul Dezolt	4	-	-	-	-
Darrien Doherty	1	-	-	-	-
Scott Donald	2	1	-	-	4
John Doyle	3	1	-	-	4
Nathan Fien	16	2	-	-	8
Noel Goldthorpe	12	-	-	-	-
Paul Green	15	3	-	-	12
Chad Halliday	4	-	-	-	-
Josh Hannay	5	-	-	-	-
Brett Hetherington	1	-	-	-	-
Brian Jellick	13	1	-	-	4
Peter Jones	20	3	-	-	12
Shane Kenward	2	-	-	-	-
Naipolioni Kuricibi	4	1	-	-	4
Martin Locke	9	-	-	-	-
Jamie McDonald	2	-	-	-	-
Leigh McWilliams	12	1	-	-	4
Bruce Mamando	1	-	-	-	-
John Manning	10	3	-	-	12
Glenn Morrison	20	1	-	-	4
Shane Muspratt	2	-	-	-	-
Jason Nicol	3	-	-	-	-
Julian O'Neill	24	3	66	-	144
Nick Paterson	1	-	-	-	-
Paul Pensini	4	-	-	-	-
Scott Prince	19	6	13	-	50
Ben Rauter	6	-	-	-	-
Grant Reibel	2	-	-	-	-
Robert Relf	24	3	-	-	12
Jeremy Schloss	18	3	-	-	12
Mark Shipway	23	-	-	-	-
Damien Smith	15	3	-	-	12
Daniel Strickland	6	-	-	-	-
Shaun Valentine	18	1	-	-	4
Kyle Warren	18	6	-	-	24
Totals		68	82	-	436

== Representatives ==
The following players played a representative match in 2000.

	State of Origin 1	State of Origin 2	State of Origin 3	World Cup
Geoff Bell	-	-	-	Scotland
Paul Bowman	Queensland	Queensland	Queensland	-
Tim Brasher	-	New South Wales	New South Wales	-
Paul Green	Queensland	Queensland	-	-
Brian Jellick	-	-	-	New Zealand
Bruce Mamando	-	-	-	Papua New Guinea
Julian O'Neill	-	Queensland	Queensland	-

== Honours ==
=== Club ===
- Player(s) of the Year: Paul Bowman and Julian O'Neill
- Players' Player: Tim Brasher
- Club Person of the Year: Cowboys' Supporters Team

== Feeder Clubs ==
=== NSWRL First Division ===
- North Queensland Cowboys - Unknown
