= 2001 North Queensland Cowboys season =

Coordinates: 19°18′58″S 146°42′43″E

- NRL Rank: 13th
- Play-off result: Missed finals
- 2001 record: Wins: 6; draws: 2; losses: 18
- Points scored: For: 514; against: 771

Team information
- Coach: Tim Sheens (resigned on 25 May); Murray Hurst
- Captain: Paul Bowman
- Stadium: Dairy Farmers Stadium
- Avg. attendance: 13,133
- High attendance: 21,729 (vs. Brisbane Broncos, Round 1)

Top scorers
- Tries: Glenn Morrison (13)
- Goals: Julian O'Neill (56)
- Points: Julian O'Neill (156)
← 2000	2002 →

The 2001 North Queensland Cowboys season was the 7th in the club's history. Coached by Tim Sheens and captained by Paul Bowman, they competed in the NRL's 2001 Telstra Premiership.

Following a mid-season club taker over by News Limited, Sheens resigned as head coach on 25 May and was replaced by his assistant, Murray Hurst.

== Season summary ==
2001 was another season that started with high hopes but ended in disaster for the club. It got off to an awful start before a ball was even kicked, when club captain Tim Brasher injured his knee in the pre-season, resulting in a complete reconstruction and ruling him out for the year. The club struggled to replace the outgoing Scott Prince in the halves and Brasher at fullback, winning just two games after 11 games to sit in last place on the ladder.

Their Round 6 win over the Wests Tigers was shrouded in controversy when Tigers' winger John Hopoate, in an attempt to unsettle several of his opponents, inserted his finger in three players' anuses, the first occurring during the seventh minute of play. Hopoate was subsequently suspended for 12 games.

Following the Round 11 loss to the Canterbury Bulldogs, Tim Sheens took a period of stress-leave and later resigned from the club on 25 May after News Limited took full control of the club. He was replaced by his assistant, former Tongan national team coach Murray Hurst.

The change did little to alter the fortunes of the side, winning just four of their last 15 games. A win in Round 26 over the Warriors in Auckland spared the side of a second straight wooden spoon, finishing ahead of the Penrith Panthers on points differential.

Despite the issues on and off the field, there were a number of bright spots throughout the season, including the emergence of Matthew Bowen. Bowen, who made his debut in Round 2, would go onto play 270 games, scoring 130 tries, and representing Australia and Queensland during his 13-year career at the club. Another positive was the selection of four players in the victorious Queensland squad for the 2001 State of Origin series, the most for the club at the time. All four players selected (Paul Bowman, John Buttigieg, John Doyle and Nathan Fien) were local products who came through the junior ranks of the club.

=== Milestones ===
- Round 1: Tim Maddison and Lee Oudenryn made their debuts for the club.
- Round 1: Matthew Bowen and Trent Leis made their NRL debuts.
- Round 4: Adam Nable made his debut for the club.
- Round 4: Tarin Bradford and Chris Sheppard made their NRL debuts.
- Round 7: Chris Muckert made his NRL debut.
- Round 10: Micheal Luck made his NRL debut.
- Round 11: Peter Jones became the first player to play 100 games for the club.
- Round 13: John Doyle played his 50th game for the club.
- Round 19: George Gatis made his NRL debut.
- Round 13: Josh Hannay played his 50th game for the club.
- Round 25: Danny Moore made his debut for the club.

== Squad List ==
North Queensland Cowboys NRL Squad 2001
First team squad				Coaching staff
John Andrews – FB; Geoff Bell – CE; Matthew Bowen – FB; Paul Bowman (c) – CE; Tarin Bradford – WG; Tim Brasher – FB; John Buttigieg – PR; Adam Connelly – WG; Paul Dezolt – HK; Darrien Doherty – PR; John Doyle – HK; Nathan Fien – HB	George Gatis – HK; Josh Hannay – CE; Brett Hetherington – SR; Brian Jellick – WG; Peter Jones – SR; Naipolioni Kuricibi – WG; Denny Lambert – HB; Trent Leis – WG; Micheal Luck – SR; Tim Maddison – PR; Bruce Mamando – PR; John Manning – SR	Jamie McDonald – PR; Justin McKay – HB; Leigh McWilliams – HK; Danny Moore – CE; Glenn Morrison – LK; Chris Muckert – SR; Shane Muspratt – HK; Adam Nable – HK; Julian O'Neill – FB; Lee Oudenryn – WG; Nick Paterson – PR; Paul Pensini – PR	Grant Reibel – PR; Robert Relf – PR; John Rowbotham – LK; Chris Sheppard – FE; Mark Shipway – CE; Damien Smith – CE; Daniel Strickland – SR; Shaun Valentine – SR; Kyle Warren – SR; Scott Whiting – CE; Ty Williams – WG	Head coach: Tim Sheens; Assistant coach: Murray Hurst (assistant coach); Legend: (c) Captain(s); (vc) Vice-captain(s)

== Squad Movement ==
=== 2001 Gains ===
Player	Signed from
Trent Leis	Redcliffe Dolphins
Tim Maddison	Cronulla Sharks
Danny Moore	London Broncos (mid-season)
Adam Nable	Wests Tigers
Lee Oudenryn	Auckland Warriors
Scott Whiting	Wests Panthers

=== 2001 Losses ===
Player	Signed To
Graham Appo	Huddersfield Giants
Greg Bourke	Burleigh Bears
Brett Boyd	Retired
Des Clark	Retired
Darrien Doherty	Retired
Scott Donald	Parramatta Eels
Noel Goldthorpe	Retired
Chad Halliday	Parramatta Eels
Shane Kenward	Retired
Martin Locke	Retired
Scott Prince	Brisbane Broncos
Ben Rauter	Wakefield Trinity Wildcats
Jeremy Schloss	Retired

== Ladder ==
2001 NRL season
Pos	Team	Pld	W	D	L	PF	PA	PD	Pts
1	Parramatta Eels	26	20	2	4	839	406	+433	42
2	Canterbury-Bankstown Bulldogs	26	17	3	6	617	568	+49	37
3	Newcastle Knights (P)	26	16	1	9	782	639	+143	33
4	Cronulla-Sutherland Sharks	26	15	2	9	594	513	+81	32
5	Brisbane Broncos	26	14	1	11	696	511	+185	29
6	Sydney Roosters	26	13	1	12	647	589	+58	27
7	St. George Illawarra Dragons	26	12	2	12	661	573	+88	26
8	New Zealand Warriors	26	12	2	12	638	629	+9	26
9	Melbourne Storm	26	11	1	14	704	725	-21	23
10	Northern Eagles	26	11	1	14	603	750	-147	23
11	Canberra Raiders	26	9	1	16	600	623	-23	19
12	Wests Tigers	26	9	1	16	474	746	-272	19
13	North Queensland Cowboys	26	6	2	18	514	771	-257	14
14	Penrith Panthers	26	7	0	19	521	847	-326	14

== Fixtures ==
=== Regular season ===
Date	Round	Opponent	Venue	Score	Tries	Goals	Attendance
17 February	Round 1	Brisbane Broncos	Dairy Farmers Stadium	17 – 18	Morrison, O'Neill	O'Neill (4/5), Fien (1 FG)	21,729
24 February	Round 2	Melbourne Storm	Colonial Stadium	32 – 28	Strickland (2), Buttigieg, Fien, O'Neill, Relf	O'Neill (4/7)	12,321
3 March	Round 3	Sydney Roosters	Dairy Farmers Stadium	8 – 32	Buttigieg, Morrison	O'Neill (0/2)	19,263
10 March	Round 4	Penrith Panthers	Cazaly's Stadium	18 – 32	Hannay, Morrison, Relf	O'Neill (3/3)	13,500
17 March	Round 5	Cronulla Sharks	Toyota Park	16 – 24	Bowman, Morrison, Relf	O'Neill (2/3)	10,250
24 March	Round 6	Wests Tigers	Dairy Farmers Stadium	24 – 10	Bowman, Buttigieg, O'Neill, Shipway	O'Neill (4/6)	12,357
1 April	Round 7	St George Illawarra Dragons	WIN Stadium	12 – 48	Fien, Warren	O'Neill (2/2)	9,583
7 April	Round 8	Parramatta Eels	Dairy Farmers Stadium	14 – 14	Bowman, Buttigieg, Warren	O'Neill (1/4)	12,949
15 April	Round 9	Canberra Raiders	Bruce Stadium	26 – 34	Bowen, Doyle, Leis, Morrison, Warren	Leis (3/4), O'Neill (0/1)	7,191
22 April	Round 10	Northern Eagles	Cazaly's Stadium	22 – 24	Bowen, Fien, O'Neill	O'Neill (5/5)	6,113
28 April	Round 11	Canterbury Bulldogs	Dairy Farmers Stadium	14 – 26	Jellick, Morrison	O'Neill (3/3)	9,820
13 May	Round 12	Newcastle Knights	Marathon Stadium	34 – 42	Bowman (2), Jellick, Morrison, Paterson, Warren	Leis (4/4), O'Neill (1/2)	18,039
20 May	Round 13	Warriors	Dairy Farmers Stadium	35 – 18	Leis (2), Bowman, Fien, Luck, Morrison	Leis (3/6), O'Neill (2/3), Fien (1 FG)	10,819
27 May	Round 14	Brisbane Broncos	ANZ Stadium	6 – 50	Fien	Leis (1/1)	14,714
2 June	Round 15	Melbourne Storm	Dairy Farmers Stadium	24 – 38	O'Neill (3), Bowen	Leis (4/5)	10,987
16 June	Round 16	Sydney Roosters	SFS	24 – 50	Bowman, Morrison, O'Neill, Shipway, Warren	Leis (1/2), O'Neill (1/3)	6,432
23 June	Round 17	Penrith Panthers	Penrith Stadium	26 – 20	Doyle, Hannay, Luck, O'Neill	O'Neill (5/5)	7,326
7 July	Round 18	Cronulla Sharks	Dairy Farmers Stadium	6 – 36	Maddison	O'Neill (1/1)	13,494
14 July	Round 19	Wests Tigers	Leichhardt Oval	18 – 20	Jellick, Leis, Morrison, O'Neill	O'Neill (1/4)	4,724
21 July	Round 20	St George Illawarra Dragons	Dairy Farmers Stadium	34 – 10	Bowman, Hannay, Jellick, Jones, Leis, Morrison	Leis (5/7)	14,293
29 July	Round 21	Parramatta Eels	Parramatta Stadium	0 – 62			13,192
4 August	Round 22	Canberra Raiders	Dairy Farmers Stadium	10 – 29	Bowman, Jones	O'Neill (1/2)	11,261
12 August	Round 23	Northern Eagles	Brookvale Oval	24 – 24	Bowman (2), Bowen, Jellick, Morrison	O'Neill (2/5), Bowen (0/1)	8,009
18 August	Round 24	Canterbury Bulldogs	Sydney Showground	22 – 30	Bowen, Bowman, Jones	O'Neill (4/5), Bowen (1/1)	6,715
25 August	Round 25	Newcastle Knights	Dairy Farmers Stadium	18 – 34	Morrison, O'Neill, Relf	O'Neill (3/3)	14,147
2 September	Round 26	Warriors	Ericsson Stadium	30 – 18	Gatis (2), Bowen, Relf	O'Neill (7/8)	24,568
Legend: Win Loss Draw Bye

== Statistics ==
Name	App	T	G	FG	Pts
Geoff Bell	10	-	-	-	-
Matthew Bowen	15	6	1	-	26
Paul Bowman	25	12	-	-	48
Tarin Bradford	2	-	-	-	-
John Buttigieg	15	4	-	-	16
Adam Connelly	7	-	-	-	-
Paul Dezolt	5	-	-	-	-
John Doyle	11	2	-	-	8
Nathan Fien	26	5	-	2	22
George Gatis	8	2	-	-	8
Josh Hannay	12	3	-	-	12
Brett Hetherington	7	-	-	-	-
Brian Jellick	17	5	-	-	20
Peter Jones	24	3	-	-	12
Naipolioni Kuricibi	1	-	-	-	-
Trent Leis	17	5	21	-	62
Micheal Luck	16	2	-	-	8
Tim Maddison	19	1	-	-	4
Bruce Mamando	1	-	-	-	-
John Manning	1	-	-	-	-
Jamie McDonald	13	-	-	-	-
Leigh McWilliams	3	-	-	-	-
Danny Moore	2	-	-	-	-
Glenn Morrison	23	13	-	-	52
Chris Muckert	10	-	-	-	-
Shane Muspratt	12	-	-	-	-
Adam Nable	1	-	-	-	-
Julian O'Neill	23	11	56	-	156
Lee Oudenryn	3	-	-	-	-
Nick Paterson	12	1	-	-	4
Paul Pensini	2	-	-	-	-
Robert Relf	21	5	-	-	20
Chris Sheppard	17	-	-	-	-
Mark Shipway	17	2	-	-	8
Damien Smith	3	-	-	-	-
Daniel Strickland	17	2	-	-	8
Shaun Valentine	7	-	-	-	-
Kyle Warren	17	5	-	-	20
Totals		89	78	2	514

== Representatives ==
The following players played a representative match in 2001.

	City vs Country	State of Origin 1	State of Origin 2	State of Origin 3
Paul Bowman	-	Queensland	Queensland	Queensland
John Buttigieg	-	Queensland	-	Queensland
John Doyle	-	Queensland	-	Queensland
Nathan Fien	-	-	Queensland	-
Glenn Morrison	Country	-	-	-

== Honours ==
=== Club ===
- Player of the Year: Glenn Morrison
- Players' Player: Glenn Morrison
- Club Person of the Year: Peter Jones

== Feeder Clubs ==
=== NSWRL First Division ===
- North Queensland Cowboys - 4th, lost semi final
