= 2002 North Queensland Cowboys season =

Coordinates: 19°18′58″S 146°42′43″E

- NRL Rank: 11th
- Play-off result: Missed finals
- 2002 record: Wins: 8; draws: 0; losses: 16
- Points scored: For: 496; against: 803

Team information
- CEO: Denis Keeffe
- Coach: Murray Hurst (sacked on 3 April); Graham Murray
- Captain: Paul Bowman
- Stadium: Dairy Farmers Stadium
- Avg. attendance: 12,133
- High attendance: 24,212 (vs. Brisbane Broncos, Round 1)

Top scorers
- Tries: Matt Sing (16)
- Goals: Josh Hannay (48)
- Points: Josh Hannay (108)
← 2001	2003 →

The 2002 North Queensland Cowboys season was the 8th in the club's history. Coached by Murray Hurst and captained by Paul Bowman, they competed in the NRL's 2002 Telstra Premiership. Graham Murray replaced Hurst after three rounds and helped the club to their highest finish (11th) and most competition points (20) at the time.

== Season summary ==
The Cowboys underwent another rebuild in 2002 following a disastrous 2001 season. A number of players were moved on, with the key recruit being former Australian and Queensland winger Matt Sing. Sing was an instant success for the club, finishing the 2002 season as the team's top try scorer and being named their Player of the Year. He would later earn his way back into representative sides, becoming a club legend for the Cowboys, being named in their 10th and 20th Anniversary Teams and an inaugural inductee into their Hall of Fame in 2016.

The 2002 season began with three straight losses and looked to be even worse than the year before. Following their Round 3 defeat to the Melbourne Storm, coach Murray Hurst was sacked and replaced by former Sydney Roosters boss Graham Murray, who had taken the Roosters to the Grand Final just two years earlier. Another key piece of their rebuild, Murray would later lead the club to their first finals series and first Grand Final, and was their most successful head coach until the arrival of Paul Green.

Although the success was not instant, the signs were there, as the side won three of their first six games under Murray. Five straights losses soon followed, before ending the year with four wins from their final seven games, giving hope for the 2003 season. The club finished the regular season in 11th, their highest ever finish, with 20 competition points, also a record.

Off the field, Peter Parr joined the club as football manager for the 2002 season. A former administrator with the Perth Reds and Brisbane Broncos, Parr later held the positions of CEO and General Manager and was instrumental in the club's future successes and bringing players, such as Johnathan Thurston, to the club.

2002 also saw the retirement of club stalwart and foundation player Peter Jones, who held the club's most games record until 2004. Jones, the first player to play 100 games for the club, would remain on the Cowboys football operations staff until the end of 2012. While one club great retired, another emerged, with Aaron Payne making his debut in Round 12. Payne would go onto play 219 games for the club and start at hooker in their first ever Grand Final appearance in 2005.

=== Milestones ===
- Round 1: Ken McGuinness, Matt Sing and David Thompson made their debuts for the club.
- Round 1: Matt Petersen made his NRL debut.
- Round 4: Ashley Alberts and Ty Williams made their NRL debuts.
- Round 5: Jaiman Lowe made his NRL debut.
- Round 7: Glenn Morrison played his 50th game for the club.
- Round 8: Nathan Fien played his 50th game for the club.
- Round 10: Ben Laity made his NRL debut.
- Round 12: Aaron Payne and Simon Phillips made their NRL debuts.
- Round 15: Tevita Amone made his debut for the club.
- Round 19: Derrick Watkins made his NRL debut.
- Round 21: Paul Bowman played his 100th game for the club.

== Squad List ==
North Queensland Cowboys NRL Squad 2002
First team squad			Coaching staff
Ashley Alberts – CE; Tevita Amone – PR; Matthew Bowen – FB; Paul Bowman (c) – CE; Tarin Bradford – WG; Tim Brasher – FB; John Buttigieg – PR; Paul Dezolt – HK; John Doyle – HK; Nathan Fien – HB; George Gatis – HK; Josh Hannay – CE; Peter Jones – SR	Ben Laity – PR; Jaiman Lowe – PR; Micheal Luck – SR; Tim Maddison – PR; John Manning – SR; Jamie McDonald – PR; Ken McGuinness – CE; Justin McKay – HB; Leigh McWilliams – HK; Glenn Morrison – LK; Chris Muckert – SR; Shane Muspratt – HK; Aaron Payne – HB	Matt Petersen – WG; Simon Phillips – WG; Grant Reibel – PR; Chris Sheppard – FE; Matt Sing – WG; Daniel Strickland – SR; David Thompson – PR; Shaun Valentine – SR; Derrick Watkins – LK; Scott Whiting – CE; Ty Williams – WG	Head coach: Graham Murray; Assistant coach: Neil Henry (assistant coach); Legend: (c) Captain(s); (vc) Vice-captain(s)

== Squad Movement ==
=== 2002 Gains ===
Player	Signed from
Tevita Amone	Western Suburbs Magpies (mid-season)
Ken McGuinness	Toowoomba Clydesdales
Matt Petersen	Newcastle Knights
Matt Sing	Sydney Roosters
David Thompson	Canterbury Bulldogs

=== 2002 Losses ===
Player	Signed To
John Andrews	Released
Geoff Bell	Penrith Panthers
Adam Connelly	ACT Griffins (rugby union)
Brett Hetherington	Retired
Brian Jellick	Limoux Grizzlies
Denny Lambert	Pia Donkeys
Trent Leis	Redcliffe Dolphins
Naipolioni Kuricibi	Retired
Bruce Mamando	Retired
Danny Moore	Retired
Adam Nable	Pia Donkeys
Julian O'Neill	Wigan Warriors
Lee Oudenryn	Retired
Nick Paterson	Cronulla Sharks
Matt Petersen	Parramatta Eels (mid-season)
Paul Pensini	Released
Robert Relf	Widnes Vikings
Johnny Rowbotham	Released
Mark Shipway	Northern Eagles
Damien Smith	Retired
Kyle Warren	Castleford Tigers

== Ladder ==
2002 NRL season
Pos	Team	Pld	W	D	L	B	PF	PA	PD	Pts
1	New Zealand Warriors	24	17	0	7	2	688	454	+234	38
2	Newcastle Knights	24	17	0	7	2	724	498	+226	38
3	Brisbane Broncos	24	16	1	7	2	672	425	+247	37
4	Sydney Roosters (P)	24	15	1	8	2	621	405	+216	35
5	Cronulla-Sutherland Sharks	24	15	0	9	2	653	597	+56	34
6	Parramatta Eels	24	10	2	12	2	531	440	+91	26
7	St George Illawarra Dragons	24	9	3	12	2	632	546	+86	25
8	Canberra Raiders	24	10	1	13	2	471	641	-170	25
9	Northern Eagles	24	10	0	14	2	503	740	-237	24
10	Melbourne Storm	24	9	1	14	2	556	586	-30	23
11	North Queensland Cowboys	24	8	0	16	2	496	803	-307	20
12	Penrith Panthers	24	7	0	17	2	546	654	-108	18
13	Wests Tigers	24	7	0	17	2	498	642	-144	18
14	South Sydney Rabbitohs	24	5	0	19	2	385	817	-432	14
15	Canterbury-Bankstown Bulldogs	24	20	1	3	2	707	435	+272	8^{1}

^{1} The Bulldogs were deducted 37 premiership points due to gross salary cap breaches.

== Fixtures ==
=== Regular season ===
Date	Round	Opponent	Venue	Score	Tries	Goals	Attendance
16 March	Round 1	Brisbane Broncos	Dairy Farmers Stadium	6 – 42	Doyle	Hannay (1/1)	24,212
23 March	Round 2	Newcastle Knights	EnergyAustralia Stadium	18 – 50	Bradford, Petersen, Matt Sing	Hannay (3/3)	14,868
30 March	Round 3	Melbourne Storm	Olympic Park	10 – 38	Hannay, Morrison	Hannay (1/2)	8,828
6 April	Round 4	Warriors	Dairy Farmers Stadium	20 – 50	Morrison (2), Bowen, Hannay	Hannay (2/4)	9,657
13 April	Round 5	South Sydney Rabbitohs	Dairy Farmers Stadium	30 – 18	Bowen, Bradford, Morrison, Muspratt, Williams	Hannay (5/6)	11,014
21 April	Round 6	Sydney Roosters	Aussie Stadium	12 – 58	Fien, Sing	Morrison (2/2)	7,318
27 April	Round 7	Penrith Panthers	Penrith Stadium	28 – 18	Fien (2), Bowen, Petersen, Williams	Morrison (4/5)	8.759
5 May	Round 8	Parramatta Eels	Parramatta Stadium	19 – 20	Doyle, Morrison, Sing	Morrison (3/5), Fien (1 FG)	11,174
11 May	Round 9	Wests Tigers	Dairy Farmers Stadium	40 – 16	Bowen (2), Sing (2), Fien, Hannay, McGuinness	Hannay (6/9)	13,089
18 May	Round 10	Penrith Panthers	Dairy Farmers Stadium	8 – 38	Bowman	Hannay (2/2)	10,512
26 May	Round 11	Canberra Raiders	Canberra Stadium	20 – 32	Sing (2), Alberts, Gatis	Bowen (2/4)	7,128
1 June	Round 12	St George Illawarra Dragons	Dairy Farmers Stadium	40 – 32	Bowman (2), Gatis, Peter Jones, Morrison, Sing, Williams	Morrison (6/7)	10,561
9 June	Round 13	Warriors	Ericsson Stadium	6 – 34	Phillips	Morrison (1/1)	14,616
16 June	Round 14	Brisbane Broncos	ANZ Stadium	8 – 52	Bowen, Bowman	Bowen (0/1), Hannay (0/1)	10,215
22 June	Round 15	Cronulla Sharks	Dairy Farmers Stadium	16 – 46	Bowen, Muckert, Sing	Hannay (2/3)	13,568
29 June	Round 16	St George Illawarra Dragons	WIN Stadium	18 – 45	Bowen, Fien, Sing	Hannay (3/3)	7,987
	Round 17	Bye					
13 July	Round 18	Northern Eagles	Dairy Farmers Stadium	12 – 28	Bowen, Sing	Hannay (2/2)	8,505
20 July	Round 19	Canberra Raiders	Dairy Farmers Stadium	34 – 18	Sing (2), Bowen, Bowman, Muckert, Williams	Hannay (5/6)	8,121
28 July	Round 20	Northern Eagles	Brookvale Oval	30 – 18	Williams (2), Bowman, Dezolt, Maddison	Hannay (3/6)	6,520
3 August	Round 21	Canterbury Bulldogs	Dairy Farmers Stadium	26 – 34	Bowman (2), Dezolt, Morrison	Hannay (5/6)	12,231
10 August	Round 22	Melbourne Storm	Dairy Farmers Stadium	30 – 40	Sing (2), Bowen, Dezolt, Fien, Sheppard	Bowen (3/4), Hannay (0/2)	9,238
	Round 23	Bye					
24 August	Round 24	Cronulla Sharks	Toyota Park	14 – 36	Bowman, Dezolt, Williams	Hannay (1/3)	12,658
31 August	Round 25	South Sydney Rabbitohs	Aussie Stadium	36 – 34	Williams (3), Bowen, Bowman, Fien, Sing	Hannay (4/7)	9,129
7 September	Round 26	Parramatta Eels	Dairy Farmers Stadium	15 – 6	Williams (2)	Hannay (3/5), Fien (1 FG)	14,892
Legend: Win Loss Draw Bye

== Statistics ==
Name	App	T	G	FG	Pts
Ashley Alberts	5	1	-	-	4
Tevita Amone	3	-	-	-	-
Matthew Bowen	24	12	5	-	58
Paul Bowman	14	10	-	-	40
Tarin Bradford	3	2	-	-	8
Tim Brasher	3	-	-	-	-
John Buttigieg	16	-	-	-	-
Paul Dezolt	8	4	-	-	16
John Doyle	11	2	-	-	8
Nathan Fien	24	7	-	2	30
George Gatis	15	1	-	-	4
Josh Hannay	19	3	48	-	108
Peter Jones	18	1	-	-	4
Ben Laity	1	-	-	-	-
Jaiman Lowe	16	-	-	-	-
Micheal Luck	18	-	-	-	-
Tim Maddison	8	1	-	-	4
Jamie McDonald	12	-	-	-	-
Ken McGuinness	9	1	-	-	4
Leigh McWilliams	9	-	-	-	-
Glenn Morrison	15	7	16	-	60
Chris Muckert	13	2	-	-	8
Shane Muspratt	17	1	-	-	4
Aaron Payne	5	-	-	-	-
Matt Petersen	8	2	-	-	8
Simon Phillips	4	1	-	-	4
Grant Reibel	3	-	-	-	-
Chris Sheppard	9	1	-	-	4
Matt Sing	23	16	-	-	64
Daniel Strickland	13	-	-	-	-
David Thompson	21	-	-	-	-
Shaun Valentine	3	-	-	-	-
Derrick Watkins	2	-	-	-	-
Scott Whiting	13	-	-	-	-
Ty Williams	21	13	-	-	52
Totals		89	69	2	496

== Representatives ==
The following players played a representative match in 2002.

	State of Origin 1	State of Origin 2	State of Origin 3
John Buttigieg	Queensland	-	-
John Doyle	Queensland	-	-

== Honours ==
=== Club ===
- Player of the Year: Matt Sing
- Players' Player: Matt Sing
- Club Person of the Year: Martin Locke

== Feeder Clubs ==
=== Queensland Cup ===
- North Queensland Young Guns - 6th, missed finals
