= 1999 North Queensland Cowboys season =

Coordinates: 19°18′58″S 146°42′43″E

- NRL Rank: 16th
- Play-off result: Missed finals
- 1999 record: Wins: 4; draws: 1; losses: 19
- Points scored: For: 398; against: 588

Team information
- Coach: Tim Sheens
- Captain: Noel Goldthorpe
- Stadium: Dairy Farmers Stadium
- Avg. attendance: 16,108
- High attendance: 30,302 (vs. Brisbane Broncos, Round 8)

Top scorers
- Tries: Brian Jellick, Damien Smith (9)
- Goals: Noel Goldthorpe (28)
- Points: Noel Goldthorpe (60)
← 1998	2000 →

The 1999 North Queensland Cowboys season was the 5th in the club's history. Coached by Tim Sheens and captained by Noel Goldthorpe, they competed in the National Rugby League.

== Season summary ==
Despite undergoing another roster clean-out in the off-season, the Cowboys endured a rough season. After starting the year with a bye, the club went on a five-game losing streak. One of the few positive periods of their season then followed, with a 24-0 win over the Auckland Warriors followed by a 20-20 draw with the Brisbane Broncos and a 20-14 win over the Balmain Tigers. The victory over the Warriors was the first time in club history that they had held a side scoreless. Following the win over Balmain in Round 9, the club won just two of their next 16 games.

The Round 25 victory over the Western Suburbs Magpies turned out to be the club's most important game of the season. Heading into the match, the Cowboys sat in 16th place, one point ahead of the bottom-placed Magpies. A loss would have more than likely seen them finish the year in last place. In Round 26, the Cowboys played the North Sydney Bears in their final ever premiership appearance. The club finished the season in 16th with just four wins, their lowest win total since 1995.

One of the players brought to the club in 1999 was former-Cronulla Sharks halfback Paul Green. In June, Green became the first Cowboys' player to represent Queensland in State of Origin. In 2014, Green returned to the club as head coach, leading them to their maiden premiership victory in 2015.

=== Milestones ===
- Round 2: Geoff Bell, Greg Bourke, Brett Boyd, Darrien Doherty, Jody Gall, Noel Goldthorpe, Paul Green, Brett Hetherington and Matthew Ryan made their debuts for the club.
- Round 3: Chad Halliday and Ben Rauter made their debuts for the club.
- Round 4: Peter Jones played his 50th game for the club.
- Round 4: Paul Dezolt made his NRL debut.
- Round 5: Damien Smith made his debut for the club.
- Round 7: The club held a team scoreless for the first time (def. Auckland, 24-0).
- Round 7: Brian Jellick made his NRL debut.
- Round 9: Adam Connelly made his NRL debut.
- Round 10: George Wilson made his debut for the club.
- Round 14: Scott Asimus and Shaun Valentine made their NRL debuts.
- Round 19: Kyle Warren played his 50th game for the club.
- Round 21: Glen Murphy played his 50th game for the club.
- Round 22: Leigh McWilliams made his NRL debut.
- Round 23: Mark Shipway played his 50th game for the club.
- Round 23: John Manning made his NRL debut.
- Round 24: Shane Muspratt made his NRL debut.
- Round 25: Nick Paterson made his NRL debut.
- Round 26: Craig Smith made his NRL debut.

== Squad list ==
North Queensland Cowboys NRL Squad 1999
First team squad				Coaching staff
Jimmy Ahmat – FB; Scott Asimus – PR; Geoff Bell – CE; Greg Bourke – WG; Paul Bowman – LK; Brett Boyd – HK; John Buttigieg – PR; Adam Connelly – WG; Paul Dezolt – HK; Darrien Doherty – PR; Scott Donald – WG; John Doyle – HK	Jody Gall – SR; Noel Goldthorpe (c) – FE; Paul Green – HB; Chad Halliday – FB; Josh Hannay – CE; Brett Hetherington – PR; Brian Jellick – WG; Peter Jones – LK; Denny Lambert – HB; Martin Locke – PR; John Lomax – PR; Leigh McWilliams – HK	John Manning – SR; Glen Murphy – SR; Shane Muspratt – FE; Noa Nadruku – WG; Nick Paterson – PR; Paul Pensini – PR; Scott Prince – FE; Ben Rauter – SR; Matthew Ryan – CE; Mark Shipway – SR; Craig Smith – CE; Damien Smith – CE	Kris Tassell – FB; Shaun Valentine – SR; Kyle Warren – SR; Scott Whiting – CE; George Wilson – CE	Head coach: Tim Sheens; Assistant coach: Murray Hurst (assistant coach); Legend: (c) Captain(s); (vc) Vice-captain(s)

== Squad movement ==
=== 1999 Gains ===
Player	Signed From
Scott Asimus	Newcastle Knights
Geoff Bell	Cronulla Sharks
Greg Bourke	Sydney City Roosters
Brett Boyd	Penrith Panthers
Darrien Doherty	Adelaide Rams
Jody Gall	Penrith Panthers
Noel Goldthorpe	Adelaide Rams
Paul Green	Cronulla Sharks
Chad Halliday	Sydney City Roosters
Brett Hetherington	Canberra Raiders
Brian Jellick	Glenora Bears
Jamie McDonald	Adelaide Rams
Ben Rauter	Canberra Raiders
Matthew Ryan	Canterbury Bulldogs
Craig Smith	Wests Panthers
Damien Smith	St. Helens
Shaun Valentine	Wests Panthers
George Wilson	Redcliffe Dolphins

=== 1999 Losses ===
Player	Signed To
Michael Coorey	Cairns Cyclones
Owen Cunningham	Manly Sea Eagles
Jason Death	Auckland Warriors
Andrew Dunemann	South Sydney Rabbitohs
Jason Ferris	Cronulla Sharks
Dale Fritz	Castleford Tigers
Liam Johnson	Cairns Cyclones
Scott Mahon	Retired
John Malu	Released
Ray Mercy	Released
Ian Roberts	Retired
Luke Scott	Redcliffe Dolphins
Dale Shearer	Retired
Bert Tabuai	Released
Steve Walters	Newcastle Knights
Adam Warwick	Brisbane Broncos

== Ladder ==
1999 NRL season
Pos	Team	Pld	W	D	L	B	PF	PA	PD	Pts
1	Cronulla-Sutherland Sharks	24	18	0	6	2	586	332	+254	40
2	Parramatta Eels	24	17	0	7	2	500	294	+206	38
3	Melbourne Storm (P)	24	16	0	8	2	639	392	+247	36
4	Sydney City Roosters	24	16	0	8	2	592	377	+215	36
5	Canterbury-Bankstown Bulldogs	24	15	1	8	2	520	462	+58	35
6	St. George Illawarra Dragons	24	15	0	9	2	588	416	+172	34
7	Newcastle Knights	24	14	1	9	2	575	484	+91	33
8	Brisbane Broncos	24	13	2	9	2	510	368	+142	32
9	Canberra Raiders	24	13	1	10	2	618	439	+179	31
10	Penrith Panthers	24	11	1	12	2	492	428	+64	27
11	Auckland Warriors	24	10	0	14	2	538	498	+40	24
12	South Sydney Rabbitohs	24	10	0	14	2	349	556	-207	24
13	Manly Warringah Sea Eagles	24	9	1	14	2	454	623	-169	23
14	North Sydney Bears	24	8	0	16	2	490	642	-152	20
15	Balmain Tigers	24	8	0	16	2	345	636	-291	20
16	North Queensland Cowboys	24	4	1	19	2	398	588	-190	13
17	Western Suburbs Magpies	24	3	0	21	2	285	944	-659	10

== Fixtures ==
=== Regular season ===
Date	Round	Opponent	Venue	Score	Tries	Goals	Attendance
	Round 1	Bye					
13 March	Round 2	Penrith Panthers	Penrith Stadium	2 – 30		Bourke (1/1)	8,109
20 March	Round 3	Balmain Tigers	Leichhardt Oval	18 – 26	Nadruku (2), Halliday	Bourke (3/4)	5,969
28 March	Round 4	North Sydney Bears	Suncorp Stadium	18 – 26	Bell (3), Green	Hannay (1/3), Doyle (0/1)	3,382
3 April	Round 5	Sydney City Roosters	Dairy Farmers Stadium	10 – 34	Hannay, Nadruku	Hannay (1/3)	17,359
10 April	Round 6	Penrith Panthers	Dairy Farmers Stadium	10 – 32	Tassell	Bourke (2/2), Hannay (1/1)	8,866
18 April	Round 7	Auckland Warriors	Ericsson Stadium	24 – 0	Ryan (2), Jellick, Nadruku	Bourke (4/5)	8,954
25 April	Round 8	Brisbane Broncos	Dairy Farmers Stadium	20 – 20	Bowman, Tassell, Warren	Bourke (4/8)	30,302
1 May	Round 9	Balmain Tigers	Dairy Farmers Stadium	20 – 14	Connelly, Jellick, Shipway, Warren	Goldthorpe (2/4), Connelly (0/2)	14,752
8 May	Round 10	Manly Sea Eagles	Brookvale Oval	22 – 26	Green (2), Bowman, Doyle	Goldthorpe (2/3), Bourke (1/1), Doyle (0/1)	7,973
15 May	Round 11	Parramatta Eels	Dairy Farmers Stadium	12 – 16	Buttigieg, Connelly, Jellick	Connelly (0/1), Doyle (0/2), Goldthorpe (0/1)	17,256
	Round 12	Bye					
29 May	Round 13	South Sydney Rabbitohs	Dairy Farmers Stadium	12 – 14	Boyd, Jones	Goldthorpe (2/2)	8,751
5 June	Round 14	Cronulla Sharks	Dairy Farmers Stadium	8 – 22	Jellick, Tassell	Connelly (0/1), Goldthorpe (0/1)	16,372
13 June	Round 15	St George Illawarra Dragons	Kogarah Oval	18 – 22	Connelly, Green, Warren	Bourke (1/3), Goldthorpe (1/1), Prince (1/1)	8,156
20 June	Round 16	Newcastle Knights	Marathon Stadium	8 – 24	Ryan	Goldthorpe (2/2)	16,508
26 June	Round 17	Sydney City Roosters	SFS	32 – 18	Doyle, Jellick, Prince, D. Smith, Valentine	Goldthorpe (6/7)	4,029
3 July	Round 18	Manly Sea Eagles	Dairy Farmers Stadium	26 – 28	D. Smith, Doyle, Hetherington, Nadruku	Prince (3/5)	15,389
10 July	Round 19	Parramatta Eels	Parramatta Stadium	12 – 24	Jellick, Warren	Goldthorpe (2/3)	11,082
17 July	Round 20	Canterbury Bulldogs	Dairy Farmers Stadium	18 – 30	D. Smith (2), Nadruku	Goldthorpe (3/4)	15,080
24 July	Round 21	Canberra Raiders	Bruce Stadium	8 – 30	Warren	Goldthorpe (0/3)	9,532
31 July	Round 22	Cronulla Sharks	Shark Park	8 – 40	D. Smith	Goldthorpe (2/2)	8,921
7 August	Round 23	Melbourne Storm	Dairy Farmers Stadium	24 – 30	Jellick (2), Doyle, Halliday	Goldthorpe (4/5)	20,131
14 August	Round 24	Auckland Warriors	Dairy Farmers Stadium	14 – 40	D. Smith (2), Bell	Goldthorpe (1/3)	13,832
22 August	Round 25	Western Suburbs Magpies	Campbelltown Stadium	36 – 14	Boyd, Goldthorpe, Jones, Murphy, Prince, Shipway	Bourke (5/5), Goldthorpe (1/1)	5,588
28 August	Round 26	North Sydney Bears	Dairy Farmers Stadium	18 – 28	Jellick, Pensini, D. Smith	Bourke (3/4)	15,206
Legend: Win Loss Draw Bye

== Statistics ==
Name	App	T	G	FG	Pts
Scott Asimus	1	-	-	-	-
Geoff Bell	11	4	-	-	16
Greg Bourke	10	-	24	-	48
Paul Bowman	16	2	-	-	8
Brett Boyd	17	2	-	-	8
John Buttigieg	17	1	-	-	4
Adam Connelly	8	3	-	-	12
Paul Dezolt	4	-	-	-	-
Darrien Doherty	7	-	-	-	-
Scott Donald	1	-	-	-	-
John Doyle	19	4	-	-	16
Jody Gall	12	-	-	-	-
Noel Goldthorpe	23	1	28	-	60
Paul Green	20	4	-	-	16
Chad Halliday	12	2	-	-	8
Josh Hannay	13	1	3	-	10
Brett Hetherington	15	1	-	-	4
Brian Jellick	18	9	-	-	36
Peter Jones	22	2	-	-	8
Martin Locke	6	-	-	-	-
John Lomax	8	-	-	-	-
Leigh McWilliams	2	-	-	-	-
John Manning	4	-	-	-	-
Glen Murphy	16	1	-	-	4
Shane Muspratt	1	-	-	-	-
Noa Nadruku	17	6	-	-	24
Nick Paterson	2	-	-	-	-
Paul Pensini	6	-	-	-	-
Scott Prince	18	2	4	-	16
Ben Rauter	3	-	-	-	-
Matthew Ryan	9	3	-	-	12
Mark Shipway	19	2	-	-	8
Craig Smith	1	-	-	-	-
Damien Smith	12	9	-	-	36
Kris Tassell	12	3	-	-	12
Shaun Valentine	8	1	-	-	4
Kyle Warren	18	6	-	-	24
George Wilson	1	-	-	-	-
Totals		70	59	-	398

== Representatives ==
The following players played a representative match in 1999.

	State of Origin 2	State of Origin 3	New Zealand vs Tonga	Mediterranean Cup
Paul Green	Queensland	Queensland	-	-
Brian Jellick	-	-	New Zealand	-
Paul Pensini	-	-	-	Italy

== Honours ==
=== Club ===
- Player of the Year: Paul Bowman
- Players' Player: John Buttigieg
- Club Person of the Year: Barry Buchanan
