= Matt Bowen =

Australia international rugby league footballer

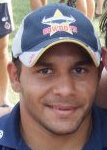
- Bowen in 2007

Personal information
- Full name: Matthew Jeremy Bowen
- Born: 9 March 1982 (age 44) Cairns, Queensland, Australia

Playing information
- Height: 172 cm (5 ft 8 in)
- Weight: 85 kg (13 st 5 lb)
- Position: Fullback
Club
Years	Team	Pld	T	G	FG	P
2001–13	North Qld Cowboys	270	130	36	5	597
2014–15	Wigan Warriors	45	24	31	0	158
	Total	315	154	67	5	755
Representative
Years	Team	Pld	T	G	FG	P
2003–07	Queensland	10	4	0	0	16
2004	Australia	1	0	0	0	0
2011–12	Indigenous All Stars	2	1	0	0	4
2010–11	Prime Minister's XIII	2	0	0	0	0
- Relatives: Brenton Bowen (cousin); Javid Bowen (nephew)

Matthew Jeremy Bowen (born 9 March 1982) is an Australian former professional rugby league footballer who played in the 2000s and 2010s. An Australia international and Queensland State of Origin representative fullback, he played in the National Rugby League (NRL) for Australian club, the North Queensland Cowboys, with whom he set the club's record for most matches, and in the Super League for English club, the Wigan Warriors. Bowen was the NRL's top try-scorer in the 2005 and 2007 seasons. Former Queensland and Australian captain Darren Lockyer has called Bowen a "little freak", citing his skills and dynamism. Two-time premiership winning coach Phil Gould remarked in 2005 that he was a "modern-day icon of the game", saying that "Bowen has unique football instincts. He performs the difficult with ease and some of his feats have redefined what we once believed to be impossible."

== Background ==
Born in Cairns, Queensland, Bowen grew up in the Cape York Aboriginal community of Hopevale. He attended St. Teresa's College, Abergowrie near Ingham where he started playing rugby league at the age of 12. His school team won the Queensland schoolboys' competition in 1999 and he was named player of the tournament. His schoolboy exploits attracted the attention of a number of NRL clubs in Sydney and Brisbane (including the Broncos, Dragons and Sharks); however, he chose to pursue his professional career with his local team, the North Queensland Cowboys. In 2000, he was part of the Cowboys' reserve grade team that made the grand final of the reserve grade competition and was selected for the Queensland under-19 team.

== Playing career ==
=== 2001 ===
Bowen made his NRL debut in Round 1 of the 2001 NRL season against Queensland rivals, the Brisbane Broncos, coming off the bench in his side's 17–18 loss at Dairy Farmers Stadium. He scored his first NRL try in Round 9 against the Canberra Raiders, coming off the bench again in a 26–34 loss.

In his rookie season, Bowen played 15 games, scoring six tries and kicking one goal. After spending time on the bench and at five-eighth, Bowen played his primary position of fullback for the final seven games of the season. At the end of the season Bowen was selected at halfback for the Junior Kangaroos, alongside future Cowboys teammates Dallas Johnson, Micheal Luck and Brent Tate.

=== 2002 ===
Despite finishing 2001 as the club's starting fullback, Bowen vacated the role at the start of the 2002 NRL season for the returning Tim Brasher, who was the Cowboys' captain at the time. Bowen played on the wing in Round 1, in a game where Brasher would once again succumb to injury, vacating the fullback spot. In Round 2, Bowen played five-eighth in the Cowboys' loss to the Broncos before taking over the fullback position permanently a week later. Bowen enjoyed a breakout season in 2002, scoring 12 tries in 24 games, including a run of five games in which he scored a try.

=== 2003 ===
In 2003, Bowen made his representative debut, being called up to the Queensland team for Game II of the State of Origin series. He played 16 minutes as a substitute, as Queensland lost the series. He was selected again for Game III of the series, coming off the bench in Queensland's 36–6 win.

Bowen played 20 NRL games in 2003, scoring nine tries, including his first NRL hat-trick in the Cowboys' 60–8 win over the South Sydney Rabbitohs in Round 24.

=== 2004 ===
The Cowboys made the finals series for the first time in 2004, with Bowen playing a key role in the side which finished one match short of their first Grand Final. In 23 games, he scored 11 tries, including one in the Cowboys first ever finals game, a 30–22 victory over the Canterbury Bulldogs. Bowen once again represented Queensland in 2004, playing in all three games and scoring his first Origin try in the Maroons' Game III loss.

At the end of the season Bowen was selected in the Australian Kangaroos squad for the Tri-Nations series. He played at fullback in a tour match against Cumbria, scoring a try, although he did not play in the Tri-Nations series, with Anthony Minichiello preferred as the Kangaroos' fullback. However, after the Tri-Nations series, he made his Test debut in a one-off match against France in Carcassonne, that Australia won 52–30. On the touring squad's return journey to Australia, he scored three tries in a non-Test exhibition match against the United States in Philadelphia.

=== 2005 ===
In 2005, halfback Johnathan Thurston joined the Cowboys, in what would prove to have a major effect on not just the club but on Bowen's career. Over the next nine seasons, Bowen and Thurston would form one of the competition's most dangerous combinations. On the back of Thurston and Bowen, the Cowboys made it to the 2005 NRL Grand Final, the club's first. Despite Bowen scoring the opening try, they lost to the Wests Tigers, 30–16. Bowen's 21 tries in 2005 made him the competition's top try scorer.

Bowen was again selected for Queensland in the 2005 State of Origin series. In Game I of the series, he proved to be the game-breaker. After coming off the bench in the second half, he intercepted a pass from New South Wales half-back Brett Kimmorley and ran 40m to score in golden point extra time, thus winning the game for Queensland. Bowen would also score tries in the second and third games of the series, although Queensland lost both matches to lose the series. He was selected in Queensland's starting line-up in the third match for the first time in his career, displacing Billy Slater.

=== 2006 ===
In 2006, Bowen and the Cowboys failed to capitalise on their progress from the previous season, finishing ninth on the ladder and missing the finals series. Bowen played Game I of the 2006 State of Origin series but was dropped from Queensland's side for Game II. He scored just five tries in 24 matches for the Cowboys, one of the lowest season tallies of his career.

=== 2007 ===
In 2007, Bowen enjoyed his most successful individual season. He regained his top try scorer's title, with 22 tries, and also made the most line breaks (32) and tackle breaks (220) in the NRL. He returned to the Queensland squad for Game III of the State of Origin series, and the Cowboys returned to the NRL finals, finishing third on the ladder. He was voted by his peers as the Rugby League Player Association's Player of the Year, was named the Cowboys' Player of the Year for the first and only time in his career, was named Rugby League Week Player of the Year and was named Fullback of the Year at the 2007 Dally M Awards. He also signed a new contract to remain at the Cowboys through the 2011 season, with his coach Graham Murray claiming he was the "best fullback in the game".

Despite the accolades for his performances during the year, Bowen was controversially omitted from the Kangaroos side to face New Zealand at the end of the season, as Brett Stewart and Kurt Gidley were preferred at fullback. Kangaroos' coach Ricky Stuart argued that Bowen's small stature was a factor against his selection. Former dual-code international Wendell Sailor argued that selectors were correct to leave Bowen out of the national team, suggesting that his form in club football had not been replicated at State of Origin level.

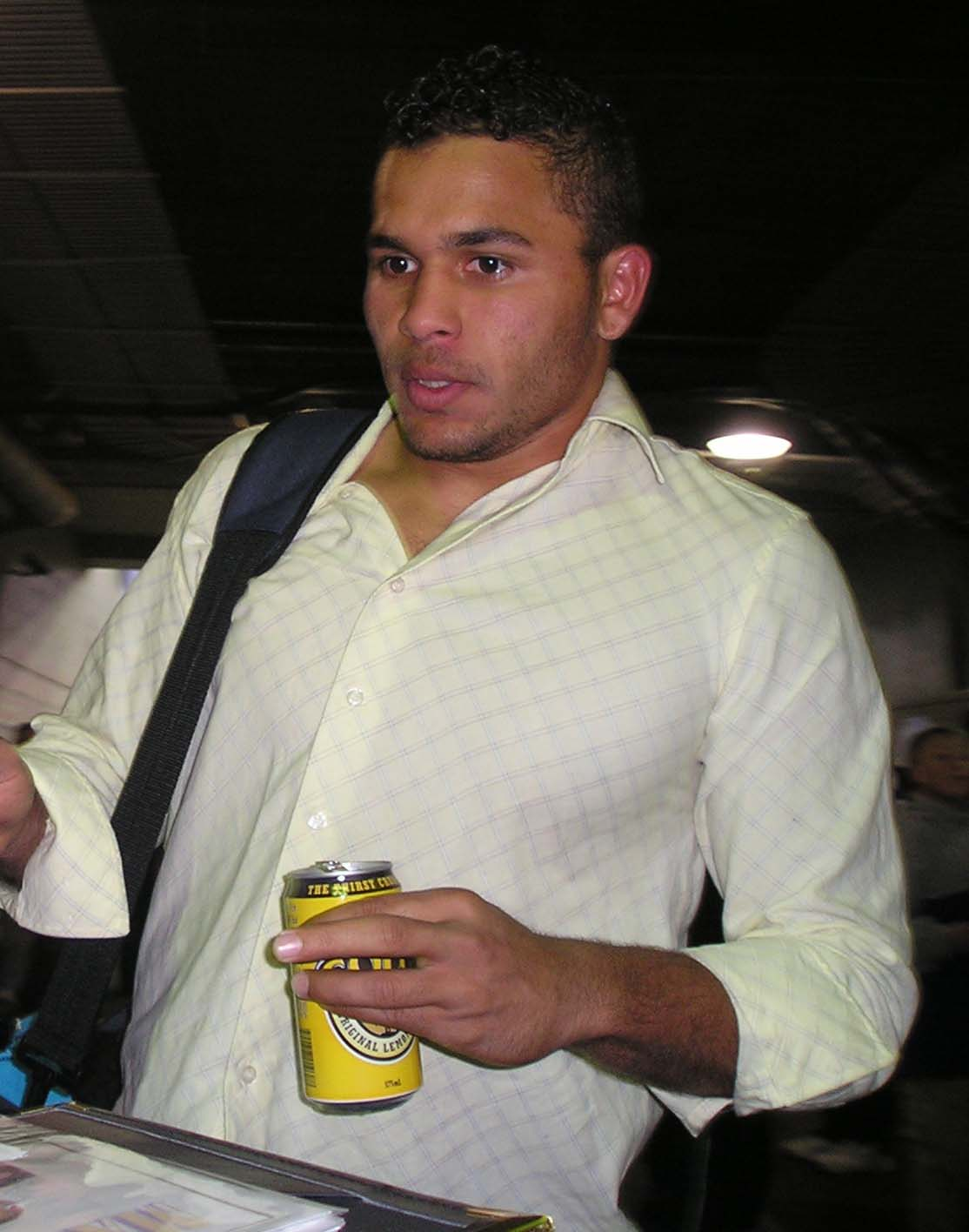
Bowen in 2008

=== 2008 ===
Bowen started the 2008 NRL season slowly, missing Rounds 4 and 5 due to a left knee injury. He returned in Round 6 against the Warriors and scored three tries. However, three weeks later, Bowen injured his knee again and underwent surgery that ruled him out of action for the rest of the season. Without him, North Queensland finished 15th on the NRL ladder.

=== 2009 ===
Bowen returned from his knee injury in the 2009 pre-season. He scored 12 tries in 20 games before he injured his right knee in August in the same way that he had injured his left knee the previous season. Another round of surgery followed, ruling him out for the remainder of the season and the beginning of the next.

=== 2010 ===
The Cowboys endured a disastrous 2010 NRL season, finishing 15th on the ladder. Bowen missed half the season due to the knee reconstruction he had in 2009, making his NRL return in the Cowboys' Round 9 win over the Sydney Roosters. Four months later, Bowen played his 200th match for the Cowboys, in their Round 26 loss to the Roosters. Bowen ended the 2010 season with a career low of two tries. Despite the poor season, Bowen was selected in the Prime Minister's XIII side that faced Papua New Guinea in Port Moresby.

=== 2011 ===
The 2011 NRL season saw Bowen return to his best form, scoring 8 tries in 25 games. He reached another milestone early in the season, surpassing former teammate Paul Bowman's record for the most NRL games by a Cowboys player. The Cowboys had an improved season, finishing seventh on the ladder and returning to the finals series. At the end of the season, Bowen was once again selected for the Prime Minister's XIII side. During the season, Bowen signed a new contract with the Cowboys through 2013, citing his "love" for the club and a desire to continue to be close to his extended family. He had considered competing offers to play in England. After the season, he was shortlisted for the Rugby League International Federation's Fullback of the Year award.

=== 2012 ===
During the 2012 NRL season Bowen surpassed the 250 game mark in the Cowboys first home elimination final since 2007, in which they defeated the Broncos 33–16. He recorded 28 try assists in 2012, more than the team's halfback Johnathan Thurston (25), and was 18th man for Queensland in Game III of the 2012 State of Origin series. At the end of the season, Bowen came second in the Dally M Medal tally with 26 points and was a finalist for Dally M Fullback of the Year. He finished 2012 with 13 tries, his most in a season since 2007.

=== 2013 ===
The 2013 NRL season would be Bowen's last with the Cowboys. On 30 August Bowen announced he would be leaving the club at the end of the season. In his final NRL season, Bowen played 19 games and scored six tries. In Round 26, Bowen played his final home game at 1300SMILES Stadium. He was chaired from the field by his teammates after his team's 50–22 victory over the Wests Tigers, in which Bowen scored two tries. He played his final NRL game a week later in the Cowboys' elimination final loss to the Cronulla Sharks at Allianz Stadium.

Bowen later said, "I was told I wasn't needed at the club at the time. You get called into the office and they say they haven't got room for you next year … I didn't know what to say …Two years later they won the comp and I would have been a part of it. It was a kick in the guts. Obviously I did so much for this club and my missus is still bitter about it today."

On 24 September, the Wigan Warriors announced the signing of Bowen for the 2014 season as a replacement for departing fullback Sam Tomkins.

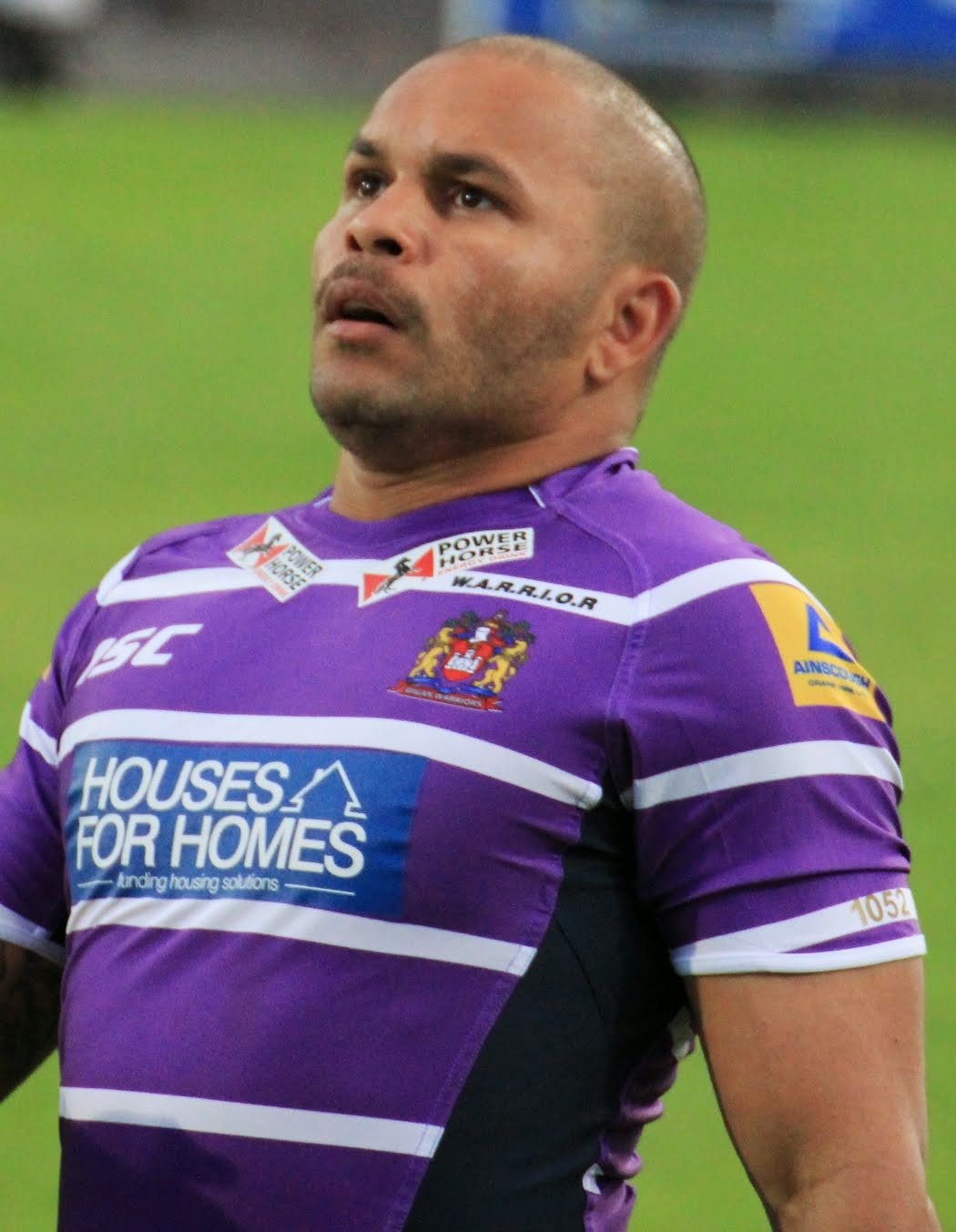
Bowen playing for Wigan Warriors in 2014

=== 2014 ===
Bowen's first match for Wigan was at home against Huddersfield in Round 1 of the 2014 Super League season, which Wigan lost 8-24. Two weeks later, Bowen returned to Australia and played in Wigan's 14-36 World Club Challenge loss to the Sydney Roosters. Despite a questionable start to his Wigan career, Bowen ended his first season in England with 15 tries from 24 games, including a hat-trick against the Hunslet Hawks in the Challenge Cup.

On 16 July, Bowen re-signed with Wigan until the end of 2015. Wigan reached the 2014 Super League Grand Final and Bowen played at fullback in their loss to St Helens at Old Trafford.

=== 2015 ===
Bowen began the 2015 Super League season as Wigan's first choice fullback. Two weeks later, Bowen faced his former club's old rivals the Brisbane Broncos for the final time, in Wigan's 12-14 World Club Series loss.

On 7 July, Wigan announced that Bowen would not be offered and new contract. Bowen took over Wigan's goalkicking duties towards the end of the season, kicking 31 goals and scoring 9 tries in his final season.

Bowen's final match was the 2015 Super League Grand Final, in which he scored a try and kicked four goals in Wigan's 20–22 loss to the Leeds Rhinos at Old Trafford, meaning that he ended his career with a third Grand Final defeat.

=== 2016 ===
Bowen participated in the 2016 NRL Auckland Nines Tournament, returning for the North Queensland Cowboys as a final farewell to the club and his playing career.

Bowen would later go on to sign with the Townsville Blackhawks in Round 11 of the Intrust Super Cup, debuting for the club in Round 12. He would receive man of the match honours in the Blackhawks 32–12 victory over the Norths Devils in Round 13, scoring a try and setting up another two.

== Achievements and accolades ==
=== Individual ===
Dally M Fullback of the Year: 2007
Rugby League Week Player of the Year: 2007
North Queensland Cowboys Player of the Year: 2007
North Queensland Cowboys Players' player of the Year: 2007
RLPA Player of the Year 2007
North Queensland Cowboys Life Member
North Queensland Cowboys 10th Anniversary team
North Queensland Cowboys 20th Anniversary team

=== Team ===
2005 NRL Grand Final: North Queensland Cowboys – Runners-up
2014 Super League Grand Final: Wigan Warriors - Runners-up
2015 Super League Grand Final: Wigan Warriors - Runners-up

== Statistics ==
=== NRL ===
Statistics are correct to the end of the 2013 season

Season	Team	Matches	T	G	GK %	F/G	Pts
2001	North Queensland	15	6	1/2	50.00%	0	26
2002	North Queensland	24	12	5/9	55.56%	0	58
2003	North Queensland	20	9	5/8	55.56%	0	46
2004	North Queensland	23	11	0	—	0	44
2005	North Queensland	25	21	0	—	0	84
2006	North Queensland	24	5	0	—	0	20
2007	North Queensland	27	22	0	—	3	91
2008	North Queensland	6	3	0	—	0	12
2009	North Queensland	20	12	0	—	0	48
2010	North Queensland	16	2	0	—	0	8
2011	North Queensland	25	8	12/19	55.56%	0	56
2012	North Queensland	26	13	12/14	85.71%	2	78
2013	North Queensland	19	6	1/2	50.00%	0	26
Career totals		270	130	36/54	66.67%	5	597

=== Super League ===
Statistics are correct to the end of the 2015 season

Season	Team	Matches	T	G	GK %	F/G	Pts
2014	Wigan	24	15	0	—	0	60
2015	Wigan	21	9	31	—	0	98
Career totals		45	24	31	—	0	158

=== State of Origin ===
†	Denotes seasons in which Bowen won a State of Origin Series

Season	Team	Matches	T	G	GK %	F/G	Pts
2003	Queensland	2	0	0	—	0	0
2004	Queensland	3	1	0	—	0	4
2005	Queensland	3	3	0	—	0	12
2006†	Queensland	1	0	0	—	0	0
2007†	Queensland	1	0	0	—	0	0
Career totals		10	4	0	—	0	16

=== Australia ===
Season	Team	Matches	T	G	GK %	F/G	Pts
2004	Australia	1	3	0	—	0	12
Career totals		1	3	0	—	0	12

== Post-playing ==
Following his retirement, Bowen returned to Australia to take up a role as a Community Engagement Officer for his former club, the North Queensland Cowboys. On 21 January, Bowen was selected as one of the NRL's Community Ambassadors for 2016. On 29 January, the Cowboys announced that Bowen would coming out of retirement to make a one-off return for the club at the 2016 NRL Auckland Nines.

== Personal life ==
Bowen was born in Cairns to Richard and Lillian Bowen and has four brothers (Wendell, Esmond, Dwayne and Stanton) and a sister (Dellece). Bowen's cousin, Brenton Bowen, played with him at the Cowboys from 2003 to 2007, before he joined the Gold Coast Titans in 2008. Bowen's nephew, Javid Bowen, is currently a member of the Cowboys' NRL squad. Another of Bowen's nephews, Rex Liddy, played for Australian Football League club, the Gold Coast Suns in 2011.

Bowen is married to Rudie Doyle, sister of former teammate John Doyle. The couple have two daughters, Diaz and Tatum, who was born the night before Bowen played in the 2015 Super League Grand Final, and one son, Matthew Jr.
