= Peter Jones (rugby league, born 1972) =

Australian rugby league footballer

Personal information
- Born: 24 July 1972 (age 54) Tully, Queensland, Australia

Playing information
- Height: 187 cm (6 ft 2 in)
- Weight: 96 kg (15 st 2 lb)
- Position: Second-row, Lock, Five-eighth
Club
Years	Team	Pld	T	G	FG	P
1995–02	North Qld Cowboys	131	13	0	0	52

Peter Jones (born 24 July 1972) is an Australian former professional rugby league footballer who played in the 1990s and 2000s. Primarily a second-rower or lock, Jones was a foundation player for the North Queensland and was the first player to make 100 appearances for the club.

== Background ==
A Tully junior, Jones joined the North Queensland Cowboys in 1994 as a five-eighth.

== Playing career ==
In Round 5 of the 1995 ARL season, Jones made his first grade debut for the Cowboys in their 12–20 loss to the Brisbane Broncos. In his rookie season, he played 12 games, scoring two tries. In 1996, he became a regular for the club, playing 19 games that year. In 1997, he played 16 games before missing the entire 1998 season due to injury.

In 1999, Jones returned to first grade, playing 22 games for the Cowboys, starting in all but one. In 2000, he played in 20 games. In Round 13 of the 2001 NRL season, Jones played his 100th game for the club, the first player to do so, in a 35–18 win over the New Zealand Warriors. Earlier that season, Jones was one of three players who testified against Wests Tigers player John Hopoate, who was found guilty of unsportsmanlike interference, in that Hopoate had inserted his finger into their anuses during the match.

At the end of 2002 season, Jones announced his retirement and at the time was the club's longest serving player.

== Achievements and accolades ==
=== Individual ===
North Queensland Cowboys Clubman of the Year: 2001

== Statistics ==
=== ARL/Super League/NRL ===
Season	Team	Matches	T	G	GK %	F/G	Pts
1995	North Queensland	12	2	0	0.0	0	8
1996	North Queensland	19	1	0	—	0	4
1997	North Queensland	16	1	0	—	0	4
1999	North Queensland	22	2	0	—	0	8
2000	North Queensland	20	3	0	—	0	12
2001	North Queensland	24	3	0	—	0	12
2002	North Queensland	18	1	0	—	0	4
Career totals		131	13	0	0.00	0	52

== Post-playing career ==
Following his retirement, Jones worked for the Cowboys. First as a recruitment manager from 2003 to 2007 and then as football operations manager from 2007 to 2012.
