= Shaun Valentine =

Australian rugby league footballer

Personal information
- Born: 13 April 1976 (age 50) Brisbane, Queensland, Australia
- Height: 185 cm (6 ft 1 in)
- Weight: 101 kg (15 st 13 lb)

Playing information
- Position: Prop, Second-row
Club
Years	Team	Pld	T	G	FG	P
1999–02	North Qld Cowboys	36	2	0	0	8
- Source: As of 10 February 2020

Shaun Valentine (born 13 April 1976) is an Australian former rugby league footballer who played for the North Queensland Cowboys in the National Rugby League. He primarily played prop or second-row.

== Playing career ==
A Brisbane Brothers junior, Valentine played for the Wests Panthers in the Queensland Cup from 1996 to 1999. In 1998, he started at centre in the Panthers' Grand Final loss to the Norths Devils. In 1999, due to a partnership between the Panthers and North Queensland Cowboys, Valentine joined the NRL club. That year he was selected to represent the Queensland Residents side.

In Round 14 of the 1999 NRL season, Valentine made his NRL debut in the Cowboys' 8–22 loss to the Cronulla Sharks at Dairy Farmers Stadium. In Round of 17 of the 1999 season, he scored his first NRL try in the Cowboys' 32–18 win over the Sydney City Roosters. Despite joining the club as a centre, Valentine transitioned into the forwards at the Cowboys, starting at second-row and eventually moving to prop.

In 2000, Valentine played 18 NRL games, the most he would play in a season. Valentine suffered a number of concussions during his career, playing just 10 games over the next seasons. He was released by the Cowboys at the end of the 2002 season and subsequently retired.

== Statistics ==
=== NRL ===
Statistics are correct to the end of the 2002 season

Season	Team	Matches	T	G	GK %	F/G	Pts
1999	North Queensland	8	1	0	—	0	4
2000	North Queensland	18	1	0	—	0	4
2001	North Queensland	7	0	0	—	0	0
2002	North Queensland	3	0	0	—	0	0
Career totals		36	2	0	—	0	8

== Post-playing career ==
In 2011, Valentine, who suffered seven concussions in an 18-month period during his career, agreed to donate his brain to the Concussion Legacy Foundation at Boston University after meeting with the foundation's co-founder Chris Nowinski.
