= Scott Prince =

Australia international rugby league footballer

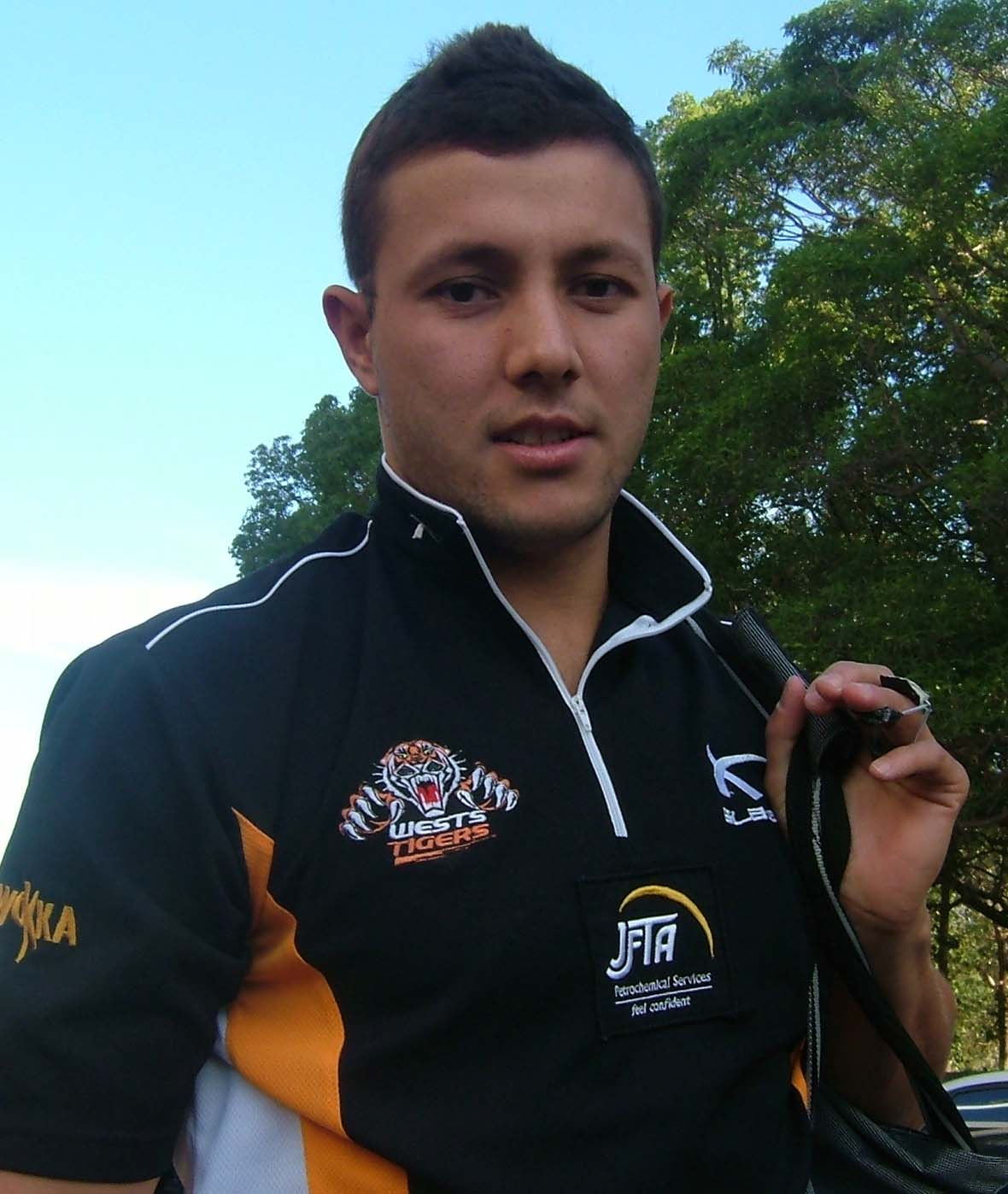

Personal information
- Born: 27 February 1980 (age 46) Mount Isa, Queensland, Australia

Playing information
- Height: 177 cm (5 ft 10 in)
- Weight: 81 kg (12 st 11 lb)
- Position: Halfback, Five-eighth
Club
Years	Team	Pld	T	G	FG	P
1998–00	North Qld Cowboys	53	9	17	0	70
2001–03	Brisbane Broncos	28	4	7	0	30
2004–06	Wests Tigers	73	18	20	3	115
2007–12	Gold Coast Titans	124	32	293	5	719
2013	Brisbane Broncos	22	4	52	0	120
	Total	300	67	389	8	1054
Representative
Years	Team	Pld	T	G	FG	P
2003	Queensland Residents	1	1	6	0	16
2004–08	Queensland	5	1	1	0	6
2005–08	Australia	4	3	14	0	40
2007–12	Prime Minister's XIII	3	0	10	0	20
2010–13	Indigenous All Stars	4	0	2	0	4

Coaching information
Club
Years	Team	Gms	W	D	L	W%
2023–	Brisbane Broncos Women	33	25	0	8	76

Scott Prince (born 27 February 1980) is an Australian former professional rugby league footballer who played as a halfback in the 1990s, 2000s and 2010s.

An Australian international and Queensland State of Origin representative, he played club football for the Wests Tigers (whom he led to the 2005 premiership, winning the Clive Churchill Medal), the Gold Coast Titans, Brisbane Broncos and the North Queensland Cowboys. Prince is currently the head coach of the Brisbane Broncos Women which won the 2025 NRLW Premiership 2025 season

== Background ==
Prince was born in Mount Isa, Queensland, Australia, and played junior rugby league for Town Lions in the Mount Isa competition. He attended high school at Ignatius Park College in Townsville where he went through the rugby league programme.

== North Queensland ==
He then began his NRL career by working his way up through the North Queensland Cowboys juniors before debuting in the top grade in the newly reunited competition's first season.

== Brisbane ==
Having won the 2000 NRL Premiership, the Broncos traveled to England to play against 2000's Super League V Champions, St Helens R.F.C. for the 2001 World Club Challenge, with Prince playing at halfback in Brisbane's loss. The Broncos were defeated by St Helens R.F.C. 18-20 after leading 12–6 at half-time. At the end of the 2002 season, Prince was named the Brisbane Broncos Clubman of the Year. Prince's playing days at the Brisbane Broncos were marred by injury that severely limited his game time. Prince broke his leg on two separate occasions, leading to him being released by the club.

== Wests Tigers ==
Prince starred at the Wests Tigers, becoming captain of the club and making his debut for Queensland and Australia during his time at the club. He was selected as the Maroons halfback for all 3 games of the 2004 State of Origin series. Prince also captained Wests Tigers to their inaugural grand final win in 2005, at the same time winning the Clive Churchill Medal for Man of the Match. That year he also became the first player from the joint venture Tigers club to earn an Australian representative debut. The following year, he played in the 2006 World Club Challenge, captaining the Tigers to 10–30 loss to the Bradford Bulls.

== Gold Coast ==
Prince returned to Queensland for the 2007 NRL season to play for the newly established Gold Coast Titans, becoming only the second player ever to play for all three Queensland teams in the top-level: Brisbane, North Queensland and Gold Coast (the first being Dale Shearer). He was named co-captain of the inaugural team with Luke Bailey.

Prince was a star for the Gold Coast before his injury which kept him out for several weeks. Prince made a return for the Titans and they finished 12th on the ladder; one win away from the Top 8.

Prince began 2008 as co-captain with Luke Bailey. It was announced that Prince would replace the injured Darren Lockyer in the second game of the 2008 State of Origin series. Prince and Johnathan Thurston complemented each other's game and led Queensland to a then-record win against the Blues (Thurston, for his part was forced to shift to five-eighth to cover for Lockyer's loss). Having replaced Darren Lockyer, Prince himself was injured early in game three of the series, breaking his left forearm, in a game Queensland won 16–10 to win a third consecutive series. In all Prince played five Origins, for three wins and two losses.

In August 2008, Prince was named in the preliminary 46-man Kangaroos squad for the 2008 Rugby League World Cup, and in October 2008 he was selected in the final 24-man Australia squad. He also played one match in the World Cup against England.

In April 2009, he was named in the preliminary 25 man squad to represent Queensland in the opening State of Origin match for 2009. Prince finished the 2009 NRL season as the fifth highest point scorer in the league, with 172 points (7 tries, 72 goals).

In 2009, Prince signed a new contract which would have kept him at the Gold Coast until 2014. However he was released from his contract at the end of the 2012 season.

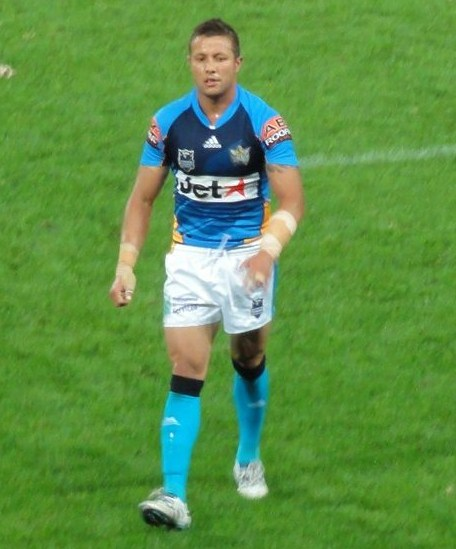
Prince playing for the Gold Coast Titans in 2010

Prince currently has many of the Gold Coast Titans' individual records, such as the person with the most points scored (603), most points in a match (20) and most points in a season (182).

== Brisbane ==
Prince rejoined the Brisbane Broncos for the 2013 NRL season. He announced his retirement from the NRL on 26 August 2013, effective at season's end.

On 5 September, Prince played his 300th and last NRL game; as well as his 50th game for the Brisbane Broncos at Suncorp Stadium. His final game was a 16–11 win over Canterbury-Bankstown, where he made a try-saving tackle in the 15th minute and had kicked 2 goals successfully (but missed one). At the end of his final game, his teammates rushed to hug him when the full-time siren sounded; sending him out as a winner.

== Post-NRL ==
In 2019, Prince coached the Queensland Under 20s team alongside Paul Dyer, losing 36–10 to the New South Wales Under 20s at ANZ Stadium. In 2020, Prince came out of retirement to play for the semi-professional Brisbane rugby league football club Fortitude Valley Diehards in the 2020 season of the Brisbane Rugby League premiership competition. He is contracted to play 10 games, plus the finals series, should the team make it that far.

In mid-November 2022, the Brisbane Broncos announced the appointment of Prince as head coach of their NRLW team for the 2023 season.

== Statistics ==
Season	Team	Pld	T	G	FG	P
1998	North Queensland Cowboys	16	1	-	-	4
1999	North Queensland Cowboys	18	2	4	-	16
2000	North Queensland Cowboys	19	6	13	-	50
2001	Brisbane Broncos	19	4	2	-	20
2002	Brisbane Broncos	2	-	5	-	10
2003	Brisbane Broncos	7	-	-	-	-
2004	Wests Tigers	21	1	-	1	5
2005	Wests Tigers	28	12	-	2	50
2006	Wests Tigers	24	5	20	-	60
2007	Gold Coast Titans	22	7	-	-	28
2008	Gold Coast Titans	16	5	51	2	124
2009	Gold Coast Titans	24	7	77	-	182
2010	Gold Coast Titans	21	4	66	3	151
2011	Gold Coast Titans	19	5	38	-	96
2012	Gold Coast Titans	22	4	61	-	138
2013	Brisbane Broncos	22	4	52	-	120
	Totals	300	67	389	8	1054

== Career highlights ==
- Junior Club: Mount Isa Townies
- High school: Ignatius Park College
- Junior Kangaroos Selection: 1998
- First Grade Debut: 1998 – Round 4, North Queensland Cowboys v Canberra Raiders at Dairy Farmers Stadium, Townsville, Queensland, 4 April.
- Premierships: 2005 – Wests Tigers defeated North Queensland Cowboys 30–16 in the Grand Final, Stadium Australia, Sydney, 2 October.
- Wests Tigers Club Captain: 2005
- Gold Coast Titans Captain: 2007-2012
- Prime Minister's XIII Debut: 2007 – Prime Minister's XIII v Papua New Guinea, Lloyd Robson Oval, Port Moresby, Papua New Guinea, 23 September.
- Prime Minister's XIII Selection: 2007-2008
- Queensland Debut: 2004 – State of Origin Game 1, Queensland v New South Wales, Stadium Australia, Sydney, 26 May.
- Queensland Selection: 2004, 2008
- Australia Test Debut: 2005 – Rugby League Tri-Nations, Australia v England, DW Stadium, Wigan, England, 5 November.
- Australia Test Squad Selection: 2005, 2008
- Indigenous All Stars Debut: 2010 – Indigenous All Stars v NRL All Stars, Skilled Park, Robina, Queensland, 13 February.
- Indigenous All Stars Selection: 2010-2012

== Honours ==
- 1998 North Queensland Cowboys Rookie of the Year
- 2002 Brisbane Broncos Clubman of the Year
- 2005 Dally M Awards Captain of the Year
- 2005 Clive Churchill Medal winner
- 2005 Provan-Summons Medal nominee
- 2007 Dally M Player of the Year nominee (equal 5th)
- 2008 RLIF Team of the Year (at Halfback)
- 2010 Dally M Awards Halfback of the Year
- 2010 RLIF Halfback of the Year
