= Naipolioni Kuricibi =

Fijian rugby league footballer

Personal information
- Born: 28 April 1978 (age 48) Votua, Nadroga-Navosa Province, Fiji
- Height: 190 cm (6 ft 3 in)
- Weight: 97 kg (15 st 4 lb)

Playing information
- Position: Wing, Centre
Club
| Years | Team | Pld | T | G | FG | P |
|---|---|---|---|---|---|---|
| 2000–01 | North Qld Cowboys | 5 | 1 | 0 | 0 | 4 |
- Source: As of 4 November 2018

Naipolioni Kuricibi (born 28 April 1978) is a Fijian former professional rugby league and rugby sevens footballer who played for the North Queensland Cowboys in the National Rugby League. He primarily played at wing and centre.

== Playing career ==
Born in Votua, in the province of Nadroga-Navosa, Kuricibi attended Ratu Kadavulevu School. He was a star track and field athlete for the school, competing in the sprint events at the 1996 and 1997 Coca-Cola Games, helping the school win the boys division in 1997. He then was selected to play for the Fiji rugby sevens side at the 1997 France Sevens, where Fiji won the Cup final.

In 1998, he switched codes, signing with the North Queensland Cowboys of the National Rugby League. In Round 16 of the 2000 NRL season, he made his NRL debut in the Cowboys' 10–18 defeat by the Newcastle Knights. He scored his first NRL try later that season, in the Cowboys' 20–36 defeat by the Sydney Roosters. Kuricibi made his final NRL appearance for the Cowboys in 2001, starting on the wing in the Cowboys' 22–24 defeat by the Northern Eagles.

He returned to Fiji and retired due a knee reconstruction and calf and ankle injuries.

== Statistics ==
=== NRL ===
Statistics are correct to the end of the 2001 season

| Season | Team | Matches | T | G | GK % | F/G | Pts |
|---|---|---|---|---|---|---|---|
| 2000 | North Queensland | 4 | 1 | 0 | — | 0 | 4 |
| 2001 | North Queensland | 1 | 0 | 0 | — | 0 | 0 |
| Career totals | | 5 | 1 | 0 | — | 0 | 4 |

== Personal life ==
Kuricibi's younger brother is former New Zealand Sevens representative Savenaca Tokula.
