= Grant Reibel =

Australian rugby league footballer (born 1980)

Personal information
- Born: 4 March 1980 (age 46) Bowen, Queensland, Australia
- Height: 182 cm (6 ft 0 in)
- Weight: 105 kg (16 st 7 lb)

Playing information
- Position: Prop
Club
Years	Team	Pld	T	G	FG	P
2000–02	North Qld Cowboys	5	0	0	0	0
- Source: As of 4 November 2018

Grant Reibel (born 4 March 1980) is an Australian former rugby league footballer who played for the North Queensland Cowboys in the National Rugby League. He primarily played at prop.

== Playing career ==
A Bowen Tigers junior, Reibel joined the North Queensland Cowboys as a teenager. In 1998, he represented the Junior Kangaroos and Queensland under-19 sides.

In Round 12 of the 2000 NRL season, he made his NRL debut in the Cowboys' 18–8 win over the Wests Tigers. After playing one more NRL game in 2000, he didn't return to first grade until the 2002 season, where he played three games. Reibel left the Cowboys at the end of the 2003 season to join the Royal Australian Air Force.

== Statistics ==
=== NRL ===
Statistics are correct to the end of the 2002 season

Season	Team	Matches	T	G	GK %	F/G	Pts
2000	North Queensland	2	0	0	—	0	0
2002	North Queensland	3	0	0	—	0	0
Career totals		5	0	0	—	0	8
