= Adam Connelly =

Australian rugby league footballer

Personal information
- Born: 28 April 1979 (age 47) Ipswich, Queensland, Australia
- Height: 183 cm (6 ft 0 in)
- Weight: 91 kg (14 st 5 lb)

Playing information
- Position: Wing
Club
Years	Team	Pld	T	G	FG	P
1999–01	North Qld Cowboys	26	7	0	0	28
- Source: As of 10 February 2020

Adam Connelly (born 28 April 1979) is an Australian former rugby league footballer who played for the North Queensland Cowboys in the National Rugby League. He primarily played wing.

== Background ==
A Norths Ipswich junior, Connelly attended Ipswich Grammar School, where he played rugby union and was selected for the Australian under-16 side before being signed by the North Queensland Cowboys.

== Playing career ==
In 1998, while contracted to the Cowboys, Connelly played for the Townsville Stingers in the Queensland Cup.

In Round 9 of the 1999 NRL season, Connelly made his NRL debut, starting on the wing and scoring a try in the Cowboys' 20–14 win over the Balmain Tigers at Dairy Farmers Stadium. He finished his debut season having played eight games, scoring three tries, and playing predominantly for the Cairns Cyclones. In 2000, he played 11 games for the Cowboys, scoring four tries, primarily playing on the wing. In 2001, his final season with the club, he played seven games. After leaving the Cowboys, Connelly switched to rugby union, playing for the ACT Griffins and trialling with the ACT Brumbies.

In 2004, Connelly played for the Ipswich Jets in the Queensland Cup before again switching to rugby union at the end of the season, where he played for the University of Queensland Rugby Club.

== Statistics ==
=== NRL ===
Statistics are correct to the end of the 2001 season

Season	Team	Matches	T	G	GK %	F/G	Pts
1999	North Queensland	8	3	0	0.00%	0	0
2000	North Queensland	11	4	0	—	0	16
2001	North Queensland	7	0	0	—	0	0
Career totals		26	7	0	0.00%	0	28
