= Jason Nicol =

Australian rugby league footballer

Personal information
- Full name: Jason Nicol
- Born: 16 June 1973 (age 53)

Playing information
- Position: Centre, Second-row
Club
| Years | Team | Pld | T | G | FG | P |
|---|---|---|---|---|---|---|
| 1993 | Penrith Panthers | 3 | 0 | 0 | 0 | 0 |
| 1996–98 | Gold Coast Chargers | 51 | 15 | 0 | 0 | 60 |
| 1999 | South Sydney | 19 | 2 | 0 | 0 | 8 |
| 2000 | North Qld Cowboys | 3 | 0 | 0 | 0 | 0 |
| 2000–02 | Salford City Reds | 60 | 11 | 0 | 0 | 44 |
| | Total | 136 | 28 | 0 | 0 | 112 |
- Source: As of 7 June 2019

Jason Nicol is an Australian former professional rugby league footballer who played in the 1990s and 2000s. He played for the Penrith Panthers, Gold Coast Chargers, South Sydney Rabbitohs and the North Queensland Cowboys in the New South Wales Rugby League (NSWRL) competition, ARL and NRL competitions. Nicol also played for the Salford City Reds in England.

== Playing career ==
Nicol made his first grade debut for Penrith in Round 12 1993 against Manly at Penrith Park. After only managing to make 3 appearances for Penrith in 3 years, Nicol departed and signed with the Gold Coast who at the time were known as the Gold Coast Seagulls.

In 1997, Nicol scored 7 tries in 20 games as the Gold Coast, now known as the Gold Coast Chargers reached their first ever finals series. Nicol played in the club's first ever finals game and finals victory, scoring a try as they defeated Illawarra 25-14 at Parramatta Stadium. The following week, Nicol scored a try in the club's qualifying final defeat against Eastern Suburbs.

Nicol played on in 1998 which would prove to be the Gold Coast's last year in the top grade. The Chargers were unable to repeat their form of 1997 and finished second last. After the liquidation of the Gold Coast, Nicol signed with South Sydney. Nicol played 19 games for the club as Souths were controversially expelled from the competition at the end of the 1999 season.

In 2000, Nicol signed with North Queensland but only made a few appearances as the club finished last on the table and claimed the wooden spoon. Nicol later joined Salford in England and played with the club up until the end of 2002 before retiring.
