= Damien Smith (rugby league) =

Australian rugby league player

Personal information
- Born: 4 July 1974 (age 50); Australia
- Height: 186 cm (6 ft 1 in)
- Weight: 98 kg (15 st 6 lb)

Playing information
- Position: Centre, Wing, Fullback
Club
| Years | Team | Pld | T | G | FG | P |
|---|---|---|---|---|---|---|
| 1995–97 | St George Dragons | 28 | 3 | 0 | 0 | 12 |
| 1998 | St Helens | 22 | 8 | 0 | 0 | 32 |
| 1999–01 | North Qld Cowboys | 30 | 12 | 0 | 0 | 48 |
| | Total | 80 | 23 | 0 | 0 | 92 |
- Source: As of 11 February 2020

Damien Smith (born 4 July 1974) is an Australian former rugby league footballer who played for the St George Dragons, St Helens and the North Queensland Cowboys. A versatile outside back, he primarily played centre.

== Background ==
A Moree Boars junior, Smith attended Ipswich Grammar School before being signed by the St George Dragons.

== Playing career ==
In Round 21 of the 1995 ARL season, Smith made his first grade debut in St George's 50–14 win over the North Queensland Cowboys. In Round 2 of the 1996 ARL season, Smith scored his first try in a 16–24 loss to the Cronulla Sharks. That season, Smith played 10 games for the Dragons in their run to the Grand Final. In 1997, Smith became a regular for the Dragons, playing 17 games, starting 12 games at fullback.

In 1998, Smith joined St Helens. He played 22 games for the club, starting 21 at centre, scoring eight tries. In 1999, Smith returned to Australia, signing for the North Queensland Cowboys. That season, he played 12 games scoring nine tries. In 2000, he started 15 games, predominantly on the wing. In 2001, his final year at the Cowboys, he played just three games.

== Statistics ==
=== ARL/NRL ===
Statistics are correct to the end of the 2001 season

| Season | Team | Matches | T | G | GK % | F/G | Pts |
|---|---|---|---|---|---|---|---|
| 1995 | St George | 1 | 0 | 0 | – | 0 | 0 |
| 1996 | St George | 10 | 2 | 0 | – | 0 | 8 |
| 1997 | St George | 17 | 1 | 0 | – | 0 | 4 |
| 1999 | North Queensland | 12 | 9 | 0 | – | 0 | 36 |
| 2000 | North Queensland | 15 | 3 | 0 | – | 0 | 12 |
| 2001 | North Queensland | 3 | 0 | 0 | – | 0 | 0 |
| Career totals | | 58 | 15 | 0 | – | 0 | 60 |

=== Super League ===
| Season | Team | Matches | T | G | GK % | F/G | Pts |
|---|---|---|---|---|---|---|---|
| 1998 | St Helens | 22 | 8 | 0 | – | 0 | 32 |
| Career totals | | 22 | 8 | 0 | – | 0 | 32 |
