= Craig Smith (1990s rugby league) =

Australian rugby league footballer

Personal information
- Born: Brisbane, Queensland, Australia

Playing information
- Position: Centre, Wing
Club
Years	Team	Pld	T	G	FG	P
1999–00	North Qld Cowboys	1	0	0	0	0
2001	Lézignan Sangliers
	Total	1	0	0	0	0
- Source: As of 9 February 2020

Craig Smith is an Australian former professional rugby league footballer who played for the North Queensland Cowboys in the National Rugby League. He primarily played centre and wing.

== Playing career ==
Smith played for the Wests Panthers in the Queensland Cup from 1996 to 2000. In 1998, he started at centre in the Panthers' 16–35 loss to the Norths Devils in the Grand Final.

In Round 26 of the 1999 NRL season, due to a partnership between Wests and the North Queensland Cowboys, Smith made his NRL debut off the bench in the Cowboys 18–28 loss to the North Sydney Bears (which was North Sydney's final first grade game).

In 2000, he returned to the Wests Panthers before joining Elite One Championship club Lézignan Sangliers in 2001. In 2015, he was named on the wing in the Wests Panthers Team of the 1990s by rugby league historian Mike Higgison.

== Statistics ==
=== NRL ===
Statistics are correct to the end of the 1999 season

Season	Team	Matches	T	G	GK %	F/G	Pts
1999	North Queensland	1	0	0	—	0	0
Career totals		1	0	0	—	0	4
