= Paul Pensini =

Italy international rugby league footballer

Personal information
- Born: 14 October 1977 (age 47); Cairns, Queensland, Australia
- Height: 190 cm (6 ft 3 in)
- Weight: 102 kg (16 st 1 lb)

Playing information
- Position: Prop
Club
| Years | Team | Pld | T | G | FG | P |
|---|---|---|---|---|---|---|
| 1998–01 | North Qld Cowboys | 17 | 1 | 0 | 0 | 4 |
Representative
| Years | Team | Pld | T | G | FG | P |
| 1999 | Italy | 1 | 0 | 0 | 0 | 0 |
- Source: As of 12 February 2020

Paul Pensini (born 14 October 1977) is a former Italy international rugby league footballer who played as a prop for the North Queensland Cowboys in the National Rugby League.

== Playing career ==
An Atherton Roosters junior, Pensini joined the North Queensland Cowboys in 1998. In Round 14 of the 1998 NRL season, he made his NRL debut in the Cowboys' 14–16 loss to the St George Dragons.

In Round 26 of the 1999 NRL season, Pensini scored his only NRL try in an 18–28 loss to the North Sydney Bears. In November 1999, Pensini was a member of Italy's Mediterranean Cup squad, playing in one game, a 14–10 win over France in Avignon.

After four seasons with the Cowboys, Pensini was released at the end of the 2001 season.

== Statistics ==
=== NRL ===
Statistics are correct to the end of the 2001 season

| Season | Team | Matches | T | G | GK % | F/G | Pts |
|---|---|---|---|---|---|---|---|
| 1998 | North Queensland | 6 | 0 | 0 | — | 0 | 0 |
| 1999 | North Queensland | 5 | 1 | 0 | — | 0 | 4 |
| 2000 | North Queensland | 4 | 0 | 0 | — | 0 | 0 |
| 2001 | North Queensland | 2 | 0 | 0 | — | 0 | 0 |
| Career totals | | 17 | 1 | 0 | — | 0 | 4 |

=== International ===
| Season | Team | Matches | T | G | GK % | F/G | Pts |
|---|---|---|---|---|---|---|---|
| 1999 | Italy | 1 | 0 | 0 | — | 0 | 0 |
| Career totals | | 1 | 0 | 0 | — | 0 | 0 |
