= Ben Rauter =

Australian rugby league footballer

Personal information
- Born: 6 January 1979 (age 47)

Playing information
- Height: 184 cm (6 ft 0 in)
- Weight: 94 kg (14 st 11 lb)
- Position: Hooker, Second-row
Club
Years	Team	Pld	T	G	FG	P
1998	Canberra Raiders	3	0	0	0	0
1999–00	North Qld Cowboys	9	0	0	0	0
2001	Wakefield Trinity Wildcats	22	3	0	0	12
	Total	34	3	0	0	12

Ben Rauter (born 6 January 1979) is an Australian former professional rugby league footballer and current assistant coach of the North Queensland Cowboys in the National Rugby League (NRL).

A hooker or second-rower, played for the Canberra Raiders, Cowboys and the Wakefield Trinity Wildcats.

== Background ==
Rauter attended Erindale College before being signed by the Canberra Raiders. In 1996, he represented the Australian Schoolboys and New South Wales under-17 team. Rauter's father, Herb, represented the Australian Schoolboys in 1972, with the pair becoming the first father-son combination to represent the side.

== Playing career ==
In Round 9 of the 1998 NRL season, Rauter made his NRL debut for the Raiders, coming off the bench in their 24–18 win over the Adelaide Rams. He played two more games for the Raiders in 1998, leaving the club at the end of the season.

In 1999, Rauter joined the North Queensland Cowboys. In Round 3 of the 1999 NRL season, he made his debut for the Cowboys, starting at second-row in a 18–26 loss to the Balmain Tigers. He played just three games for the Cowboys that season, spending the majority of the season playing for the Cairns Cyclones in the Queensland Cup.

In 2000, he played six games for the Cowboys, starting two at hooker, before leaving the club at the end of the season. In 2001, Rauter joined the Wakefield Trinity Wildcats, playing 22 games, starting 12 at hooker. After leaving Wakefield, Rauter returned to Australia, playing locally in Townsville. In 2003, he made appearances for the North Queensland Young Guns in the Queensland Cup.

== Coaching career ==
In 2013 and 2014, Rauter was an assistant coach for the Northern Pride under head coach Jason Demetriou, with the club winning the Queensland Cup premiership and NRL State Championship in 2014. From 2015 to 2018, Rauter coached the Ivanhoes Knights in the Cairns District Rugby League, winning a premiership with the club in 2016. In 2019, he coached Cairns in the Foley Shield.

On 30 October 2020, Rauter joined the North Queensland Cowboys coaching staff, acting as the club's development coach.

== Statistics ==
=== NRL ===
Season	Team	Matches	T	G	GK %	F/G	Pts
1998	Canberra	3	0	0	–	0	0
1999	North Queensland	3	0	0	–	0	0
2000	North Queensland	6	0	0	–	0	0
Career totals		12	0	0	–	0	0

== Post-playing career ==
After retiring from rugby league professionally, Ratuer became a police constable in Cairns. In 2006, he represented the Queensland Police state team.
