= John Manning (rugby league) =

Australian actor and former rugby player

Personal information
- Born: 23 February 1978 (age 47) Mackay, Queensland, Australia
- Height: 188 cm (6 ft 2 in)
- Weight: 98 kg (15 st 6 lb)

Playing information
- Position: Second-row
Club
| Years | Team | Pld | T | G | FG | P |
|---|---|---|---|---|---|---|
| 1999–01 | North Qld Cowboys | 15 | 3 | 0 | 0 | 12 |
- Source: As of 9 February 2020

John Manning (born 23 February 1978) is an Australian actor, radio presenter and former rugby league footballer who played for the North Queensland Cowboys in the National Rugby League. He primarily played second-row.

== Playing career ==
A Mackay Brothers junior, Manning joined the North Queensland Cowboys in 1996 as an 18-year old. In 1998, he played for the Cowboys' Queensland Cup feeder club, the Townsville Stingers.

In Round 23 of the 1999 NRL season, Manning made his NRL debut in the Cowboys' 24–30 loss to the Melbourne Storm. He played four games in his rookie season for the club, spending the majority of the season playing for the Cairns Cyclones in the Queensland Cup. In 2000, he scored his first NRL try in a 16–26 loss to the Brisbane Broncos. After 15 games for the Cowboys, Manning left the club at the end of the 2002 season. In 2003, he joined the Melbourne Storm but did not play NRL, spending the season playing for the Norths Devils in the Queensland Cup.

In 2019, Manning became the first head coach of the Los Angeles Mongrel.

== Statistics ==
=== NRL ===
Statistics are correct to the end of the 2001 season

| Season | Team | Matches | T | G | GK % | F/G | Pts |
|---|---|---|---|---|---|---|---|
| 1999 | North Queensland | 4 | 0 | 0 | — | 0 | 0 |
| 2000 | North Queensland | 10 | 3 | 0 | — | 0 | 12 |
| 2001 | North Queensland | 1 | 0 | 0 | — | 0 | 0 |
| Career totals | | 15 | 3 | 0 | — | 0 | 12 |

== Acting career ==
After retiring from rugby league, Manning moved to Sydney where he studied at the National Institute of Dramatic Art. He has gone on to have roles in a number of Australian television series, including Tricky Business and Home and Away, and the film Terminus.

== Radio career ==
In 2021, Manning returned to Australia and his hometown Mackay, where he began hosting the Saturday breakfast program on ABC Tropical North.

== Filmography ==
=== Film ===
| Year | Title | Role | Notes |
|---|---|---|---|
| 2011 | Venger | Lou | Short film |
| 2014 | Zoe.Misplaced | Ben | |
| 2015 | Terminus | Tony Cerillo | |
| 2015 | Colt 13 | Greg | Short film |

=== Television ===
| Year | Title | Role | Notes |
|---|---|---|---|
| 2012 | Dripping in Chocolate | Vet | Television film |
| 2012 | Tricky Business | Police Officer | Episode: "Somebody That I Used to Know" |
| 2014 | Home and Away | Geoff Campion | Episode: "Episode #1.5886" |
| 2017 | Hoges: The Paul Hogan Story | Donger | Episode: "Episode #1.1" |
| 2018 | The Bureau of Magical Things | Cedric | Episode: "A Fairy Tale" |
