= Jody Gall =

Australian rugby league footballer

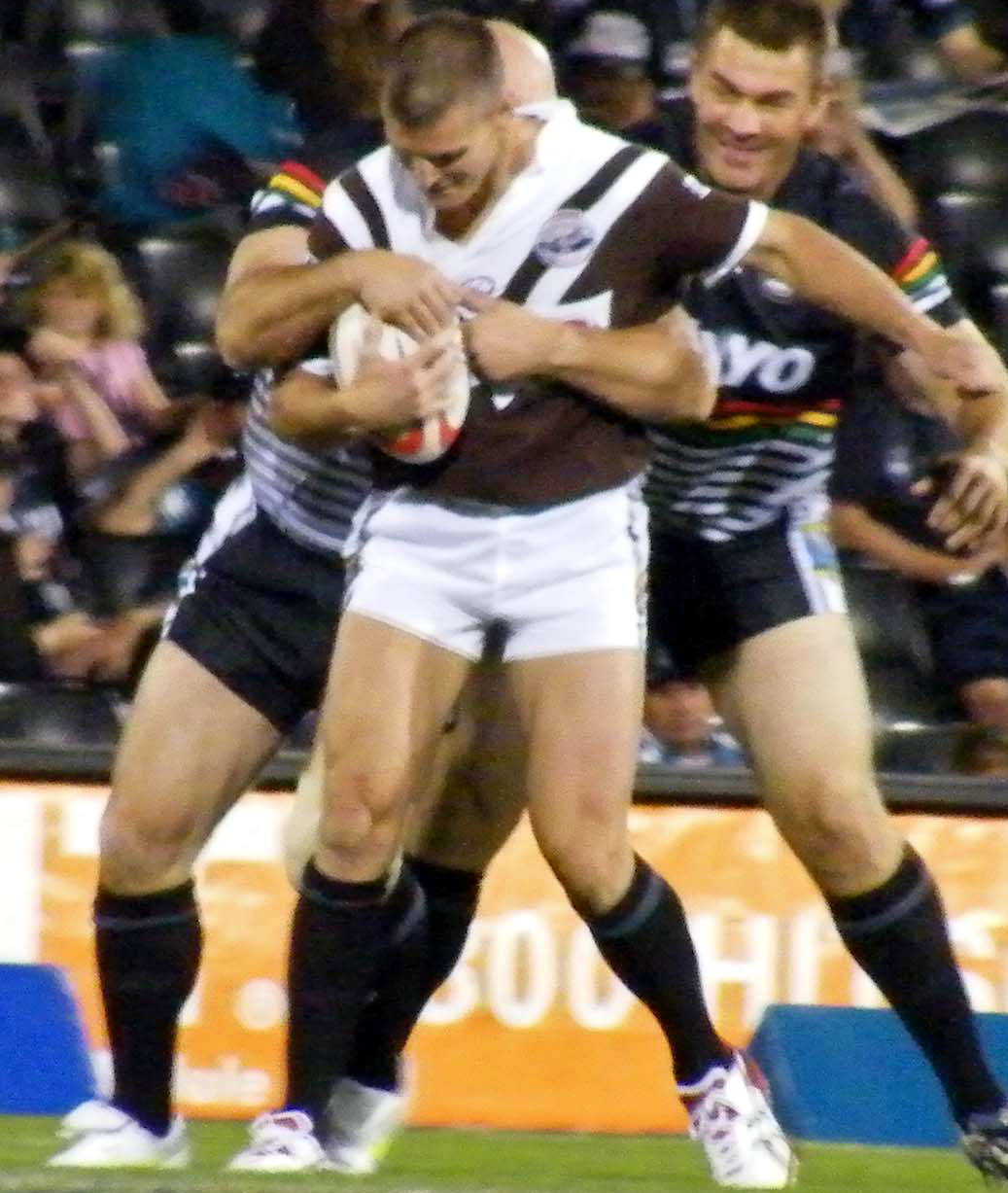

Personal information
- Full name: Jody Gall
- Born: 6 June 1974 (age 52)

Playing information
- Height: 6 ft 3 in (1.91 m)
- Weight: 15 st 2 lb (96 kg)
- Position: Prop, Second-row
Club
| Years | Team | Pld | T | G | FG | P |
|---|---|---|---|---|---|---|
| 1994–98 | Penrith Panthers | 65 | 10 | 0 | 0 | 40 |
| 1999 | North Qld Cowboys | 12 | 0 | 0 | 0 | 0 |
| 2000–02 | Penrith Panthers | 41 | 0 | 0 | 0 | 0 |
| | Total | 118 | 10 | 0 | 0 | 40 |
Representative
| Years | Team | Pld | T | G | FG | P |
| 2001 | NSW City | 1 | 0 | 0 | 0 | 0 |

Jody Gall (born 6 June 1974) is an Australian former professional rugby league footballer who played for the Penrith Panthers and the North Queensland Cowboys in the NRL. He played as a prop and second row.

Gall played for the NSW City Origin team in 2001.

== Playing career ==
Gall made his first grade debut for Penrith against the Illawarra Steelers in round 10 1994 at Penrith Park which ended in a 26-26 draw.

In 1997, Penrith joined the rival Super League competition during the Super League war. Gall played in both of Penrith's finals matches as they made it to the semi-finals before they were eliminated by Canberra.

In 1999, Gall signed with North Queensland and spent one season with the club as they finished second last on the table. In 2000, Gall rejoined Penrith. At the end of the 2000 NRL season, Penrith finished 5th on the table and qualified for the finals. Gall played in both of Penrith's finals matches which ended in defeat.

In the 2001 NRL season, Gall played 17 games for Penrith as the club endured a horror season on the field finishing last and claimed the wooden spoon.

Gall's final game in the top grade came during the 2002 NRL season against North Queensland which ended in a 28-18 loss at Penrith Park in round 7.
