= Jeremy Schloss =

Australian rugby league footballer

Personal information
- Full name: Jeremy Schloss
- Born: 18 September 1973 (age 53) unknown

Playing information
- Position: Lock, Second-row
Club
Years	Team	Pld	T	G	FG	P
1994–97	Gold Coast Seagulls	51	14	0	0	56
1998–99	South Sydney	45	2	0	0	8
2000	North Qld Cowboys	18	3	0	0	12
	Total	114	19	0	0	76
Representative
Years	Team	Pld	T	G	FG	P
1997	Queensland	3	0	0	0	0
- Source: As of 7 January 2019

Jeremy Schloss (born 18 September 1973) is a former professional rugby league footballer who played in the 1990s for the South Sydney Rabbitohs, Gold Coast Seagulls and North Queensland Cowboys. He represented Queensland in the 1997 State of Origin series. He shares in the ownership of racehorses the "Boom Brothers" alongside Andrew Dunemann.

== Playing career ==
Schloss made his debut for Gold Coast in round 22 1994 against Eastern Suburbs. Schloss spent 4 years at the club as they struggled towards the bottom of the ladder but shocked everyone in 1997 by qualifying for the finals. This was the first and only time any of the Gold Coast sides had made the finals. Gold Coast went on to win their elimination final against Illawarra but were knocked out the following week by Eastern Suburbs. Also in 1997, Schloss was selected to represent Queensland in the state of origin series against New South Wales which the blues won 2-1.

In 1998, Schloss joined South Sydney and featured heavily in his first year at the club. In 1999, he was the subject of defecation in his shoe by drunken South Sydney teammate Julian O'Neill, who infamously boasted of the incident with the alliterative line, "I just shat in Schlossy's shoe."

Towards the end of 1999, it was announced that South Sydney would be excluded from the competition after failing to meet the controversial criteria. Schloss played in Souths final game before exclusion, a 34-16 defeat against Parramatta. In 2000, Schloss joined North Queensland and made 18 appearances as the club finished last on the table claiming the wooden spoon.
