= Shane Kenward =

Australian rugby league footballer

Personal information
- Full name: Shane Robert Kenward
- Born: 7 March 1972 (age 53)

Playing information
- Position: Fullback, Centre, Five-eighth
Club
Years	Team	Pld	T	G	FG	P
1992–94	Canberra Raiders	26	14	0	0	56
1994–96	Gold Coast Chargers	26	6	0	0	24
1997	St. George Dragons	13	1	0	0	4
1998	Salford City Reds	1	0	0	0	0
1999	Wakefield Trinity Wildcats	19	7	0	0	28
2000	North Qld Cowboys	2	0	0	0	0
	Total	87	28	0	0	112

Shane Kenward (born 7 March 1972) is a former professional rugby league footballer who played in the 1990s and 2000s. He played at club level for the Canberra Raiders, Gold Coast Chargers, St. George Dragons, Salford City Reds, Wakefield Trinity Wildcats, and the North Queensland Cowboys, as a fullback, centre, five-eighth or prop.
