= Martin Locke =

Australian rugby league footballer (born 1970)

Personal information
- Born: 21 August 1970 (age 54); Queensland, Australia
- Height: 190 cm (6 ft 3 in)
- Weight: 103 kg (16 st 3 lb)

Playing information
- Position: Prop
Club
Years	Team	Pld	T	G	FG	P
1995	South Qld Crushers	17	1	0	0	4
1996–00	North Qld Cowboys	54	2	0	0	8
	Total	71	3	0	0	12
- Source: As of 13 February 2020

Martin Locke (born 21 August 1970) is an Australian former rugby league footballer who played for the South Queensland Crushers and North Queensland Cowboys in the 1990s and 2000s. He primarily played prop.

== Playing career ==
In 1989, after representing the Queensland under-19 team, Locke signed with the Brisbane Broncos. Locke spent four years with the club, playing in the under-21 and reserve grade competitions. In 1995, Locke signed with the newly formed South Queensland Crushers.

In Round 4 of the 1995 ARL season, Locke made his first grade debut in the Crushers' 0–32 loss to the Broncos' at ANZ Stadium. Locke played 17 games for the Crushers in his rookie season, scoring one try. In 1996, he joined the North Queensland Cowboys and won the club's Club Person of the Year award. Locke spent five seasons at the club, before retiring at the end of the 2000 season.

== Achievements and accolades ==
=== Individual ===
- North Queensland Cowboys Club Person of the Year: 1996, 2002

== Statistics ==
=== NRL ===
Statistics are correct to the end of the 2000 season

Season	Team	Matches	T	G	GK %	F/G	Pts
1995	South Queensland	17	1	0	—	0	4
1996	North Queensland	11	1	0	—	0	4
1997	North Queensland	11	0	0	—	0	0
1998	North Queensland	17	1	0	—	0	4
1999	North Queensland	6	0	0	—	0	0
2000	North Queensland	9	0	0	—	0	0
Career totals		71	3	0	—	0	12

== Post-playing career ==
After retiring, Locke became the Cowboys' business development manager. In 2002, he won the club's Club Person of the Year award for the second time. Since 2010, Locke has been the director of Martin Locke Homes in Townsville.
