= Scott Asimus =

Australian rugby league footballer

Personal information
- Born: 27 March 1976 (age 50) Maitland, New South Wales, Australia

Playing information
Club
| Years | Team | Pld | T | G | FG | P |
|---|---|---|---|---|---|---|
| 1999 | North Qld Cowboys | 1 | 0 | 0 | 0 | 0 |
| 2000–01 | Northern Eagles | 6 | 0 | 0 | 0 | 0 |
| | Total | 7 | 0 | 0 | 0 | 0 |

Scott Asimus (born 27 March 1976) is an Australian former professional rugby league footballer who played for the North Queensland Cowboys and Northern Eagles in the NRL.

A prop from Maitland, Asimus started out at the Newcastle Knights, where he played in the lower grades.

Asimus played three seasons of first-grade, at North Queensland in 1999, then the Northern Eagles in 2000 and 2001.

Since leaving the NRL, Asimus has worked as a teacher in the Hunter Region.

== See also ==
- List of North Queensland Cowboys players
- List of Northern Eagles players
- Rugby league in New South Wales
