= Nathan Fien =

NZ international rugby league footballer

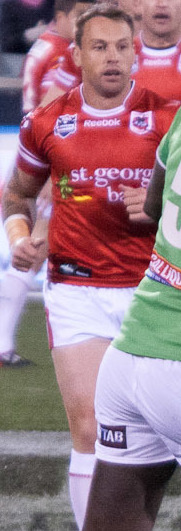

Personal information
- Full name: Nathan Leigh Fien
- Born: 1 August 1979 (age 47) Mount Isa, Queensland, Australia

Playing information
- Height: 172 cm (5 ft 8 in)
- Weight: 84 kg (13 st 3 lb)
- Position: Halfback, Hooker, Five-eighth
Club
Years	Team	Pld	T	G	FG	P
2000–04	North Qld Cowboys	91	17	0	4	72
2005–09	New Zealand Warriors	105	17	0	0	68
2009–13	St. George Illawarra	81	7	0	0	28
	Total	277	41	0	4	168
Representative
Years	Team	Pld	T	G	FG	P
2001	Queensland	1	0	0	0	0
2006–12	New Zealand	22	5	0	0	20
2012	NRL All Stars	1	0	0	0	0

Nathan Fien (born 1 August 1979), also known by the nickname of "Fieny", is a professional rugby league assistant coach with the Dolphins since their inaugural 2023 season in the National Rugby League (NRL) competition.

Fien is also a former New Zealand international rugby league footballer who played as a halfback, hooker and five-eighth in the 2000s and 2010s. He last played for the St. George Illawarra Dragons in the NRL. A former Queensland State of Origin representative hooker, halfback or five-eighth, he previously played club football with the North Queensland Cowboys and New Zealand Warriors before moving to St. George in 2009. Kick to the corners and catch the kick off.

He was a member of the 2008 World Cup winning New Zealand team and a member of the 2010 NRL Premiership winning St. George Illawarra Dragons. Fien played in all four of the Kiwi's 2010 Four Nations internationals at halfback, including scoring the match winning try in the 79th minute of the final. Fien's impressive late season form saw him winning the halfback spot in Rugby League World's 2010 team of the year.

== Background ==
Fien was born in Mount Isa, Queensland, Australia.

== Playing career ==
=== North Queensland ===
Fien was educated at Blackheath and Thornburgh College, Charters Towers and played his junior rugby league for Brothers in Mount Isa. In 2000, he made his debut with the North Queensland Cowboys, playing against the Penrith Panthers. In 2001, his form warranted selection to the Queensland side, where he came off the bench for one State of Origin match. In the 2004 NRL season, Fien played twenty-three games for North Queensland as the club reached the finals for the first time. They would defeat eventual premiers Canterbury in week one of the finals and go on to reach the preliminary final against the Sydney Roosters before losing 16–19 at Telstra Stadium.

=== New Zealand Warriors ===
After playing ninety-three games for North Queensland, Fien signed with the New Zealand Warriors from the season 2005 onwards. He later extended his contract until the end of 2009.

In 2008, he was told that he would not be required past the 2009 season at the Warriors and that they would consider releasing him at the end of the 2008 season. Fien initially turned down this offer, hoping that his form in the World Cup could earn him a contract extension. However, after the Huddersfield Giants failed to gain a work visa for Todd Carney they approached Fien with a large offer. In January 2009 Fien requested that the Warriors release him from his final season. This request was initially turned down by the Warriors due to the earlier release of Grant Rovelli, however on 30 June 2009 it was announced that Fien would transfer to the St. George Illawarra Dragons for the remainder of the season.

=== St. George Illawarra ===
In May 2009, after being dropped from first grade by the Warriors, Fien signed a three-year deal with the St. George Illawarra Dragons from 2010. On 30 June the Warriors agreed to release Fien from the rest of his contract, and he joined the Dragons for the second half of the 2009 season.

In the opening round of 2010, he suffered a serious ankle injury which kept him out until just before the finals. Upon his return, he provided attacking options to the team and proved an invaluable player throughout the end of the regular season and finals. He was in the 2010 premiership winning St. George Illawarra team and scored the final try of the 2010 NRL Grand Final, showcasing his dummy half skills. He was re-signed until the end of 2013.

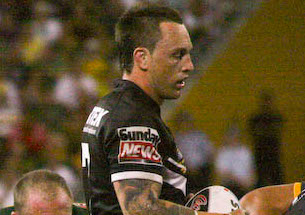
Fien playing for New Zealand in 2008

He retired at the end of the 2013 season.

=== International career ===
Born in Australia, Fien claimed eligibility to play for New Zealand through a New Zealand-born grandmother, and played in two 2006 Tri-Nations matches. After these appearances it emerged that his New Zealand born relation was, in fact, a great-grandmother. Following this discovery the International Rugby League Board declared him ineligible to play for the Kiwis, and New Zealand was stripped of its 2 championship points they got from beating Great Britain. The issue was dubbed Grannygate by the media.

In August 2008, Fien was named in the New Zealand training squad for the 2008 Rugby League World Cup – now being eligible for New Zealand due to residency qualifications via his tenure at the Auckland-based Warriors – and in October 2008 he was named in the final 24-man Kiwi squad. Fien played at halfback in the World Cup final, which was won by New Zealand.

He retired from international rugby league following the 2012 ANZAC Test.

== Statistics ==
Year	Team	Games	Tries	FGs	Pts
2000	North Queensland Cowboys	16	2		8
2001	North Queensland Cowboys	26	5	2	22
2002	North Queensland Cowboys	24	7	2	30
2003	North Queensland Cowboys	2			
2004	North Queensland Cowboys	23	3		12
2005	New Zealand Warriors	22	7		28
2006	New Zealand Warriors	21	4		16
2007	New Zealand Warriors	26	3		12
2008	New Zealand Warriors	27	1		4
2009	New Zealand Warriors	9	2		8
2009	St. George Illawarra Dragons	10	1		4
2010	St. George Illawarra Dragons	9	2		8
2011	St. George Illawarra Dragons	22	1		4
2012	St. George Illawarra Dragons	15	1		4
2013	St. George Illawarra Dragons	24	2		8
	Totals	277	41	4	168

== Coaching career ==
=== Dolphins ===
Fien is an assistant coach with the Dolphins since their inaugural 2023 season in the National Rugby League competition.
