= Chad Halliday =

Australian rugby league footballer

Personal information
- Full name: Chad Owen Halliday
- Born: 4 April 1977 (age 49) Sydney, New South Wales, Australia

Playing information
- Position: Fullback, Centre, Wing
Club
Years	Team	Pld	T	G	FG	P
1997	Sydney City Roosters	1	1	0	0	4
1999–00	North Qld Cowboys	16	2	0	0	8
2002	Penrith Panthers	11	0	0	0	0
	Total	28	3	0	0	12
- Source: As of 13 March 2019

Chad Halliday is an Australian former professional rugby league footballer who played in the 1990s and 2000s.

== Playing career ==
Halliday made his first grade debut for Eastern Suburbs known now as the Sydney Roosters in Round 22 1997 against the North Sydney Bears scoring a try in a 29-20 victory at the Sydney Football Stadium.

In 1999, Halliday joined North Queensland and scored a try on debut for his new club against the Balmain Tigers in Round 3 1999. Halliday spent 2 years at North Queensland finishing with a wooden spoon in 2000 as the club finished last on the table.

In 2001, Halliday joined Parramatta but made no appearances for the club at NRL level and spent the entire season playing for the NSW Cup side.

In 2002, Halliday joined Penrith and played a total of 11 games for them. Halliday's final game in first grade was a 68-28 victory over the Northern Eagles in Round 26 2002.

== Post playing ==
After retiring from rugby league, Halliday became a senior constable in the NSW Police force. In 2014, Halliday was charged with assault occasioning actual bodily harm in relation to a high speed chase which ended in Halliday kicking one of the assailants who was a teenager in the face breaking his nose.

On April 15 2015, Halliday was cleared of assault as the magistrate dismissed the charges stating that Halliday's action was lawful.
