= Darrien Doherty =

Australian rugby league footballer

Personal information
- Born: 12 November 1971 (age 53); New South Wales, Australia

Playing information
- Position: Prop, Second-row
Club
Years	Team	Pld	T	G	FG	P
1990	Penrith Panthers	1	0	0	0	0
1993–94	Western Suburbs	4	1	0	0	4
1995	Sydney Bulldogs	4	0	0	0	0
1996	Illawarra Steelers	20	1	0	0	4
1997	Hunter Mariners	11	1	0	0	4
1998	Adelaide Rams	19	0	0	0	0
1999–00	North Qld Cowboys	8	0	0	0	0
	Total	67	3	0	0	12

Darrien Doherty (born 12 November 1971) is an Australian former rugby league footballer who played in the 1990s. He is one of three players to date (the others being Tyran Smith and Blake Green) to play first grade for a record seven different NRL clubs.

== Career ==
Doherty began his playing career at the age of 18 with his one and only first grade game with the Penrith Panthers on 26 August 1990, coming off the bench and playing the Second-row in their round 22 clash against the Western Suburbs Magpies at Campbelltown Stadium.

Doherty didn't play again in first grade until 1993 when he joined Wests. Staying at the club for two seasons, Doherty played a total four games and scored his first top grade points with a try in the club's 38-4 win over the Gold Coast Seagulls in round 14 of the 1994 season.

In 1995, Doherty joined the Sydney Bulldogs and started the season in first grade against North Queensland as a replacement forward. Doherty then became a regular member of the reserve grade team.

In 1996, Doherty joined the Illawarra Steelers and cemented a first-grade spot for a whole season for the very first time, playing 20 games that season.

In 1997, Doherty signed with Super League and joined the Hunter Mariners and played 11 games that season. In 1998, with the Super League war ended and the Hunter Mariners folding, he joined the Adelaide Rams, going on to play 19 games that season.

Adelaide then folded at the end of 1998 season, leading Doherty to join North Queensland Cowboys, playing eight games from 1999 to 2000.
