= Robert Relf (rugby league) =

Australian rugby league footballer

Personal information
- Full name: Robert Relf
- Born: 29 January 1971 (age 55) Gloucester, New South Wales, Australia

Playing information
- Position: Second-row, Hooker
Club
Years	Team	Pld	T	G	FG	P
1992–99	Canterbury Bulldogs	126	10	0	0	40
2000–01	North Qld Cowboys	45	8	0	0	32
2002–04	Widnes Vikings	76	5	0	0	20
	Total	247	23	0	0	92
- Source: As of 23 October 2019

Robert Relf (born 29 January 1971) is an Australian former professional rugby league footballer who played in the 1990s and 2000s.

== Background ==
Relf grew up in a small town called Gloucester, New South Wales, Australia.

== Playing career ==
Relf played local football in the Gloucester area and then was offered a contract to play for Canterbury-Bankstown. In 1994, Relf played 10 matches for the club but was not included in the grand final losing side against Canberra.

In 1995, Relf played 24 games for the club but missed out on playing in the club's 1995 grand final victory over Manly due to injury. Relf played at second-row forward for the Canterbury-Bankstown Bulldogs in their loss at the 1998 NRL grand final to the Brisbane Broncos.

In total, Relf made 126 appearances overall for Canterbury and his last game for the club was a 24-22 loss against Melbourne in the 1999 finals series.

Relf joined North Queensland at the end of the 1999 season and played 2 years for the club as they finished last in 2000 and second last in 2001. In 2002, Relf signed to play for the Widnes Vikings. Relf played 3 seasons for Widnes and retired at the end of 2004.
