= Brett Boyd =

Australian rugby league footballer

Personal information
- Born: 28 March 1972 (age 53)

Playing information
- Position: Hooker
Club
Years	Team	Pld	T	G	FG	P
1991	Canberra Raiders	13	1	0	0	4
1992–98	Penrith Panthers	93	10	0	0	40
1999–00	North Qld Cowboys	27	3	0	0	12
	Total	133	14	0	0	56

Brett Boyd (born 28 March 1972) is an Australian former professional rugby league footballer who played for Canberra, Penrith and North Queensland.

== Biography ==
Boyd, a hooker, played his junior football in Goulburn and was a member of Canberra's under 21s premiership in 1990.

In his first season in 1991 he appeared in 13 first-grade games for Canberra, including three finals. He featured in Canberra's preliminary final win over North Sydney, but wasn't used in the grand final loss to Penrith, the club he went on to join in the 1992 season.

Having been an understudy to Steve Walters at Canberra, he was the first choice hooker at Penrith, playing 93 first-grade games in seven seasons.

In 1999 and 2000 he played at North Queensland, under his former Canberra coach Tim Sheens.
