= Greg Bourke =

Australian rugby league footballer

Personal information
- Full name: Gregory Bourke
- Born: 5 September 1973 (age 51); Sydney, New South Wales, Australia

Playing information
- Position: Centre, Wing
Club
Years	Team	Pld	T	G	FG	P
1994–96	Balmain Tigers	22	7	29	0	86
1997	Sydney City Roosters	5	2	0	0	8
1999–00	North Qld Cowboys	13	0	24	0	48
	Total	40	9	53	0	142
- Source: As of 30 May 2019

Greg Bourke is an Australian former professional rugby league footballer who played in the 1990s and 2000s. He played for the Balmain Tigers, Eastern Suburbs and the North Queensland Cowboys in the Australian Rugby League and NRL competitions.

== Playing career ==
Bourke made his first grade debut for Balmain in Round 1 1994 against North Sydney at Leichhardt Oval, kicking 3 goals in a 33–22 loss. Balmain would go on to finish last in 1994 and claimed only their fourth wooden spoon since entering the competition in 1908. In 1995 at the start of the Super League war, Balmain cut several players and moved their home games to Parramatta Stadium. The club also changed their name to the "Sydney Tigers".

The change in venue and name did not improve the club's fortunes and they missed out on the finals in 1995 and 1996. Bourke then moved to the Sydney City Roosters for the 1997 season who had only recently changed their name from Eastern Suburbs. Bourke found opportunities limited at the club and he only played 5 games for them over 2 seasons.

In 1999, Bourke joined North Queensland. North Queensland finished the 1999 season in second last position on the table. In 2000, Bourke only made 3 appearances for the club and was released at the end of the season as North Queensland finished last and claimed the wooden spoon.

Bourke then went to play in the Queensland Cup competitions and in 2004 was playing with Wynnum-Manly.
