= Julian O'Neill =

Australia international rugby league footballer

Personal information
- Full name: Brian Julian O'Neill
- Born: 14 October 1972 (age 54) Hornsby, New South Wales, Australia

Playing information
- Height: 180 cm (5 ft 11 in)
- Weight: 92 kg (14 st 7 lb)
- Position: Fullback, Five-eighth, Centre
Club
Years	Team	Pld	T	G	FG	P
1991–95	Brisbane Broncos	105	33	202	10	480
1992–93	Widnes	12	3	3	0	18
1995–96	London Broncos	3	0	13	1	27
1996–97	Western Reds	26	12	63	4	178
1997–99	South Sydney	54	9	101	0	238
2000–01	North Qld Cowboys	47	14	122	0	300
2002–03	Wigan Warriors	30	12	72	0	192
2003–05	Widnes Vikings	60	13	157	7	338
2005	Wakefield Trinity Wildcats	12	2	4	0	16
2006	Leigh Centurions	12	1	58	2	122
	Total	361	99	795	24	1909
Representative
Years	Team	Pld	T	G	FG	P
1993–00	Queensland	10	2	9	0	26
1997	Queensland (SL)	1	0	0	0	0
1997	Australia (SL)	1	0	0	0	0
- Relatives: Ethan O'Neill (son)

Brian Julian O'Neill (born 14 October 1972) is an Australian former professional rugby league footballer who played in the 1990s and 2000s. Primarily a goal-kicking fullback or five-eighth, during his 14-year top-grade career he played with several clubs in both Australia and England, which included two NSWRL premierships, a Challenge Cup victory as well as state and national representative honours. However O'Neill also regularly made headlines for his involvement in numerous controversial off-field incidents.

== Early life ==
O'Neill was born in Hornsby, New South Wales on 14 October 1972. His mother, Patricia O'Neill, a nursing sister, was killed in a car crash when he was seven. His father, Brian Allan O'Neill, a gynaecologist, died of heart disease when Julian was eight.

O'Neill was raised by his grandparents and other family members from time to time. From age ten he attended boarding school at St Brendan's College in Yeppoon, Queensland. He was a prodigious young sportsman, holding school records in athletics and swimming. He also represented as an Australian Schoolboy in rugby league, cricket and tennis.

He is the father of professional rugby league footballer Ethan O'Neill.

== Playing career ==
O'Neill was signed to a sporting scholarship with the Brisbane Broncos at age fifteen and was selected for the Australian Schoolboys side in 1989 and 1990. However, he was ruled ineligible to play for this representative side in 1990 due to having already been a non-playing bench player for the Brisbane Broncos in a match against St George while O’Neill was still in Year 12.

=== 1990s ===
O'Neill was graded by the Broncos in 1990. He showed greater form at fullback and played there in Brisbane's inaugural Grand Final victory in 1992. In the weeks following the grand final O'Neill travelled with the Broncos to England, where he played at fullback in the 1992 World Club Challenge against British champions Wigan, helping Brisbane become the first NSWRL club to win the match in Britain.

O'Neill is only 19 and he will play for Queensland and Australia. When I saw him play schoolboy football, I said to my president, Barry Nelson, 'We'll go big for this kid'. You normally give schoolboys $5,000. We offered him $40,000, and he still signed with the Broncos.

— Canterbury-Bankstown CEO Peter "Bullfrog" Moore following the 1992 Winfield Cup Grand Final

O'Neill briefly signed for English club Widnes, who were then coached by Phil Larder and he appeared as a substitute in the 1993 Challenge Cup Final at Wembley Stadium, only to suffer a 20–14 defeat by Wigan. O'Neill first represented Queensland, coming off the interchange bench, in Game II of the 1993 State of Origin series. He played at five-eighth in Game III. The Broncos reached the 1993 Winfield Cup Grand Final and O'Neill played at fullback as they again beat St. George for a second consecutive premiership title.

O'Neill then played at fullback in all three games of the 1994 State of Origin series under coach Wally Lewis. During the 1994 NSWRL season, O'Neill played at lock forward for defending premiers Brisbane when they hosted British champions Wigan for the 1994 World Club Challenge, but were defeated by the British club on this occasion. In 1994 and 1995, O'Neill was the Brisbane Broncos' top point-scorer. As his fame and confidence grew at the Broncos, O'Neill found himself at the centre of a number of alcohol-fuelled incidents. At Southport Magistrates Court in 1995 he faced five charges, following an incident at Conrad Jupiters Casino where he was reported to have urinated under a blackjack table, including indecent exposure and offensive behavior. He was found not guilty, three fraud charges were dropped and he was awarded costs.

After being released by the Brisbane Broncos, O'Neill signed with the London Broncos but was released after just three games following a drink-driving incident.

O'Neill returned to Australia with the Western Reds in 1996 ARL season. Whilst playing for them he was selected to play for Queensland at five-eighth in Game II of the 1996 State of Origin series. He was playing for the Super League-aligned Western Reds during the 1997 split competition and made one state and one national representative appearance for the Super League representative teams: O'Neill was selected to play for Australia from the interchange bench in the inaugural Anzac Test and at fullback for Queensland in Game 1 of the Super League Tri-series. O'Neill set club records for most tries and goals in a match but was released by the Reds 9 rounds into 1997 after multiple off-field incidents including phoning teammates and asking for money during a late night gambling session.

O'Neill then switched to play in the 1997 ARL season with the South Sydney Rabbitohs. He gained selection for Queensland, playing from the interchange bench in Game II of the 1997 State of Origin series making him the only player in history to appear in both the Tri-Series and State of Origin in the same season. In 1998, however he suffered immense publicity and a $10,000 fine from the club over a 1999 pre-season tour incident where a drunken O'Neill defecated in the footwear of teammate Jeremy Schloss. This incident became known as "the poo in the shoe" affair, and gained much media attention and public ridicule after O'Neill reportedly uttered the alliterative line, "I just shat in Schlossy's shoe," to his teammates. For a time he was engaged to Australian swimming star Samantha Riley, but the engagement ended. Riley was renowned for having a clean-living reputation despite being embroiled in a drugs controversy herself in the lead-up to the 1996 Atlanta Olympics.

=== 2000s ===
O'Neill was signed to play the 2000 NRL season for the North Queensland Cowboys and was selected to play at five-eighth in Game II of the 2000 State of Origin series. He was then named the Cowboys' player of the year. He made a total of ten career State of Origin appearances.

In 2001, O'Neill's 13-month-old daughter, Piper, was killed when a television set fell onto her in his family's home. O'Neill returned to England the 2002 Super League season for the Wigan Warriors, enjoying victory in the Challenge Cup, until 2003 when he completed a mid-season move to the Widnes Vikings. In 2004, while on a pre-season trip to Australia with the Widnes Vikings, he was accused of drunkenly attempting to set fire to a 13-year-old boy who was wearing a foam-rubber dolphin mascot suit whilst on a river cruise in Port Macquarie. To avoid apprehension, O'Neill stripped to his underwear following the incident, dived into the Hastings River and swam to shore, before hitchhiking and being picked up by a passing car. In 2004, he had a season playing rugby union in France.

O'Neill returned to rugby league in England in 2005 and played half the season with the Wakefield Trinity Wildcats, then switching back to former club the Widnes Vikings until their relegation from the Super League that year. He then moved to also relegated Leigh Centurions for the 2006 season. In 2015, O'Neill was involved in an ugly facebook saga with former player Jack Elsegood. O'Neill had posted a comment congratulating his son Ethan on making the Queensland Under 16 team, Elsegood then forwarded the message onto O'Neill's ex-wife. O'Neill then took to facebook and messaged Elsegood saying "Cheers to Jack Elsegood for sending my Facebook status to my ex wife – your [sic] a dog. Game over".
