= Brett Hetherington =

Australian rugby league footballer

Personal information
- Full name: Brett Hetherington
- Born: 9 February 1971 (age 54)

Playing information
- Position: Prop, Second-row
Club
Years	Team	Pld	T	G	FG	P
1992–98	Canberra Raiders	119	4	0	0	16
1999–01	North Qld Cowboys	23	1	0	0	4
	Total	142	5	0	0	20

Brett Hetherington is an Australian former professional rugby league footballer who played for the Canberra Raiders and North Queensland Cowboys.

== Playing career ==
Hetherington made his debut for Canberra in Round 1 of the 1992 season against Penrith. In 1994, Hetherington played 24 matches for the club including the 1994 36-12 grand final victory over Canterbury-Bankstown. As of 2019, this has been Canberra's last premiership win.

Hetherington played 16 matches the following season as Canberra reached the preliminary final but fell short of another grand final appearance losing to Canterbury 25-6. Hetherington remained loyal to Canberra during the super league war and played with the club in 1997 when they joined the super league competition for its first and only season. Canberra reached the preliminary final that year before losing to Cronulla. It would be 19 years before Canberra would reach another preliminary final.

In 1999, Hetherington joined North Queensland and played 3 seasons at the club with North Queensland finishing last in 2000. Hetherington's final match in first grade was a 29-10 loss against his former club Canberra.

At representative level, Hetherington represented Australia at the 1997 Super League World Nines.
