= Nick Paterson =

Australian rugby league footballer and coach

Personal information
- Born: 24 September 1979 (age 47) Toowoomba, Queensland, Australia

Playing information
- Position: Prop
Club
Years	Team	Pld	T	G	FG	P
1999–01	North Qld Cowboys	15	1	0	0	4
2002–03	Cronulla Sharks	3	0	0	0	0
2004	Manly Sea Eagles	1	0	0	0	0
	Total	19	1	0	0	4

Nick Paterson (born 24 September 1979) is an Australian former professional rugby league footballer who played for North Queensland, Cronulla and Manly-Warringah in the NRL.

== Playing career ==
A prop from Toowoomba, Paterson started his NRL career at North Queensland, where he played a total of 15 first-grade games in three seasons. Most of his appearances came in the 2001 NRL season, featuring in 12 rounds. From 2002 to 2003, Paterson played under Chris Anderson at Cronulla, then switched to Manly-Warringah in 2004, but was unable to get regular games at either club.

Since leaving the NRL, Paterson played locally in Queensland before retiring in 2008 to pursue a coaching career. Paterson, a Queensland Police officer outside of football, coached the Caloundra Sharks to an A-Grade premiership in 2009 and has been an assistant coach with Sunshine Coast.
