= Geoff Bell (rugby league) =

Scotland international rugby league footballer

Personal information
- Full name: Geoffrey Bell
- Born: 1 June 1973 (age 53)

Playing information
- Position: Centre, Wing
Club
Years	Team	Pld	T	G	FG	P
1994–98	Cronulla Sharks	78	24	0	0	96
1999–01	North Qld Cowboys	33	9	0	0	36
2002–03	Penrith Panthers	13	5	0	0	20
	Total	124	38	0	0	152
Representative
Years	Team	Pld	T	G	FG	P
1997	Queensland (SL)	1	0	0	0	0
2000	Scotland	3	1	0	0	4

Geoff Bell (born 1973) is a former Scotland international rugby league footballer who played as a centre or winger in the 1990s and 2000s. A Scotland international and Queensland interstate representative, he played club football for the Cronulla-Sutherland Sharks, North Queensland Cowboys and the Penrith Panthers.

== Playing career ==
Bell was selected to play for the Queensland rugby league team in the 1997 Super League Tri-series. He also played on the wing in the Cronulla-Sutherland Sharks' loss at the 1997 Super League Grand Final to the Brisbane Broncos.

Bell was selected to travel to Europe and play for the Scotland national rugby league team at the 2000 World Cup. In 2002, Bell changed clubs but stayed in Sydney when he moved from the Cronulla-Sutherland Sharks to the Penrith Panthers.
