= John Doyle (rugby league) =

Australian rugby league footballer

Personal information
- Born: 31 July 1977 (age 47); Rockhampton, Queensland, Australia

Playing information
- Height: 184 cm (6 ft 0 in)
- Weight: 95 kg (14 st 13 lb)
- Position: Hooker
Club
| Years | Team | Pld | T | G | FG | P |
|---|---|---|---|---|---|---|
| 1997–02 | North Qld Cowboys | 64 | 9 | 6 | 0 | 48 |
| 2006 | Sydney Roosters | 10 | 1 | 0 | 0 | 0 |
| | Total | 74 | 10 | 6 | 0 | 48 |
Representative
| Years | Team | Pld | T | G | FG | P |
| 2001–02 | Queensland | 3 | 1 | 0 | 0 | 4 |

John Doyle (born 31 July 1977) is a former professional rugby league footballer who played for the North Queensland Cowboys and the Sydney Roosters in the NRL.

== Background ==
Born in Rockhampton, Queensland. Doyle was educated at North Rockhampton State High School.

John played junior rugby league for Yeppoon Seagulls.

== Playing career ==
After retiring from football to live in Queensland, he signed a 1-year deal at the end of the 2005 season after Ricky Stuart contacted him to play with the Sydney Roosters in the National Rugby League. He signed for another year with the Sydney Roosters, however in late February (2007) during training camp he had decided to retire due to ongoing knee problems.

Played three games for Queensland (scored 1 try for 4 points)

Played 74 first grade games (scored 10 tries and kicked 6 goals for 52 points)

== Career highlights ==
- Rep honours: 3 games Qld 2001–02
- Junior clubs: Yeppoon Seagulls
- FG debut: North Queensland v Hunter Mariners, Breakers Stadium, 22 March 1997 (Rd 4)
