= 1995 North Queensland Cowboys season =

1st season in the club history

Coordinates: 19°18′58″S 146°42′43″E

- ARL Rank: 20th
- Play-off result: Missed finals
- 1995 record: Wins: 2; draws: 0; losses: 20
- Points scored: For: 269; against: 660

Team information
- CEO: Kerry Boustead
- Coach: Grant Bell
- Captain: Laurie Spina
- Stadium: Stockland Stadium
- Avg. attendance: 21,670
- High attendance: 24,855 (vs. Brisbane Broncos, Round 5)

Top scorers
- Tries: David Bouveng, Justin Loomans (9)
- Goals: Jonathan Davies (19)
- Points: Jonathan Davies (43)
1996 →

The 1995 North Queensland Cowboys season was the first in the club's history. Coached by Grant Bell and captained by Laurie Spina, they competed in the ARL Premiership.

== Season summary ==
Two years after being admitted into Australia's premier rugby league competition, the North Queensland Cowboys played their first official premiership game on Saturday, March 11. Led by inaugural captain and Ingham local Laurie Spina, the club faced the Sydney Bulldogs in front of a crowd of 23,156 at Stockland Stadium. There was no fairy tale beginning for the club, as centre Adrian Vowles was sent off for a high shot six minutes into the match and the Bulldogs won the game 32-16. Teenage fullback Damian Gibson, who was making his first grade debut, scored the club's first premiership try.

The club found little success during their debut season in the premiership. They began the season with seven straight losses before picking up their first ever win against the Illawarra Steelers at Steelers Stadium in Round 8. A six-game losing streak followed, which was then snapped in Round 15, when the club recorded their first ever home win, defeating the Western Suburbs Magpies. It would be the last time the club enjoyed victory that season, as they ended the year with seven consecutive losses. The Cowboys finished 1995 in 20th place, winning the dreaded wooden spoon, with just two wins from 22 games.

Former Eastern Suburbs Roosters prop Wayne Sing, who played 20 games, was named Player of the Year and Players' Player at the end of the season. The Cowboys would also have three players participate in the 1995 Rugby League World Cup. Jonathan Davies (a former Welsh rugby union international) and Kevin Ellis (who spent the entire season in reserve grade) both represented Wales, while Robert Piva (a recruit from Wakefield Trinity) represented Western Samoa.

Perhaps the one bright spot from the Cowboys' inaugural season was the debut of young Proserpine centre Paul Bowman. Bowman, who played seven games in 1995, would go onto captain the club and play 203 games over 13 seasons. Following his retirement in 2007, the club renamed their Player of the Year award the Paul Bowman Medal in his honour. He would join the club's coaching staff as an assistant coach and later their high performance manager, being on the staff for their NRL Premiership and 2016 World Club Challenge winning sides.

=== Milestones ===
- Round 1: The club played their first premiership game (losing 16-32 to the Canterbury Bulldogs).
- Round 1: Damian Gibson scored the club's first try.
- Round 1: Damian Gibson and Ian Dunemann made their first grade debuts.
- Round 2: David Maiden made his first grade debut.
- Round 3: Glen Murphy made his first grade debut.
- Round 4: Steven Holmes and Justin Loomans made their first grade debuts.
- Round 5: Peter Jones made his first grade debut.
- Round 7: Justin Loomans became the first player to score two tries in a match for the club.
- Round 8: The club won their first game (def. Illawarra Steelers 14-10).
- Round 14: Michael Hogue made his first grade debut.
- Round 15: Faron Anderson and Reggie Cressbrook made their first grade debuts.
- Round 15: The club won their first home game, and scored 30 points in a match for the first time.
- Round 16: Paul Bowman made his first grade debut.
- Round 19: Ray Blackman made his first grade debut.
- Round 20: Aaron Ketchell made his first grade debut.
- Round 22: Andrew Meads and Noel Slade made their first grade debuts.

== Squad list ==
North Queensland Cowboys ARL Squad 1995
First team squad				Coaching staff
Faron Anderson – WG; George Bartlett – SR; Martin Bella – PR; Ray Blackman – WG; David Bouveng – WG; Paul Bowman – CE; Shane Christensen – HK; Reggie Cressbrook – FB; Jonathan Davies – FE; Ian Dunemann – HB; Kevin Ellis – HB	Jason Erba – HK; Paul Galea – LK; Damian Gibson – WG; Leigh Groves – SR; Michael Hogue – PR; Steven Holmes – FB; Peter Jones – FE; Aaron Ketchell – SR; Justin Loomans – WG; David Maiden – CE; Jason Martin – HB	Jamie Mathiou – PR; Andrew Meads – LK; Craig Menkins – HK; Willie Morganson – CE; Paul Morris – WG; Glen Murphy – SR; Robert Piva – PR; Ian Russell – SR; Dean Schifilliti – HK; Bruce Sinclair – PR; Wayne Sing – SR	John Skardon – HK; Noel Slade – SR; Noel Solomon – FE; Laurie Spina (c) – HB; Craig Teitzel – PR; Adrian Vowles – CE; Andrew Whittington – PR	Head coach: Grant Bell; Legend: (c) Captain(s); (vc) Vice-captain(s)

== Squad movement ==
=== 1995 Gains ===
Player	Signed from
George Bartlett	North Sydney Bears
Martin Bella	Canterbury-Bankstown Bulldogs
David Bouveng	Gold Coast Seagulls
Shane Christensen	Newcastle Knights
Jonathan Davies	Warrington Wolves
Kevin Ellis	Warrington Wolves
Jason Erba	Brisbane Broncos
Paul Galea	Gold Coast Seagulls
Damian Gibson	Newcastle Knights
Leigh Groves	Gold Coast Seagulls
Jason Martin	Newcastle Knights
Jamie Mathiou	North Sydney Bears
Craig Menkins	Western Suburbs Magpies
Willie Morganson	Brisbane Broncos
Paul Morris	Brisbane Broncos
Robert Piva	Wakefield Trinity
Ian Russell	Illawarra Steelers
Dean Schifilliti	South Sydney Rabbitohs
Bruce Sinclair	Eastern Suburbs Roosters
Wayne Sing	Eastern Suburbs Roosters
John Skardon	Gold Coast Seagulls
Noel Solomon	North Sydney Bears
Laurie Spina	Herbert River Crushers
Craig Teitzel	Warrington Wolves
Adrian Vowles	Gold Coast Seagulls
Andrew Whittington	Gold Coast Seagulls

== Ladder ==
	Team	Pld	W	D	L	PF	PA	PD	Pts
1	Manly-Warringah Sea Eagles	22	20	0	2	687	248	+439	40
2	Canberra Raiders	22	20	0	2	634	255	+379	40
3	Brisbane Broncos	22	17	0	5	600	364	+236	34
4	Cronulla-Sutherland Sharks	22	16	0	6	516	287	+229	32
5	Newcastle Knights	22	15	0	7	549	396	+153	30
6	Sydney Bulldogs (P)	22	14	0	8	468	352	+116	28
7	St. George Dragons	22	13	0	9	583	382	+201	26
8	North Sydney Bears	22	11	2	9	542	331	+211	24
9	Sydney City Roosters	22	12	0	10	466	406	+60	24
10	Auckland Warriors	22	13	0	9	544	493	+51	24
11	Western Reds	22	11	0	11	361	549	-188	22
12	Illawarra Steelers	22	10	1	11	519	431	+88	21
13	Western Suburbs Magpies	22	10	0	12	459	534	-75	20
14	Penrith Panthers	22	9	0	13	481	484	-3	18
15	Sydney Tigers	22	7	0	15	309	591	-282	14
16	South Queensland Crushers	22	6	1	15	303	502	-199	13
17	Gold Coast Seagulls	22	4	1	17	350	628	-278	9
18	South Sydney Rabbitohs	22	4	1	17	319	686	-367	9
19	Parramatta Eels	22	3	0	19	310	690	-380	6
20	North Queensland Cowboys	22	2	0	20	269	660	-391	4

- Auckland Warriors were stripped of 2 competition points due to exceeding the replacement limit in round 3.

== Fixtures ==
=== Regular season ===
Date	Round	Opponent	Venue	Score	Tries	Goals	Attendance
11 March	Round 1	Sydney Bulldogs	Stockland Stadium	16 – 32	Gibson, Groves	Dunemann (3/4), Gibson (1/1)	23,156
19 March	Round 2	Sydney City Roosters	Sydney Football Stadium	16 – 34	Bouveng, Galea, Mathiou	Duneman (2/3)	6,585
26 March	Round 3	Sydney Tigers	Parramatta Stadium	16 – 38	Bouveng, Galea, Morganson	Duneman (2/4)	5,424
1 April	Round 4	Canberra Raiders	Stockland Stadium	8 – 14	Bartlett, Bouveng	Vowles (0/2)	23,561
8 April	Round 5	Brisbane Broncos	Stockland Stadium	12 – 20	Galea, Loomans, Spina	Jones (0/1), Vowles (0/3)	24,855
16 April	Round 6	North Sydney Bears	North Sydney Oval	6 – 60	Morganson	Vowles (1/1)	6,707
22 April	Round 7	Manly Sea Eagles	Stockland Stadium	14 – 36	Loomans (2), Bouveng	Holmes (1/3)	22,167
30 April	Round 8	Illawarra Steelers	Steelers Stadium	14 – 10	Bouveng (2), Vowles	Vowles (1/2), Holmes (0/2)	8,914
6 May	Round 9	Parramatta Eels	Parramatta Stadium	4 – 20	Bouveng	Vowles (0/1)	4,145
20 May	Round 10	Sydney City Roosters	Stockland Stadium	16 – 20	Loomans (2), Bouveng	Davies (2/5)	20,860
4 June	Round 11	Newcastle Knights	Marathon Stadium	14 – 44	Christensen, Davies, Gibson	Davies (1/3)	15,577
10 June	Round 12	Cronulla Sharks	Caltex Field	10 – 34	Loomans, Martin	Holmes (1/1), Morganson (0/1)	5,128
24 June	Round 13	Sydney Tigers	Stockland Stadium	14 – 28	Dunemann, Loomans	Davies (3/5)	20,113
1 July	Round 14	Penrith Panthers	Penrith Stadium	10 – 40	Bouveng	Davies (3/3)	5,774
8 July	Round 15	Western Suburbs Magpies	Stockland Stadium	31 – 12	Bartlett, Dunemann, Gibson, Martin, Skardon	Davies (5/6, 1 FG)	18,112
15 July	Round 16	South Sydney Rabbitohs	Sydney Football Stadium	16 – 30	Loomans (2), Galea	Cressbrook (1/1), Davies (1/3)	4,225
22 July	Round 17	Gold Coast Seagulls	Stockland Stadium	8 – 10	Martin	Davies (2/2)	20,067
29 July	Round 18	Auckland Warriors	Stockland Stadium	10 – 28	Jones, Vowles	Davies (1/2)	23,521
6 August	Round 19	South Queensland Crushers	Suncorp Stadium	6 – 22	Bowman	Davies (1/2)	17,105
12 August	Round 20	Western Reds	Stockland Stadium	10 – 12	Blackman, Jones	Cressbrook (1/3)	19,675
20 August	Round 21	St George Dragons	Stockland Stadium	14 – 50	Skardon, Vowles	Cressbrook (3/3)	22,283
27 August	Round 22	Sydney Bulldogs	Belmore Oval	4 – 66	Skardon	Cressbrook (0/1)	18,818
Legend: Win Loss Draw Bye

== Statistics ==
Name	App	T	G	FG	Pts
Faron Anderson	2	-	-	-	-
George Bartlett	21	2	-	-	8
Martin Bella	14	-	-	-	-
Ray Blackman	3	1	-	-	4
David Bouveng	16	9	-	-	36
Paul Bowman	7	1	-	-	4
Shane Christensen	10	1	-	-	4
Reggie Cressbrook	8	-	5	-	10
Jonathan Davies	9	1	19	1	43
Ian Dunemann	13	2	7	-	22
Jason Erba	5	-	-	-	-
Paul Galea	19	4	-	-	16
Damian Gibson	20	3	1	-	14
Leigh Groves	17	1	-	-	4
Michael Hogue	4	-	-	-	-
Steven Holmes	5	-	2	-	4
Peter Jones	12	2	-	-	8
Aaron Ketchell	3	-	-	-	-
Justin Loomans	16	9	-	-	36
David Maiden	2	-	-	-	-
Jason Martin	8	3	-	-	12
Jamie Mathiou	7	1	-	-	4
Andrew Meads	1	-	-	-	-
Craig Menkins	4	-	-	-	-
Willie Morganson	8	2	-	-	8
Paul Morris	2	-	-	-	-
Glen Murphy	1	-	-	-	-
Robert Piva	9	-	-	-	-
Ian Russell	11	-	-	-	-
Dean Schifilliti	1	-	-	-	-
Bruce Sinclair	11	-	-	-	-
Wayne Sing	20	-	-	-	-
John Skardon	16	3	-	-	12
Noel Slade	1	-	-	-	-
Noel Solomon	6	-	-	-	-
Laurie Spina	13	1	-	-	4
Craig Teitzel	12	-	-	-	-
Adrian Vowles	20	3	2	-	16
Andrew Whittington	11	-	-	-	-
Totals		49	36	1	269

== Representatives ==
The following players played a representative match in 1995.

	World Cup
Jonathan Davies	Wales
Kevin Ellis	Wales
Robert Piva	Western Samoa

== Honours ==
=== Club ===
- Player of the Year: Wayne Sing
- Players' Player: Wayne Sing
- Club Person of the Year: Paul Galea
