= 1996 North Queensland Cowboys season =

Coordinates: 19°18′58″S 146°42′43″E

- ARL Rank: 17th
- Play-off result: Missed finals
- 1996 record: Wins: 6; draws: 0; losses: 15
- Points scored: For: 288; against: 643

Team information
- Coach: Graham Lowe
- Captain: Adrian Vowles
- Stadium: Stockland Stadium
- Avg. attendance: 19,366
- High attendance: 27,096 (vs. South Sydney Rabbitohs, Round 16)

Top scorers
- Tries: David Bouveng, Kris Tassell (8)
- Goals: Shane Howarth (21)
- Points: Shane Howarth (49)
← 1995	1997 →

The 1996 North Queensland Cowboys season was the 2nd in the club's history. Coached by Graham Lowe and captained by Adrian Vowles, they competed in the Optus Cup.

== Season summary ==
After finishing their debut season in last place, there was nowhere to go but up for the Cowboys in 1996. Under new head coach, former New Zealand, Queensland, Manly and Wigan boss Graham Lowe, the club recruited fairly strongly bringing in first grade regulars Jason Death (from Canberra) and Andrew Dunemann (from Gold Coast), former All Black Shane Howarth and New Zealand representatives Se'e Solomona and Whetu Taewa. Dunemann's signing would see him reunite with his brother Ian, the pair becoming the first siblings to play for the club.

Due to the ongoing Super League war, the clubs affiliated with the breakaway competition refused to participate in their Round 1 games, with the Cowboys' opening fixture, against fellow Super League-aligned club the Canterbury Bulldogs, cancelled. After losing their first game of the year against the Sydney City Roosters, the Cowboys picked up their first win of the season a week later against the Sydney Tigers. Seven straight losses followed until a Round 11 victory over the Newcastle Knights was followed by a win over the Cronulla Sharks, the club's first ever back-to-back wins. After four straight losses, the Cowboys ended the season in their strongest form to date, with three wins from their final six games. That included a win over the St George Dragons at Kogarah Oval in Round 21, the club's first win in Sydney. The club would end their second season in 17th place, with six wins from 21 games, tripling their win total from the year before. Steve Edmed, a long time Balmain Tiger who joined the Cowboys for the 1996 season, was named Player of the Year after playing in all 21 games in his lone season with the club.

The club made headlines during the season when Moranbah junior Josh Hannay was named to make his first grade debut at just 16-years old. The selection was later vetoed by the Australian Rugby League as Hannay was not 16 when the year began. Had he played, he would have been the second youngest player to make his senior debut in Australian rugby league history. Hannay would make his debut two years later and go onto play 150 games for the club over nine seasons.

=== Milestones ===
- Round 2: Jason Death, Steve Edmed, Martin Locke, Whetu Taewa and Kris Tassell made their debuts for the club.
- Round 2: Shane Howarth made his first grade debut.
- Round 3: Willie Poching made his debut for the club.
- Round 3: Scott Brown made his debut for the club.
- Round 6: Se'e Solomona made his debut for the club.
- Round 7: Andrew Dunemann made his debut for the club.
- Round 9: Andrew Bulmer made his first grade debut.
- Round 11: Michael Coorey made his first grade debut.
- Round 12: The club won back-to-back games for the first time.
- Round 13: John Buttigieg made his first grade debut.
- Round 15: Marshall Miller and Graham White made their first grade debuts.
- Round 17: Liam Johnson made his first grade debut.

== Squad list ==
North Queensland Cowboys ARL Squad 1996
First team squad			Coaching staff
Faron Anderson – WG; George Bartlett – SR; David Bouveng – WG; Paul Bowman – CE; Scott Brown – FE; Andrew Bulmer – SR; John Buttigieg – PR; Michael Coorey – SR; Reggie Cressbrook – FB; Jason Death – HK; Andrew Dunemann – FE; Ian Dunemann – HB; Steve Edmed – PR	Paul Galea – SR; Damian Gibson – WG; Leigh Groves – PR; Shane Howarth – FB; Liam Johnson – SR; Peter Jones – LK; Aaron Ketchell – SR; Martin Locke – PR; Justin Loomans – WG; Jason Martin – HB; Jamie Mathiou – PR; Marshall Miller – WG; Willie Morganson – CE	Glen Murphy – SR; Willie Poching – SR; Ian Russell – SR; Dean Schifilliti – LK; Wayne Sing – SR; John Skardon – WG; Se'e Solomona – PR; Whetu Taewa – CE; Kris Tassell – WG; Adrian Vowles (c) – CE; Graham White – PR	Head coach: Graham Lowe; Assistant coach: Mark Graham (assistant coach); Legend: (c) Captain(s); (vc) Vice-captain(s)

== Squad movement ==
=== 1996 Gains ===
Player	Signed from
Scott Brown	Cronulla Sharks
Jason Death	Canberra Raiders
Andrew Dunemann	Gold Coast Chargers
Steve Edmed	Sydney Tigers
Shane Howarth	Auckland RU
Martin Locke	South Queensland Crushers
Willie Poching	Auckland Warriors
Se'e Solomona	Auckland Warriors
Whetu Taewa	Auckland Warriors
Kris Tassell	Canterbury Bulldogs

=== 1996 Losses ===
Player	Signed To
Martin Bella	Gold Coast Chargers
Jonathan Davies	Cardiff RFC
Kevin Ellis	Gold Coast Chargers
Jason Erba	Sheffield Eagles
Michael Hogue	Paris Saint-Germain
David Maiden	Cairns Cyclones
Andrew Meads	Sydney Tigers
Craig Menkins	Paris Saint-Germain
Ian Russell	Paris Saint-Germain (mid-season)
Laurie Spina	Retired

== Ladder ==
	Team	Pld	W	D	L	PF	PA	PD	Pts
1	Manly-Warringah Sea Eagles (P)	22	18	0	4	549	191	+358	36
2	Brisbane Broncos	21	17	0	4	607	263	+344	34
3	North Sydney Bears	22	15	2	5	598	325	+273	32
4	Sydney City Roosters	22	15	1	6	521	321	+200	31
5	Cronulla-Sutherland Sharks	21	14	2	5	399	268	+131	30
6	Canberra Raiders	21	13	1	7	538	384	+154	27
7	St. George Dragons	21	12	1	8	443	360	+83	27
8	Western Suburbs Magpies	22	12	1	9	394	434	−40	25
9	Newcastle Knights	21	10	1	10	416	388	+28	23
10	Canterbury-Bankstown Bulldogs	21	11	0	10	375	378	−3	22
11	Auckland Warriors	21	10	0	11	412	427	−15	22
12	Sydney Tigers	22	11	0	11	319	459	−140	22
13	Parramatta Eels	21	9	1	11	404	415	−11	21
14	Illawarra Steelers	22	8	0	14	403	444	−41	16
15	Penrith Panthers	21	7	1	13	363	464	−101	15
16	Western Reds	21	6	1	14	313	420	−107	13
17	North Queensland Cowboys	21	6	0	15	288	643	−355	12
18	Gold Coast Chargers	22	5	1	16	359	521	−162	11
19	South Sydney Rabbitohs	22	5	1	16	314	634	−320	11
20	South Queensland Crushers	21	3	0	18	220	496	−276	8

== Fixtures ==
=== Regular season ===
Date	Round	Opponent	Venue	Score	Tries	Goals	Attendance
23 March	Round 1	Canterbury Bulldogs	Stockland Stadium		Cancelled due to Super League clubs refusing to play		
30 March	Round 2	Sydney City Roosters	Stockland Stadium	2 – 40		Howarth (1/1)	16,186
6 April	Round 3	Sydney Tigers	Stockland Stadium	17 – 2	Tassell (2), Peter Jones	Cressbrook (2/4), Howarth (1 FG)	15,912
14 April	Round 4	Canberra Raiders	Bruce Stadium	10 – 66	Bartlett, Taewa	Howarth (1/2)	9,115
21 April	Round 5	Brisbane Broncos	ANZ Stadium	14 – 58	Skardon, Tassell, Vowles	Howarth (1/3)	18,609
27 April	Round 6	North Sydney Bears	Stockland Stadium	6 – 50	Skardon	Howarth (1/2)	20,864
5 May	Round 7	Manly Sea Eagles	Brookvale Oval	4 – 46	Edmed	Cressbrook (0/1)	5,227
11 May	Round 8	Illawarra Steelers	Stockland Stadium	8 – 24	Tassell (2)	Cressbrook (0/2)	15,289
25 May	Round 9	Parramatta Eels	Stockland Stadium	12 – 26	Loomans, Tassell	Cressbrook (1/2), Poching (1/1)	12,088
9 June	Round 10	Sydney City Roosters	SFS	14 – 38	I. Dunemann, Tassell, Vowles	Poching (1/3)	9,287
15 June	Round 11	Newcastle Knights	Stockland Stadium	26 – 10	Loomans (2), Death, Murphy, Tassell	Cressbrook (3/3), I. Dunemann (0/1), Poching (0/2)	14,153
22 June	Round 12	Cronulla Sharks	Stockland Stadium	16 – 10	Bouveng, Cressbrook, Gibson	Cressbrook (2/3)	22,014
29 June	Round 13	Sydney Tigers	Parramatta Stadium	16 – 18	Coorey, A. Dunemann, Gibson	Cressbrook (2/2), Poching (0/1)	4,257
6 July	Round 14	Penrith Panthers	Stockland Stadium	0 – 21			25,068
14 July	Round 15	Western Suburbs Magpies	Campbelltown Stadium	32 – 40	Miller (2), Cressbrook, A. Dunemann, Loomans, Morganson	Cressbrook (2/3), Vowles (2/2), Poching (0/1)	5,281
20 July	Round 16	South Sydney Rabbitohs	Stockland Stadium	20 – 22	Bowman, I. Dunemann, Loomans	Howarth (3/3), Vowles (1/1)	27,096
26 July	Round 17	Gold Coast Chargers	Carrara Stadium	24 – 14	Bowman, Howarth, Loomans	Howarth (6/6)	5,777
3 August	Round 18	Auckland Warriors	Ericsson Stadium	6 – 52	Death	Howarth (1/1)	14,600
9 August	Round 19	South Queensland Crushers	Stockland Stadium	11 – 6	Miller (2)	Howarth (1/3, 1 FG)	24,989
17 August	Round 20	Western Reds	WACA	4 – 30	Taewa	Howarth (0/1)	5,889
25 August	Round 21	St George Dragons	Kogarah Oval	24 – 20	Gibson (2), Johnson, Loomans	Howarth (3/4, 1 FG), A. Dunemann (1 FG)	9,062
1 September	Round 22	Canterbury Bulldogs	Belmore Oval	22 – 50	Death, Locke, Loomans, Morganson	Howarth (3/4)	6,595
Legend: Win Loss Draw Bye

== Statistics ==
Name	App	T	G	FG	Pts
Faron Anderson	1	-	-	-	-
George Bartlett	6	1	-	-	4
David Bouveng	5	1	-	-	4
Paul Bowman	6	2	-	-	8
Scott Brown	6	-	-	-	-
Andrew Bulmer	1	-	-	-	-
John Buttigieg	9	-	-	-	-
Michael Coorey	11	1	-	-	4
Reggie Cressbrook	15	2	12	-	32
Jason Death	20	3	-	-	12
Andrew Dunemann	16	2	-	1	9
Ian Dunemann	13	2	-	-	8
Steve Edmed	21	1	-	-	4
Paul Galea	5	-	-	-	-
Damian Gibson	11	4	-	-	16
Leigh Groves	2	-	-	-	-
Shane Howarth	12	1	21	3	49
Liam Johnson	6	1	-	-	4
Peter Jones	19	1	-	-	4
Aaron Ketchell	6	-	-	-	-
Martin Locke	11	1	-	-	4
Justin Loomans	21	8	-	-	32
Jason Martin	12	-	-	-	-
Jamie Mathiou	4	-	-	-	-
Marshall Miller	6	4	-	-	16
Willie Morganson	4	2	-	-	8
Glen Murphy	15	1	-	-	4
Willie Poching	16	-	2	-	4
Ian Russell	1	-	-	-	-
Dean Schifilliti	10	-	-	-	-
Wayne Sing	15	-	-	-	-
John Skardon	3	2	-	-	8
Se'e Solomona	4	-	-	-	-
Whetu Taewa	12	2	-	-	8
Kris Tassell	9	8	-	-	32
Adrian Vowles	21	2	3	-	14
Graham White	1	-	-	-	-
Totals		52	38	4	288

== Honours ==
=== Club ===
- Player of the Year: Steve Edmed
- Players' Player: Steve Edmed
- Club Person of the Year: Martin Locke
