= List of North Queensland Cowboys honours =

The Australian rugby league team North Queensland Cowboys and individual team members have won a variety of titles and honours since their foundation in 1995. The club has appeared in three grand finals of the National Rugby League premiership, winning in 2015, and has reached the finals ten times. Individual player awards include the Paul Bowman Medal and other honours awarded annually by the club itself and by external bodies, such as the Rugby League World Golden Boot Award which has gone to the Cowboys' Johnathan Thurston three times.

== Team honours ==
=== Premierships ===
Year	Opponent	Score
2015	Brisbane Broncos	17–16

=== Runners-up ===
Year	Opponent	Score
2005	Wests Tigers	16–30
2017	Melbourne Storm	6–34

=== Minor premierships ===
None

=== Finals appearances ===
- 12 - 2004, 2005, 2007, 2011, 2012, 2013, 2014, 2015, 2016, 2017, 2022 and 2024.

== Club awards ==
Each year the Paul Bowman Medal is awarded to the Cowboys' best and fairest player of the season. The medal was named after Bowman, following his retirement in 2007.

=== Men's ===
==== Paul Bowman Medal ====
Year	Nat	Winner	Position
1995	(Australia)	Wayne Sing	Second-row
1996	(Australia)	Steve Edmed	Prop
1997	(Australia)	Owen Cunningham	Second-row
1998	(New Zealand)	John Lomax	Prop
1999	(Australia)	Paul Bowman	Lock
2000	(Australia) (Australia)	Paul Bowman; Julian O'Neill	Centre; Centre
2001	(Australia)	Glenn Morrison	Lock
2002	(Australia)	Matt Sing	Wing
2003	(New Zealand)	Paul Rauhihi	Prop
2004	(Australia)	Luke O'Donnell	Second-row
2005	(Australia)	Johnathan Thurston	Five-eighth
2006	(Australia)	Aaron Payne	Hooker
2007	(Australia)	Matthew Bowen	Fullback
2008	(Australia)	Aaron Payne	Hooker
2009	(Australia)	Luke O'Donnell	Lock
2010	(Australia)	Matthew Scott	Prop
2011	(Australia)	Ashley Graham	Wing
2012	(Australia)	Johnathan Thurston	Five-eighth
2013	(Australia)	Matthew Scott	Prop
2014	(Australia)	Johnathan Thurston	Five-eighth
2015	(Australia)	Johnathan Thurston	Halfback
2016	(Tonga)	Jason Taumalolo	Lock
2017	(Tonga)	Jason Taumalolo	Lock
2018	(Tonga)	Jason Taumalolo	Lock
2019	(Tonga)	Jason Taumalolo	Lock
2020	(Tonga)	Jason Taumalolo	Lock
2021	(Australia)	Coen Hess	Prop
2022	(Tonga)	Jason Taumalolo	Lock
2023	(Australia)	Scott Drinkwater	Fullback
2024	(Australia)	Tom Dearden	Five-eighth
2025	(Australia)	Tom Dearden	Halfback

==== Players' Player ====
Year	Nat	Winner	Position
1995	(Australia)	Wayne Sing	Second-row
1996	(Australia)	Steve Edmed	Prop
1997	(New Zealand)	John Lomax	Prop
1998	(New Zealand)	John Lomax	Prop
1999	(Australia)	John Buttigieg	Prop
2000	(Australia)	Tim Brasher	Fullback
2001	(Australia)	Glenn Morrison	Lock
2002	(Australia)	Matt Sing	Wing
2003	(Australia)	Matt Sing	Wing
2004	(New Zealand)	Paul Rauhihi	Prop
2005	(Australia)	Paul Bowman	Centre
2006	(Australia)	Luke O'Donnell	Second-row
2007	(Australia)	Matthew Bowen	Fullback
2008	(Australia)	Aaron Payne	Hooker
2009	(Australia)	Luke O'Donnell	Lock
2010	(Australia)	Matthew Scott	Prop
2011	(Australia)	Johnathan Thurston	Halfback
2012	(Australia)	James Tamou	Prop
2013	(Australia)	Matthew Scott	Prop
2014	(Australia)	Johnathan Thurston	Five-eighth
2015	(Australia)	Jake Granville	Hooker
2016	(Tonga)	Jason Taumalolo	Lock
2017	(Australia) (Tonga)	Michael Morgan; Jason Taumalolo	Halfback; Lock
2018	(Tonga)	Jason Taumalolo	Lock
2019	(Australia)	Jordan McLean	Prop
2020	(Australia)	Josh McGuire	Prop
2021	(Australia)	Murray Taulagi	Wing
2022	(Australia)	Tom Dearden	Five-eighth
2023	(Australia)	Scott Drinkwater	Fullback
2024	(Australia)	Tom Dearden	Five-eighth
2025	(Australia)	Tom Dearden	Halfback

==== Club Person of the Year ====
Year	Nat	Winner	Position
1995	(Australia)	Paul Galea	Lock
1996	(Australia)	Martin Locke	Prop
1997	(Australia)	Ian Roberts	Prop
1998	(Australia)	Scott Mahon	Fullback
1999	(Australia)	Barry Buchanan	-
2000	(Australia)	Cowboys' Supporters Team	-
2001	(Australia)	Peter Jones	Second-row
2002	(Australia)	Martin Locke	Prop
2003	(Australia)	Ty Williams	Wing
2004	(Australia)	Dave Roberts	-
2005	(Australia)	Rod Jensen	Second-row
2006	(Australia)	Glen Murphy	-
2007	(Australia)	Nicole Balanzategui; Tim Nugent	-
2008	(Australia)	Aaron Payne	Hooker
2009	(Australia)	Clint Amos	Hooker
2010	(Australia)	Jeff Reibel	-
2011	(Australia)	Gavin Cooper	Second-row
2012	(Australia)	Johnathan Thurston	Five-eighth
2013	(Australia)	Kevin Marty	-
2014	(Fiji)	Ashton Sims	Prop
2015	(Australia)	Glenn Hall	Second-row
2016	(Samoa)	John Asiata	Prop
2017	(Australia) (Papua New Guinea)	Scott Bolton; Ray Thompson	Prop; Halfback
2018	(Australia)	Johnathan Thurston	Halfback
2019	(Australia)	Ben Hampton	Wing
2020	(Tonga)	John Asiata	Prop
2021	(Australia)	Ben Hampton	Halfback
2022	(Australia)	Tom Gilbert	Second-row
2023	(Australia)	James Tamou	Prop
2024	(Australia)	Coen Hess	Prop
2025	(Australia)	Braidon Burns	Wing

==== Rookie of the Year ====
Year	Nat	Winner	Position
2007	(Australia)	Sam Faust	Second-row
2008	(Australia)	Nick Slyney	Lock
2009	(Australia)	Steve Rapira	Lock
2010	(Samoa)	Leeson Ah Mau	Second-row
2011	(Fiji)	Tariq Sims	Second-row
2012	(Tonga)	Jason Taumalolo	Second-row
2013	(Australia)	Kyle Feldt	Wing
2014	(Samoa)	John Asiata	Prop
2015	(Australia)	Coen Hess	Second-row
2016	(Australia)	Javid Bowen	Centre
2017	(Australia)	Corey Jensen	Prop
2018	(Australia)	Jake Clifford	Halfback
2019	(Australia)	Shane Wright	Second-row
2020	(Australia)	Hamiso Tabuai-Fidow	Wing
2021	(Australia)	Heilum Luki	Second-row
2022	(Australia)	Jeremiah Nanai	Second-row
2023	(New Zealand)	Kulikefu Finefeuiaki	Second-row
2024	(Australia)	Jaxon Purdue	Halfback
2025	(Papua New Guinea)	Robert Derby	Wing

==== Most Improved ====
Year	Nat	Winner	Position
2007	(Australia) (Australia)	Ray Cashmere; Ashley Graham	Prop; Centre
2008	(Australia)	Brandon Boor	Centre
2009	(Australia)	Scott Bolton	Second-row
2010	(Australia)	James Tamou	Prop
2011	(Papua New Guinea)	Ray Thompson	Five-eighth
2012	(Scotland)	Kane Linnett	Centre
2013	(Italy)	Joel Riethmuller	Lock
2014	(Australia)	Michael Morgan	Fullback
2015	(Australia)	Justin O'Neill	Centre
2016	(Australia)	Ethan Lowe	Second-row

==== Coach's Award ====
The Most Improved Award was replaced by the Coach's Award in 2017.

Year	Nat	Winner	Position
2017	(Australia)	Michael Morgan	Halfback
2018	(Australia)	Kyle Feldt	Wing
2019	(Cook Islands)	Francis Molo	Prop
2020	(Australia)	Mitchell Dunn	Second-row

==== Cowboys Way Award ====
The Coach's Award was replaced by the Cowboys Way award in 2021.

Year	Nat	Winner	Position
2021	(Australia)	Jake Granville	Hooker
2022	(Australia)	Tom Dearden	Five-eighth
2023	(Australia)	Jordan McLean	Prop
2024	(Australia)	Jake Granville	Hooker
2015	(Australia) (Australia)	Tom Chester; Heilum Luki	Fullback; Second-row

==== Member's Player of the Year ====
Year	Nat	Winner	Position
2014	(Australia)	Michael Morgan	Fullback
2015	(Australia)	Jake Granville	Hooker
2016	(Tonga)	Jason Taumalolo	Lock
2017	(Australia)	Michael Morgan	Halfback
2018	(Australia)	Kyle Feldt	Wing
2019	(Tonga)	Jason Taumalolo	Lock
2020	(Australia)	Kyle Feldt	Wing
2021	(Australia)	Jake Granville	Hooker
2022	(Australia)	Jeremiah Nanai	Second-row
2023	(Australia)	Reuben Cotter	Lock
2024	(Australia)	Tom Dearden	Five-eighth
2025	(Australia)	Tom Dearden	Halfback

==== Young Guns Cowboys Way Award ====
Year	Nat	Winner	Position
2022	(Papua New Guinea)	Robert Derby	Wing
2023	(Australia)	Wil Sullivan	Second-row
2024	(New Zealand)	Henry Teutau	Prop

=== Women's ===
==== NRLW Cowboys of the Year ====
Year	Nat	Winner	Position
2023	(Australia)	Emma Manzelmann	Hooker
2024	(Australia)	Bree Chester	Lock

==== Players' Player ====
Year	Nat	Winner	Position
2023	(Australia)	Emma Manzelmann	Hooker
2024	(Australia)	Jakiya Whitfeld	Centre

==== Rookie of the Year ====
Year	Nat	Winner	Position
2023	(England)	Fran Goldthorp	Fullback
2024	(Australia)	Lily Peacock	Prop

==== Cowboys Way Award ====
Year	Nat	Winner	Position
2023	(Australia)	China Polata	Centre
2024	(Australia)	Alisha Foord	Hooker

==== Fans Choice Player of the Year ====
Year	Nat	Winner	Position
2023	(Australia)	Kirra Dibb	Halfback
2024	(Australia)	Kirra Dibb	Halfback

==== Gold Stars Player of the Year ====
Year	Nat	Winner	Position
2021	(Australia)	Emma Manzelmann	Hooker
2022	(Australia)	Emma Manzelmann	Hooker

==== Gold Stars Cowboys Way Award ====
Year	Nat	Winner	Position
2021	(Australia)	Jordii-Rae Mahendrarajah	Second-row
2022	(Australia)	Sareka Mooka	Lock

== Individual honours ==
=== Golden Boot ===
The Golden Boot is awarded annually to the world's best player.

- 2011 Johnathan Thurston
- 2013 Johnathan Thurston
- 2015 Johnathan Thurston

=== Dally M Medal ===
The Dally M Medal is awarded to the best player over the NRL season.

- 2005 Johnathan Thurston
- 2007 Johnathan Thurston
- 2014 Johnathan Thurston
- 2015 Johnathan Thurston
- 2016 Jason Taumalolo

=== Wally Lewis Medal ===
The Wally Lewis medal is awarded each year to the State of Origin's man of the series.

- 2008 Johnathan Thurston
- 2023 Reuben Cotter
- 2025 Thomas Deardon

=== Dally M Team of the Year ===
Each year at the Dally M awards, the best players in their position during the NRL season are selected for the team of the year.

- 2004 Paul Rauhihi (Prop)
- 2005 Johnathan Thurston (Halfback)
- 2007 Matthew Bowen (Fullback)
- 2007 Johnathan Thurston (Halfback)
- 2009 Johnathan Thurston (Halfback)
- 2011 Matthew Scott (Prop)
- 2012 Johnathan Thurston (Five-Eighth)
- 2013 Johnathan Thurston (Five-Eighth)
- 2014 Johnathan Thurston (Five-Eighth)
- 2015 Johnathan Thurston (Halfback)
- 2015 Jason Taumalolo (Lock)
- 2016 Jason Taumalolo (Lock)
- 2017 Michael Morgan (Halfback)
- 2018 Jason Taumalolo (Lock)
- 2022 Valentine Holmes (Centre)
- 2022 Jeremiah Nanai (Second Row)
- 2024 Tom Dearden (Five-Eighth)

=== Dally M Coach of the Year ===
- 2022 Todd Payten

=== Dally M Rookie of the Year ===
- 2022 Jeremiah Nanai

=== RLPA Player of the Year ===
- 2005 Johnathan Thurston
- 2013 Johnathan Thurston
- 2014 Johnathan Thurston
- 2015 Johnathan Thurston
- 2016 Jason Taumalolo

=== RLIF Team of the Year ===
Awarded to the best players in the world at their position during the season by the Rugby League International Federation.

- 2009 Johnathan Thurston (Halfback)
- 2011 Matthew Scott (Prop)
- 2012 Johnathan Thurston (Five-Eighth)

=== RLW Player of the Year ===
Awarded each year since 1970 by the magazine Rugby League Week.

- 2007 Johnathan Thurston and Matthew Bowen
- 2016 Jason Taumalolo

=== NRL Nines Most Valuable Player ===
- 2020 Scott Drinkwater

== National Youth Competition honours ==
=== Team honours ===
Premierships

- None

Runners-up

- 1 - 2011 (lost 30–31 to the New Zealand Warriors)

Minor premierships

- None

Wooden spoons

- 1 - 2008

Finals appearances

- 5 - 2010, 2011, 2015, 2016, 2017

=== Club awards ===
Player of the Year
Year	Nat	Winner	Position
2008	(Australia)	Nick Slyney	Lock
2009	(Australia)	Dane Hogan	Lock
2010	(Tonga)	Jason Taumalolo	Second-row
2011	(Tonga)	Jason Taumalolo	Second-row
2012	(Australia)	Zac Santo	Fullback
2013	(Australia)	Jayden Hodges	Hooker
2014	(Australia)	Josh Chudleigh	Hooker
2015	(Australia)	Andrew Niemoeller	Lock
2016	(New Zealand)	Brandon Smith	Hooker
2017	(Australia)	Kurt Wiltshire	Centre

=== Individual honours ===
NYC Team of the Year

- 2010 James Segeyaro (Hooker)
- 2011 Jason Taumalolo (Second Row)
- 2011 Kyle Feldt (Interchange)
- 2012 Chris Grevsmuhl (Interchange)
- 2015 Gideon Gela-Mosby (Wing)
- 2015 Viliame Kikau (Prop)
- 2015 Coen Hess (Second Row)
- 2016 Kalyn Ponga (Fullback)
- 2016 Gideon Gela-Mosby (Wing)
- 2016 Brandon Smith (Hooker)
- 2017 Kalyn Ponga (Fullback)
- 2017 Jake Clifford (Interchange)

Dally M Player of the Year

- 2017 Jake Clifford

RLPA Player of the Year

- 2011 Jason Taumalolo
