= Jason Martin (rugby league) =

Australian rugby league footballer (born 1970)

Personal information
- Born: 14 September 1970 (age 55) Tamworth, New South Wales, Australia

Playing information
- Height: 163 cm (5 ft 4 in)
- Weight: 72 kg (11 st 5 lb)
- Position: Halfback, Five-eighth
Club
Years	Team	Pld	T	G	FG	P
1989–92	North Sydney Bears	66	2	0	0	19
1993–94	Newcastle Knights	16	2	0	0	8
1995–96	North Qld Cowboys	20	3	0	0	12
1997	Paris Saint-Germain	20	3	0	0	12
	Total	122	10	0	0	51

Jason Martin (born 14 September 1970) is an Australian former professional rugby league footballer who played in the 1990s. Primarily a halfback, he played for the North Sydney Bears, Newcastle Knights and the North Queensland Cowboys before moving to Paris Saint-Germain in the Super League.

== Background ==
Born in Tamworth, Martin grew up in Tea Gardens, just north of Newcastle. He attended Raymond Terrace High School, where represented the Australian Schoolboys in 1988, before signing with the North Sydney Bears.

== Playing career ==
=== North Sydney Bears ===
In Round 20 of the 1989 NSWRL season, Martin made his first grade debut as an 18-year old in North Sydney's 6–30 loss to the Parramatta Eels. In 1990, he had a breakout year for the Bears, playing 22 games and winning the Dally M Rookie of the Year and finishing second in voting for the Dally M medal.

In 1991, he was an important factor in the Bears' finals run, in which they made it to the preliminary final, and finished third in Rothmans Medal voting. In 1992, Martin's final year with North Sydney, Martin played 21 games, moving between halfback, hooker and lock.

An accomplished singer and guitarist, Martin released a single in 1991 called "Take Me to the Top", the video of which featured clips of Martin playing for North Sydney, and several of his Bears teammates singing backup vocals.

=== Newcastle Knights ===
In 1993, Martin returned to Newcastle, but was unable to cement his spot as the starting halfback, playing just 14 games. In 1994, he played just two games being stuck behind Newcastle's young star halfback Andrew Johns. His last match for the club was a loss to the Cronulla Sharks in the reserve grade Grand Final.

=== North Queensland Cowboys ===
In 1995, after two poor seasons at Newcastle, Martin looked to revive his career by signing with the newly established North Queensland Cowboys. Martin was appointed inaugural captain of the club but suffered a groin injury and a hernia, causing him to miss the first 10 weeks of the season. He made eight appearances in his first season at the club, captaining them five times. In 1996, he played 12 games, finishing the season in reserve grade.

=== Paris Saint-Germain ===
In 1997, Martin joined Paris Saint-Germain in the Super League, playing 20 games and scoring three tries.

== Achievements and accolades ==
=== Individual ===
- Dally M Rookie of the Year: 1990

== Statistics ==
=== NSWRL/ARL ===
Season	Team	Matches	T	G	GK %	F/G	Pts
1989	North Sydney	1	0	0	—	0	0
1990	North Sydney	22	1	0	—	0	4
1991	North Sydney	22	0	0	—	0	0
1992	North Sydney	21	1	0	—	1	5
1993	Newcastle	14	2	0	—	0	8
1994	Newcastle	2	0	0	—	0	0
1995	North Queensland	8	3	0	—	0	8
1996	North Queensland	12	0	0	—	0	0
Career totals		102	7	0	—	1	29

=== Super League ===
Season	Team	Matches	T	G	GK %	F/G	Pts
1997	Paris Saint-Germain	20	3	0	—	0	12
Career totals		20	3	0	—	0	12

== Discography ==
=== Singles ===
List of singles, with selected chart positions
Title	Year	Peak chart positions
Title	Year	AUS
"Take Us to the Top"	1991	145
