= George Bartlett =

George Bartlett may refer to:

- George A. Bartlett (1869–1951), American politician
- George Bartlett (cricketer) (born 1998), English cricketer
- George Bartlett (rugby league) (born 1968), Australian rugby league player
- George True Bartlett (1856–1949), U.S. Army general
- George L. Bartlett (1924–2024), United States Marine Corps general
