= Adrian Vowles =

Scotland international rugby league footballer

Personal information
- Born: 30 May 1971 (age 55) Charleville, Queensland, Australia

Playing information
- Height: 177 cm (5 ft 10 in)
- Weight: 83 kg (13 st 1 lb)
- Position: Lock, Centre
Club
Years	Team	Pld	T	G	FG	P
1993–94	Gold Coast Seagulls	38	6	7	0	38
1995–96	North Qld Cowboys	41	5	5	0	30
1997–01	Castleford Tigers	142	33	1	1	135
2002	Leeds Rhinos	17	2	0	0	8
2002–03	Wakefield Trinity Wildcats	27	6	1	0	26
2003–05	Castleford Tigers	6	0	0	0	0
	Total	271	52	14	1	237
Representative
Years	Team	Pld	T	G	FG	P
1994	Queensland	1	0	0	0	0
2000	Scotland	4	1	0	0	4

Coaching information
Representative
Years	Team	Gms	W	D	L	W%
2017–18	Queensland Women

Adrian Vowles (born 30 May 1971) is a former Scotland international rugby league footballer who played as a loose forward or centre in the 1990s and 2000s. He played in Australia for several years, gaining State of Origin selection in 1994, but spent the majority of his career in the Super League.

== Background ==
Born in Cunnamulla, Queensland, Vowles played his junior rugby league for the Cunnamulla Rams and for Charleville All Whites and Railways when he and his family moved there in 1982.

== Playing career ==
In Charleville, Vowles won two premierships with the All Whites club, before changing clubs and winning a premiership with Charleville Railways in 1988. In 1989 he moved to the Gold Coast, playing for the Tweed Heads Seagulls. In 1990 while playing for a Gold Coast under-21 representative side, he earned a reserve grade trial with the Gold Coast Seagulls, later signing with the club.

=== Gold Coast Seagulls ===
In Round 1 of the 1993 NSWRL season, Vowles made his first grade debut in the Seagulls' 10–14 loss to the Western Suburbs Magpies. After starting the first four games of the season off the bench, Vowles became one of the club's starting centres, playing 21 games. At the end of the season, he was named the club's Player of the Year.

In 1994, Vowles continued his good form and was selected for Queensland in Game II of that year's series. He came off the bench in Queensland's 0–14 loss to New South Wales at the Melbourne Cricket Ground.

=== North Queensland Cowboys ===
In 1995, Vowles joined the newly established North Queensland Cowboys, starting at centre in the club's inaugural game against the Sydney Bulldogs. In the same game, he became the first Cowboy to be sent off after a high shot on Bulldogs' centre Matthew Ryan just five minutes into the match. Vowles played 20 games for the Cowboys in 1995, captaining the side three times. In 1996, he became the club's full-time captain, playing 21 games at centre and lock.

At the end of the 1996 season, Vowles was let go by new coach Tim Sheens. In 2019, Vowles spoke about being released saying, "I didn't miss one game, played half the year with a torn groin and a hernia and it was late when I got told that I wasn't wanted. It was mid-November. We'd already come back and they named a 25-man Super League squad and I wasn't named. Tim Sheens sat in his chair and his exact words were, "You're not big enough, you're not fast enough, you're not strong enough and you've got limited ability". I don't mind that he didn't want me, but don't belittle me. There was a way to do it. I haven't seen him since that day but things happen for a reason".

After leaving the Cowboys, Vowles was offered to Super League clubs Adelaide, Canterbury and the Warriors but all three moves fell through.

=== Castleford Tigers ===
In 1997, Vowles moved to England to play with Castleford. In his first season with the club, he played 30 games, scoring eight tries. In 1998, he played 23 games, scoring six tries. Vowles enjoyed a breakout season in 1999, being named at lock in the Super League Dream Team and winning the Man of Steel award, becoming the first Castleford player and first Queenslander to do so.

In 2000, Vowles represented Scotland at the 2000 Rugby League World Cup, starting at lock in all three of their pool games, scoring one try. In 2001, he once again represented Scotland in a 42–20 win over France.

=== Leeds Rhinos ===
In 2002, Vowles moved to the Leeds Rhinos but played just 17 Super League games before making a mid-season switch to the Wakefield Trinity Wildcats, where he accepted a player-coach role.

=== Wakefield Trinity Wildcats ===
Alongside co-coach Shane McNally, Vowles helped save Wakefield from relegation in the 2002 season. Vowles remained with Wakefield until the final three matches of the 2003 season, when he was granted a release by the club to finish the season with Castleford.

=== Return to Castleford Tigers ===
In 2003, Vowles returned to the club to play the last three games of the 2003 season after being granted a release by Wakefield.

He returned to the Tigers again in 2005 for a brief spell in their promotion winning season in the Championship.

=== Later career ===
In 2004, Vowles returned to Queensland to play in the Queensland Cup for the Brisbane Broncos feeder club, the Toowoomba Clydesdales, captaining the side. At the end of the season he won the club's Player of the Year award. In 2005, he returned to the Gold Coast, joining the Burleigh Bears. That season, he start at lock in the Bears' Grand Final loss to the North Queensland Young Guns.

== Achievements and accolades ==
=== Individual ===
- Man of Steel award: 1999
- Super League Dream Team: 1999
- Gold Coast Seagulls Player of the Year: 1993

== Statistics ==
=== NSWRL/ARL ===
Season	Team	Matches	T	G	GK %	F/G	Pts
1993	Gold Coast	21	5	4	44.4	0	28
1994	Gold Coast	17	1	3	37.5	0	10
1995	North Queensland	20	3	2	22.2	0	16
1996	North Queensland	21	2	3	100.0	0	14
Career totals		79	11	12	41.38	0	68

=== Super League ===
Season	Team	Matches	T	G	GK %	F/G	Pts
1997	Castleford	25	8	1	—	0	34
1998	Castleford	23	6	0	—	0	24
1999	Castleford	28	10	0	—	0	40
2000	Castleford	29	4	0	—	0	16
2001	Castleford	21	4	0	—	0	16
2002	Leeds	17	2	0	—	0	8
2002	Wakefield Trinity	7	3	1	—	0	14
2003	Wakefield Trinity	20	3	0	—	0	12
2003	Castleford	3	0	0	—	0	0
Career totals		173	40	2	—	0	164

=== State of Origin ===
Season	Team	Matches	T	G	GK %	F/G	Pts
1994	Queensland	1	0	0	—	0	0
Career totals		1	0	0	—	0	0

=== International ===
Season	Team	Matches	T	G	GK %	F/G	Pts
2000	Scotland	3	1	0	—	0	4
2001	Scotland	1	0	0	—	0	0
Career totals		4	1	0	—	0	4

== Post-playing career ==
In 2006, Vowles became an assistant coach for Burleigh, before relinquishing the role to become the CEO of the club, a position he held until 2010.

In 2006, he was inducted into the Castleford Tigers Hall of Fame. In 2009, an Arriva Yorkshire bus was named after him as part of the Arriva Yorkshire Rugby League Dream Team.

In 2015, he was appointed assistant coach of the Australian Jillaroos and Queensland women's teams. In 2017, he took over as head coach of the Queensland women's side, holding the position for one year.

From 2012 to 2018, Vowles worked for Channel 9 as a commentator for the Queensland Cup. Since 2014, the Adrian Vowles Cup has been held annually in Charleville, featuring under-14 and under-16 boys and girls sides from throughout regional Queensland.

Vowles underwent heart surgery in 2025 after a health check-up uncovered a previously undiagnosed faulty valve.

In July 2026, Vowles returned for a visit to West Yorkshire to spend time with his former teammates at Castleford, Leeds and Wakefield. Ahead of Castleford's home fixture against Warrington, he was invited to speak to the playing squad on his experiences at the club. The following week, with Tigers head coach Ryan Carr absent for personal reasons, Vowles agreed at short notice to join the coaching staff for the match against Hull KR.
