= Andrew Whittington =

Andrew Whittington may refer to:

- Andrew Whittington (rugby league) (born 1971), Australian rugby league footballer
- Andrew Whittington (tennis) (born 1993), Australian tennis player
