= John Skardon =

Australian rugby league footballer

Personal information
- Born: Cairns, Queensland, Australia

Playing information
- Position: Wing, Centre, Five-eighth, Hooker
Club
Years	Team	Pld	T	G	FG	P
1993–94	Gold Coast Seagulls	27	7	0	0	28
1995–97	North Qld Cowboys	22	6	0	0	24
	Total	49	13	0	0	52

John Skardon is an Australian former professional rugby league footballer who played in the 1990s. A wing or centre, he played for the Gold Coast Seagulls and North Queensland Cowboys.

== Playing career ==
A Cairns Ivanhoes junior, Skardon represented Cairns in the Foley Shield competition before being signed by the Gold Coast Seagulls.

In Round 1 of the 1993 NSWRL season, Skardon made his first grade debut in the Seagulls' 10–14 loss to the Western Suburbs Magpies. In 1994, he became a regular for the Gold Coast, playing 18 games and scoring six tries.

In 1995, Skardon joined the newly established North Queensland Cowboys, starting on the wing in their inaugural match against the Sydney Bulldogs. He played 16 games for the club in their first season, moving to the hooker position halfway through the year. Over the next two seasons, Skardon played just six games for the Cowboys, before leaving at the end of the 1997 season.

== Statistics ==
=== NSWRL/ARL/Super League ===
Season	Team	Matches	T	G	GK %	F/G	Pts
1993	Gold Coast	9	1	0	—	0	4
1994	Gold Coast	18	6	0	—	0	24
1995	North Queensland	16	3	0	—	0	12
1996	North Queensland	3	2	0	—	0	8
1997	North Queensland	3	1	0	—	0	4
Career totals		49	13	0	—	0	52
