= Jamie Mathiou =

Ireland international rugby league footballer

Personal information
- Born: 4 September 1972 (age 54) Gold Coast, Queensland, Australia

Playing information
- Height: 185 cm (6 ft 1 in)
- Weight: 97 kg (15 st 4 lb)
- Position: Prop
Club
Years	Team	Pld	T	G	FG	P
1992–93	North Sydney Bears	4	1	0	0	4
1995–96	North Qld Cowboys	11	1	0	0	4
1997–01	Leeds Rhinos	136	4	0	0	16
	Total	151	6	0	0	24
Representative
Years	Team	Pld	T	G	FG	P
1999–00	Ireland	3	0	0	0	0

Jamie Mathiou (born 4 September 1972) is a former professional rugby league footballer who played in the 1990s and 2000s. An Ireland international prop, he played for the North Sydney Bears, North Queensland Cowboys and Leeds Rhinos.

== Background ==
Born on the Gold Coast, Queensland, Mathiou played his junior rugby league for the Cudgen Hornets and attended Kingscliff High School, where he represented the Australian Schoolboys in 1989.

== Playing career ==
In 1989, while playing for Cudgen, Mathiou represented the New South Wales under-17 team in their 16–8 win over Queensland under-17. In 1990, he joined the Gold Coast Seagulls, playing for their lower grade sides.

In 1992, Mathiou joined the North Sydney Bears. In Round 18 of the 1992 NSWRL season, he made his first-grade debut in the Bears' 12–26 loss to the St George Dragons. Over two seasons with North Sydney, Mathiou played four games.

In 1995, he joined the newly established North Queensland Cowboys. He played seven games for the club in their first season. In 1996, he played just four games before departing the club at the end of the season.

In 1997, Mathiou joined the Leeds Rhinos, where he would go on to play 136 games for the club, starting 100 from the bench. He became the longest-serving import for the club since the change of import rules in 1982. In 1998, he came off the bench in Leeds' 1998 Grand Final loss to the Wigan Warriors. In 1999, he came off the bench in Leeds' Challenge Cup win over the London Broncos.

In 2000, he represented Ireland at the 2000 Rugby League World Cup.

In 2002, after leaving Leeds, Mathiou returned to Australia, captaining the Ipswich Jets in the Queensland Cup for two seasons.

== Statistics ==
=== NSWRL/ARL ===
Season	Team	Matches	T	G	GK %	F/G	Pts
1992	North Sydney	2	0	0	–	0	0
1993	North Sydney	2	1	0	–	0	4
1995	North Queensland	7	1	0	–	0	4
1996	North Queensland	4	0	0	–	0	0
Career totals		15	2	0	–	0	8

=== Super League ===
Season	Team	Matches	T	G	GK %	F/G	Pts
1997	Leeds	28	0	0	—	0	0
1998	Leeds	26	0	0	—	0	0
1999	Leeds	26	1	0	—	0	4
2000	Leeds	30	2	0	—	0	8
2001	Leeds	26	1	0	—	0	4
Career totals		136	4	0	—	0	16

=== International ===
Season	Team	Matches	T	G	GK %	F/G	Pts
1999	Ireland	1	0	0	—	0	0
2000	Ireland	2	0	0	—	0	0
Career totals		3	0	0	—	0	0

== Post-playing career ==
After retiring, Mathiou spent time coaching the Cudgen Hornets and worked as a recruitment coordinator for the Sydney Roosters from 2005 to 2014. In 2015, he joined the Gold Coast Titans as the recruitment manager, spending only a year at the club. In 2016, he returned to the Roosters as a member of the recruitment team.
