= David Bouveng =

Australian rugby league footballer

Personal information
- Born: 6 February 1973 (age 52); Brisbane, Queensland, Australia

Playing information
- Position: Wing, Centre
Club
| Years | Team | Pld | T | G | FG | P |
|---|---|---|---|---|---|---|
| 1993–94 | Gold Coast Seagulls | 22 | 7 | 0 | 0 | 28 |
| 1995–96 | North Qld Cowboys | 21 | 10 | 0 | 0 | 40 |
| 1997–99 | Halifax Blue Sox | 53 | 20 | 0 | 0 | 80 |
| | Total | 96 | 37 | 0 | 0 | 148 |

David Bouveng (born 6 February 1973) is an Australian former professional rugby league footballer who played in the 1990s. A wing or centre, Bouveng played for the Gold Coast Seagulls, Halifax and was a foundation played for the North Queensland Cowboys.

== Background ==
Born in Brisbane, Bouveng was a Brisbane Brothers junior and attended Padua College, representing the school's rugby league team at the 1991 Confraternity Shield competition in Townsville. While playing for his school, he was signed by the Gold Coast Seagulls.

== Playing career ==
=== Gold Coast Seagulls ===
In Round 17 of the 1993 NSWRL season, Bouveng made his first grade debut for the Gold Coast in their 26–0 loss to the Illawarra Steelers. A week later, he scored a double in the Seagulls' 16–46 loss to the North Sydney Bears. He played the final six games of the 1993 season, starting three on the wing. In the 1994 season, Bouveng became a regular for the Gold Coast, playing 16 games (starting 14 of them) and scoring five tries.

=== North Queensland Cowboys ===
In 1995, Bouveng joined the newly established North Queensland Cowboys. He started on the wing in the club's first premiership game, a 16–32 loss to the Sydney Bulldogs. Bouveng was a standout in a poor season for the Cowboys, scoring nine tries and finishing as the club's equal top try scorer. In 1996, Bouveng played just five first grade games, scoring one try.

=== Halifax Blue Sox ===
In 1997, Bouveng joined Super League club Halifax. During his three years at the club he was a regular, starting most of his games at centre. In the 1998 season, he scored nine tries as Halifax finished the season in 3rd and made it to the elimination final.

=== Later career ===
In 2000, Bouveng returned to Australia, joining the Logan Scorpions in the Queensland Cup, scoring six tries.

== Statistics ==
=== NSWRL/ARL ===
| Season | Team | Matches | T | G | GK % | F/G | Pts |
|---|---|---|---|---|---|---|---|
| 1993 | Gold Coast | 6 | 2 | 0 | — | 0 | 8 |
| 1994 | Gold Coast | 16 | 5 | 0 | — | 0 | 20 |
| 1995 | North Queensland | 16 | 9 | 0 | — | 0 | 36 |
| 1996 | North Queensland | 5 | 1 | 0 | — | 0 | 4 |
| Career totals | | 43 | 17 | 0 | — | 0 | 68 |

=== Super League ===
| Season | Team | Matches | T | G | GK % | F/G | Pts |
|---|---|---|---|---|---|---|---|
| 1997 | Halifax | – | 7 | 0 | — | 0 | 28 |
| 1998 | Halifax | 27 | 10 | 0 | — | 0 | 40 |
| 1999 | Halifax | 26 | 3 | 0 | — | 0 | 12 |
| Career totals | | 53 | 20 | 0 | — | 0 | 80 |
