= Willie Morganson =

Australian rugby league footballer

Personal information
- Born: 11 September 1972 (age 54)
- Height: 180 cm (5 ft 11 in)
- Weight: 85 kg (13 st 5 lb)

Playing information
- Position: Centre
Club
Years	Team	Pld	T	G	FG	P
1991–93	Brisbane Broncos	18	4	0	0	16
1995–96	North Qld Cowboys	12	4	0	0	16
1997–98	Sheffield Eagles	14	6	3	0	30
	Total	44	14	3	0	62

Willie Morganson (born 11 September 1972) is an Australian former professional rugby league footballer who played in the 1990s. Primarily a centre, he played for the Brisbane Broncos and was a foundation player for the North Queensland Cowboys.

== Playing career ==
A North Queensland junior of Indigenous descent, Morganson represented the Queensland under-17 side in 1989 and the Queensland under-19 side in 1990.

In Round 3 of the 1991 NSWRL season, Morganson made his first grade debut for the Brisbane Broncos in a 26–12 win over the Canberra Raiders. He played eighteen first grade matches for the Broncos over three seasons. He scored his first try in Round 20 of the 1991 season, scoring a double in a 44–6 win over the North Sydney Bears. Over the next two seasons, Morganson played just 10 games.

In 1995, after not appearing in first grade for the Broncos in 1994, Morganson joined the newly established North Queensland Cowboys, starting at centre in their inaugural match against the Sydney Bulldogs. In two seasons with the Cowboys, he played 12 games, scoring four tries.

In 1996, Morganson moved to England, joining the Sheffield Eagles. He played two seasons with the club before returning to Australia.

In 2001, 2003, and 2005, he represented the Queensland Police in their annual clash with New South Wales.

== Statistics ==
=== NSWRL/ARL ===
Season	Team	Matches	T	G	GK %	F/G	Pts
1991	Brisbane	8	3	0	—	0	12
1992	Brisbane	5	1	0	—	0	4
19934	Brisbane	5	0	0	—	0	0
1995	North Queensland	8	2	0	0.0	0	8
1996	North Queensland	4	2	0	—	0	8
Career totals		30	8	0	0.0	0	32

=== Super League ===
Season	Team	Matches	T	G	GK %	F/G	Pts
1997	Sheffield	–	4	0	—	0	16
1998	Sheffield	14	2	3	—	0	14
Career totals		14	6	3	–	0	28
