= Paul Bowman (rugby league) =

Australian rugby league footballer (born 1976)

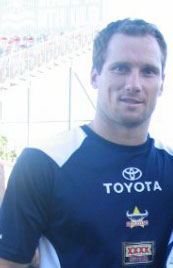

Personal information
- Full name: Paul Jenkins Bowman
- Born: 24 January 1976 (age 50) Newcastle, New South Wales, Australia

Playing information
- Height: 185 cm (6 ft 1 in)
- Weight: 98 kg (15 st 6 lb)
- Position: Centre, Lock
Club
Years	Team	Pld	T	G	FG	P
1995–07	North Qld Cowboys	203	62	1	0	250
Representative
Years	Team	Pld	T	G	FG	P
2000–05	Queensland	12	2	0	0	8

Paul Bowman (born 24 January 1976) is an Australian former professional rugby league footballer who played in the 1990s and 2000s. A Queensland State of Origin representative centre, he played his entire club career for the North Queensland Cowboys in the National Rugby League (NRL), whom he also captained.

Throughout his 13-year career, he was considered one of the best defensive centres in the NRL. He is currently the Head of Performance at the Cowboys.

== Background ==
Born in Newcastle, New South Wales while his father worked as a veterinarian in the city, Bowman and his family moved to Proserpine, Queensland when he was one. He played his junior rugby league for the Proserpine Brahmans and later attended St. Brendan's College, Yeppoon.

== Playing career ==
In 1994, Bowman signed with the newly established North Queensland Cowboys after being spotted by head coach Grant Bell playing for Proserpine. In Round 16 of the 1995 ARL season, he made his first grade debut for the Cowboys, starting at centre in their 16–30 loss to the South Sydney Rabbitohs. He scored his first try for the club three weeks later in a 6–22 loss to the South Queensland Crushers. He finished his rookie season with one try in seven games. Bowman played just six games in 1996, starting each at centre and scoring two tries.

In 1997, he played 10 games and scored two tries and in 1998, played just the first six games before missing the rest of the season through injury. In 1999, Bowman played 16 games for the club, the majority of those at lock, and was named the club's Player of the Year.

In 2000, Bowman had a breakout season in which he started 20 games at centre, scoring eight tries, and was named the Cowboys' Player of the Year, an award he shared with Julian O'Neill. In May, he made his State of Origin debut for Queensland, becoming the club's second Queensland representative and their first homegrown Queensland player.

In 2001, he became the captain of the Cowboys, a role he would hold until 2004. He played 25 games that season, scoring 12 tries, and once again represented Queensland. In Game 3 of the 2001 State of Origin series, he scored two tries in Queensland's series-deciding win over New South Wales. In 2002, Bowman missed the start of the season through injury, returning in Round 10 to play 14 games and score 10 tries. In Round 21, he played his 100th game for the club, becoming the second player to do so.

In 2003, he played 16 games, scoring three tries. In Game 1 of the 2003 State of Origin series, one minute after coming off the bench, he suffered medial ligament and cartilage damage to his left knee in a tackle that would see him sidelined for four weeks. Remarkably, despite being unable to walk, he stayed on the field and managed to make several tackles before getting a chance to be taken off.

In 2004, Bowman began the season as the Cowboys' captain before being replaced by new recruit Travis Norton in Round 7. He played 21 games that season and played in the finals for the first time as the Cowboys finished 7th on the ladder, their highest ever finish at the time. He started two games at centre for Queensland in the 2004 State of Origin series.

In 2005, he played 25 games, scoring nine tries, and started at centre for Queensland in all three games of the 2005 State of Origin series. On 2 October 2005, he started at centre in the Cowboys' 2005 NRL Grand Final loss to the Wests Tigers. Following the season, he won the club's Players' Player award. In 2006, he played just 16 games, scoring three tries, in a season plagued by a neck injury.

On 3 June 2007, Bowman announced that he would retire at the end of the 2007 NRL season. On 30 August, the club announced that their Player of the Year award would be renamed the Paul Bowman Medal in his honour. In Round 25, he became the first player to play 200 games for the Cowboys in their 38–32 win over the Canterbury Bulldogs.

He played his final home game for the club in a 49–12 semi final win over the Warriors, kicking the first goal of his career. He ended his first grade career as the last Cowboys foundation player to retire, playing 203 games for the club over 13 seasons.

== Achievements and accolades ==
=== Individual ===
- North Queensland Cowboys Player of the Year: 1999, 2000
- North Queensland Cowboys Players' Player: 2005

== Statistics ==
=== NRL ===
Statistics are correct to the end of the 2007 season

Season	Team	Matches	T	G	GK %	F/G	Pts
1995	North Queensland	7	1	0	—	0	4
1996	North Queensland	6	2	0	—	0	8
1997	North Queensland	10	2	0	—	0	8
1998	North Queensland	6	1	0	—	0	4
1999	North Queensland	16	2	0	—	0	8
2000	North Queensland	20	8	0	—	0	32
2001	North Queensland	25	12	0	—	0	48
2002	North Queensland	14	10	0	—	0	40
2003	North Queensland	16	3	0	—	0	12
2004	North Queensland	21	4	0	—	0	16
2005	North Queensland	25	9	0	—	0	36
2006	North Queensland	16	3	0	—	0	12
2007	North Queensland	21	5	1	100%	0	22
Career totals		203	62	1	100%	0	250

=== State of Origin ===
†	Denotes seasons in which Bowman won a State of Origin Series

Season	Team	Matches	T	G	GK %	F/G	Pts
2000	Queensland	3	0	0	—	0	0
2001†	Queensland	3	2	0	—	0	8
2003	Queensland	1	0	0	—	0	0
2004	Queensland	2	0	0	—	0	0
2005	Queensland	3	0	0	—	0	0
Career totals		12	2	0	—	0	8

== Post-playing career ==
In 2008, Bowman began a part-time assistant coaching role with the Cowboys under-20 side. Later that season, he became a full-time assistant coach with the club's NRL squad, signing until the end of the 2010 season. In 2011, he became the club's High Performance Manager, a role he held until the end of the 2018 season.

On 17 May 2015, Bowman was named at centre in the Cowboys 20-year team and, alongside Matt Sing, was an inaugural inductee into the Cowboys' Hall of Fame.

On 9 October 2018, he was named the Cowboys' Head of Sports Science. On 30 October 2020, he became the club's Head of Performance.
