= 1997 Super League season =

1997 Super League season or 1997 Super League premiership may refer to the following rugby league football competitions:

- 1997 Super League (UK) season, in Europe
- 1997 Super League (Australia) season
