= Ian Russell (rugby league) =

Australian rugby league footballer

Personal information
- Full name: Ian Russell
- Born: 10 August 1965 (age 59); Taree, Australia

Playing information
- Height: 181 cm (5 ft 11 in)
- Weight: 96 kg (15 st 2 lb)
- Position: Lock, Second-row
Club
Years	Team	Pld	T	G	FG	P
1986–94	Illawarra Steelers	115	14	0	2	58
1990–91	Sheffield Eagles		3	0	0	12
1995–96	North Qld Cowboys	12	0	0	0	0
1996	Paris Saint-Germain	3	0	0	0	0
1997	Oldham Bears	6	1	0	0	4
	Total	136	18	0	2	74
Representative
Years	Team	Pld	T	G	FG	P
1991	Country Origin	1	0	0	0	0

Ian Russell (born 10 August 1965) is an Australian former professional rugby league footballer who played in the 1980s and 1990s. Primarily a lock, he played for the Illawarra Steelers and North Queensland Cowboys in Australia, and for the Sheffield Eagles, Paris Saint-Germain and Oldham Bears in Europe.

== Playing career ==
A Mittagong Lions junior of Indigenous descent, Russell won an under-18 Grand Final with club in 1983 and played A Grade for them in 1984 before joining the Illawarra Steelers.

=== Illawarra Steelers ===
In Round 6 of the 1986 NSWRL season, Russell made his first grade debut for Illawarra in a 22–8 win over the St George Dragons. In 1987, after just one game for the Steelers, Russell was released from the club when he returned to Mittagong.

In 1988, Russell was invited back to the club and, although he could not force his way into their top side at first, he became a key player for the team. In 1990, he was named the Steelers' Player of the Year, was named in the Australian train-on squad and finished fourth in Rothmans Medal voting. In 1991, he once again won the Steelers' Player of the Year award and represented NSW Country Origin, starting at lock in their 12–22 loss to City. In the Australian summer of 1990–91, Russell spent time with the Sheffield Eagles in the English Championship, scoring three tries.

In 1992, a hamstring injury saw him miss the finals series, a major blow to the Steelers, Despite the injury, he won the Dally M Lock of the Year award. Over the next two seasons, injuries restricted him to just 18 games. He ended his time with Illawarra having played 115 games, finishing as the club's 10th most capped player.

=== North Queensland Cowboys ===
In 1995, Russell joined the newly established North Queensland Cowboys. He started at lock in their inaugural game against the Sydney Bulldogs, but played just 11 games in the club's first season. In 1996, Russell played just one game for the club before being sacked for disciplinary reasons.

=== Paris Saint-Germain ===
In 1996, after departing the Cowboys, Russell joined Paris Saint-Germain for their first season in the Super League, playing three games for the club.

=== Oldham Bears ===
In 1997, Russell joined the Oldham Bears, playing six games for the club.

== Achievements and accolades ==
=== Individual ===
- Dally M Lock of the Year: 1992
- Illawarra Steelers Player of the Year: 1990, 1991
- Illawarra Steelers 25th Anniversary Team of Steel

== Statistics ==
=== NSWRL/ARL ===
Season	Team	Matches	T	G	GK %	F/G	Pts
1986	Illawarra	3	0	0	—	0	0
1987	Illawarra	1	0	0	—	0	0
1988	Illawarra	16	7	0	—	1	29
1989	Illawarra	18	0	0	—	0	0
1990	Illawarra	21	4	0	—	0	16
1991	Illawarra	22	2	0	—	0	8
1992	Illawarra	17	0	0	—	1	1
1993	Illawarra	8	0	0	—	0	8
1994	Illawarra	9	1	0	—	0	4
1995	North Queensland	11	0	0	—	0	0
1996	North Queensland	1	0	0	—	0	0
Career totals		127	14	0	—	2	58

=== Championship/Super League ===
Season	Team	Matches	T	G	GK %	F/G	Pts
1990–91	Sheffield	–	3	0	—	0	12
1996	Paris Saint-Germain	3	0	0	—	0	0
1997	Oldham	6	1	0	—	0	4
Career totals		9	4	0	—	0	16

== Post-playing career ==
In 2006, Russell was named at lock in the Illawarra Steelers 25th Anniversary Team of Steel.

== Personal life ==
Russell's son, Tate, is a professional soccer player and currently plays for the Western United in the A-League.
