= Andrew Meads =

Australian rugby league footballer

Personal information
- Full name: Andrew Meads
- Born: 2 February 1977 (age 49) Ayr, Queensland

Playing information
- Position: Lock
Club
Years	Team	Pld	T	G	FG	P
1995	North Qld Cowboys	1	0	0	0	0
1998–99	Balmain Tigers	12	1	0	0	0
2002–03	Parramatta Eels	8	0	0	0	0
	Total	21	1	0	0	0

Andrew Meads (born 2 February 1977) is an Australian former professional rugby league footballer who played in the 1990s and 2000s. Primarily a lock, he was a foundation player for the North Queensland Cowboys and also had stints with the Balmain Tigers and Parramatta Eels.

== Background ==
A Townsville Brothers junior, Meads attended Kirwan State High School.

== Playing career ==
In 1994, Meads represented the Queensland under-17 side, starting at lock in their 14–28 loss to New South Wales. In 1995, he signed with the newly established North Queensland Cowboys, one of two 18-year-olds in the squad, alongside Aaron Ketchell.

In Round 22 of the 1995 ARL season, Meads made his first grade debut for the Cowboys in a 4–66 loss to the Sydney Bulldogs, his lone appearance for the club in first grade.

In 1997, he joined the Balmain Tigers and was a member of their Jersey Flegg Cup winning side. He made his first grade debut for the club in 1998, playing 12 games for them over two seasons, including the club's last ever game as a first grade side, a 14–42 loss to the Canberra Raiders. After Balmain merged with the Western Suburbs Magpies, Meads was not offered a contract to play with the Wests Tigers.

In 2002, after a stint with the St George Illawarra Dragons in which he didn't play first grade, Meads moved to the Parramatta Eels and played eight games for them over two seasons.

== Statistics ==
=== ARL/NRL ===
Season	Team	Matches	T	G	GK %	F/G	Pts
1995	North Queensland	1	0	0	—	0	0
1998	Balmain	8	1	0	—	0	0
1999	Balmain	4	0	0	—	0	0
2002	Parramatta	5	0	0	—	0	0
2003	Parramatta	3	0	0	—	0	0
Career totals		21	1	0	—	0	4

== Post-playing career ==
Following his retirement, Meads returned to Townsville and spent time as the North Queensland Cowboys' wrestling coach.
