= Faron Anderson =

Australian rugby league footballer (born 1975)

Personal information
- Born: 14 February 1975 (age 50)

Playing information
- Position: Wing
Club
Years	Team	Pld	T	G	FG	P
1995–96	North Qld Cowboys	3	0	0	0	0

Faron Anderson (born 14 February 1975) is an Australian former professional rugby league footballer who played in the 1990s. Primarily a winger, he was a foundation player for the North Queensland Cowboys.

== Playing career ==
In Round 15 of the 1995 ARL season, Anderson made his first grade debut in the Cowboys' first ever home win, a 31–12 victory over the Western Suburbs Magpies. He would play just three games over two seasons for the club.

In 1998, Anderson joined the Burleigh Bears in the Queensland Cup. In 1999, he started on the wing in their Grand Final win over the Redcliffe Dolphins.

In 2001, Anderson moved to the Ipswich Jets and started at centre in their 2002 Grand Final loss to the Redcliffe Dolphins. In 2003, he returned to Burleigh, coming off the bench in their Grand Final loss to Redcliffe.

== Statistics ==
=== ARL ===
Season	Team	Matches	T	G	GK %	F/G	Pts
1995	North Queensland	2	0	0	—	0	0
1996	North Queensland	1	0	0	—	0	0
Career totals		3	0	0	—	0	0
