= Leigh Groves =

Australian rugby league footballer

Personal information
- Born: 11 December 1973 (age 51); Cairns, Queensland, Australia
- Height: 188 cm (6 ft 2 in)
- Weight: 100 kg (15 st 10 lb)

Playing information
- Position: Prop, Second-row
Club
Years	Team	Pld	T	G	FG	P
1993–94	Gold Coast Seagulls	5	1	0	0	4
1995–96	North Qld Cowboys	19	6	0	0	24
	Total	24	7	0	0	28

Leigh Groves (born 11 December 1973) is an Australian former professional rugby league footballer who played in the 1990s. A lock or second-rower, Groves played for the Gold Coast Seagulls and North Queensland Cowboys.

== Playing career ==
A Cairns junior, Groves made his first grade debut for the Gold Coast Seagulls in Round 13 of the 1993 NSWRL season. He spent two seasons on the Gold Coast, playing five games.

In 1995, Groves returned north to join the newly established North Queensland Cowboys, coming off the bench in their inaugural game against the Sydney Bulldogs. During his two seasons at the club he played 19 games, scoring one of 6 tries for North Queensland Cowboys.

Later in his career, Groves played for the Redcliffe Dolphins and Ipswich Jets in the Queensland Cup.

== Statistics ==
=== NSWRL/ARL ===
Season	Team	Matches	T	G	GK %	F/G	Pts
1993	Gold Coast	2	0	0	–	0	0
1994	Gold Coast	3	1	0	–	0	0
1995	North Queensland	17	6	0	–	0	24
1996	North Queensland	2	0	0	–	0	0
Career totals		24	1	0	–	0	4
