= Noel Solomon =

Australian rugby league footballer

Personal information
- Born: 21 December 1971 [Brisbane, Queensland, Australia
- Died: 13 February 2025 (aged 53)

Playing information
- Height: 180 cm (5 ft 11 in)
- Weight: 92 kg (14 st 7 lb)
- Position: Five-eighth, Halfback
Club
Years	Team	Pld	T	G	FG	P
1992–94	North Sydney Bears	29	5	0	0	20
1995	North Qld Cowboys	6	0	0	0	0
	Total	35	5	0	0	20
- Source: As of 24 January 2019

Noel Solomon (21 December 1971 – 13 February 2025) was an Australian former professional rugby league footballer who played in the 1990s. Primarily a half, he played for the North Sydney Bears and North Queensland Cowboys.

== Playing career ==
A Townsville junior of Torres Strait Islander descent, Solomon joined the North Sydney Bears in 1991, winning two Reserve Grade Grand Finals with the club in 1991 and 1992.

He made his first grade debut in Round 15 of the 1992 NSWRL season. In 1993, he became a regular for the Bears, playing 21 of the club's 22 games, starting 17 of them at halfback. In 1994, after the Bears recruited Western Suburbs Magpies halfback Jason Taylor, Solomon played just five games for North Sydney, which included coming off the bench in a preliminary final loss to the Canberra Raiders.

In 1995, Solomon returned to Townsville, joining the newly established North Queensland Cowboys. He came off the bench in the club's inaugural game against the Sydney Bulldogs. Solomon played just six games for the Cowboys before being sacked in May for disciplinary breaches. In 1996, he played for the Mackay Sea Eagles in the Queensland Cup.

== Personal life ==
Solomon, aged 53, died on 13 February 2025.

== Statistics ==
=== NSWRL/ARL ===
Season	Team	Matches	T	G	GK %	F/G	Pts
1992	North Sydney	3	1	0	–	0	4
1993	North Sydney	21	4	0	–	0	16
1994	North Sydney	5	0	0	–	0	0
1995	North Queensland	6	0	0	–	0	0
Career totals		35	5	0	–	0	20
