= Reggie Cressbrook =

Australian rugby league footballer

Personal information
- Born: 23 October 1974 (age 52) Woorabinda, Queensland, Australia

Playing information
- Position: Fullback
Club
Years	Team	Pld	T	G	FG	P
1995–97	North Qld Cowboys	34	5	17	0	54

Reggie Cressbrook (born 23 October 1974) is an Australian former professional rugby league footballer who played in the 1990s. Primarily a fullback, he was a foundation player for the North Queensland Cowboys

== Playing career ==
Born and raised in Woorabinda, Queensland, Cressbrook is the first (and so far only) person from the small Aboriginal community to play first grade rugby league.

In Round 15 of the 1995 ARL season, he made his first grade debut in the Cowboys' first ever home win, a 31-12 victory over the Western Suburbs Magpies. He finished his rookie season with 8 appearances and five goals. In 1996, he played 15 games for the Cowboys, scoring two tries and kicking 12 goals for 32 points, finishing as the club's second highest point scorer. In 1997, his final season with the club, he played 11 games, scoring three tries.

Following his departure from the Cowboys, Cressbrook played for the Townsville Stingers, Burleigh Bears and Ipswich Jets in the Queensland Cup, playing a total of 143 games between 1998 and 2006, scoring 89 tries and kicking 366 goals for 1,089 points. He played in five Grand Finals, winning two with Burleigh in 1999 and 2004. As of 2020, he currently holds Burleigh's most points (964) and most tries (69) records. In 2015, he was named at centre in the QRL's Queensland Cup 20th Anniversary Team.

== Achievements and accolades ==
=== Individual ===
- Queensland Cup 20th Anniversary Team: 2015

== Statistics ==
=== ARL/SL ===
Season	Team	Matches	T	G	GK %	F/G	Pts
1995	North Queensland	8	0	5	62.5	0	10
1996	North Queensland	15	2	12	60.0	0	32
1997	North Queensland	11	3	0	—	0	12
Career totals		34	5	17	60.7	0	54

== Post-playing career ==
In 2017, Cressbrook returned to Woorabinda to coach the Woorabinda Warriors A-Grade side.
