= Craig Menkins =

Australian rugby league footballer

Personal information
- Born: 6 July 1970; Maitland, New South Wales, Australia
- Died: 5 July 2023 (aged 52)

Playing information
- Position: Prop, Hooker
Club
Years	Team	Pld	T	G	FG	P
1993	Western Suburbs	5	0	0	0	0
1995	North Qld Cowboys	4	0	0	0	0
1997	Paris Saint-Germain
	Total	9	0	0	0	0

Craig Menkins (6 July 1970 – 5 July 2023) was an Australian professional rugby league footballer who played in the 1990s. Primarily a prop, Menkins was a foundation player for the North Queensland Cowboys.

== Playing career ==
Originally from Maitland, New South Wales, Menkins made his first grade debut for the Western Suburbs Magpies in Round 13 of the 1993 NSWRL season. He would play five games in his lone season at the club.

He then played for Mackay in the Foley Shield before joining the North Queensland Cowboys in 1995, playing four games in the club's inaugural season. In Round 8 of the 1995 season, he came off the bench in the club's first win against the Western Suburbs Magpies.

In 1997, he played for Paris Saint-Germain in the Super League II season.

== Post-playing career ==
Following his retirement, Menkins coached the Mornabah Miners and Wests Tigers Mackay.

His death was announced on 7 Jul 2023 after a long illness
