= Ben Spina =

Australian rugby league footballer

Personal information
- Born: 26 April 1988 (age 38) Sydney, New South Wales, Australia
- Height: 186 cm (6 ft 1 in)
- Weight: 100 kg (15 st 10 lb)

Playing information
- Position: Second-row, Lock
Club
| Years | Team | Pld | T | G | FG | P |
|---|---|---|---|---|---|---|
| 2014–17 | North Qld Cowboys | 16 | 3 | 0 | 0 | 12 |
Representative
| Years | Team | Pld | T | G | FG | P |
| 2013–15 | Queensland Residents | 2 | 0 | 0 | 0 | 0 |
- Source: As of 6 January 2024
- Father: Laurie Spina
- Relatives: Ashley Spina (sister)

Ben Spina (/spiːnə/ SPEE-na) (born 26 April 1988) is an Australian professional rugby league footballer who previously played for the North Queensland Cowboys in the National Rugby League. He plays at second-row and lock.

== Background ==
Born in Sydney while his father, Laurie, was playing for Eastern Suburbs, Spina grew up in Ingham, Queensland and played his junior football for the Herbert River Crushers before being signed by the North Queensland Cowboys. In 2008, Spina played for the Cowboys' NYC team.

In 2009, Spina joined the Northern Pride RLFC in the Queensland Cup. In 2011, Spina signed a 3-year contract with the North Queensland Cowboys starting in 2012. In 2012 and 2013, Spina won the Northern Pride RLFC Player of the Year awards. In 2013, Spina played for the Queensland Residents. In 2014, Spina was again selected for the Queensland Residents, but had to withdraw due to being called up for his NRL debut.

== Playing career ==
=== 2014 ===
In Round 17 of the 2014 NRL season, Spina made his NRL debut for North Queensland against St. George Illawarra.

Spina was a member of the Northern Pride's Grand Final winning Queensland Cup and 2014 NRL State Championship winning sides.

On 9 October 2014, Spina re-signed with the North Queensland club on a one-year contract.

=== 2015 ===
On 10 June 2015, Spina re-signed with North Queensland on a two-year contract.

=== 2016 ===
On 5 May, Spina was named on the interchange bench in QRL journalist Tony Webeck's Queensland Residents team of the past 10 years. He played two games off the bench for the North Queensland club in 2016.

=== 2017 ===
Spina played eight games for North Queensland in 2017, scoring two tries, before suffering a season-ending bicep injury.

=== 2018 ===
After not having his contract renewed by North Queensland, Spina joined the Herbert River Crushers in the Townsville & District Rugby League A Grade competition.

== Personal life ==
Spina is the son of former North Queensland Cowboys player and inaugural captain, Laurie Spina, becoming the first father-son duo to play for the Cowboys, and the brother of Brisbane Roar FC W-League player Ashley Spina.

Spina is an Australian Apprenticeships Ambassador for the Australian Government.

== Statistics ==
=== NRL ===
Statistics are correct to the end of the 2017 season

| Season | Team | Matches | T | G | GK % | F/G | Pts |
|---|---|---|---|---|---|---|---|
| 2014 | North Queensland | 1 | 0 | 0 | — | 0 | 0 |
| 2015 | North Queensland | 5 | 1 | 0 | — | 0 | 4 |
| 2016 | North Queensland | 2 | 0 | 0 | — | 0 | 0 |
| 2017 | North Queensland | 8 | 2 | 0 | — | 0 | 8 |
| Career totals | | 16 | 3 | 0 | — | 0 | 12 |
