= Jason Erba =

Australian rugby league footballer

Personal information
- Born: 1 January 1972 (age 54) Ingham, Queensland, Australia

Playing information
- Position: Hooker
Club
Years	Team	Pld	T	G	FG	P
1992	Brisbane Broncos	1	0	0	0	0
1995	North Qld Cowboys	5	0	0	0	0
1997	Sheffield Eagles	20	0	0	0	0
	Total	26	0	0	0	0

Jason Erba (born 1 January 1972) is an Australian former professional rugby league footballer who played in the 1990s. Primarily a hooker, Erba was a foundation player for the North Queensland Cowboys and had stints with the Brisbane Broncos and Sheffield Eagles.

== Playing career ==
Originally from Ingham, Erba represented the Queensland under-17 side in 1989 and the Queensland under-19 side in 1990 and 1991.

After playing for Herbert River in the Foley Shield, Erba made his first grade debut for the Brisbane Broncos in Round 20 of the 1992 NSWRL season. After leaving the Broncos, Erba spent time with the Gold Coast Seagulls but did not play first grade for the club.

In 1995, he played for the newly established North Queensland Cowboys, playing five games for them in their inaugural season. In 1997, Erba played for the Sheffield Eagles in the Super League.

== Post-playing career ==
Following his retirement, Erba returned to Ingham to coach the Herbert River Crushers A-Grade side.
