= Steven Holmes (rugby league) =

Australian rugby league footballer

Personal information
- Born: 10 August 1971 (age 53); Townsville, Queensland, Australia

Playing information
- Position: Fullback
Club
Years	Team	Pld	T	G	FG	P
1995	North Qld Cowboys	5	0	2	0	4
1997	Hull Sharks	30	12	19	0	86
	Total	35	12	21	0	90

Steven Holmes (born 10 August 1971) is an Australian former professional rugby league footballer who played in the 1990s. Primarily a fullback, Holmes was a foundation player for the North Queensland Cowboys.

== Playing career ==
After playing for Townsville in the Foley Shield, Holmes joined the North Queensland Cowboys in 1995 for their inaugural season. Holmes made his first grade debut in Round 4 and would play five games for the season, kicking two goals. In Round 8, Holmes started at fullback in the club's first victory, a 14–10 win over the Illawarra Steelers.

In 1997, Holmes played in England for Hull Sharks, helping the team win promotion to the Super League.
