= Craig Teitzel =

Australian rugby league footballer

Personal information
- Born: 26 December 1963 (age 61); Tully, Queensland, Australia

Playing information
- Height: 189 cm (6 ft 2 in)
- Weight: 110 kg (17 st 5 lb)
- Position: Prop, Second-row
Club
Years	Team	Pld	T	G	FG	P
1988–89	Western Suburbs	13	2	0	0	8
1990–93	Illawarra Steelers	50	3	0	0	12
1993–94	Warrington Wolves	27	4	0	0	16
1995	North Qld Cowboys	12	0	0	0	0
	Total	102	9	0	0	36
- Relatives: Romy Teitzel (daughter)

Craig Teitzel (born 26 December 1963) is an Australian former professional rugby league footballer who played in the 1980s and 1990s. Primarily a prop, he played for the Western Suburbs Magpies, Illawarra Steelers, Warrington Wolves and was a foundation player for the North Queensland Cowboys.

== Playing career ==
Originally from Tully, Queensland, Teitzel made his first grade debut for the Western Suburbs Magpies in Round 1 of the 1988 NSWRL season. After two seasons with the club, Teitzel moved to the Illawarra Steelers, where he played 50 games over four seasons.

At the end of the 1993 season, Teitzel joined the Warrington Wolves for the 1993-94 RFL Championship season. After one season with the club, Teitzel returned to Australia in 1994 and was set to retire before joining the North Queensland Cowboys for the 1995 ARL season. He played 12 games for the club in their inaugural season before retiring.

== Statistics ==
=== NSWRL/ARL ===
Season	Team	Matches	T	G	GK %	F/G	Pts
1988	Western Suburbs	2	1	0	—	0	4
1989	Western Suburbs	11	1	0	—	0	4
1990	Illawarra	15	2	0	—	0	8
1991	Illawarra	18	0	0	—	0	0
1992	Illawarra	7	0	0	—	0	0
1993	Illawarra	10	1	0	—	0	4
1995	North Queensland	12	0	0	—	0	0
Career totals		75	5	0	—	0	20

=== Championship ===
Season	Team	Matches	T	G	GK %	F/G	Pts
1993-94	Warrington	27	4	0	—	0	16
Career totals		27	4	0	—	0	16
