= Dean Schifilliti =

Australian rugby league footballer

Personal information
- Born: 30 March 1968 (age 57); Ingham, Queensland, Australia
- Height: 177 cm (5 ft 10 in)
- Weight: 90 kg (14 st 2 lb)

Playing information
- Position: Hooker
Club
Years	Team	Pld	T	G	FG	P
1989–93	Illawarra Steelers	102	16	0	0	64
1994	South Sydney	6	0	0	0	0
1995–96	North Qld Cowboys	11	0	0	0	0
1997–98	Adelaide Rams	35	6	0	0	24
1999–00	Parramatta Eels	30	1	0	0	4
	Total	184	23	0	0	92

Dean Schifilliti (/skɪfɪlɪti/ SKIFF-il-ITTY) (born 30 March 1968) is an Australian former professional rugby league footballer who played in the 1980s, 1990s and 2000s. Primarily a hooker, Schifilliti played for the Illawarra Steelers, South Sydney Rabbitohs, North Queensland Cowboys, Adelaide Rams and Parramatta Eels throughout his career.

== Background ==
Born and raised in Ingham, Queensland, Schifilliti is of Italian descent and played his junior rugby league for Herbert River. While playing for Herbert River's Foley Shield side, he was signed by the Illawarra Steelers.

== Playing career ==
=== Illawarra Steelers ===
In Round 1 of the 1989 NSWRL season, Schifilliti made his first grade debut in Illawarra's 18–22 loss to the St George Dragons, scoring two tries. In his rookie season for the Steelers, he played 21 games, starting 14 at hooker, scoring five tries. In 1990, he started all 22 of Illawarra's games at hooker, scoring six tries, and in 1991, took over as captain of the club. In 1992, he captained the Steelers' to their first finals appearances, with the club coming within one game of the Grand Final.

In 1993, Schifilliti signed with the North Queensland Cowboys, who were set to enter the competition in 1995, becoming the club's first major signing. He played 16 games for the Steelers that year but after signing with the Cowboys, would lose the captaincy and finish the season in reserve grade.

=== South Sydney Rabbitohs ===
In 1994, Schifilliti joined the South Sydney Rabbitohs in the interim and achieved success early, captaining the side in their pre-season Tooheys Challenge Cup final win over the Brisbane Broncos. Schifilliti played just six games for the Rabbitohs after suffering a knee injury.

=== North Queensland Cowboys ===
In 1995, Schifilliti recovered from his knee injury, passing a late fitness test to start at hooker in the Cowboys inaugural game against the Sydney Bulldogs. Unfortunately, 24 minutes into the game, he re-injured his knee and would be ruled out for the rest of the 1995 season. In January 1996, Schifilliti represented Italy at the Super League World Nines in Suva, Fiji. Later that year, he returned to first grade for the Cowboys, playing 10 games, mostly at lock.

=== Adelaide Rams ===
In 1997, Schifilliti joined the Adelaide Rams after being granted a release by the Cowboys. After two injury riddled seasons, he played two full seasons with the Rams, playing 35 games for the club. In 1998, he played 21 games, playing mostly at lock, and scoring a try in the club's final game, a 20–34 loss to the Newcastle Knights.

=== Parramatta Eels ===
In 1999, Schifilliti's return to form saw him sign with the Parramatta Eels after the Rams had folded. He played 20 games for the Eels that season, starting all at hooker, including their two finals games. In 2000, he played 10 games before retiring at the end of the season.

== Achievements and accolades ==
=== Individual ===
- Illawarra Steelers 25th Anniversary Team of Steel

== Statistics ==
=== NSWRL/ARL/Super League/NRL ===
Season	Team	Matches	T	G	GK %	F/G	Pts
1989	Illawarra	21	5	0	0	0	20
1990	Illawarra	22	5	0	0	0	20
1991	Illawarra	20	4	0	0	0	16
1992	Illawarra	23	1	0	0	0	4
1993	Illawarra	16	1	0	0	0	4
1994	South Sydney	6	0	0	0	0	0
1995	North Queensland	1	0	0	0	0	0
1996	North Queensland	10	0	0	0	0	0
1997	Adelaide	14	0	0	0	0	0
1998	Adelaide	21	6	0	0	0	24
1999	Parramatta	20	1	0	0	0	4
2000	Parramatta	10	0	0	0	0	0
Career totals		184	23	0	0	0	92

== Post-playing career ==
In 2006, Schifilliti was named at lock in the Illawarra Steelers 25th Anniversary Team of Steel. Since 2018, the Dean Schifilliti Shield has been played in Ingham, featuring under-8's sides from around north Queensland.
