= Laurie Spina =

Australian rugby league footballer

Personal information
- Full name: Laurie Joseph Spina
- Born: 21 May 1963 (age 61); Ingham, Queensland, Australia

Playing information
- Position: Halfback, Five-eighth
Club
Years	Team	Pld	T	G	FG	P
1983–84	North Sydney Bears	37	11	0	0	44
1985–89	Eastern Suburbs	99	19	0	0	76
1990	Cronulla Sharks	22	5	0	0	20
1995	North Qld Cowboys	13	1	0	0	4
	Total	171	36	0	0	144
- Relatives: Ben Spina (son); Ashley Spina (daughter)

Laurie Joseph Spina (/spiːnə/ SPEE-na) (born 21 May 1963) is an Australian former professional rugby league footballer and rugby league commentator. In 1995, Spina was the inaugural captain of the North Queensland Cowboys.

== Background ==
Born in Ingham, Queensland, Spina was a stand-out player during his junior years in the Herbert River local competition. His consistency earned him his first Foley Shield match against previous year title holders, Mount Isa, in which he won Man of the match. In 1982, he was a member of Herbert River's undefeated team that drew with Townsville in the Foley Shield final.

== Playing career ==
=== North Sydney Bears ===
In 1983, Spina moved to Sydney, where he joined the North Sydney Bears in the New South Wales Rugby League premiership. He made his first grade debut as a 19-year-old, coming off the bench in the Bears' 22–20 win over the Newtown Jets. The following week, he started at halfback and scored twice in the Bears' loss to Canberra. He would spend the rest of the season as North Sydney's starting halfback. During his two seasons with the Bears, he played 37 games and scored 11 tries.

=== Eastern Suburbs Roosters ===
In 1985, he joined the Eastern Suburbs Roosters and would spend five seasons with the club. In his first season, he started 23 of his 24 games at halfback. He was the starting halfback throughout the majority of his stint with the Roosters, starting 89 of his 99 games in the position.

In 1987, many judges thought Spina would represent Queensland in the 1987 State of Origin series after playing in a State of Origin trial played at Lang Park between a Queensland Residents team and a New South Wales-based Residents team. Playing for the New South Wales-based side, Spina played alongside Sam Backo, another Ingham product. He was widely thought to have had a better game than his opposite halfback, Ipswich's Allan Langer. Queensland captain Wally Lewis later said both he and coach Wayne Bennett had supported Spina, but he was sensationally left out of the Maroons' team for the series and never went on to play a game for them.

=== Cronulla-Sutherland Sharks ===
Spina moved to the Cronulla-Sutherland Sharks for the 1990 season. During his lone season at the Cronulla club, Spina played 22 games, starting at halfback in all of them, and scored five tries. At the end of the season, aged just 27, Spina returned to north Queensland to play for his former club, Herbert River.

=== North Queensland Cowboys ===
In 1995, at age 31, Spina returned to first grade, being named the inaugural captain of the newly introduced North Queensland Cowboys in the Australian Rugby League competition. On 11 March 1995, he led the side out for their first ever game, a 32–16 loss at home to the Canterbury-Bankstown Bulldogs. He captained the side in their first ever win, a 14–10 victory over the Illawarra Steelers in Wollongong. Spina retired at the end of the 1995 season, playing 13 games and scoring one try for North Queensland.

== Statistics ==
=== NSWRL/ARL ===
Season	Team	Matches	T	G	GK %	F/G	Pts
1983	North Sydney	24	9	0	—	0	36
1984	North Sydney	13	2	0	—	0	8
1985	Eastern Suburbs	24	5	0	—	0	20
1986	Eastern Suburbs	16	1	0	—	0	4
1987	Eastern Suburbs	26	4	0	—	0	16
1988	Eastern Suburbs	13	6	0	—	0	24
1989	Eastern Suburbs	20	3	0	—	0	12
1990	Cronulla-Sutherland	22	5	0	—	0	20
1995	North Queensland	13	1	0	—	0	4
Career totals		171	36	0	—	0	144

== Post-playing career ==
Following his retirement, Spina became a commentator for ABC Radio Grandstand in Townsville. Since 1996, the Laurie Spina Shield, a two-day carnival featuring a number of under-11 sides from around Australia, has been contested in Townsville. In 2016, the carnival featured 64 teams from around regional Queensland, south east Queensland, the Northern Territory and South Australia.

== Personal life ==
Spina is the father of former North Queensland Cowboys player Ben Spina, becoming the first father-son duo to play for the Cowboys, and former Brisbane Roar and Newcastle Jets W-League player Ashley Spina.
