= Shane Christensen =

Australian rugby league footballer

Personal information
- Full name: Shane Christensen
- Born: 20 March 1970 (age 56) Ingham, Queensland, Australia
- Height: 173 cm (5 ft 8 in)
- Weight: 80 kg (12 st 8 lb)

Playing information
- Position: Hooker
Club
Years	Team	Pld	T	G	FG	P
1990	Newcastle Knights	3	0	0	0	0
1995	North Qld Cowboys	10	1	0	0	4
	Total	13	1	0	0	4
- Source: As of 6 February 2019

Shane Christensen (born 20 March 1970) is a former professional rugby league footballer who played in the 1990s. Primarily a hooker, Christensen played for the Newcastle Knights and was a foundation player for the North Queensland Cowboys in 1995.

== Playing career ==
An Ingham product, Christensen was signed by the Newcastle Knights for their inaugural season in 1988. In Round 2 of the 1990 NSWRL season, Christensen made his first grade debut in Newcastle's 12–28 loss to the Manly Sea Eagles. During his time with the Knights, Christensen played just three games, spending the majority of his time in the under-21 and reserve grade competitions.

In 1992, Christensen returned to Ingham to play for Herbert River. In 1993 and 1994, he represented the Queensland Residents team on their tours of Papua New Guinea and South Africa. In 1994, he represented the Australian Residents against the New Zealand Residents.

In 1995, Christensen joined the newly established North Queensland Cowboys, playing in their inaugural game against the Sydney Bulldogs. Originally named to start at hooker, he came off the bench after Dean Schifilliti passed a late fitness test. After 10 games with the Cowboys, he left the club at the end of the season. In 1996, he played one more season in Ingham before retiring.

== Post-playing career ==
After retiring, Christensen settled in Townsville, where he taught at Shalom Christian College and coached Souths Townsville.
