= Ian Dunemann =

Australian rugby league footballer

Personal information
- Born: Brisbane, Queensland, Australia

Playing information
- Position: Halfback, Five-eighth
Club
Years	Team	Pld	T	G	FG	P
1995–97	North Qld Cowboys	32	6	7	0	38
2006–07	Lézignan Sangliers
	Total	32	6	7	0	38
- Relatives: Andrew Dunemann (brother)

Ian Dunemann is an Australian former professional rugby league footballer who played in the 1990s. Primarily a halfback or five-eighth, he was a foundation player for the North Queensland Cowboys.

== Background ==
Born in Brisbane, Dunemann grew up in Toowoomba, where he played his junior rugby league for the Newtown Lions and attended Harristown State High School. In 1992, he started at halfback in Harristown's 16–17 Commonwealth Bank Cup final loss to Patrician Brothers' College, Fairfield. His teammates from that team included his younger brother Andrew and future Australian and Queensland representative Steve Price.

== Playing career ==
In 1992, Dunemann started at five-eighth for the Queensland under-19 side in their 12–26 loss to New South Wales at Lang Park.

In 1995, Dunemann joined with the newly established North Queensland Cowboys. He made his first grade debut in Round 1 of the 1995 ARL season, starting at five-eighth in the Cowboys' first ever game, a 16–32 loss to the Sydney Bulldogs, in which he kicked three goals. In Round 15 of the 1995 season, he scored a try in the Cowboys' first ever home win, a 31–12 victory over the Western Suburbs Magpies.

In 1996, Dunemann's younger brother Andrew joined the Cowboys. In Round 10 of the 1996 season, the brothers started in the halves together in a 14–38 loss to the Sydney City Roosters. In doing so, they became the first pair of brothers to play for the club. In 1997, Dunemann's final year at the Cowboys, he played just six games, scoring tries. In 1998, Dunemann played for the Townsville Stingers in the Queensland Cup.

In 2000, he played for the Central Comets, before returning to Toowoomba to play for the Newtown Lions.

In 2006, Dunemann joined the Lézignan Sangliers, being part of the side that lost the 2006/07 Elite One Championship Grand Final.

== Statistics ==
=== ARL/Super League ===
Season	Team	Matches	T	G	GK %	F/G	Pts
1995	North Queensland	13	2	7	63.6	0	22
1996	North Queensland	13	2	0	0.0	0	8
1997	North Queensland	6	2	0	—	0	8
Career totals		32	6	7	58.3	0	38
