= Aaron Ketchell =

Australian rugby league footballer

Personal information
- Born: 18 March 1977 (age 49)

Playing information
- Position: Second-row
Club
Years	Team	Pld	T	G	FG	P
1995–97	North Qld Cowboys	12	0	0	0	0

Aaron Ketchell (born 18 March 1977) is an Australian former professional rugby league footballer who played in the 1990s. Primarily a second-row, he was a foundation player for the North Queensland Cowboys.

== Background ==
A Tully Tigers junior, Ketchell attended Tully State High School, where he represented the Australian Schoolboys in 1994. He is an Indigenous Australian.

== Playing career ==
In 1994, Ketchell represented the Queensland under-17 side, starting at second-row in their 14–28 loss to New South Wales. In 1995, Ketchell signed with the newly established North Queensland Cowboys, and was the youngest player in the club's inaugural first grade squad. Cowboys' head coach at the time, Grant Bell, later said of Ketchell, "He was regarded as the next big thing."

In Round 20 of the 1995 ARL season, Ketchell made his first grade debut for the North Queensland Cowboys as an 18-year old in a 10–12 loss to the Western Reds. In his rookie season, he played three games for the club. Over the next two seasons, Ketchell would play nine more games for the Cowboys, before being released at the end of the 1997 season.

== Statistics ==
=== ARL/Super League ===
Season	Team	Matches	T	G	GK %	F/G	Pts
1995	North Queensland	3	0	0	—	0	0
1996	North Queensland	6	0	0	—	0	0
1997	North Queensland	3	0	0	—	0	0
Career totals		12	0	0	—	0	0
