= Wayne Sing =

Australian rugby league footballer

Personal information
- Full name: Wayne Sing
- Born: 8 January 1968 (age 57); Sydney, New South Wales, Australia

Playing information
- Position: Second-row, Prop
Club
Years	Team	Pld	T	G	FG	P
1988–91	Balmain Tigers	14	0	0	0	0
1992–94	Eastern Suburbs	14	0	0	0	0
1995–96	North Qld Cowboys	35	0	0	0	0
1997	Paris Saint-Germain	22	2	0	0	8
	Total	85	2	0	0	8
- Source: As of 23 January 2019

Wayne Sing (born 8 January 1968) is an Australian former professional rugby league footballer who played professionally who played in the 1980s and 1990s. Primarily a second-rower, he played for the Balmain Tigers, Eastern Suburbs Roosters, North Queensland Cowboys and Paris Saint-Germain.

== Playing career ==
A Dubbo junior, Sing represented the New South Wales under-19 side in 1987, before being signed by the Balmain Tigers.

In Round 19 of the 1988 NSWRL season, Sing made his first grade debut in Balmain's 16–22 loss to the Western Suburbs Magpies. He did not feature again in first grade for the Tigers until 1991, when he played 13 games. In 1992, he moved to the Eastern Suburbs Roosters but struggled for game time, playing just 14 games over three seasons.

In 1995, he joined the newly established North Queensland Cowboys, playing in their inaugural game against the Sydney Bulldogs. Sing played his first full season of first grade for the Cowboys in 1995, playing 20 games. At the end of the season, he won the club's Player of the Year and Players' Player awards. In 1996, he played 15 games for the club before departing at the end of the season.

In 1997, Sing played for Paris Saint-Germain in the Super League.

== Achievements and accolades ==
=== Individual ===
- North Queensland Cowboys Player of the Year: 1995
- North Queensland Cowboys Players' Player: 1995

== Statistics ==
=== NSWRL/ARL ===
Season	Team	Matches	T	G	GK %	F/G	Pts
1988	Balmain	1	0	0	—	0	0
1991	Balmain	13	0	0	—	0	0
1992	Eastern Suburbs	7	0	0	—	0	0
1993	Eastern Suburbs	5	0	0	—	0	0
1994	Eastern Suburbs	2	0	0	—	0	0
1995	North Queensland	20	0	0	—	0	0
1996	North Queensland	15	0	0	—	0	0
Career totals		63	0	0	—	0	0

=== Super League ===
Season	Team	Matches	T	G	GK %	F/G	Pts
1997	Paris Saint-Germain	22	2	0	—	0	8
Career totals		22	2	0	—	0	8

== Post-playing career ==
Following his retirement, Sing returned to Dubbo, coaching the Dubbo CYMS under-18 side.

== Personal life ==
Sing's father, Noel, was also a professional rugby league player, playing for the Penrith Panthers between 1971 and 1973.
