= Justin Loomans =

Australian rugby league footballer

Personal information
- Born: 22 May 1975 (age 50); Rockhampton, Queensland, Australia
- Height: 179 cm (5 ft 10 in)
- Weight: 78 kg (12 st 4 lb)

Playing information
- Position: Wing, Centre
Club
Years	Team	Pld	T	G	FG	P
1995–97	North Qld Cowboys	44	19	0	0	76
1998–99	South Sydney	35	12	0	0	48
	Total	79	31	0	0	124
- Source: As of 11 August 2017

Justin Loomans (born 22 May 1975) is an Australian former professional rugby league footballer who played in the 1990s. He played for the North Queensland Cowboys in their inaugural season and later played for the South Sydney Rabbitohs. He primarily played on the wing or at centre.

== Background ==
Born in Rockhampton, Queensland, Loomans is of Indigenous Australian descent and attended Rockhampton State High School. He was originally a Brisbane Broncos scholarship holder, before being signed by the North Queensland Cowboys in 1994.

== Playing career ==
In Round 4 of the 1995 ARL season, at age 19, Loomans made his first-grade debut for the Cowboys in an 8–14 loss to the Canberra Raiders. He scored his first try a week later, in the Cowboys' 12–20 loss to the Brisbane Broncos. In Round 8, he played in the club's first-ever win, a 14–10 victory over the Illawarra Steelers. Loomans ended his first season as the Cowboys' equal top try scorer, scoring nine tries in 16 appearances.

In 1996, Loomans was again the Cowboys' equal top try scorer, scoring eight tries in 21 appearances. In 1997, the Cowboys competed in the breakaway Super League competition, with Loomans playing just seven games and scoring two tries.

In 1998, Loomans moved to Sydney, joining the South Sydney Rabbitohs. Over two seasons, he scored 12 tries in the 35 games for the struggling side including a try in Souths final match against Parramatta before the club was controversially axed from the competition. When the Rabbitohs were excluded from the NRL at the end of the 1999 season, Loomans returned to Queensland to play in the Queensland Cup. He played for the Easts Tigers and his hometown club, the Central Comets, scoring 39 tries for them.

== Statistics ==
=== ARL/SL/NRL ===
Season	Team	Matches	T	G	GK %	F/G	Pts
1995	North Queensland	16	9	0	—	0	36
1996	North Queensland	21	8	0	—	0	32
1997	North Queensland	7	2	0	—	0	8
1998	South Sydney	14	5	0	—	0	20
1999	South Sydney	21	7	0	—	0	28
Career totals		79	31	0	—	0	124

== Post-playing career ==
Following his retirement, Loomans became a mentor and trainer for the Central Queensland NRL bid's junior development program and Operations Manager of Central Queensland Indigenous Development.
