= Paul Galea =

Australian rugby league footballer

Personal information
- Born: 19 February 1970 (age 56) Mackay, Queensland, Australia

Playing information
- Position: Centre, Second-row, Lock
Club
Years	Team	Pld	T	G	FG	P
1992–94	Gold Coast Seagulls	18	1	0	0	4
1995–97	North Qld Cowboys	25	4	0	0	16
	Total	43	5	0	0	20
- Relatives: Brett Galea (brother)

Paul Galea (born 19 February 1970) is an Australian former professional rugby league footballer who played in the 1990s. Primarily a second-row, he played for the Gold Coast Seagulls and was a foundation player for the North Queensland Cowboys.

== Background ==
Originally from Moranbah, Queensland, Galea played for the Mackay Magpies and was selected in the Australian Schoolboys under-15 merit side in 1985. His younger brother Brett played first grade for the Brisbane Broncos and Adelaide Rams.

== Playing career ==
In 1992, Galea joined the Gold Coast Seagulls after playing for the Fortitude Valley Diehards. In Round 4 of the 1992 NSWRL season, he made his first grade debut in a 20–0 loss to the Cronulla Sharks. He spent three seasons with the Gold Coast, playing 18 games, scoring one try.

In 1995, Galea joined the newly formed North Queensland Cowboys, and started at lock in their inaugural game. In his first season with the Cowboys, he played 19 games, scoring four tries, and won the club's Club Person of the Year award. Galea played just six games for the Cowboys over the following two seasons, leaving the club at the end of the 1997 season.

== Achievements and accolades ==
=== Individual ===
- North Queensland Cowboys Club Person of the Year: 1995

== Statistics ==
=== NSWRL/ARL/Super League ===
Season	Team	Matches	T	G	GK %	F/G	Pts
1992	Gold Coast	7	0	0	—	0	0
1993	Gold Coast	6	1	0	—	0	4
1994	Gold Coast	5	0	0	—	0	0
1995	North Queensland	19	4	0	—	0	16
1996	North Queensland	5	0	0	—	0	0
1997	North Queensland	1	0	0	—	0	0
Career totals		43	5	0	–	0	20

== Post-playing career ==
In 2010, while coaching the Mackay Magpies under-11 side, Galea was banned from coaching junior rugby league for two-and-a-half years after punching an official.
