= Ashley Spina =

Australian soccer player

Personal information
- Full name: Ashley Spina
- Date of birth: 3 October 1992 (age 34)
- Place of birth: Ingham, Australia
- Height: 1.74 m (5 ft 8 1/2 in)
- Position: Midfielder

Senior career*
Years	Team	Apps	(Gls)
2011–2013	Brisbane Roar	37	(2)
2013–2015	Newcastle Jets	20	(0)
2015–2016	Brisbane Roar	5	(0)
Father	Laurie Spina
Relatives	Ben Spina (brother)
- * Club domestic league appearances and goals as of 21 October 2016

Ashley Spina (born 3 October 1992) is an Australian football (soccer) player, who last played for Brisbane Roar in the Australian W-League.

== Personal life ==
Ashley is the sister of North Queensland Cowboys forward Ben Spina and daughter of North Queensland Cowboys first ever captain Laurie Spina.
