= Damian Gibson =

Wales international rugby league footballer and coach

Personal information
- Born: 14 May 1975 (age 51) Emerald, Queensland, Australia

Playing information
- Height: 178 cm (5 ft 10 in)
- Weight: 83 kg (13 st 1 lb)
- Position: Fullback, Centre, Wing
Club
Years	Team	Pld	T	G	FG	P
1995–96	North Qld Cowboys	31	7	1	0	30
1997	Leeds Rhinos	28	6	0	0	24
1998–01	Halifax	114	40	0	0	160
2002	Salford City Reds	29	3	0	0	12
2003–04	Castleford Tigers	46	6	0	0	24
2005–08	Halifax	86	47	0	0	188
2009	Sheffield Eagles	20	13	0	0	52
	Total	354	122	1	0	490
Representative
Years	Team	Pld	T	G	FG	P
1999–08	Wales	16	6	0	0	24

Damian Gibson (born 14 May 1975) is a former Wales international rugby league footballer. Primarily a fullback, Gibson was the North Queensland Cowboys first ever try scorer.

== Early life ==
Gibson was born and raised in Rockhampton, Queensland, Australia.

He attended Emmaus College before being signed by the Newcastle Knights.

== Playing career ==
After spending 1994 with the Newcastle Knights, where he represented the NSW City under-19 side, Gibson signed with the newly established North Queensland Cowboys. In Round 1 of the 1995 ARL season, Gibson made his first grade début as a 19-year-old in the North Queensland Cowboys first ever game. He scored the club's first ever try in the 16–32 loss to the Canterbury-Bankstown Bulldogs, and was named in the Norwich Rising Star Team of 95. He spent two seasons with the Cowboys, scoring 7 tries in 31 games and was the North Queensland Cowboys Top Tryscorer in 1996.

In 1997, Gibson joined the Leeds Rhinos in the Super League, scoring three tries and being named their Player of the Year. He transferred to the Halifax Blue Sox in 1998, where he spent the majority of his career. During his first stint with Halifax, he scored 40 tries in 113 games. In June 1998, he made his international début for Wales, in a 15–12 loss to England.

In 2002, he joined the Salford City Reds, spending one season at the Willows before moving to the Castleford Tigers in 2003, following the Reds' relegation. He re-joined Halifax in November 2004 after being released by the Castleford Tigers following their relegation from Super League and went on to score 15 tries in 30 appearances in 2005. After four more seasons at Halifax, Gibson joined the Sheffield Eagles in 2009, retiring at the end of the season.

== Statistics ==
=== ARL ===
Season	Team	Matches	T	G	GK %	F/G	Pts
1995	North Queensland	20	3	1	100.0	0	14
1996	North Queensland	11	3	0	—	0	16
Career totals		31	7	1	100.0	0	30

=== Super League ===
Season	Team	Matches	T	G	GK %	F/G	Pts
1997	Leeds	-	3	0	—	0	12
1998	Halifax	25	6	0	—	0	24
1999	Halifax	31	11	0	—	0	44
2000	Halifax	28	10	0	—	0	40
2001	Halifax	29	13	0	—	0	52
2002	Salford	29	3	0	—	0	12
2003	Castleford	23	3	0	—	0	12
2004	Castleford	23	3	0	—	0	12
Career totals		188	52	0	—	0	208

== Post-playing career ==
Following his retirement, Gibson served as an assistant coach for the Exiles rugby league team, Leeds Rhinos, Welsh national team, and the Dewsbury Rams. While at the Rhinos, he coached the club's under-18 and under-20 sides and was on the coaching staff for their 2011 Super League Grand Final winning season.
