= Bruce Sinclair (rugby league) =

Australian rugby league footballer

Personal information
- Full name: Bruce Sinclair
- Born: 25 January 1965 (age 60); Tamworth, New South Wales, Australia

Playing information
- Position: Prop, Second-row
Club
Years	Team	Pld	T	G	FG	P
1986–88	Balmain Tigers	13	0	0	0	0
1989–90	North Sydney Bears	15	0	0	0	0
1991–94	Eastern Suburbs	50	1	0	0	4
1995	North Qld Cowboys	11	0	0	0	0
	Total	89	1	0	0	4

Bruce Sinclair (born 25 January 1965) is an Australian former professional rugby league footballer who played in the 1980s and 1990s. Primarily a prop, he played for the Balmain Tigers, North Sydney Bears, Eastern Suburbs Roosters and North Queensland Cowboys.

== Playing career ==
Recruited from Tamworth, Sinclair made his first grade debut for the Balmain Tigers in Round 24 of the 1986 NSWRL season. During his three seasons at the club, he played 13 games.

In 1989, Sinclair signed with the North Sydney Bears on a two-year contract, playing 15 games. In 1991, he moved to the Eastern Suburbs Roosters, where he played 50 games over four seasons. In 1992, he played his first full season of first grade, playing 21 of the Roosters' 22 games.

In 1995, he joined the newly-established North Queensland Cowboys, reuniting with his former Bears' teammate Kerry Boustead, who was the Cowboys' CEO. Sinclair was named the club captain for the inaugural season. He played 11 games that season, captaining the side four times, before retiring at the end of the season.

== Statistics ==
=== NSWRL/ARL ===
Season	Team	Matches	T	G	GK %	F/G	Pts
1986	Balmain	2	0	0	—	0	0
1987	Balmain	7	0	0	—	0	0
1988	Balmain	4	0	0	—	0	0
1989	North Sydney	9	0	0	—	0	0
1990	North Sydney	6	0	0	—	0	0
1991	Eastern Suburbs	9	0	0	—	0	0
1992	Eastern Suburbs	21	0	0	—	0	0
1993	Eastern Suburbs	8	0	0	—	0	0
1994	Eastern Suburbs	12	1	0	—	0	4
1995	North Queensland	11	0	0	—	0	0
Career totals		89	1	0	—	0	4
