= Scott Brown (rugby league) =

Australian rugby league footballer

Personal information
- Born: 7 May 1971 (age 54)
- Height: 185 cm (6 ft 1 in)
- Weight: 88 kg (13 st 12 lb)

Playing information
- Position: Five-eighth
Club
Years	Team	Pld	T	G	FG	P
1994	Cronulla Sharks	1	0	0	0	0
1996	North Qld Cowboys	6	0	0	0	0
	Total	7	0	0	0	0
- Source: As of 13 February 2020

Scott Brown (born 7 May 1971) is an Australian former rugby league footballer who played for the Cronulla-Sutherland Sharks and North Queensland Cowboys in the 1990s. He primarily played five-eighth.

== Playing career ==
In 1989 and 1990, he played for the Ipswich Jets in the Winfield State League. In 1989, Brown represented the Queensland under-19 side, starting at five-eighth in a 16–22 loss to New South Wales.

In Round 20 of the 1994 NSWRL season, Brown made his first grade debut in the Cronulla Sharks' 10–38 loss to the Manly Sea Eagles at Brookvale Oval Later that season he started at five-eighth in the Sharks' reserve grade Grand Final winning side.

In 1996, after not playing a first grade game for Cronulla in 1995, Brown joined the North Queensland Cowboys. He played six games for the club, starting all at five-eighth.
