= Michael Hogue =

Australian rugby league footballer

Personal information
- Born: 31 March 1975 (age 51) Townsville, Queensland, Australia

Playing information
- Position: Prop
Club
| Years | Team | Pld | T | G | FG | P |
|---|---|---|---|---|---|---|
| 1995 | North Qld Cowboys | 4 | 0 | 0 | 0 | 0 |
| 1997 | Paris Saint-Germain | | 0 | 0 | 0 | 0 |
| | Total | 4 | 0 | 0 | 0 | 0 |

Michael Hogue (born 31 March 1975) is an Australian former professional rugby league footballer who played in the 1990s. Primarily a prop, he was a foundation player for the North Queensland Cowboys.

== Background ==
Born in Townsville, Queensland, Hogue played his junior rugby league for Townsville Brothers and attended Ignatius Park College.

== Playing career ==
In 1994, Hogue represented the Queensland under-19 side, before signing with the North Queensland Cowboys.

In Round 14 of the 1995 ARL season, Hogue made his first grade debut for the Cowboys in a 10–40 loss to the Penrith Panthers. A week later, he played in the club's first ever home win, a 31–12 victory over the Western Suburbs Magpies. In 1997, after spending the 1996 season in reserve grade, he joined Paris Saint-Germain for the Super League II season.
