= George Bartlett (rugby league) =

Australian rugby league footballer

Personal information
- Born: 24 October 1968 (age 56)
- Height: 180 cm (5 ft 11 in)
- Weight: 93 kg (14 st 9 lb)

Playing information
- Position: Second-row, Lock
Club
Years	Team	Pld	T	G	FG	P
1988–91	Parramatta Eels	8	0	0	0	0
1992–94	North Sydney Bears	19	1	0	0	4
1995–96	Nth Qld Cowboys	27	3	0	0	12
	Total	54	4	0	0	16

George Bartlett (born 24 October 1968) is an Australian former professional rugby league footballer from the 1990s. A lock or second-rower, he played for the Parramatta Eels, North Sydney Bears and North Queensland Cowboys.

== Playing career ==
A Central Coast junior, Bartlett made his first grade debut for the Parramatta Eels in Round 20 of the 1988 NSWRL season. Over four seasons with the Eels, he played just eight games.

In 1992, he joined the North Sydney Bears. He enjoyed his best season to date in 1993, playing 17 games. He left the club at the end of 1994, after just one appearance in first grade.

In 1995, Bartlett joined the newly established North Queensland Cowboys. He came off the bench in their inaugural game against the Sydney Bulldogs. In Round 8 of the 1995 season, he started at lock in the club's first ever win against the Illawarra Steelers. At the end of the 1996 season, after 27 games for the Cowboys, he retired.

== Statistics ==
=== NSWRL/ARL ===
Season	Team	Matches	T	G	GK %	F/G	Pts
1988	Parramatta	2	0	0	—	0	0
1990	Parramatta	2	0	0	—	0	0
1991	Parramatta	4	0	0	—	0	0
1992	North Sydney	1	0	0	—	0	0
1993	North Sydney	17	1	0	—	0	4
1994	North Sydney	1	0	0	—	0	0
1995	North Queensland	21	2	0	—	0	8
1996	North Queensland	6	1	0	—	0	3
Career totals		54	4	0	—	0	16

== Post-playing career ==
Following his retirement, Bartlett worked as head coach of the Kirwan State High School rugby league team. He is now currently the Deputy Principal at Beenleigh State High School in the South-Eastern region of Queensland
