= Andrew Whittington (rugby league) =

Australian rugby league footballer

Personal information
- Born: 28 May 1971 (age 54)

Playing information
- Position: Prop
Club
Years	Team	Pld	T	G	FG	P
1992–94	Gold Coast Seagulls	20	1	0	0	4
1995	North Qld Cowboys	11	0	0	0	0
	Total	31	1	0	0	4

Andrew Whittington (born 28 May 1971) is an Australian former professional rugby league footballer who played in the 1990s. Primarily a prop, he began his career with the Gold Coast Seagulls and was a foundation member of the North Queensland Cowboys.

== Playing career ==
In Round 14 of the 1992 NSWRL season, Whittington made his first grade debut for the Gold Coast Seagulls. In Round 19 of the 1993 season, he scored his first try in a 13–16 loss to the South Sydney Rabbitohs. Over three seasons with the Gold Coast, he played 20 games.

In 1995, Whittington joined the newly established North Queensland Cowboys. As part of his contract, he worked as the head groundskeeper at Stockland Stadium, the club's home ground. The job required him to stay overnight on occasion to turn the sprinkler system on. Whittington played in the club's inaugural match against the Sydney Bulldogs, starting at prop. He played 11 games for the Cowboys in 1995, departing at the end of the season.

In 1996, after not signing a Super League contract, Whittington returned to the Gold Coast Chargers, playing for their reserve grade side.

In 1999, Whittington played for the Ipswich Jets in the Queensland Cup, before moving to the Tweed Heads Seagulls. In 2000, he represented the NSW Country representative side.

== Statistics ==
=== NSWRL/ARL ===
Season	Team	Matches	T	G	GK %	F/G	Pts
1992	Gold Coast	1	0	0	—	0	0
1993	Gold Coast	14	1	0	—	0	4
1994	Gold Coast	5	0	0	—	0	0
1995	North Queensland	11	0	0	—	0	0
Career totals		31	1	0	—	4	0
