= Steve Edmed =

Australian rugby league footballer

Personal information
- Born: 10 February 1968 (age 58) Sydney, New South Wales, Australia
- Height: 187 cm (6 ft 2 in)
- Weight: 108 kg (17 st 0 lb)

Playing information
- Position: Prop, Second-row
Club
Years	Team	Pld	T	G	FG	P
1988–95	Balmain Tigers	136	5	0	0	20
1996	North Qld Cowboys	21	1	0	0	4
1997	Sheffield Eagles	20	0	0	0	0
	Total	177	6	0	0	24

Steve Edmed (born 10 February 1968) is an Australian former professional rugby league footballer who played in the 1980s and 1990s. Primarily a prop, he played for the Balmain Tigers, North Queensland Cowboys and Sheffield Eagles.

== Playing career ==
A Tweed Heads Seagulls junior, Edmed represented the New South Wales under-19 side in 1987, starting at second-row in their 31–18 win over Queensland. He made his first grade debut for the Balmain Tigers in Round 3 of the 1988 NSWRL season. That season, he came off the bench in the Tigers' Grand Final loss to the Canterbury-Bankstown Bulldogs.

In 1989, Edmed became a starting prop for the Tigers, playing 18 games, including the club's Grand Final loss to the Canberra Raiders. Over then next six seasons, Edmed remained a regular starter for Balmain. He left the club at the end of the 1995 season, having played 136 games.

In 1996, Edmed joined the North Queensland Cowboys. Edmed was one of the major beneficiaries of the Super League war, reportedly signed to a $225,000 per year contract with the club.

He played 21 games for the Cowboys that season, winning the club's Player of the Year and Players' Player awards. Graham Lowe, the Cowboys head coach in 1996, later said, "You heard criticism about the money Super League paid him but his effort and consistent performances were terrific. He was worth every cent and I think he was as good as any prop that season."

In 1997, Edmed signed with the Sheffield Eagles in the Super League, spending one season at the club before retiring due to a neck injury.

== Achievements and accolades ==
=== Individual ===
North Queensland Cowboys Player of the Year: 1996
North Queensland Cowboys Players' Player: 1996

== Statistics ==
=== NSWRL/ARL ===
Season	Team	Matches	T	G	GK %	F/G	Pts
1988	Balmain	16	1	0	—	0	4
1989	Balmain	18	2	0	—	0	8
1990	Balmain	14	0	0	—	0	0
1991	Balmain	8	0	0	—	0	0
1992	Balmain	22	0	0	—	0	0
1993	Balmain	19	1	0	—	0	4
1994	Balmain	21	0	0	—	0	0
1995	Balmain	18	1	0	—	0	4
1996	North Queensland	21	1	0	—	0	4
Career totals		157	6	0	–	0	24

== Personal life ==
Edmed's son, Tane, played SG Ball Cup for the Balmain Tigers and currently plays for the NSW Waratahs Super Rugby team, and had one appearance for Australia in 2024.
