= Peter Deakin (rugby) =

English rugby league and rugby administrator

Personal information
- Full name: Peter Deakin
- Born: 18 October 1953
- Died: 1 February 2003 (aged 49)

Playing information
- Position: Second-row
Club
Years	Team	Pld	T	G	FG	P
1978–79	Oldham RLFC	4	0	0	0	0
- As of 8 July 2021

Peter Deakin (18 October 1953 – 1 February 2003) was a rugby league and rugby union administrator. He also had a short career as a professional rugby league footballer.

== Biography ==
Deakin made four appearances in professional rugby league as a second-row for Oldham, but was forced to retire due to injury.

After a spell learning the industry of sports marketing in America, he returned to England and joined Bradford Bulls as a marketing executive in 1995. Along with coach Brian Smith, Deakin helped revolutionise the club's image ahead of the inaugural Super League season. As a result, crowds at Odsal Stadium rose sharply; the club's average crowd was over 10,000 in 1996, and by the end of the club's second season in Super League in 1997, the average attendance was over 15,000.

Following this success, Premiership rugby union club Saracens owner Nigel Wray recruited him, and he delivered five-figure crowds, including the then record 19,000 crowd at Saracens' Watford home.

He took over at Warrington Wolves in rugby league, but he felt there were those at Wilderspool who did not share his vision, and after securing the Community Stadium (now renamed Halliwell Jones Stadium), he left.

After a short tenure he bought into the vision of Sale Sharks' owner Brian Kennedy and started the processes which eventually led to Sale Sharks crowds of over 10,000, and the club's Guinness Premiership victory in 2006. After another spell at Saracens, he died of cancer in 2003.

Deakin was remembered by the naming of the Man of the Match Trophy in the Guinness Premiership Final.
