= Graham White (rugby league) =

Australian rugby league footballer

Playing information
- Position: Halfback
Club
Years	Team	Pld	T	G	FG	P
1996	North Qld Cowboys	1	0	0	0	0
Representative
Years	Team	Pld	T	G	FG	P
1992	Australian Aborigines
- Source: As of 13 February 2020

Graham White is a former Australian rugby league footballer who played for the North Queensland Cowboys in the 1990s. He primarily played halfback.

== Playing career ==
Of Indigenous Australian descent, White represented the Australian Aboriginal side at the 1992 Pacific Cup. From 1992 to 1994, he was selected in the Queensland Aboriginal team. In 1993 and 1995, he was selected in the Queensland Residents side.

In Round 15 of the 1996 ARL season, White made his first grade debut in the Cowboys' 32–40 loss to the Western Suburbs Magpies at Campbelltown Stadium.

In 1997, after leaving the Cowboys, White joined the Central Queensland Capras in the Queensland Cup, later captaining the side. That season he represented the Queensland Residents. He spent five seasons with the club, playing 102 games, scoring 383 points. In 2003, he played for the Easts Tigers.

In 2019, he was named in the Rockhampton Indigenous and Torres Strait Islander All Star Team of the Century.
