= Paul Morris (1990s rugby league) =

Australian rugby league footballer

Personal information
- Born: Rockhampton, Queensland, Australia

Playing information
- Position: Wing
Club
Years	Team	Pld	T	G	FG	P
1994	Brisbane Broncos	4	1	0	0	4
1995	North Qld Cowboys	2	0	0	0	0
	Total	6	1	0	0	4

Paul Morris is an Australian former professional rugby league footballer who played in the 1990s. Primarily a winger, he played for the Brisbane Broncos and was a foundation player for the North Queensland Cowboys.

== Playing career ==
Originally from Rockhampton, Morris made his first grade debut for the Brisbane Broncos in Round 13 of the 1994 NSWRL season, starting on the wing and scoring a try in their 10–29 loss to the Canberra Raiders. He would play three more games for them that season, coming off the bench in all three, before joining the North Queensland Cowboys.

A foundation player for the newly formed club, Morris played two games for the Cowboys in 1995, coming off the bench in both.
