= Noel Slade =

Australian rugby league footballer

Playing information
Club
Years	Team	Pld	T	G	FG	P
1995	North Qld Cowboys	1	0	0	0	0

Noel Slade is an Australian former professional rugby league footballer who played in the 1990s. He was a foundation player for the North Queensland Cowboys.

== Playing career ==
In Round 22 of the 1995 ARL season, Slade made his first grade debut in the North Queensland Cowboys 66–4 loss to the Sydney Bulldogs. After leaving the Cowboys, he played for Centrals in Townsville before moving back to Ivanhoes in Cairns.
