= Ray Blackman =

Australian rugby league footballer and now doctor

Raymond Blackman
Playing information
- Position: Wing
Club
Years	Team	Pld	T	G	FG	P
1995	North Qld Cowboys	3	1	0	0	4

Ray Blackman is an Australian former professional rugby league footballer who played in the 1990s. Primarily a wing, he was a foundation player for the North Queensland Cowboys.

== Playing career ==
In 1991, Blackman started on the wing in the North Queensland Marlins side that defeated the Central Queensland Comets in the Grand Final of the Winfield State League, scoring a try. In 1992, he scored two tries for the Marlins, renamed the Northern Division, in their Grand Final loss to the Brisbane Capitols.

In Round 19 of the 1995 ARL season, Blackman made his first grade debut for the North Queensland Cowboys in a 22–6 loss to the South Queensland Crushers. In his first (and only) season with the Cowboys, Blackman started three games on the wing, scoring one try.
