= Andrew Bulmer =

Australian rugby league footballer

Playing information
- Position: Second-row
Club
Years	Team	Pld	T	G	FG	P
1996	North Qld Cowboys	1	0	0	0	0
- Source: As of 13 February 2020

Andrew Bulmer is an Australian former rugby league footballer who played for the North Queensland Cowboys in the 1990s. He primarily played second-row.

== Playing career ==
A Townsville Brothers junior, Bulmer represented the Queensland under-19 side in 1994, starting at second-row, before joining the North Queensland Cowboys in 1995. In Round 9 of the 1996 ARL season, he made his first grade debut in the Cowboys' 12–26 loss to the Parramatta Eels.

In 1997, he played for the Cairns Cyclones in the Queensland Cup.
