= Grant Bell =

Australian rugby league coach

Personal information
- Born: 2 May 1962 (age 64)

Coaching information
Club
Years	Team	Gms	W	D	L	W%
1995	North Queensland	22	2	0	20	9
- Source: As of 22:18, 30 November 2009 (UTC)

Grant Bell is a rugby league football coach. He was the first coach of the North Queensland Cowboys in 1995. He is currently coaching the Centrals club in the Townsville Rugby League competition.

== Coaching career ==
In 1995 Bell became the first coach of the new North Queensland Cowboys franchise. Before coaching at first grade level, Bell had been with the Gold Coast Seagulls, coaching the Presidents Cup (Under 21) side in 1992 and the Reserve Grade in 1993.

Bell later went on to coach the North Queensland Young Guns, the Cowboys' feeder club in 2005 and won the Queensland Cup.

After serving as assistant coach to Graham Murray at the North Queensland Cowboys, Bell was appointed coach of the club's Toyota Cup National Youth Competition team.

In 2010, Bell was in charge of the Centrals Tigers, a team he coached in 1999 and 2003.
