= Foley Shield =

North Queensland rugby league competition

The Foley Shield is a rugby league competition in North Queensland administered by the Queensland Rugby League.

Prior to 1948 an inter-town competition known as the Carlton Cup was contested in North Queensland. This was revamped, and renamed in honour of Arch Foley, a member of the 1918 Townsville representative team that travelled north to Cairns, and south throughout Central Queensland. He was a founding member of the Townsville Souths rugby league club, and with later Australian Prime Minister Arthur Fadden formed the North Queensland Rugby League in 1919.

In 1948 the competition was structured into a Northern Zone (Cairns, Babinda, Tully and Eacham) and a Southern Zone (Mackay, Ayr and Townsville). The following year, a Central Zone (Herbert River, Charters Towers and Home Hill) was added. The grand final was played in Townsville, and was a highlight of the rugby league calendar.

The Foley Shield continued to be held annually until the introduction of the statewide Queensland Cup competition in 1996. In 2000 the competition was reinstated, and was contested by Cairns, Mackay and Townsville.

In an attempt to re-invent the competition and renew the tradition and passion in the shield, Mount Isa, with the Mid-West league, (Mount Isa-Mid West) and Innisfail-Eacham returned to the competition and Cape York/Torres Strait joined the competition, and the Shield was played as a round robin at the Townsville Sports Reserve over the Easter weekend in 2009. In 2010, the competition was moved to the Labour Day Long Weekend, with a preliminary round played in regional centres over the Anzac Day Long Weekend.

In 2011, the competition moved to the 20th to 22 May to be played in Townsville, with no preliminary round played. Townsville will split into two zones, Townsville City and Townsville Country. This brings the Townsville district in line with their Juniors, who found the move successful. This has followed the lead of Cairns who split. into Cairns and Innisfail-Eacham. Also, the re-introduction of Bowen to the Foley Shield (Formerly part of Whitsunday) who will combine with Palm Island, who play a 7 team A-Grade Competition. They will be known as Bowen-Palm Island. Mount Isa-Mid West will be known as Northern Outback, and Cape-Torres will be known as Remote Areas Rugby League. (RARL)

== Teams ==
Team	Championships	Year
Cairns	14	1953, 1955, 1958, 1966, 1970, 1971, 1974, 1976, 1986, 1993, 1995, 2005, 2006, 2008
Townsville (pre 2011)	12, 1 Drawn	1949, 1956, 1957, 1962, 1967, 1982 (Drawn with Herbert River), 1987, 2000, 2001, 2002, 2003, 2007, 2010
Mount Isa, Mount Isa/Mid West, Northern Outback	8	1969, 1972, 1977, 1978, 1979, 1981, 1983, 1985, 1988
Mackay	7	1959, 1984, 1991, 1992, 1994, 2004, 2011
Innisfail	4	1960, 1964, 1968, 1975
Herbert River	3, 1 Drawn	1952, 1965, 1980, 1982 (Drawn with Townsville)
Innsifail-Eacham	3	1989, 1990, 2009
Babinda	2	1948, 1951
Ayr, Burdekin	2	1950, 1954
Eacham	1	1961
Tully	1	1963
Whitsunday	1	1973
Cape-Torres Strait (from 2009)	0	
Townsville City (from 2011)	0	
Townsville Country (from 2011)	0	

== Grand Final results ==
- 1948: Babinda 7 defeated Ayr 2
- 1949: Townsville 22 defeated Cairns 13
- 1950: Ayr 23 defeated Cairns 15
- 1951: Babinda 19 defeated Ayr 15
- 1952: Herbert River 15 defeated Babinda 4
- 1953: Cairns 18 defeated Townsville 15
- 1954: Ayr 18 defeated Cairns 12
- 1955: Cairns 26 defeated Townsville 17
- 1956: Townsville 23 defeated Cairns 16
- 1957: Townsville 38 defeated Cairns 15
- 1958: Cairns 29 defeated Townsville 15
- 1959: Mackay 29 defeated Cairns 18
- 1960: Innisfail 12 defeated Herbert River 9
- 1961: Eacham 35 defeated Mackay 10
- 1962: Townsville 8 defeated Eacham 3
- 1963: Tully 29 defeated Burdekin 15
- 1964: Innisfail 30 defeated Townsville 8
- 1965: Herbert River 14 defeated Cairns 7
- 1966: Cairns 14 defeated Townsville 10
- 1967: Townsville 16 defeated Innisfail 15
- 1968: Innisfail 22 defeated Mackay 12
- 1969: Mount Isa 12 defeated Townsville 9
- 1970: Cairns 12 defeated Townsville 9
- 1971: Cairns 37 defeated Whitsunday 6
- 1972: Mount Isa 19 defeated Innisfail 16
- 1973: Whitsunday 19 defeated Innisfail 16
- 1974: Cairns 12 defeated Mount Isa 6
- 1975: Innisfail 15 defeated Townsville 4
- 1976: Cairns 11 defeated Townsville 10
- 1977: Mount Isa 18 defeated Innisfail 16
- 1978: Mount Isa 15 defeated Mackay 12
- 1979: Mount Isa 26 defeated Townsville 6
- 1980: Herbert River 18 defeated Burdekin 13
- 1981: Mount Isa 13 defeated Innisfail 9
- 1982: Townsville 25 drew with Herbert River 25 (both teams were declared joint winners after the scores were tied after extra time)
- 1983: Mount Isa 22 defeated Townsville 10
- 1984: Mackay 21 defeated Mount Isa 4
- 1985: Mount Isa 26 defeated Burdekin 2
- 1986: Cairns 36 defeated Townsville 34
- 1987: Townsville 30 defeated Cairns 26
- 1988: Mount Isa 22 defeated Mackay 18
- 1989: Innisfail-Eacham 40 defeated Mackay 12
- 1990: Innisfail-Eacham 28 defeated Cairns 14
- 1991: Mackay 30 defeated Cairns 22
- 1992: Mackay 31 defeated Mount Isa 12
- 1993: Cairns 30 defeated Mackay 24
- 1994: Mackay 22 defeated Cairns 6
- 1995: Cairns 34 defeated Mackay 24
- 2000: Townsville 40 defeated Mackay 16
- 2001: Townsville 28 defeated Cairns 24
- 2002: Townsville 28 defeated Cairns 22
- 2003: Townsville 28 defeated Cairns 26
- 2004: Mackay 44 defeated Cairns 28
- 2005: Cairns 36 defeated Mackay 32
- 2006: Cairns 24 defeated Townsville 22
- 2007: Townsville 14 defeated Cairns 4
- 2008: Cairns 30 defeated Townsville 28
- 2009: Innisfail-Eacham 32 defeated Cape-Torres 22
- 2010: Townsville 48 defeated Mount Isa-Mid West 12
- 2011: Mackay 30 defeated Townsville City 14

== Sources ==
=== History ===
- Rleague.com World of Rugby League Queensland website
- World of Rugby League Forums
- RL1908 website
- North Queensland Cowboys website
- Foley Shield Website

=== Results ===
- "Stinging Comeback". news.com.au.
