= 1997 Super League (UK) season =

Season in rugby league

Super League II
- League: Super League
- Duration: 22 Rounds
- Teams: 12
- Highest attendance: 19,137; Leeds Rhinos vs Bradford Bulls (29 July)
- Lowest attendance: 500; Paris Saint-Germain vs Salford Reds (2 July)
- Broadcast partners: Sky Sports

1997 Season
- Champions: Bradford Bulls; 1st Super League title 3rd British title
- Premiership winners: Wigan Warriors
- Man of Steel: (England) James Lowes
- Top point-scorer: (England) Andrew Farrell (243)
- Top try-scorer: (New Zealand) Nigel Vagana (17)

Promotion and relegation
- Promoted from Division One: Huddersfield Giants; Hull Sharks
- Relegated to Division One: Oldham Bears

Resigned from League
- Dissolved: Paris Saint-Germain

Stones Bitter Super League II was the official name for the year 1997's Super League championship season, the 103rd season of top-level professional rugby league football in Britain, and the second to be played in summer.

== Teams ==
Twelve teams were selected to play in the second Super League season, however Salford Reds were promoted into the League, taking the place of relegated Workington Town.

Legend
Reigning Champions
Challenge Cup Holders
Promoted

Team	Stadium	Capacity	City/Area
Bradford Bulls	Odsal	27,000	Bradford, West Yorkshire
Castleford Tigers	Wheldon Road	11,750	Castleford, West Yorkshire
Halifax Blue Sox	Thrum Hall	9,832	Halifax, West Yorkshire
Leeds Rhinos	Headingley	21,500	Leeds, West Yorkshire
London Broncos	The Stoop	11,000	Twickenham, Greater London
Oldham Bears	Boundary Park	13,500	Oldham, Greater Manchester
Paris Saint-Germain	Sébastien Charléty Stadium	20,000	Paris, France
Salford Reds	The Willows	11,363	Salford, Greater Manchester
Sheffield Eagles	Don Valley Stadium	25,000	Sheffield, South Yorkshire
St. Helens	Knowsley Road	17,500	St Helens, Merseyside
Warrington Wolves	Wilderspool	9,200	Warrington, Cheshire
Wigan Warriors	Central Park	18,000	Wigan, Greater Manchester

== Rules changes ==
The import limit was raised from five to six, while the non-traditional markets of London and Paris were still exempted from it in an attempt to grow the game.

== Establishment of Super League (Europe) Ltd. ==
In September 1996, the twelve Super League clubs announced the formation of a separate company, Rugby League (Europe) Ltd., to oversee the circuit's activities. Bradford chairman Chris Caisley was named chairman of RLE. In December 1997, the company hired Colin Myler of Widnes, a former Daily Mirror editor and member of an old rugby league family, as chief executive. In June 1997, RLE added Peter Deakin, a former player who had studied sports management in the U.S. before overseeing Bradford' communication, as marketing director. The RFL, not particularly keen on another emancipatory act on the part of Super League, only contributed £150,000 to the company's initial budget. After the Australasian Super League abandoned its name to merge into the National Rugby League, Rugby League (Europe) was renamed as Super League (Europe) in November 1997.

== Notable events ==
=== League affairs ===
Amidst the Super League's teething issues, speculations continued regarding future reforms. The place of traditional small market teams remained a hot topic. While the idea of contracting some teams was gaining a measure of acceptance, a working party led by RFL chairman Rodney Walker suggested reducing the number of clubs at the bottom of the pyramid, while returning to a two-tier structure and enlarging the Super League to 14 or 16 clubs. This was poorly received by the game's more progressive observers due to the Super League's already palpable lack of depth, as seen during the World Club Championship. Meanwhile, a document circulated internally by Rugby League Europe discussed further streamlining the Super League by axing clubs like Castleford, Halifax and Oldham and in favor of expansion markets such as Glasgow, Leicester, South Wales or even Dublin. Caisley and RFL chief executive Maurice Lindsay strongly denied any firm commitment to this option.

Despite the funds provided by News Ltd., the greater cost of running a Super League team put many teams in the red, and the introduction of a salary cap was mooted during a meeting of executives in July. At the end of the season, the Paris Saint-Germain team, which had brought the league some of its most favorable headlines, was dissolved for failure to generate sufficient income. Relegated Oldham went into administration with more than £1 million in liabilities. The club entered voluntary liquidation in October. Its assets including its name and history were retained for a second Oldham club which entered the third tier for the 1998 season. Its chairman John Quinn called for a freeze of the relegation system, a measure that Widnes and Keighley had successfully fought to repel at the Super League's inception. The season also ended on a negative note for the RFL itself, with losses of £1 million, the governing body's first operational deficit in its 102-year history.

The tensions between chief executive Lindsay, the advocate of a perceived Super League elite, and chairman Walker, who had the favors of the rank-and-file clubs, escalated throughout the season. Lindsay became a candidate for the presidency of The Tote, inviting rumors of his departure from the sport, but ended up not being chosen. In late summer, he was also targeted by an article from tabloid The Sun, detailing more than £100,000 in personal expenses over the previous two years. Unrest was such that Murdoch's right-hand man Rob Cowley was dispatched from Australia to help pacify the situation, which actually marked the first in-person meeting with a high level News executive since the signing of the Super League agreement twenty-eight months earlier. In the run-up to the RFL's September meeting, Walker indicated his desire to curb the dominance of Lindsay's faction within the RFL, with much power concentrated into the hands of a four-man board of directors overseen by the latter. An at-large board was re-installed, to be led by a newly elected chairman, a position for which Walker ran unopposed. Shortly after, RFL project coordinator Neil Tunnicliffe was promoted to the position of deputy chief executive, working alongside Lindsay.

=== Other ===
At the end of 1996, a fan survey was organized to help chose a permanent nickname for Leeds RLFC, the last Super League member not to have one. The team had sporadically used the folk name "Loiners", but it never caught on. It subsequently became known as the Rhinos. In May, Sheffield became the first publicly traded British rugby club of either code, although the introduction was met with a lackluster response. Ownership attributed it to disappointing on-field performance, while analysts blamed it on the sport's limited profile in the city. With the advent of professional rugby union, a number of league players were now tempted back into the ranks of the fifteen-man code by lucrative winter offers. Wigan reacted by prohibiting such short-term contracts. Following dealings with a pair of unscrupulous agents, the Super League reached out to the Rugby League Professional Players' Association to join forces in the creation of a register of approved agents. Halifax attracted negative attention during a trip to the south of France (where their game against Paris had been relocated to take advantage of holiday crowds). They were accused of damaging six rooms and the swimming pool of a Béziers hotel following their loss to the French club. The RFL's Strategic Planning Commission led by technical director Joe Lydon put forward a proposal to officially recognize farm team agreements between Super League and Division One clubs, acknowledging the relationships that already existed on a case-by-case basis between Bradford and Dewsbury, as well as between Leeds and Bramley. The initiative, which would have allowed up to five players to shuttle between parent and affiliate clubs each week, was shut down by FASDA (the entity representing Division One and Division Two clubs).

== Table ==
At the end of the season, the Bradford Bulls were crowned Super League champions by virtue of finishing the season at the top of the table.

Pos	Team	Pld	W	D	L	PF	PA	PD	Pts	Relegation
1	Bradford Bulls (C)	22	20	0	2	769	397	+372	40	
2	London Broncos	22	15	3	4	616	418	+198	33	
3	St Helens	22	14	1	7	592	506	+86	29	
4	Wigan	22	14	0	8	683	398	+285	28	
5	Leeds Rhinos	22	13	1	8	544	463	+81	27	
6	Salford Reds	22	11	0	11	428	495	−67	22	
7	Halifax Blue Sox	22	8	2	12	524	549	−25	18	
8	Sheffield Eagles	22	9	0	13	415	574	−159	18	
9	Warrington Wolves	22	8	0	14	437	647	−210	16	
10	Castleford Tigers	22	5	2	15	334	515	−181	12	
11	Paris Saint-Germain	22	6	0	16	362	572	−210	12	
12	Oldham Bears (R)	22	4	1	17	461	631	−170	9	Relegated to Division One

Source: Rugby League Project
Rules for classification: 1) Points; 2) Points difference; 3) Number of points scored;
(C) Champions; (R) Relegated

== Premiership ==
During the year a secondary title, known as the Stone's Premiership, was also played for the last time. All twelve Super League teams qualified for and competed in a knockout play-off series. In the 28 September final held at Manchester's Old Trafford, Wigan Warriors beat rivals St. Helens 33–20 thanks to a Harry Sunderland Trophy-winning performance by captain Andy Farrell. Following this season, it was abolished and replaced with the Super League Grand Final which would determine the Champions rather than the current first past the post system.

== International series ==
A post-season Super League Test series between Australia and Great Britain was also held in England.

== See also ==
- 1997 World Club Championship
- 1997 Challenge Cup
