= 2001 Queensland Cup =

- Duration: March 10 – September 15, 2001
- Teams: 11
- Premiers: Toowoomba Clydesdales (2nd title)
- Minor premiers: Toowoomba Clydesdales (2nd title)
- Matches played: 116
- Points scored: 5,956
- Top points scorer(s): Greg Bourke (264)
- Player of the year: Adam Mogg
- Top try-scorer(s): Brent Webb (22)

The 2001 Queensland Cup season was the 6th season of Queensland's top-level statewide rugby league competition run by the Queensland Rugby League. The competition, known as the Bundy Gold Cup due to sponsorship from Bundaberg Rum, featured 11 teams playing a 26-week long season (including finals) from March to September.

The Toowoomba Clydesdales defeated the Redcliffe Dolphins 28–26 in the grand final at Dolphin Oval to claim their second premiership. Redcliffe fullback Adam Mogg was named the competition's Player of the Year.

== Teams ==
The number of teams in the Queensland Cup was reduced from 12 to 11 in 2001 with the withdrawal of inaugural club, the Cairns Cyclones. The Easts Tigers re-branded as the East Coast Tigers.

For the 2001 season, the Brisbane Broncos and Melbourne Storm were again affiliated with the Toowoomba Clydesdales and Norths Devils, respectively. After partnering for the 2000 season, the Auckland Warriors ended their affiliation with the Souths Magpies.

Colours	Club	Home ground(s)
	Burleigh Bears	Pizzey Park
	Central Comets	Browne Park
	East Coast Tigers	Langlands Park
	Ipswich Jets	Bendigo Bank Oval
	Logan Scorpions	Meakin Park
	Norths Devils	Bishop Park
	Redcliffe Dolphins	Dolphin Oval
	Souths Magpies	Davies Park
	Toowoomba Clydesdales	Newtown Oval, ANZ Stadium, Athletic Oval
	Wests Panthers	Purtell Park
	Wynnum Seagulls	Kougari Oval

== Ladder ==
2001 Queensland Cup
Pos	Team	Pld	W	D	L	B	PF	PA	PD	Pts
1	Toowoomba Clydesdales (P)	20	18	1	1	2	794	310	+484	41
2	Burleigh Bears	20	15	1	4	2	660	401	+259	35
3	Redcliffe Dolphins	20	14	0	6	2	617	393	+224	32
4	Norths Devils	20	11	3	6	2	558	446	+112	29
5	East Coast Tigers	20	12	0	8	2	501	450	+51	28
6	Wynnum Seagulls	20	8	3	9	2	445	546	-101	23
7	Central Comets	20	7	3	10	2	468	517	-49	21
8	Ipswich Jets	20	6	3	11	2	447	536	-89	19
9	Logan Scorpions	20	4	1	15	2	385	581	-196	13
10	Wests Panthers	20	4	1	15	2	392	798	-406	13
11	Souths Magpies	20	3	0	17	2	388	677	-289	10

== Finals series ==
Home	Score	Away	Match Information
Home	Score	Away	Date	Venue
Qualifying / Elimination finals
Norths Devils	10 – 52	East Coast Tigers	25 August 2001	Bishop Park
Burleigh Bears	8 – 40	Redcliffe Dolphins	25 August 2001	Pizzey Park
Major semi-finals
Burleigh Bears	30 – 23	East Coast Tigers	1 September 2001	Pizzey Park
Toowoomba Clydesdales	10 – 20	Redcliffe Dolphins	1 September 2001	Athletic Oval
Preliminary final
Toowoomba Clydesdales	34 – 20	Burleigh Bears	8 September 2001	Athletic Oval
Grand final
Redcliffe Dolphins	26 – 28	Toowoomba Clydesdales	15 September 2001	Dolphin Oval

Qualifying / Elimination finals
2	Burleigh	8
3	Redcliffe	40
4	Norths	10
5	East Coast	52

Major / Minor semi-finals
1	Toowoomba	10
Redcliffe	20
Burleigh	30
East Coast	23

Preliminary final
Toowoomba	34
Burleigh	20

Grand final
Redcliffe	26
Toowoomba	28

== Grand final ==
Saturday, 15 September

Redcliffe Dolphins	26 – 28	Toowoomba Clydesdales
Tries: Craig O'Dwyer 1 Luke Scott 1 Jason Webber 1 George Wilson 1 Andrew Wynyard 1 Goals: Mick Roberts 3	1st: 16 - 16; 2nd: 10 - 12; Report	Tries: 1 Tony Duggan; 1 Casey McGuire; 1 Damien Quinn; 1 Kirk Reynoldson; 1 Michael Ryan; Goals: 4 Damien Quinn

Dolphin Oval
Attendance: 7,000
Referee: Rob Alexander
Player of the Match: Ken McGuinness (Toowoomba)

Redcliffe Dolphins	Position	Toowoomba Clydesdales
Adam Mogg	FB	Ken McGuinness
George Wilson	WG	Damien Quinn
Jason Webber	CE	Steve Irwin
Phil Graham	CE	Brent Tate
Ricky Hewinson	WG	Tony Duggan
Rod West	FE	Casey McGuire
Mick Roberts	HB	Nathan Murphy
Troy Lindsay	PR	Kirk Reynoldson
Craig O'Dwyer (c)	HK	Michael Ryan
Russell Lahiff	PR	Damon Keating (c)
Luke Scott	SR	Darren Ingram
Danny Burke	SR	Paul Carige
Tony Gould	LK	Neale Wyatt
Barry Denduck	Bench	Elia Tuqiri
Stuart Cruickshank	Bench	Nathan Friend
Greg Cameron	Bench	Ben Czislowski
Andrew Wynyard	Bench	Christian Robertson
Neil Wharton	Coach	Kevin Walters

Toowoomba dominated the regular season, finishing first (winning their second minor premiership) and only losing one game. After earning a bye in the first week of the finals, they lost their second game of the season to Redcliffe in the major semi-final. This forced them into the preliminary final, where they defeated Burleigh to set up a Grand final rematch with the Dolphins, their third meeting in a grand final. Redcliffe finished the regular season in third and qualified for their third straight grand final after defeating the Clydesdales in Week 2.

=== First half ===
Redcliffe got off to the best start possible when centre Jason Webber scored inside the first minute after a Toowoomba error. Seven minutes later, Craig O'Dwyer latched onto an Adam Mogg grubber to give the Dolphins their second try. Toowoomba hit back not long after when hooker Michael Ryan scored from dummy half. The scores were then levelled when Tony Duggan dived on a loose ball in the in-goal and Damien Quinn converted from the sideline. The Clydesdales took their first lead of the match in the 35th minute when prop Kirk Reynoldson scored. The lead was short lived, as Redcliffe tied the game two minutes before the break when winger George Wilson crossed out wide.

=== Second half ===
The Dolphins came out firing after half time, scoring inside three minutes when bench forward Andrew Wynyard broke through for a try. The scoreline remained unchanged for the next 20 minutes until a Ken McGuinness cutout pass saw Quinn score in the corner. Quinn then converted his own try from the sideline to lock the score at 22-all. Redcliffe clawed ahead once again when Luke Scott scored inside the final 10 minutes, setting up a tense finish. With 30 seconds left on the clock and Toowoomba pressuring Redcliffe's try line, halfback Casey McGuire scored next to the posts to level the scores at 26-all. Quinn then stepped up to kick the simple conversion and give Toowoomba their second premiership victory. Clydesdales' fullback Ken McGuinness was named man of the match.

Five years later, Toowoomba pair Brent Tate and Casey McGuire won an NRL premiership with the Brisbane Broncos, when they defeated the Melbourne Storm in the 2006 grand final. Their Clydesdales teammate Nathan Friend was on the losing Storm side.

== Player statistics ==
=== Leading try scorers ===
Pos	Player	Team	Tries
1	Brent Webb	Wests Panthers	22
2	Phil Graham	Redcliffe Dolphins	20
3	Greg Bourke	Burleigh Bears	19
3	David Seage	Wynnum Seagulls	19
5	Justin Loomans	Central Comets	18
5	Jason Webber	Redcliffe Dolphins	18

=== Leading point scorers ===
Pos	Player	Team	T	G	FG	Pts
1	Greg Bourke	Burleigh Bears	19	94	-	264
2	Damien Quinn	Toowoomba Clydesdales	15	97	-	254
3	Damien Richters	Redcliffe Dolphins	11	76	-	198
4	John Wilshire	East Coast Tigers	17	60	-	188
5	Marty Turner	Norths Devils	12	50	1	149

== End-of-season awards ==
- Courier Mail Medal: Adam Mogg ( Redcliffe Dolphins)
- Rookie of the Year: Martin Allen ( Easts Tigers)

== See also ==
- Queensland Cup
- Queensland Rugby League
