= 2000 Queensland Cup =

- Duration: February 19 – August 19, 2000
- Teams: 12
- Premiers: Redcliffe Dolphins (2nd title)
- Minor premiers: Redcliffe Dolphins (2nd title)
- Matches played: 138
- Points scored: 6,596
- Top points scorer: Jace Van Dijk (200)
- Player of the year: Jason Bulgarelli
- Top try-scorer(s): Aaron Douglas; Brook Martin (21)

The 2000 Queensland Cup season was the 5th season of Queensland's top-level statewide rugby league competition run by the Queensland Rugby League. The competition, known as the Bundy Gold Cup due to sponsorship from Bundaberg Rum, featured 12 teams playing a 26-week long season (including finals) from February to August.

The Redcliffe Dolphins defeated the Toowoomba Clydesdales 14–6 in the grand final at Suncorp Stadium to claim their second premiership. Wests Panthers centre Jason Bulgarelli was named the competition's Player of the Year.

== Teams ==
For the first time, the competition featured the same 12 teams that participated the year before. The Central Capras re-branded as the Central Comets and changed their colour scheme to avoid confusion with the region's representative side.

For the 2000 season, the Brisbane Broncos and Melbourne Storm were again affiliated with the Toowoomba Clydesdales and Norths Devils, respectively. After using Souths Magpies and Wynnum Seagulls as feeders clubs in 1999, the Auckland Warriors used Souths as their sole feeder. The North Queensland Cowboys did not use Cairns as their affiliate club, instead using their own team in the NSWRL's First Division competition.

Colours	Club	Home ground(s)
	Burleigh Bears	Pizzey Park
	Cairns Cyclones	Barlow Park (Note: Cairns played two of their 11 home games at Barlow Park and the other nine at various venues around the Cairns region)
	Central Comets	Browne Park
	Easts Tigers	Langlands Park
	Ipswich Jets	First Provincial Oval
	Logan Scorpions	Meakin Park
	Norths Devils	Bishop Park
	Redcliffe Dolphins	Dolphin Oval
	Souths Magpies	Davies Park
	Toowoomba Clydesdales	Athletic Oval, ANZ Stadium
	Wests Panthers	Purtell Park
	Wynnum Seagulls	Kougari Oval

== Ladder ==
2000 Queensland Cup
Pos	Team	Pld	W	D	L	PF	PA	PD	Pts
1	Redcliffe Dolphins (P)	22	19	0	3	546	320	+226	38
2	Easts Tigers	22	17	0	5	654	427	+227	34
3	Toowoomba Clydesdales	22	16	0	6	747	409	+338	32
4	Burleigh Bears	22	14	1	7	600	398	+202	29
5	Norths Devils	22	13	1	8	589	484	+105	27
6	Ipswich Jets	22	12	0	10	556	516	+24	24
7	Logan Scorpions	22	10	1	11	494	488	+6	21
8	Central Comets	22	10	1	11	529	550	-21	21
9	Souths Magpies	22	8	2	12	472	624	-152	18
10	Wests Panthers	22	4	1	17	459	601	-142	9
11	Wynnum Seagulls	22	3	1	18	386	649	-263	7
12	Cairns Cyclones	22	2	0	20	288	854	-566	4

== Finals series ==
Home	Score	Away	Match Information
Home	Score	Away	Date	Venue
Minor semi-finals
Burleigh Bears	38 – 12	Norths Devils	29 July 2000	Pizzey Park
Easts Tigers	20 – 36	Toowoomba Clydesdales	30 July 2000	Langlands Park
Major semi-finals
Redcliffe Dolphins	12 – 46	Toowoomba Clydesdales	5 August 2000	Dolphin Oval
Easts Tigers	36 – 10	Burleigh Bears	6 August 2000	Langlands Park
Preliminary final
Redcliffe Dolphins	40 – 6	Easts Tigers	12 August 2000	Dolphin Oval
Grand final
Toowoomba Clydesdales	6 – 14	Redcliffe Dolphins	19 August 2000	Suncorp Stadium

Qualifying / Elimination finals
2	Easts	20
3	Toowoomba	36
4	Burleigh	38
5	Norths	12

Major / Minor semi-finals
1	Redcliffe	12
Toowoomba	46
Easts	36
Burleigh	10

Preliminary final
Redcliffe	40
Easts	6

Grand final
Toowoomba	6
Redcliffe	14

== Grand final ==
Saturday, 19 August

Toowoomba Clydesdales	6 – 14	Redcliffe Dolphins
Tries: Justin Hodges 1 Goals: Paul Warwick 1	1st: 6 - 10; 2nd: 0 - 4	Tries: 1 Trent Leis; 1 Troy Lindsay; 1 Craig O'Dwyer; Goals: 1 Damien Richters

Suncorp Stadium
Attendance: 7,280
Referee: Tony Maksoud

Toowoomba Clydesdales	Position	Redcliffe Dolphins
Justin Hodges	FB	Adam Mogg
Adam Warwick	WG	George Wilson
Brent Tate	CE	John Olzard
Alex Wilson	CE	Damien Richters
Chris Walker	WG	Trent Leis
Paul Warwick	FE	Tony Gould
Jack van Dijk	HB	Barry Denduck
Corey Parker	PR	Robert Campbell
Michael Ryan	HK	Craig O'Dwyer (c)
Damon Keating (c)	PR	Troy Lindsay
Darren Mapp	SR	Luke Scott
Neale Wyatt	SR	James Hinchey
Darren Ingram	LK	Danny Burke
Kerrod Walters	Bench	Troy Mitchell
Nathan Friend	Bench	Grant Flugge
Carl Webb	Bench	Russell Lahiff
Dennis White	Bench	Adam Starr
Ivan Henjak	Coach	Neil Wharton

Toowoomba, who finished the regular season in third, qualified for their second grand final after defeating Redcliffe in their major semi-final. Redcliffe won their second straight minor premiership and once again earned a first week bye. After losing to Toowoomba they defeated Easts by 34 points in the preliminary final to set up a 1996 grand final rematch with the Clydesdales. In the regular season, the Dolphins defeated the Clydesdales in both of their meetings.

=== First half ===
Redcliffe winger Trent Leis opened the scoring in the 16th minute when he crossed out wide. In doing so, he became the first player to score in back-to-back grand finals. Four minutes later, the Dolphins pushed their lead to eight when prop Troy Lindsay barged over the try line. Toowoomba would finally get on the board with one minute left to play in the first when Justin Hodges stepped through a number of defenders to score under the posts.

=== Second half ===
The Dolphins regained an eight-point lead four minutes into the second half when their captain Craig O'Dwyer threw a dummy close to the line and darted over. The try would be the last points scored in the game as Redcliffe held on to become the first club to win two grand finals.

Redcliffe players Adam Mogg, George Wilson, Tony Gould, Troy Lindsay, James Hinchey and Russell Lahiff became the first players to win two grand finals with the same club, having all been involved in Redcliffe's 1997 triumph. Craig O'Dwyer became the second player (after Aaron Douglas a year earlier) to win two grand finals with two different clubs, winning his first with Norths in 1998.

== Player statistics ==
=== Leading try scorers ===
Pos	Player	Team	Tries
1	Aaron Douglas	Burleigh Bears	21
1	Brook Martin	Easts Tigers	21
3	Reggie Cressbrook	Burleigh Bears	20
4	Justin Loomans	Central Comets	19
5	Chris Walker	Toowoomba Clydesdales	20

=== Leading point scorers ===
Pos	Player	Team	T	G	FG	Pts
1	Jace van Dijk	Toowoomba Clydesdales	3	94	-	200
2	Reggie Cressbrook	Burleigh Bears	20	59	-	198
3	Damien Richters	Redcliffe Dolphins	16	65	-	194
4	John Wilshire	Easts Tigers	9	67	-	170
5	Chris Lawler	Ipswich Jets	8	68	-	168

== End-of-season awards ==
- Courier Mail Medal: Jason Bulgarelli ( Wests Panthers)
- Rookie of the Year: Brook Martin ( Easts Tigers)

== See also ==
- Queensland Cup
- Queensland Rugby League
