= 1997 Queensland Cup =

- Duration: March 29 – September 6, 1997
- Teams: 14
- Premiers: Redcliffe Dolphins (1st title)
- Minor premiers: Wynnum Seagulls (1st title)
- Matches played: 135
- Points scored: 5,945
- Top points scorer: Tony Devlin (183)
- Player of the year: Alan Wieland
- Top try-scorer: Jabin Picker (25)

The 1997 Queensland Cup season was the 2nd season of top-level statewide rugby league competition in Queensland, Australia.

The competition, then known as the Channel Nine Queensland Cup for sponsorship purposes, was contested by fourteen teams over a 23-week-long season (including finals) which was eventually won by the Redcliffe Dolphins, who defeated the Easts Tigers 18–16 in the Grand Final at Suncorp Stadium.

== Teams ==
The number of teams in the Queensland Cup was reduced from 16 to 14 teams in 1997. The Burleigh Bears joined the competition, becoming the first Gold Coast-based side, while the Bundaberg Grizzlies, Mackay Sea Eagles and Sunshine Coast Falcons all withdrew.

Colours	Club	Home ground(s)
	Burleigh Bears	Pizzey Park
	Cairns Cyclones	Barlow Park
	Central Capras	Browne Park
	Easts Tigers	Langlands Park
	Ipswich Jets	North Ipswich Reserve
	Logan City Scorpions	Meakin Park
	Norths Devils	Bishop Park
	Pine Rivers Brothers	Bray Park
	Port Moresby Vipers	Lloyd Robson Oval
	Redcliffe Dolphins	Dolphin Oval
	Souths Magpies	Davies Park
	Toowoomba Clydesdales	Athletic Oval
	Wests Panthers	Purtell Park
	Wynnum Seagulls	Kougari Oval

== Ladder ==
1997 Queensland Cup
Pos	Team	Pld	W	D	L	PF	PA	PD	Pts
1	Wynnum Seagulls	18	14	1	3	498	235	+263	29
2	Redcliffe Dolphins (P)	18	14	0	4	573	271	+302	28
3	Easts Tigers	18	13	1	4	521	328	+192	27
4	Burleigh Bears	18	13	1	4	427	347	+80	27
5	Wests Panthers	18	12	2	4	468	271	+197	26
6	Central Capras	18	10	2	6	455	398	+57	22
7	Norths Devils	18	9	0	9	460	346	+114	18
8	Port Moresby Vipers	18	9	0	9	433	518	-85	18
9	Cairns Cyclones	18	7	1	10	318	352	-34	15
10	Toowoomba Clydesdales	18	6	1	11	312	354	-42	13
11	Souths Magpies	18	6	1	11	315	424	−109	13
12	Pine Rivers Brothers	18	6	0	12	391	524	-133	12
13	Ipswich Jets	18	1	1	16	276	657	−381	3
14	Logan City Scorpions	18	0	1	17	226	648	−422	1

== Finals series ==
Home	Score	Away	Match Information
Home	Score	Away	Date	Venue
Week 1 Semi-finals
Wests Panthers	38 – 10	Central Capras	9 August 1997	Purtell Park
Easts Tigers	14 – 8	Burleigh Bears	9 August 1997	Langlands Park
Wynnum Seagulls	12 – 17	Redcliffe Dolphins	11 August 1997	Kougari Oval
Week 2 Semi-finals
Burleigh Bears	8 – 14	Wests Panthers	16 August 1997	Pizzey Park
Wynnum Seagulls	8 – 14	Easts Tigers	16 August 1997	Kougari Oval
Week 3 Semi-finals
Wynnum Seagulls	6 – 12	Wests Panthers	23 August 1997	Purtell Park
Redcliffe Dolphins	18 – 14	Easts Tigers	24 August 1997	Dolphin Oval
Preliminary Final
Easts Tigers	22 – 14	Wests Panthers	30 August 1997	Langlands Park
Grand Final
Redcliffe Dolphins	18 – 16	Easts Tigers	6 September 1997	Suncorp Stadium

== Grand Final ==
Saturday, 6 September

Redcliffe Dolphins	18 – 16	Easts Tigers
Tries: James Hinchey 2 Anthony Singleton 1 Goals: Anthony Singleton 3	1st: 6 - 12; 2nd: 12 - 4	Tries: 1 Rob Braun; 1 Dale Williams; 1 Leon Yeatman; Goals: 2 Scott Sipple

Suncorp Stadium
Referee: Stuart Berndt

Redcliffe Dolphins	Position	Easts Tigers
Adam Mogg	FB	Leon Yeatman
Cameron Hurren	WG	Rob Braun
Bevan Canning	CE	Chris Beattie
George Wilson	CE	Travis Baker
Aaron Douglas	WG	Peter Turner
Anthony Singleton	FE	Scott Sipple
Peter Robinson (c)	HB	Brett McPherson
Grant Cleal	PR	Graham Cotter
Richard Ackerman	HK	Dale Williams
Troy Lindsay	PR	Scott Neilson
Ian Graham	SR	Doug Evans
James Hinchey	SR	Mark Sessarago (c)
Tony Gould	LK	Jeff Wakefield
Russell Lahiff	Bench	Phil Lockwood
Chris Essex	Bench	Steve Mills
Wayne Miller	Bench	Jamie Day
Selwyn Toby	Bench	Aaron Smith
John Boxsell	Coach	Gavin Payne

Redcliffe, who finished the season in 2nd place, qualified for their second straight Grand Final after going undefeated in the finals series. Easts, who finished 3rd, were defeated by Redcliffe in Week 3 of the finals and later qualified for the Grand Final after defeating Wests in the preliminary final. The two sides had first met in Round 13 of the regular season, with Easts running out 30-6 winners.

=== First half ===
Easts opened the scoring through fullback Leon Yeatman, who broke a number of tackles on a 20-metre run to the try line. The Tigers would soon extend their lead through hooker Dale Williams, who dummied and broke a tackle to score. Following the try, Williams and Dolphins' hooker Richard Ackerman were both sent to the sin bin. Redcliffe got on the board just before the break, after five-eighth Anthony Singleton crossed easily from dummy half.

=== Second half ===
After the intermission, an early Easts' try to winger Rob Braun extended the Tigers' lead to 10 points. With 14 minutes left to play, the Dolphins finally cracked the Tigers' defence, with second rower James Hinchey scoring out wide. With less than a minute to play and on the last tackle of the set, the Dolphins' spread it wide again to Hinchey, who scored his second try of the game and levelled the scores. After the siren had sounded, Singleton converted the try from close to the sideline to give Redcliffe their first Queensland Cup premiership.

== Player statistics ==
=== Leading try scorers ===
Pos	Player	Team	Tries
1	Jabin Picker	Wynnum Seagulls	25
2	Travis Baker	Easts Tigers	23
3	Liprin Palangat	Port Moresby Vipers	16
4	Brett Dunn	Burleigh Bears	15
4	David Maiden	Cairns Cyclones	15

=== Leading point scorers ===
Pos	Player	Team	T	G	FG	Pts
1	Tony Devlin	Wests Panthers	7	79	1	183
2	Anthony Singleton	Redcliffe Dolphins	10	66	-	172
3	Brian Hamilton	Wynnum Seagulls	9	67	-	170
4	Scott Maguire	Pine Rivers Brothers	7	57	1	143
5	Rick Stone	Burleigh Bears	2	59	-	126

== End-of-season awards ==
- Courier Mail Medal: Alan Wieland ( Wests Panthers)
- Rookie of the Year: Jason Campbell ( Wests Panthers)

== Brisbane Rugby League ==
The Queensland Rugby League also decided to continue the tradition of crowning a Brisbane club premier as was tradition since 1922. The competition, which was run as a second-tier title, started with the Brisbane teams who missed the finals, with the finalists filtering in upon their elimination from the Queensland Cup finals. This was the last year a BRL Champion was crowned, after 76 seasons of football.

Home	Score	Away	Match Information
Home	Score	Away	Date	Venue
Week 1 Qualifying Finals
Souths Magpies	31 – 10	Pine Rivers Brothers
Week 2 Qualifying Finals
Norths Devils	20 – 10	Souths Magpies
Minor Semi Final
Norths Devils	16 – 10	Wynnum Seagulls
Major Semi Final
Norths Devils	(score unknown)	Wests Panthers
Preliminary Final
Easts Tigers	22 – 16	Norths Devils
Grand Final
Redcliffe Dolphins	35 – 6	Easts Tigers		Suncorp Stadium

== See also ==
- Brisbane Rugby League
- Queensland Cup
- Queensland Rugby League
- Winfield State League
