= 1996 Queensland Cup =

- Duration: March 30 – August 31, 1996
- Teams: 16
- Premiers: Toowoomba Clydesdales (1st title)
- Minor premiers: Toowoomba Clydesdales (1st title)
- Matches played: 129
- Points scored: 4,789
- Top points scorer(s): James Brown (124)
- Player of the year: Alan Wieland
- Top try-scorer(s): Ricky Hewinson; Floyd Hill (14)

The 1996 Queensland Cup season was the 1st season of Queensland's premier statewide competition. It had been formed after the Winfield State League was closed after the end of the 1995 Season. It was subsequently superseded by the Queensland Cup. At this time it was considered as the second highest league, directly under the Brisbane Rugby League. It would run under the BRL until 1998 when it would become the highest rugby league competition in the state.

== Teams ==
The inaugural Queensland Cup season featured 16 teams, 12 from south east Queensland, two from north Queensland and one each from central Queensland and Papua New Guinea.

Colours	Club	Home ground(s)
	Bundaberg Grizzlies	Salter Oval
	Cairns Cyclones	Barlow Park
	Central Capras	Browne Park
	Easts Tigers	Langlands Park
	Ipswich Jets	North Ipswich Reserve
	Logan City Scorpions	Meakin Park
	Mackay Sea Eagles	Mackay JRL Grounds
	Norths Devils	Bishop Park
	Pine Rivers Brothers	Bray Park
	Port Moresby Vipers	Lloyd Robson Oval
	Redcliffe Dolphins	Dolphin Oval
	Souths Magpies	Davies Park
	Sunshine Coast Falcons	Kawana Sports Ground
	Toowoomba Clydesdales	Athletic Oval
	Wests Panthers	Purtell Park
	Wynnum Seagulls	Kougari Oval

== Regular season ==
The inaugural Queensland Cup consisted of 16 teams and ran for 15 regular season rounds (which included two split rounds) with a top 6 finals system.

== Ladder ==
1996 Queensland Cup
Pos	Team	Pld	W	D	L	PF	PA	PD	Pts
1	Toowoomba Clydesdales (P)	15	11	1	3	360	226	+134	23
2	Redcliffe Dolphins	15	10	2	3	365	193	+172	22
3	Souths Magpies	15	10	1	4	375	205	+170	21
4	Wests Panthers	15	10	1	4	359	208	+151	21
5	Cairns Cyclones	15	10	0	5	310	224	+86	20
6	Easts Tigers^{1}	14	9	0	5	315	224	+91	19
7	Wynnum Seagulls	15	8	2	5	325	225	+100	18
8	Pine Rivers Brothers	15	9	0	6	339	354	-15	18
9	Norths Devils	15	8	0	7	334	332	+2	16
10	Port Moresby Vipers	15	8	0	7	323	408	-85	16
11	Central Capras	15	7	0	8	309	336	−27	14
12	Mackay Sea Eagles	15	6	1	8	306	285	+21	13
13	Bundaberg Grizzlies^{1}	14	4	0	10	211	348	−137	9
14	Logan City Scorpions	15	3	2	10	236	346	−110	8
15	Sunshine Coast Falcons	15	1	0	14	184	397	−213	2
16	Ipswich Jets	15	0	0	15	138	478	−340	0

^{1}Awarded one point due to game being cancelled.

== Finals series ==
Home	Score	Away	Match Information
Home	Score	Away	Date	Venue
Week 1 Qualifying Finals
Cairns Cyclones	12 – 16	Easts Tigers	3 August 1996	Barlow Park
Souths Magpies	15 – 22	Wests Panthers	3 August 1996	Davies Park
Toowoomba Clydesdales	12 – 10	Redcliffe Dolphins	3 August 1996	Athletic Oval
Week 2 Qualifying Finals
Souths Magpies	34 – 6	Easts Tigers	10 August 1996	Davies Park
Redcliffe Dolphins	30 – 10	Wests Panthers	11 August 1996	Dolphin Oval
Semi Finals
Wests Panthers	21 – 8	Souths Magpies	17 August 1996	Purtell Park
Redcliffe Dolphins	6 – 0	Toowoomba Clydesdales	17 August 1996	Athletic Oval
Preliminary Final
Toowoomba Clydesdales	19 – 8	Wests Panthers	24 August 1996	Athletic Oval
Grand Final
Redcliffe Dolphins	6 – 8	Toowoomba Clydesdales	31 August 1996	Suncorp Stadium

== Grand Final ==
Saturday, 31 August

Redcliffe Dolphins	6 – 8	Toowoomba Clydesdales
Tries: Mark Shipway 1 Goals: Tony Gould 1	1st: 0 - 2; 2nd: 6 - 6	Tries: 1 Shaun Lawson; Goals: 2 Scott Kuhnemann

Suncorp Stadium
Attendance: 6,500
Referee: Paul Oliver

Redcliffe Dolphins	Position	Toowoomba Clydesdales
1. Barry Denduck	FB	1. Kyle Warren
2. Stephen Leyden	WG	2. Peter Stennier
3. Ricky Hewinson	CE	3. Andrew Richards
4. Mark Shipway	CE	4. Jeffery Slater
5. Aaron Douglas	WG	5. Darren Lawson
6. Tom O'Reilly	FE	6. Cameron Hamblin
7. Peter Robinson	HB	7. Damian Fry
8. Grant Cleal	PR	8. Russell Voll
9. Darren Smallhorne	HK	9. Mick Jenkins
10. Danny Nutley	PR	10. Kayne Spicer
11. Ian Graham (c)	SR	11. Scott Kuhnemann
12. Kahu Tweedie	SR	12. Tony Evans
13. Tony Gould	LK	13. Don Saunders (c)
14. Graham Cotter	Bench	14. Paul Sutton
15. James Hinchey	Bench	15. Ross Murray
16. Bevan Canning	Bench	16. Shaun Lawson
17. Cameron Hurren	Bench	17. Craig Scanlan
John Boxsell	Coach	Gary Lawrence

The inaugural Queensland Cup Grand Final featured minor premiers, the Toowoomba Clydesdales, and the second placed Redcliffe Dolphins, in what would be the fourth meeting between the two sides in 1996. The first encounter was in Round 13, with Redcliffe defeating Toowoomba 18-8 to secure the two competition points. The sides then met twice in the final series, with both matches being low-scoring, defensive battles. In the qualifying final, the Clydesdales recorded a narrow 12-10 win over the Dolphins, while two weeks later Redcliffe held on for a 6-0 victory to progress to the Grand Final.

=== First half ===
Toowoomba second-rower Scott Kuhnemann recorded the only points in the first half, kicking a penalty goal in the 21st minute. This came after Redcliffe captain Ian Graham and Toowoomba's Paul Sutton were both sin binned for fighting.

=== Second half ===
The first try of the final was eventually scored by Clydesdales' interchange player Shaun Lawson, who dummied and stepped through the Dolphins' defence to score under the posts. Redcliffe then hit back through centre Mark Shipway, who received the ball 35 metres out from the try line and sprinted around the Toowoomba defence to get his side back into the contest.

Redcliffe were then denied twice in the dying minutes by the Clydesdales' defence. Halfback Peter Robinson was stopped just before the line by Toowoomba fullback Kyle Warren, who knocked himself unconscious in the process, while Cameron Hurren had the ball knocked out of his arms, just moments later, as he went over the try line. As of 2019, the 8–6 scoreline is still the lowest ever in a Queensland Cup Grand Final.

== Player statistics ==
The following statistics are correct as of the conclusion of Round 15.

=== Leading try scorers ===
Pos	Player	Team	Tries
1	Ricky Hewinson	Redcliffe Dolphins	15
1	Floyd Hill	Souths Magpies	15
3	Robert Volu	Port Moresby Vipers	14
4	Seko Pae	Port Moresby Vipers	13
4	Robbie Schmidt	Cairns Cyclones	13

=== Leading point scorers ===
Pos	Player	Team	T	G	FG	Pts
1	James Brown	Wests Panthers	6	50	-	124
2	Ron Troutman	Wynnum Seagulls	7	45	-	118
3	Scott Maguire	Pine Rivers Brothers	4	50	1	117
4	Floyd Hill	Souths Magpies	15	28	-	116
5	Brendan Liston	Easts Tigers	3	40	-	92

== End-of-season awards ==
- Courier Mail Medal: Alan Wieland ( Wests Panthers)
- Rookie of the Year: Brendan Liston ( Easts Tigers)

== Brisbane Rugby League ==
The Queensland Rugby League also decided to continue the tradition of crowning a Brisbane club premier as was tradition since 1922. The competition, which was run as a second-tier title, started with the Brisbane teams who missed the finals, with the finalists filtering in upon their elimination from the Queensland Cup finals.

Home	Score	Away	Match Information
Home	Score	Away	Date	Venue
Week 1 Qualifying Finals
Wynnum Seagulls	28 – 22	Ipswich Jets
Norths Devils	28 – 20	Logan City Scorpions
Week 2 Qualifying Finals
Pine Rivers Brothers	28 – 4	Wynnum Seagulls
Easts Tigers^{1}	20 – 14	Norths Devils
Minor Semi Final
Pine Rivers Brothers	19 – 18	Easts Tigers^{1}
Major Semi Final
Souths Magpies	24 – 16	Pine Rivers Brothers
Preliminary Final
Souths Magpies	22 – 16	Wests Panthers
Grand Final
Redcliffe Dolphins	16 – 12	Souths Magpies		Suncorp Stadium

== See also ==
- Brisbane Rugby League
- Queensland Cup
- Queensland Rugby League
- Winfield State League
