= 1984 Winfield State League =

Rugby league in Queensland, Australia

The 1984 Winfield State League was the inaugural season of the Queensland Rugby League's statewide competition in Queensland, Australia. The competition was run similarly to the NSWRL's Amco Cup, featuring a short format prior the larger Brisbane Premiership season. The Wynnum Manly Seagulls won their first State League title with a 21-10 win over Souths in the final at Lang Park in Brisbane.

== Teams ==
A total of 14 teams competed in the inaugural season, 8 of which were BRL Premiership clubs. The remaining six were regional teams from across the state, hence the State League name.

Colours	Team	Moniker
	Easts	Tigers
	Fortitude Valley	Diehards
	Norths	Devils
	Past/Brisbane Brothers	Leprechauns
	Redcliffe	Dolphins
	Souths	Magpies
	Wests	Panthers
	Wynnum-Manly	Seagulls
	Ipswich	Jets
	North Queensland	Marlins
	Central Queensland	Capras
	Gold Coast	Vikings
	Toowoomba	Clydesdales
	Wide Bay	Bulls

== Ladder ==
Souths, Wynnum-Manly, North Queensland and Fortitude Valley made the finals from a 7-round season. North Queensland became the first country representative side to make the finals after finishing third on the table.

	Team	Pld	PA	PD	Pts
1	Souths	6	203	32	12
2	Wynnum-Manly	6	206	54	12
3	North Queensland	6	172	96	10
4	Valleys	6	129	80	10
5	Redcliffe	6	150	60	8
6	Toowoomba	6	178	95	6
7	Wests	6	110	106	6
8	Easts	6	123	100	6
9	Brothers	6	96	108	4
10	Central Queensland	6	57	196	4
11	Ipswich	6	78	170	2
12	Norths	6	58	171	2
13	Wide Bay	6	102	278	2
14	Gold Coast	6	52	166	0

== Finals ==
The finals were straight final four series held at QRL headquarters at Lang Park, with Wynnum-Manly and Souths winning their respective semi finals. In the final, the Seagulls defeated Magpies 21-10 to win the first of four straight Winfield State League titles.

Home	Score	Away	Match Information
Home	Score	Away	Date and Time	Venue	Referee	Crowd
Semi-finals
Wynnum Manly	22-0	North Queensland	20 May	Lang Park
Southern Suburbs	17-2	Fortitude Valley	20 May	Lang Park
Grand Final
Wynnum Manly	21-10	Southern Suburbs	23 May	Lang Park

== State League Final ==
1984 Winfield State League Final

23 May 1984

Wynnum-Manly Seagulls	21 – 10	Southern Suburbs
Tries: 3 G Miles 2 D Green 1 Goals: 4 W Green 4 Field goals: 1 W Lewis 1		Tries: 2; 2 G Belcher; Goals: 1; 1 M Meninga

Lang Park, Brisbane
Referee: Barry Gomersall
Player of the Match: Wally Lewis
