= George Wilson (rugby league, born 1975) =

Australian rugby league footballer

Personal information
- Born: 20 December 1975 (age 49)

Playing information
- Position: Centre, Wing
Club
Years	Team	Pld	T	G	FG	P
1996	Paris Saint-Germain	9	3	0	0	12
1999	North Qld Cowboys	1	0	0	0	0
	Total	10	3	0	0	12
- Source: As of 10 February 2020

George Wilson (born 20 December 1975) is an Australian former rugby league professional footballer who played for Paris Saint-Germain in the Super League and the North Queensland Cowboys in the National Rugby League. He primarily played centre and wing.

== Playing career ==
A Boonah junior, Wilson was contracted to the Brisbane Broncos in 1994 and 1995 but did not play first grade for the club. In 1996, he joined Paris Saint-Germain in the first season of the Super League. He played nine games, scoring three tries.

In 1997, Wilson joined the Redcliffe Dolphins in the Queensland Cup, starting at centre in their 18–16 Grand Final win over the Easts Tigers. In 1998, he was selected for the Queensland Residents while playing for the Dolphins. In 1999, Wilson joined the North Queensland Cowboys.

In Round 10 of the 1999 NRL season, he made his NRL debut, starting at centre in North Queensland's 22–26 loss to the Manly-Warringah Sea Eagles. Wilson left the club at the end of the season after spending the majority of the year playing for the Wests Panthers in the Queensland Cup. While playing for the Panthers, he was again selected in the Queensland Residents side.

In 2000, he rejoined Redcliffe and started on the wing in their 14–6 Grand Final win over the Toowoomba Clydesdales. In 2001, he started at centre and scored a try in the Dolphins' Grand Final loss to the Clydesdales. Wilson finished his Queensland Cup career with 63 tries and five goals in 90 games.

== Statistics ==
=== NRL ===
Statistics are correct to the end of the 1999 season

Season	Team	Matches	T	G	GK %	F/G	Pts
1999	North Queensland	1	0	0	—	0	0
Career totals		1	0	0	—	0	0

=== Super League ===
Season	Team	Matches	T	G	GK %	F/G	Pts
1996	Paris Saint-Germain	9	3	0	—	0	12
Career totals		9	3	0	—	0	12
