= 1985 Winfield State League =

Australian rugby league season

The 1985 Winfield State League was the inaugural season of the Queensland Rugby League's statewide competition in Queensland, Australia. The competition was run similarly to the NSWRL's Amco Cup, featuring a short format prior the larger Brisbane Premiership season. The Wynnum Manly Seagulls defeated the Brisbane Brothers in the final at Lang Park in Brisbane.

== Teams ==
A total of 14 teams competed in the inaugural season, 8 of which were BRL Premiership clubs. The remaining six were regional teams from across the state, hence the State League name.

Colours	Team	Moniker
	Easts	Tigers
	Fortitude Valley	Diehards
	Norths	Devils
	Past/Brisbane Brothers	Leprechauns
	Redcliffe	Dolphins
	Souths	Magpies
	Wests	Panthers
	Wynnum-Manly	Seagulls
	Ipswich	Jets
	North Queensland	Marlins
	Central Queensland	Capras
	Gold Coast	Vikings
	Toowoomba	Clydesdales
	Wide Bay	Bulls

== Ladder ==
Wynnum-Manly, Souths, Brothers, Easts made the finals from a six round season. Similar to the 1982 and 1983 seasons, all clubs who qualified for the finals were BRL Premiership clubs.

	Team	Pld	PA	PD	Pts
1	Wynnum-Manly	6	180	54	12
2	Souths	6	137	51	12
3	Brothers	6	141	81	8
4	Easts	6	156	111	8
5	Norths	6	91	62	8
6	Wide Bay	6	120	140	8
7	Toowoomba	6	132	126	6
8	Redcliffe	6	94	109	6
9	Valleys	6	122	79	4
10	Wests	6	70	118	4
11	Gold Coast	6	93	137	2
12	North Queensland	6	94	165	2
13	Ipswich	6	62	154	2
14	Central Queensland	6	106	211	2

== Finals ==
The finals were straight final four series held at QRL headquarters at Lang Park, with Wynnum-Manly and the Brisbane Brothers winning their respective semi finals. In the final, the Seagulls completed a 16-0 shutout of the Brothers to win their second consecutive Winfield State League title.

Home	Score	Away	Match Information
Home	Score	Away	Date and Time	Venue	Referee	Crowd
Semi-finals
Wynnum Manly	40-6	Eastern Suburbs		Lang Park
Souths Magpies	16-28	Brisbane Brothers		Lang Park
Grand Final
Wynnum Manly	16-0	Brisbane Brothers		Lang Park
