= 1986 Winfield State League =

Rugby League in Queensland

The 1986 Winfield State League was the 5th season of the Queensland Rugby League's statewide competition. The competition was run similarly to the NSWRL's Amco Cup, featuring a short format prior the larger Brisbane Premiership season. The Wynnum Manly Seagulls defeated the Redcliffe Dolphins in the final at Lang Park in Brisbane, winning their third straight title.

== Teams ==
A total of 14 teams competed in the 1986 season, 8 of which were BRL Premiership clubs. The remaining six were regional teams from across the state.

Colours	Team	Moniker
	Easts	Tigers
	Fortitude Valley	Diehards
	Norths	Devils
	Past/Brisbane Brothers	Leprechauns
	Redcliffe	Dolphins
	Souths	Magpies
	Wests	Panthers
	Wynnum-Manly	Seagulls
	Ipswich	Jets
	North Queensland	Marlins
	Central Queensland	Capras
	Gold Coast	Vikings
	Toowoomba	Clydesdales
	Wide Bay	Bulls

== Results ==
Team	1	2	3	4	5	6	F1	F2
Central Queensland Capras	IPW -6	GCV +10	RED -6	NQL -22	WYN -30	SOU -24		
Eastern Suburbs Tigers	SOU -18	NOR +20	WDB -2	WYN -26	GCV +30	WST -2		
Fortitude Valley Diehards	TOO +1	RED +10	BRO +14	WST +14	NQL +30	NOR -4	RED -8	
Gold Coast Vikings	NOR -10	CQL -10	TOO +13	IPW -16	EST -30	WYN -20		
Ipswich Jets	CQL +6	WST +9	NOR +19	GCV +16	RED -12	TOO +20	WYN -34	
Northern Suburbs Devils	GCV +10	EST -20	IPW -19	TOO -4	SOU +10	VAL +4		
North Queensland Marlins	WDB -2	BRO -14	WES -9	CQL +22	VAL -30	RED -24		
Past Brothers	WYN -12	NQL +14	VAL -14	RED -34	TOO +2	WDB +26		
Redcliffe Dolphins	WST +2	VAL -10	CQL +6	BRO +34	IPW +12	NQL +24	VAL +8	WYN -36
Southern Suburbs Magpies	EST +18	TOO -8	WYN -2	WDB +18	NOR -10	CQL +24		
Toowoomba Clydesdales	VAL -1	SOU +8	GCV -13	NOR +4	BRO -2	IPW -20		
Western Suburbs Panthers	RED -2	IPW -9	NQL +9	VAL -14	WDB 0	EST +2		
Wide Bay Bulls	NQL +2	WYN -32	EST +2	SOU -18	WES 0	BRO -26		
Wynnum-Manly Seagulls	BRO +12	WDB +32	SOU +2	EST +26	CQL +30	GCV +20	IPW +34	RED +36
Team	1	2	3	4	5	6	F1	F2

- Opponent for round listed above margin

== Ladder ==
	Team	Pld	W	D	L	PF	PA	Pd	Pts
1	Wynnum-Manly	6	6	0	0	174	52	+122	12
2	Redcliffe	6	5	0	1	148	80	+68	10
3	Valleys	6	5	0	1	117	52	+65	10
4	Ipswich	6	5	0	1	154	96	+58	10
5	Souths	6	3	0	3	120	84	+36	6
6	Brothers	6	3	0	3	94	112	-18	6
7	Norths	6	3	0	3	76	95	-19	6
8	Wests	6	2	1	4	75	89	-14	5
9	Wide Bay	6	2	1	4	82	154	-72	5
10	Easts	6	2	0	4	114	112	-2	4
11	Toowoomba	6	2	0	4	86	106	-20	4
12	North Queensland	6	1	0	5	76	133	-57	2
13	Gold Coast	6	1	0	5	97	170	-73	2
14	Central Queensland	6	1	0	5	110	188	-78	2

== Finals ==
The Seagulls would pull off a massive victory in the semi-finals against Ipswich, before defeating Redcliffe by a large margin in the Grand Final to win their third consecutive Winfield State League title.

Home	Score	Away	Match Information
Home	Score	Away	Date and Time	Venue	Referee	Crowd
Semi-finals
Wynnum Manly Seagulls	36 – 2	Ipswich Jets	18 May	Lang Park
Redcliffe Dolphins	26 – 18	Valley Diehards	18 May	Lang Park
Grand Final
Wynnum Manly Seagulls	46 – 10	Redcliffe Dolphins	20 May	Lang Park	David Manson

== State League Final ==
1986 Winfield State League Final

20 May 1986

Wynnum-Manly Seagulls	46 – 10	Redcliffe Dolphins
Tries: 9 G Miles 57', 76' 2 B Lindner 68', 79' 2 W Lewis 4' 1 G Dowling 23' 1 B Naylor 29' 1 I French 36' 1 Goals: 5 C Scott 4', 36', 57'; B Naylor 76', 79'	1st: 20 – 10; 2nd: 26 – 0	Tries: 1; 1 M Webb 8'; Goals: 3 T Benson 2', 8', 40'

Lang Park, Brisbane
Referee: David Manson
Player of the Match: Gene Miles
