= 1982 Winfield State League =

Rugby league in Queensland

The 1982 Winfield State League was the inaugural season of the Queensland Rugby League's statewide competition in Queensland, Australia. The competition was run similarly to the NSWRL's Amco Cup, featuring a short format prior the larger Brisbane Premiership season. The Eastern Suburbs Tigers won the title with a 23-15 win over Redcliffe in the final at Lang Park in Brisbane.

== Teams ==
A total of 14 teams competed in the inaugural season, 8 of which were BRL Premiership clubs. The remaining six were regional teams from across the state, hence the State League name.

Colours	Team	Moniker
	Eastern Suburbs	Tigers
	Fortitude Valley	Diehards
	Northern Suburbs	Devils
	Past Brothers Brisbane	Leprechauns
	Redcliffe	Dolphins
	Southern Suburbs	Magpies
	Western Suburbs	Panthers
	Wynnum-Manly	Seagulls
	Ipswich	Jets
	North Queensland	Marlins
	Central Queensland	Capras
	Gold Coast	Vikings
	Toowoomba	Clydesdales
	Wide Bay	Bulls

== Ladder ==
Redcliffe, Eastern Suburbs, Western Suburbs and Southern Suburbs made the finals from a 7-round season.
All 8 Brisbane clubs finished above their country counterparts on the ladder.

	Team	Pld	PA	PD	Pts
1	Redcliffe	7	151	58	12
2	Western Suburbs	7	130	58	12
3	Southern Suburbs	7	173	79	10
4	Eastern Suburbs	7	185	102	10
5	Wynnum-Manly	7	149	114	10
6	Northern Suburbs	7	144	98	9
7	Past Brothers Brisbane	7	115	80	8
8	Fortitude Valley	7	129	97	8
9	Gold Coast	7	96	106	7
10	North Queensland	7	76	119	4
11	Wide Bay	7	90	156	4
12	Toowoomba	7	77	140	2
13	Central Queensland	7	74	222	2
14	Ipswich	7	45	168	0

== Finals ==
The finals were straight final four series held at QRL headquarters at Lang Park, with Easts and Redcliffe winning their respective semi finals. In the final, the Tigers outclassed the Dolphins 23-15 to win the inaugural Winfield State League.

Home	Score	Away	Match Information
Home	Score	Away	Date and Time	Venue	Referee	Crowd
Semi-finals
Redcliffe	17-13	Southern Suburbs		Lang Park
Eastern Suburbs	13-6	Western Suburbs		Lang Park
Grand Final
Eastern Suburbs	23-15	Redcliffe		Lang Park
