= 1983 Winfield State League =

Season of Australian rugby competition

The 1983 Winfield State League was the second season of the Queensland Rugby League's statewide competition in Queensland, Australia. The competition was run similarly to the NSWRL's Amco Cup, featuring a short format prior the larger Brisbane Premiership season. Fortitude Valley won the title with a 21–12 win over Easts Tigers in the final at Lang Park in Brisbane.

== Teams ==
A total of 14 teams competed in the inaugural season, 8 of which were BRL Premiership clubs. The remaining six were regional teams from across the state, hence the State League name.

Colours	Team	Moniker
	Easts	Tigers
	Fortitude Valley	Diehards
	Norths	Devils
	Past/Brisbane Brothers	Leprechauns
	Redcliffe	Dolphins
	Souths	Magpies
	Wests	Panthers
	Wynnum-Manly	Seagulls
	Ipswich	Jets
	North Queensland	Marlins
	Central Queensland	Capras
	Gold Coast	Vikings
	Toowoomba	Clydesdales
	Wide Bay	Bulls

== Ladder ==
Easts and Valleys qualified for a one-off final from a 7-round season, while four teams, Norths, Souths, Central Queensland and Gold Coast each received a point for matches which did not take place as scheduled in round six. All 8 Brisbane clubs finished above their country counterparts on the ladder for the second year running.

	Team	Pld	PA	PD	Pts
1	Easts	7	266	48	14
2	Valleys	7	230	72	14
3	Wynnum-Manly	7	170	113	12
4	Souths	6	220	70	11
5	Norths	6	156	54	11
6	Wests	7	188	67	10
7	Brothers	7	162	103	8
8	Redcliffe	7	145	113	8
9	Toowoomba	7	82	191	4
10	Gold Coast	6	110	216	3
11	Ipswich	7	56	230	2
12	Central Queensland	6	54	236	1
13	North Queensland	7	82	211	0
14	Wide Bay	7	34	231	0

== Final ==
The one-off final was held at held at QRL headquarters at Lang Park, between the defending champions Easts and Valleys. In the final, the Tigers could not repeat their success of 1982, beaten by the Diehards 21–12.

Home	Score	Away	Match Information
Home	Score	Away	Date and Time	Venue	Referee	Crowd
Grand Final
Fortitude Valley	21-12	Eastern Suburbs		Lang Park
