= Jason Alchin =

Australian rugby league footballer

Personal information
- Full name: Jason Andrew Alchin
- Born: 17 March 1967 (age 58) Newcastle, New South Wales, Australia

Playing information
- Height: 175 cm (5 ft 9 in)
- Weight: 78 kg (12 st 4 lb)
- Position: Fullback, Halfback
Club
Years	Team	Pld	T	G	FG	P
1985–90	Canterbury Bulldogs	70	8	2	1	37
1991	St. George Dragons	3	1	0	0	4
1992–95	Western Suburbs	38	2	0	0	8
	Total	111	11	2	1	49
Representative
Years	Team	Pld	T	G	FG	P
1989–90	NSW Country	2	0	0	0	0

Jason Andrew Alchin (born 17 March 1967) is an Australian former professional rugby league footballer who primarily played as a halfback. He played for Canterbury-Bankstown, St. George and Western Suburbs in the New South Wales Rugby League (NSWRL) competition.

He is currently the coach of the Western Clydesdales in the Queensland Cup competition.

== Background ==
Alchin was born in Newcastle, New South Wales. He was selected for Australian schoolboys rugby league team while attending Toormina High School.

== Playing career ==
Alchin made his first grade debut for Canterbury against Balmain in round 18 1985. Alchin did not feature in Canterbury's premiership winning team of that year.

In 1986, Alchin only made 3 appearances and did not play in the club's grand final loss to Parramatta. In 1988, Alchin played in Canterbury's premiership winning side which defeated Balmain in the grand final which was played at the Sydney Football Stadium. Alchin departed Canterbury at the end of 1990 after making 136 appearances for the club across all grades.

In 1991, Alchin joined St George. He scored a try on debut for the club against Parramatta at Parramatta Stadium but only played 2 further games after that. In 1992, Alchin joined Western Suburbs. He played for Wests in the 1992 finals series in which they were eliminated in the first week by the Newcastle Knights.

Alchin played with Western Suburbs until the end of the 1995 season before retiring. His final game in the top grade was against Canterbury in round 17 1995 at Campbelltown Stadium.

== Coaching career ==
After retiring from playing, Alchin remained at Western Suburbs becoming the reserve grade coach under Tommy Raudonikis. He would later move into junior development roles and recruitment, returning to coaching with the Souths Logan Magpies in 2016 to coach the club's Mal Meninga Cup team.

Since 2022, Alchin has been coaching at the Western Clydesdales, initially joining the club as the Hastings Deering Colts coach in 2022, before being appointed as the club's Queensland Cup coach for the Clydesdales' inaugural season in 2023. He extended his contract with the club midway through the 2024 season.
