= Paul Sutton (rugby league) =

Australian rugby league footballer

Personal information
- Born: 18 January 1973 (age 53)

Playing information
- Position: Lock, Second-row
Club
Years	Team	Pld	T	G	FG	P
1997	South Sydney	10	1	0	0	4
- Source: RLP As of 17 December 2020

Paul Sutton (born 18 January 1973) is an Australian former professional rugby league footballer who played in the 1990s for the South Sydney Rabbitohs.

== Playing career ==
In 1996, Sutton played for the Toowoomba Clydesdales in the inaugural season of the Queensland Cup, coming off the bench in their Grand Final win over the Redcliffe Dolphins.

In 1997, he moved to the South Sydney Rabbitohs, making his first grade debut in their Round 1 loss to the Illawarra Steelers. In Round 12 of the 1997 ARL season, he scored his first try in a 28–all draw with the Steelers.
