= Emmaus College, Rockhampton =

Emmaus College

Location
- Park Avenue, Queensland; Australia; 23.3502°S 150.5220°E

Information
- Type: Secondary catholic school
- Motto: Light our way
- Established: 1993
- Principal: Marie, Martin
- Enrolment: ~ 1,760 students
- Campus: North Rockhampton
- Colours: Red, white and blue
- Website: www.emmaus.qld.edu.au

Emmaus College is a co-educational Roman Catholic secondary day school, located in Park Avenue, a suburb of Rockhampton, Queensland, Australia.

The school was established in 1991(MAH), through the amalgamation of the St Stanislaus' College, a school for boys (1958–1979), Marion College (1964–1983), a school for girls, and Emmaus Senior College, a co-educational school for years 11 and 12. The school enrols students from Year 7 to Year 12.

== History ==
Emmaus College is a culmination of a series of changes to Catholic education in Rockhampton designed, to meet the changing needs of the city and its population growth.

St. Stanislaus College opened in 1957 on a site in Main Street, where Emmaus College now stands. The college catered for boys from Year 5 to Year 10. As the enrolment grew, the Science block was built on land adjoining Marian College in Yaamba Road. Following the building of a library on the Yaamba Road site, new classrooms were constructed and the secondary department of St. Stanislaus moved to that site in 1971. The primary department remained in Main Street.

In 1981, the primary department enrolled its last Year 5 students. The final primary classes move to the Yaamba Road site in 1983, allowing the establishment of Emmaus Senior College on the Main Street site.

Marian College for Girls was established in 1964 on the present location in Yaamba Road. After the completion of the Science block and Library, the girls began co-instructional education with the boys. The step to co-education was ultimately carried out in 1984.

Emmaus Senior College was established in 1983 as a senior co-educational college for students in Years 11–12. Previously senior Catholic schooling in Rockhampton had been provided by the Range College and St. Joseph's College. The establishment of Emmaus Senior College saw these colleges become year 8–10 schools.

1991 saw the formation of The Cathedral College from the merger of the Range College and St. Joseph's CBC. Beginning as a year 8–10 college, The Cathedral College enrolled its first Year 12 class in 1993. The formation of The Cathedral College prompted the much closer identification of Emmaus College and a decision to merge these two colleges was taken. Emmaus College strives to build upon the values and traditions of Emmaus Senior College and Marian / St. Stanislaus to provide quality Catholic Education in Rockhampton.

In 2015, Emmaus College enrolled its first Year 7 students into the school. The Yaamba Road campus now consists of Year 7's to 9's, and the Main Street campus consisting of Year 10's to 12's.

== Campus ==
Emmaus College operates on two sites. Years 7 – 9 have most of their classes on Yaamba road, which has 18 regular classrooms; 24 special-use classrooms (including science rooms, manual arts rooms, performing arts rooms, computer rooms and kitchens); a library; a large oval consisting of four football fields; a pool and a large multi-purpose hall. The other site, on Main Street, mostly for Years 10 – 12, has 11 regular classrooms; 18 special-use classrooms (consisting of the same); a large library and an auditorium.

At lunch times, students are confined to their respective campus except in special circumstances, additionally, year 7's, 8's and 9's must eat in separate areas within the Yaamba road campus, although they can move around after eating. However, on Main Street campus the students are free to mingle with other grades in the same areas.

The division of one school into two campuses allows for the provision of a style of education and a way of dealing with students which best suits their development stages.

== Extracurricular activities ==
Emmaus has a large number of rugby union, rugby league, and netball teams, as well as many other sports, such as hockey, futsal, and gymkhana. The usual name for the school's teams is 'The Flame'.

Each year since 1984, the school has produced a musical stage show, with three showings at the local Pilbeam Theatre. In 2007, the production was Annie Get Your Gun Grease was Emmaus' biggest show production, breaking the box office record at the Pilbeam Theatre, with most of the shows sold out.

== Achievements and awards ==
- The school's "1st XIII" Rugby League team came 2nd at The 1998 Confraternity Shield, beaten by St Mary's College Toowoomba.
- In 2001, the team produced a top four finish at The Confraternity Shield.
- In 2007 the 1st XIII Rugby league team felt, although unlucky, very accomplished to finish 5th at the Confraternity Shield, the best finish at the competition for the school since 2001.
- In both 2004 and 2005, the school's concert and jazz band placed first and third respectively in the queensland high schools music comp.

== Notable alumni ==
- Christine Anu – Singer
- Neale Wyatt - Former Brisbane Broncos and Toowoomba Clydesdales player 2002–2005.
- Darren Fritz – Rugby League Player for the Canberra Raiders, Illawarra Steelers, North Sydney Bears and Western Suburbs Magpies from 1989–1999.
- Anthony Griffin – Former Rugby League Coach for the Brisbane Broncos, the Penrith Panthers and the St. George Illawarra Dragons.
- Sam Healy – Actor
- Sam Hoare – Rugby league player for the North Queensland Cowboys from 2014 to 2018.
- Paul Hoffmann – cricketer
- Cameron Munster – Rugby league Player for the Melbourne Storm from 2014-current.Qld Origin Player 2017–2022 and Australian player from 2017 to 2019.
- Duncan Paia'aua – Rugby Union Player for the Queensland Reds
- Rhys Wesser – Rugby league Player for the Penrith Panthers and South Sydney Rabbitohs from 1998 to 2011. Qld Origin Player 2004–2006.
