= Kevin McGuinness =

Australian rugby league footballer

Personal information
- Born: 10 November 1976 (age 49) New South Wales, Australia

Playing information
- Height: 174 cm (5 ft 9 in)
- Weight: 81 kg (12 st 11 lb)
- Position: Centre
Club
Years	Team	Pld	T	G	FG	P
1995–99	Western Suburbs	94	37	0	0	148
2000–02	Wests Tigers	55	30	1	1	123
2003	Manly Sea Eagles	16	5	0	0	20
2004–07	Salford City Reds	70	14	0	0	44
	Total	235	86	1	1	335
Representative
Years	Team	Pld	T	G	FG	P
2002	NSW City	1	1	0	0	4
- Relatives: Ken McGuinness (brother)

Kevin McGuinness (born 10 November 1976) is an Indigenous Australian former professional rugby league footballer who played in the 1990s, and 2000s. He played for Salford City Reds in the Super League, the Western Suburbs Magpies, Wests Tigers and Manly-Warringah Sea Eagles in the Australian National Rugby League (NRL) competition. His position of choice is at centre.

== Career ==
While attending Sarah Redfern High School, McGuinness played for the Australian Schoolboys team in 1995.

McGuinness was graded to Western Suburbs on 7 May 1995 when he was 18, playing from the bench against the Penrith Panthers. His older brother, Ken, was in the same side. He played two more games as a reserve, before playing as halfback in two games late in the season, both losses.

McGuinness started 1996 as a centre. In round 4, he scored his first try against the Auckland Warriors, in what was described as, "a two-try, five-star performance," as Western Suburbs won 22–8. He finished the season with 7 tries from 21 games, alternating between centre, wing and bench. He was chosen as a reserve in the qualifying final loss against Cronulla, in what was to be the club's last ever finals appearance.

Starting 1997 from the bench, McGuinness showed his versatility by playing centre, five-eighth and hooker at different times during the season. From round 10 he scored 9 tries in 10 games. In the next two years, he played in every game for the Magpies. In what were poor seasons for the club, he managed 21 tries. In 1999, he was the club's leading try-scorer.

With the Western Suburbs forming a joint venture with the Balmain Tigers for the 2000 NRL season, McGuinness was a member of the newly formed Wests Tigers. He played in all 24 games, scoring a personal best 14 tries.

At the start of 2001, McGuinness scored 5 tries in the first three games. His fortune soon changed when he, along with fellow Tiger, Craig Field, was banned by the NRL for six months after testing positive to illegal substances. After undergoing counselling, McGuinness returned to the NRL two months before the ban was lifted and was back with the first grade team for round 23 against the Newcastle Knights at Campbelltown Stadium, where he scored a try.

The Sydney Morning Herald rated McGuinness in the top 34 State of Origin eligible players in 2002, with Roy Masters claiming he was the best player at the Wests Tigers. McGuinness set the record for the most tries scored in a match by a Wests Tigers player on 4 August 2002, when he scored 4 tries against Souths.

In 2004, after a season at Manly, McGuinness moved to the Salford City Reds. While at Salford he became a firm fans' favourite, and earned the nickname "The Buddha." He left the Salford City Reds at the end of the 2007 season, and though quite a few players left at the end of that year, he in particular, received a standing ovation, with sections of the crowd chanting "Buddha, Buddha, Buddha," as a homage to the player.

After retiring from the highest level of a football, McGuiness won 2 premierships with Wollongong Wests in the Illawarra competition. In 2011, he joined the Queanbeyan Blues in Canberra's Group 8.
