= Ken McGuinness =

Australian rugby league footballer

Personal information
- Full name: Ken McGuinness
- Born: 14 September 1975 (age 50)

Playing information
- Height: 191 cm (6 ft 3 in)
- Weight: 96 kg (15 st 2 lb)
- Position: Centre, Wing, Five-eighth
Club
Years	Team	Pld	T	G	FG	P
1994–99	Western Suburbs	107	35	1	0	142
2000	Wests Tigers	6	0	0	0	0
2002	North Qld Cowboys	9	1	0	0	4
	Total	122	36	1	0	146
Representative
Years	Team	Pld	T	G	FG	P
1997–98	New South Wales	5	2	0	0	8
1995	NSW City	1	0	0	0	0
- Relatives: Kevin McGuinness (brother)

Ken McGuinness (born 14 September 1975) is an Australian former rugby league footballer who played in the 1990s and 2000s. He played club football for the Western Suburbs Magpies, Wests Tigers and North Queensland Cowboys. His position of choice was at centre and he represented for New South Wales on five occasions.

== Biography ==
McGuinness was one of nine Wests players to cross-over to the merged Magpies-Tigers club at the end of the 1999 season but he was unable to secure a regular first grade position at Wests Tigers in their inaugural year. In August 2000, McGuinness played for the excluded South Sydney Rabbitohs in two of their matches against Lebanon and the Tomahawks.

McGuinness spent 2001 in the Queensland Cup competition and played for the Toowoomba Clydesdales in the grand final that year. After nine games with the North Queensland Cowboys in 2002, McGuinness announced his retirement from first grade at the age of 26, saying he had lost his passion for the game.

During his time with the Western Suburbs, McGuinness was selected for NSW Origin on five occasions in the 1997 and 1998 series, scoring one try.

In February 2019, McGuinness was arrested and charged with the assault of a woman.
