= Jason Bulgarelli =

Italy international rugby league footballer

Personal information
- Full name: Jason Bulgarelli
- Born: 20 May 1976 (age 50) Brandon, Queensland, Australia

Playing information
- Height: 180 cm (5 ft 11 in)
- Weight: 93 kg (14 st 9 lb)
- Position: Centre
Club
Years	Team	Pld	T	G	FG	P
2003–04	Canberra Raiders	27	6	0	0	24
Representative
Years	Team	Pld	T	G	FG	P
2000–04	Italy	3	1	0	0	4

Jason Bulgarelli (born 20 May 1976) is an Australian former professional rugby league footballer who played in the 2000s. He previously played for the Canberra Raiders, winning the club's Rookie of the Year award in 2003. He primarily played in the centres.

== Playing career ==
Bulgarelli was born in Brandon, Queensland and played his junior rugby league for the Burdekin Roosters.

An Illawarra Steelers lower grader, Bulgarelli was playing with Easts Tigers in the Queensland Cup, before joining the Canberra Raiders. Bulgarelli made his NRL debut in round 10 of the 2003 season at the age of 27, and was the club's rookie of the year.

In August, 2004, he was named alongside club greats Laurie Daley and Sam Backo when the Raiders selected a side representing the all-time best Aboriginal and Torres Strait Islanders to have played for the club.

Bulgarelli was sacked from the Raiders' club in 2004 after a package he allegedly tried to collect was discovered to contain ecstasy tablets. He later returned to the Queensland Cup with the Ipswich Jets.

He had represented the Italian rugby league team

== Personal life ==
On 15 March 2019, Bulgarelli pleaded to ten charges at Townsville district court including five counts of common assault and one count of threatening violence. It was alleged back in November 2017 that Bulgarelli had assaulted his then girlfriend by hitting her on the head with the handle of a knife and then pushing the knife into her torso. Bulgarelli then said "What a time to die on your birthday". It was also alleged that on 5 December 2017, Bulgarelli pushed his ex-partner on the road and assaulted her. Bulgarelli was sentenced to two years in jail over the incidents but was set free the same day having already served 464 days in pre-sentence custody.
