= Jason Webber =

Australian rugby league footballer

Personal information
- Full name: Jason Webber
- Born: 2 March 1973 (age 52) Murgon, Queensland, Australia

Playing information
- Position: Centre
Club
| Years | Team | Pld | T | G | FG | P |
|---|---|---|---|---|---|---|
| 1997–99 | Balmain Tigers | 52 | 14 | 0 | 0 | 56 |
| 2000 | Salford City Reds | 29 | 11 | 0 | 0 | 44 |
| 2002 | Villeneuve | 2 | 0 | 0 | 0 | 0 |
| | Total | 83 | 25 | 0 | 0 | 100 |
- Source: As of 30 May 2019

Jason Webber is an Australian former professional rugby league footballer who played in the 1990s and 2000s. He played for Balmain in the Australian Rugby League and NRL competitions. Webber also played in England for Salford and in France for Villeneuve.

== Background ==
Webber was born in Murgon, Queensland, Australia.

== Playing career ==
Webber made his first grade debut for Balmain against the Gold Coast in Round 3 1997. Webber would make 12 appearances and score 3 tries for the club as they missed out on the finals by 1 competition point. Over the next 2 seasons, Webber would become a regular starter in the Balmain side at centre. Webber played for Balmain in their final year as a stand-alone entity before merging with Western Suburbs to form the Wests Tigers. Webber's final game for Balmain was in Round 22 1999 against Eastern Suburbs at Leichhardt Oval.

In 2000, Webber joined English side Salford and played one season for the club. In 2002, Webber joined French side Villeneuve before returning to Australia in 2004 and signing with Burleigh. Webber won the 2004 Queensland Cup with Burleigh before retiring.

== Post playing ==
In 2017, Webber became the coach of the Murgon Mustangs.
