= Winfield State League =

Defunct Australian rugby league

- Sport: Rugby league
- Inaugural season: 1982
- Ceased: 1995
- Replaced by: Queensland Cup
- Country: Australia
- Last premiers: Rockhampton (1995)
- Most titles: Wynnum Manly Seagulls (4 titles)

The Winfield State League was a rugby league football competition in Queensland, Australia. It was administered by the Queensland Rugby League. The competition was the QRL's parallel to the NSWRL's Amco Cup knockout and ran alongside the Brisbane Rugby League club competition. The competition was formed in 1982 and ran until 1995, after which it was superseded by the Queensland Cup.

== Formats ==
The Winfield State League was held in two different formats, with draw variances almost annually regardless of format towards the end of the tournament's run in the last 1980s and 1990s.

=== Club-based ===
In 1982 the competition involved the clubs from the Brisbane Rugby League competition playing representative teams from throughout the state over seven rounds with one or more finals being played to determine the competition winner. This format remained largely intact until 1988 when it was determined that the results of Brisbane club matches would go towards the State League instead of separate matches being played.

The club-based format was completely scrapped in 1991, but reinstated in 1993. The number of country teams competing was dramatically increased in 1993.

=== Representative-based ===
In 1991 and 1992 the competition was wholly representative-based. In the place of the Brisbane clubs were two representative teams: the Brisbane Capitals and the Brisbane Metros. Representative teams from throughout Queensland continued to compete, in addition to a team from the Northern Territory.

== Winfield State League grand final results ==
Season	Grand Final Information			Minor Premiers
Season	Premiers	Score	Runner-Up	Minor Premiers
1982	Eastern Suburbs	23–15	Redcliffe	Redcliffe
1983	Fortitude Valley	21–12	Eastern Suburbs	Eastern Suburbs
1984	Wynnum-Manly	21–10	Southern Suburbs	Southern Suburbs
1985	Wynnum-Manly	16–0	Past Brothers Brisbane	Wynnum-Manly
1986	Wynnum-Manly	46–10	Redcliffe	Wynnum-Manly
1987	Wynnum-Manly	36–14	Redcliffe	Past Brothers Brisbane
1988	Tweed Heads-Fort. Valley	26–10	Eastern Suburbs	Eastern Suburbs
1989	Eastern Suburbs	30–4	Central Queensland	Fortitude Valley
1990	Fortitude Valley	34–26	Eastern Suburbs	Fortitude Valley
1991	North Queensland (Rep.)	44–30	Central Queensland	Brisbane (Rep.) (II)
1992	Brisbane (Rep.) (I)	30–10	North Queensland (Rep.)	Brisbane (Rep.) (I)
1993	Mackay (Rep.)	18–12	Western Suburbs	N/A - Pool Format
1994	Mackay (Rep.)	34–14	Western Suburbs	N/A - Pool Format
1995	Rockhampton	26–22	Gold Coast (Rep.)	N/A - Pool Format

== Competing teams 1982–1995 ==
Team	Location/s	Year Entered	Year Departed
Brisbane Metros	Brisbane	1991	1992
Brisbane Capitals	Brisbane	1991	1992
Brisbane-Ipswich Second Division	Brisbane, Ipswich	1993	1995
Brisbane Broncos 4th XIII	Brisbane	1995	1995
Bundaberg Grizzlies	Bundaberg	1993	1995
Burdekin-Whitsunday	Ayr/Proserpine	1993	1995
Callide Valley	?	1993	1995
Cairns Cyclones	Cairns	1995	1995
Central Queensland Comets	Rockhampton	1982	1992
Central Burnett	Gayndah	1993	1995
Central Highlands	Emerald	1993	1995
Central West	Barcaldine/Winton	1993	1995
Eastern Suburbs Tigers	Brisbane	1982, 1993	1991
Gladstone Vikings	Gladstone	1993	1995
Gold Coast Vikings	Gold Coast	1982	1988
Gold Coast-Group 18	Gold Coast	1991	1995
Herbert River	?	1993	1995
Ipswich Jets	Ipswich	1982	1991, 1993
Ipswich Diggers	Ipswich	1994	1995
Logan Scorpions	Logan City	1988	1991, 1993
Mackay Sea Eagles	Mackay	1993	1995
Maryborough-Hervey Bay	Maryborough, Hervey Bay	1993	1995
Mount Isa Miners	Mount Isa	1993	1995
Northern Suburbs Devils	Brisbane	1982, 1993	1991
North Queensland Marlins	Townsville	1982	1992
Northern Districts	Agnes Water	1993	1995
Northern Territory	Darwin	1991	1993
Past Brothers	Brisbane	1982, 1993	1991
Redcliffe Dolphins	Redcliffe	1982, 1993	1991
Rockhampton Rustlers	Rockhampton	1993	1995
Seagulls-Diehards	Brisbane, Gold Coast	1988	1988
Southern Suburbs Magpies	Brisbane	1982, 1993	1991
South Burnett	Kingaroy	1993	1995
South West Mustangs	Toowoomba	1993	1995
South Queensland Crushers	Brisbane	1995	1995
Sunshine Coast Falcons	Sunshine Coast	1993	1993
Sunshine Coast-Gympie	Sunshine Coast, Gympie	1994	1995
Toowoomba Clydesdales	Toowoomba	1982	1993
Townsville Stingers	Townsville	1993	1995
Fortitude Valley Diehards	Brisbane	1982, 1988, 1993	1987, 1991
Western Suburbs Panthers	Brisbane	1982, 1993	1991
Wide Bay Bulls	Maryborough	1983	1992
Wynnum-Manly Seagulls	Brisbane	1982, 1993	1991

== Sources ==
- Winfield State League Results (via archive.org)

== See also ==
- Rugby league in Queensland
- Brisbane Rugby League
- Queensland Cup
- Queensland Rugby League
