= Damon Keating =

Australian rugby league footballer

Personal information
- Full name: Damon Keating
- Born: 25 July 1974 (age 51) Brisbane, Queensland, Australia
- Height: 185 cm (6 ft 1 in)
- Weight: 100 kg (220 lb; 15 st 10 lb)

Playing information
- Position: Prop
Club
| Years | Team | Pld | T | G | FG | P |
|---|---|---|---|---|---|---|
| 2000–01 | Brisbane Broncos | 4 | 0 | 0 | 0 | 0 |
| 2002 | Wakefield Trinity Wildcats | 24 | 1 | 0 | 0 | 4 |
| | Total | 28 | 1 | 0 | 0 | 4 |

Damon Keating (born 25 July 1974) is an Australian former rugby league footballer who played as a prop for the Brisbane Broncos in the Australian National Rugby League competition. He later moved to England to play for the Wakefield Trinity Wildcats in 2002.

== Background ==
Keating was born in Ipswich, Queensland, Australia.

== Playing career ==
While with the Brisbane Broncos, he also played for the Past Brothers in the Queensland Cup. Keating played and captained the winning Toowoomba Clydesdales in the 2001 Queensland Cup Grand Final against the Redcliffe Dolphins.
