= Andrew Wynyard =

New Zealand rugby league footballer and coach

Personal information
- Born: 14 February 1973 (age 53) New Zealand

Playing information
- Position: Second-row, Lock
Club
Years	Team	Pld	T	G	FG	P
1999–00	London Broncos	40	4	0	0	16
Representative
Years	Team	Pld	T	G	FG	P
1999	New Zealand Māori	1	0	0	0	0
- Source: RLP

Andrew Wynyard (born 14 February 1973) is a New Zealand rugby league coach and former player who played professionally in England and Australia.

== Playing career ==
He played for the Bundaberg Grizzlies in the 1998 Queensland Cup.

Wynyard started his professional career with the St. George Illawarra Dragons before being signed by the London Broncos midway through the 1999 season. That same year, Wynyard was selected to represent New Zealand Māori against Great Britain.

Between 1999 and 2000 Wynyard played 40 Super League matches for the Broncos, before returning to Australia. In 2001 Wynyard joined the Redcliffe Dolphins and went on to play 67 matches for the Dolphins in the Queensland Cup, scoring 14 tries, and being part of champion sides in 2002 and 2003. Wynyard represented the Queensland Residents in 2001.

Wynyard became the Dolphins Colts assistant coach in 2008 before coaching the FOGS Cup side in 2009.

Andrew Wynyard is currently the Head Coach for the Brighton Roosters BRL A Grade team which competes in the CAOS BRL Premier A Grade Brisbane Rugby League (2001) competition as a direct feeder team to the Redcliffe Dolphins Host Plus Cup Statewide Side.
