= Steve Irwin (rugby league) =

Australian rugby league footballer (born 1983)

Personal information
- Full name: Steven Robert Irwin
- Born: 19 June 1983 (age 43) Brisbane, Queensland, Australia
- Height: 189 cm (6 ft 2 in)
- Weight: 95 kg (14 st 13 lb)

Playing information
- Position: Fullback, Centre
Club
Years	Team	Pld	T	G	FG	P
2002–04	Brisbane Broncos	4	4	0	0	16
- Source: As of 3 February 2009

Steven Irwin (born 19 June 1983 in Queensland, Australia) is an Australian former professional rugby league footballer who played in the 2000s.

== Career ==
While attending St. Luke's Anglican School, Irwin played for the Australian Schoolboys team in 2000.

Irwin, affectionately nicknamed "Croc" after the late "Crocodile Hunter" of the same name, made a remarkable rise to first grade football in just five years. He spent much of his youth playing soccer before picking up Rugby League in 1997 at the age of 14.

In 2010, it was revealed that Irwin was playing for Bundaberg in The Queensland competition.

== Controversy ==
On 18 May 2007, Irwin was with his teammate Todd Carney when Carney decided to drive in Irwin's ute, despite Carney having been disqualified from driving at the time. Police began to pursue the vehicle in a high-speed chase through the back streets of the Canberra suburb of Bruce. After turning into a dead-end street, Carney stopped the car and fled the scene on foot, leaving Irwin in the passenger seat. Irwin told police Carney was the driver. Controversially, the Canberra club sacked Irwin over the incident (who was not charged with any offences), but retained Carney.

On 24 June 2007, Irwin lashed out at the Canberra Raiders club during a stinging interview in the Sunday Mail newspaper. He blamed Canberra for ruining his career and his reputation.
