= Travis Baker =

Australian rugby league footballer

Personal information
- Full name: Travis Baker
- Born: 15 April 1975 (age 51)

Playing information
- Position: Centre
Club
Years	Team	Pld	T	G	FG	P
1998–99	Western Suburbs	19	7	8	0	44
- Source: As of 29 December 2022

Travis Baker is an Australian former professional rugby league footballer who played in the 1990s. He played for Western Suburbs in the NRL competition.

== Playing career ==
Baker made his first grade debut for Western Suburbs in round 14 of the 1998 NRL season against the Auckland Warriors. Baker started at centre in Wests 18-16 victory. Baker made a total of 11 appearances as the club finished with the Wooden Spoon. In 1999, Baker made eight appearances including the clubs final ever game as a stand-alone entity which came against the Auckland Warriors in round 26. Baker played from the bench as Wests lost 60-16. Western Suburbs also finished the year with the wooden spoon and conceded the most points by any team in NSWRL/NRL history with 944. At the end of the year, Western Suburbs merged with fellow foundation club Balmain to form the Wests Tigers. Baker was not offered a contract to play for the new team and never played first grade again.
