= Neale Wyatt =

Australian rugby league footballer

Personal information
- Full name: Neale Wyatt
- Born: 2 February 1981 (age 45) Rockhampton, Queensland, Australia
- Height: 185 cm (6 ft 1 in)
- Weight: 98 kg (15 st 6 lb)

Playing information
- Position: Lock
Club
Years	Team	Pld	T	G	FG	P
2002–05	Brisbane Broncos	11	1	0	0	4
2008–08	Celtic Crusaders	1	0	0	0	0
	Total	12	1	0	0	4
- Source: As of 3 May 2020

Neale Wyatt (born 2 February 1981) is a former professional rugby league player who played for the Brisbane Broncos, Toowoomba Clydesdales and Celtic Crusaders.

== Early life ==
Wyatt was born in Rockhampton on 2 February 1981. He graduated from Emmaus College in 1998.

== NRL career ==
Wyatt made his debut for the Broncos in 2002. He played 11 games for the club over the next 4 years, before retiring in 2005. He also played 101 games in the Queensland Cup over this period and played lock forward in the 2001 Qld Cup Grand Final win over Redcliffe. From 2004 to 2005, Wyatt was chief executive of the Toowoomba Clydesdales. He was succeeded by Kyle Warren. As chief officer, Wyatt was noted for his attempts to expand the opportunities for local players to play for the Clydesdales.

== Post-NRL career ==
In 2001, Wyatt started as Lock Forward in the 2001 Queensland Cup Grand Final for the Toowoomba Clydesdales against the Redcliffe Dolphins. This Grand Final is regarded by many as the exciting Queensland Cup Grand Final in Queensland Cup history. Wyatt has then played for the Brisbane Broncos for the next 3 years. After retiring from the NRL, Wyatt played in the French Rugby League Championship for a year. Wyatt played one game for the Celtic Crusaders in 2008. Wyatt returned to the French Rugby League Championship in 2008 and played there until 2011, when he returned to Queensland and joined the Central Queensland Comets (now Capras). Wyatt was part of the Central Queensland Police team that won the 2012 Queensland Police Rugby League Championship, and was the public "face" and co-ordinator of the successful bid of the Kaiviti Silktails to gain entrance to the NSW Cup.

== Personal life ==
Wyatt is fluent in French, and has a nickname, “Wasp”.
