= John Olzard =

Australian rugby league footballer

Personal information
- Born: 5 May 1981 (age 45) Kingaroy, Queensland, Australia

Playing information
- Position: Wing, Centre
Club
Years	Team	Pld	T	G	FG	P
2002	South Sydney	3	1	1	0	6
2006–2007	Villefranche XIII
	Total	3	1	1	0	6

John Olzard is an Australian former professional rugby league footballer who played in the 2000s. He played for South Sydney in the NRL competition.

== Playing career ==
Olzard made his first grade debut for South Sydney in round 22 2002 against the Parramatta Eels which ended in a 54–0 loss at Parramatta Stadium. The following week, Olzard scored his first try in the top grade as Souths were defeated 58-16 by St. George at WIN Stadium.

Olzard's final game in the top grade came against Penrith in round 24 2002 at the Central Coast Stadium. At the end of the season, Souths avoided the wooden spoon after Canterbury-Bankstown were found to be guilty of breaching the NRL's salary cap and were stripped of 37 competition points.

Olzard spent the entire 2003 NRL season in Souths reserve grade team and failed to make an appearance. In 2004, Olzard joined St. George Illawarra and featured in the Rugby League World Sevens competition but suffered a serious injury before the 2004 NRL season began.

It was later revealed that Olzard had ruptured his medial, cruciate and lateral ligaments, snapping his hamstring and tearing his calf muscle from the bone. Olzard also revealed that he was lucky not to have been paralysed in his left leg due to the injury.
