= Craig O'Dwyer =

Australian rugby league footballer

Personal information
- Full name: Craig O'Dwyer

Playing information
- Position: Hooker, Halfback
Club
Years	Team	Pld	T	G	FG	P
1993	Eastern Suburbs	14	1	0	0	4
1994	Penrith	2	0	0	0	0
1995–96	South Queensland	9	1	0	0	4
	Total	25	2	0	0	8
- Source: As of 17 January 2023

Craig O'Dwyer is an Australian former professional rugby league footballer who played in the 1990s. He played for Eastern Suburbs, Penrith and South Queensland in the NSWRL/ARL competitions.

== Playing career ==
O'Dwyer made his first grade debut for Eastern Suburbs in round 3 of the 1993 NSWRL season against Western Suburbs at Campbelltown Sports Stadium. In 1994, O'Dwyer signed with Penrith but was limited to only two appearances which were both from the interchange bench. In 1995, O'Dwyer signed for the newly admitted South Queensland side and played in the clubs first ever victory which came in round 5 against North Sydney. In 1996, O'Dwyer played eight games for the club mainly at halfback as they finished with the Wooden Spoon.
