= Cairns Cyclones =

Australian rugby league team

Club information
- Full name: Cairns Cyclones Rugby League Football Club
- Colours: Green, white and gold
- Founded: 1996
- Exited: 2000

Former details
- Ground: Barlow Park (seating 1,700, standing 15,000)
- Competition: Queensland Cup
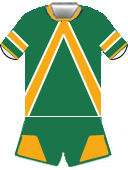
- Team colours

The Cairns Cyclones were a rugby league team that competed in the QRL Queensland Cup competition from 1996 to 2000.

== History ==
The inaugural 1996 team included the Captain/Coach and six first grade players from CDRL's Smithfield-based Ivanhoes Rugby League Club.

After a great first year in 1996 when they made the Preliminary Finals, they dropped down the ladder in subsequent seasons, finishing in last place in 2000. A lack of support from locals and other Cairns rugby league clubs, combined with increasing financial difficulties, meant the Cyclones withdrew from the Competition at the end of the 2000 season.

North Queensland was represented in the Queensland Cup from 2002-2007 by the Townsville North Queensland Young Guns, who were a feeder club to the North Queensland Cowboys. (The Queensland Cup was known as the Bundy Gold Cup from 2000-2001, the Queensland Cup from 2002-2004 and the Queensland Wizard Cup from 2005-2007).

In 2008 the rationalisation of rugby league below the NRL level meant the North Queensland Young Guns entered the NRL under 20's competition and the northern expansion of the Queensland Cup saw the establishment of a new Cairns-based QRL side, the Northern Pride.

== Staff ==
- Manager: Nigel Tillett
- Coach: Gary Smith (1996–1999, formerly CDRL Ivanhoes Knights), Brad Tessman (2000).

== Colours ==
The Cyclones' colours were traditionally green, white and gold.

== Home ground ==
The Cyclones' home ground was Barlow Park in Cairns. The playing field is 114 metres long (100 metres of field plus two 7 metre in goal areas) by 68 metres wide. The facility is floodlit for night games with four towers providing 620 lux. The venue has a capacity of 15,000 which includes 1,700 seats (mostly undercover). The car park can accommodate approximately 300 vehicles.

- 1996 season - 8 home games (won 5, lost 3)
- 1997 season - 7 home games (won 3, drew 1, lost 3)
- 1998 season - 7 home games (won 1, drew 1, lost 5)
- 1999 season - 7 home games (won 3, lost 4)
- 2000 season - home games (won, lost )

== Seasons ==
Season	Competition	P	W	D	L	F	A	+/-	Pts	Pos	Play-offs	Ref
1996	Queensland Cup	15	10	0	5	310	224	+84	20	5th	Lost in preliminary semi-final	
1997	Queensland Cup	18	7	1	10	318	352	-34	15	9th	Did not qualify	
1998	Queensland Cup	22	8	2	12	500	642	-142	18	10th	Did not qualify	
1999	Queensland Cup	22	9	1	12	494	514	-20	18	8th	Did not qualify	
2000	Queensland Cup	22	2	0	20	228	854	-566	4	12th	Wooden spoon	

== Cairns Cyclones Players (and seasons played) ==
Player	Seasons played
Aaron Port	1997
Adam Bowditch	2000
Adam Connolly	1999
Andrew Bulmer	1997
Andy Henley	1996-7
Anthony Sexton	2000
Ben Heath	1999
Ben Rauter	1999
Ben Zamatarro	1997
Boyd Lorimer	1997
Brad Coey-Braddon	2000
Brett Blennerhassett	1998
Brian Balderson	1998
Brian Fourmile	1996
Bronson Ryan	2000
Cameron McNab	1999
Chad Halliday	1999
Chad Prien	1996 & 1999
Chris Kelly	1996
Chris Muckett	1999
Chris Vanoletti	1996
Cian Jacobs	1997
Clint Arnol	2000
Clint Zammit	2000
Colin Prince	1998
Craig Cygler	1996-7
David Maiden	1996-7
Denny Lambert	1999
Duncn Naawi	1998
Fabian Della Bosca	1997
Gavin Sant	1997
Greg Burke	1999
Jaime McIntosh	1998-2000
Jason Barsley	1998 & 2000
Jason Berg	1999-2000
John Bolsem	1998
John Clifford	1996-7
John Doyle	1999
John Manning	1999
Karl Dawson	1998-2000
Kerry Amory	2000
Lama Ahmat	2000
Leigh McWilliams	1999
Leon Yeatman	1999/2000
Liam Johnson	1999
Mark Fakahua	2000
Matt Clifford	1996
Matt Hensler	1996
Michal Mahoney	1997
Mick Cooney	1999
Mick Skardon	1996-7
Nathan Butterworth	1997-8
Nathan Fein	1999
Nathan Woods	1996-7
Neil Stanley	2000
Nick Patterson	1999
Noel Haslem	1998
Noel Slade	2000
Patrick Gardner	2000
Paul Dezolt	1999
Paul Fowler	1996-7, 1999 & 2000
Paul Ketchell	1998
Paul Pensini	1999
Peter Dangerfield	1997
Peter Deaves	1996-7 & 1999
Phil Yanner	1998
Quinton Nicol	2000
Richard Murgha	1996-7
Robbie Hollingsworth	1996
Robbie Schmidt	1996-7
Rober David	1998
Scott Asimus	1999
Scott Donald	1999
Scott Mahon	1999
Scott Manns	1997
Scott Prince	1999
Scott Tronc	1996
Scott Williamson	2000
Shane Medhurst	1997-8
Shane Muspratt	1999
Shane Vivian	1997
Shannon Furber	2000
Shannon Van Balen	1996-7 & 1999
Stephen Tillett	1997
Sterling Fourmile	1998
Steve Howlett	1996
Steve Singleton	1998 & 2000
Steve Womal	1996
Steven Hepworth	1997
Swaggie Nona	1998
Tasman Van Balen	1997
Tim Kopp	2000
Troy Lorimer	1996-7
Ty Walter	2000
Ty Williams	2000
Victor Akiba	2000
Wade Backmann	1999
Wes Davies	1998
