= Michael Ryan (rugby league) =

Australian rugby league footballer

Personal information
- Full name: Michael Ryan
- Born: 9 May 1981 (age 45) Brisbane, Queensland, Australia
- Height: 168 cm (5 ft 6 in)
- Weight: 78 kg (12 st 4 lb)

Playing information
- Position: Hooker
Club
Years	Team	Pld	T	G	FG	P
2001–04	Brisbane Broncos	20	1	0	0	4
2006	Celtic Crusaders	24	21	0	0	84
	Total	44	22	0	0	88

Michael Ryan (born 9 May 1981) is an Australian former rugby league footballer who played as a hooker for the Brisbane Broncos in the Australian National Rugby League competition.

In 2006, Ryan played for Welsh club Celtic Crusaders in National League Two.

== Background ==
Ryan was born in Brisbane, Queensland, Australia.

== Career playing statistics ==
=== Point scoring summary ===
Games	Tries	Goals	F/G	Points
20	1	–	–	4

=== Matches played ===
Team	Matches	Years
Brisbane Broncos	20	2001−2004
