= James Hinchey =

Australian rugby league footballer

Personal information
- Full name: James Hinchey
- Born: 16 March 1970 (age 55)

Playing information
- Position: Second-row, Lock
Club
Years	Team	Pld	T	G	FG	P
1992	South Sydney	7	0	0	0	0
1994	Parramatta Eels	2	0	0	0	0
	Total	9	0	0	0	0
- Source: As of 15 February 2023

James Hinchey is an Australian former professional rugby league footballer who played in the 1990s. He played for South Sydney and Parramatta in the NSWRL competition.

== Playing career ==
Hinchey made his first grade debut for South Sydney in round 11 of the 1992 NSWRL season against Cronulla at Caltex Field. Hinchey would play seven games for the South Sydney club throughout the year. In 1994, Hinchey signed for Parramatta and played two games for the club, in round 11 against Cronulla and in round 12 against Manly.
