= Clive Berghofer Stadium =

Stadium in Australia

- Interactive map of Clive Berghofer Stadium
- Address: Arthur & Mary Sts, Toowoomba
- Coordinates: 27°33′33″S 151°57′58″E
- Capacity: 9,000
- Surface: Grass

Tenants
- Queensland Country (NRC) (2015); Gold Coast Titans (NRL) (2014–present); Toowoomba Clydesdales (Queensland Cup) (1919–2006, 2023-present); South West Queensland Thunder FC (since 2012)

Clive Berghofer Stadium (officially known as Toowoomba Sports Ground and previously known as Athletic Oval) is a stadium in Toowoomba, Queensland, Australia. Situated on Mary Street on the eastern fringes of Toowoomba CBD adjacent to Queens Park and Toowoomba East State School. The ticket counters and entrance are on Arthur Street behind the (east facing) grandstand.

It was renamed to reflect the home club's major sponsor, philanthropist property developer and former local Mayor Clive Berghofer. The stadium is the home ground of National Premier Leagues soccer club, the South West Queensland Thunder. The Gold Coast Titans have played pre-season games here since 2014 and in 2018 hosted the first ever National Rugby League (NRL) premiership match in Toowoomba. The stadium also plays host to rugby league, rugby union and football (soccer) and includes lights which are up to National Rugby League standard. The recently upgraded grandstand includes undercover seating for 2,300. It has the capacity to hold 9,000 people officially; however, the largest crowd is estimated to be 10,000 which occurred during a 2004 NRL pre-season game between Brisbane Broncos and Melbourne Storm. In the past, the stadium has hosted international and national rugby league matches as well as concerts and rodeos.

The stadium became the scene of controversy when indigenous activist Stephen Hagan in 1999 noticed a sign declaring the name of the E. S. "Nigger" Brown Stand, named after the 1920s rugby league player Edwin Stanley Brown who was also known as "Nigger" Brown. Hagan regarded the word "nigger" as offensive and embarked on a ten-year campaign to have the stand renamed, while those opposed to the renaming said that Brown's nickname could not be a racial slur as Brown was a fair-skinned man of European descent. While Hagan's court battles were ultimately unsuccessful, the name was not used again when the stand was demolished as part of the stadium's upgrades.

== See also ==
- Sport in Queensland
