= Queensland Cup =

Australian rugby league competition

Hostplus Queensland Cup
- Current season, competition or edition: 2026 Queensland Cup
- Formerly: Winfield State League; Channel Nine Cup; Bundy Gold Cup; QLD Wizard Cup; Intrust Super Cup
- Sport: Rugby league
- Founded: 1996
- First season: 1996
- Owner: QRL
- CEO: Bruce Hatcher
- No. of teams: 15
- Country: Australia; Papua New Guinea
- Most recent champion: Redcliffe Dolphins (2026)
- Most titles: Redcliffe Dolphins (7 titles)
- Broadcasters: Nine Network (Australia); Fox Sports (Australia); QPlus.TV
- Sponsor: Hostplus
- Level on pyramid: Level 2
- Related competitions: National Rugby League; NRL State Championship; Knock-On Effect NSW Cup
- Website: www.qrl.com.au

The Queensland Cup, currently known as the Hostplus Cup for sponsorship reasons, is the highest-level regional rugby league football competition in Queensland, Australia. It is run by the Queensland Rugby League (QRL) and is contested by fifteen teams, thirteen of which are based in Queensland, with one based in New South Wales and one in National Capital District, Papua New Guinea.

The competition is the present-day embodiment of Queensland's top-level club competition. It replaced the Winfield State League in 1996 and accompanied the Brisbane Rugby League, before becoming the premier competition in 1998, following the disbanding of the Brisbane Rugby League.

== History ==
=== Origin and establishment ===
Since its inaugural season in 1922, the Brisbane Rugby League was the premier competition in the state of Queensland. Like its counterpart, the Sydney Rugby Football League, the Brisbane Rugby League was thriving, boasting big crowds and large, loyal supporter bases with their respective clubs. The clubs were constant, with new teams rarely entering the competition. However, in 1956, when poker machines ("pokies") were introduced in New South Wales but not in Queensland, Sydney's clubs were able to recruit the best players from Brisbane, Rugby Union and overseas. Within the space of several years, the Sydney Rugby League had come to dominate the code within Australia.

In the 1980s, the NSWRFL began to further expand and supersede the Brisbane competition in popularity and media coverage. In 1982, the first clubs based outside of Sydney, the Canberra Raiders and Illawarra Steelers, were admitted. In 1988, two Queensland-based sides, the Brisbane Broncos and Gold Coast Giants, along with the Newcastle Knights, another team from regional New South Wales, were formed and gained entry into the competition. The Broncos would sign Brisbane Rugby League stars like Wally Lewis, Gene Miles and Allan Langer. In the space of one season, media coverage and match attendance for the Brisbane Rugby League dropped significantly.

=== 1996–1997: The beginning ===
In 1996, the Queensland Cup was formed, replacing the Winfield State League, as new federal government laws banned cigarette companies from sponsoring sport. Originally branded the Channel Nine Cup, the 15 round regular season competition featured sixteen teams, fifteen from Queensland and one from Papua New Guinea. The Toowoomba Clydesdales were crowned the inaugural premiers, defeating the Redcliffe Dolphins in the Grand Final. In 1997, three teams withdrew from the competition and the Burleigh Bears joined, becoming the first Gold Coast-based side.

=== 1998–2002: Premier competition ===
In 1998, the competition became the top level of rugby league in the state, following the end of the Brisbane Rugby League. Channel Nine also ended their sponsorship for the 1998 season, with competition going under name, the Queensland Cup. A sixteen-team competition returned in 1998, with the Bundaberg Grizzlies rejoining and the Gold Coast Vikings being formed.

In 1999, the Grizzlies and Vikings both left the competition, as well as inaugural club Brisbane Brothers and the Townsville Stingers, who played just one season.

In 2000, Bundaberg Rum began a two-year sponsorship of the competition and it was known as the Bundy Gold Cup. The 2000 season was also the first in which all twelve teams remained from the season prior. It would not last long though, as the Cairns Cyclones folded after the 2000 season, leaving no north Queensland representation in the competition. In 2002, the North Queensland Young Guns, a Townsville-based North Queensland Cowboys feeder club, were admitted into the competition. At the end of the 2002 season, the Logan Scorpions, an inaugural club, left the competition.

=== 2003–2006: Interstate expansion ===
In 2003, the Tweed Seagulls joined the competition, becoming the first New South Wales-based side. The club had originally applied for the 2002 season but were unsuccessful. However, following a merger of the Logan Scorpions and Souths Magpies to form the Souths Logan Magpies, a spot was opened up and Tweed were admitted. Another inaugural club would leave the competition in 2004, with the Wests Panthers exiting, and Brothers-Valleys, a merger of Past Brothers and the Fortitude Valley Diehards, joining for a single season.

In 2005, the competition became known as the Queensland Wizard Cup, after Wizard Home Loans became the major sponsor.

=== 2007: Loss of the Clydesdales ===
Although the QRL had anticipated that the same teams from 2006 would participate in the 2007 competition, it was announced on 5 December 2006 that inaugural club, the Toowoomba Clydesdales, who were the reigning minor premiers, would be withdrawing from the competition for financial reasons. Brisbane Broncos chairman Bruno Cullen said that "It didn't make sense to have this club up there running at what was looking like a $250,000 loss for the year." The following day it was announced that the Aspley Broncos would be replacing the Clydesdales, and acting as the Brisbane Broncos feeder club. The Aspley Broncos would play just a single season in the competition.

The 2007 season marked the first time a team based outside of Queensland would win the competition, with the Tweed Seagulls defeating the Redcliffe Dolphins in the Grand Final.

=== 2008–2013: Further expansion ===
2008 saw the Queensland Cup once again have teams based in the northern cities of Cairns and Mackay after absences of seven and twelve years, respectively. These new teams replaced Aspley and North Queensland as part of the rationalisation of rugby league below the NRL level caused by the introduction of the NRL under 20s competition.

In 2009, the Sunshine Coast Falcons rejoined the competition after thirteen-year absence, after signing a partnership with the Manly Sea Eagles to develop rugby league on the Sunshine Coast. The side played as the Sea Eagles and won the premiership in their first year.

In 2010, Intrust Super was announced as the new major sponsor, with the competition becoming known as the Intrust Super Cup. From 2009 to 2013, the competition featured the same twelve teams for five straight seasons.

=== 2014–2021: Papua New Guinea and Townsville return ===
In 2014, the PNG Hunters entered the competition, becoming the first Papua New Guinea based side in the competition since the Port Moresby Vipers in 1997. In their inaugural season, the side was based out of the East New Britain town of Kokopo. On 10 September 2014, QRL chairman Peter Betros announced that the Brothers Townsville-led Townsville Blackhawks bid had been successful and the side would compete in the 2015 season.

On 5 October 2014, the Northern Pride became the first Queensland Cup side to win the NRL State Championship, defeating the heavily favoured Penrith Panthers New South Wales Cup side in the inaugural final.

In 2017, the Hunters won their first Queensland Cup premiership, defeating the Sunshine Coast Falcons in the Grand Final and becoming the first team outside of Australia, and the second from outside of Queensland to win the competition.

On 27 March 2020, after round one of the season was completed, the 2020 Intrust Super Cup competition was suspended, and subsequently cancelled for the first time in its history due to the COVID-19 pandemic, with no premiers being crowned. In September 2020, the Easts Tigers were renamed as the Brisbane Tigers for the 2021 season onward. The Tigers had played under the name of Easts or Eastern Suburbs since the formation of the Queensland Cup in 1996.

=== 2022–present: Hostplus Cup and return of the Clydesdales ===
In November 2021, Hostplus became the naming rights sponsor of the competition for the 2022 season, replacing Intrust Super after the two companies had merged.

On July 17, the QRL announced that the Western Clydesdales, previously called the Toowoomba Clydesdales would (re)enter the competition for the 2023 season, becoming the competition's fifteenth team.

== Queensland Cup teams ==
The Queensland Cup consists of 15 teams, 13 from Queensland, and 1 each from National Capital District of Papua New Guinea and New South Wales, and operates on a single group system, with no divisions or conferences and no relegation and promotion from other leagues.
A number of clubs in the Queensland Cup have an affiliation with a team in the Australian national competition, the National Rugby League.

=== Current teams ===
Queensland Cup
Rugby League Club	Established	Debut*	Location	Home Venue	Titles (Last)	NRL Affiliate
Brisbane Tigers	1917	1996	(Queensland) Brisbane	Langlands Park	1 (2023)	Perth Bears
Burleigh Bears	1934	1997	(Queensland) Gold Coast	Pizzey Park	5 (2025)	Brisbane Broncos
Central Queensland Capras	1996	1996	(Queensland) Rockhampton	Browne Park	0 (None)	Dolphins
Ipswich Jets	1982	1996	(Queensland) Ipswich	North Ipswich Reserve	1 (2015)	Gold Coast Titans
Mackay Cutters	2007	2008	(Queensland) Mackay	Stadium Mackay	1 (2013)	North Queensland Cowboys
Northern Pride	2007	2008	(Queensland) Cairns	Barlow Park	2 (2014)	North Queensland Cowboys
Norths Devils	1933	1996	(Queensland) Brisbane	Bishop Park	4 (2024)	Dolphins
PNG Hunters	2013	2014	(Papua New Guinea) Port Moresby	PNG Football Stadium	1 (2017)	PNG Chiefs
Redcliffe Dolphins	1947	1996	(Queensland) Moreton Bay	Kayo Stadium	7 (2026)	Dolphins
Souths Logan Magpies	1918	2003	(Queensland) Brisbane	Davies Park	1 (2008)	Brisbane Broncos
Sunshine Coast Falcons	1996	2008	(Queensland) Sunshine Coast	Sunshine Coast Stadium	1 (2009)	Brisbane Broncos
Townsville Blackhawks	2014	2015	(Queensland) Townsville	Jack Manski Oval	0 (None)	North Queensland Cowboys
Tweed Heads Seagulls	1909	2003	(New South Wales) Tweed Heads	Piggabeen Complex	1 (2007)	Gold Coast Titans
Western Clydesdales	1919	2023	(Queensland) Toowoomba	Clive Berghofer Stadium	0 (None)	None
Wynnum Manly Seagulls	1951	1996	(Queensland) Brisbane	Kougari Oval	2 (2012)	Brisbane Broncos
* The season the team joined the competition in its current form and consecutive tenure.

=== Former teams ===
As the Queensland Cup initially began as a representative competition that took over the old Winfield State League before becoming a proper club competition, many of the following clubs were "representative" sides that either withdrew (in the case of Mackay and Bundaberg) or folded (Cairns Cyclones and Port Moresby Vipers).

Queensland Cup
Rugby League Club	Est.	First Season	Last Season	City/Town	State	Home Venue	Titles	Recent
Aspley Broncos	1967	2007	2007	Brisbane	Queensland	Bishop Park	0	-
Brisbane Brothers	1929	1996	1998	Brisbane	Queensland	Corbett Park	0	-
Brothers-Valleys	2002	2004	2004	Brisbane	Queensland	O'Callaghan Park	0	-
Bundaberg Grizzlies	1996	1996	1998	Bundaberg	Queensland	Salter Oval	0	-
Cairns Cyclones	1996	1996	2000	Cairns	Queensland	Barlow Park	0	-
Gold Coast Vikings	1982	1998	1998	Gold Coast	Queensland	Carrara Stadium	0	-
Logan Scorpions	1987	1996	2002	Logan	Queensland	Meakin Park	0	-
Mackay Sea Eagles	1996	1996	1996	Mackay	Queensland	Mackay JRL Ground	0	-
North Queensland Young Guns	2002	2002	2007	Townsville	Queensland	Dairy Farmers Stadium	1	2005
Port Moresby Vipers	1986	1996	1997	Port Moresby	(Port Moresby) N. C. District	PNG Football Stadium	0	-
Townsville Stingers	1998	1998	1998	Townsville	Queensland	Townsville Sports Reserve	0	-
Toowoomba Clydesdales	1996	1996	2006	Toowoomba	Queensland	Clive Berghofer Stadium	2	2001
Wests Panthers	1915	1996	2003	Brisbane	Queensland	Purtell Park	0	-
* Brisbane Brothers played as the Pine Rivers Brothers from 1996 to 1997. Toowoomba Clydesdales returned to the Queensland Cup as the Western Clydesdales in 2023

== Participating clubs by season ==
Channel 9 Cup
1996	Bundaberg Grizzlies		Cairns Cyclones	Central Capras	Easts Tigers		Ipswich Jets	Logan City Scorpions	Souths Magpies	Mackay Sea Eagles	Norths Devils	Pine Rivers Brothers	Port Moresby Vipers	Redcliffe Dolphins	Sunshine Coast Falcons	Toowoomba Clydesdales			Wests Panthers	Wynnum Seagulls
1997		Burleigh Bears	Cairns Cyclones	Central Capras	Easts Tigers		Ipswich Jets	Logan City Scorpions	Souths Magpies		Norths Devils	Pine Rivers Brothers	Port Moresby Vipers	Redcliffe Dolphins		Toowoomba Clydesdales			Wests Panthers	Wynnum Seagulls
Queensland Cup
1998	Bundaberg Grizzlies	Burleigh Bears	Cairns Cyclones	Central Capras	Easts Tigers	Gold Coast Vikings	Ipswich Jets	Logan Scorpions	Souths Magpies		Norths Devils	Brisbane Brothers		Redcliffe Dolphins		Toowoomba Clydesdales		Townsville Stingers	Wests Panthers	Wynnum Seagulls
1999		Burleigh Bears	Cairns Cyclones	Central Capras	Easts Tigers		Ipswich Jets	Logan Scorpions	Souths Magpies		Norths Devils			Redcliffe Dolphins		Toowoomba Clydesdales			Wests Panthers	Wynnum Seagulls
Bundy Gold Cup
2000		Burleigh Bears	Cairns Cyclones	Central Comets	Easts Tigers		Ipswich Jets	Logan Scorpions	Souths Magpies		Norths Devils			Redcliffe Dolphins		Toowoomba Clydesdales			Wests Panthers	Wynnum Seagulls
2001		Burleigh Bears		Central Comets	Easts Coast Tigers		Ipswich Jets	Logan Scorpions	Souths Magpies		Norths Devils			Redcliffe Dolphins		Toowoomba Clydesdales			Wests Panthers	Wynnum Seagulls
Queensland Cup
2002		Burleigh Bears		Central Comets	Easts Coast Tigers		Ipswich Jets	Logan Scorpions	Souths Magpies		Norths Devils			Redcliffe Dolphins		Toowoomba Clydesdales		North Queensland Young Guns	Wests Panthers	Wynnum Seagulls
2003		Burleigh Bears		Central Comets	Easts Tigers		Ipswich Jets	Souths Logan Magpies			Norths Devils			Redcliffe Dolphins		Toowoomba Clydesdales	Tweed Heads Seagulls	North Queensland Young Guns	Wests Panthers	Wynnum Seagulls
2004		Burleigh Bears		Central Comets	Easts Tigers		Ipswich Jets	Souths Logan Magpies			Norths Devils	Brothers-Valleys		Redcliffe Dolphins		Toowoomba Clydesdales	Tweed Heads Seagulls	North Queensland Young Guns		Wynnum Seagulls
QLD Wizards Cup
2005		Burleigh Bears		Central Comets	Easts Tigers		Ipswich Jets	Souths Logan Magpies			Norths Devils			Redcliffe Dolphins		Toowoomba Clydesdales	Tweed Heads Seagulls	North Queensland Young Guns		Wynnum Seagulls
2006		Burleigh Bears		Central Comets	Easts Tigers		Ipswich Jets	Souths Logan Magpies			Norths Devils			Redcliffe Dolphins		Toowoomba Clydesdales	Tweed Heads Seagulls	North Queensland Young Guns		Wynnum -Manly Seagulls
2007		Burleigh Bears		Central Comets	Easts Tigers		Ipswich Jets	Souths Logan Magpies			Norths Devils			Redcliffe Dolphins		Aspley Broncos	Tweed Heads Seagulls	North Queensland Young Guns		Wynnum -Manly Seagulls
2008		Burleigh Bears	Northern Pride	Central Comets	Easts Tigers		Ipswich Jets	Souths Logan Magpies		Mackay Cutters	Norths Devils			Redcliffe Dolphins			Tweed Heads Seagulls			Wynnum -Manly Seagulls
2009		Burleigh Bears	Northern Pride	Central Comets	Easts Tigers		Ipswich Jets	Souths Logan Magpies		Mackay Cutters	Norths Devils			Redcliffe Dolphins	Sunshine Coast Sea Eagles		Tweed Heads Seagulls			Wynnum -Manly Seagulls
Intrust Super Cup
2010		Burleigh Bears	Northern Pride	Central Comets	Easts Tigers		Ipswich Jets	Souths Logan Magpies		Mackay Cutters	Norths Devils			Redcliffe Dolphins	Sunshine Coast Sea Eagles		Tweed Heads Seagulls			Wynnum -Manly Seagulls
2011		Burleigh Bears	Northern Pride	Central Queensland Capras	Easts Tigers		Ipswich Jets	Souths Logan Magpies		Mackay Cutters	Norths Devils			Redcliffe Dolphins	Sunshine Coast Sea Eagles		Tweed Heads Seagulls			Wynnum -Manly Seagulls
2012		Burleigh Bears	Northern Pride	Central Queensland Capras	Easts Tigers		Ipswich Jets	Souths Logan Magpies		Mackay Cutters	Norths Devils		Papua New Guinea Hunters	Redcliffe Dolphins	Sunshine Coast Falcons		Tweed Heads Seagulls			Wynnum -Manly Seagulls
2013		Burleigh Bears	Northern Pride	Central Queensland Capras	Easts Tigers		Ipswich Jets	Souths Logan Magpies		Mackay Cutters	Norths Devils		Papua New Guinea Hunters	Redcliffe Dolphins	Sunshine Coast Falcons		Tweed Heads Seagulls	Townsville Blackhawks		Wynnum -Manly Seagulls
2014		Burleigh Bears	Northern Pride	Central Queensland Capras	Easts Tigers		Ipswich Jets	Souths Logan Magpies		Mackay Cutters	Norths Devils		Papua New Guinea Hunters	Redcliffe Dolphins	Sunshine Coast Falcons		Tweed Heads Seagulls	Townsville Blackhawks		Wynnum -Manly Seagulls
2015		Burleigh Bears	Northern Pride	Central Queensland Capras	Easts Tigers		Ipswich Jets	Souths Logan Magpies		Mackay Cutters	Norths Devils		Papua New Guinea Hunters	Redcliffe Dolphins	Sunshine Coast Falcons		Tweed Heads Seagulls	Townsville Blackhawks		Wynnum -Manly Seagulls
2016		Burleigh Bears	Northern Pride	Central Queensland Capras	Easts Tigers		Ipswich Jets	Souths Logan Magpies		Mackay Cutters	Norths Devils		Papua New Guinea Hunters	Redcliffe Dolphins	Sunshine Coast Falcons		Tweed Heads Seagulls	Townsville Blackhawks		Wynnum -Manly Seagulls
2017		Burleigh Bears	Northern Pride	Central Queensland Capras	Easts Tigers		Ipswich Jets	Souths Logan Magpies		Mackay Cutters	Norths Devils		Papua New Guinea Hunters	Redcliffe Dolphins	Sunshine Coast Falcons		Tweed Heads Seagulls	Townsville Blackhawks		Wynnum -Manly Seagulls
2018		Burleigh Bears	Northern Pride	Central Queensland Capras	Easts Tigers		Ipswich Jets	Souths Logan Magpies		Mackay Cutters	Norths Devils		Papua New Guinea Hunters	Redcliffe Dolphins	Sunshine Coast Falcons		Tweed Heads Seagulls	Townsville Blackhawks		Wynnum -Manly Seagulls
2019		Burleigh Bears	Northern Pride	Central Queensland Capras	Easts Tigers		Ipswich Jets	Souths Logan Magpies		Mackay Cutters	Norths Devils		Papua New Guinea Hunters	Redcliffe Dolphins	Sunshine Coast Falcons		Tweed Heads Seagulls	Townsville Blackhawks		Wynnum -Manly Seagulls
2020		Burleigh Bears	Northern Pride	Central Queensland Capras	Easts Tigers		Ipswich Jets	Souths Logan Magpies		Mackay Cutters	Norths Devils		Papua New Guinea Hunters	Redcliffe Dolphins	Sunshine Coast Falcons		Tweed Heads Seagulls	Townsville Blackhawks		Wynnum -Manly Seagulls
2021		Burleigh Bears	Northern Pride	Central Queensland Capras	Brisbane Tigers		Ipswich Jets	Souths Logan Magpies		Mackay Cutters	Norths Devils		Papua New Guinea Hunters	Redcliffe Dolphins	Sunshine Coast Falcons		Tweed Heads Seagulls	Townsville Blackhawks		Wynnum -Manly Seagulls
Hostplus Cup
2022		Burleigh Bears	Northern Pride	Central Queensland Capras	Brisbane Tigers		Ipswich Jets	Souths Logan Magpies		Mackay Cutters	Norths Devils		PNG Hunters	Redcliffe Dolphins	Sunshine Coast Falcons		Tweed Heads Seagulls	Townsville Blackhawks		Wynnum -Manly Seagulls
2023		Burleigh Bears	Northern Pride	Central Queensland Capras	Brisbane Tigers		Ipswich Jets	Souths Logan Magpies		Mackay Cutters	Norths Devils		PNG Hunters	Redcliffe Dolphins	Sunshine Coast Falcons	Western Clydesdales	Tweed Heads Seagulls	Townsville Blackhawks		Wynnum -Manly Seagulls
2024		Burleigh Bears	Northern Pride	Central Queensland Capras	Brisbane Tigers		Ipswich Jets	Souths Logan Magpies		Mackay Cutters	Norths Devils		PNG Hunters	Redcliffe Dolphins	Sunshine Coast Falcons	Western Clydesdales	Tweed Heads Seagulls	Townsville Blackhawks		Wynnum -Manly Seagulls

== Season structure ==
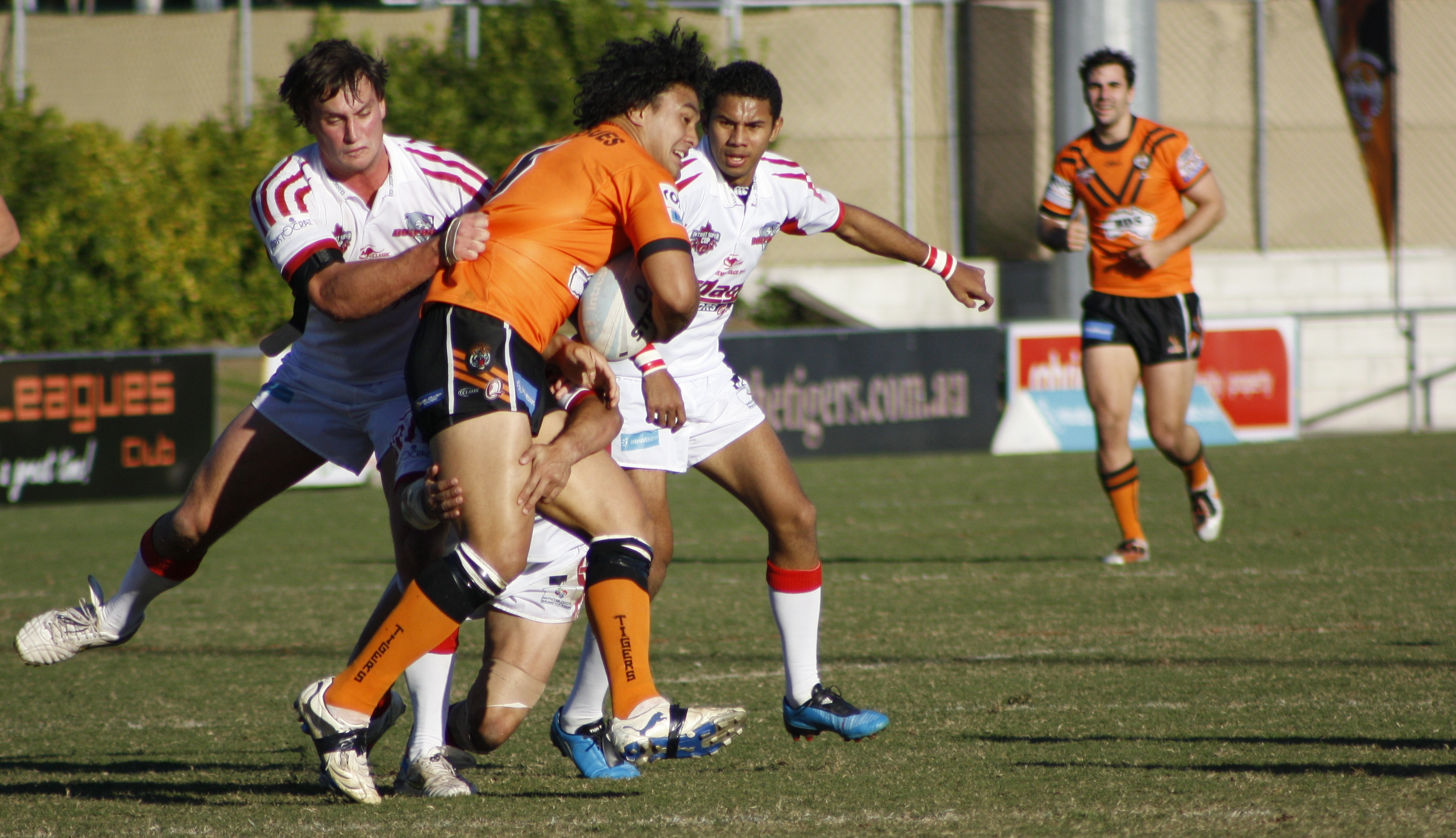
An Easts Tigers player tackled by the Redcliffe Dolphins at Langlands Park

=== Pre-season ===
The Queensland Cup pre-season typically begins in February and ends in early March. Clubs generally use this time to organise trial matches to test playing combinations. Usually, Queensland Cup teams will play each other in trials, while some face National Rugby League (NRL) sides. For example, in 2018, the Brisbane Broncos played trial matches against the Central Queensland Capras and PNG Hunters.

=== Regular season ===
The Queensland Cup regular season usually begins in early March and runs until late August. A round of regular season games is played every weekend for twenty-four weeks. In most rounds, matches are played on Saturday nights/afternoons and Sunday afternoons. Each team receives one bye during the regular season.

The regular season also features a number of themed rounds, where proceeds from the games go to various charities. In 2018, these rounds included ANZAC Round, Indigenous Round, Men of League Round, Women in League Round, "Turn to Me" Round and the annual Country Week.

==== Country Week ====
Queensland Cup teams based and located outside South East Queensland

The Queensland Cup has the largest regional footprint of any professional sporting code in Queensland, hosting regular season and trial matches over a large geographical footprint.

In Round 20, 2011 the Souths Logan Magpies game against the Northern Pride was relocated from the Magpies home ground in Brisbane to Yusia Ginau Oval, Bamaga on Cape York. The game attracted 2000 spectators, and was so successful that the following year QRL in partnership with the Queensland Government introduced the 'Country Week' concept and took matches to regional Queensland, country towns and cities, to engage fans at a grassroots level. This round usually takes place in July.

Locations which have hosted Country Week games include:

- 2012: Blackwater, Kilcoy, Moranbah, Mount Isa
- 2013: Roma, Toowoomba, Whitsundays, Woodford, Yarrabah
- 2014: Emerald, Longreach, Mareeba, Moranbah, Kingaroy, Kokopo (East New Britain Province)
- 2015: Blackall, Bundaberg, Charters Towers, Dalby, Innisfail, Stanthorpe
- 2016: Barcaldine, Charleville, Gympie, Moranbah, Mount Isa, Ravenshoe
- 2017: Bamaga, Clermont, Julia Creek, Mundubbera, Winton, St George
- 2018: Bowen, Cooktown, Goondiwindi, Hughenden, Lae (M. P.), Maryborough, Normanton
- 2019: Ilfracombe, Ingham, Nanango, Pittsworth, Thursday Island
- 2020: Country Week was cancelled due to the COVID-19 pandemic
- 2021: Atherton, Chinchilla, Dysart, Gladstone, Murgon, Quilpie, Richmond
- 2022: Ayr, Cunnamulla, Monto, Roma, Sarina, Springsure, Thursday Island
- 2023: Biloela, Kilcoy, Miles, Proserpine, Stanthorpe, Weipa, Wondai

In addition to this round games have also been played in regional locations during regular rounds in:

- Atherton, Queensland, Australia (Northern Pride v Burleigh Bears, 2016; Northern Pride v Townsville Blackhawks, 2018)
- Bamaga, Queensland, Australia (Souths Logan v Northern Pride, 2011)
- Barcaldine, Queensland, Australia
- Bundaberg, Queensland, Australia
- Chinchilla, Queensland, Australia
- Emerald, Queensland, Australia
- Gladstone, Queensland, Australia
- Hervey Bay, Queensland, Australia
- Innisfail, Queensland, Australia (Northern Pride v Wynnum Manly, 2022)
- Lae, Morobe Province, Papua New Guinea
- Mareeba, Queensland, Australia
- North Stradbroke Island, Queensland, Australia
- Tully, Queensland, Australia (Northern Pride v Sunshine Coast, 2023)
- Woorabinda, Queensland, Australia
- Warwick, Queensland, Australia

=== Finals Series ===
The eight highest placed teams at the end of the regular season compete in the finals series. The system consists of a number of games between the top eight teams over four weeks in September, until only two teams remain. These two teams then contest the Grand Final, which is usually played in late September. Over the years, the Queensland Cup has used a number of different finals series systems, usually involving five to six and now eight teams. In 2019, the current eight team final series system will be adopted.

==== Grand Final ====
The Queensland Cup Grand Final, which determines the season's premiers, is one of the state's major sporting events. Suncorp Stadium has hosted the greatest number of Grand Finals, having been held there between 1996 – 2001, 2004 – 2007, 2010 – 2012 and 2014 – 2018. It has been held at Dolphin Stadium annually since 2019, however it hosted Grand Finals between 2001 and 2003. Other venues to host Queensland Cup Grand Finals include North Ipswich Reserve (2008, 2013) and Sunshine Coast Stadium (2009).

Traditionally, the Grand Final had been played on Saturday afternoons. However, they have been played on Sunday afternoons beginning in 2010, with the exception of the 2022, 2025 and 2026 Grand Finals.

Since 2007, the player judged to be the man-of-the-match is awarded the prestigious Duncan Hall Medal.

== Premiership winners ==
Season	Grand Finals				Minor Premiers	
Season	Premiers	Score	Runners-up	Venue	Premiers	Points
1996	**Toowoomba Clydesdales** (1st title)	8 – 6	Redcliffe Dolphins	Suncorp Stadium	Toowoomba Clydesdales	23
1997	**Redcliffe Dolphins** (1st)	18 – 16	Easts Tigers	Suncorp Stadium	Wynnum Manly Seagulls	29
1998	**Norths Devils** (1st)	35 – 16	Wests Panthers	Suncorp Stadium	Norths Devils	33
1999	**Burleigh Bears** (1st)	12 – 10	Redcliffe Dolphins	Suncorp Stadium	Redcliffe Dolphins	35
2000	**Redcliffe Dolphins** (2nd)	14 – 6	Toowoomba Clydesdales	Suncorp Stadium	Redcliffe Dolphins	38
2001	**Toowoomba Clydesdales** (2nd)	28 – 26	Redcliffe Dolphins	Dolphin Oval	Toowoomba Clydesdales	41
2002	**Redcliffe Dolphins** (3rd)	34 – 10	Ipswich Jets	Dolphin Oval	Redcliffe Dolphins	36
2003	**Redcliffe Dolphins** (4th)	31 – 18	Burleigh Bears	Dolphin Oval	Burleigh Bears	33
2004	**Burleigh Bears** (2nd)	22 – 18	Easts Tigers	Suncorp Stadium	Burleigh Bears	34
2005	**North Queensland Young Guns** (1st)	36 – 6	Burleigh Bears	Suncorp Stadium	North Queensland Young Guns	33
2006	**Redcliffe Dolphins** (5th)	27 – 6	Toowoomba Clydesdales	Suncorp Stadium	Toowoomba Clydesdales	32
2007	**Tweed Seagulls** (1st)	28 – 18	Redcliffe Dolphins	Suncorp Stadium	North Queensland Young Guns	34
2008	**Souths Logan Magpies** (1st)	24 – 18	Ipswich Jets	North Ipswich Reserve	Ipswich Jets	36
2009	**Sunshine Coast Sea Eagles** (1st)	32 – 18	Northern Queensland Pride	Stockland Park	Souths Logan Magpies	32
2010	**Northern Queensland Pride** (1st)	30 – 20	Norths Devils	Suncorp Stadium	Souths Logan Magpies	34
2011	**Wynnum Manly Seagulls** (1st)	16 – 10	Tweed Seagulls	Suncorp Stadium	Tweed Seagulls	41
2012	**Wynnum Manly Seagulls** (2nd)	20 – 10	Redcliffe Dolphins	Suncorp Stadium	Redcliffe Dolphins	34
2013	**Mackay Cutters** (1st)	27 – 20	Easts Tigers	North Ipswich Reserve	Northern Queensland Pride	38
2014	**Northern Queensland Pride** (2nd)	36 – 4	Easts Tigers	Suncorp Stadium	Northern Queensland Pride	44
2015	**Ipswich Jets** (1st)	32 – 20	Townsville Blackhawks	Suncorp Stadium	Townsville Blackhawks	43
2016	**Burleigh Bears** (3rd)	26 – 16	Redcliffe Dolphins	Suncorp Stadium	Redcliffe Dolphins	40
2017	**PNG Hunters** (1st)	12 – 10	Sunshine Coast Falcons	Suncorp Stadium	PNG Hunters	39
2018	**Redcliffe Dolphins** (6th)	36 – 22	Easts Tigers	Suncorp Stadium	Redcliffe Dolphins	35
2019	**Burleigh Bears** (4th)	28 – 10	Wynnum Manly Seagulls	Dolphin Stadium	Sunshine Coast Falcons	43
2020	Season was initially suspended after round 1 and was then cancelled due to the COVID-19 pandemic in Australia.					
2021	**Norths Devils** (2nd)	16 – 10	Wynnum Manly Seagulls	Moreton Daily Stadium	Norths Devils	30
2022	**Norths Devils** (3rd)	16 – 10	Redcliffe Dolphins	Moreton Daily Stadium	Burleigh Bears	31
2023	**Brisbane Tigers** (1st)	22 – 18	Burleigh Bears	Kayo Stadium	Burleigh Bears	35
2024	**Norths Devils** (4th)	34 – 20	Redcliffe Dolphins	Kayo Stadium	Northern Pride	40
2025	**Burleigh Bears** (5th)	22 – 8	Norths Devils	Kayo Stadium	Burleigh Bears	37
2026	**Redcliffe Dolphins** (7th)	28 – 18	Sunshine Coast Falcons	Kayo Stadium	Sunshine Coast Falcons	38

=== Number of premiership wins ===
- Team names in bold are the teams currently playing in the Queensland Cup

	Club	Premierships	Years won	Runners-up	Years runners-up	Minor Premierships	Years won
1	**Redcliffe Dolphins**	7	1997, 2000, 2002, 2003, 2006, 2018, 2026	8	1996, 1999, 2001, 2007, 2012, 2016, 2022, 2024	6	1999, 2000, 2002, 2012, 2016, 2018
2	**Burleigh Bears**	5	1999, 2004, 2016, 2019, 2025	3	2003, 2005, 2023	5	2003, 2004, 2022, 2023, 2025
3	**Norths Devils**	4	1998, 2021, 2022, 2024	2	2010, 2025	2	1998, 2021
4	**Western Clydesdales** (Note: Toowoomba Clydesdales withdrew from the Queensland Cup after 2006 and returned as Western Clydesdales in 2023.)	2	1996, 2001	2	2000, 2006	3	1996, 2001, 2006
5	**Northern Pride**	2	2010, 2014	1	2009	3	2013, 2014, 2024
6	**Wynnum Manly Seagulls**	2	2011, 2012	2	2019, 2021	1	1997
7	North Queensland Young Guns	1	2005, 2007	0	—	2	2005, 2007
8	**Tweed Heads Seagulls**	1	2007	1	2011	1	2011
9	**Souths Logan Magpies**	1	2008	0	—	2	2009, 2010
10	**Sunshine Coast Falcons**	1	2009 (Note: Then known as the Sunshine Coast Sea Eagles.)	2	2017, 2026	2	2019, 2026
11	**Mackay Cutters**	1	2013	0	—	0	—
12	**Ipswich Jets**	1	2015	2	2002, 2008	1	2008
13	**PNG Hunters**	1	2017	0	—	1	2017
14	**Brisbane Tigers**	1	2023	5	1997, 2004, 2013, 2014, 2018	0	—
15	**Townsville Blackhawks**	0	—	1	2015	1	2015
16	Wests Panthers	0	—	1	1998	0	—

== NRL State Championship ==
Since 2014, The NSW Cup Grand Final has been played on the same weekend as the Queensland Cup Grand Final, the weekend prior to the NRL Grand Final, allowing for the creation of the NRL State Championship which saw the two competition premiers face off as a curtain raiser to the NRL Grand Final. The match originally followed the NRL Under-20s Grand Final from 2014 to 2017, and in 2018 followed the NRL Women's Grand Final.

In 2019 however, the NRL State Championship was the first of three grand finals played on the day, preceding both the NRL Women's Grand Final and NRL Grand Final, with the exception of 2020 and 2021 when the NRL State Championship match was cancelled due to COVID-19. The Northern Pride and Ipswich Jets became the first two QRL teams to win the State Championship with the next six championships won by the NSWRL premiers. The Norths Devils would break the streak, winning the 2024 match against the Newtown Jets.

=== Champions: Queensland Cup ===
- Northern Pride (2014)
- Ipswich Jets (2015)
- Norths Devils (2024)
- Redcliffe Dolphins (2026)

=== NRL State Championship winners ===
NRL Season	NRL State Championship				Player of the Match
NRL Season	Winners	Score	Runners-up	Venue	Player of the Match
2014	Northern Pride	32–28	Penrith Panthers	Stadium Australia	Javid Bowen
2015	Ipswich Jets	26–12	Newcastle Knights	Stadium Australia	Matt Parcell
2016	Illawarra Cutters	54–12	Burleigh Bears	Stadium Australia	Drew Hutchison
2017	Penrith Panthers	42–18	PNG Hunters	Stadium Australia	Kaide Ellis
2018	Canterbury-Bankstown Bulldogs	42–18	Redcliffe Dolphins	Stadium Australia	Josh Cleeland
2019	Newtown Jets	20–16	Burleigh Bears	Stadium Australia	Toby Rudolf
2020	Match was cancelled due to the COVID-19 pandemic lockdown in Australia.				
2021	Match was cancelled due to the COVID-19 pandemic lockdown in New South Wales.				
2022	Penrith Panthers	44–10	Norths Devils	Stadium Australia	J'maine Hopgood
2023	South Sydney Rabbitohs	42–22	Brisbane Tigers	Stadium Australia	Tyrone Munro
2024	Norths Devils	20–18	Newtown Jets	Stadium Australia	Oryn Keeley
2025	NZ Warriors	50–20	Burleigh Bears	Stadium Australia	Tanah Boyd
2026	Redcliffe Dolphins	68–14	Penrith Panthers	Stadium Australia	Jake Averillo

== Honours ==
At the end of each season at the QRL presentation night, the Petero Civoniceva Medal is awarded to the Queensland Cup player voted as the best and fairest over the entire season. Formerly known as The Courier Mail Medal, in 2018, the medal was renamed after former Australian and Queensland representative Petero Civoniceva. After each game, the referees award three votes to the best player, two votes to the second-best player, and one vote to the third-best player. Previous winners include Australia and Queensland representatives Greg Inglis and Daly Cherry-Evans.

Since 2007, the man of the match in the Grand Final has been awarded the Duncan Hall Medal. The medal is named in honour of ARL Team of the Century member Duncan Hall, who played 24 games for Queensland and 22 games for Australia between 1948 and 1955. Past recipients include Tony Williams and Jake Granville, who would go onto win NRL premierships shortly after their Queensland Cup success.

=== 20th Year Anniversary Team ===
On 21 September 2015, the QRL announced their Queensland Cup 20th Year Anniversary team. The 17-man team was chosen by a selection panel consisting of Brad Tallon (Queensland Rugby League statistician), Steve Ricketts (rugby league journalist), David Wright (former ABC commentator) and Mike Higgison (rugby league historian).

To be eligible for selection, a player must've played a minimum of 75 games in the competition. Rick Stone, who coached the Burleigh Bears from 1997 to 2005 (winning two premierships), was named coach of the side, while longtime referee Tony Maksoud was included as referee of the team.

No.	Name	Club(s)	Years	Games	Tries	Goals	Points
1.	Ryan Cullen	Central Queensland, Redcliffe, Easts	2003–10	154	112	0	449
2.	Nathanael Barnes	Tweed Heads, Wynnum Manly	2003–07, 2011–13, 2015–17	186	135	41	622
3.	Reggie Cressbrook	Townsville, Burleigh, Ipswich	1998–06	143	89	366	1,089
4.	Donald Malone	Toowoomba, Easts, Ipswich, Mackay, Sunshine Coast	2004–17	179	119	138	752
5.	Heath Egglestone	Central Queensland	1996–04	150	99	1	398
6.	Brad Davis (captain)	Tweed Heads	2005–12	154	23	483	1,066
7.	Shane Perry	Brothers, Logan, Redcliffe, Norths	1996–98, 2002–11	218	95	6	409
8.	Troy Lindsay	Redcliffe	1996–09	270	17	6	80
9.	Mick Roberts	Redcliffe, Norths	1998–11	253	71	134	555
10.	Shane O'Flanagan	Wests, Burleigh	1997–08	210	33	0	132
11.	Danny Burke	Brothers, Redcliffe	1998, 2000–09	219	26	0	104
12.	Sime Busby	Central Queensland, Easts	1997–03	118	15	1	62
13.	Danny Coburn	Ipswich	1998–10	258	32	0	128
14.	Luke Scott	Souths, Townsville, Redcliffe	1996, 1998–03	129	36	0	144
15.	Luke Dalziel-Don	Wynnum Manly	2004, 2006–13	173	82	0	329
16.	Nick Parfitt	Toowoomba, Burleigh	2003–11	173	113	483	1,421
17.	Phil Dennis	Wests, Easts, Souths Logan	2003–18	282	29	7	130
* Statistics are correct to the end of the 2018 season

== Records ==
The following records are taken from the QRL's official website and are correct as of the end of the 2019 season.

=== Team ===
- Most premierships – 7 Redcliffe Dolphins
- Most minor premierships – 6 Redcliffe Dolphins
- Most wooden spoons – 5 Central Queensland Capras
- Highest score in a game – 98, Toowoomba against Western Suburbs Panthers (2003)
- Longest winning streak – 17 matches, Northern Pride (2010–2011)
- Longest undefeated streak – 22 matches, Tweed Seagulls (2010–2011)
- Longest losing streak – 36 matches, Sunshine Coast Falcons (2013–2014)

=== Individual ===
- Most games – Phil Dennis, 282 games
- Most tries – Daniel Ogden, 155 tries
- Most points – Nick Parfitt 1,421 points (113 tries, 483 goals)
- Most points in a season 318, Liam Georgetown (2013)
- Most tries in a season 34, Daniel Kennedy 2004
- Most points in a game 40, Damien Richter 2002, Greg Bourke 2002
- Most tries in a game 7, Chris Walker 2000, Anthony Zipf 2004

== Media coverage & Sponsorship ==
Although the Queensland Cup has never had the same amount of media coverage that the pre-Brisbane Broncos Brisbane Rugby League did, in recent years it has experienced a resurgence in interest from both the Queensland media and from casual fans alike.

=== Television ===
In 2018, the match of the round was televised live on the Nine Network in Queensland at 1:00pm (AEST) on Saturdays. Previously, the match of the round had been broadcast by Nine on Sunday afternoons and before that, on ABC Television on Saturday afternoons. The match is later replayed during the week on Foxtel's Fox League channel. The match of the round returned to Sunday afternoons for the 2019 season.

The non-broadcast games are recorded for highlights and judiciary and coaching purposes.

=== Radio ===
From 2006 to 2013, community broadcaster Bay FM began broadcasting matches of the Wynnum Manly Seagulls with commentators Mike Higgison and Troy Robbins.

In 2015, a group of community broadcasters including Switch 1197, Valley FM Esk and Phoenix Radio Ipswich began broadcasting matches featuring the Ipswich Jets.

=== Online ===
Starting from 2022 Queensland Rugby League announced a new streaming deal with Cluch.tv under the website name Qplus.TV where fan can subscribe to watch every game live.

=== Sponsorship ===
Due to sponsorship, the Queensland Cup has gone under many different names since first being held in 1996. Originally known as the Channel Nine Cup, it has been known as the Hostplus Cup since 2022.

- Channel Nine Cup (1996–1997)
- Bundy Rum Gold Cup (2000–2001)
- Wizard Cup (2005–2008)
- Intrust Super Cup (2010–2021)
- Hostplus Cup (2022–present)

== See also ==
- Hastings Deering Colts
- FOGS Cup and FOGS Colts Challenge
- Brisbane Rugby League premiership
- Queensland Rugby League
- Winfield State League
- NSW Cup
