= Gold Coast Vikings =

Defunct Australian rugby league club, based in Gold Coast QLD

Club information
- Full name: Gold Coast Vikings Rugby League Football Club
- Nickname: Vikings
- Short name: The Vikings
- Colours: Green; Gold; White
- Founded: 1982; 44 years ago
- Exited: 1998; 28 years ago

Former details
- Ground: Owen Park (17,000) Carrara Stadium (20,000)

The Gold Coast Vikings was a rugby league team representing the Gold Coast Rugby League Competition, where the best players of the competition get selected to play for the Vikings.

They used to compete in the Queensland State League (from 1982) and the Queensland Cup (1998) competitions. Although originally a representative team, the Vikings became a feeder club for the Gold Coast Chargers National Rugby League team, and were withdrawn from the Queensland Cup when the Chargers were withdrawn from the NRL.

== Results ==
=== Amco Cup ===
- 1978: Second Round

=== Queensland Cup ===
- 1998: Semi-finalists

=== Queensland State League ===
- 1995: Runners-up
- 1994: Semi-finalists
- 1993: Knocked out in preliminary rounds
- 1992: 5th
- 1991: 6th
- 1988: 13th
- 1987: 8th
- 1986: 13th
- 1985: 11th
- 1984: 14th
- 1983: 10th
- 1982: 9th
