= Western Clydesdales =

Australian rugby league club, based in Toowoomba, QLD

Club information
- Full name: Western Clydesdales RLFC (founded as Toowoomba Clydesdales RLFC)
- Colours: Sky Blue Dark Blue; Red Gold
- Founded: 1919; 107 years ago
- Exited: 2006; 20 years ago
- Readmitted: 2023; 3 years ago
- Website: https://www.westernclydesdales.com.au/home/

details
- Ground: Clive Berghofer Stadium (9000)
- CEO: Alex Pagonis
- Coach: Ben Walker and Shane Walker
- Captain: Darryn Schonig & Emry Pere
- Competition: Queensland Cup
- Wooden spoons: 1 (2024)
- Premierships (2nd grade): 1 (2001)
- Runners-up (2nd grade): 2 (2000, 2006)
- Premierships (3rd grade): 1 (1996)

The Western Clydesdales (formerly Toowoomba Clydesdales) are a rugby league football club based in Toowoomba, Queensland, Australia. The Clydesdales originally played in the Queensland Cup from the competition's inception in 1996 until 2006, and were the feeder club for the Brisbane Broncos between 1999 and 2006. They re-entered the Queensland Cup in 2023 as the Western Clydesdales.

== History ==
=== "Galloping Clydesdales" ===
Historically, the Clydesdales were the representative team for the Toowoomba Rugby League competition. They competed in the Bulimba Cup between 1925 and 1972, winning on sixteen occasions. In 1924, the team defeated England, New Zealand, Brisbane, Ipswich, the New South Wales state side and New South Wales Rugby Football League premiership holders, South Sydney. The win against the English touring side was noteworthy as it was the first time England had ever lost to a provincial side. The team, with a large number of incumbent Australian and Queensland players, was coined the "Galloping Clydesdales".

Players to represent Australia while playing for the Clydesdales include Herb Steinohrt, Duncan Thompson, Tom Gorman, Mick Masden, Dan Dempsey and Duncan Hall.

=== Winfield State League (1982-1995) ===
In 1982, the Clydesdales joined the Winfield State League. They were eliminated in the semi-final stage in the 1987, 1988, 1989, 1992, 1993 and 1995 seasons. During the 1992 season, Toowoomba was renamed the South-West Division.

=== Queensland Cup (1996-2006) ===
Toowoomba played in the inaugural season of the Queensland Cup in 1996, finishing as minor premiers. They claimed their first premiership with a 8–6 win against the Redcliffe Dolphins at Lang Park. The next two seasons were not as successful, with Toowoomba dropping to 15th place in the 1998 Queensland Cup regular season.

The former Toowoomba Clydesdales logo

The Clydesdales formed a feeder club arrangement with the Brisbane Broncos ahead of the 1999 Queensland Cup season, which saw fringe and up-and-coming players from the NRL club turn out for Toowoomba in the Queensland Cup. The Clydesdales were the competition's big improvers as they finished in fourth place and were ultimately eliminated by the defending premiers, Norths Devils.

The following season, 2000, resulted in Toowoomba finishing third and qualifying for their second Queensland Cup grand final, beating Redcliffe 46–12 in the major semi-final. The Dolphins would gain their revenge in the grand final, defeating the Clydesdales 14–6.

2001 saw the Queensland Cup return to Toowoomba, as the Clydesdales finished minor premiers with just one loss and one draw all season. In a reverse of the previous year's finals, the Redcliffe Dolphins defeated Toowoomba in the major semi-final to advance directly to the grand final. Toowoomba were able to overcome the Burleigh Bears in the preliminary final, before facing Redcliffe in a rematch of the previous year's grand final. Halfback Casey McGuire scored the winning try inside the last minute of the game, giving the Clydesdales a famous 28–26 victory.

Toowoomba would miss the finals during the next two seasons, before returning to the finals in 2004 and 2005, but were eliminated by the Wynnum-Manly Seagulls and Redcliffe Dolphins respectively, each game in extra time.

The Clydesdales would return to the minor premiership of the Queensland Cup in 2006. They would once again ultimately face the Redcliffe Dolphins in the grand final. After scoring the first try of the game, the Clydesdales would eventually lose 6-27.

The Broncos wound up the feeder club arrangement with the Clydesdales in December 2006, resulting in Toowoomba withdrawing from the Queensland Cup. With the creation of the Townsville Blackhawks in 2015, Toowoomba would be the largest regional centre without a Queensland Cup side.

=== Return to Queensland Cup (2023) ===
In July 2022, the Queensland Rugby League announced the Clydesdales would return to the Queensland Cup for the 2023 season. The bid to return a Toowoomba team to the Queensland Cup initially planned to call the team the Western Mustangs after the existing junior representative team. But in August 2021 it was announced the team, if readmitted, would be named the Western Clydesdales in order to represent both the western Queensland and Toowoomba elements of the club. The Clydesdales announced a partnership with the Canterbury-Bankstown Bulldogs, whereby the NRL club would establish an academy servicing Toowoomba and south-west Queensland and integrate with Clydesdales coaching staff on and off the field.

Former Bulldogs NRL player Jason Alchin was named as the head coach of the Western Clydesdales for the 2023 season.

In September 2025, it was announced Ben Walker and Shane Walker would take over the Head Coaching role in 2026 of the Clydesdales. The Walker Brothers will bring a local feel to the Clydesdales being both products of St Mary's College in Toowoomba.

== Notable players ==
Many Australian and Queensland representatives have played for Toowoomba during their career.

- Adrian Vowles
- Ben Ikin
- Berrick Barnes
- Brad Meyers
- Carl Webb
- Dan Stains
- Dane Carlaw
- David Taylor
- Denan Kemp
- Don Saunders
- Duncan Thompson
- Edwin Brown
- Herb Steinohrt
- Justin Hodges
- Kyle Warren
- Laurie Blake
- Lote Tuqiri
- Luke Priddis
- Michael Hancock
- Michael Ryan
- Mick Madsen
- Nathan Friend
- Neale Wyatt
- Paul Green
- Paul Morgan
- Sam Thaiday
