= 2009 Parramatta Eels season =

Australia Rugby League Parramatta Eels 2009 season

- NRL Rank: 8th
- Play-off result: Runners-up (Lost 16–23 vs Melbourne Storm, Grand Final*)
- World Club Challenge: DNQ
- 2009 record: Wins: 12; draws: 1; losses: 11
- Points scored: For: 476; against: 473

Team information
- CEO: Denis Fitzgerald; Paul Osborne
- Coach: (Australia) Daniel Anderson
- Captain: (New Zealand) Nathan Cayless
- Stadium: Parramatta Stadium (Capacity: 20,741); ANZ Stadium (Capacity: 83,500)
- Avg. attendance: 13,127 (Home); 16,734 (Home & Away); 50,946 (Finals Series)
- Agg. attendance: 157,524 (Home); 401,626 (Home & Away); 203,785 (Finals Series)
- High attendance: 74,549 (25 September vs Canterbury-Bankstown Bulldogs, 1st Preliminary Final)

Top scorers
- Tries: (Australia) Luke Burt (17)
- Goals: (Australia) Luke Burt (91)
- Points: (Australia) Luke Burt (217)
← 2008	List of seasons	2010 →

The 2009 Parramatta Eels season was the 63rd in the club's history. They competed in the NRL's 2009 Telstra Premiership, just making the finals by finishing 8th (out of 16). The Eels then continued their winning streak into the play-offs, reaching the 2009 NRL grand final which they lost to the Melbourne Storm.

== Summary ==
Under new coach Daniel Anderson, Parramatta had an indifferent start to the season which saw the release of star halfback Brett Finch. After 18 rounds and incredibly inconsistent form, the Parramatta Eels had won only five games and were sitting third-last and were in direct contention for the dreaded 2009 NRL Wooden Spoon. TAB SportsBet had the Eels as $151 outsiders to win the NRL Premiership.

Though beginning in Round 19, upset victories against the Melbourne Storm and the Canterbury-Bankstown Bulldogs set the platform for an unexpected 10 wins from the next 11 games, which propelled the Eels into the Top 8 and consequently, premiership contention. This unanticipated winning streak was directly attributed by many sporting experts including Rugby League legend Andrew Johns to the spectacular run of form of star fullback Jarryd Hayne. Winning the award for man-of-the-match in every game from Round 19–24, and again in the first week of the finals, Hayne was described as "the best player in any code of football in Australia" by premiership-winning coach Phil Gould. Following his astonishing string of 7-man-of-the-match performances, Hayne won the award for Dally M Fullback of the Year and was crowned the best and fairest player in the game, winning the Dally M Medal for 2009.

After a seven-game winning streak, the Eels succumbed to a heavy defeat to the minor premiers St. George Illawarra, however they returned to Kogarah in Week 1 of the 2009 NRL Finals Series and defeated the Dragons 25–12 featuring an impressive late game try by Dally M medal winner Jarryd Hayne. Following successive wins against the Gold Coast Titans (a team that Parramatta had never beaten before), 27–2 at SFS and Canterbury, 22–12 in front of a record-breaking non-Grand Final crowd of 74,549 at ANZ stadium, Parramatta qualified for their first Grand Final since 2001, becoming the first 8th-placed team to ever qualify for a Grand Final. On 4 October 2009, the Parramatta Eels played the deciding game of NRL, against the Melbourne Storm at ANZ Stadium in front of a crowd of 82,538. The Eels lost the match 23–16, ending what critics called "the Parramatta Fairytale".

On 22 April 2010, the Melbourne Storm were stripped of the premiership as a result of long-term gross salary cap breaches disclosed by the NRL. However, the premiership for 2009 was not handed over to the Parramatta Eels, instead remaining vacant.

Mid-season the Parramatta club had a change of CEO, Denis Fitzgerald was replaced by Paul Osborne. Fullback Jarryd Hayne was the only Eels player selected to play in the 2009 State of Origin series.

== Standings ==
=== National Rugby League ===
2009 NRL season
Pos	Team	Pld	W	D	L	B	PF	PA	PD	Pts
1	St. George Illawarra Dragons	24	17	0	7	2	548	329	+219	38
2	Canterbury-Bankstown Bulldogs	24	18	0	6	2	575	428	+147	38^{1}
3	Gold Coast Titans	24	16	0	8	2	514	467	+47	36
4	Melbourne Storm	24	14	1	9	2	505	348	+157	33
5	Manly-Warringah Sea Eagles	24	14	0	10	2	549	459	+90	32
6	Brisbane Broncos	24	14	0	10	2	511	566	−55	32
7	Newcastle Knights	24	13	0	11	2	508	491	+17	30
8	Parramatta Eels	24	12	1	11	2	476	473	+3	29
9	Wests Tigers	24	12	0	12	2	558	483	+75	28
10	South Sydney Rabbitohs	24	11	1	12	2	566	549	+17	27
11	Penrith Panthers	24	11	1	12	2	515	589	−74	27
12	North Queensland Cowboys	24	11	0	13	2	558	474	+84	26
13	Canberra Raiders	24	9	0	15	2	489	520	−31	22
14	New Zealand Warriors	24	7	2	15	2	377	565	−188	20
15	Cronulla-Sutherland Sharks	24	5	0	19	2	359	568	−209	14
16	Sydney Roosters	24	5	0	19	2	382	681	−299	14

^{1} The Bulldogs were deducted 2 competition points after an interchange breach in Round 2.

=== National Youth Competition ===
National Youth Competition season 2009
Pos	Team	Pld	W	D	L	B	PF	PA	PD	Pts
1	Manly Warringah Sea Eagles	24	19	1	4	2	879	417	+462	43
2	St. George Illawarra Dragons	24	19	0	5	2	758	461	+297	42
3	Melbourne Storm (P)	24	19	0	5	2	833	597	+236	42
4	Wests Tigers	24	15	1	8	2	709	588	+121	35
5	Brisbane Broncos	24	15	0	9	2	698	551	+147	34
6	South Sydney Rabbitohs	24	13	1	10	2	776	568	+208	31
7	New Zealand Warriors	24	13	1	10	2	725	612	+113	31
8	Canberra Raiders	24	11	2	11	2	706	685	+21	28
9	North Queensland Cowboys	24	12	0	12	2	668	683	-15	28
10	Newcastle Knights	24	9	1	14	2	596	756	-160	23
11	Canterbury Bulldogs	24	9	1	14	2	649	867	-218	23
12	Parramatta Eels	24	8	0	16	2	604	698	-94	20
13	Penrith Panthers	24	8	0	16	2	573	755	-182	20
14	Gold Coast Titans	24	8	0	16	2	542	738	-196	20
15	Sydney Roosters	24	6	0	18	2	443	736	-293	16
16	Cronulla-Sutherland Sharks	24	4	0	20	2	391	838	-447	12

== Fixtures ==
=== Pre-season ===
Date	Opponent	Venue	Result	Score	Tries	Goals	Attendance	Report
14 February	Penrith Panthers	Griffith Exies Sports Club, Griffith	Win	34–12	N/A	N/A	N/A	
21 February	Penrith Panthers	CUA Stadium, Penrith	Win	10–18	N/A	N/A	N/A	
28 February	Sydney Roosters	Bluetongue Central Coast Stadium, Gosford	Win	24–30	N/A	N/A	N/A	

Note: Match one was an unofficial trial match.

=== Home and away season ===
Date	Round	Opponent	Venue	Result	Score	Tries	Goals	Attendance	Report
14 March	Round 1	New Zealand Warriors	Mt Smart Stadium, Auckland	Loss	26–18	Grothe, Hayne, Inu	Burt 3/3	20,102	
20 March	Round 2	South Sydney Rabbitohs	ANZ Stadium, Sydney	Win	8–14	Mateo, Reddy	Burt 3/3, Finch 0/1	20,871	
28 March	Round 3	Canberra Raiders	Parramatta Stadium, Parramatta	Win	18–16	Grothe (2), Hayne, Inu	Burt 1/4	11,116	
3 April	Round 4	Sydney Roosters	Sydney Football Stadium, Sydney	Loss	24–6	Hayne	Burt 1/1	11,231	
10 April	Round 5	St George Illawarra Dragons	Parramatta Stadium, Parramatta	Loss	8–22	Burt	Burt 2/2	19,017	
19 April	Round 6	Canterbury Bankstown Bulldogs	ANZ Stadium, Sydney	Loss	18–48	Hauraki (2), Hayne	Burt 3/3	18,233	
24 April	Round 7	Brisbane Broncos	Suncorp Stadium, Queensland	Loss	40–8	Tautai, Uaisele	Burt 0/2	30,887	
1 May	Round 8	North Queensland Cowboys	Parramatta Stadium, Parramatta	Win	28–18	Burt, Galuvao, Hauraki, Hayne, M. Keating	K. Keating 3/3, Burt 1/3	8,104	
8–11 June	Round 9	Bye							
17 May	Round 10	Manly Warringah Sea Eagles	Brookvale Oval, Manly	Loss	34–10	Hayne (2)	Burt 1/2	15,916	
22 May	Round 11	South Sydney Rabbitohs	ANZ Stadium, Sydney	Draw	16–16	Hayne (2), Grothe	Burt 2/4	10,670	
30 May	Round 12	Cronulla Sutherland Sharks	Parramatta Stadium, Parramatta	Loss	10–13	Burt, Reddy	Burt 2/4	7,014	
7 June	Round 13	Newcastle Knights	Newcastle International Sports Centre, Newcastle	Win	18–20	Moimoi, Reddy, Robson	Burt 4/4	18,085	
15 June	Round 14	Wests Tigers	Parramatta Stadium, Parramatta	Loss	23–6	Burt	Burt 1/1	12,003	
19–22 June	Round 15	Bye							
28 June	Round 16	Brisbane Broncos	Parramatta Stadium, Parramatta	Win	21–14	Grothe, Inu, Mortimer, Reddy	Burt 2/4 & FG: 1	10,030	
5 July	Round 17	Penrith Panthers	CUA Stadium, Penrith	Loss	38–34	Mortimer (2), Burt, Hayne, Hindmarsh, Reddy	Burt 5/6	16,845	
13 July	Round 18	Gold Coast Titans	Skilled Park, Robina	Loss	18–12	Galuvao, Grothe, Mortimer	Burt 0/1, Inu 0/2	14,009	
20 July	Round 19	Melbourne Storm	Parramatta Stadium, Parramatta	Win	18–16	Lowrie, Moimoi, Robson	Burt 3/4	10,804	
25 July	Round 20	Canterbury Bankstown Bulldogs	ANZ Stadium, Sydney	Win	8–27	Grothe (2), Burt, Kingston, Moimoi	Burt 3/5 & FG: 1	31,664	
2 August	Round 21	Cronulla Sharks	Toyota Park, Cronulla	Win	0–30	Hayne (2), Reddy (2), Inu	Burt 5/6	12,246	
9 August	Round 22	Newcastle Knights	Parramatta Stadium, Parramatta	Win	40–8	Burt (2), Grothe, Inu, Moimoi, Reddy	Burt 8/8	17,669	
15 August	Round 23	New Zealand Warriors	Parramatta Stadium, Parramatta	Win	40–4	Burt (2), Reddy (2), Grothe, M. Keating, Mortimer	Burt 6/7	12,627	
21 August	Round 24	Wests Tigers	Sydney Football Stadium, Sydney	Win	18–26	Burt, Hayne, Inu, Robson	Inu 5/5	34,272	
28 August	Round 25	Penrith Panthers	Parramatta Stadium, Parramatta	Win	48–6	Mortimer (3), Burt (2), M. Keating, Moimoi, Reddy	Burt 8/8	20,237	
4 September	Round 26	St George Illawarra Dragons	WIN Jubilee Oval, Kogarah	Loss	37–0	Nil	Nil	17,974	

=== Finals series ===
Date	Round	Opponent	Venue	Result	Score	Tries	Goals	Attendance	Report
13 September	QF	St George Illawarra Dragons	WIN Jubilee Oval, Kogarah	Win	12–25	Burt, Grothe, Hayne, Mortimer	Burt 4/4 & FG: 1	18,174	
18 September	SF	Gold Coast Titans	Sydney Football Stadium, Sydney	Win	27–2	Kingston, Mateo, B. Smith, Wright	Burt 5/5, Hayne FG: 1	28,524	
25 September	PF	Canterbury Bankstown Bulldogs	ANZ Stadium, Sydney	Win	12–22	Burt, Galuvao, Mannah, Mortimer	Burt 3/4	74,549	
4 October	GF	Melbourne Storm	ANZ Stadium, Sydney	Loss	23–16	Grothe, Moimoi, Reddy	Burt 2/3	82,538	

== Players and staff ==
The playing squad and coaching staff of the Parramatta Eels for the 2009 NRL season as of 18 September 2009.

Parramatta Eels
NRL Premiership Squad		Coaching staff
Nathan Cayless (c) – PR, SR; Nathan Hindmarsh (vc) – SR; Luke Burt – WG; Eric Grothe, Jr. – WG; Fuifui Moimoi – PR; Feleti Mateo – LK; Ben Smith – CE; Joel Reddy – CE; Jarryd Hayne – FB; Todd Lowrie – SR; Krisnan Inu – CE; Junior Paulo – SR; Weller Hauraki – SR	Taulima Tautai – CE; Joe Galuvao – SR; Matt Keating – HK; Brendan Oake – SR; Kris Keating – FE; Broderick Wright – SR; Tim Mannah – PR; Jeff Robson – HB; Etu Uaisele – WG; Jeremy Latimore – PR; Kevin Kingston – HK; Daniel Mortimer – FE	Head coach: Daniel Anderson; Legend: (c) Captain(s); (vc) Vice-captain(s); Injured; Updated: 5 July 2013; Source(s): Player profiles and coaching staff

== Awards ==
The following awards were awarded in the post-season:

- Michael Cronin clubman of the year award: Nathan Hindmarsh
- Ken Thornett Medal (Players' player): Jarryd Hayne
- Jack Gibson Award (Coach's award): Joel Reddy
- Eric Grothe Rookie of the Year Award: Daniel Mortimer
