= Eric Grothe =

Eric Grothe may refer to:

- Eric Grothe Sr., Australian former professional rugby league footballer
- Eric Grothe Jr., Australian former professional rugby league footballer and son of above
