= 2009 Sydney Roosters season =

- NRL rank: 16th
- 2009 record: Wins: 5; draws: 0; losses: 19
- Points scored: For: 382 (67tries, 56goals, 2fieldgoals);

Team information
- CEO: Steve Noyce
- Coach: Brad Fittler
- Captain: Craig Fitzgibbon, Braith Anasta
- Stadium: Sydney Football Stadium
- Avg. attendance: 14,388

Top scorers
- Tries: Shaun Kenny-Dowall 14
- Goals: Craig Fitzgibbon 47
- Points: Craig Fitzgibbon 106
← 2008	2010 →

The 2009 Sydney Roosters season was the 102nd in the club's history. They competed in the NRL's 2009 Telstra Premiership, finishing the regular season in last place and collecting the club's first wooden spoon since 1966.

== Matches ==
	Opponent	Result	Score	Date	Venue
Trial	St. George Illawarra Dragons	Loss	6-54	February	Members Equity Stadium
Foundation Cup	Wests Tigers	Win	16-12	February	Sydney Football Stadium
Trial	Parramatta Eels	Loss	24-30	1 March	Bluetongue Stadium
Round 1	South Sydney Rabbitohs	Loss	12-52	15 March	Sydney Football Stadium
Round 2	Canberra Raiders	Win	28-4	22 March	Canberra Stadium
Round 3	Wests Tigers	Loss	24-40	27 March	Sydney Football Stadium
Round 4	Parramatta Eels	Win	24-6	3 April	Sydney Football Stadium
Round 5	Brisbane Broncos	Loss	24-28	10 April	Sydney Football Stadium
Round 6	New Zealand Warriors	Loss	16-17	19 April	Mt Smart Stadium
Round 7	St. George Illawarra Dragons	Loss	0-29	25 April	Sydney Football Stadium
Round 8	Cronulla Sharks	Win	19-12		Toyota Park
Round 9	Melbourne Storm	Loss	12-28		Bluetongue Stadium
Round 10	Newcastle Knights	Loss	6-38		Sydney Football Stadium
Round 11	Penrith Panthers	Loss	6-48		CUA Stadium
Round 12	BYE				
Round 13	Manly Sea Eagles	Loss	18-38		Brookvale Oval
Round 14	Gold Coast Titans	Loss	20-24		Bluetongue Stadium
Round 15	North Queensland Cowboys	Loss	22-24		Dairy Farmers Stadium
Round 16	Cronulla Sharks	Win	19-12		Sydney Football Stadium
Round 17	St. George Illawarra Dragons	Loss	12-34		WIN Jubilee Oval
Round 18	BYE				
Round 19	New Zealand Warriors	Loss	24-30		Sydney Football Stadium
Round 20	South Sydney Rabbitohs	Loss	20-40		ANZ Stadium
Round 21	Newcastle Knights	Win	30-18		EnergyAustralia Stadium
Round 22	Wests Tigers	Loss	10-17		Sydney Football Stadium
Round 23	Manly Sea Eagles	Loss	12-44		Sydney Football Stadium
Round 24	Canterbury Bulldogs	Loss	4-28		ANZ Stadium
Round 25	Melbourne Storm	Loss	4-38		Olympic Park Stadium
Round 26	North Queensland Cowboys	Loss	16-32		Sydney Football Stadium

== Round By Round ==
All the Teams and Results round by round for Season 2009.

Round 1: South Sydney Rabbitohs 52 (Nathan Merritt 3, Fetuli Talanoa 2, Colin Best, Eddy Pettybourne, Chris Sandow, Rhys Wesser tries; Chris Sandow 5, Issac Luke 3 goals) def. Sydney Roosters 12 (Braith Anasta, Jake Friend tries; Craig Fitzgibbon 2 goals)

Team: Anthony Minichiello, Sam Perrett, Mitchell Aubusson, Iosia Soliola, Shaun Kenny-Dowall, Braith Anasta, Mitchell Pearce, Mark O'Meley, James Aubusson, Nate Myles, Lopini Paea, Craig Fitzgibbon, Setaimata Sa; Interchange: Frank-Paul Nuuausala, Shane Shackleton, Jake Friend, Martin Kennedy.

Round 2: Sydney Roosters 28 (Braith Anasta 2, Shaun Kenny-Dowall, Anthony Minichiello, Mitchell Pearce tries; Craig Fitzgibbon 3, Shaun Kenny-Dowall goals) def. Canberra Raiders 4 (Bronson Harrison try)

Team: Anthony Minichiello, Sam Perrett, Mitchell Aubusson, Iosia Soliola, Shaun Kenny-Dowall, Braith Anasta, Mitchell Pearce, Mark O'Meley, James Aubusson, Nate Myles, Willie Mason, Craig Fitzgibbon, Setaimata Sa; Interchange: Lopini Paea, Frank-Paul Nuuausala, Shane Shackleton, Ben Jones.

Round 3: Wests Tigers 40 (Chris Lawrence 2, Taniela Tuiaki 2, Dean Collis, Robbie Farrah, Tim Moltzen tries; Benji Marshall 6 Goals) def. Sydney Roosters 24 (Mitchell Aubusson 2, Braith Anasta, Shaun Kenny-Dowall tries; Craig Fitzgibbon 4 goals) Team: Ben Jones, Sam Perrett, Mitchell Aubusson, Iosia Soliola, Shaun Kenny-Dowall, Braith Anasta, Mitchell Pearce, Mark O'Meley, James Aubusson, Nate Myles, Willie Mason, Craig Fitzgibbon, Setaimata Sa; Interchange: Sonny Tuigamala, Lopini Paea, Frank-Paul Nuuausala, Shane Shackleton.

Round 4: Sydney Roosters 24 (Shaun Kenny-Dowall 2, Sam Perrett tries; Craig Fitzgibbon 6 goals) def. Parramatta Eels 6 (Jarryd Hayne try, Luke Burt goal)

Team: Sam Perrett, Sisa Waqa, Mitchell Aubusson, Iosia Soliola, Shaun Kenny-Dowall, Braith Anasta, Mitchell Pearce, Mark O'Meley, James Aubusson, Frank-Paul Nuuausala, Shane Shackleton, Craig Fitzgibbon, Setaimata Sa; Interchange: Lopini Paea, Martin Kennedy, Jake Friend, Rohan Ahern.

Round 5: Brisbane Broncos 28 (Karmichael Hunt 2, Antonio Winterstien 2, Steve Michaels tries; Corey Parker 4 goals) def. Sydney Roosters 24 (Braith Anasta, Willie Mason, Mitchell Pearce, Sam Perrett tries; Braith Anasta 3, Craig Fitzgibbon goal)

Team: Sam Perrett, Sisa Waqa, Mitchell Aubusson, Setaimata Sa, Shaun Kenny-Dowall, Braith Anasta, Mitchell Pearce, Mark O'Meley, James Aubusson, Frank-Paul Nuuausala, Nate Myles, Craig Fitzgibbon, Shane Shackleton; Interchange: Lopini Paea, Willie Mason, Jake Friend, Ben Jones.

Round 6: New Zealand Warriors 17 (Stacey Jones, Jerome Ropati, Manu Vatuvei tries; Denan Kemp 2 goals; Stacey Jones field goal) def. Sydney Roosters 16 (Mitchell Pearce, Shane Shackleton, Iosia Soliola tries; Craig Fitzgibbon 2 goals)

Team: Sam Perrett, Sonny Tuigamala, Ben Jones, Iosia Soliola, Shaun Kenny-Dowall, Braith Anasta, Mitchell Pearce, Mark O'Meley, James Aubusson, Frank-Paul Nuuausala, Nate Myles, Craig Fitzgibbon, Shane Shackleton; Interchange: Lopini Paea, Willie Mason, Jake Friend, Jordan Tansey.

Round 7: St. George Illawarra Dragons 29 (Jamie Soward 2, Brett Morris, Jason Nightingale tries; Jamies Soward 6 goals, field goal) def. Sydney Roosters 0.

Team: Sam Perrett, Sisa Waqa, Iosia Soliola, Setaimata Sa, Shaun Kenny-Dowall, Braith Anasta, Mitchell Pearce, Mark O'Meley, James Aubusson, Frank-Paul Nuuausala, Wilie Mason, Nate Myles, Craig Fitzgibbon; Interchange: Lopini Paea, Shane Shacleton, Jake Friend, Jordan Tansey.

Round 8: Sydney Roosters 19 (Shaun Kenny-Dowall 2, Sam Perrett tries; Craig Fitzgibbon 3 goals; Braith Anasta field goal) def. Cronulla Sharks 12 (Paul Gallen, Reece Williams tries; Luke Covell 2 goals)

Team: Jordan Tansey, Sam Perrett, Setaimata Sa, Ben Jones, Shaun Kenny-Dowall, Braith Anasta, Mitchell Pearce, Nate Myles, James Aubusson, Frank-Paul Nuuausala, Iosia Soliola, Craig Fitzgibbon, Shane Shacleton; Interchange: Lopini Paea, Willie Mason, Jake Friend, Rohan Ahern.

Round 9: Melbourne Storm 28 (Brett Finch, Ryan Hoffman, Jeff Lima, Steve Turner, Brett White tries; Joseph Tomane 4 goals) def. Sydney Roosters 12 (Sam Perrett, Setaimata Sa tries; Craig Fitzgibbon 2 goals)

Team: Jordan Tansey, Sam Perrett, Setaimata Sa, Ben Jones, Shaun Kenny-Dowall, Braith Anasta, Mitchell Pearce, Nate Myles, James Aubusson, Frank-Paul Nuuausala, Iosia Soliola, Willie Mason, Craig Fitzgibbon; Interchange: Lopini Paea, Jake Friend, Nick Kouparitsas, Sisa Waqa.

Round 10: Newcastle Knights 38 (Jarrod Mullen 2, Zeb Taia 2, Danny Wicks, Cooper Vuna; Kurt Gidley 7 goals) def. Sydney Roosters 6 (Jordan Tansey try; Braith Anasta goal)

Team: Jordan Tansey, Sam Perrett, Setaimata Sa, Sisa Waqa, Shaun Kenny-Dowall, Braith Anasta, Mitchell Pearce, Nate Myles, Jake Friend, Lopini Paea, Iosia Soliola, Willie Mason, Craig Fitzgibbon; Interchange: Ben Jones, Frank-Paul Nuuausala, Mark O'Meley, Nick Kouparitsas.

Round 11: Penrith Panthers 48 (Michael Jennings 3, Wade Graham 2, Lachlan Coote, Shane Elford, Luke Lewis, Frank Pritchard tries; Jarrod Sammut 3, Luke Walsh 3 goals) def. Sydney Roosters 6 (Ben Jones try, Braith Anasta goal)

Team: Braith Anasta, Shaun-Kenny-Dowall, Setaimata Sa, Sam Perrett, Sonny Tuigamala, Ben Jones, Mitchell Pearce, Nate Myles, Jordan Tansey, Mark O'Meley, Shane Shackleton, Willie Mason, Lopini Paea; Interchange: Frank-Paul Nuuausala, Nick Kouparitsas, Tom Symonds, Stanley Waqa.

Round 13: Manly Sea Eagles 38 (Michael Robertson 2, Steve Matai, Glenn Stewart, Anthony Watmough, David Williams, Tony Williams tries; Matt Orford 5 goals) def. Sydney Roosters 18 (Shaun Kenny-Dowall 2, Setaimata Sa, Ben Jones tries; Craig Fitzgibbon goal)

Team: Sam Perrett, Sonny Tuigamala, Setaimata Sa, Ben Jones, Shaun Kenny-Dowall, Braith Anasta, Mitchell Pearce, Mark O'Meley, Jake Friend, Lopini Paea, Shane Shackleton, Willie Mason, Craig Fitzgibbon; Interchange: Nate Myles, Frank-Paul Nuuausala, Tom Symonds, Jordan Tansey.

Round 14: Gold Coast Titans 24 (Aaron Cannings, Nathan Friend, Esi Tonga, Chris Walker tries; Scott Prince 4 goals) def. Sydney Roosters 20 (Sisa Waqa 2, Mitchell Pearce, Tom Symonds tries; Braith Anasta, Craig Fitzgibbon goals)

Team: Sam Perrett, Sisa Waqa, Setaimata Sa, Ben Jones, Shaun Kenny-Dowall, Braith Anasta, Mitchell Pearce, Mark O'Meley, Jake Friend, Nate Myles, Shane Shackleton, Anthony Cherrington, Craig Fitzgibbon; Interchange: Lopini Paea, Frank-Paul Nuuausala, Tom Symonds, Mitchell Aubusson.

Round 15: North Queensland Cowboys 24 (Travis Burns, Aaron Payne, Steve Southern, Carl Webb tries; John Williams 4 goals) def. Sydney Roosters 22 (Mitchell Aubusson, Anthony Cherrington, Shane Shackleton, Ben Jones tries; Craig Fitzgibbon 3 goals)

Team: Sam Perrett, Sisa Waqa, Ben Jones, Mitchell Aubusson, Shaun Kenny-Dowall, Braith Anasta, Mitchell Pearce, Lopini Paea, Jake Friend, Shane Shackleton, Iosia Soliola, Anthony Cherrington, Craig Fitzgibbon; Interchange: Ray Moujalli, Frank-Paul Nuuausala, Tom Symonds, Rohan Ahern.

Round 16: Sydney Roosters 19 (Shaun Kenny-Dowall, Mitchell Pearce, Sam Perrett tries; Craig Fitzgibbon 3 goals; Mitchell Pearce Field Goal) def. Cronulla Sharks 12 (Blake Ferguson, Nathan Stapleton tries; Luke Covell 2 goals)

Team: Sam Perrett, Sandor Earl, Mitchell Aubusson, Ben Jones, Shaun Kenny-Dowall, Setaimata Sa, Mitchell Pearce, Nate Myles, Jake Friend, Lopini Paea, Anthony Cherrington, Willie Mason, Craig Fitzgibbon; Interchange: Shane Shackleton, Frank-Paul Nuuausala, Tom Symonds, Nick Kouparitsas.

Round 17: St. George Illawarra Dragons 34 (Matt Prior 2, Jamie Soward 2, Neville Costigan, Wendell Sailor tries; Jamie Soward 5 goals) def. Sydney Roosters 12 (Craig Fitzgibbon 2 tries, 2 goals)

Team: Sam Perrett, Sandor Earl, Mitchell Aubusson, Ben Jones, Shaun Kenny-Dowall, Setaimata Sa, Mitchell Pearce, Nate Myles, Jake Friend, Lopini Paea, Anthony Cherrington, Willie Mason, Craig Fitzgibbon; Interchange: Shane Shackleton, Frank-Paul Nuuausala, Tom Symonds, Nick Kouparitsas.

Round 19: New Zealand Warriors 30 (Manu Vatuvei 2, Patrick Ah Van, Stacey Jones, Simon Mannering, Wade McKinnon tries; Stacey Jones 3 goals) def. Sydney Roosters 24 (Tom Symonds 2, Willie Mason, Ben Jones tries; Craig Fitzgibbon 4 goals)

Team: Sam Perrett, Sandor Earl, Mitchell Aubusson, Tom Symonds, Shaun Kenny-Dowall, Ben Jones, Mitchell Pearce, Shane Shackleton, Jake Friend, Frank-Paul Nuuausala, Setaimata Sa, Willie Mason, Craig Fitzgibbon; Interchange: Lopini Paea, Stanley Waqa, Anthony Cherrington, Nick Kouparitsas.

Round 20: South Sydney Rabbitohs 40 (Jamie Simpson 3, Issac Luke, Nathan Merritt, Eddy Pettybourne, John Sutton, Craig Wing tries; Chris Sandow 4 goals) def. Sydney Roosters 20 (Mitchell Aubusson, Jake Friend, Shaun Kenny-Dowall, Mitchell Pearce tries; Shaun Kenny-Dowall 2 goals)

Team: Sam Perrett, Anthony Minichiello, Mitchell Aubusson, Tom Symonds, Shaun Kenny-Dowall, Ben Jones, Mitchell Pearce, Frank-Paul Nuuausala, Jake Friend, Lopini Paea, Setaimata Sa, Willie Mason, Iosia Soliola; Interchange: Shane Shackleton, Stanley Waqa, Rohan Ahern, Nick Kouparitsas.

Round 21: Sydney Roosters 30 (Craig Fitzgibbon, Willie Mason, Mitchell Pearce, Iosia Soliola, Setaimata Sa tries; Craig Fitzgibbon 5 goals) def. Newcastle Knights 18 (Kurt Gidley 2, Adam MacDougall tries; Kurt Gidley 3 goals)

Team: Sam Perrett, Shaun Kenny-Dowall, Mitchell Aubusson, Setaimata Sa, Iwi Hauraki, Ben Jones, Mitchell Pearce, Frank-Paul Nuuausala, Jake Friend, Lopini Paea, Iosia Soliola, Willie Mason, Craig Fitzgibbon; Interchange: Stanley Waqa, Shane Shackleton, Riley Brown, Nick Kouparitsas.

Round 22: Wests Tigers 17 (Beau Ryan 2, Taniela Tuiaki tries; Benji Marshall 2 goals; Robbie Farrah field goal) def. Sydney Roosters 10 (Shaun Kenny-Dowall, Setaimata Sa tries; Craig Fitzgibbon goal) *Sin Bin: Mitchell Aubusson.

Team: Sam Perrett, Iwi Hauraki, Mitchell Aubusson, Setaimata Sa, Shaun Kenny-Dowall, Anthony Minichiello, Mitchell Pearce, Frank-Paul Nuuausala, Jake Friend, Lopini Paea, Iosia Soliola, Willie Mason, Craig Fitzgibbon; Interchange: Stanley Waqa, Shane Shackleton, Riley Brown, Ben Jones.

Round 23: Manly Sea Eagles 44 (Michael Robertson 2, David Williams 2, Jason King, Matt Orford, Glenn Stewart tries; Matt Orford 6, Jamie Lyon 2 goals) def. Sydney Roosters 12 (Shaun Kenny-Dowall, Iwi Hauraki tries; Craig Fitzgibbon 2 goals)

Team: Sam Perrett, Iwi Hauraki, Mitchell Aubusson, Setaimata Sa, Shaun Kenny-Dowall, Anthony Minichiello, Mitchell Pearce, Frank-Paul Nuuausala, Jake Friend, Lopini Paea, Iosia Soliola, Willie Mason, Craig Fitzgibbon; Interchange: Stanley Waqa, Shane Shackleton, Riley Brown, Ben Jones.

Round 24: Bulldogs 28 (Luke Patten 2, Hazem El Masri, Josh Morris, David Stagg tries; Hazem El Masri 4 goals def. Sydney Roosters 4 (Ben Jones try)

Team: Sam Perrett, Iwi Hauraki, Mitchell Aubusson, Ben Jones, Shaun Kenny-Dowall, Anthony Minichiello, Mitchell Pearce, Frank-Paul Nuuausala, Riley Brown, Shane Shackleton, Iosia Soliola, Setaimata Sa, Craig Fitzgibbon; Interchange: Jake Friend, Willie Mason, Stanley Waqa, Nate Myles.

Round 25: Melbourne Storm 38 (Greg Inglis 2, Steve Turner 2, Will Chambers, Billy Slater, Aiden Tolman tries; Cameron Smith 5 goals) def. Sydney Roosters 4 (Shaun Kenny-Dowall try)

Team: Sam Perrett, Iwi Hauraki, Mitchell Aubusson, Ben Jones, Shaun Kenny-Dowall, Anthony Minichiello, Mitchell Pearce, Frank-Paul Nuuausala, Riley Brown, Shane Shackleton, Iosia Soliola, Nate Myles, Craig Fitzgibbon; Interchange: Jake Friend, Willie Mason, Stanley Waqa, Khalid Deeb.

Round 26: North Queensland Cowboys 32 (Ashley Graham, Donald Malone, Johnathan Thurston, Willie Tonga, Shane Tronce, Ty Williams tries; Johnathan Thurston 4 goals) def. Sydney Roosters 16 (Iwi Hauraki, Shaun Kenny-Dowall, Willie Mason tries; Craig Fitzgibbon 2 goals)

Team: Sam Perrett, Iwi Hauraki, Mitchell Aubusson, Ben Jones, Shaun Kenny-Dowall, Anthony Minichiello, Mitchell Pearce, Frank-Paul Nuuausala, Riley Brown, Shane Shackleton, Iosia Soliola, Nate Myles, Craig Fitzgibbon; Interchange: Stanley Waqa, Willie Mason, Jake Friend, Martin Kennedy.

== Season summary ==
Sydney Roosters 2009	Appearance	Interchange	Tries	Goals	F/G	Points
Rohan Ahern	-	4	-	-	-	0
Braith Anasta	14	-	5	6	1	33
James Aubusson	9	-	-	-	-	0
Mitchell Aubusson	16	1	4	-	-	16
Riley Brown	3	3	-	-	-	0
Anthony Cherrington	4	1	1	-	-	4
Khalid Deeb	-	1	-	-	-	0
Sandor Earl	3	-	-	-	-	0
Craig Fitzgibbon	22	-	3	47	-	106
Jake Friend	11	10	2	-	-	8
Iwi Hauraki	6	-	2	-	-	8
Ben Jones	16	5	5	-	-	20
Martin Kennedy	-	3	-	-	-	0
Shaun Kenny-Dowall	24	-	14	3	-	62
Nick Kouparitsas	-	8	-	-	-	0
Willie Mason	14	6	4	-	-	16
Anthony Minichiello	8	-	1	-	-	4
Ray Moujalli	-	1	-	-	-	0
Nate Myles	15	2	-	-	-	0
Frank-Paul Nuuausala	14	10	-	-	-	0
Mark O'Meley	10	1	-	-	-	0
Lopini Paea	11	10	-	-	-	0
Mitchell Pearce	24	-	8	-	1	33
Sam Perrett	24	-	5	-	-	20
Setaimata Sa	20	-	4	-	-	16
Shane Shackleton	12	10	2	-	-	8
Iosia Soliola	17	-	2	-	-	8
Tom Symonds	2	6	2	-	-	8
Jordan Tansey	4	3	1	-	-	4
Sonny Tuigamala	3	1	-	-	-	0
Sisa Waqa	6	1	2	-	-	8
Stanley Waqa	-	9	-	-	-	0
Total	320	96	67	56	2	382

== 2009 squad ==
No.

Position
Player

989 Craig Fitzgibbon (c) – SR 994 Anthony Minichiello – FB 1033 Lopini Paea – PR 1040 Sam Perrett – WG 1045 Shane Shackleton – SR 1047 Iosia Soliola – CE 1055 Braith Anasta – FE 1063 Setaimata Sa – CE 1067 Mitchell Aubusson – CE 1069 Shaun Kenny-Dowall – WG 1090 Iwi Hauraki – WG 1070 Nate Myles – SR 1072 Mitchell Pearce – HB 1077 James Aubusson – HK

No.

Position
Player

1078 Riley Brown – HK 1080 Willie Mason – SR 1081 Mark O'Meley – PR 1082 Anthony Cherrington – SR Sisa Waqa – WG Stanley Waqa – PR Nick Kouparitsas – SR Ray Moujalli – PR Sandor Earl – WG Jake Friend – HK Ben Jones – SR Frank-Paul Nuuausala – PR Jordan Tansey – FB

== Ladder ==
2009 NRL season
Pos	Team	Pld	W	D	L	B	PF	PA	PD	Pts
1	St. George Illawarra Dragons	24	17	0	7	2	548	329	+219	38
2	Canterbury-Bankstown Bulldogs	24	18	0	6	2	575	428	+147	38^{1}
3	Gold Coast Titans	24	16	0	8	2	514	467	+47	36
4	Melbourne Storm	24	14	1	9	2	505	348	+157	33
5	Manly-Warringah Sea Eagles	24	14	0	10	2	549	459	+90	32
6	Brisbane Broncos	24	14	0	10	2	511	566	−55	32
7	Newcastle Knights	24	13	0	11	2	508	491	+17	30
8	Parramatta Eels	24	12	1	11	2	476	473	+3	29
9	Wests Tigers	24	12	0	12	2	558	483	+75	28
10	South Sydney Rabbitohs	24	11	1	12	2	566	549	+17	27
11	Penrith Panthers	24	11	1	12	2	515	589	−74	27
12	North Queensland Cowboys	24	11	0	13	2	558	474	+84	26
13	Canberra Raiders	24	9	0	15	2	489	520	−31	22
14	New Zealand Warriors	24	7	2	15	2	377	565	−188	20
15	Cronulla-Sutherland Sharks	24	5	0	19	2	359	568	−209	14
16	Sydney Roosters	24	5	0	19	2	382	681	−299	14

^{1} The Bulldogs were deducted 2 competition points after an interchange breach in Round 2.

== Transfers 2010 ==
=== 2010 Gains ===
- (South Africa) JP Du Plessis (South African Rugby Union)
- (Australia) Daniel Conn (Gold Coast Titans)
- (Australia) Todd Carney (Canberra Raiders)
- (Australia) Phil Graham (rugby league) (Canberra Raiders)
- (New Zealand) Jared Waerea-Hargreaves (Manly Sea Eagles)
- (Australia) Jason Ryles (Catalans Dragons)
- (Cook Islands) Brad Takairangi (South Sydney Rabbitohs NYC)
- (France) Jason Baitieri (Parramatta Eels NYC)
- (Italy) Aiden Guerra (Melbourne Storm)

==== 2010 Losses ====
- (Australia) Craig Fitzgibbon (Hull)
- (New Zealand) Iosia Soliola (St Helens R.F.C.)
- (Australia) Shane Shackleton (Parramatta Eels)
- (Australia) Mark O'Meley (Hull)

=== Mid-Season 2009 Transfers ===
==== Losses ====
- (England) Jordan Tansey (Hull)
