= Stanley Waqa =

Fijian rugby league footballer

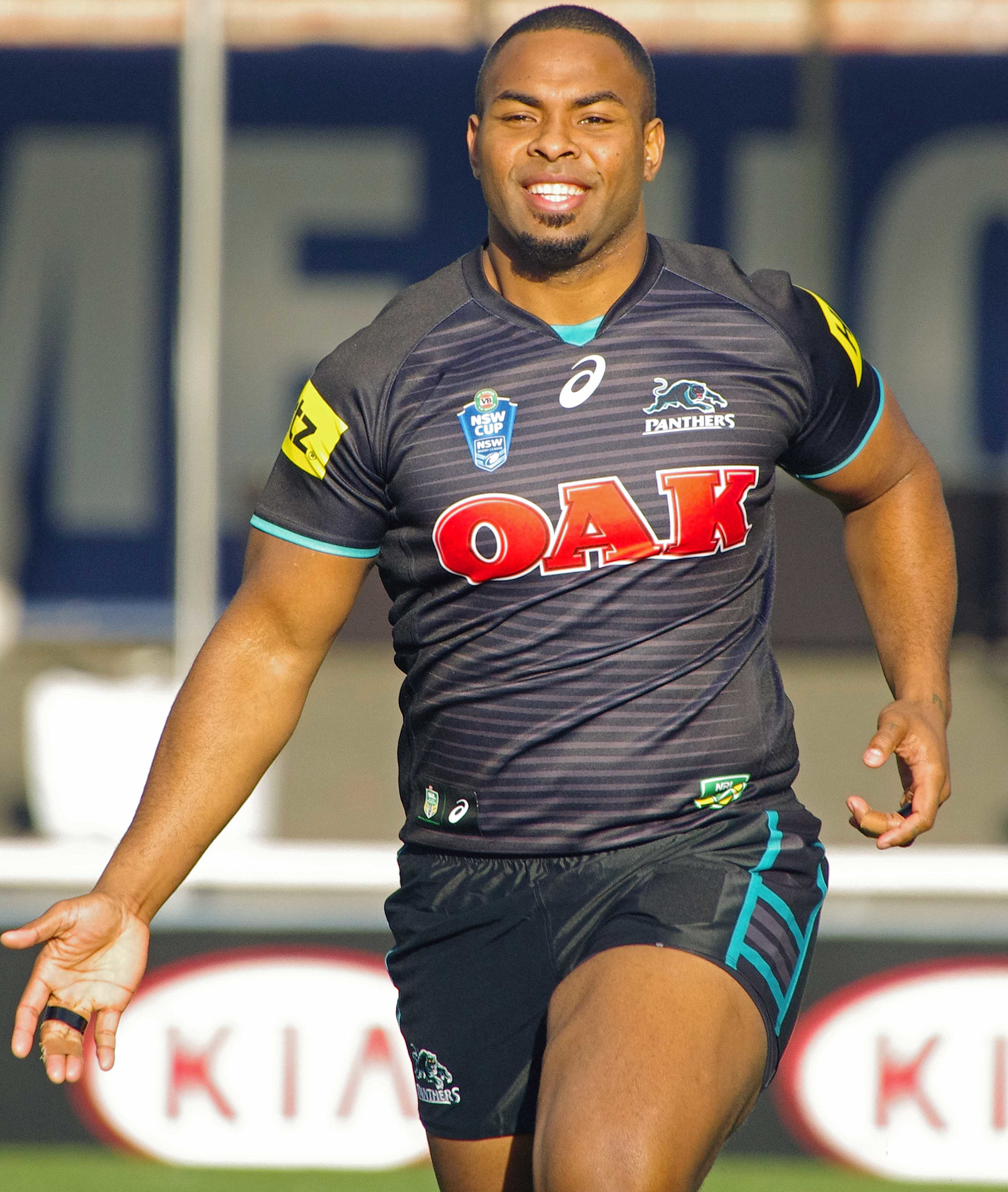

Personal information
- Born: 28 April 1988 (age 38) Suva, Fiji
- Height: 190 cm (6 ft 3 in)
- Weight: 118 kg (18 st 8 lb)

Playing information
- Position: Prop
Club
| Years | Team | Pld | T | G | FG | P |
|---|---|---|---|---|---|---|
| 2009 | Sydney Roosters | 9 | 0 | 0 | 0 | 0 |
- Source: As of 6 January 2020

Stanley Waqa (born 28 April 1988) is a Fijian former professional rugby league footballer who played in the 2000s. He played for the Sydney Roosters in the National Rugby League. His position is at prop.

== Background ==
He played his junior rugby for the Guildford Owls. He was a member of the Roosters Toyota Cup team in 2008.

== Playing career ==
Waqa made his first grade debut for the Sydney Roosters in round 11 of the 2009 NRL season against Penrith which ended in a 48-6 loss at Penrith Park. Waqa made nine appearances for the Sydney Roosters in 2009 as the club finished last on the table for the first time since 1966. In 2015, Waqa played for Penrith's NSW Cup team.

== Controversy ==
In October 2009, Waqa was charged over a knife-wielding incident in which a young woman was wounded in Sydney's east. Police allege Waqa was arguing with a woman inside an apartment in Randwick. It is alleged Waqa then armed himself with a knife, and recklessly wounded the woman. The woman was taken to hospital suffering lacerations.
