= 2009 St. George Illawarra Dragons season =

- NRL rank: 1st
- 2009 record: Wins: 17; draws: 0; losses: 7
- Points scored: For: 570; against: 378

Team information
- CEO: (Australia) Peter Doust
- Coach: (Australia) Wayne Bennett
- Captain: (Australia) Ben Hornby
- Stadium: WIN Jubilee Oval WIN Stadium

Top scorers
- Tries: Brett Morris (25)
- Goals: Jamie Soward (90)
- Points: Jamie Soward (234)
← 2008	2010 →

The 2009 St. George Illawarra Dragons season was 11th in the joint venture Rugby League club's history. They competed in the NRL's 2009 Telstra Premiership under new coach Wayne Bennett and finished the season as minor premiers. However a series of losses late in the season saw them become the first minor premiers to bow out of the McIntyre system with two consecutive losses in the finals.

== Season summary ==
Coming off a 2008 Qualifying Final loss to the Manly-Warringah Sea Eagles and with a new Coach in the office being Wayne Bennett, the Dragons signed a number of new players but lost just as many. The Dragons were hoping to improve the previous years Qualifying Final loss, by making it even further this year. Five Toyota Cup players of 2008 have been promoted to the First Grade squad with more talented juniors rising through the ranks within the club.

St. George led the competition in defence in 2009 and finished the season with the minor premiership, the club's first. Their strong performance also led to new records for home match attendances at WIN Jubilee Oval.

St George exited the finals series in the second week of the finals.

== Preseason ==
Date	Round	Opponent	Venue	Score	Attendance	Report
14 February	Trial	Sydney Roosters	Members Equity Stadium, Perth	54 – 6	9,832	
21 February	Mercury Challenge	Canterbury-Bankstown Bulldogs	WIN Stadium, Wollongong	24 – 12	7,628	
28 February	Charity Shield	South Sydney Rabbitohs	ANZ Stadium, Sydney	6 – 18	25,871	
Legend: Win Loss Draw

== Regular season ==
Date	Round	Opponent	Venue	Score	Attendance	Report
13 March	1	Melbourne Storm	Olympic Park Stadium, Melbourne	16 – 17	14,870	
21 March	2	Gold Coast Titans	WIN Stadium, Wollongong	16 – 10	13,329	
29 March	3	Cronulla-Sutherland Sharks	WIN Jubilee Oval, Kogarah	10 – 6	20,847	
3 April	4	Brisbane Broncos	Suncorp Stadium, Brisbane	25 – 12	42,435	
10 April	5	Parramatta Eels	Parramatta Stadium, Parramatta	22 – 8	19,017	
18 April	6	Newcastle Knights	WIN Jubilee Oval, Kogarah	18 – 24	14,477	
25 April	7	Sydney Roosters	Sydney Football Stadium, Sydney	29 – 0	28,926	
3 May	8	New Zealand Warriors	WIN Stadium, Wollongong	12 – 11	14,562	
9 May	9	North Queensland Cowboys	Dairy Farmers Stadium, Townsville	20 – 24	16,031	
15 May	10	Canterbury-Bankstown Bulldogs	WIN Jubilee Oval, Kogarah	20 – 18	18,415	
23 May	11	Cronulla-Sutherland Sharks	Toyota Stadium, Cronulla	26 – 4	15,201	
29 May	12	Penrith Panthers	WIN Stadium, Wollongong	38 – 10	10,623	
8 June	13	Gold Coast Titans	Skilled Park, Gold Coast	24 – 28	20,416	
14 June	14	North Queensland Cowboys	WIN Stadium, Wollongong	32 – 18	11,374	
	15					
26 June	16	Wests Tigers	Sydney Football Stadium, Sydney	21 – 10	15,211	
3 July	17	Sydney Roosters	WIN Jubilee Oval, Kogarah	34 – 12	12,472	
12 July	18	Manly-Warringah Sea Eagles	WIN Stadium, Wollongong	48 – 18	16,792	
	19					
26 July	20	New Zealand Warriors	Mount Smart Stadium, Auckland	29 – 4	13,507	
31 July	21	Melbourne Storm	WIN Jubilee Oval, Kogarah	26 – 12	16,474	
7 August	22	Penrith Panthers	Penrith Stadium, Penrith	25 – 6	19,987	
15 August	23	Canberra Raiders	Canberra Stadium, Canberra	12 – 24	17,044	
21 August	24	Brisbane Broncos	WIN Stadium, Wollongong	2 – 12	14,740	
29 August	25	South Sydney Rabbitohs	ANZ Stadium, Sydney	6 – 41	19,218	
4 September	26	Parramatta Eels	WIN Jubilee Oval, Kogarah	37 – 0	17,974	
Legend: Win Loss Draw Bye

== Finals ==
Date	Round	Opponent	Venue	Score	Attendance	Report
13 September	Qualifying Final	Parramatta Eels	WIN Jubilee Oval, Kogarah	12 – 25	18,174	
19 September	Semi-final	Brisbane Broncos	Suncorp Stadium, Brisbane	10 – 24	50,225	
Legend: Win Loss Draw

== 2009 NRL Ladder ==
2009 NRL season
Pos	Team	Pld	W	D	L	B	PF	PA	PD	Pts
1	St. George Illawarra Dragons	24	17	0	7	2	548	329	+219	38
2	Canterbury-Bankstown Bulldogs	24	18	0	6	2	575	428	+147	38^{1}
3	Gold Coast Titans	24	16	0	8	2	514	467	+47	36
4	Melbourne Storm	24	14	1	9	2	505	348	+157	33
5	Manly-Warringah Sea Eagles	24	14	0	10	2	549	459	+90	32
6	Brisbane Broncos	24	14	0	10	2	511	566	−55	32
7	Newcastle Knights	24	13	0	11	2	508	491	+17	30
8	Parramatta Eels	24	12	1	11	2	476	473	+3	29
9	Wests Tigers	24	12	0	12	2	558	483	+75	28
10	South Sydney Rabbitohs	24	11	1	12	2	566	549	+17	27
11	Penrith Panthers	24	11	1	12	2	515	589	−74	27
12	North Queensland Cowboys	24	11	0	13	2	558	474	+84	26
13	Canberra Raiders	24	9	0	15	2	489	520	−31	22
14	New Zealand Warriors	24	7	2	15	2	377	565	−188	20
15	Cronulla-Sutherland Sharks	24	5	0	19	2	359	568	−209	14
16	Sydney Roosters	24	5	0	19	2	382	681	−299	14

^{1} The Bulldogs were deducted 2 competition points after an interchange breach in Round 2.

== Squad ==
No.

Position
Player

Darius Boyd – FB Matt Cooper – CE Neville Costigan – SR Ben Creagh – SR Nick Emmett – CE Daniel Fepuleai – HK Jon Green – PR Mathew Head – HB Ben Hornby – HB Dan Hunt – PR Michael Lett – WG Brett Morris – WG Jason Nightingale – WG Mickey Paea – SR

No.

Position
Player

Justin Poore – PR Luke Priddis – HK Matt Prior – PR Alex Ranieri – HK Jarrod Saffy – SR Wendell Sailor – WG Beau Scott – PR Jeremy Smith – SR Jamie Soward – FE Chase Stanley – CE Ricky Thorby – PR Michael Weyman – PR Dean Young – LK Nathan Fien – HK

== Transfers ==
Gains

Player	Gained From
Darius Boyd	Brisbane Broncos
Neville Costigan	Canberra Raiders
Nick Emmett	Brisbane Broncos
Nathan Fien	New Zealand Warriors
Mathew Head	Wests Tigers
Mickey Paea	Sydney Roosters
Luke Priddis	Penrith Panthers
Jeremy Smith	Melbourne Storm
Michael Weyman	Canberra Raiders

Losses

Player	Lost To
Rangi Chase	Castleford Tigers
Mark Gasnier	Stade Français
Josh Morris	Canterbury Bulldogs
Kirk Reynoldson	Retirement
Ben Rogers	Newcastle Knights
Jason Ryles	Catalans Dragons
Lagi Setu	Brisbane Broncos
Simon Woolford	Retirement
