= 2009 Gold Coast Titans season =

Australian rugby league team season

Coordinates: 28°4′1″S 153°22′44″E

- NRL rank: 3rd
- 2009 record: Wins: 16; draws: 0; losses: 8
- Points scored: For: 514; against: 467

Team information
- CEO: Michael Searle
- Coach: John Cartwright
- Captain: Scott Prince
- Stadium: Skilled Park
- Avg. attendance: 19,178

Top scorers
- Goals: Scott Prince (73)
- Points: Scott Prince (174)
| ← 2008 | 2010 → |

The 2009 Gold Coast Titans season was the third in the club's history. They competed in the National Rugby League's 2009 Telstra Premiership, finishing the regular season 3rd (out of 16), and for the first time reached the finals only to be knocked out by eventual grand finalists, the Parramatta Eels.

== Fixtures ==
=== Regular season ===
| Round | Opponent | Result | Score | Venue | Date | Crowd |
|---|---|---|---|---|---|---|
| 1 | Newcastle Knights | Win | 34-20 | Skilled Park | 15/3/09 | 16,203 |
| 2 | St. George Illawarra Dragons | Loss | 16-10 | WIN Stadium | 21/3/09 | 13,329 |
| 3 | Bulldogs | Win | 20-12 | Skilled Park | 27/3/09 | 19,854 |
| 4 | Melbourne Storm | Win | 6-18 | Olympic Park | 04/4/09 | 11,698 |
| 5 | North Queensland Cowboys | Win | 10-14 | Dairy Farmers Stadium | 11/4/09 | 18,123 |
| 6 | Canberra Raiders | Win | 16-10 | Skilled Park | 17/4/09 | 18,510 |
| 7 | Penrith Panthers | Loss | 34-20 | CUA Stadium | 27/7/09 | 9,760 |
| 8 | South Sydney Rabbitohs | Win | 22-14 | Skilled Park | 2/5/09 | 19,833 |
| 9 | Newcastle Knights | Loss | 23-18 | Energy Australia Stadium | 10/5/09 | 11,258 |
| 10 | Brisbane Broncos | Loss | 32-18 | Suncorp Stadium | 15/5/09 | 43,083 |
| 11 | Manly Sea Eagles | Win | 18-17 | Skilled Park | 24/5/09 | 16,126 |
| 12 | Bye | | | | | |
| 13 | St. George Illawarra Dragons | Win | 28-24 | Skilled Park | 8/6/09 | 24,106 |
| 14 | Sydney Roosters | Win | 20-24 | Bluetongue Stadium | 13/6/09 | 6,232 |
| 15 | Bye | | | | | |
| 16 | New Zealand Warriors | Win | 28-12 | Skilled Park | 27/6/09 | 20,031 |
| 17 | Canberra Raiders | Loss | 34-28 | Canberra Stadium | 5/7/09 | 9,800 |
| 18 | Parramatta Eels | Win | 18-12 | Skilled Park | 13/7/09 | 14,840 |
| 19 | Bulldogs | Loss | 23-16 | Suncorp Stadium | 17/7/09 | 50,109 |
| 20 | Brisbane Broncos | Win | 34-18 | Skilled Park | 24/7/09 | 26,336 |
| 21 | North Queensland Cowboys | Loss | 18-34 | Skilled Park | 31/7/09 | 20,315 |
| 22 | New Zealand Warriors | Win | 10-30 | Mt Smart Stadium | 9/8/09 | 10,205 |
| 23 | South Sydney Rabbitohs | Win | 14-22 | ANZ Stadium | 14/8/09 | 11,977 |
| 24 | Cronulla Sharks | Win | 20-10 | Skilled Park | 23/8/09 | 13,714 |
| 25 | Wests Tigers | Win | 36-24 | Skilled Park | 29/8/09 | 20,102 |
| 26 | Manly Sea Eagles | Loss | 38-4 | Brookvale Oval | 5/9/09 | 14,165 |
| FW1 | Brisbane Broncos | Loss | 32-40 | Skilled Park | 13/9/09 | 27,227 |
| FW2 | Parramatta Eels | Loss | 27-2 | Sydney Football Stadium | 18/9/09 | 28,524 |

== Records ==
=== Most Points ===
- 182 - Scott Prince (7 tries, 77 goals)
- 58 - Mat Rogers (11 tries, 7 goals)
- 52 - Kevin Gordon (13 tries)
- 32 - Chris Walker (8 tries)
- 32 - David Mead (8 tries)

=== Most Tries ===
- 13 - Kevin Gordon
- 11 - Mat Rogers
- 8 - Chris Walker
- 8 - David Mead
- 7 - Scott Prince
- 6 - Luke O'Dwyer
- 6 - Esi Tonga
- 5 - Anthony Laffranchi
- 5 - Preston Campbell

=== Most Points in a Match ===
- 20 - Scott Prince Round 25 (2 tries, 6 goals)
- 14 - Scott Prince Round 20 (1 try, 5 goals)
- 14 - Scott Prince Round 22 (1 try, 5 goals)
- 10 - Mat Rogers Round 4 (5 goals)

=== Most Tries in a Match ===
- 2 - Brad Meyers Round 13
- 2 - Kevin Gordon Round 16
- 2 - David Mead Round 16
- 2 - David Mead Round 17
- 2 - Mat Rogers Round 19
- 2 - Mat Rogers Round 22

== Available 2009 Players ==
Bold Players have played International or State any year

Full Backs
Preston Campbell
William Zillman

Wingers
Jordan Atkins
Ben Jeffery
Brenton Bowen
Shannon Walker
Chris Walker
Kevin Gordon
David Mead

Centres
Brett Delaney
Josh Graham
Esi Tonga

Halves
Scott Prince (c)
Mat Rogers
Brad Davis
Jackson Nicolau
Jordan Rankin

Hookers
Nathan Friend
Ian Lacey
Kayne Lawton

Props
Luke Bailey (c)
Brad Meyers
Michael Henderson
Matthew White
Aaron Cannings
Selasi Berdie
Will Matthews
Bodene Thompson
Siosaia Vave

Second Rowers/Locks
Anthony Laffranchi
Mark Minichiello
Ashley Harrison
Luke O'Dwyer
Daniel Conn
Sam Tagataese

== 2009 Squad ==
| No | Nat | Player | Position | Age | NRL Games | Previous 1st Grade Club |
|---|---|---|---|---|---|---|
| 1 | (Australia) | Preston Campbell | Fullback | 31 | 204 | Penrith Panthers |
| 2 | (Australia) | Jordan Atkins | Wing | 26 | 14 | None |
| 3 | (Australia) | William Zillman | Centre | 22 | 24 | Canberra Raiders |
| 4 | (Australia) | Brett Delaney | Centre | 23 | 62 | Parramatta Eels |
| 5 | (Australia) | Chris Walker | Wing | 29 | 131 | Melbourne Storm |
| 6 | (Australia) | Mat Rogers | Five Eighth | 33 | 159 | New South Wales Waratahs |
| 7 | (Australia) | Scott Prince (c) | Halfback | 29 | 192 | Wests Tigers |
| 8 | (Australia) | Luke Bailey (c) | Prop | 29 | 150 | St. George-Illawarra Dragons |
| 9 | (Australia) | Nathan Friend | Hooker | 28 | 79 | Melbourne Storm |
| 10 | (Australia) | Michael Henderson | Prop | 24 | 52 | St. George-Illawarra Dragons |
| 11 | (Australia) | Anthony Laffranchi | Second Row | 28 | 142 | Wests Tigers |
| 12 | (Australia) | Mark Minichiello | Second Row | 27 | 126 | South Sydney Rabbitohs |
| 13 | (Australia) | Ashley Harrison | Lock | 27 | 179 | Sydney Roosters |
| 14 | (Australia) | Brad Meyers | Prop | 29 | 171 | Bradford Bulls |
| 15 | (New Zealand) | Billy Ngawini | Hooker | 27 | 4 | Canterbury Bulldogs |
| 16 | (Tonga) | Aaron Cannings | Prop | 27 | 82 | Parramatta Eels |
| 17 | (Australia) | Luke O'Dwyer | Second Row | 26 | 56 | Parramatta Eels |
| 19 | (Australia) | Josh Graham | Centre | 25 | 35 | Melbourne Storm |
| 20 | (Australia) | Ben Jeffery | Wing | 22 | 23 | Wests Tigers |
| 21 | (Australia) | Brenton Bowen | Wing | 25 | 50 | North Queensland Cowboys |
| 22 | (Australia) | Shannon Walker | Wing | 20 | 3 | None |
| 23 | (Australia) | Kevin Gordon | Wing | 19 | 0 | None |
| 24 | (Papua New Guinea) | David Mead | Wing | 20 | 0 | None |
| 25 | (Tonga) | Esi Tonga | Centre | 21 | 5 | None |
| 26 | (Australia) | Jackson Nicolau | Five-Eighth | 21 | 2 | North Queensland Cowboys |
| 27 | (Australia) | Brad Davis | Halfback | 26 | 6 | None |
| 28 | (Australia) | Jordan Rankin | Halfback | 17 | 1 | None |
| 29 | (Australia) | Kayne Lawton | Hooker | 19 | 0 | None |
| 30 | (Australia) | Matthew White | Prop | 24 | 28 | Newcastle Knights |
| 32 | (Australia) | Will Matthews | Prop | 20 | 9 | None |
| 33 | (Australia) | Daniel Conn | Lock | 23 | 27 | Canterbury Bulldogs |
| 34 | (Samoa) | Sam Tagataese | Second Row | 22 | 18 | Melbourne Storm |
| 35 | (Ghana) | Selasi Berdie | Second Row | 22 | 1 | None |
| 36 | (Australia) | Ian Lacey | Hooker | 24 | 15 | Brisbane Broncos |

== Player Transfers ==
=== Gains ===
| Name | Club Coming From | Details |
|---|---|---|
| William Zillman | Canberra Raiders | Until 2012 |
| Matthew White | Newcastle Knights | Until 2009 |
| Sam Tagataese | Melbourne Storm | Until 2010 |
| Jackson Nicolau | North Queensland Cowboys | |
| Ian Lacey | Unassigned | |

=== Losses ===
| Name | Club Going To | Details |
|---|---|---|
| Michael Hodgson | Canterbury Bulldogs | Until 2010 |
| Josh Lewis | Wests Tigers | Until 2009 |
| Clint Amos | North Queensland Cowboys | Until 2010 |
| Gavin Cooper | Penrith Panthers | Until 2010 |
| Matthew Cross | Melbourne Storm | Until 2010 |
| Luke Swain | Salford City Reds - ESL | |
| James Stosic | Wakefield Trinity Wildcats - ESL | |
| Kris Kahler | Pia Donkeys | |
| Smith Samau Mid-Season | Sydney Roosters | |
| Ian Donnelly Mid-Season | Cronulla Sharks | |

=== Off Contract ===
Chris Walker

Brenton Bowen

Ben Jeffery

== Ladder ==
2009 NRL season
| Pos | Team | Pld | W | D | L | B | PF | PA | PD | Pts |
|---|---|---|---|---|---|---|---|---|---|---|
| 1 | St. George Illawarra Dragons | 24 | 17 | 0 | 7 | 2 | 548 | 329 | +219 | 38 |
| 2 | Canterbury-Bankstown Bulldogs | 24 | 18 | 0 | 6 | 2 | 575 | 428 | +147 | 38^{1} |
| 3 | Gold Coast Titans | 24 | 16 | 0 | 8 | 2 | 514 | 467 | +47 | 36 |
| 4 | Melbourne Storm | 24 | 14 | 1 | 9 | 2 | 505 | 348 | +157 | 33 |
| 5 | Manly-Warringah Sea Eagles | 24 | 14 | 0 | 10 | 2 | 549 | 459 | +90 | 32 |
| 6 | Brisbane Broncos | 24 | 14 | 0 | 10 | 2 | 511 | 566 | −55 | 32 |
| 7 | Newcastle Knights | 24 | 13 | 0 | 11 | 2 | 508 | 491 | +17 | 30 |
| 8 | Parramatta Eels | 24 | 12 | 1 | 11 | 2 | 476 | 473 | +3 | 29 |
| 9 | Wests Tigers | 24 | 12 | 0 | 12 | 2 | 558 | 483 | +75 | 28 |
| 10 | South Sydney Rabbitohs | 24 | 11 | 1 | 12 | 2 | 566 | 549 | +17 | 27 |
| 11 | Penrith Panthers | 24 | 11 | 1 | 12 | 2 | 515 | 589 | −74 | 27 |
| 12 | North Queensland Cowboys | 24 | 11 | 0 | 13 | 2 | 558 | 474 | +84 | 26 |
| 13 | Canberra Raiders | 24 | 9 | 0 | 15 | 2 | 489 | 520 | −31 | 22 |
| 14 | New Zealand Warriors | 24 | 7 | 2 | 15 | 2 | 377 | 565 | −188 | 20 |
| 15 | Cronulla-Sutherland Sharks | 24 | 5 | 0 | 19 | 2 | 359 | 568 | −209 | 14 |
| 16 | Sydney Roosters | 24 | 5 | 0 | 19 | 2 | 382 | 681 | −299 | 14 |

^{1} The Bulldogs were deducted 2 competition points after an interchange breach in Round 2.
