= 2009 NRL season =

102nd season of National Rugby League

2009 National Rugby League
- Teams: 16
- Premiers: None
- Minor premiers: St. George Illawarra (1st title)
- Matches played: 201
- Points scored: 8315
- Average attendance: 16,980
- Total attendance: 3,412,872
- Top points scorer: Hazem El Masri (248)
- Wooden spoon: Sydney Roosters (5th spoon)
- Dally M Medal: Jarryd Hayne
- Top try-scorer: Brett Morris (25)

The 2009 NRL season was the 102nd season of professional rugby league football club competition in Australia, and the twelfth run by the National Rugby League. For the third consecutive year, sixteen teams competed for the 2009 Telstra Premiership title. The season commenced with the first match played on 13 March and ended with the grand final, played on 4 October. The Grand Final was won by the Melbourne Storm in their fourth consecutive grand final appearance. However, they were stripped of their Premiership on 22 April 2010 after they were found to be guilty of breaching the league's salary cap. The St. George Illawarra Dragons retained the minor premiership that they won, but the finals series was retroactively declared null and void.

The second season of the National Youth Competition also commenced in line with the Telstra Premiership.

== Season summary ==
This season the NRL introduced a second on-field referee. Previously when the ball changed possession the lone on-field referee would have to change his position to stay with the defending team. He also could only observe the ruck from one direction. The two-referee system saves the referees some running back and forth to get into position as possession changes and also improves watchfulness over the ruck.

The Manly Warringah Sea Eagles began their premiership title defense in horrific fashion, losing their first four games, before a stunning revival led to them losing only four of their final 16 regular season games. The St. George Illawarra Dragons, under new coach Wayne Bennett finished the regular season with their first minor premiership title as a joint venture club. However, the Dragons then became the first minor premiers since the Canterbury-Bankstown Bulldogs in 1993 to be eliminated from the final series in consecutive losses.

For the first time since the McIntyre final eight system was introduced, a game was played twice in a row in the same stadium. This happened when St. George Illawarra and Parramatta Eels played each other in round 26 (the final regular season round) and again in the first week of finals, both at WIN Jubilee Oval at Kogarah. The first game saw St. George Illawarra come away with a 37–0 win in front of 17,974, while the next weeks Qualifying final saw Parramatta reverse the result with a 25–12 win in front of 18,174.

Parramatta went on to become the first side since the McIntyre final eight system was introduced (in 1999) to make the grand final from eighth position. Along the way, they defeated the top three teams – the St. George Illawarra Dragons, Gold Coast Titans and Canterbury – in their three finals series matches, to make it to their first Grand Final since 2001. Their Grand Final opponents, the Melbourne Storm, were playing in their fourth straight Grand Final and were looking for their third premiership having previously won in 1999 and 2007.

In 2009, NRL games on New Zealand's Sky network drew average audiences of 46,221.

=== Records set in 2009 ===
- Canterbury winger Hazem El Masri broke the all-time highest points record of 2,176 previously set by former Newcastle Knights halfback Andrew Johns when he scored 14 points against Manly-Warringah Sea Eagles in Round 1.
- St George Illawarra Dragons winger Brett Morris and his twin, Canterbury centre Josh Morris, set the record for the most tries scored by brothers in a regular season (42). The pair record a further five tries between them in the finals series, with Brett scoring 25 to Josh's 22.
- The Brisbane Broncos suffered their worst defeat in their 22-year history losing 56–0 to the Canberra Raiders in round 21 at Canberra Stadium.
- A record finals attendance (excluding grand finals) was set when Parramatta and Canterbury preliminary final drew a crowd of 74,549 at ANZ Stadium. With the exception of all Grand Finals played at ANZ since 1999, and the 1965 Grand Final at the Sydney Cricket Ground, this remains the highest attendance for any game since the premiership began in 1908.
- Cameron Smith became the Melbourne Storm's leading point scorer, overtaking now-Sea Eagles half Matt Orford in the preliminary final against the Brisbane Broncos.
- The Melbourne Storm became the first club since the Parramatta sides of the 1981, 1982, 1983 and 1984 seasons to make four consecutive grand finals.
- The Parramatta Eels were the first team ever under the McIntyre system to finish 8th in the regular season and make it to the grand final.

=== Advertising ===
Keen to speak to its grass roots following in light of the AFL's aggressive expansion in rugby league's suburban heartland the NRL and its agency MJW Hakuhodo created a TVC which tells the story of junior rugby league players enjoying the game and perhaps becoming stars of the future. The commercial featured two young boys playing league in a suburban park. As they contest the game, they morph into stars of the League as a packed stadium emerges around them. Seven-year-old Penrith junior Cameron Lloyd and 14-year-old La Perouse junior Alex Johnston play the main roles in the campaign with Johnson morphing into Melbourne's Greg Inglis scoring a try in corner in a big match. Announcing the 2009 launch TVC

The ad's strapline was "Feel It" and the soundtrack a re-worked version of 2008 Australian Idol winner Wes Carr's "Feels Like Whoa."

== Teams ==
The clubs in the League for 2009 remained unchanged for the third consecutive year, with sixteen participating in the regular season: ten from New South Wales, three from Queensland and one from each of Victoria, the Australian Capital Territory and New Zealand. Of the ten from New South Wales, eight were from Sydney's metropolitan area (with St. George Illawarra being a Sydney and Wollongong joint venture). Just two foundation clubs from the 1908 New South Wales Rugby Football League season played in this competition: the Roosters and the Rabbitohs.

Brisbane Broncos; 22nd season Ground: Suncorp Stadium; Coach: Ivan Henjak; Captain: Darren Lockyer	Bulldogs; 75th season Ground: ANZ Stadium; Coach: Kevin Moore; Captain: Andrew Ryan	Canberra Raiders; 28th season Ground: Canberra Stadium; Coach: David Furner; Captain: Alan Tongue	Cronulla-Sutherland Sharks; 43rd season Ground: Toyota Stadium; Coach: Ricky Stuart; Captain: Paul Gallen → Trent Barrett
Gold Coast Titans; 3rd season Ground: Skilled Park; Coach: John Cartwright; Captain: Scott Prince & Luke Bailey	Manly Warringah Sea Eagles; 60th season Ground: Brookvale Oval; Coach: Des Hasler; Captain: Matt Orford	Melbourne Storm; 12th season Ground Olympic Park Stadium; Coach: Craig Bellamy; Captain: Cameron Smith	New Zealand Warriors; 15th season Ground: Mt. Smart Stadium; Coach: Ivan Cleary; Captain: Steve Price
Newcastle Knights; 22nd season Ground: EnergyAustralia Stadium; Coach: Brian Smith → Rick Stone; Captain: Kurt Gidley	North Queensland Cowboys; 15th season Ground: Dairy Farmers Stadium; Coach: Neil Henry; Captain: Johnathan Thurston	Parramatta Eels; 63rd season Ground: Parramatta Stadium; Coach: Daniel Anderson; Captain: Nathan Cayless	Penrith Panthers; 43rd season Ground: CUA Stadium; Coach: Matthew Elliott; Captain: Petero Civoniceva
South Sydney Rabbitohs; 100th season Ground: ANZ Stadium; Coach: Jason Taylor; Captain: Roy Asotasi	St. George Illawarra Dragons; 11th season Ground: WIN Jubilee Oval & WIN Stadium; Coach: Wayne Bennett; Captain: Ben Hornby	Sydney Roosters; 102nd season Ground: Sydney Football Stadium; Coach: Brad Fittler; Captain: Braith Anasta	Wests Tigers; 10th season Grounds: Campbelltown Stadium & Leichhardt Oval; Coach: Tim Sheens; Captain: Robbie Farah

== Ladder ==
2009 NRL season
Pos	Team	Pld	W	D	L	B	PF	PA	PD	Pts
1	St. George Illawarra Dragons	24	17	0	7	2	548	329	+219	38
2	Canterbury-Bankstown Bulldogs	24	18	0	6	2	575	428	+147	38^{1}
3	Gold Coast Titans	24	16	0	8	2	514	467	+47	36
4	Melbourne Storm	24	14	1	9	2	505	348	+157	33
5	Manly-Warringah Sea Eagles	24	14	0	10	2	549	459	+90	32
6	Brisbane Broncos	24	14	0	10	2	511	566	−55	32
7	Newcastle Knights	24	13	0	11	2	508	491	+17	30
8	Parramatta Eels	24	12	1	11	2	476	473	+3	29
9	Wests Tigers	24	12	0	12	2	558	483	+75	28
10	South Sydney Rabbitohs	24	11	1	12	2	566	549	+17	27
11	Penrith Panthers	24	11	1	12	2	515	589	−74	27
12	North Queensland Cowboys	24	11	0	13	2	558	474	+84	26
13	Canberra Raiders	24	9	0	15	2	489	520	−31	22
14	New Zealand Warriors	24	7	2	15	2	377	565	−188	20
15	Cronulla-Sutherland Sharks	24	5	0	19	2	359	568	−209	14
16	Sydney Roosters	24	5	0	19	2	382	681	−299	14

^{1} The Bulldogs were deducted 2 competition points after an interchange breach in Round 2.

=== Ladder progression ===
- Numbers highlighted in green indicate that the team finished the round inside the top 8.
- Numbers highlighted in blue indicates the team finished first on the ladder in that round.
- Numbers highlighted in red indicates the team finished in last place on the ladder in that round
- Underlined numbers indicate that the team had a bye during that round.

	Team	1	2	3	4	5	6	7	8	9	10	11	12	13	14	15	16	17	18	19	20	21	22	23	24	25	26
1	St. George Illawarra	0	2	4	6	8	8	10	12	12	14	16	18	18	20	22	24	26	28	30	32	34	36	36	36	36	38
2	Bulldogs	2	2	2	4	6	8	10	12	14	14	16	16	18	20	22	24	24	26	28	28	30	32	34	36	38	38
3	Gold Coast	2	2	4	6	8	10	10	12	12	12	14	16	18	20	22	24	24	26	26	28	28	30	32	34	36	36
4	Melbourne	2	2	4	4	6	6	7	9	11	13	13	15	17	19	21	21	23	25	25	27	27	29	29	29	31	33
5	Manly-Warringah	0	0	0	0	2	4	4	4	6	8	8	10	12	14	16	18	20	22	24	24	24	24	26	28	30	32
6	Brisbane	2	4	6	6	8	10	12	12	12	14	16	18	18	18	18	18	20	22	22	22	22	24	26	28	30	32
7	Newcastle	0	2	2	4	6	8	8	10	12	14	14	16	16	16	18	20	20	22	24	24	24	24	26	28	28	30
8	Parramatta	0	2	4	4	4	4	4	6	8	8	9	9	11	11	13	15	15	15	17	19	21	23	25	27	29	29
9	Wests	2	2	4	4	4	6	8	8	10	10	10	10	10	12	12	12	14	16	18	20	22	24	26	26	26	28
10	South Sydney	2	2	4	6	6	6	8	8	10	12	13	13	13	13	15	15	15	17	19	21	21	23	23	23	25	27
11	Penrith	0	0	2	4	4	4	6	8	10	12	14	14	16	16	16	18	20	20	22	24	25	25	25	27	27	27
12	North Queensland	0	2	2	2	2	4	6	6	8	10	12	14	16	16	18	18	20	22	22	22	24	24	24	24	24	26
13	Canberra	0	0	0	2	4	4	4	4	6	6	8	10	12	12	12	14	16	16	16	16	18	18	20	20	22	22
14	New Zealand	2	4	4	4	4	6	7	7	9	9	9	11	11	13	15	15	15	15	17	17	18	18	18	20	20	20
15	Cronulla-Sutherland	2	2	2	2	2	2	2	2	4	4	4	6	8	10	12	12	12	14	14	14	14	14	14	14	14	14
16	Sydney	0	2	2	4	4	4	4	6	6	6	6	8	8	8	8	10	10	12	12	12	14	14	14	14	14	14

== Finals series ==
The NRL finals series adopted the McIntyre final eight system. Four teams made a return to the 2009 finals from 2008, grand finalists Melbourne Storm, Manly-Warringah Sea Eagles along with the Brisbane Broncos and St George Illawarra Dragons. Both the Bulldogs and Parramatta Eels made a return after being absent in 2008. The Newcastle Knights made the finals for the first time since 2006 and their first since the departure of club legend Andrew Johns. The Gold Coast Titans entered their maiden finals series. It was also the first finals series since 2002 that no team was held scoreless.

Home	Score	Away	Match Information
Home	Score	Away	Date and Time	Venue	Referees	Crowd
QUALIFYING FINALS
Melbourne Storm	40 – 12	Manly Warringah Sea Eagles	11 September, 7:45pm	Etihad Stadium	Gavin Badger; Shayne Hayne	21,155
Gold Coast Titans	32 – 40	Brisbane Broncos	12 September, 6:30pm	Skilled Park	Ben Cummins; Ashley Klein	27,227
Canterbury-Bankstown Bulldogs	26 – 12	Newcastle Knights	12 September, 8:30pm	ANZ Stadium	Tony Archer; Jason Robinson	21,369
St. George Illawarra Dragons	12 – 25	Parramatta Eels	13 September, 4:00pm	WIN Jubilee Oval	Jarred Maxwell; Matt Cecchin	18,174
SEMI FINALS
Parramatta Eels	27 – 2	Gold Coast Titans	18 September, 7:45pm	Sydney Football Stadium	Shayne Hayne; Jared Maxwell	28,524
Brisbane Broncos	24 – 10	St. George Illawarra Dragons	19 September, 7:45pm	Suncorp Stadium	Tony Archer; Ben Cummins	50,225
PRELIMINARY FINALS
Canterbury-Bankstown Bulldogs	12 – 22	Parramatta Eels	25 September, 7:45pm	ANZ Stadium	Tony Archer; Ben Cummins	74,549
Melbourne Storm	40 – 10	Brisbane Broncos	26 September, 7:45pm	Etihad Stadium	Shayne Hayne; Jared Maxwell	27,687

Qualifying finals
1	St. George Illawarra	12
8	Parramatta	25
2	Bulldogs	26
7	Newcastle	12
3	Gold Coast	32
6	Brisbane	40
4	Melbourne	40
5	Manly	12

Semifinals
4W	Parramatta	27
2L	Gold Coast	2
3W	Brisbane	24
1L	St. George Illawarra	10

Preliminary finals
1W	Bulldogs	12
Parramatta	22
2W	Melbourne	40
Brisbane	10

Final
Parramatta	16
Melbourne	23

== Grand final ==
Sunday, 4 October
17:00

Melbourne Storm	23 – 16	Parramatta Eels
Tries: Adam Blair; Ryan Hoffman; Greg Inglis; Billy Slater; Goals: Cameron Smith (3/4); Field goals: Greg Inglis (1/1)	Report	Tries: Eric Grothe, Jr. Fuifui Moimoi; Joel Reddy Goals: Luke Burt (2/3)

ANZ Stadium, Sydney
Attendance: 82,538
Referee: Tony Archer & Shayne Hayne
Player of the Match: Billy Slater

== Club and Player records ==
The following figures were collected from the completion of round 26 of the regular season and therefore do not represent any figures associated with the finals series or any representative matches for this year.

Top 5 point scorers

Pts	Player	Try	Gls	FG
234	Hazem El Masri	14	89	0
228	Jamie Soward	12	87	6
202	Johnathan Thurston	11	79	0
180	Luke Burt	13	63	2
172	Scott Prince	7	72	0

Top 5 try scorers

Try	Player
22	Brett Morris
21	Taniela Tuiaki
20	Josh Morris
19	Nathan Merritt
19	Bryson Goodwin

Most points in a match by an individual

Pts	Player	Try	Gls	FG	Opponent	Score	Venue	Round
24	Luke Burt	2	8/8	0	Newcastle Knights	40–8	Parramatta Stadium	Round 22
24	Luke Burt	2	8/8	0	Penrith Panthers	48–6	Parramatta Stadium	Round 25
24	Benji Marshall	2	8/10	0	Cronulla Sharks	56–10	Toyota Stadium	Round 23
24	Joe Tomane	3	6/9	0	Brisbane Broncos	48–4	Olympic Park Stadium	Round 13

Most tries in a match by an individual

Tries	Player	Opponent	Score	Venue	Round
4	Israel Folau	Gold Coast Titans	32–18	Suncorp Stadium	Round 10
4	Phil Graham	Brisbane Broncos	56–0	Canberra Stadium	Round 21
4	Joel Moon	Penrith Panthers	32–32	CUA Stadium	Round 21
4	Brett Morris	North Queensland	20–24	Dairy Farmers Stadium	Round 9
4	Billy Slater	Manly Sea Eagles	40–12	Etihad Stadium	Qualifying Final

Largest winning margin

Score	Victor	Opponent	Venue	Round
56 – 0 (56 pts)	Canberra Raiders	Brisbane Broncos	Canberra Stadium	Round 21
56 – 10 (46 pts)	Wests Tigers	Cronulla Sharks	Toyota Stadium	Round 23
48 – 4 (44 pts)	Melbourne Storm	Brisbane Broncos	Olympic Park	Round 13

Most points in a match

Points	Victor	Opponent	Score	Venue	Round
82	Brisbane Broncos	Penrith Panthers	58–24	Suncorp Stadium	Round 23
74	Wests Tigers	South Sydney Rabbitohs	54–20	ANZ Stadium	Round 17
72	Penrith Panthers	Parramatta Eels	38–34	CUA Stadium	Round 17

Fewest points in a match

Points	Victor	Opponent	Score	Venue	Round
13	New Zealand Warriors	Newcastle Knights	13–0	Mt Smart Stadium	Round 14
14	New Zealand Warriors	Wests Tigers	14–0	Mt Smart Stadium	Round 12
14	Brisbane Broncos	St. George Illawarra Dragons	12–2	WIN Stadium	Round 24
16	St. George Illawarra Dragons	Cronulla Sharks	10–6	WIN Jubilee Oval	Round 3

Most points scored in a match by an individual team

Pts	Team	Opponent	Score	Venue	Round
58	Brisbane Broncos	Penrith Panthers	58–24	Suncorp Stadium	Round 23
56	Wests Tigers	Cronulla Sharks	56–10	Toyota Stadium	Round 23
56	Canberra Raiders	Brisbane Broncos	56–0	Canberra Stadium	Round 21
54	Wests Tigers	South Sydney Rabbitohs	54–20	ANZ Stadium	Round 17
52	South Sydney Rabbitohs	Sydney Roosters	52–12	Sydney Football Stadium	Round 1

- More NRL statistics

Jarryd Hayne ran 4,429 metres with the ball in 2009, more than any other player in the competition.

== Attendance ==
2009's regular season attendance figures were the highest recorded in Australian rugby league history, with a total of 3,081,849. This figure bettered the previous record set by the 1995 Winfield Cup's regular season (3,061,338 in a 20 team competition) and also beat the Telstra Premiership's previous best of 3,024,149 set in 2007.

The 2009 season also saw the second highest average crowd figure of a regular season, with a crowd average of 16,051, behind the best of 16,466 set in the 2005 NRL season.

The 20 highest regular season match attendances:

Crowd	Venue	Home Team	Opponent	Round
50,109	Suncorp Stadium (Double Header)	Brisbane Broncos; Bulldogs RLFC	South Sydney Rabbitohs; Gold Coast Titans	Round 19
45,022	Suncorp Stadium	Brisbane Broncos	North Queensland Cowboys	Round 1
43,079	Suncorp Stadium	Brisbane Broncos	Gold Coast Titans	Round 10
42,435	Suncorp Stadium	Brisbane Broncos	St George Illawarra Dragons	Round 4
41,835	ANZ Stadium	Bulldogs RLFC	New Zealand Warriors	Round 25
36,647	Suncorp Stadium	Brisbane Broncos	Melbourne Storm	Round 2
35,112	Suncorp Stadium	Brisbane Broncos	Canberra Raiders	Round 26
34,272	Sydney Football Stadium	Wests Tigers	Parramatta Eels	Round 24
32,456	Suncorp Stadium	Brisbane Broncos	New Zealand Warriors	Round 17
31,664	ANZ Stadium	Bulldogs RLFC	Parramatta Eels	Round 20
30,887	Suncorp Stadium	Brisbane Broncos	Parramatta Eels	Round 7
29,970	Sydney Cricket Ground	Wests Tigers	South Sydney Rabbitohs	Round 10
28,926	Sydney Football Stadium	Sydney Roosters	St George Illawarra Dragons	Round 7
27,527	Suncorp Stadium	Brisbane Broncos	Manly-Warringah Sea Eagles	Round 9
26,353	Suncorp Stadium	Brisbane Broncos	Bulldogs RLFC	Round 14
26,336	Skilled Park	Gold Coast Titans	Brisbane Broncos	Round 20
25,622	ANZ Stadium	Bulldogs RLFC	Wests Tigers	Round 8
25,305	Suncorp Stadium	Brisbane Broncos	Penrith Panthers	Round 23
24,538	Mt Smart Stadium	New Zealand Warriors	Brisbane Broncos	Round 3
24,486	Sydney Football Stadium	Sydney Roosters	South Sydney Rabbitohs	Round 1
24,332	Dairy Farmers Stadium	North Queensland Cowboys	Brisbane Broncos	Round 25

== 2009 Transfers ==
=== Players ===
Player	2008 Club	2009 Club
Darius Boyd	Brisbane Broncos	St. George Illawarra Dragons
Greg Eastwood	Brisbane Broncos	Canterbury-Bankstown Bulldogs
Michael Ennis	Brisbane Broncos	Canterbury-Bankstown Bulldogs
Ben Hannant	Brisbane Broncos	Canterbury-Bankstown Bulldogs
Denan Kemp	Brisbane Broncos	New Zealand Warriors
Joel Moon	Brisbane Broncos	New Zealand Warriors
Shane Perry	Brisbane Broncos	Super League: Catalans Dragons
David Stagg	Brisbane Broncos	Canterbury-Bankstown Bulldogs
Colin Best	Canberra Raiders	South Sydney Rabbitohs
Marshall Chalk	Canberra Raiders	Super League: Celtic Crusaders
Neville Costigan	Canberra Raiders	St. George Illawarra Dragons
Bronx Goodwin	Canberra Raiders	Cronulla-Sutherland Sharks
Michael Weyman	Canberra Raiders	St. George Illawarra Dragons
William Zillman	Canberra Raiders	Gold Coast Titans
Andrew Emelio	Canterbury-Bankstown Bulldogs	Penrith Panthers
Corey Hughes	Canterbury-Bankstown Bulldogs	Cronulla-Sutherland Sharks
Nick Kouparitsas	Canterbury-Bankstown Bulldogs	Sydney Roosters
Reni Maitua	Canterbury-Bankstown Bulldogs	Cronulla-Sutherland Sharks
Willie Tonga	Canterbury-Bankstown Bulldogs	North Queensland Cowboys
Sonny Bill Williams	Canterbury-Bankstown Bulldogs	RC Toulonnais (French rugby union)
Nick Youngquest	Canterbury-Bankstown Bulldogs	Gateshead Thunder
Fraser Anderson	Cronulla-Sutherland Sharks	Kobelco Steelers (Japanese rugby union)
Greg Bird	Cronulla-Sutherland Sharks	Super League: Catalans Dragons
Dustin Cooper	Cronulla-Sutherland Sharks	Toyota Verblitz (Japanese rugby union)
Isaac De Gois	Cronulla-Sutherland Sharks	Newcastle Knights
Brett Kimmorley	Cronulla-Sutherland Sharks	Canterbury-Bankstown Bulldogs
Kevin Kingston	Cronulla-Sutherland Sharks	Parramatta Eels
Danny Nutley	Cronulla-Sutherland Sharks	Retirement
Adam Peek	Cronulla-Sutherland Sharks	Super League: Celtic Crusaders
Paul Stephenson	Cronulla-Sutherland Sharks	Ipswich Jets (Queensland Cup)
Lance Thompson	Cronulla-Sutherland Sharks	Retirement
Clint Amos	Gold Coast Titans	North Queensland Cowboys
Brenton Bowen	Gold Coast Titans	Tweed Heads Seagulls (Queensland Cup)
Gavin Cooper	Gold Coast Titans	Penrith Panthers
Matthew Cross	Gold Coast Titans	Melbourne Storm
Ian Donnelly	Gold Coast Titans	Cronulla-Sutherland Sharks
Michael Hodgson	Gold Coast Titans	Canterbury-Bankstown Bulldogs
Matt Petersen	Gold Coast Titans	Super League: Wakefield Trinity Wildcats
James Stosic	Gold Coast Titans	Super League: Wakefield Trinity Wildcats
Luke Swain	Gold Coast Titans	Super League: Salford City Reds
Jack Afamasaga	Manly Warringah Sea Eagles	Cronulla-Sutherland Sharks
Steven Bell	Manly Warringah Sea Eagles	Super League: Catalans Dragons
Nick Bradley-Qalilawa	Manly Warringah Sea Eagles	Retirement
Mark Bryant	Manly Warringah Sea Eagles	Super League: Celtic Crusaders
Steve Menzies	Manly Warringah Sea Eagles	Super League: Bradford Bulls
David Vaealiki	Manly Warringah Sea Eagles	SC Albi (French rugby union)
Luke Williamson	Manly Warringah Sea Eagles	Super League: Harlequins RL
Michael Crocker	Melbourne Storm	South Sydney Rabbitohs
Israel Folau	Melbourne Storm	Brisbane Broncos
Matt Geyer	Melbourne Storm	Retirement
Antonio Kaufusi	Melbourne Storm	North Queensland Cowboys
Jeremy Smith	Melbourne Storm	St. George Illawarra Dragons
Chris Bailey	Newcastle Knights	Manly Warringah Sea Eagles
Danny Buderus	Newcastle Knights	Super League: Leeds Rhinos
Jesse Royal	Newcastle Knights	New Zealand Warriors
Matthew White	Newcastle Knights	Gold Coast Titans
Wairangi Koopu	New Zealand Warriors	Melbourne Storm
Grant Rovelli	New Zealand Warriors	North Queensland Cowboys
Logan Swann	New Zealand Warriors	Retirement
Ruben Wiki	New Zealand Warriors	Retirement
Michael Witt	New Zealand Warriors	Otago (New Zealand rugby union)
Daniel Abraham	North Queensland Cowboys	Mackay Cutters (Queensland Cup)
Ray Cashmere	North Queensland Cowboys	Super League: Salford City Reds
David Faiumu	North Queensland Cowboys	Super League: Huddersfield Giants
Sione Faumuina	North Queensland Cowboys	Super League: Castleford Tigers
Mark Henry	North Queensland Cowboys	Super League: Salford City Reds
Jacob Lillyman	North Queensland Cowboys	New Zealand Warriors
Chris Sheppard	North Queensland Cowboys	Northern Pride (Queensland Cup)
Justin Smith	North Queensland Cowboys	Retirement
Brett Finch	Parramatta Eels	Melbourne Storm
Mark Riddell	Parramatta Eels	Super League: Wigan Warriors
Chad Robinson	Parramatta Eels	Super League: Harlequins RL
Daniel Wagon	Parramatta Eels	Limoux Grizzlies (Elite One Championship)
Mark O'Halloran	Penrith Panthers	Retirement
Luke Priddis	Penrith Panthers	St. George Illawarra Dragons
Tony Puletua	Penrith Panthers	Super League: St. Helens
Shane Rodney	Penrith Panthers	Manly Warringah Sea Eagles
Luke Rooney	Penrith Panthers	RC Toulonnais (French rugby union)
Rhys Wesser	Penrith Panthers	South Sydney Rabbitohs
Yileen Gordon	South Sydney Rabbitohs	Canterbury-Bankstown Bulldogs
Shannon Hegarty	South Sydney Rabbitohs	North Queensland Cowboys
Manase Manuokafoa	South Sydney Rabbitohs	North Queensland Cowboys
Nigel Vagana	South Sydney Rabbitohs	Retirement
Dean Widders	South Sydney Rabbitohs	Super League: Castleford Tigers
Rangi Chase	St. George Illawarra Dragons	Super League: Castleford Tigers
Mark Gasnier	St. George Illawarra Dragons	Stade Français (French rugby union)
Josh Morris	St. George Illawarra Dragons	Canterbury-Bankstown Bulldogs
Kirk Reynoldson	St. George Illawarra Dragons	Retirement
Ben Rogers	St. George Illawarra Dragons	Newcastle Knights
Jason Ryles	St. George Illawarra Dragons	Super League: Catalans Dragons
Lagi Setu	St. George Illawarra Dragons	Brisbane Broncos
Stuart Webb	St. George Illawarra Dragons	Retirement
Simon Woolford	St. George Illawarra Dragons	Retirement
Brent Grose	Sydney Roosters	Retirement
Amos Roberts	Sydney Roosters	Super League: Wigan Warriors
David Shillington	Sydney Roosters	Canberra Raiders
Anthony Tupou	Sydney Roosters	Cronulla-Sutherland Sharks
Bronson Harrison	Wests Tigers	Canberra Raiders
Mathew Head	Wests Tigers	St. George Illawarra Dragons
Brett Hodgson	Wests Tigers	Super League: Huddersfield Giants
Shannon McDonnell	Wests Tigers	Newcastle Knights
Ryan O'Hara	Wests Tigers	Super League: Celtic Crusaders
Ben Te'o	Wests Tigers	Brisbane Broncos
Aaron Gorrell	Super League: Catalans Dragons	Brisbane Broncos
Shane Elford	Super League: Huddersfield Giants	Penrith Panthers
John Skandalis	Super League: Huddersfield Giants	Wests Tigers
Garret Crossman	Super League: Hull Kingston Rovers	South Sydney Rabbitohs
Gareth Ellis	Super League: Leeds Rhinos	Wests Tigers
Jordan Tansey	Super League: Leeds Rhinos	Sydney Roosters
Trent Barrett	Super League: Wigan Warriors	Cronulla-Sutherland Sharks
Stacey Jones	N/A	New Zealand Warriors

=== Coaches ===
Coach	2008 Club	2009 Club
Wayne Bennett	Brisbane Broncos	St. George Illawarra Dragons
Neil Henry	Canberra Raiders	North Queensland Cowboys
Nathan Brown	St. George Illawarra Dragons	Super League: Huddersfield Giants
Daniel Anderson	Super League: St. Helens	Parramatta Eels

== See also ==
- 2009 NRL season results
- 2009 NRL Under-20s season
- 2009 Dally M Awards
- 2009 in rugby league
