= 2009 Canberra Raiders season =

- NRL rank: 13th
- Play-off result: Did not qualify
- 2009 record: Wins: 9; draws: 0; losses: 15
- Points scored: For: 489; against: 510

Team information
- CEO Chairman: Don Furner; John McIntyre
- Coach: David Furner
- Captain: Alan Tongue
- Stadium: Canberra Stadium
- Avg. attendance: 11,027
- High attendance: 19,350

Top scorers
- Tries: Jarrod Croker (12)
- Goals: Terry Campese (56)
- Points: Terry Campese (129)
← 2008	List of seasons	2010 →

The 2009 Canberra Raiders season was the 28th in the club's history. They competed in the NRL's 2009 Telstra Premiership and finished the regular season 13th (out of 16).

== Pre-season ==
The Canberra Raiders lost founding father Les McIntyre in the pre-season in February leading to the disruption of a pre-season camp and his name being embroidered on the club jerseys for the rest of the season 2009 season.

== Season summary ==
Despite a disappointing start to the season for the Raiders, losing too many close matches, they were able to defeat the Melbourne Storm 26 – 16 at Canberra Stadium (Canberra's first victory over Melbourne in 7 years and 14 games) in round 16, keeping their slim finals hopes alive. The Raiders in round 21 handed the Brisbane Broncos club the heaviest defeat in their history with a 56–0 trashing at Canberra Stadium, the largest winning margin of the season. The Raiders also had a memorable win over the number one team at the time St George-Illawarra Dragons, by 24–12. Despite wins against three of the top four (St George Illawarra Dragons, Gold Coast Titans and the Melbourne Storm) and coming within three points of the other (Canterbury-Bankstown Bulldogs) losses to bottom placed teams Cronulla Sharks and Sydney Roosters at home saw the Raiders finish in 13th.

== Results ==
=== Telstra Premiership ===
Trial Games
Round	Opponent	Result	Can.	Opp.	Date	Venue	Crowd	Position
Trial 1	Cronulla Sharks	Win	32	12	24 Jan	Seiffert Oval		N/A
Trial 2	Brisbane Broncos	Loss	16	30	21 Feb	Dolphin Oval	10,500	N/A
Trial 3	Bulldogs	Loss	16	24	28 Feb	Meakin Park		N/A
NRL Regular Season Games
1 (1989 League; Legends Cup)	Wests Tigers	Loss	26	34	16 Mar	Campbelltown Stadium	17,392	11/16
2	Sydney Roosters	Loss	4	28	22 Mar	Canberra Stadium	13,100	16/16
3	Parramatta Eels	Loss	16	18	28 Mar	Parramatta Stadium	11,110	16/16
4	North Queensland Cowboys	Win	23	18	6 Apr	Canberra Stadium	12,193	15/16
5	Cronulla Sharks	Win	24	14	11 Apr	Toyota Stadium	8,561	11/16
6	Gold Coast Titans	Loss	10	16	17 Apr	Skilled Park	18,510	14/16
7	Bulldogs	Loss	20	30	26 Apr	Canberra Stadium	10,241	13/16
8	Penrith Panthers	Loss	10	18	2 May	Canberra Stadium	8,850	14/16
9	BYE				9–11 May			14/16
10 (Heritage Round)	Melbourne Storm	Loss	6	46	18 May	Olympic Park	10,112	14/16
11	New Zealand Warriors	Win	38	12	24 May	Canberra Stadium	8,383	14/16
12	South Sydney Rabbitohs	Win	34	18	1 Jun	ANZ Stadium	9,805	12/16
13	BYE				5–8 Jun			11/16
14	Cronulla Sharks	Loss	22	24	14 Jun	Canberra Stadium	10,104	12/16
15	Manly-Warringah Sea Eagles	Loss	14	20	21 Jun	Brookvale Oval	8,182	15/16
16	Melbourne Storm	Win	26	16	28 Jun	Canberra Stadium	9,551	12/16
17	Gold Coast Titans	Win	34	28	5 Jul	Canberra Stadium	9,800	10/16
18	Newcastle Knights	Loss	4	23	11 Jul	Energy Australia Stadium	15,355	12/16
19	Penrith Panthers	Loss	14	27	18 Jul	CUA Stadium	8,074	14/16
20	Wests Tigers	Loss	4	25	26 Jul	Canberra Stadium	11,150	14/16
21	Brisbane Broncos	Win	56	0	1 Aug	Canberra Stadium	10,200	13/16
22	Bulldogs	Loss	20	23	8 Aug	ANZ Stadium	13,310	13/16
23	St George Illawarra Dragons	Win	24	12	15 Aug	Canberra Stadium	19,350	13/16
24	New Zealand Warriors	Loss	20	34	23 Aug	Mount Smart Stadium	8,812	13/16
25	Newcastle Knights	Win	30	14	31 Aug	Canberra Stadium	9,400	13/16
26	Brisbane Broncos	Loss	10	22	6 Sep	Suncorp Stadium	35,112	13/16

Colour	Result
Green	Win
Red	Loss
Yellow	Golden point Win
Blue	Bye

=== Toyota Cup (Under 20s) ===
The Under 20s team was unsuccessful in defending its National Youth Competition title, the season started well but injuries and players moving up into first grade saw them enter a six match losing streak late in the regular season and saw them just scrape into the top eight on points differential. The team were able to upset the minor premiers Manly in week one of the finals but fell to the Wests Tigers in week two ending their title defence.

== Club awards ==
Award	Winner
Mal Meninga Medal	Josh Dugan; Josh Miller
Coaches Award	Bronson Harrison
Rookie of the Year	Josh Dugan
Fred Daly Memorial Clubman of the Year Trophy	John Woods
National Youth Competition Player of the Year	Steve Naughton
National Youth Competition Coaches Award	Jarred Kennedy
Gordon McLucas Memorial Award (Junior representative player of the year)	Haydon Hodge
Geoff Caldwell Memorial Award (Vocational Encouragement)	Mark Nicholls

== Squad ==
No.

Position
Player

David Milne – FB Adrian Purtell – WG Jarrod Croker – CE Joel Monaghan – CE Phil Graham – WG Terry Campese – FE Marc Herbert – HB Dane Tilse – PR Glen Buttriss – HK Scott Logan – PR David Shillington – PR Bronson Harrison – SR Alan Tongue (Captain) – LK Trevor Thurling – SR Tom Learoyd-Lahrs – SR Nigel Plum – SR Troy Thompson – PR Joe Picker – SR Michael Brophy – WG Daniel Vidot – CE

No.

Position
Player

Justin Carney – WG Brad Cross – CE Andrew Edwards – SR Shaun Fensom – LK Stuart Flanagan – HK Sam Huihahau – WG Daniel Joyce – PR Brett Kelly – WG Cy Lasscock – SR Josh McCrone – FE Josh Miller – PR Zac Russ – FE Nick Skinner – PR Matt Smith – HB James Stuart – CE Joel Thompson – SR Glen Turner – SR Josh Dugan – FB Travis Waddell – HK Drury Low – WG

== Ladders ==
2009 NRL season
Pos	Team	Pld	W	D	L	B	PF	PA	PD	Pts
1	St. George Illawarra Dragons	24	17	0	7	2	548	329	+219	38
2	Canterbury-Bankstown Bulldogs	24	18	0	6	2	575	428	+147	38^{1}
3	Gold Coast Titans	24	16	0	8	2	514	467	+47	36
4	Melbourne Storm	24	14	1	9	2	505	348	+157	33
5	Manly-Warringah Sea Eagles	24	14	0	10	2	549	459	+90	32
6	Brisbane Broncos	24	14	0	10	2	511	566	−55	32
7	Newcastle Knights	24	13	0	11	2	508	491	+17	30
8	Parramatta Eels	24	12	1	11	2	476	473	+3	29
9	Wests Tigers	24	12	0	12	2	558	483	+75	28
10	South Sydney Rabbitohs	24	11	1	12	2	566	549	+17	27
11	Penrith Panthers	24	11	1	12	2	515	589	−74	27
12	North Queensland Cowboys	24	11	0	13	2	558	474	+84	26
13	Canberra Raiders	24	9	0	15	2	489	520	−31	22
14	New Zealand Warriors	24	7	2	15	2	377	565	−188	20
15	Cronulla-Sutherland Sharks	24	5	0	19	2	359	568	−209	14
16	Sydney Roosters	24	5	0	19	2	382	681	−299	14

^{1} The Bulldogs were deducted 2 competition points after an interchange breach in Round 2.

Pos	Team	Pld	W	D	L	B	PF	PA	PD	Pts	
1	Manly Warringah Sea Eagles (M)	24	19	1	4	2	879	417	+462	39	Advance to finals series
2	St. George Illawarra Dragons	24	19	0	5	2	758	461	+297	38	Advance to finals series
3	Melbourne Storm (P)	24	19	0	5	2	833	597	+236	38	Advance to finals series
4	Wests Tigers	24	15	1	8	2	709	588	+121	31	Advance to finals series
5	Brisbane Broncos	24	15	0	9	2	698	551	+147	30	Advance to finals series
6	South Sydney Rabbitohs	24	13	1	10	2	776	568	+208	27	Advance to finals series
7	New Zealand Warriors	24	13	1	10	2	725	612	+113	27	Advance to finals series
8	Canberra Raiders	24	11	2	11	2	706	685	+21	24	Advance to finals series
9	North Queensland Cowboys	24	12	0	12	2	668	683	−15	24	
10	Newcastle Knights	24	9	1	14	2	596	756	−160	19	
11	Canterbury Bulldogs	24	9	1	14	2	649	867	−218	19	
12	Parramatta Eels	24	8	0	16	2	604	698	−94	16	
13	Penrith Panthers	24	8	0	16	2	573	755	−182	16	
14	Gold Coast Titans	24	8	0	16	2	542	738	−196	16	
15	Sydney Roosters	24	6	0	18	2	443	736	−293	12	
16	Cronulla-Sutherland Sharks (W)	24	4	0	20	2	391	838	−447	8	

Updated to match(es) played on 4 October 2009. Source: 2009 NYC Toyota Cup - RLP, 2009 NRL Under-20s season
(M) Minor premiers; (P) Premiers; (W) Wooden spoon
