= 2009 Wests Tigers season =

← 2008	2010 →

The 2009 Wests Tigers season was the tenth in the joint-venture club's history. They competed in the NRL's 2009 Telstra Premiership and finished the season 9th (out of 16), only just missing out on a place in the finals series.

The major signing for the 2009 season was Great Britain international, Gareth Ellis.

== Season summary ==
In late 2008, hooker Robbie Farah was offered a contract with the Gold Coast Titans commencing from the 2010 season. On 13 January 2009, it was announced that Farah had chosen to re-sign with the Wests Tigers for a further four years, until the end of the 2013 season. At the same time, the club appointed Farah as team captain, succeeding Brett Hodgson who had moved on to the Huddersfield Giants.

Only days before the commencement of the 2009 season, Wests Tigers secured Benji Marshall for a further two years, through to the end of the 2011 season.

In November 2008, CEO Scott Longmuir announced the Wests Tigers will move from ANZ Stadium at Homebush to the Sydney Football Stadium at Moore Park for the 2009 season.

== Results ==
2009 Season Results
Round	Opponent	Result	Date	Venue	Crowd	Referee	Position/16
1	Canberra Raiders	Win	16 March 2009	Campbelltown Sports Stadium (H)	17,392	Jared Maxwell Gerard Sutton	6th
1	Canberra Raiders	34 Wests Tigers (Tries: Tuiaki 2, Farah, Payten, Lawrence, Moltzen; Goals: Marshall 5/6; MoM: Ellis) 26 Raiders (Tries: Carney 2, Purtell, Milne; Goals: Campese 5/5)					6th
2	North Queensland Cowboys	Loss	21 March 2009	Dairy Farmers Stadium (A)		Phil Haines; Jason Robinson	13th
2	North Queensland Cowboys	42 Cowboys (Tries: Kaufusi, Webb, Bowen, Burns, Payne, T Williams, J Williams; Goals: Thurston 7/7) 14 Wests Tigers (Tries: Tuiaki, Morris, Moltzen; Goals: Marshall: 1/3)					13th
3	Sydney Roosters	Win	27 March 2009	Sydney Football Stadium (H)		Tony Archer; Gavin Badger	8th
3	Sydney Roosters	40 Wests Tigers (Tries: Tuiaki 2, Lawrence 2, Collis, Farah, Moltzen; Goals: Marshall 6/8; MoM: Marshall) 24 Roosters (Tries: M Aubusson 2, Kenny-Dowall, Anasta; Goals: Fitzgibbon 4/4)					8th
4	Penrith Panthers	Loss	4 April 2009	CUA Stadium (A)		Ben Cummins; Phil Haines	12th
4	Penrith Panthers	42 Panthers (Tries: Lewis, Sammut, Jennings, Pritchard, Graham, Coote: Goals: Gordon 9/9) 22 Wests Tigers (Tries: Hanbury 2, Galloway, Tuiaki; Goals: Marshall 3/5)					12th
5	Manly-Warringah Sea Eagles	Loss	13 April 2009	Brookvale Oval (A)	17,942	Tony De Las Heras; Shayne Hayne	13th
5	Manly-Warringah Sea Eagles	23 Sea Eagles (Tries: B. Stewart 3, Hall; Goals: Lyon 3/4; Field Goal: Orford 1) 10 Wests Tigers (Tries: Ryan, Morris; Goals: Marshall 1/2)					13th
6	Melbourne Storm	Win	20 April 2009	Leichhardt Oval (H)	12,646	Tony Archer; Shayne Hayne	9th
6	Melbourne Storm	16 Wests Tigers (Tries: Lawrence 2, Moltzen; Goals: Marshall 2/3) 6 Storm (Tries: Hoffman; Goals: Smith 1/1)					9th
7	Newcastle Knights	Win	26 April 2009	Campbelltown Sports Stadium (H)	17,898	Jason Robinson; Gerard Sutton	7th
7	Newcastle Knights	26 Wests Tigers (Tries: Collis 3, Morris, Ryan; Goals: 3/5; MoM: Marshall) 24 Knights (Tries: Hilder, Houston, Wicks, Mullen; Goals: Gidley 4/4)					7th
8	Bulldogs	Loss	3 May 2009	ANZ Stadium (A)	25,622	Shayne Hayne; Tony De Las Heras	9th
8	Bulldogs	22 Bulldogs (Tries: El Masri 2, Ennis, Goodwin; Goals: El Masri 3/4; MoM: Ennis) 20 Wests Tigers (Tries: Ryan 2, Moltzen, Payten; Goals: Gallant 2/5)					9th
9	Bye						8th
10	South Sydney Rabbitohs	Loss	17 May 2009	Sydney Cricket Ground (H)	29,970	Ashley Klein; Jason Robinson	10th
10	South Sydney Rabbitohs	23 Rabbitohs (Tries: Talanoa 2, Fa'alongo, Champion; Goals: Luke 2/2, Sandow 1/2: Field Goal: Merritt) 22 Wests Tigers (Tries:Tuiaki 2, Farah, Moltzen; Tries: Marshall 3/4; MoM: Farah)					10th
11	Brisbane Broncos	Loss	22 May 2009	Campbelltown Sports Ground (H)	9675	Ben Cummins; Jared Maxwell	10th
11	Brisbane Broncos	20 Broncos (Tries: Winterstein, Hunt, Te'o, Lockyer; Goals: Parker 2/4) 18 Wests Tigers (Tries: Tagive, Tuiaki, Marshall, Ayshford; Goals: Marshall 1/4)					10th
12	New Zealand Warriors	Loss	31 May 2009	Mt Smart Stadium (A)	15,365	Gavin Badger; Brett Suttor	
12	New Zealand Warriors	14 Warriors (Tries: Locke 2, McKinnon; Goals: Locke 1/3) 0 Wests Tigers (Tries: Goals: )					
13	Penrith Panthers	Loss	5 June 2009	Leichhardt Oval (H)	14,100	Jason Robinson; Bernard Sutton	14th
13	Penrith Panthers	26 Panthers (Tries: Walsh 2, Aiton, Daniela, Tighe; Goals: Walsh 2/3, Cooper 1/2) 10 Wests Tigers (Tries: Tuiaki, Farah; Goals: Marshall 1/2)					14th
14	Parramatta Eels	Win	15 June 2009	Parramatta Stadium (A)	12,003	Ben Cummins; Brett Suttor	13th
14	Parramatta Eels	23 Wests Tigers (Tries: Halatau, Mataka, Farah, Tuiaki; Goals: Marshall 3/4; Field Goal: Farah 1) 6 Eels (Tries: Burt; Goals: Burt 1/1)					13th
15	Melbourne Storm	Loss	21 June 2009	Olympic Park (A)	10,417	Ashley Klein; Steve Lyons	
15	Melbourne Storm	14 Storm (Tries: Cronk, Cross; Goals: Tomane 3/3) 12 Wests Tigers (Tries: Ayshford, Moltzen; Goals: Marshall 2/2)					
16	St. George Illawarra Dragons	Loss	26 June 2009	Sydney Football Stadium (H)	15,211	Jason Robinson; Tony De Las Heras	15th
16	St. George Illawarra Dragons	21 Dragons (Tries: Morris, Creagh, Hornby, Sailor; Goals: Soward 2/4; Field Goal: Soward 1) 10 Wests Tigers (Tries: Ryan, Marshall; Goals: Marshall 1/2)					15th
17	South Sydney Rabbitohs	Win	4 July 2009	ANZ Stadium (A)	14,856	Steve Lyons; Alan Shortall	14th
17	South Sydney Rabbitohs	54 Wests Tigers (Tries: Tuiaki 3, Ayshford 2, Payne, Moltzen, Ryan, Skandalis, Gallant; Goals: Marshall 7/10) 20 Rabbitohs (Tries: Capewell 3, Merritt; Goals: Sandow 2/4)					14th
18	Bye						11th
19	North Queensland Cowboys	Win	19 July 2009	Leichhardt Oval (H)	18,804	Matt Cecchin; Shayne Hayne	11th
19	North Queensland Cowboys	34 Wests Tigers (Tries: Marshall, Lawrence, Tuiaki, Gallant, Payne, Farah; Tries: Marshall 5/7; MoM: Marshall) 14 Cowboys (Tries: Bowen, Webb; Goals: Thurston 2/2)					11th
20	Canberra Raiders	Win	26 July 2009	Canberra Stadium (A)	11,150	Tony Archer; Phil Haines	11th
20	Canberra Raiders	25 Wests Tigers (Tries: Moltzen 2, Morris, Tuiaki; Goals: Marshall 4/4; Field Goals: Farah) 4 Raiders (Tries: Vidot; Goals: Campese 0/1)					11th
21	Manly-Warringah Sea Eagles	Win	3 August 2009	Sydney Football Stadium (H)	13,531	Matt Cecchin; Shayne Hayne	9th
21	Manly-Warringah Sea Eagles	19 Wests Tigers (Tries: Marshall, Ryan, Tuiaki; Goals: Marshall 3/4; Field Goals: Farah) 18 Sea Eagles (Tries: Watmough 2, T Williams; Goals: Orford 3/3)					9th
22	Sydney Roosters	Win	9 August 2009	Sydney Football Stadium (A)	16,427	Gavin Badger; Tony De Las Heras	7th
22	Sydney Roosters	17 Wests Tigers (Tries: Ryan 2, Tuiaki; Goals: Marshall 2/3; Field Goals: Farah) 10 Roosters (Tries: Sa, Kenny-Dowall; Goals: Fitzgibbon 1/2)					7th
23	Cronulla Sharks	Win	16 August 2009	Toyota Stadium (A)		Steve Lyons; Alan Shortall	5th
23	Cronulla Sharks	56 Wests Tigers (Tries: Tuiaki 3, Ayshford 2, Marshall 2, Ryan 2, Moltzen; Goals: Marshall 8/10) 10 Sharks (Tries: Brown, Wright; Goals: Covell 1/2)					5th
24	Parramatta Eels	Loss	21 August 2009	Sydney Football Stadium (H)	34,272	Tony Archer; Jared Maxwell	10th
24	Parramatta Eels	26 Eels (Tries: Burt, Inu, Robson, Hayne; Goals: Inu 5/5) 18 Wests Tigers (Tries: Ryan 2, Ayshford, Morris; Goals: Marshall 1/4)					10th
25	Gold Coast Titans	Loss	29 August 2009	Skilled Park (A)		Tony Archer; Bernard Sutton	10th
25	Gold Coast Titans	34 Titans (Tries: Prince 2, Campbell, O'Dwyer, Rogers, Tagatese; Goals: Prince 6/7) 24 Wests Tigers (Tries: Farah 2, Hanbury 2, Marshall; Goals: Marshall 2/5)					10th
26	Bulldogs	Win	4 September 2009	Sydney Football Stadium (H)		Steve Lyons; Jared Maxwell	9th
26	Bulldogs	34 Wests Tigers (Tries: Ayshford, Lawrence, Moltzen, Galea, Marshall, Halatau; Goals: Marshall 5/6) 12 Bulldogs (Tries: Patten, Morris; Goals: El Masri 2/2)					9th

== 2009 Pre-season trials ==
Wests Tigers 2009 Pre-season Trials
Opponent	Result	Date	Venue	Crowd	Referee
South Sydney Rabbitohs; Return to Redfern	Win	8 February 2009	Redfern Oval	5,000	
South Sydney Rabbitohs; Return to Redfern	Win	30 Wests Tigers (Tries: Marshall, Moltzen, Ryan, Gallant, Hanbury, Meaney; Goals: Marshall 2/3, Meaney 1/2) 26 South Sydney (Tries: Tyrell, McQueen, Lowe, Corrigan, Sayegh; Goals: Capewell 1/2, Reynolds 2/3)			
Sydney Roosters; Foundation Cup	Loss	21 February 2009	Sydney Football Stadium	8,716	Tony Archer
Sydney Roosters; Foundation Cup	Loss	16 Sydney Roosters (Tries: Aubusson, Minichiello, Pearce; Goals: Fitzgibbon 2/3) 12 Wests Tigers (Tries: Mataka, Gallant; Goals: Marshall 2/2)			
Shellharbour City Dragons	Win	6 March 2009	Ron Costello Oval, Shellharbour	4,500	
Shellharbour City Dragons	Win	70 Wests Tigers (Tries: Tuiaki 4, Moltzen 3, Collis 2, Roqica 2, Galloway, Ryan; Goals: Marshall 9) 4 Shellharbour City Dragons (Tries: Costigan)			

== 2009 Season Ladder ==
2009 NRL season
Pos	Team	Pld	W	D	L	B	PF	PA	PD	Pts
1	St. George Illawarra Dragons	24	17	0	7	2	548	329	+219	38
2	Canterbury-Bankstown Bulldogs	24	18	0	6	2	575	428	+147	38^{1}
3	Gold Coast Titans	24	16	0	8	2	514	467	+47	36
4	Melbourne Storm	24	14	1	9	2	505	348	+157	33
5	Manly-Warringah Sea Eagles	24	14	0	10	2	549	459	+90	32
6	Brisbane Broncos	24	14	0	10	2	511	566	−55	32
7	Newcastle Knights	24	13	0	11	2	508	491	+17	30
8	Parramatta Eels	24	12	1	11	2	476	473	+3	29
9	Wests Tigers	24	12	0	12	2	558	483	+75	28
10	South Sydney Rabbitohs	24	11	1	12	2	566	549	+17	27
11	Penrith Panthers	24	11	1	12	2	515	589	−74	27
12	North Queensland Cowboys	24	11	0	13	2	558	474	+84	26
13	Canberra Raiders	24	9	0	15	2	489	520	−31	22
14	New Zealand Warriors	24	7	2	15	2	377	565	−188	20
15	Cronulla-Sutherland Sharks	24	5	0	19	2	359	568	−209	14
16	Sydney Roosters	24	5	0	19	2	382	681	−299	14

^{1} The Bulldogs were deducted 2 competition points after an interchange breach in Round 2.

== 2009 squad ==
Wests Tigers 2009 squad
Blake Ayshford (Lock, Centre); Dean Collis (Centre); Wade Dunley (Halfback); Simon Dwyer (Second-row); Gareth Ellis (Second-row); Robbie Farah (c) (Hooker); Danny Galea (Lock); Shannon Gallant (Fullback); Keith Galloway (Prop); Bryce Gibbs (Prop); David Gower (Prop)	Dene Halatau (Lock, Centre); Rhys Hanbury (Fullback, Centre); Chris Heighington (Second-row); Daine Laurie (Prop, Second-row); Chris Lawrence (Centre); Blake Lazarus (Fullback, Halfback); Robert Lui (Halfback); Benji Marshall (Halfback, Five-eighth); Willie Mataka (Second-row); Shannon McDonnell (Fullback)	Tim Moltzen (Fullback, Five-eighth, Halfback); John Morris (Five-eighth, Hooker); Corey Payne (Second-row); Todd Payten (Prop); Beau Ryan (Wing); Alan Schirnack (Second-row); John Skandalis (Prop); Peni Tagive (Wing); Rocky Trimarchi (Lock, Centre); Taniela Tuiaki (Wing)	Coaches: Tim Sheens Head Coach; Royce Simmons Assistant Coach; Peter Gentle Assistant Coach
Squad updated 30 June 2009; Source: RLP

=== 2009 Gains and losses ===
2009 Player Movements
Gains		Losses	
Player	Previous club	Player	New Club
Gareth Ellis	Leeds Rhinos	Liam Fulton	Huddersfield Giants
John Skandalis	Western Suburbs Magpies	Brett Hodgson	Huddersfield Giants
Tame Tupou	Bradford Bulls	Shannon McDonnell	Newcastle Knights
