= 2009 Cronulla-Sutherland Sharks season =

- NRL rank: 15th
- 2009 record: Wins: 5; draws: 0; losses: 19
- Points scored: For: 359 (64 tries, 51 goals, 1 field goal); against: 568 (100 tries, 83 goals, 2 field goals)

Team information
- CEO: Tony Zappia
- Coach: Ricky Stuart
- Captain: Paul Gallen Trent Barrett Luke Covell
- Stadium: Toyota Stadium
- Avg. attendance: 11,364

Top scorers
- Tries: Blake Ferguson (9)
- Goals: Luke Covell (51)
- Points: Luke Covell (134)
← 2008	2010 →

The 2009 Cronulla-Sutherland Sharks season was the 43rd in the club's history. They competed in the NRL's 2009 Telstra Premiership.

== Ladder ==
2009 NRL season
Pos	Team	Pld	W	D	L	B	PF	PA	PD	Pts
1	St. George Illawarra Dragons	24	17	0	7	2	548	329	+219	38
2	Canterbury-Bankstown Bulldogs	24	18	0	6	2	575	428	+147	38^{1}
3	Gold Coast Titans	24	16	0	8	2	514	467	+47	36
4	Melbourne Storm	24	14	1	9	2	505	348	+157	33
5	Manly-Warringah Sea Eagles	24	14	0	10	2	549	459	+90	32
6	Brisbane Broncos	24	14	0	10	2	511	566	−55	32
7	Newcastle Knights	24	13	0	11	2	508	491	+17	30
8	Parramatta Eels	24	12	1	11	2	476	473	+3	29
9	Wests Tigers	24	12	0	12	2	558	483	+75	28
10	South Sydney Rabbitohs	24	11	1	12	2	566	549	+17	27
11	Penrith Panthers	24	11	1	12	2	515	589	−74	27
12	North Queensland Cowboys	24	11	0	13	2	558	474	+84	26
13	Canberra Raiders	24	9	0	15	2	489	520	−31	22
14	New Zealand Warriors	24	7	2	15	2	377	565	−188	20
15	Cronulla-Sutherland Sharks	24	5	0	19	2	359	568	−209	14
16	Sydney Roosters	24	5	0	19	2	382	681	−299	14

^{1} The Bulldogs were deducted 2 competition points after an interchange breach in Round 2.
