= 2009 Manly Warringah Sea Eagles season =

Australian rugby league club season

The 2009 Manly Warringah Sea Eagles season was the 60th in the club's history. They competed in the National Rugby League's 2009 Telstra Premiership and finished the regular season the 5th (out of 16). The Sea Eagles were then knocked out in the first week of the play-offs by eventual premiers, the Melbourne Storm.

== Season summary ==
As 2008 NRL premiers, the Manly Warringah Sea Eagles started their new season with the 2009 World Club Challenge match in England against Super League's 2008 champions, the Leeds Rhinos. They defeated the Rhinos 28 - 20, putting an end to England club football's 5-year hold on the World Club Challenge trophy before preparing for the start of the 2009 NRL season.

Sea Eagles star player Brett Stewart was accused of a sexual assault with a 17-year-old girl, this coming the same day after Manly's infamous season launch on 6 March, where it was believed Stewart got drunk. The NRL suspended Stewart until Round 5 of the competition, but he was still allowed to train with the club. As a result, the club started their premiership defence poorly, with four consecutive losses seeing them at last place after round four. They won their fifth round match so they were the last team to record their first win of the season, against the Wests Tigers. Upon Stewart's return he scored 3 tries in the Sea Eagles' first win of the season. Stewart was exonerated over his sexual assault charge in September 2010.

Stewart only played four further matches in the 2009 season; he suffered a knee injury in the Sea Eagles' round six victory over the South Sydney Rabbitohs and missed a great deal of football. He returned in round 25, just in time for Manly's charge to the finals; after the Sea eagles initially struggled without him on the field. Manly were eliminated in the first round of finals, going down 40–12 to the Melbourne Storm at Etihad Stadium despite finishing fifth at the end of the regular season. Losses to two of the top three teams were the reasons for Manly's early exit, ending their premiership defence in disappointment.

== 2009 Squad ==
No.

Position
Player

Chris Bailey – FE Matt Ballin – HK Ben Farrar – WG Adam Cuthbertson – SR Kieran Foran – FE Glenn Hall – positions Trent Hodkinson – HB Will Hopoate – FB Jason King – PR Brent Kite – PR Heath L'Estrange – positions Jake Lingard – SR Jamie Lyon – FE Steve Matai – CE

No.

Position
Player

Vic Mauro – SR Phil Morwood – SR Shane Neumann – CE Matt Orford – HB Junior Paulo – CE Josh Perry – PR Michael Robertson – WG Shane Rodney – SR George Rose – PR Brett Stewart – FB Glenn Stewart – SR Andrew Suniula – WG Jared Waerea-Hargreaves – SR Anthony Watmough – SR David Williams – WG Tony Williams – WG

== Table ==
2009 NRL season
Pos	Team	Pld	W	D	L	B	PF	PA	PD	Pts
1	St. George Illawarra Dragons	24	17	0	7	2	548	329	+219	38
2	Canterbury-Bankstown Bulldogs	24	18	0	6	2	575	428	+147	38^{1}
3	Gold Coast Titans	24	16	0	8	2	514	467	+47	36
4	Melbourne Storm	24	14	1	9	2	505	348	+157	33
5	Manly-Warringah Sea Eagles	24	14	0	10	2	549	459	+90	32
6	Brisbane Broncos	24	14	0	10	2	511	566	−55	32
7	Newcastle Knights	24	13	0	11	2	508	491	+17	30
8	Parramatta Eels	24	12	1	11	2	476	473	+3	29
9	Wests Tigers	24	12	0	12	2	558	483	+75	28
10	South Sydney Rabbitohs	24	11	1	12	2	566	549	+17	27
11	Penrith Panthers	24	11	1	12	2	515	589	−74	27
12	North Queensland Cowboys	24	11	0	13	2	558	474	+84	26
13	Canberra Raiders	24	9	0	15	2	489	520	−31	22
14	New Zealand Warriors	24	7	2	15	2	377	565	−188	20
15	Cronulla-Sutherland Sharks	24	5	0	19	2	359	568	−209	14
16	Sydney Roosters	24	5	0	19	2	382	681	−299	14

^{1} The Bulldogs were deducted 2 competition points after an interchange breach in Round 2.
