= 2009 Newcastle Knights season =

← 2008	2010 →

The 2009 Newcastle Knights season was the 22nd in the club's history. They competed in the NRL's 2009 Telstra Premiership and finished the regular season 7th (out of 16), reaching the play-offs for the first time since 2006. The Knights were then knocked out of the finals in the first week by the Bulldogs.

== Season summary ==
The Knights won 9 consecutive games at EnergyAustralia Stadium, breaking the previous home record of 8. Season 2009 also saw coach Brian Smith sacked after announcing on July 19 that he had signed a four-year deal with the Sydney Roosters, and subsequently the team faltered as they lost three consecutive games until Newcastle officials dismissed Smith and appointed assistant coach Rick Stone. The season began well for the Knights with the side winning 7 of their opening 10 games and were sitting equal first with the Bulldogs, St. George Illawarra and the Gold Coast with 14 points. However, during the representative season, the Knights struggled and went through a bad period of 7 losses in 11 games, the last three losses were recorded after news broke of Smith's departure from the club. With Stone in charge, the Knights won 3 of their last 4 games to secure 7th place and a finals berth for the first time since 2006.

== Match results ==
Round	Opponent	Result	Score	Venue	Date	Crowd
1	Gold Coast Titans	Lost	20-34	Skilled Park	Sunday, March 15	16,203
2	Cronulla Sharks	Won	24-12	Toyota Stadium	Monday, March 23	11,148
3	South Sydney Rabbitohs	Lost	12-22	Bluetongue Stadium	Sunday, March 29	15,227
4	Manly Sea Eagles	Won	26-12	EnergyAustralia Stadium	Sunday, April 5	15,324
5	New Zealand Warriors	Won	24-22	EnergyAustralia Stadium	Sunday, April 12	13,626
6	St. George Illawarra Dragons	Won	24-18	WIN Jubilee Stadium	Saturday, April 18	14,477
7	Wests Tigers	Lost	24-26	Campbelltown Stadium	Sunday, April 26	17,898
8	Brisbane Broncos	Won	28-12	EnergyAustralia Stadium	Saturday, May 2	18,154
9	Gold Coast Titans	Won	23-18	EnergyAustralia Stadium	Sunday, May 10	11,258
10	Sydney Roosters	Won	38-6	Sydney Football Stadium	Saturday, May 16	8,611
11	North Queensland Cowboys	Lost	10-36	Dairy Farmers Stadium	Monday, May 25	11,892
12	Bulldogs	Won	22-14	EnergyAustralia Stadium	Sunday, May 31	18,322
13	Parramatta Eels	Lost	18-20	EnergyAustralia Stadium	Sunday, June 7	18,085
14	New Zealand Warriors	Lost	0-13	Mt. Smart Stadium	Friday, June 12	14,255
15	BYE					
16	South Sydney Rabbitohs	Won	25-20	EnergyAustralia Stadium	Monday, June 29	14,204
17	Melbourne Storm	Lost	14-18	Olympic Park	Saturday, July 4	9,041
18	Canberra Raiders	Won	23-4	EnergyAustralia Stadium	Saturday, July 11	15,355
19	BYE					
20	Manly Sea Eagles	Lost	20-44	Bluetongue Stadium	Friday, July 24	15,857
21	Sydney Roosters	Lost	18-30	EnergyAustralia Stadium	Saturday, August 1	15,112
22	Parramatta Eels	Lost	8-40	Parramatta Stadium	Sunday, August 9	17,669
23	Melbourne Storm	Won	26-14	EnergyAustralia Stadium	Monday, August 17	13,580
24	North Queensland Cowboys	Won	32-26	EnergyAustralia Stadium	Saturday, August 22	15,408
25	Canberra Raiders	Lost	14-30	Canberra Stadium	Monday, August 31	9,400
26	Penrith Panthers	Won	35-0	EnergyAustralia Stadium	Sunday, September 6	22,152
QF	Bulldogs	Lost	12-26	ANZ Stadium	Saturday, September 12	21,369

== NRL Standings ==
2009 NRL season
Pos	Team	Pld	W	D	L	B	PF	PA	PD	Pts
1	St. George Illawarra Dragons	24	17	0	7	2	548	329	+219	38
2	Canterbury-Bankstown Bulldogs	24	18	0	6	2	575	428	+147	38^{1}
3	Gold Coast Titans	24	16	0	8	2	514	467	+47	36
4	Melbourne Storm	24	14	1	9	2	505	348	+157	33
5	Manly-Warringah Sea Eagles	24	14	0	10	2	549	459	+90	32
6	Brisbane Broncos	24	14	0	10	2	511	566	−55	32
7	Newcastle Knights	24	13	0	11	2	508	491	+17	30
8	Parramatta Eels	24	12	1	11	2	476	473	+3	29
9	Wests Tigers	24	12	0	12	2	558	483	+75	28
10	South Sydney Rabbitohs	24	11	1	12	2	566	549	+17	27
11	Penrith Panthers	24	11	1	12	2	515	589	−74	27
12	North Queensland Cowboys	24	11	0	13	2	558	474	+84	26
13	Canberra Raiders	24	9	0	15	2	489	520	−31	22
14	New Zealand Warriors	24	7	2	15	2	377	565	−188	20
15	Cronulla-Sutherland Sharks	24	5	0	19	2	359	568	−209	14
16	Sydney Roosters	24	5	0	19	2	382	681	−299	14

^{1} The Bulldogs were deducted 2 competition points after an interchange breach in Round 2.

== 2009 Squad ==
Newcastle Knights 2009 Full-time Squad
Player		Position	DOB (Age)	Height	Weight	Junior Club	Previous club(s)
Cameron Ciraldo	(Australia)	Second Row, Lock	30/10/1984 (24)	197 cm	103 kg	Menai	Cronulla Sharks
Ben Cross	(Australia)	Prop	06/12/1978 (30)	190 cm	110 kg	Batemans Bay	Canberra Raiders, Melbourne Storm
Isaac de Gois	(Portugal)	Hooker	24/12/1984 (24)	180 cm	85 kg	All Saints Liverpool	Cronulla Sharks, Wests Tigers
Scott Dureau	(Australia)	Halfback	29/07/1986 (23)	173 cm	82 kg	Port Macquarie Sharks	Nil
Joel Edwards	(Australia)	Prop, Second Row				Cessnock Goannas	Nil
Richard Fa'aoso	(Tonga)	Prop, Second Row	08/05/1984 (25)	182 cm	104 kg	North Aspley	Penrith Panthers, Sydney Roosters, Parramatta Eels
Jimmy Fawcett	(Australia)	Fullback	21/04/1988 (21)	191 cm	86 kg	Umina Bunnies	Canterbury Bulldogs
Kurt Gidley (C) (GK)	(Australia)	Fullback, 5/8	07/07/1982 (27)	178 cm	89 kg	Wests Newcastle	Nil
Matt Hilder	(Australia)	Lock, Hooker	30/04/1982 (27)	184 cm	94 kg	Cronulla Caringbah	Cronulla Sharks, Gold Coast Titans
Chris Houston	(Australia)	Second Row, Lock	15/02/1985 (24)	193 cm	106 kg	Narooma	St George Illawarra Dragons
Marvin Karawana	(New Zealand)	Hooker, Lock	30/07/1986 (23)	181 cm	98 kg	Wainui Lions	Canterbury Bulldogs
Keith Lulia	(Cook Islands)	Centre, Wing	17/06/1987 (22)	190 cm	97 kg	Port Kembla	St George Illawarra Dragons
Adam MacDougall	(Australia)	Centre, Wing	08/05/1975 (34)	183 cm	95 kg	Harbord Diggers	Sydney Roosters, South Sydney
Luke MacDougall	(Australia)	Centre, Wing	05/02/1982 (27)	183 cm	94 kg	Cronulla Caringbah	Cronulla Sharks, South Sydney Rabbitohs, St George Illawarra Dragons
Shannon McDonnell	(Australia)	Fullback, Wing				-	Wests Tigers
James McManus	(Scotland)	Wing, Centre	15/01/1986 (24)	186 cm	91 kg	Palmerston Raiders	Nil
Constantine Mika	(New Zealand)	Second Row, Lock	14/09/1989 (19)	183 cm	98 kg	-	New Zealand Warriors
Jarrod Mullen	(Australia)	5/8, Halfback	09/04/1987 (22)	179 cm	88 kg	Taree Panthers, Wests Newcastle, Old Bar Pirates	Nil
Wes Naiqama	(Fiji)	Centre, Wing, Fullback	19/10/1982 (26)	184 cm	95 kg	Arncliffe Scots	St George Illawarra Dragons
Tim Natusch	(New Zealand)	Prop	03/07/1986 (23)	184 cm	108 kg	Wellington (NZ)	Nil
George Ndaira	(Lebanon)	Hooker	22/02/1985 (23)	175 cm	88 kg	Arncliffe Scots	St George Illawarra Dragons, Sydney Roosters, South Sydney Rabbitohs
Cory Paterson	(Australia)	Second Row, Lock	14/07/1987 (22)	195 cm	107 kg	South Perth Lions	Nil
Ben Rogers	(Australia)	5/8, Lock	26/04/1985 (24)	184 cm	92 kg	St Dominics	St George Illawarra Dragons, South Sydney Rabbitohs, Penrith Panthers
Junior Sa'u	(Samoa)	Centre	18/04/1987 (22)	173 cm	102 kg	Logan Brothers	Canberra Raiders
Steve Simpson	(Australia)	Second Row	27/09/1979 (29)	191 cm	103 kg	Singleton Greyhounds	Nil
Zeb Taia	(Cook Islands)	Lock, Second Row	11/10/1984 (24)	185 cm	106 kg	St Clair Comets	Parramatta Eels
Mark Taufua	(New Zealand)	Second Row, Prop	24/10/1981 (27)	187 cm	104 kg	Woodberry Warriors	Nil
Daniel Tolar	(Australia)	Prop, Second Row	11/04/1982 (27)	188 cm	103 kg	Central Charlestown	Nil
Sione Tovo	(Tonga)	Prop	19/07/1988 (21)	178 cm	110 kg	Mascot Jets	South Sydney Rabbitohs
Akuila Uate	(Fiji)	Wing	6/10/1987 (21)	185 cm	94 kg	Woy Woy	Nil
Cooper Vuna	(Tonga)	Wing, Centre	05/07/1987 (22)	194 cm	103 kg	Otahuhu Leopards	New Zealand Warriors
Danny Wicks	(Australia)	Prop	05/12/1985 (23)	190 cm	124 kg	Grafton Ghosts	St George Illawarra Dragons

== Sources ==
- NRL Draw
- NRL Ladder
- http://www.newcastleknights.com.au
