= 2009 South Sydney Rabbitohs season =

- NRL rank: 10th (out of 16)
- Play-off result: N/A
- 2009 record: Wins: 11; draws: 1; losses: 12
- Points scored: For: 566; against: 549

Team information
- CEO: Shane Richardson
- Coach: Jason Taylor
- Captain: Roy Asotasi
- Stadium: ANZ Stadium

Top scorers
- Tries: Nathan Merritt (19)
- Goals: Chris Sandow (60)
- Points: Chris Sandow (133)
← 2008	2010 →

The 2009 South Sydney Rabbitohs season in Australian rugby league was the 100th in the club's history. They competed in the NRL's 2009 Telstra Premiership, and despite being in 1st position at some points during the year and scoring over 500 points in a season for the first time, they finished 10th out of 16 teams and so failed to reach the play-offs.

In Round 25, South Sydney defeated the minor premiers St. George Illawarra Dragons 41 to 6. This is the only loss greater than 20 points the Dragons have suffered since Wayne Bennett's inception as coach.

John Sutton was awarded the George Piggins Medal for Souths player of the year.

On the ensuing 'Mad Monday', coach Jason Taylor and forward David Fa'alogo were involved in a drunken altercation and both sacked from the club. This prompted the club's co-owner Russell Crowe to write an 800-word letter of apology to a Sydney newspaper.

== Preseason ==
The Rabbitohs played three pre-season games in 2009.

Date	Round	Opponent	Venue	Score	Attendance	Report
8 February	Return to Redfern	Wests Tigers	ATP Performance Centre, Redfern	26–30	5,000	
14 February	Coffs Harbour Trial	Penrith Panthers	BCU International Stad., Coffs Harbour	38–4		
28 February	Charity Shield	St. George Illawarra Dragons	ANZ Stadium, Sydney	18–6	25,871	
Legend: Win Loss Draw

== Regular season ==
Date	Round	Opponent	Venue	Score	Attendance	Report
15 March	1	Sydney Roosters	Sydney Football Stadium, Sydney	52–12	24,486	
20 March	2	Parramatta Eels	ANZ Stadium, Sydney	8–14	20,871	
29 March	3	Newcastle Knights	Bluetongue Stadium, Central Coast	22–12	15,277	
5 April	4	New Zealand Warriors	Mount Smart Stadium, Auckland	22–16	19,386	
13 April	5	Canterbury Bulldogs	ANZ Stadium, Sydney	12–14	22,775	
18 April	6	Manly-Warringah Sea Eagles	ANZ Stadium, Sydney	8–24	14,225	
24 April	7	Cronulla Sharks	ANZ Stadium, Sydney	32–26	11,208	
2 May	8	Gold Coast Titans	Skilled Park, Gold Coast	14–22		
	9	BYE				
17 May	10	Wests Tigers	Sydney Cricket Ground, Sydney	23–22	29,970	
22 May	11	Parramatta Eels	ANZ Stadium, Sydney	16–16	10,670	
1 June	12	Canberra Raiders	ANZ Stadium, Sydney	18–34	9,805	
6 June	13	North Queensland Cowboys	Dairy Farmers Stadium, Townsville	12–46		
13 June	14	Melbourne Storm	nib Stadium, Perth	22–28	15,198	
	15	BYE				
29 June	16	Newcastle Knights	Ausgrid Stadium, Newcastle	20–25	14,204	
4 July	17	Wests Tigers	ANZ Stadium, Sydney	20–54	14,856	
10 July	18	Penrith Panthers	ANZ Stadium, Sydney	36–12	9,017	
17 July	19	Brisbane Broncos	Suncorp Stadium, Brisbane	44–12	50,109	
27 July	20	Sydney Roosters	ANZ Stadium, Sydney	40–20	11,031	
2 August	21	Canterbury Bulldogs	ANZ Stadium, Sydney	18–26	24,217	
8 August	22	Manly Sea Eagles	Brookvale Oval, Manly	36–22	15,702	
14 August	23	Gold Coast Titans	ANZ Stadium, Sydney	14–22	11,977	
22 August	24	Penrith Panthers	Penrith Stadium, Penrith	10–40	14,214	
29 August	25	St. George Illawarra Dragons	ANZ Stadium, Sydney	41–6	19,218	
5 September	26	Cronulla Sharks	Toyota Stadium, Cronulla	26–24	14,879	

== Statistics ==
Player	Tries	Goals	Field goals	Total points
Nathan Merritt	19	0	1	77
Fetuli Talanoa	13	0	0	52
Colin Best	4	0	0	16
Rhys Wesser	1	0	0	4
Eddy Pettybourne	7	0	0	28
Chris Sandow	3	60	1	133
Issac Luke	4	15	0	46
Craig Wing	6	1	0	26
Luke Capewell	6	0	0	24
Beau Champion	11	0	0	44
David Kidwell	1	0	0	4
David Fa'alogo	4	0	0	16
Roy Asotasi	1	0	0	4
Luke Stuart	1	0	0	4
Michael Crocker	2	0	0	8
Jamie Simpson	9	0	0	36
John Sutton	5	0	0	20
David Tyrrell	1	0	0	4
Chris McQueen	2	0	0	8
Junior Vaivai	1	0	0	4
Ben Lowe	1	0	0	4
Scott Geddes	1	0	0	4

== Ladder ==
2009 NRL season
Pos	Team	Pld	W	D	L	B	PF	PA	PD	Pts
1	St. George Illawarra Dragons	24	17	0	7	2	548	329	+219	38
2	Canterbury-Bankstown Bulldogs	24	18	0	6	2	575	428	+147	38^{1}
3	Gold Coast Titans	24	16	0	8	2	514	467	+47	36
4	Melbourne Storm	24	14	1	9	2	505	348	+157	33
5	Manly-Warringah Sea Eagles	24	14	0	10	2	549	459	+90	32
6	Brisbane Broncos	24	14	0	10	2	511	566	−55	32
7	Newcastle Knights	24	13	0	11	2	508	491	+17	30
8	Parramatta Eels	24	12	1	11	2	476	473	+3	29
9	Wests Tigers	24	12	0	12	2	558	483	+75	28
10	South Sydney Rabbitohs	24	11	1	12	2	566	549	+17	27
11	Penrith Panthers	24	11	1	12	2	515	589	−74	27
12	North Queensland Cowboys	24	11	0	13	2	558	474	+84	26
13	Canberra Raiders	24	9	0	15	2	489	520	−31	22
14	New Zealand Warriors	24	7	2	15	2	377	565	−188	20
15	Cronulla-Sutherland Sharks	24	5	0	19	2	359	568	−209	14
16	Sydney Roosters	24	5	0	19	2	382	681	−299	14

^{1} The Bulldogs were deducted 2 competition points after an interchange breach in Round 2.

== Kit and Sponsors ==
=== National Australia Bank ===
The National Australia Bank was the Rabbitohs major home sponsor for the 2009 Telstra Premiership.

=== DeLonghi ===
DeLonghi was the major away sponsor for the Rabbitohs in the 2009 Telstra Premiership.

=== V8 Supercars Australia ===
V8 Supercars was the Rabbitohs major sleeve sponsor for the 2009 Telstra Premiership.

=== Virgin Blue ===
Virgin Blue was the Rabbitohs major training sponsor for the 2009 Telstra Premiership.

== 2009 squad ==
No.

Position
Player

Roy Asotasi – PR (c) Colin Best – CE Luke Capewell – FE Beau Champion – CE Kane Cleal – PR Shaune Corrigan – CE Michael Crocker – SR Garrett Crossman – PR David Fa'alogo – SR Beau Falloon – HK Scott Geddes – PR Michael Greenfield – PR David Kidwell – SR Ben Lowe – LK

No.

Position
Player

Jaiman Lowe – PR Issac Luke – HK Shannan McPherson – SR Chris McQueen – WG Nathan Merritt – WG Eddy Pettybourne – SR Chris Sandow – HB Jamie Simpson – CE Luke Stuart – SR John Sutton – LK Fetuli Talanoa – WG David Tyrrell – SR Taioalo Vaivai – CE Rhys Wesser – FB Craig Wing – HB

== Player statistics ==
Player	Appearances	Tries	Goals	Field Goals	Total Points
–	–	–	–	–	–

== Representative honours ==
Player	All Stars	Anzac Test	Pacific Test	City / Country	State of Origin 1	State of Origin 2	State of Origin 3	Four Nations
