= Eric Grothe Jr. =

Australia international rugby league footballer (born 1980)

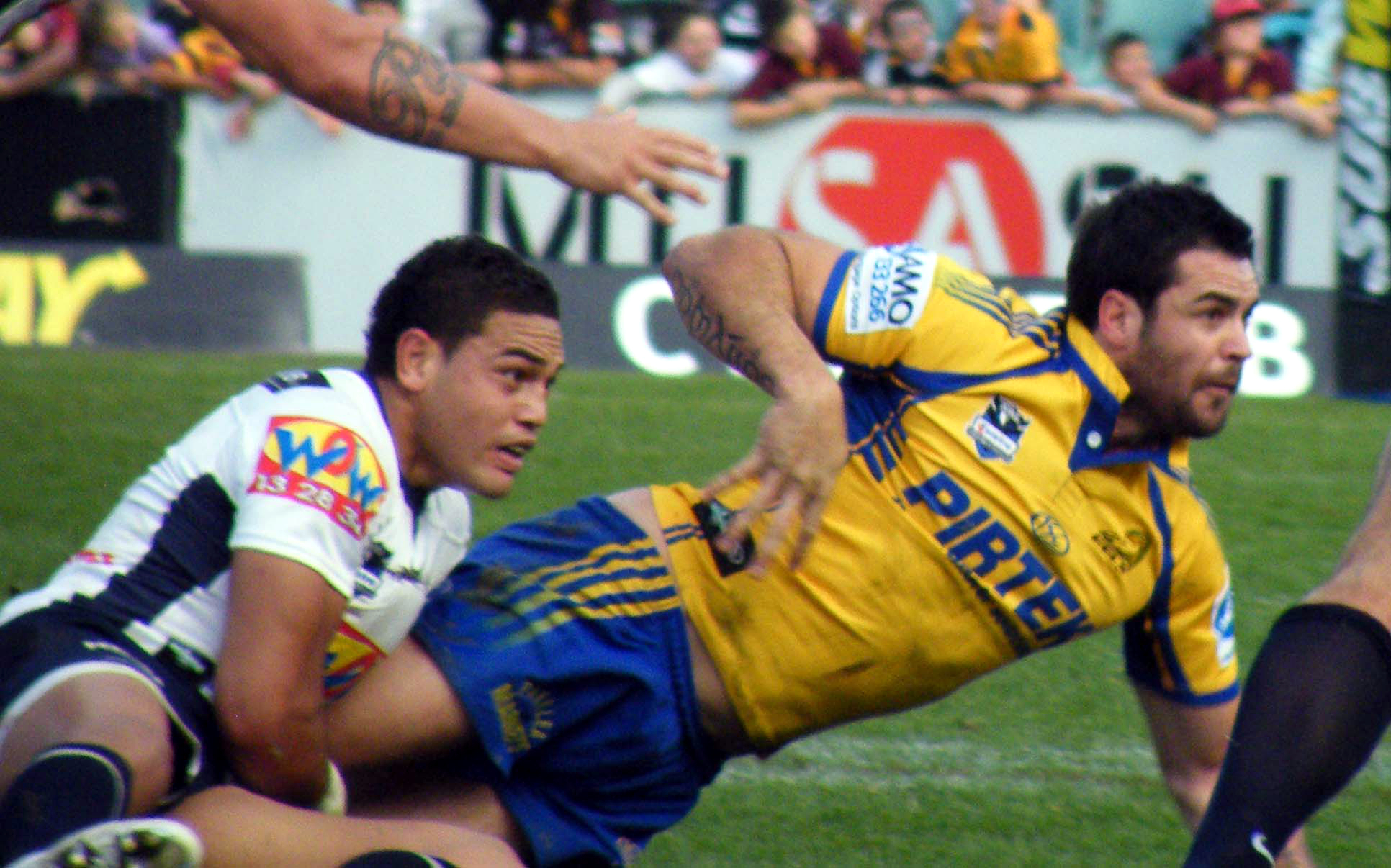
- Grothe playing for Parramatta in 2009

Personal information
- Full name: Eric Raymond Grothe
- Born: 15 March 1980 (age 46) Sydney, New South Wales, Australia

Playing information
- Height: 194 cm (6 ft 4 in)
- Weight: 107.5 kg (16 st 13 lb)
- Position: Wing
Club
Years	Team	Pld	T	G	FG	P
1999–01	Parramatta Eels	15	7	0	0	28
2002–03	Sydney Roosters	11	2	0	0	8
2004–10	Parramatta Eels	116	58	0	0	232
	Total	142	67	0	0	268
Representative
Years	Team	Pld	T	G	FG	P
2005	City Origin	1	0	0	0	0
2006	New South Wales	3	2	0	0	8
2005	Australia	1	1	0	0	4
- Father: Eric Grothe Sr.

Eric Raymond Grothe (born 15 March 1980) is an Australian former professional rugby league footballer who played in the 1990s, 2000s and 2010s. A New South Wales State of Origin and Australia national representative wing, he played in the National Rugby League, largely for Sydney club, Parramatta Eels, with whom his father, Eric Grothe Sr., achieved legendary status in the 1980s. Grothe Jr. also spent three seasons with the Sydney Roosters, and at the end of his career was contracted to the Cronulla-Sutherland Sharks.

== Early life ==
Grothe was born in Sydney, New South Wales, Australia and played for junior clubs Mounties and Eagle Vale.

== Playing career ==
=== Parramatta Eels (1999–2001) ===
In the 1999 NRL season, Grothe made his first grade debut for the Parramatta Eels as a 19-year-old against the North Queensland Cowboys at Parramatta Stadium in round 19 which ended in a 24-12 victory.

Grothe scored his first try in the top grade the following week as Parramatta defeated Western Suburbs 68-10. Grothe played in Parramatta's qualifying final victory over the Newcastle Knights, scoring a try in a 30-16 win. Grothe was selected by New South Wales for the 2000 State of Origin series but was later ruled out with a knee injury.

Grothe made nine appearances in the 2000 NRL season before departing Parramatta. Grothe sat out the entire 2001 NRL season due to the knee injury he suffered the previous year.

=== Sydney Roosters (2002–2003) ===
Grothe returned to rugby league in 2002 with the Sydney Roosters. Grothe only played eleven top grade games for the club over two seasons and did not play in the 2002 premiership winning team or the 2003 side which reached the grand final but lost to the Penrith Panthers.

=== Parramatta Eels (2004–2010) ===
Grothe then rejoined Parramatta for the 2004 NRL season. Grothe starred that year and also in the following year when he became a City representative in 2005. At the end of the 2005 NRL season, Grothe finished as Parramatta's top try scorer as the club won the minor premiership. Parramatta were tipped to reach the 2005 NRL Grand Final but suffered a shock 29-0 loss to North Queensland in the preliminary final at Telstra Stadium with Grothe playing on the wing.

At the 2005 Dally M Awards, Grothe was named winger of the year. At the end of the season Grothe played for the Kangaroos, becoming, along with his father, Eric, Snr., the 8th father-son combination to represent Australia. Grothe was selected to play for New South Wales on the wing in all three games of the 2006 State of Origin series, scoring two tries in Game 3.

In the 2007 NRL season, Grothe made 23 appearances and scored 11 tries as Parramatta finished 5th and qualified for the finals. Grothe played in the club's 26-10 preliminary final loss against Melbourne in which Grothe scored a try. In the 2008 NRL season, Grothe scored six tries in ten games but was demoted to reserve grade midway through the season by coach Michael Hagan. Grothe also learned that he was free to negotiate with other clubs as Hagan had told him he was not in Parramatta's plans for 2009.

With the arrival of new coach Daniel Anderson in 2009, Grothe was at his powerful and explosive best. Anderson has something of a history with Grothe, having coached him as a 14-year-old in the Harold Matthews Cup back in 1995. Parramatta reached the 2009 NRL Grand Final against the Melbourne Storm. Grothe played on the wing, scoring a try in the Eels' 23–16 loss.

On 13 December 2010, Grothe announced his retirement from football after failing to overcome an injury that kept him sidelined for most of the 2010 NRL season.

=== Cronulla-Sutherland Sharks (2014) ===
On 25 October 2013, Eric Grothe announced his plans to return to rugby league after being out of the NRL for three years. On 5 November 2013, Eric Grothe signed a one-year contract with the Cronulla-Sutherland Sharks for the 2014 NRL season. His NRL return was hampered by a devastating lower back injury that Grothe suffered early in the 2014 season.

== Personal life ==
Grothe continued to showcase his musical talents as a regular member of the cover band on Channel Nine's The NRL Footy Show.

He also had an original band called Shinobi with his brother Daniel and mates Darren Stapleton and Wayne Langfield. Eric writes the music & lyrics for their songs. Shinobi is registered on Triple J Unearthed with track "Enemy" at Number 13.

Grothe Jr. now runs a podcast with his father titled UnderGrothe and also runs a successful health and fat loss business along with an Instagram account where he posts comedic videos.

In February 2021, on a podcast with former rugby league player Jason Stevens, Grothe Jr. described himself as believing in God.
