= 2010 Cronulla-Sutherland Sharks season =

- NRL rank: 14th
- 2010 record: Wins: 7; draws: 0; losses: 17
- Points scored: For: 354 (62 tries, 51 goals, 4 field goals); against: 609 (106 tries, 91 goals, 3 field goals)

Team information
- CEO: Richard Fisk
- Coach: Ricky Stuart; Shane Flanagan
- Captain: Trent Barrett Luke Douglas
- Stadium: Toyota Stadium
- Avg. attendance: 10,551

Top scorers
- Tries: Nathan Gardner (8)
- Goals: Luke Covell (17)
- Points: Nathan Gardner (54); Luke Covell (54)
← 2009	2011 →

The 2010 Cronulla-Sutherland Sharks season was the 44th in the club's history. They competed in the NRL's 2010 Telstra Premiership, finishing the regular season 14th (out of 16).

== Ladder ==
2010 NRL season
Pos.	Team	Pld	W	D	L	B	PF	PA	PD	Pts
1	St. George Illawarra Dragons (P)	24	17	0	7	2	518	299	+219	38
2	Penrith Panthers	24	15	0	9	2	645	489	+156	34
3	Wests Tigers	24	15	0	9	2	537	503	+34	34
4	Gold Coast Titans	24	15	0	9	2	520	498	+22	34
5	New Zealand Warriors	24	14	0	10	2	539	486	+53	32
6	Sydney Roosters	24	14	0	10	2	559	510	+49	32
7	Canberra Raiders	24	13	0	11	2	499	493	+6	30
8	Manly Warringah Sea Eagles	24	12	0	12	2	545	510	+35	28
9	South Sydney Rabbitohs	24	11	0	13	2	584	567	+17	26
10	Brisbane Broncos	24	11	0	13	2	508	535	−27	26
11	Newcastle Knights	24	10	0	14	2	499	569	−70	24
12	Parramatta Eels	24	10	0	14	2	413	491	−78	24
13	Canterbury-Bankstown Bulldogs	24	9	0	15	2	494	539	−45	22
14	Cronulla-Sutherland Sharks	24	7	0	17	2	354	609	−255	18
15	North Queensland Cowboys	24	5	0	19	2	425	667	−242	14
16	Melbourne Storm	24	14	0	10	2	489	363	+126	0^{1}

^{1} Melbourne were deducted eight premiership points and barred from receiving premiership points for the rest of the season due to gross long-term salary cap breaches.

== Results ==
=== Trials ===
12 February 2010 Trial	Cronulla-Sutherland Sharks	4 – 18	Manly-Warringah Sea Eagles	Toyota Stadium
19:30

27 February 2010 Trial	Cronulla-Sutherland Sharks	12 – 36	Wests Tigers	Bluetongue Stadium
17:30

=== Regular season ===
13 March 2010 Round 1	Cronulla-Sutherland Sharks	10 – 14	Melbourne Storm	Toyota Stadium
19:30	Tries: Luke Douglas; Goals: Luke Covell 2/2; Scott Porter 1/1	(Report)	Tries: Greg Inglis; Luke MacDougall; Goals: Cameron Smith 3/3	Attendance: 11,820; Referee: Ben Cummins & Brett Suttor

20 March 2010 Round 2	New Zealand Warriors	30 – 16	Cronulla-Sutherland Sharks	Mount Smart Stadium
19:30	Tries: Manu Vatuvei (3); Aaron Heremaia; Simon Mannering; Sam Rapira; Goals: Kevin Locke 2/4; James Maloney 1/1; Aaron Heremaia 0/1	(Report)	Tries: Luke Covell; Blake Ferguson; Goals: Scott Porter 4/4	Attendance: 15,314; Referee: Jason Robinson & Bernard Sutton

29 March 2010 Round 3	Cronulla-Sutherland Sharks	8 – 30	South Sydney Rabbitohs	Toyota Stadium
19:00	Tries: Luke Covell; Blake Ferguson; Goals: Luke Covell 0/2	(Report)	Tries: Beau Champion (2); Colin Best; Sam Burgess; Issac Luke; Goals: Issac Luke 4/5; Chris Sandow 1/1	Attendance: 10,741; Referee: Shayne Hayne & Brett Suttor

3 April 2010 Round 4	Cronulla-Sutherland Sharks	11 – 0	Parramatta Eels	Toyota Stadium
17:30	Tries: Blake Ferguson (2); Goals: Tim Smith 1/3; Field Goals: Tim Smith 1	(Report)		Attendance: 13,213; Referee: Ashley Klein & Tony De Las Heras

11 April 2010 Round 5	Manly-Warringah Sea Eagles	40 – 12	Cronulla-Sutherland Sharks	Brookvale Oval
14:00	Tries: Jamie Lyon (2); Michael Robertson (2); Glenn Stewart; Trent Hodkinson; Matthew Cross; Goals: Jamie Lyon 6/7	(Report)	Tries: Tim Smith; Grant Millington; Goals: Nathan Stapleton 2/2	Attendance: 16,055; Referee: Tony Archer & Alan Shortall

18 April 2010 Round 6	Brisbane Broncos	44 – 16	Cronulla-Sutherland Sharks	Suncorp Stadium
14:00	Tries: Matt Gillett (2); Israel Folau (2); Dunamis Lui; Ben Te'o; Sam Thaiday; Josh Hoffman; Goals: Corey Parker 6/8	(Report)	Tries: Tim Smith; Isaac Gordon; Siosaia Vave; Goals: Nathan Stapleton 2/3	Attendance: 25,688; Referee: Jason Robinson & Tony De Las Heras

24 April 2010 Round 7	Cronulla-Sutherland Sharks	26 – 6	Newcastle Knights	Toyota Stadium
19:30	Tries: Isaac Gordon (2); Dean Collis; Tim Smith; Kade Snowden; Goals: Nathan Stapleton 3/5	(Report)	Tries: Junior Sau; Goals: Kurt Gidley 1/1	Attendance: 10,662; Referee: Ashley Klein & Phillip Haines

1 May 2010 Round 8	St. George Illawarra Dragons	38 – 0	Cronulla-Sutherland Sharks	WIN Stadium
19:30	Tries: Brett Morris (3); Matt Cooper (2); Jason Nightingale; Neville Costigan; Goals: Jamie Soward 5/8	(Report)		Attendance: 15,779; Referee: Jason Robinson & Tony De Las Heras

16 May 2010 Round 10	Cronulla-Sutherland Sharks	14 – 34	Penrith Panthers	Toyota Stadium
15:00	Tries: Nathan Gardner; Dean Collis; Goals:	(Report)	Tries: Michael Jennings (3); Shane Elford (2); Masada Iosefa; Goals: Michael Gordon 5/6	Attendance: 10,352; Referee: Jason Robinson & Brett Suttor

22 May 2010 Round 11	Parramatta Eels	18 – 22	Cronulla-Sutherland Sharks	Parramatta Stadium
19:30	Tries: Tom Humble; Jeff Robson; Daniel Mortimer; Goals: Luke Burt 3/3	(Report)	Tries: Anthony Tupou; Dean Collis; Tim Smith; Paul Aiton; Goals: Nathan Gardner 3/3; Tim Smith 0/1	Attendance: 13,058; Referee: Jarred Maxwell & Brett Suttor

29 May 2010 Round 12	Cronulla-Sutherland Sharks	4 – 20	Brisbane Broncos	Toyota Stadium
17:30	Tries: Taulima Tautai; Goals: Nathan Gardner 0/1	(Report)	Tries: Israel Folau; Darren Lockyer; Antonio Winterstein; Goals: Corey Parker 4/5	Attendance: 7,826; Referee: Gavin Badger and Gerard Sutton

5 June 2010 Round 13	Sydney Roosters	18 – 42	Cronulla-Sutherland Sharks	Sydney Football Stadium
19:30	Tries: Phil Graham; Shaun Kenny-Dowall; Todd Carney; Goals: Todd Carney 3/3	(Report)	Tries: Grant Millington; Paul Gallen; Siosaia Vave; Nathan Gardner; John Morris; Taulima Tautai; Trent Barrett; Goals: Nathan Gardner 7/9	Attendance: 7,934; Referee: Ben Cummins & Tony De Las Heras

20 June 2010 Round 15	Cronulla-Sutherland Sharks	4 – 22	St. George Illawarra Dragons	Toyota Stadium
14:00	Tries: Isaac Gordon; Goals: Nathan Gardner 0/1	(Report)	Tries: Kyle Stanley (2); Brett Morris; Jason Nightingale; Goals: Jamie Soward 3/5	Attendance: 16,773; Referee: Tony Archer & Alan Shortall

26 June 2010 Round 16	North Queensland Cowboys	19 – 20	Cronulla-Sutherland Sharks	Dairy Farmers Stadium
19:30	Tries: Willie Mason; Matthew Scott; Carl Webb; Goals: Johnathan Thurston 3/4; Field Goals: Johnathan Thurston (1)	(Report)	Tries: Ben Pomeroy; Isaac Gordon; Nathan Gardner; Paul Aiton; Goals: Nathan Gardner 1/3; Tim Smith 0/1; Field Goals: John Morris (1); Trent Barrett (1)	Attendance: 13,063; Referee: Gavin Badger & Brett Suttor

3 July 2010 Round 17	Cronulla-Sutherland Sharks	12 – 24	Canterbury-Bankstown Bulldogs	Bluetongue Stadium
19:30	Tries: Blake Ferguson; Dean Collis; Goals: Scott Porter 2/3	(Report)	Tries: Ben Barba (2); Blake Green; Jamal Idris; Goals: Bryson Goodwin 4/4	Attendance: 9,826; Referee: Jason Robinson & Alan Shortall

11 July 2010 Round 18	Newcastle Knights	21 – 10	Cronulla-Sutherland Sharks	EnergyAustralia Stadium
14:00	Tries: Ben Rogers; Matt Hilder; Junior Sau; Goals: Kurt Gidley 4/5; Field Goals: Jarrod Mullen (1)	(Report)	Tries: Ben Pomeroy; Luke Covell; Goals: Luke Covell 1/2	Attendance: 12,909; Referee: Tony Archer and Gerard Sutton

17 July 2010 Round 19	Cronulla-Sutherland Sharks	18 – 48	Manly-Warringah Sea Eagles	Toyota Stadium
19:30	Tries: Nathan Gardner; Paul Gallen; Josh Cordoba; Goals: Luke Covell 3/3	(Report)	Tries: Anthony Watmough (3); Tony Williams (2); Michael Robertson; Kieran Foran; Jamie Lyon; Chris Bailey; Goals: Jamie Lyon 3/3; Shane Rodney 3/6	Attendance: 8,863; Referee: Jarred Maxwell & Alan Shortall

24 July 2010 Round 20	Canberra Raiders	20 – 13	Cronulla-Sutherland Sharks	Canberra Stadium
17:30	Tries: Daniel Vidot (2); Travis Waddell; Goals: Jarrod Croker 4/4	(Report)	Tries: Ben Pomeroy; Kade Snowden; Goals: Scott Porter 2/2; Field Goals: Trent Barrett 1	Attendance: 9,280; Referee: Matt Cecchin & Ashley Klein

31 July 2010 Round 21	Wests Tigers	24 – 22	Cronulla-Sutherland Sharks	Leichhardt Oval
19:30	Tries: Liam Fulton (2); Mitch Brown; Chris Lawrence; Lote Tuqiri; Goals: Chris Lawrence 1/2; Benji Marshall 1/3	(Report)	Tries: Dean Collis (2); Blake Ferguson; Nathan Gardner; Goals: Scott Porter 3/4	Attendance: 14,492; Referee: Jason Robinson & Brett Suttor

7 August 2010 Round 22	Cronulla-Sutherland Sharks	10 – 37	New Zealand Warriors	Toyota Stadium
19:30	Tries: Trent Barrett; Paul Aiton; Goals: Luke Covell 1/2	(Report)	Tries: Bill Tupou (3); Brent Tate; James Maloney; Joel Moon; Goals: James Maloney 6/7	Attendance: 7,510; Referee: Steve Lyons & Chris James

13 August 2010 Round 23	Cronulla-Sutherland Sharks	18 – 12	Sydney Roosters	Toyota Stadium
19:35	Tries: Ben Pomeroy; Dean Collis; Nathan Gardner; Goals: Luke Covell 3/3	(Report)	Tries: Braith Anasta; Shaun Kenny-Dowall; Goals: Todd Carney 2/2	Attendance: 8,911; Referee: Matt Cecchin & Tony De Las Heras

21 August 2010 Round 24	Melbourne Storm	24 – 4	Cronulla-Sutherland Sharks	AAMI Park
19:30	Tries: Cameron Smith; Dane Nielson; Sika Manu; Ryan Hinchcliffe; Goals: Cameron Smith 4/4	(Report)	Tries: Luke Covell; Goals: Luke Covell 0/1	Attendance: 8,902; Referee: Ashley Klein & Luke Phillips

28 August 2010 Round 25	Cronulla-Sutherland Sharks	30 – 16	Gold Coast Titans	Toyota Stadium
17:30	Tries: Luke Covell; Nathan Gardner; Paul Gallen; Tim Smith; Luke Douglas; Goals: Luke Covell 5/5	(Report)	Tries: Bodene Thompson (2); Jordan Atkins; Goals: Scott Prince 2/3	Attendance: 10,116; Referee: Jason Robinson & Chris James

4 September 2010 Round 26	Penrith Panthers	50 – 12	Cronulla-Sutherland Sharks	CUA Stadium
19:30	Tries: Frank Pritchard (3); Michael Jennings (2); Brad Tighe (2); Wade Graham; Nathan Smith; Goals: Michael Gordon 7/9	(Report)	Tries: Blake Ferguson; Nathan Gardner; Goals: Luke Covell 2/2	Attendance: 10,997; Referee: Jason Robinson & Chris James

== Club Awards ==
- Club Person of the Year – Mark Noakes
- Community Award – Reece Williams
- NSW Cup Player of the Year – Trent Grubb
- NSW Cup Player's Player – Matt Parata
- Player of the Year – Paul Gallen
- Player's Player – Paul Gallen
- Rookie of the Year – Nathan Gardner
- Toyota Cup Player of the Year – Dane Snelson
- Toyota Cup Player's Player – Duncan Reilly
