= 2009 Penrith Panthers season =

- NRL rank: 11th
- 2009 record: Wins: 11; draws: 1; losses: 12
- Points scored: For: 515; against: 589

Team information
- Coach: Matthew Elliott
- Captains: Petero Civoniceva; Trent Waterhouse Nathan Smith Frank Pritchard
- Stadium: CUA Stadium

Top scorers
- Tries: Michael Jennings (17)
- Goals: Michael Gordon (57)
- Points: Michael Gordon (126)
2010 →

The 2009 Penrith Panthers season was the 43rd in the club's history. They competed in the National Rugby League's 2009 Telstra Premiership, finishing the regular season 11th (out of 16). The coach of the team was Matthew Elliott while Petero Civoniceva was the club's captain.

== Fixtures ==
The Panthers again use CUA Stadium as their home ground in 2009, their home ground since they entered the competition in 1967.

=== Regular season ===
Date	Round	Opponent	Venue	Result	Score	Tries	Goals	Attendance
March 14	Round 1	Cronulla-Sutherland Sharks	Toyota Stadium	Loss	10-18	Jennings	Gordon (3/3)	10,617
March 21	Round 2	Canterbury-Bankstown Bulldogs	CUA Stadium	Loss	26-28	Waterhouse (2), Aiton, Tighe	Gordon (5/5)	16,846
March 30	Round 3	Manly-Warringah Sea Eagles	Brookvale Oval	Win	12-10	Coote, Iosefa	Gordon (2/2)	8,667
April 4	Round 4	Wests Tigers	CUA Stadium	Win	42-22	Coote, Graham, Jennings, Lewis, Pritchard, Sammut	Gordon (9/9)	15,813
April 11	Round 5	Melbourne Storm	Olympic Park Stadium	Loss	14-16	Lewis, Tighe	Gordon (3/3)	10,110
April 17	Round 6	Brisbane Broncos	CUA Stadium	Loss	18-38	Elford, Gordon, Jennings	Gordon (3/4)	14,332
April 24	Round 7	Gold Coast Titans	CUA Stadium	Win	34-20	Sammut (2), Coote, Elford, Jennings, Walsh	Gordon (5/6)	9,769
May 2	Round 8	Canberra Raiders	Canberra Stadium	Win	18-10	Daniela (2), Jennings	Sammut (3/3)	8,850
	Round 9	Bye						
March 16	Round 10	Cronulla-Sutherland Sharks	CUA Stadium	Win	26-22	Aiton, Daniela, Lewis, Pritchard	Sammut (5/5)	11,750
May 23	Round 11	Sydney Roosters	CUA Stadium	Win	48-6	Jennings (3), Graham (2), Coote, Elford, Lewis, Pritchard	Sammut (3/4), Walsh (3/5)	8,515
May 29	Round 12	St. George-Illawarra Dragons	WIN Stadium	Loss	10-38	Graham, Pritchard	Sammut (1/1), Cooper (0/1)	10,623
June 5	Round 13	Wests Tigers	Leichhardt Oval	Win	26-10	Walsh (2), Aiton, Daniela, Tighe	Walsh (2/4), Cooper (1/1)	14,100
June 13	Round 14	Manly-Warringah Sea Eagles	CUA Stadium	Loss	6-20	Smith	Walsh (1/1)	15,806
June 19	Round 15	Canterbury-Bankstown Bulldogs	ANZ Stadium	Loss	19-12	Cooper, Pritchard	Walsh (2/3)	13,992
	Round 16	Bye						
July 5	Round 17	Parramatta Eels	CUA Stadium	Win	38-34	Jennings (3), Grant, Paulo, Tia-Kilifi	Walsh (5/7)	16,845
July 10	Round 18	South Sydney Rabbitohs	ANZ Stadium	Loss	12-36	Aiton, Daniela	Walsh (2/2)	9,017
July 18	Round 19	Canberra Raiders	CUA Stadium	Win	27-14	Paulo, Puletua, Tia-Kilifi, Tighe	Gordon (5/5); Walsh (FG)	8,074
July 25	Round 20	North Queensland Cowboys	Dairy Farmers Stadium	Win	28-20	Jennings, Gordon, Sammut	Gordon (4/5)	14,274
Aug 1	Round 21	New Zealand	CUA Stadium	Draw	32-32	Jennings (2), Elford, Puletua, Walsh	Gordon (6/6)	12,677
August 7	Round 22	St. George-Illawarra Dragons	CUA Stadium	Loss	6-25	Lewis	Gordon (1/1)	19,987
August 16	Round 23	Brisbane Broncos	Suncorp Stadium	Loss	24-58	Pritchard, Tighe, Walsh, Waterhouse	Gordon (4/4)	25,305
August 22	Round 24	South Sydney Rabbitohs	CUA Stadium, Penrith	Won	40-10	Tia-Kilifi (2), Aiton, Gordon, Graham, Jennings, Tighe	Gordon (6/7)	14,214
August 28	Round 25	Parramatta Eels	Parramatta Stadium	Loss	6-48	Blair	Gordon (1/1)	20,237
September 6	Round 26	Newcastle Knights	EnergyAustralia Stadium	Loss	0-35			22,152

Legend: Win Loss Draw

== Ladder ==
2009 NRL season
Pos	Team	Pld	W	D	L	B	PF	PA	PD	Pts
1	St. George Illawarra Dragons	24	17	0	7	2	548	329	+219	38
2	Canterbury-Bankstown Bulldogs	24	18	0	6	2	575	428	+147	38^{1}
3	Gold Coast Titans	24	16	0	8	2	514	467	+47	36
4	Melbourne Storm	24	14	1	9	2	505	348	+157	33
5	Manly-Warringah Sea Eagles	24	14	0	10	2	549	459	+90	32
6	Brisbane Broncos	24	14	0	10	2	511	566	−55	32
7	Newcastle Knights	24	13	0	11	2	508	491	+17	30
8	Parramatta Eels	24	12	1	11	2	476	473	+3	29
9	Wests Tigers	24	12	0	12	2	558	483	+75	28
10	South Sydney Rabbitohs	24	11	1	12	2	566	549	+17	27
11	Penrith Panthers	24	11	1	12	2	515	589	−74	27
12	North Queensland Cowboys	24	11	0	13	2	558	474	+84	26
13	Canberra Raiders	24	9	0	15	2	489	520	−31	22
14	New Zealand Warriors	24	7	2	15	2	377	565	−188	20
15	Cronulla-Sutherland Sharks	24	5	0	19	2	359	568	−209	14
16	Sydney Roosters	24	5	0	19	2	382	681	−299	14

^{1} The Bulldogs were deducted 2 competition points after an interchange breach in Round 2.

== 2009 Statistics ==
Nat	Name	Pos	App	T	G	FG	Pts
(Papua New Guinea)	Paul Aiton	HK	24	5	0	0	20
(Australia)	Matthew Bell	SR	23	0	0	0	0
(Australia)	Maurice Blair	FE	15	1	0	0	4
(Australia)	Petero Civoniceva	PR	12	0	0	0	0
(Australia)	Gavin Cooper	SR	22	1	1	0	6
(Australia)	Lachlan Coote	FB	12	4	0	0	16
(Australia)	Geoff Daniela	WG	6	5	0	0	20
(Australia)	Shane Elford	WG	15	4	0	0	16
(Australia)	Andrew Emelio	CE	1	0	0	0	0
(Australia)	Michael Gordon	WG	15	3	57	0	126
(Australia)	Wade Graham	FE	22	5	0	0	20
(Australia)	Tim Grant	PR	17	1	0	0	4
(Samoa)	Masada Iosefa	HK	9	1	0	0	4
(Australia)	Michael Jennings	CE	19	17	0	0	68
(Australia)	Luke Lewis	FE	15	5	0	0	20
(Australia)	Ben McFadgean	WG	1	0	0	0	0
(New Zealand)	Sam McKendry	PR	1	0	0	0	0
(New Zealand)	Joseph Paulo	SR	14	2	0	0	8
(New Zealand)	Frank Pritchard	SR	20	6	0	0	24
(New Zealand)	Frank Puletua	PR	23	2	0	0	8
(Australia)	Joel Romelo	HB	4	2	0	0	8
(Australia)	Jarrod Sammut	HB	21	4	12	0	40
(Australia)	Nathan Smith	LK	23	2	0	0	8
(Samoa)	Junior Tia-Kilifi	CE	8	4	0	0	16
(Australia)	Brad Tighe	CE	19	6	0	0	24
(Australia)	Luke Walsh	HB	18	5	15	1	51
(Australia)	Trent Waterhouse	SR	21	3	0	0	12
(Australia)	Adam Woolnough	PR	9	0	0	0	0

== Jersey ==
Home

Away

Pink Panthers

== Transfers ==
Gains

Player	Previous club
Gavin Cooper	Gold Coast Titans
Luke Walsh	Newcastle Knights
Shane Elford	Huddersfield Giants

Losses

Player	Club
Tony Puletua	Saint Helens
Luke Rooney	(French Rugby Union) Rugby Club Toulonnais
Brendan Worth	Toulouse Olympique
Rhys Wesser	South Sydney Rabbitohs
Shane Rodney	Manly-Warringah Sea Eagles
William Isa	Melbourne Storm
Chris Ward	Canterbury-Bankstown Bulldogs
Josh McCrone	Canberra Raiders
Lancen Joudo	Cronulla-Sutherland Sharks
