= Vave =

Vave may refer to:

- Value Analysis/Value Engineering (VA/VE)
- Siosaia Vave, Tongan Australian rugby league player
