= Nathan Gardner =

Australian rugby league footballer

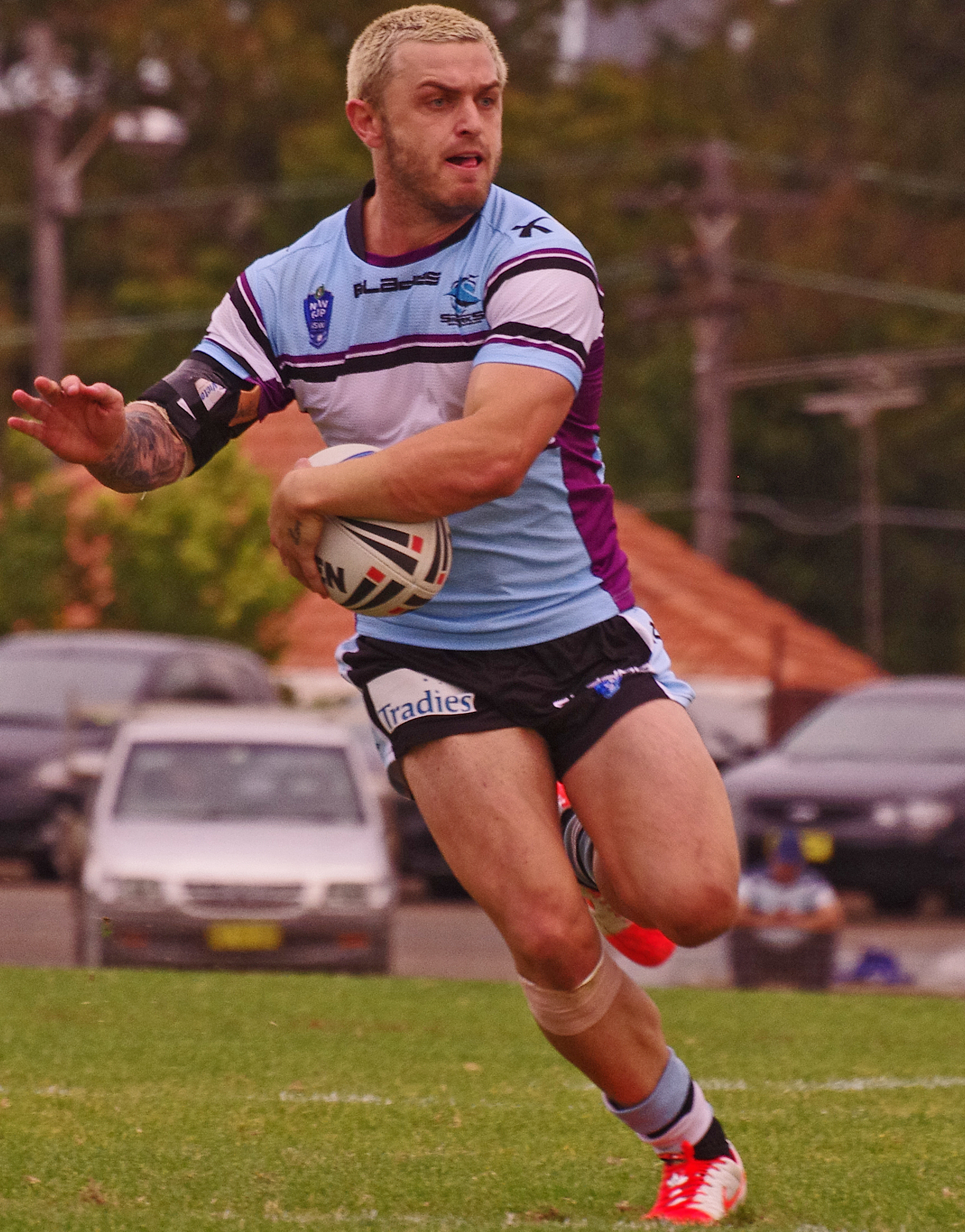

Personal information
- Born: 7 March 1990 (age 36) Sydney, New South Wales, Australia
- Height: 173 cm (5 ft 8 in)
- Weight: 85 kg (13 st 5 lb)

Playing information
- Position: Fullback, Wing
Club
Years	Team	Pld	T	G	FG	P
2010–14	Cronulla Sharks	43	17	11	0	90
Representative
Years	Team	Pld	T	G	FG	P
2015	NSW Residents	1	1	4	0	12
- Source: As of 9 January 2024

Nathan Gardner (born 7 March 1990), also known by the nickname of "Gards", is an Australian professional rugby league footballer who has played in the 2000s and 2010s. He has played for the Cronulla-Sutherland Sharks, usually as a fullback, but also as a wing. He previously played for the Parramatta Eels Toyota Cup (Under-20s) team and Cronulla-Sutherland Sharks. He made his National Rugby League (NRL) premiership début in the 2010 season against the Penrith Panthers.

== Early career ==
As a junior, Gardner played for the Fairfield United Rugby League Club before moving on to play for the Cabramatta Two Blues. Gardner attended Patrician Brothers' College, Fairfield a noted rugby league school. He earned representative honours when he was selected to play for the Australian school boys team at the Under-15s level and earned further representative honours, playing for New South Wales at under 17 level.

Gardner was signed by the Parramatta Eels for the 2008 season and began playing in their Toyota Cup (Under-20s) team. In his first season at the club he played a total of 16 games and scored 136 points including kicking 32 goals from 44 attempts as well as scoring 18 tries. Those 18 tries included four in one game against the St. George-Illawarra Dragons as well as a hat-trick against the Penrith Panthers. A shoulder injury kept him out for the beginning of the 2009 season but he returned to action against the Dragons in round 5 and scored two tries including an 80 metre effort. He played a further 13 games for the season, scoring 100 points including 12 tries and 26 goals from 41 attempts. His season came to a premature end when he suffered a hamstring strain in the round 21 clash against the Sharks. In total he played 29 Toyota Cup games for the club scoring more than a try a game with 30 tries and kicking 58 goals for a tally of 236 points.

== Cronulla-Sutherland Sharks ==
After the 2009 season, Gardner was signed during the off-season by Cronulla-Sutherland Sharks coach Ricky Stuart. Gardner explained the reasoning behind his move, stating that he moved to the Sharks to get the chance to play first-grade football. He came off the bench in the trial matches against Manly-Warringah Sea Eagles and the Wests Tigers, although he began the season in the Toyota Cup competition. He scored a try in each of his first two games for the club against Melbourne and New Zealand and followed that up with four tries to help the Toyota Cup (Under-20s) team to their first victory of the season with a 22 points to 16 victory over South Sydney. He played in the next five matches scoring one more try and kicking two goals from four attempts.

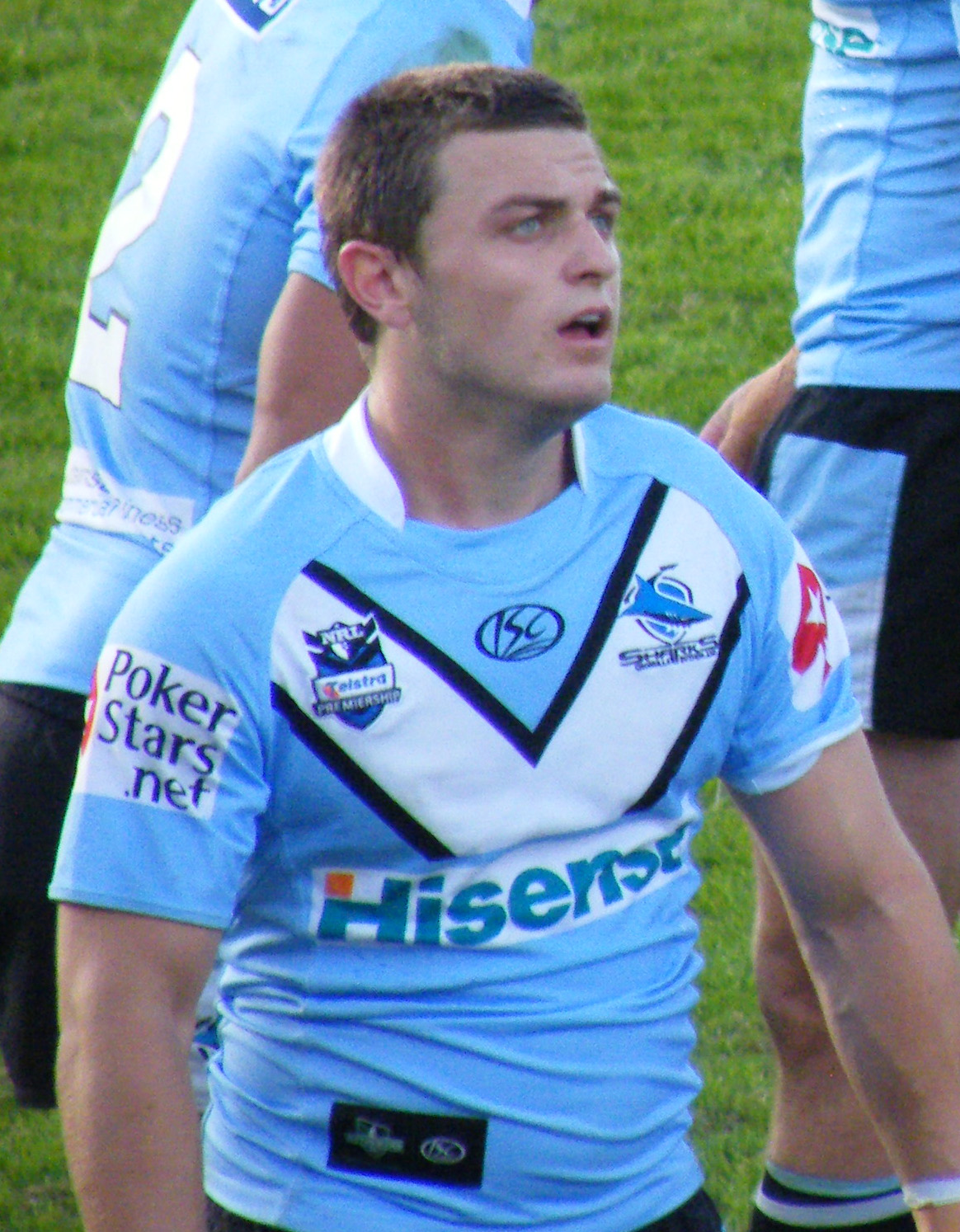
Gardner playing for the Sharks in 2010

=== 2010 (Debut season) ===
After Albert Kelly's poor form and a knee injury to Nathan Stapleton, Gardner became the club's second debutant of the season after he played in his first first-grade match in round 10 against the Penrith Panthers at Toyota Stadium on 16 May. Despite eventually losing the game 34 points to 14, Gardner scored a try to help level the scores at 6-all after being set up by Tim Smith. Gardner credited Kade Snowden with getting him physically prepared for first-grade football and Trent Barrett and Paul Gallen for mentally preparing him. In the following game against his former club, the Parramatta Eels, Gardner kicked all three of his attempted conversions in a 22 points to 18 victory.

In round 13, Gardner inspired the club to a 42 points to 18 upset win against the Sydney Roosters at the Sydney Football Stadium. He kicked a total of 7 goals from 9 attempts and although it was his error that led to a try for Shaun Kenny-Dowall just after the interval, he atoned for the error just under eight minutes later when he scored what many were already tipping as one of the tries of the season. After catching a Braith Anasta bomb just under ten metres out from his own try line, Gardner sidestepped an oncoming player and then sprinted down the left-hand sideline before running across field to score in the corner of the opposite side of the field. Gardner was awarded the man of the match for his performance after notching an 18 point tally. Despite his impressive performance against the Roosters, coach Ricky Stuart suggested that he was planning on giving Gardner a break from first-grade football at some stage during the season.

Gardner kept up his impressive form after scoring a try and kicking 1 goal from 3 attempts in the 20 points to 19 victory over the North Queensland Cowboys in round 16. He also scored a try in round 19 in the 48 points to 18 loss against the Manly Sea Eagles and followed that up two games later with a try in the controversial 24 points to 22 loss against the Wests Tigers. Two rounds later, in the round 23 match against the Sydney Roosters, Gardner scored the match winning try which sealed an 18 points to 12 victory at Toyota Stadium. During the match he was hit high by Frank-Paul Nu'uausala and then taken out in mid air by Braith Anasta. Both players were placed on report following the incidents. After the match, Sharks coach Shane Flanagan tipped Gardner as a long term fullback for the club despite believing just six months earlier that he was too small to make an impact in first grade due to his small stature. Flanagan praised his bravery by stating "he is one of the toughest players for his size I have ever seen." He scored another try two games later, in a 30 points to 16 victory over the Gold Coast Titans, in the club's last home game of the season. In the final game of the season against the Penrith Panthers, Gardner scored another brilliant individual try again after catching a bomb just ten metres out from his own try line and running almost the length of the field to score. However, it was no more than a consolation try in a game that the Sharks would go on to lose 50 points to 12.

Despite playing just 16 first-grade clubs in his debut season, Gardner finished as the club's top try scorer with eight tries. He also kicked 11 goals from 17 attempts making him joint leading point scorer for the club with Luke Covell after finishing with a total of 54 points. He also racked up five assists for the season which put him second at the club behind Trent Barrett.

At the 2010 Dally M Awards, Gardner was nominated for the 'Rookie of the Year' but lost out to Matt Gillett of the Brisbane Broncos. He was also nominated for the 'Peter Frilingos Headline Moment of the Year' for his try against the Roosters in round 13 but lost out to Jarryd Hayne who won the award for his try against the Penrith Panthers. He also polled seven points towards the Dally M Medal. In an official NRL online poll Gardner's try against the Roosters in round 13 was voted, by fans, as try of the year. At the club's end of season awards Gardner was awarded the Steve Rogers Rookie of the Year award.

Gardner has earned a reputation as one of the quickest players in the competition and was invited to race in the first ever Gatorade Bolt event which aimed to find the quickest athlete out of all the football codes in Australia. Gardner finished fourth in the race.

=== 2011 ===
Gardner was playing like his first season by scoring four tries in seven games. However, in round 7, Gardner struck down injured with an ankle sprain while making his well-known kick returns and being tackled and fell awkwardly. He was meant to miss out for two weeks but he returned in the next game against the South Sydney. But, he re-injured himself and missed out five weeks. He returned in round 13 against the Brisbane Broncos. But, Cronulla lost 36-16. In round 15, he scored a try and a try assist against the Bulldogs. They won that game 26-10. In Round 16, he scored two tries against the Gold Coast. They won that game 36 - 12. In round 17, he almost made another try from his well-known kick returns but couldn't go all the way. It didn't matter cause Cronulla side won that game 26 - 4. Since then, he was in good form. During the 2011 NRL finals series, Gardner required surgery on his ankle that he injured in round 7.

=== 2014 ===
In August 2014, Gardner was one of the Sharks players who accepted reduced bans from ASADA under the Sport Minister Peter Dutton for his part in the club's 2011 supplements scandal.

=== 2015 ===
In 2015, Gardner spent the season playing for Newtown in the Intrust Super Premiership NSW.

== Wentworthville Magpies ==
=== 2016 ===
On 19 November 2015 it was announced that Gardner had signed with NSW Cup team Wentworthville Magpies for the 2016 season.
