= George Jennings (rugby league) =

Tonga international rugby league footballer

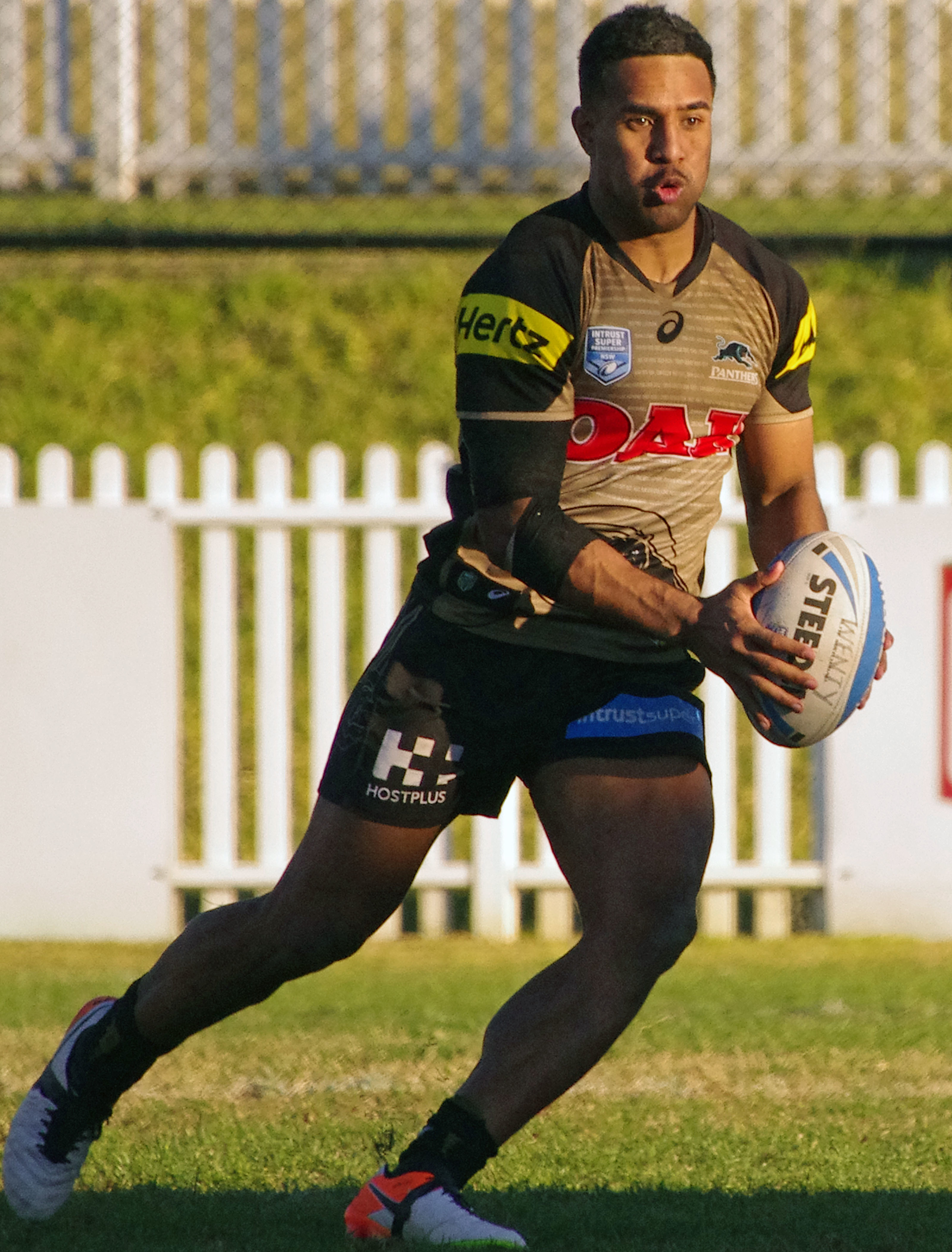

Personal information
- Born: 9 June 1993 (age 33) Blacktown, New South Wales, Australia
- Height: 185 cm (6 ft 1 in)
- Weight: 94 kg (14 st 11 lb)

Playing information
- Position: Wing
Club
Years	Team	Pld	T	G	FG	P
2015–16	Penrith Panthers	5	2	0	0	8
2018–20	Parramatta Eels	24	11	0	0	44
2020(loan)	→ New Zealand Warriors	6	2	0	0	8
2021–23	Melbourne Storm	21	12	0	0	48
	Total	56	27	0	0	108
Representative
Years	Team	Pld	T	G	FG	P
2015	Tonga	1	0	0	0	0
- Source: As of 4 August 2023
- Education: Patrician Brothers' College, Blacktown
- Relatives: Michael Jennings (brother); Robert Jennings (brother); Arthur Jennings (uncle)

George Jennings (born 9 June 1993) is a Tonga international rugby league footballer who plays as a winger and centre for Western Suburbs Devils - Harrigan Premiership.

He previously played for the Penrith Panthers, Parramatta Eels, New Zealand Warriors and the Melbourne Storm in the NRL.

== Background ==
Jennings was born in Blacktown, New South Wales, Australia to Tongan-born parents. He is also of Fijian and English descent. He is the younger brother of former Eels teammate Michael Jennings and older brother of Penrith Panthers player Robert Jennings, and nephew of 1960s All Black Arthur Jennings.

Jennings attended Patrician Brothers' College, Blacktown and represented the 2011 Australian Schoolboys.

He played his junior rugby league for the Western City Tigers prior to being signed by the Penrith Panthers.

== Playing career ==
=== 2011–2014: early career ===
In October 2011, Jennings played for the Australian Schoolboys.

In 2012 and 2013, Jennings played for the Penrith Panthers' NYC team. On 20 April 2013, Jennings played for the New South Wales Under-20s team against the Queensland Under-20s team. On 6 October 2013, Jennings played in Penrith's 42–30 win over the New Zealand Warriors in the 2013 NYC Grand Final.

In 2014, Jennings moved to Penrith's New South Wales Cup team. In February 2014, Jennings played in Penrith's inaugural NRL Auckland Nines squad. He suffered a season ending elbow injury in the tournament. On 30 April 2014, Jennings re-signed with the Penrith outfit on a two-year contract.

=== 2015–2016: Penrith Panthers ===
In Round 1 of the 2015 NRL season, Jennings made his NRL debut for Penrith against the Canterbury-Bankstown Bulldogs. He scored a try on debut. In September 2016, Jennings signed a one-year contract with the Parramatta Eels starting in 2017, after not receiving any game time in the 2016 NRL season.

=== 2017–2020: Parramatta Eels ===
On 2 April 2018, Jennings made his debut for Parramatta in their 30–20 defeat by the Wests Tigers. On 28 August 2018, Jennings won the Jack Gibson NRL Coaches Award after being voted the club's best back. On 30 October 2018, Jennings signed a one-year contract extension to remain at Parramatta until the end of the 2019 season.

Jennings began the 2019 NRL season in reserve grade as coach Brad Arthur chose both Blake Ferguson and Maika Sivo as the club's first choice wingers. In Round 10, Jennings was called into the Parramatta side to cover for the suspended Sivo as the club travelled to Townsville to face North Queensland. With the scores locked at 10–10, Jennings attempted a pass across his own goal line to Ferguson on the first tackle. Ferguson lost the ball and North Queensland crossed over for the match winning try. The following week, Jennings kept his spot on the wing as Parramatta lost to last placed Penrith 16–10. Jennings was then subsequently demoted to reserve grade by Arthur. After being demoted, Jennings made no further appearances for Parramatta in the 2019 NRL season. Jennings instead played for the club's feeder side the Wentworthville Magpies in the Canterbury Cup NSW competition. Jennings scored a try in Wentworthville's 2019 grand final defeat against Newtown at the Western Sydney Stadium.

In round 10 of the 2020 NRL season, Jennings was called into the Parramatta side as a replacement for the injured Blake Ferguson. In his first touch of the ball, Jennings knocked on which lead to a Manly try. In the final play of the game, Jennings scored a try but it was not enough as Parramatta lost the match 22–18 at Brookvale Oval. Midway through the 2020 NRL season, Jennings was loaned out to the New Zealand Warriors side. He made his debut for the club in their round 12 victory over the Wests Tigers at the Sydney Cricket Ground. At the end of the 2020 regular season, Parramatta finished in third place and qualified for the finals. Jennings was a late inclusion for Parramatta in their elimination final match against South Sydney. Jennings scored two tries as Parramatta lost 38–24 at Bankwest Stadium.

=== 2021–2023: Melbourne Storm ===
Jennings signed with Melbourne for the 2021 NRL season making his debut for the club in round 1 against South Sydney. On 20 July, it was announced that Jennings would miss 4-6 matches after suffering a knee injury in the club's victory over Newcastle. On 24 August, Jennings was ruled out for an indefinite period after suffering a knee injury in the club's round 23 victory over the Gold Coast.

Jennings played a total of 18 games for Melbourne in the 2021 NRL season as the club won 19 matches in a row and claimed the Minor Premiership. Jennings played in two finals matches including the preliminary final where Melbourne suffered a shock 10-6 loss against eventual premiers Penrith. In the first half of the match, Jennings made a crucial error when he dropped the ball over the try line when he was unmarked. In round 1 of the 2022 NRL season, Jennings was taken from the field during the clubs match against the Wests Tigers. It was later announced that Jennings would be ruled out for the remainder of the season after suffering an ACL injury. In round 16 of the 2023 NRL season, Jennings made his return to the Melbourne side in their 28-6 victory over the Wests Tigers. In round 23, Jennings suffered an MCL injury in Melbourne's loss against Penrith. It was later announced that Jennings would miss 6-8 weeks. Jennings did manage to return for feeder club the Brisbane Tigers and played on the wing in their 2023 Queensland Cup grand final victory.

== Statistics ==
Year	Team	Games	Tries	Pts
2015	Penrith Panthers	5	2	8
2018	Parramatta Eels	20	8	32
2019	Parramatta Eels	2		
2020	Parramatta Eels	2	3	12
2020	New Zealand Warriors (loan)	6	2	8
2021	Melbourne Storm	18	11	44
2022	Melbourne Storm	1	1	4
2023	Melbourne Storm	2		
	Totals	56	27	108
