= Western City Tigers =

Australian rugby league football club

Western City Tigers RLFC
Club information
- Full name: Western City Tigers Rugby League Football Club
- Colours: Orange; White; Black; Purple
- Founded: 1984

Current details
- Ground: Heber Park, Hebersham
- CEO: Michael Books
- Competition: Penrith Rugby League

Western City Tigers Rugby League Football Club is an Australian rugby league football club based in Mount Druitt, New South Wales formed in 1984 as a merger between Tregear Foxes, Whalan Warriors and the Lethbridge Park Ravens.

== Notable Juniors ==
Notable First Grade Players that have played at Western City Tigers (Mount Druitt City) include:

- Michael Jennings (2007-2020 Penrith Panthers, Roosters, and Eels)
- Geoff Daniela (2007-2013 Penrith Panthers, and Wests Tigers)
- Kurtley Beale (2007- NSW Waratahs and Melbourne Rebels)
- Siosaia Vave (2010-18 Melbourne Storm, Sharks, Manly Sea Eagles, and Parramatta Eels)
- Tim Simona (2011-2016 Wests Tigers)
- George Jennings (2015- Penrith Panthers, Parramatta Eels, New Zealand Warriors, and Melbourne Storm)
- Robert Jennings (2015- Penrith Panthers, South Sydney Rabbitohs, and Wests Tigers)

== See also ==
- List of rugby league clubs in Australia
- Rugby league in New South Wales
