= Robert Jennings (rugby league) =

Tonga international rugby league footballer

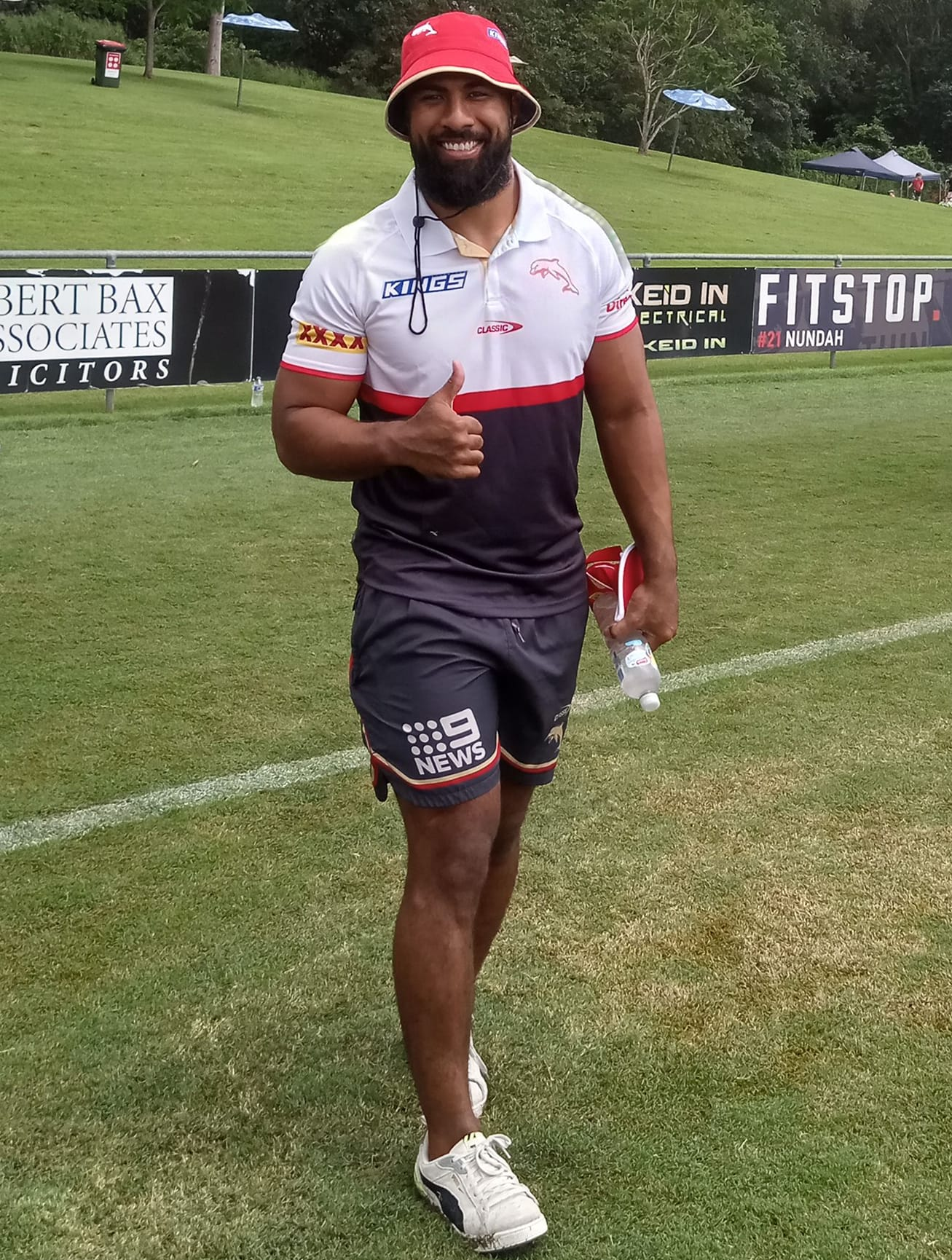

Personal information
- Full name: Robert Jennings
- Born: 2 January 1996 (age 30) Blacktown, New South Wales, Australia
- Height: 187 cm (6 ft 2 in)
- Weight: 107 kg (16 st 12 lb)

Playing information
- Position: Wing, Centre
Club
| Years | Team | Pld | T | G | FG | P |
|---|---|---|---|---|---|---|
| 2015 | Penrith Panthers | 5 | 1 | 0 | 0 | 4 |
| 2017–18 | South Sydney | 34 | 24 | 0 | 0 | 96 |
| 2019–20 | Wests Tigers | 23 | 8 | 0 | 0 | 32 |
| 2021–22 | Penrith Panthers | 8 | 1 | 0 | 0 | 4 |
| 2023 | Dolphins | 4 | 2 | 0 | 0 | 8 |
| | Total | 74 | 36 | 0 | 0 | 144 |
Representative
| Years | Team | Pld | T | G | FG | P |
| 2018 | Tonga | 1 | 1 | 0 | 0 | 4 |
- Source: As of 3 September 2023
- Relatives: George Jennings (brother); Michael Jennings (brother); Arthur Jennings (uncle)

Robert Jennings (born 2 January 1996) is a Tongan international rugby league footballer who last played as a winger and centre for the Dolphins in the National Rugby League (NRL).

He previously played for the Penrith Panthers, the Wests Tigers and the South Sydney Rabbitohs in the NRL.

== Background ==
Jennings was born in Blacktown, New South Wales, Australia to Tongan-born parents. He is also of Fijian and English descent. Jennings is the younger brother of Sydney Roosters player Michael Jennings and Melbourne Storm player George Jennings, and nephew of 1960s All Black Arthur Jennings.

He played his junior football for the Western City Tigers and Minchinbury Jets, before being signed by the Penrith Panthers.

== Playing career ==
=== Early career ===
In 2014, Jennings played for the Penrith Panthers' NYC team. In November and December 2014, he played for the Australian Schoolboys. In 2015, he moved on to the Panthers' New South Wales Cup team.

=== Penrith Panthers (2015–2016) ===
In round 7 of the 2015 NRL season, Jennings made his NRL debut for Penrith against the Gold Coast Titans. On 2 May 2015, he played for the Junior Kangaroos against Junior Kiwis. On 8 July 2015, he played for the New South Wales Under-20s team against the Queensland Under-20s team. At the time, he was contracted with Penrith until the end of 2016.

Jennings was named in Penrith's squad for the 2016 NRL Auckland Nines. After not receiving any game time in the 2016 NRL season, Jennings signed a one-year contract with the South Sydney Rabbitohs starting in 2017. In September, he was named at centre in the 2016 NYC Team of the Year.

=== South Sydney Rabbitohs (2017–2018) ===
Jennings was named in South Sydney's squad for the 2017 NRL Auckland Nines. He made his South Sydney debut against the Manly Warringah Sea Eagles in round 2, scoring a try and setting one up for teammate Robbie Farah.

In round 3 of the 2018 NRL season, Jennings scored his first hat-trick of tries while playing for South Sydney in their 34–6 win over the Manly Warringah Sea Eagles at ANZ Stadium. In round 14 he scored four tries in the club's 42–24 smashing of the Parramatta Eels at ANZ Stadium. Jennings finished off the 2018 season with 19 tries.

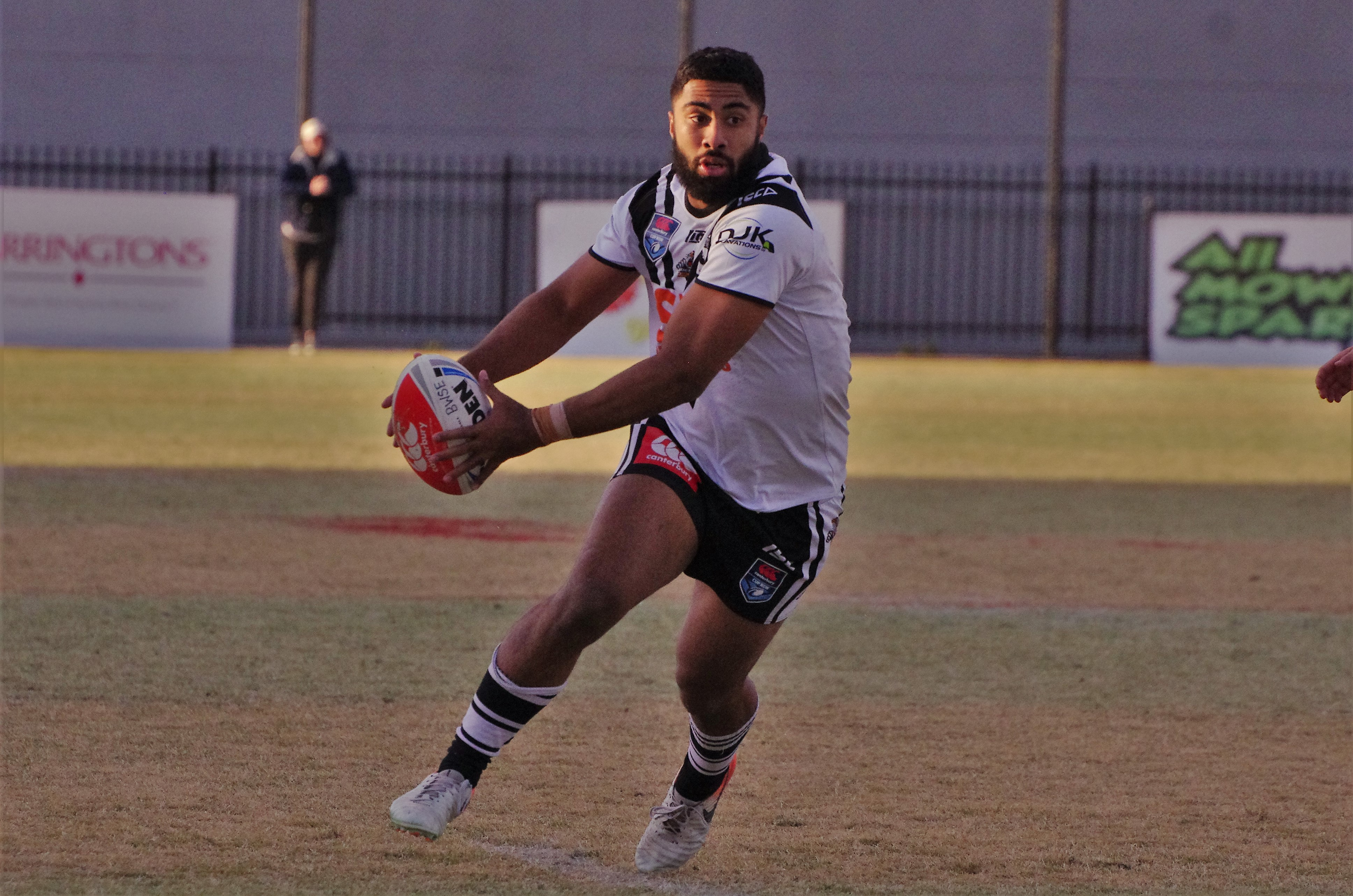
Jennings playing for the Tigers in 2019

=== Wests Tigers (2019–2020) ===
On 21 February 2019, Jennings signed a two-year deal with the Wests Tigers after he was released by South Sydney.

Jennings made a total of 18 appearances for the Wests Tigers in the 2019 NRL season as the club finished ninth on the table and missed out on the finals.

On 28 September 2020, Jennings was one of eight players released by the Wests Tigers.

=== Penrith Panthers (2021–2022) ===
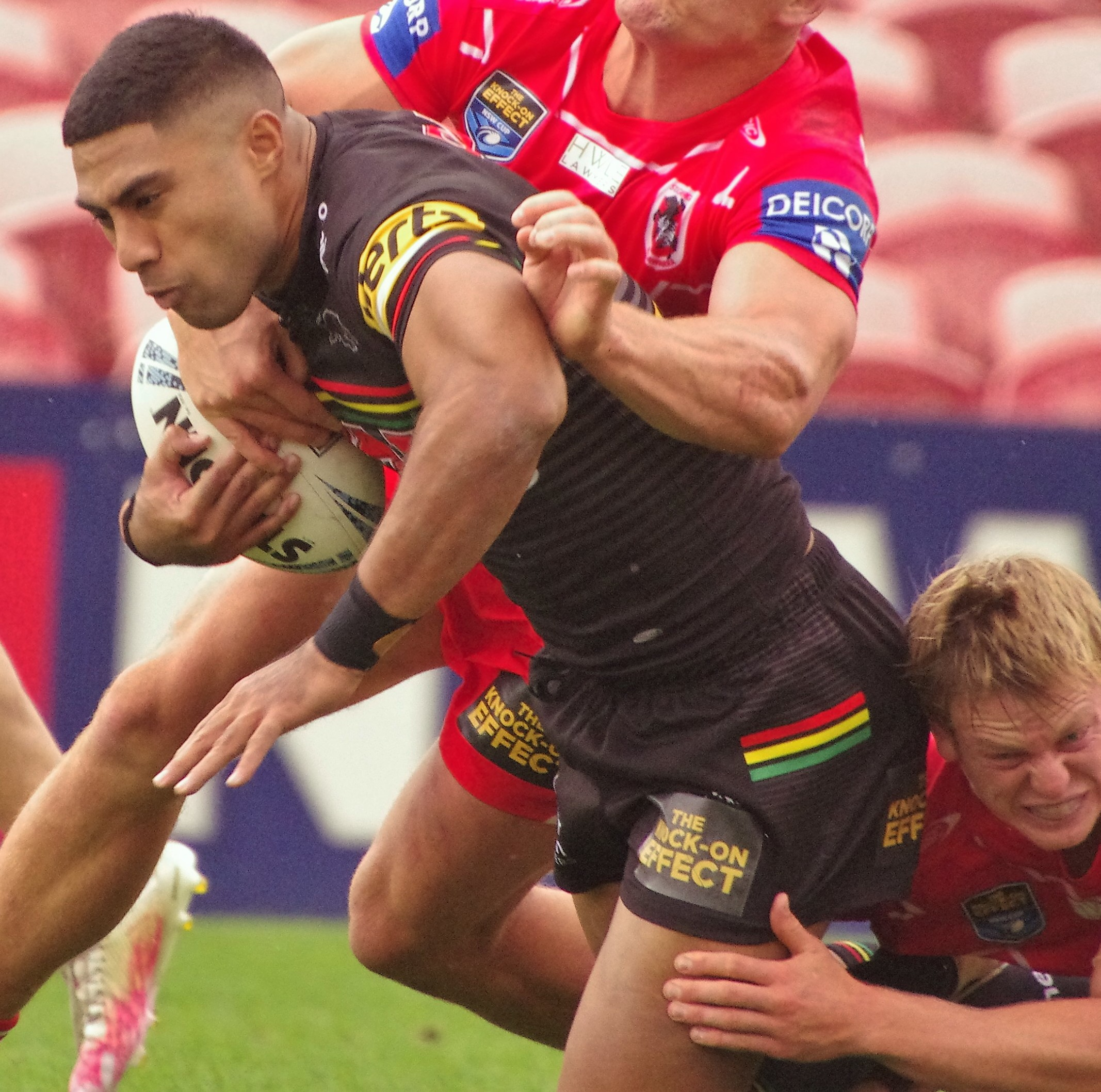
Jennings in 2021

Jennings returned to Penrith on a one-year deal. He made three appearances for Penrith in the 2021 NRL season, mainly filling in during the State of Origin period.

Jennings only played four NRL games in the 2022 NRL season and spent the majority of his time playing for Penrith's NSW Cup team. Jennings played for Penrith in their 2022 NSW Cup Grand Final victory over Canterbury. On 2 October, Jennings played in Penrith's 44–10 victory over Norths Devils in the NRL State Championship final.

=== Dolphins (2022-23) ===
In May 2022, Jennings signed a two-year contract with the Dolphins. In round 7 of the 2023 NRL season, he made his club debut for the Dolphins against the South Sydney Rabbitohs at Suncorp Stadium. In round 8, he scored two tries in the Dolphins 28–26 victory over the Gold Coast Titans at Suncorp Stadium.

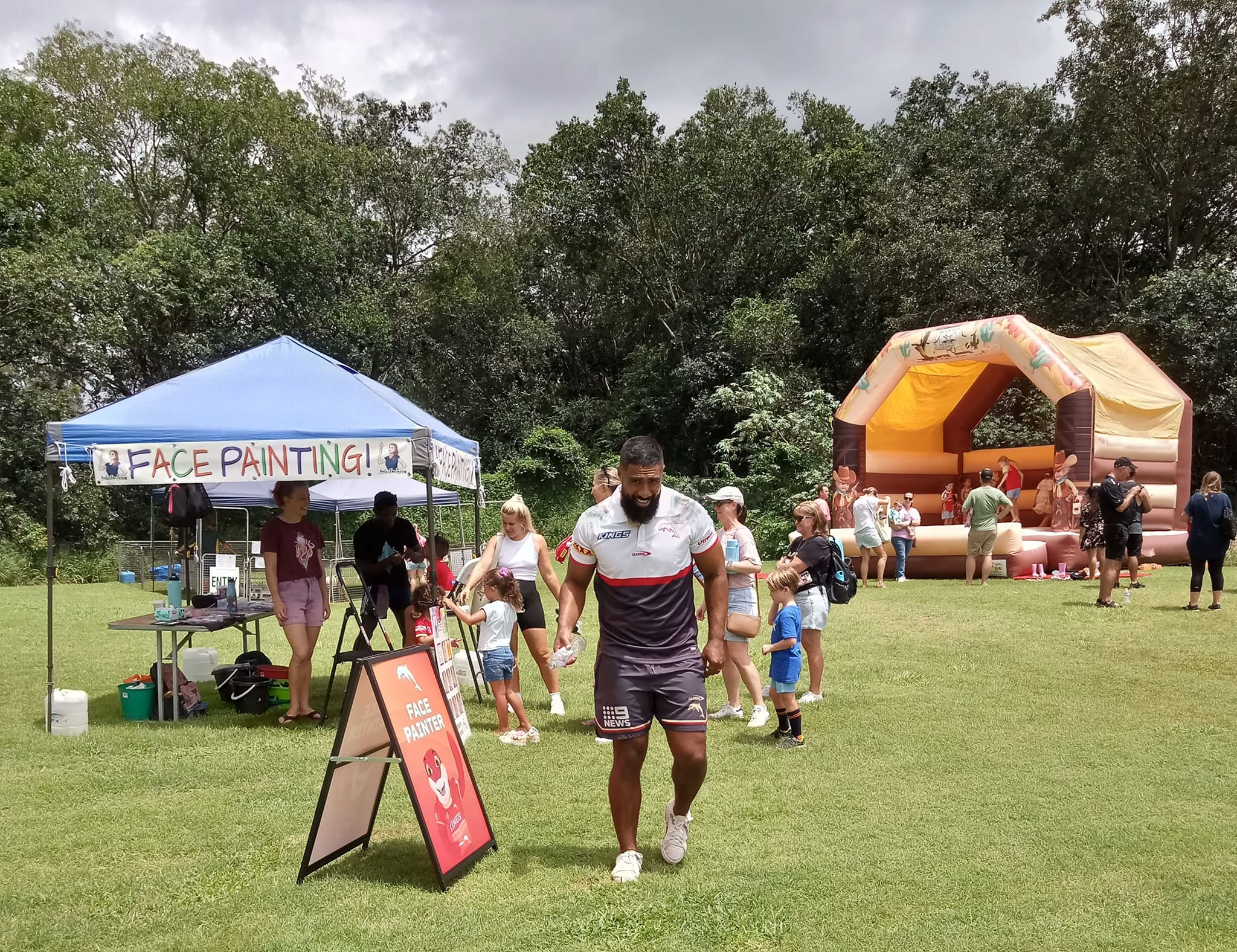
Jennings in Brisbane

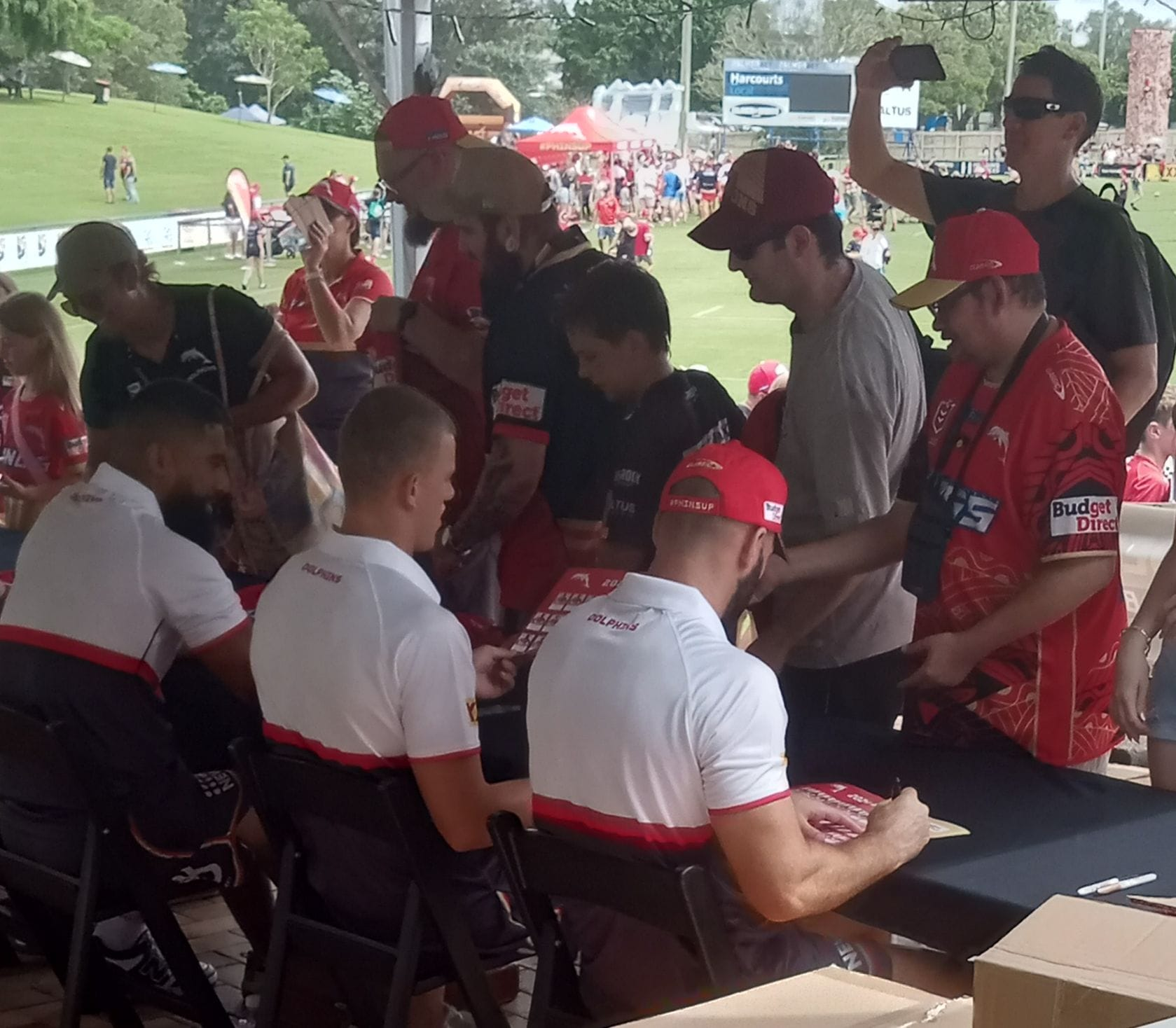
Jennings seated on left

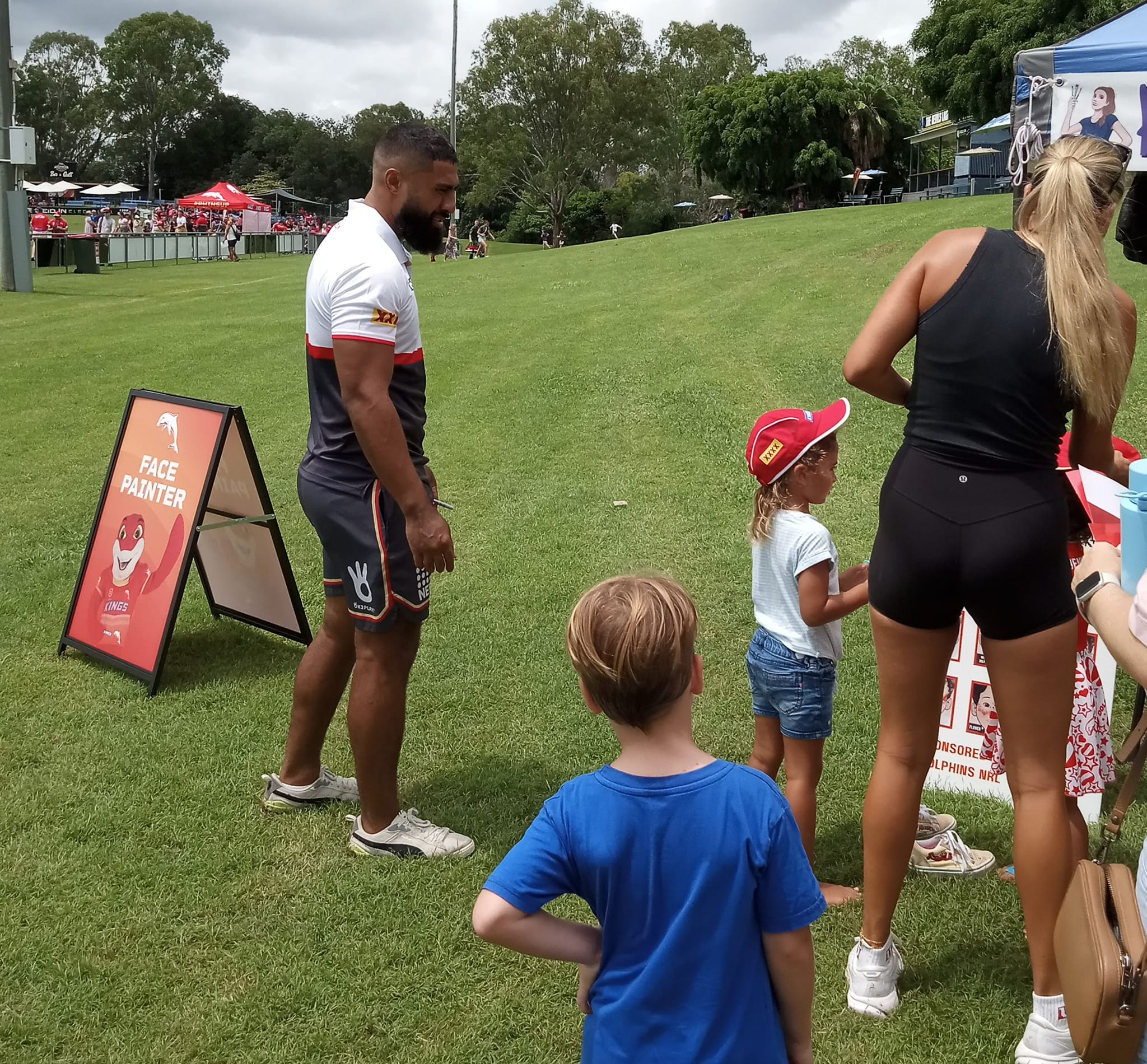
Jennings side-on

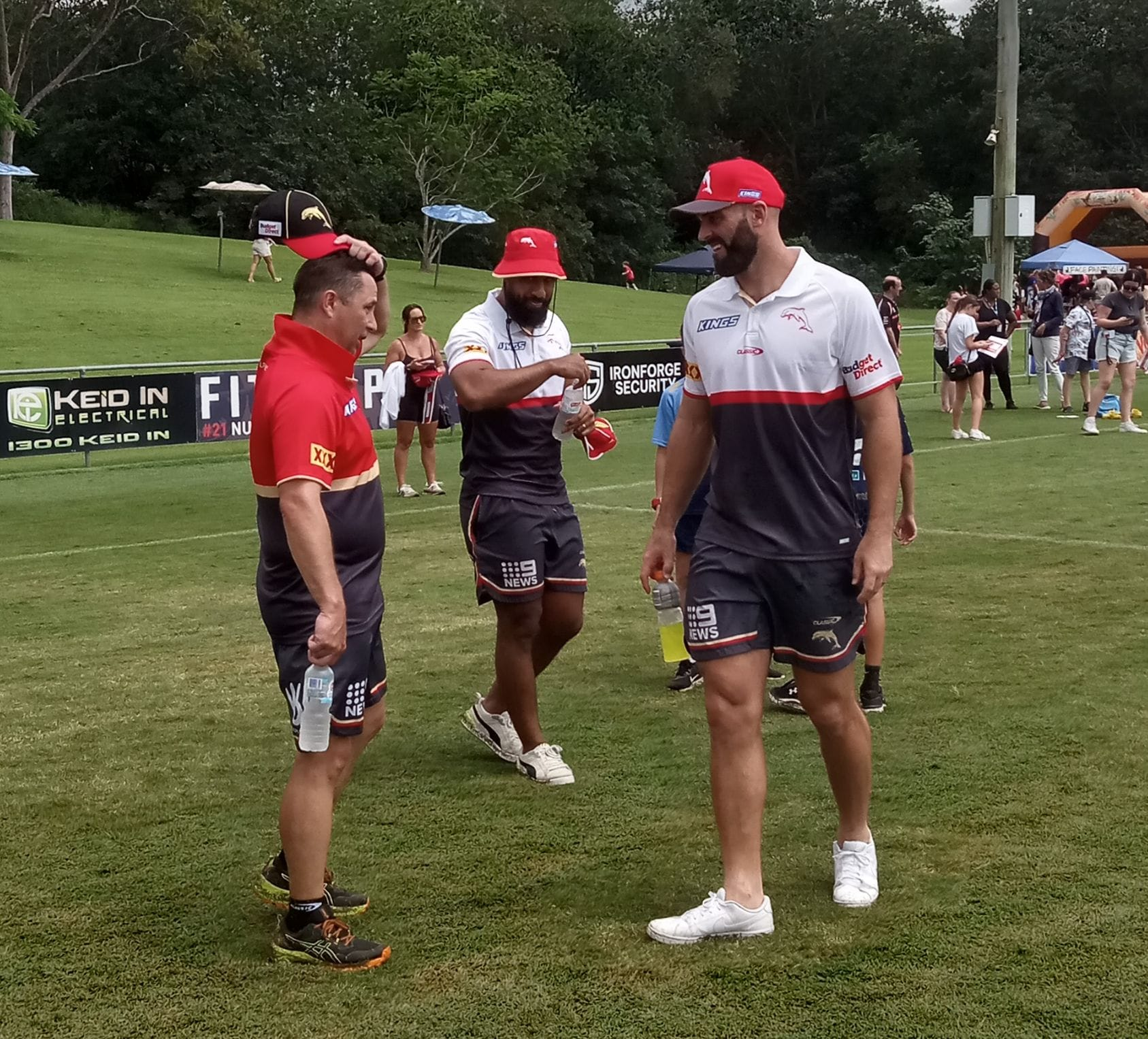
Jennings (centre) and Mark Nicholls

== Post NRL (2024-present) ==
At the end of the 2023 NRL season, Jennings’s contract at the Dolphins had expired marking the end of his professional Rugby League career.

In 2025, Jennings signed with the Stanley River Wolves, a local rugby league club based in Woodford, Queensland. The Wolves compete in the Sunshine Coast Gympie Rugby League competition, where Jennings joined their A-grade side and transitioned to playing in the second row. As of Round 11 of the 2025 season, he has scored six tries, continuing to make a strong contribution at the community level of the sport.
