= Brett Stapleton =

- Born: 7 May 1987 (age 39)
- Height: 1.9 m (6 ft 3 in)
- Weight: 90 kg (200 lb)

Rugby union career
- Position: Wing
Senior career
Years	Team	Apps	(Points)
- Coca-Cola Red Sparks
Super Rugby
Years	Team	Apps	(Points)
2007	Western Force		
2008	Reds		
National sevens team
Years	Team		Comps
2006	Australia 7s		

Brett Stapleton (born 7 May 1987) is an Australian former rugby union player who played for the Western Force in the Super 14 competition in 2007. Frustrated by the lack of opportunity in Perth due to the Force’s plethora of quality backline players, Stapleton took up a contract with the Queensland Reds for 2008 and played for the East Coast Aces in the Australian Rugby Championship’s inaugural year. He is the brother of former National Rugby League player Nathan Stapleton.

Being 1.90 m (6 ft 3 in) and playing at a weight of 90 kg (200 pounds), Stapleton was a winger and known for his fast pace. He had a personal best for the 100m sprint of 10.2s. In the Queensland GPS athletics championships in 2005, he ran 10.69s (with the record being 10.68s) but pulled his hamstring 5m from the finish line and dived headlong to complete the race.
