= Arthur Jennings (rugby union) =

NZ international rugby union player & Fiji politician

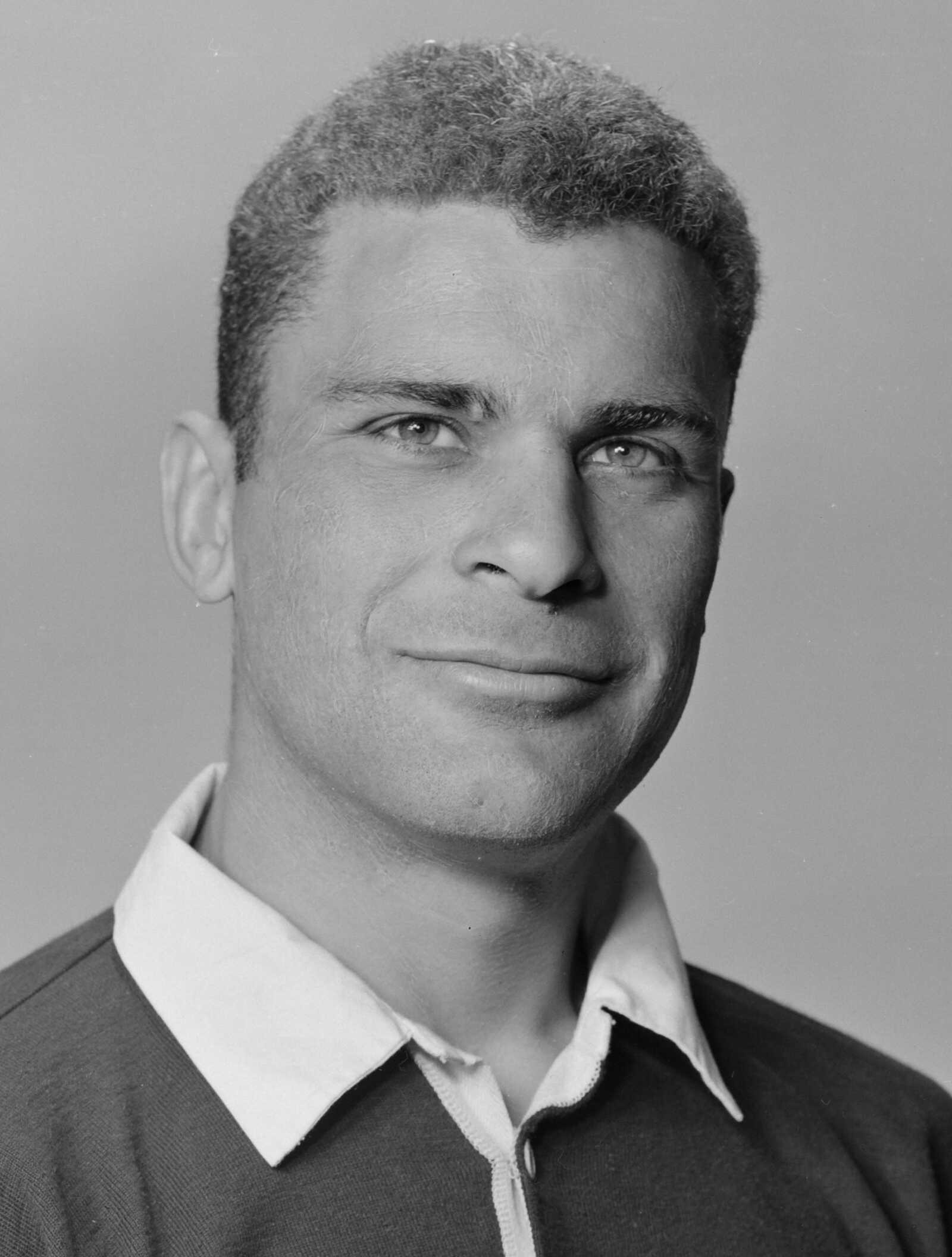
- Jennings in 1966

Member of the House of Representatives of Fiji
- In office 1982–1987
- Preceded by: Bill Clark
- Succeeded by: Tony Wilkinson
- Constituency: Western General National

Personal details
- Born: Arthur Grahn Jennings; 15 June 1940 (age 86) Lautoka, Fiji
- Relatives: Michael Jennings (nephew); George Jennings (nephew); Robert Jennings (nephew)
- Height: 1.93 m (6 ft 4 in)
- Weight: 95 kg (209 lb)
- School: Northcote College

Rugby union career
- Position: Lock
Provincial / State sides
| Years | Team | Apps | (Points) |
| 1962–70 | Bay of Plenty | 89 | |
International career
| Years | Team | Apps | (Points) |
| 1967 | New Zealand | 1 | (0) |

Arthur Grahn Jennings (born 15 June 1940) is a Fijian-born former politician and New Zealand rugby union international. A lock, Jennings represented Bay of Plenty at a provincial level, and was a member of the New Zealand national side, the All Blacks, on their 1967 tour of Britain, France and Canada. He played six games for the All Blacks on that tour but did not appear in any test matches. During the 1980s he served as a member of the House of Representatives in Fiji.

== Biography ==
Of Fijian, Tongan and English ancestry, Jennings was born in Fiji but was educated in New Zealand from an early age. He was the first Fijian to play for the All Blacks, and is the uncle of Tongan and Australian rugby league representative Michael Jennings.

In 1982 Jennings contested the Western general national constituency as a National Federation Party (NFP) candidate, and was elected to the House of Representatives. However, he left the NFP in November 1985, and subsequently lost his seat in 1987, and later unsuccessfully contested the 1999 elections as an independent.
