= Junior Tia-Kilifi =

Samoa international rugby league footballer

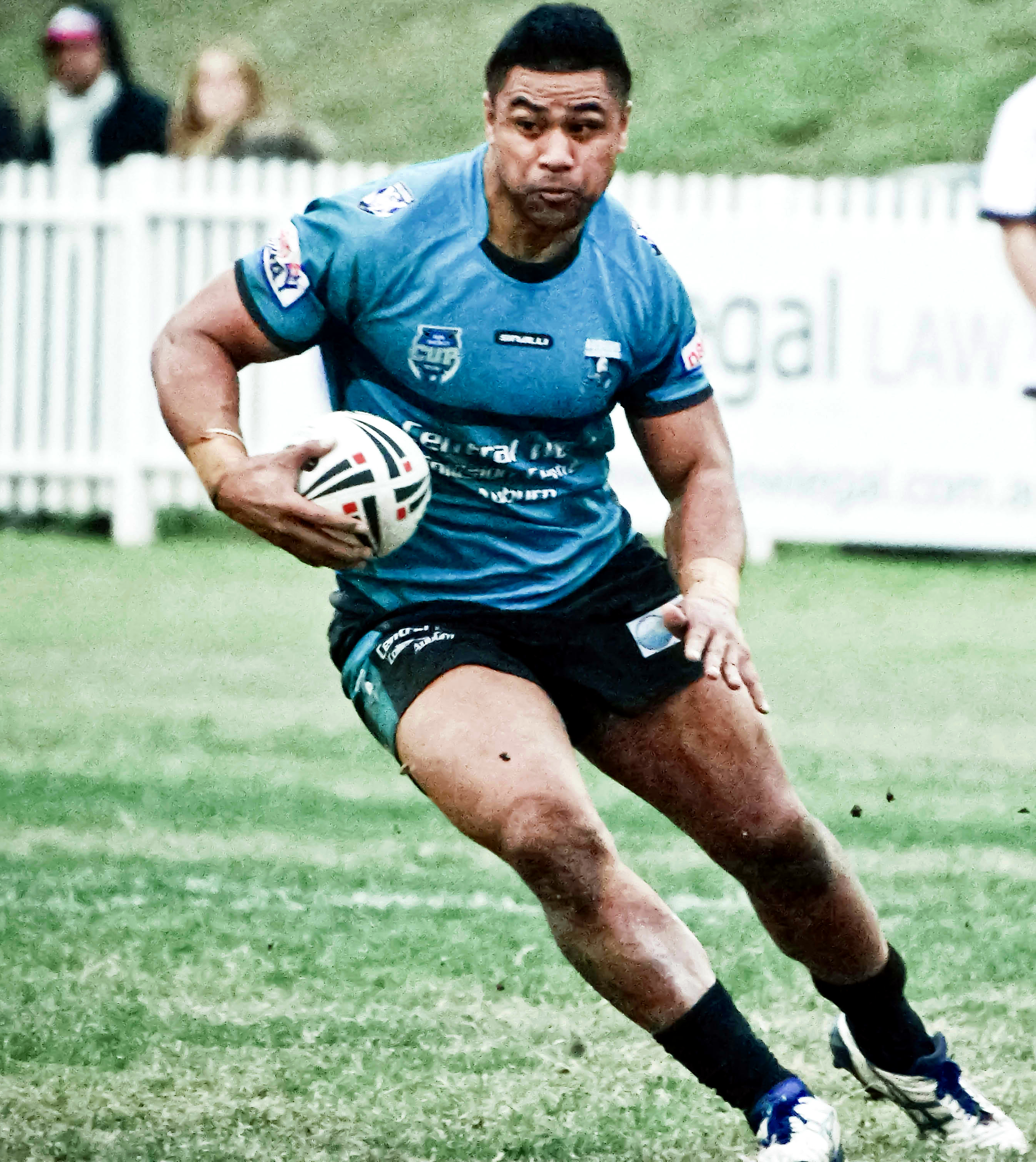

Personal information
- Full name: Junior Tia-Kilifi
- Born: 24 April 1988 (age 38) Auckland, New Zealand
- Height: 1.82 m (5 ft 11 1/2 in)
- Weight: 92 kg (14 st 7 lb)

Playing information
- Position: Wing, Centre, Second-row
Club
Years	Team	Pld	T	G	FG	P
2009	Penrith Panthers	8	4	0	0	16
2010	Canterbury-Bankstown	2	2	0	0	8
	Total	10	6	0	0	24
Representative
Years	Team	Pld	T	G	FG	P
2006	Samoa	1	0	0	0	0
- Source: As of 17 January 2019

Junior Tia-Kilifi (JTK) (born 24 April 1988) is a Samoa international former professional rugby league footballer who played in the 2000s and 2010s for the Penrith Panthers and the Canterbury-Bankstown Bulldogs in the National Rugby League. Tia-Kilifi usually played on the wing or as a centre.

== Background ==
Tia-Kilifi was born in Auckland, New Zealand. He attended Chifley College in Mount Druitt, and St Dominics College in Penrith. Tia-Kilifi played his junior footy for the Minchinbury Jets.

== Playing career ==
Tia-Kilifi made his debut with the Penrith Panthers in 2009, but left the club at the end of the season to sign a two-year contract with the Bulldogs, commencing at the start of the 2010 season.

Tia-Kilifi mostly played for Canterbury's feeder side in the NSW Cup. At the end of the 2011 season, Tia-Kilifi moved back to Penrith in a one-year contract. He then renewed his contract for another season.

In 2015, Tia-Kilifi played for the Auburn Warriors in the Ron Massey Cup. In The 2017 Ron Massey Cup season, Kilifi played for foundation club The Western Suburbs Magpies.

== International career ==
Tia-Kilifi was called up for the Samoa national rugby league team in 2006, but never played.

On 8 September 2014, Tia-Kilifi was named in the Samoa train-on squad for the 2014 Four Nations,
