= Brendan Worth =

Australian rugby league footballer

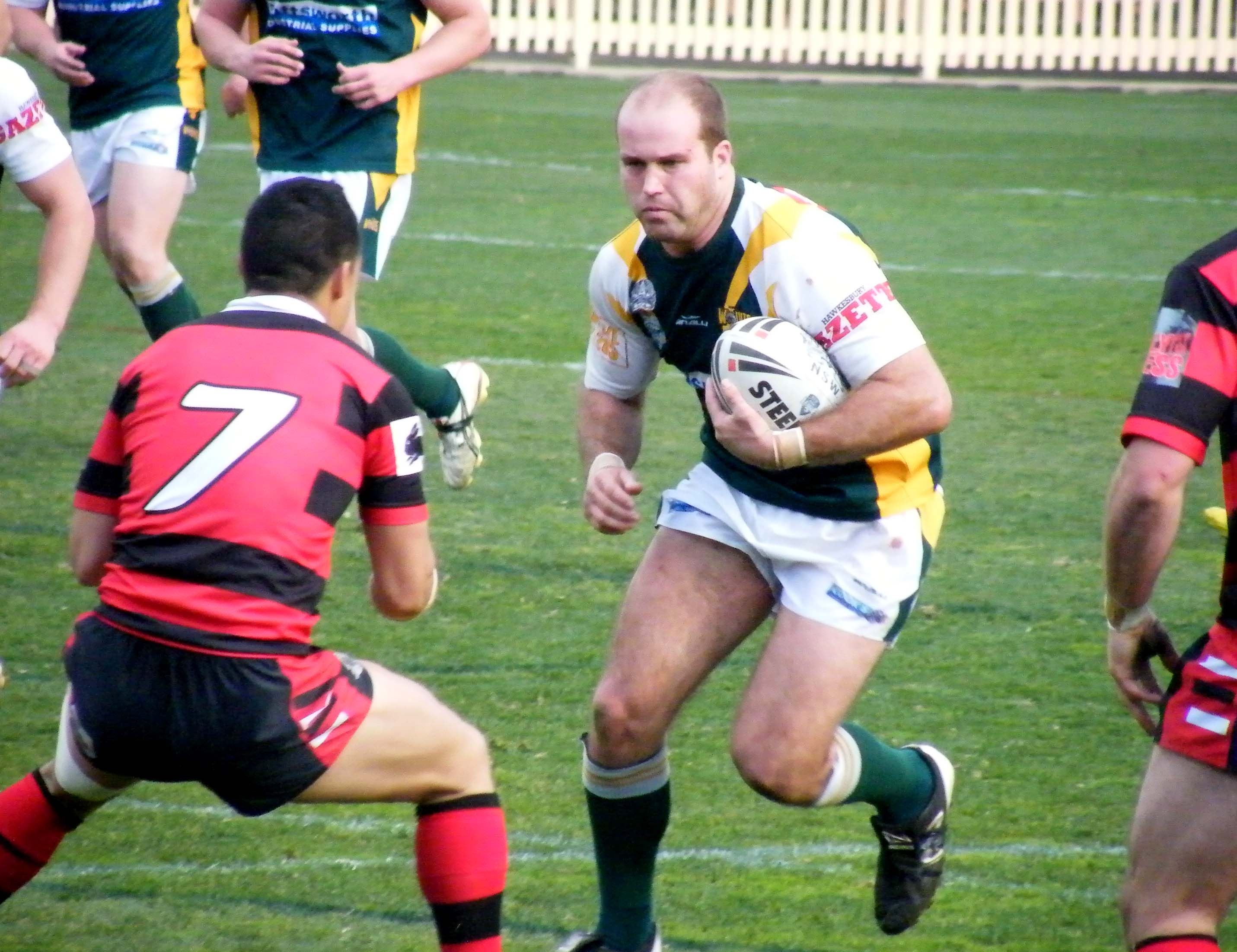

Personal information
- Full name: Brendan Worth
- Born: 18 July 1984 (age 41) Darwin, Northern Territory, Australia
- Height: 187 cm (6 ft 2 in)
- Weight: 104 kg (16 st 5 lb)

Playing information
- Position: Prop
Club
Years	Team	Pld	T	G	FG	P
2005	Newcastle Knights	6	1	0	0	4
2007–08	Penrith Panthers	15	1	0	0	4
2009	Toulouse Olympique	19	0	0	0	0
	Total	40	2	0	0	8
- Source: As of 16 January 2019

Brendan Worth (born 18 July 1984) is an Australian former rugby league footballer who last played for the Cessnock Goannas in the Newcastle Rugby League. Before joining Cessnock, Worth played in the NRL for the Newcastle Knights and the Penrith Panthers and played in France for Toulouse Olympique. Worth's position of choice was as a prop.

== Background ==
Worth was born in Darwin, Northern Territory, Australia.

== Playing career ==
Worth made his first grade debut for Newcastle in round 2 of the 2005 NRL season against Canberra. Worth made a total of six appearances for the club as they finished with the Wooden Spoon. In 2006, Worth signed for Penrith but didn't make his first start for the club until the following year. Worth made a total of seven appearances for Penrith in 2007 as the club finished with the wooden spoon. Worth's appearances in 2008 were limited as he once again spent the majority of the season in the NSW Cup for the Windsor Wolves, making eight appearances, mostly off the bench. He was released at the end of the 2008 season due to salary cap restraints and signed for Toulouse Olympique in France. At the end of the 2009 season, for his first year at Toulouse, Worth received the 2009 Toulouse Player of the Year award from the sang-et-or website.
