= Geoff Daniela =

Cook Islands international rugby league footballer

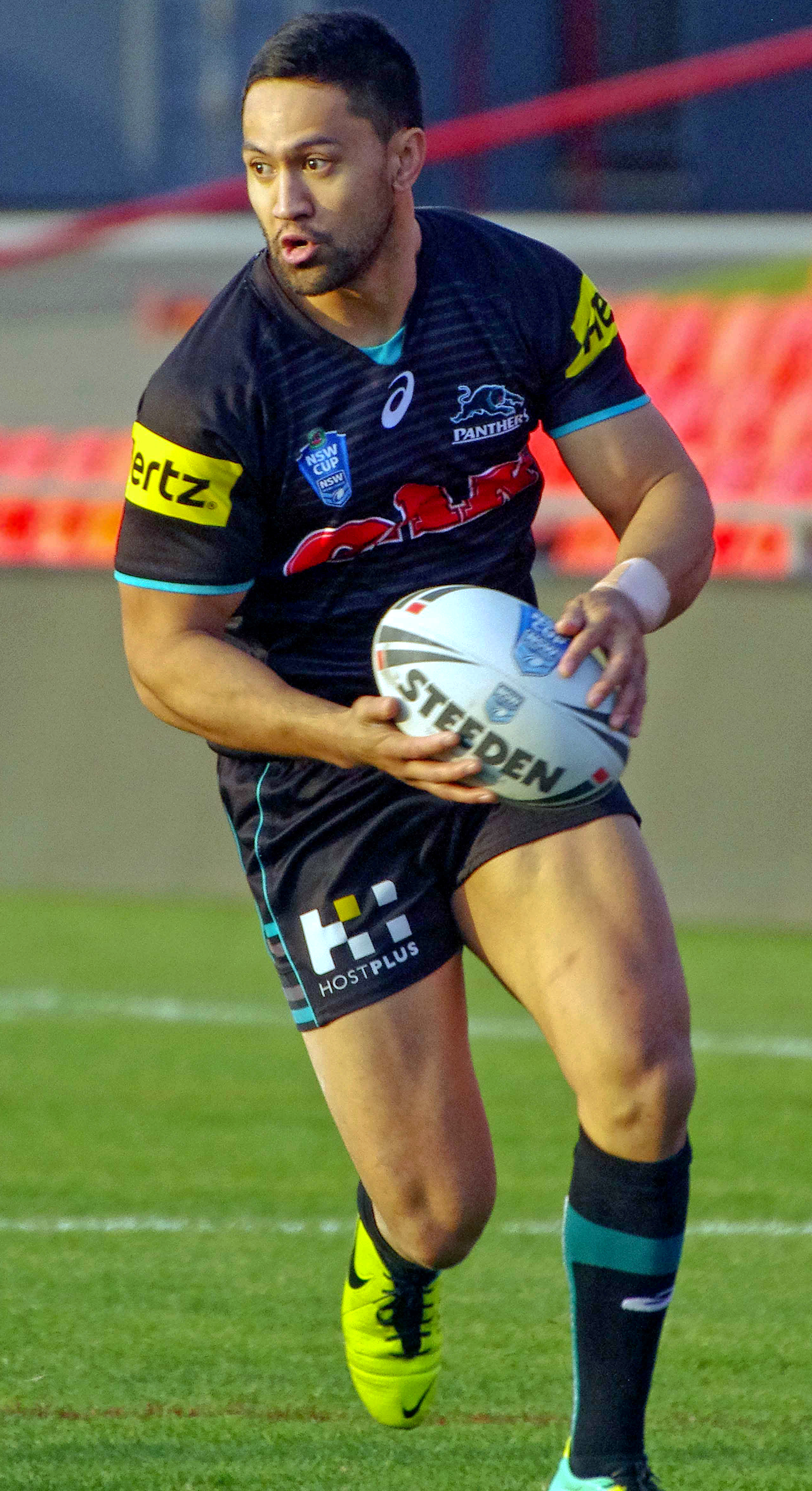

Personal information
- Full name: Geoffrey Daniela
- Born: 28 February 1987 (age 39) Auckland, New Zealand
- Height: 181.5 cm (5 ft 11.5 in)
- Weight: 88 kg (13 st 12 lb)

Playing information
- Position: Centre, Wing
Club
Years	Team	Pld	T	G	FG	P
2007–09	Penrith Panthers	20	13	0	0	52
2010–11	Wests Tigers	15	4	0	0	16
2012–13	Penrith Panthers	10	2	0	0	8
	Total	45	19	0	0	76
Representative
Years	Team	Pld	T	G	FG	P
2012–	Cook Islands	4	3	0	0	12
- Source: As of 7 November 2022

Geoff Daniela (born 28 February 1987) is a Cook Islands international rugby league footballer who plays a centre and winger for the St Mary's Saints in the Ron Massey Cup competition.

He has previously played as a professional for the Penrith Panthers and the Wests Tigers in the National Rugby League.

== Early life ==
Daniela was born in Auckland, New Zealand. He is of Niuean and Cook Islands descent.

He attended school at Hebersham Primary School, Plumpton High School, and St Dominic's College in Sydney, Australia. He played junior rugby league with the Western City Tigers (Mt Druitt), Blacktown Workers and St Mary's Saints. He represented New South Wales at under-17s and under-19s level.

== Playing career ==
Daniela made his NRL debut with Penrith in round 11, 2007, against the Wests Tigers at CUA Stadium. In his three seasons with Penrith he scored 13 tries from just 20 appearances.

Joining the Wests Tigers from 2010, Daniela made 13 appearances in the first season at his new club, either playing at centre or starting from the bench. He scored a hat-trick in a game against the New Zealand Warriors, and played in one semi-final. In 2011, a torn pectoral muscle suffered in round 5 saw him take no further part in the season.

Returning to Penrith in 2012, Daniela played his first game in the 30–0 loss to previous club Wests Tigers. He made 8 appearances in the centres for the season, for only 2 wins. In 2013, Daniela played at centre for the first two weeks of the season, but they were to be his only games in first grade for the year.

On 28 August 2017, Daniela was named in the Ron Massey Cup team of the year.

Daniela captained St Mary's in their 2019 Ron Massey Cup grand final defeat by the Wentworthville Magpies at Leichhardt Oval.

== Representative career ==
Daniela was named in the Cook Islands' squad for the 2009 Pacific Cup, but did not feature in the tournament. He scored a try for the Cook Islands in their match against Lebanon on 7 October 2012.

Daniela was named in Niue's train-on squad for their match against the Philippines on 4 October 2014, but did not play in the game.

He scored two tries for the Cook Islands in their 2017 Pacific Test against Papua New Guinea on 6 May 2017.
