= Nathan Smith (rugby league, born 1983) =

Australian rugby league footballer

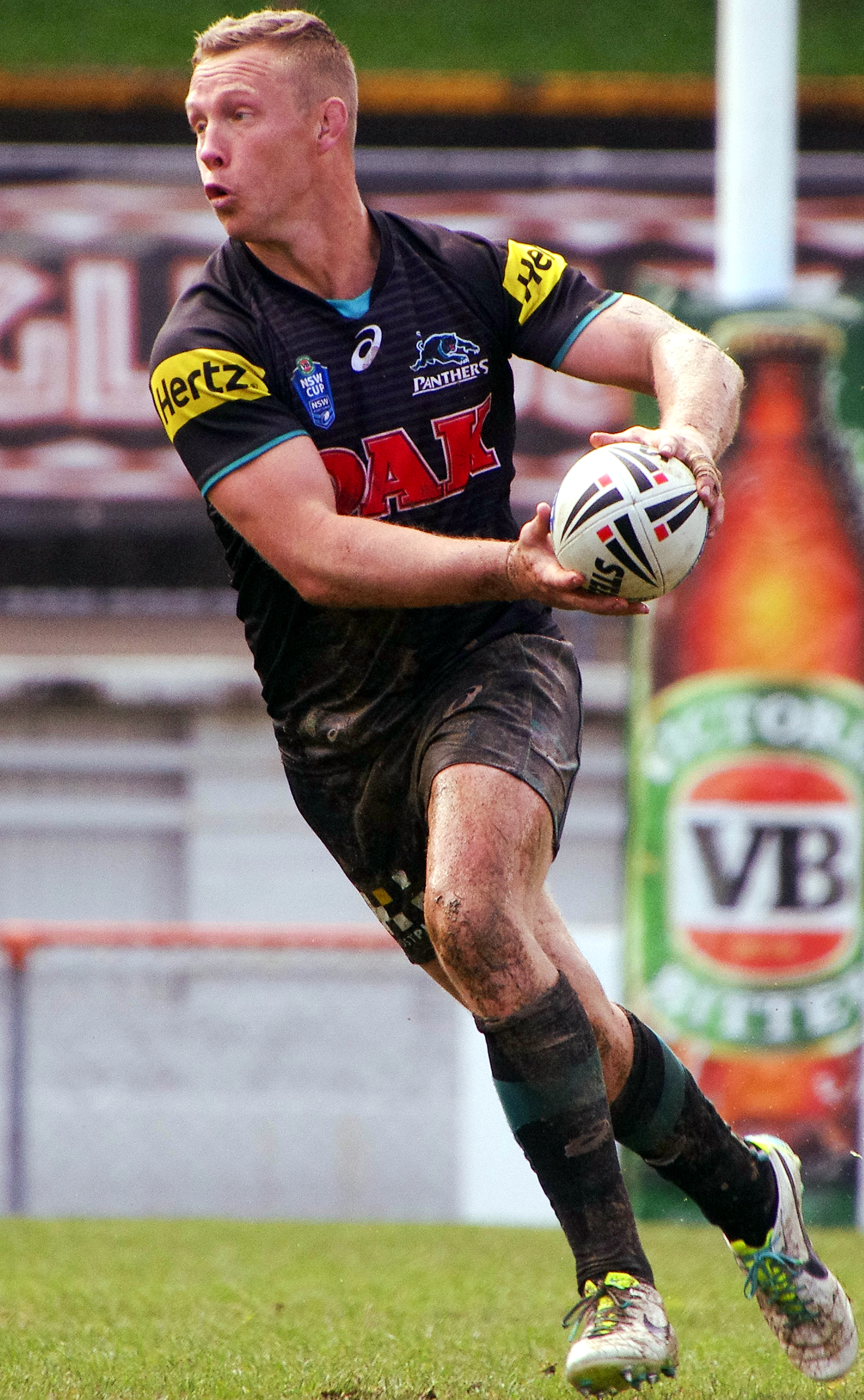

Personal information
- Born: 21 April 1983 (age 43) Canberra, Australian Capital Territory, Australia

Playing information
- Height: 186 cm (6 ft 1 in)
- Weight: 95 kg (14 st 13 lb)
- Position: Lock, Second-row
Club
Years	Team	Pld	T	G	FG	P
2004	Canberra Raiders	7	7	0	0	28
2007–15	Penrith Panthers	121	13	0	0	52
	Total	128	20	0	0	80

Nathan Smith (born 21 April 1983) is an Australian former professional rugby league footballer who played in the 2000s and 2010s. He played at club level in the National Rugby League (NRL) for the Canberra Raiders and the Penrith Panthers, as a second-row or lock.

== Background ==
Smith was born in Canberra, ACT, Australia.

== Career ==
Smith's position of choice is as a lock, however, Smith has also played at second row and centre. He made his first grade debut for Canberra against the North Queensland Cowboys at Canberra Stadium on 10 July 2004.

In his first season at Penrith, Smith played 24 games for the club as they finished last on the table and claimed the wooden spoon.

Smith created headlines in the 2008 NRL season for reneging on a contract with the Canberra Raiders for 2009 and re-signing with Penrith. The Raiders took legal action against Smith and the Panthers for breach of contract, albeit unsuccessfully.

In the 2010 NRL season, Smith played 22 games as Penrith surprised many by finishing second on the table. Smith played in both finals games which ended in defeat.

In 2016, Smith played for the St Mary's Saints in the Ron Massey Cup and captained the side in their Grand Final defeat by Mounties 36–16. In 2017, Smith was part of the St Mary's side which won the minor premiership in the Ron Massey Cup. On 28 August 2017, Smith announced that he would captain the side again in 2018.
