= Luke Covell =

NZ international rugby league footballer

Personal information
- Born: 9 November 1981 (age 45) Goondiwindi, Queensland, Australia

Playing information
- Height: 187 cm (6 ft 2 in)
- Weight: 98 kg (15 st 6 lb)
- Position: Wing
Club
Years	Team	Pld	T	G	FG	P
2003–04	Wests Tigers	22	7	57	0	142
2005–10	Cronulla Sharks	131	55	364	0	948
	Total	153	62	421	0	1090
Representative
Years	Team	Pld	T	G	FG	P
2004	NSW Residents	1	0	2	0	4
2005	NSW Country	1	0	3	0	6
2007	New Zealand	1	0	0	0	0

Luke Covell (born 9 November 1981) is a former New Zealand international rugby league footballer who played as a goal-kicking winger for the Cronulla-Sutherland Sharks and Wests Tigers in the NRL.

He also played at representative level for NSW Country and was described as one of the most respected players in the NRL. Although born and raised in Australia, Covell was eligible to play for New Zealand through his father, making one appearance for the Kiwis in 2007.

== Early life ==
Covell was born in Goondiwindi, Queensland, to a New Zealand father and an Australian mother. He was raised in Murwillumbah, New South Wales, and attended Mt St Patrick's College. Covell played early football for the Murwillumbah Colts.

== NRL career ==
Covell debuted with the Wests Tigers in 2003 at the age of 21. The winger's limited game time saw him join the Cronulla-Sutherland Sharks in 2004.

In 2007, Covell made his Test Debut for New Zealand against Australia, in which a young Australian side defeated the Kiwis 58–0. Covell however was injured in the early minutes of the match and it was to be his sole international appearance.

In 2008, Covell won the Dally M Pointscorer of the Year award, playing a major role in the Cronulla-Sutherland's stellar season. He went on to score over a thousand points in his career.

Covell was known for his lack of speed, but made up for it in determination, and was a fluent goalkicker. "I know some people out there think I'm too slow for the NRL. Not talented enough. But that's okay ... I've always known it too," Covell once said.

In 2010, Covell became the first NRL Player to have (LARS) ligament augmentation and reconstruction surgery. Not long after his return from surgery, he announced he intended to retire at the end of the 2010 season, saying, "I’m proud to say I played for the Cronulla Sharks and Wests Tigers, I’ve had a great time and I wouldn’t change a thing."

== Post-NRL career ==
Covell returned home to play for the Murwillumbah Mustangs in the Northern Rivers Regional Rugby League. He played in the second row and as the team's goalkicker. In 2012, Covell won a premiership with his late penalty goal resulting in the Mustangs overhauling the Grafton Ghosts in the final minutes to win 27–26. Covell played for the Mustangs again in 2013, losing to Ballina in the grand final.

Covell is an Australian Apprenticeships Ambassador for the Australian Government and an Apprentice Mentor in the NRL's Trade UP with the NRL Program.

In 2014, while undertaking a plumbing apprenticeship and studying at TAFE, Covell represented the New South Wales Tertiary team.

His daughter Chloe Covell is an Australian skateboarder, who competed in the women's street event at the 2024 Summer Olympics.
