= Nathan Stapleton =

Australian rugby league footballer

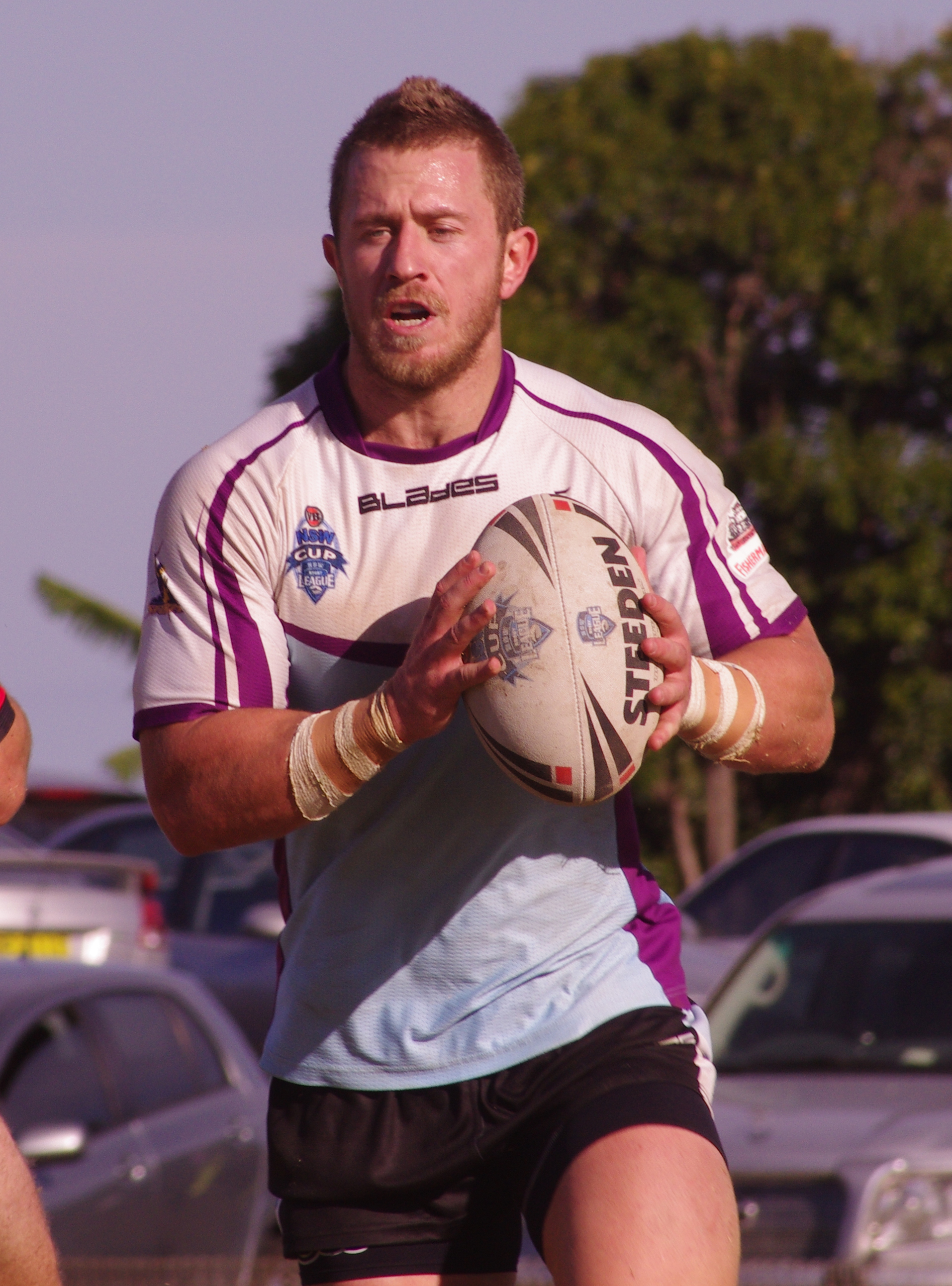

Personal information
- Born: 1 December 1989 (age 36) Deepwater, New South Wales, Australia

Playing information
- Height: 183 cm (6 ft 0 in)
- Weight: 94 kg (14 st 11 lb)
- Position: Wing, Fullback, Centre
Club
Years	Team	Pld	T	G	FG	P
2009–14	Cronulla Sharks	61	17	18	0	104
2016	London Broncos	2	0	0	0	0
	Total	63	17	18	0	104
Representative
Years	Team	Pld	T	G	FG	P
2012	Prime Minister's XIII	1	0	0	0	0
2014	NSW Residents	1	0	2	0	4

Nathan Stapleton (born 1 December 1989) is an Australian professional rugby league footballer who last played for the London Broncos in the Kingstone Press Championship. He previously played for the Cronulla-Sutherland Sharks in the National Rugby League. He primarily played as a wing, fullback and centre.

== Playing career ==
Born in Deepwater, New South Wales, Stapleton played his junior football for Glen Innes Magpies before being signed by the Cronulla-Sutherland Sharks. He played for Cronulla's NYC team in 2008 and 2009.

In Round 11 of the 2009 NRL season, Stapleton made his NRL debut for Cronulla against rivals St. George Illawarra.

In round 5 of the 2014 NRL season, Stapleton scored 4 tries for Cronulla as they defeated the New Zealand Warriors 37–6 at Shark Park.

On 30 June 2014, Stapleton signed with Sydney Roosters mid-season for the remainder of the year.

On 6 August 2015, Stapleton signed with English franchise London Broncos on a one-year deal beginning in 2016.

== Representative career ==
In 2012, Stapleton played for the Prime Minister's XIII.

== Personal life ==
Stapleton is the younger brother of former rugby union player Brett Stapleton.

Stapleton's mother died of cancer in 2013.

In 2022, Stapleton was taken to hospital after sustaining a neck injury in a rugby union match. He was left paralysed from the shoulders down.
