= Siosaia Vave =

Tonga international rugby league footballer

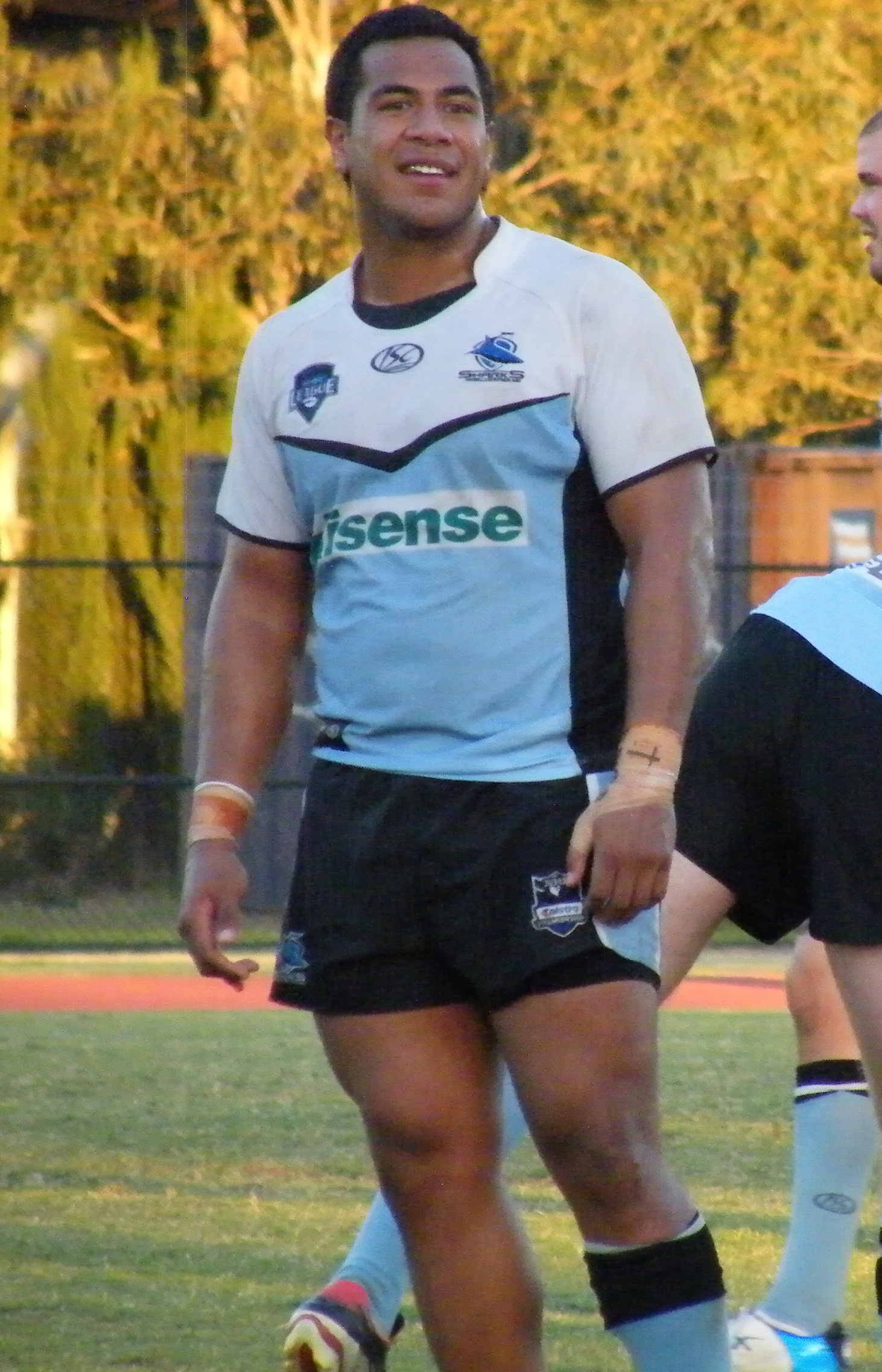

Personal information
- Full name: Siosaia Vave Junior
- Born: 20 May 1989 (age 37) Sydney, New South Wales, Australia
- Height: 188 cm (6 ft 2 in)
- Weight: 115 kg (18 st 2 lb)

Playing information
- Position: Prop
Club
Years	Team	Pld	T	G	FG	P
2010–11	Cronulla Sharks	17	2	0	0	8
2012–13	Melbourne Storm	23	1	0	0	4
2014	Cronulla Sharks	15	0	0	0	0
2016	Manly Sea Eagles	23	1	0	0	4
2017–18	Parramatta Eels	30	3	0	0	12
	Total	108	7	0	0	28
Representative
Years	Team	Pld	T	G	FG	P
2009–17	Tonga	8	0	0	0	0
- Source: As of 27 January 2018

Siosaia Vave (/vɑːveɪ/) is a Tonga international rugby league footballer who plays as a prop for the St Mary's Saints in the Ron Massey Cup. He previously played for the Parramatta Eels, Manly-Warringah Sea Eagles, Cronulla-Sutherland Sharks and the Melbourne Storm in the NRL.

== Background ==
Vave played his junior footy for Western City Tigers Mt Druitt in Western Sydney. He was educated at St Clare Catholic High School, Chifley College and Patrician Brothers' College Blacktown, Vave signed with the Gold Coast Titans and played in the National Youth Competition before signing with the Cronulla Sharks for the 2010 season.

== Playing career ==
After playing 17 games in 2 seasons for Cronulla-Sutherland, he signed with the Melbourne Storm for the 2012 NRL season and made his debut in round 1 against the Canberra Raiders. He was interchange for Storm's 2013 World Club Challenge win over Leeds.

In the 2014 NRL season, Vave returned to Cronulla and played 15 games for them in which turned out to be one of the toughest in the club's history with the side finishing last on the table and claiming the wooden spoon.

On 28 October 2014, Vave signed with the Manly-Warringah Sea Eagles on a deal commencing in the 2015 NRL season.

On 7 May 2016, Vave played for Tonga against Samoa in the 2016 Polynesian Cup, playing off the interchange bench in the 18-6 loss at Parramatta Stadium. Vave made his debut for the Parramatta Eels in round 4 against Cronulla-Sutherland in a losing effort. He scored his first try for the Eels against the Canberra Raiders on his birthday in a losing effort.

In the 2017 NRL season, Vave made 18 appearances for Parramatta as he was part of the side that finished fourth place on the ladder. In 2018, Vave was not selected to play first grade by coach Brad Arthur for the first 9 rounds of the season due to fitness problems but was called up to the side for the round 10 match against Canterbury.

At the end of the 2018 season, Parramatta finished last on the table claiming its 14th wooden spoon and Vave was released by the club.

In January 2019, Vave joined the Ron Massey Cup side St Mary's Saints.

On 25 September 2019, Vave signed a contract to join Group 10 countryside the Blayney Bears.

== Controversy ==
In February 2020, it was revealed that Vave would not be required to play for Blayney after it was alleged that Vave had pocketed $5,000 courtesy of a signing on fee he initially obtained after joining the club. Vave subsequently went missing with club officials attempting to phone Vave to no avail. Vave had also reportedly borrowed $2,400 from Blayney's club president Damon Taylor and had borrowed $4,000 from a teammate at St Mary's in 2019. Taylor spoke to the media saying "He's gone missing, I'm gutted, the club had thought it had kicked a dead set goal but that's gone now.

== Statistics ==
Year	Team	Games	Tries	Pts
2010	Cronulla-Sutherland Sharks	14	2	8
2011	Cronulla-Sutherland Sharks	3		
2012	Melbourne Storm	14		
2013	Melbourne Storm	9	1	4
2014	Cronulla-Sutherland Sharks	15		
2016	Manly Warringah Sea Eagles	23	1	4
2017	Parramatta Eels	18	1	4
2018	Parramatta Eels	12	2	8
	Totals	108	7	28
