= Michael Jennings (rugby league) =

Australia, Tonga, and Fiji international rugby league footballer

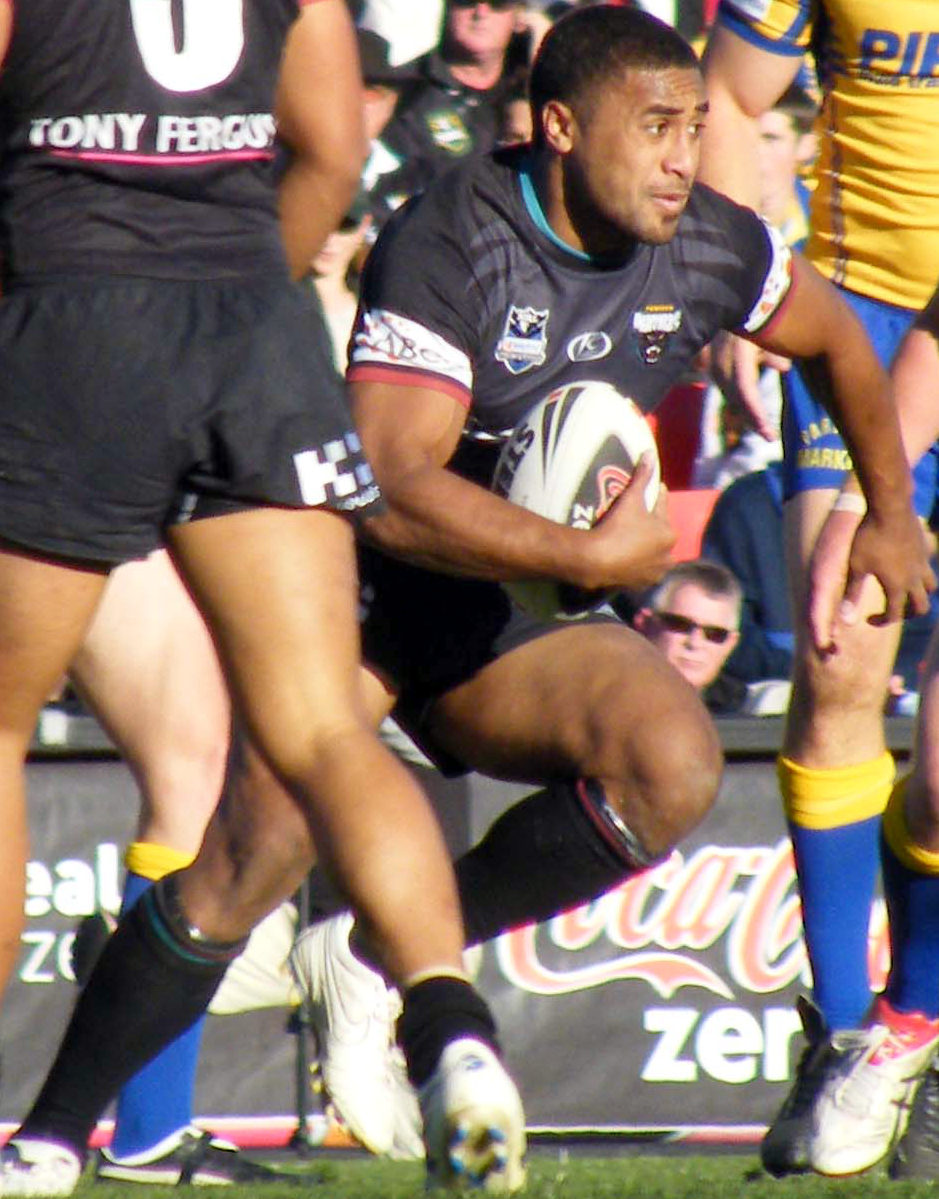

Personal information
- Full name: Michael Jennings
- Born: 20 April 1988 (age 38) Blacktown, New South Wales, Australia
- Height: 180 cm (5 ft 11 in)
- Weight: 96 kg (15 st 2 lb)

Playing information
- Position: Centre
Club
Years	Team	Pld	T	G	FG	P
2007–12	Penrith Panthers	122	71	0	0	284
2013–15	Sydney Roosters	71	41	0	0	164
2016–20	Parramatta Eels	105	42	0	0	168
2024	Sydney Roosters	9	3	0	0	12
	Total	307	157	0	0	628
Representative
Years	Team	Pld	T	G	FG	P
2008–12	Prime Minister's XIII	4	5	0	0	20
2008–19	Tonga	12	10	0	0	40
2009–13	City Origin	4	1	0	0	4
2009–16	New South Wales	18	6	0	0	24
2009–15	Australia	7	6	0	0	24
2010–12	NRL All Stars	3	1	0	0	4
2024–25	Fiji	3	3	0	0	12
- Source: As of 1 September 2024
- Relatives: George Jennings (brother); Robert Jennings (brother); Arthur Jennings (uncle)

Michael Jennings (born 20 April 1988) is a semi-professional rugby league footballer who plays as a centre for the St Mary's Saints in the Ron Massey Cup. He previously played for Penrith Panthers, Sydney Roosters and Parramatta Eels in the NRL. He has played for Tonga, Australia, and, most recently, Fiji (2024 Pacific Championships) at international level.

While playing for the Roosters, he won the 2013 NRL Grand Final, scoring the final try in the match. He has played for the Prime Minister's XIII, City Origin, New South Wales in the State of Origin series and the NRL All Stars.

== Background ==
Jennings was born in Blacktown, New South Wales, Australia, to Tongan-born parents. He is also of Fijian and English descent. Jennings is older brother of Melbourne Storm player George Jennings and Penrith Panthers player Robert Jennings, and nephew of 1960s All Black Arthur Jennings.

He played his junior football for the Western City Tigers Mt Druitt and St Mary's Saints before being signed by the Penrith Panthers. Jennings played for the Australian Schoolboys team in 2005. Jennings attended Blackett Primary School and St Dominic's College.

== Playing career ==
=== 2007 ===
In Round 2, Jennings made his NRL debut for the Penrith Panthers against the Canterbury-Bankstown Bulldogs on the wing, scoring a try in the Panthers 40–10 victory at Penrith Stadium. In Round 23 against the Newcastle Knights, he scored a hat trick in the Panthers 46–12 win at Hunter Stadium. At the end of the year, Jennings was the Panthers highest tryscorer with 15 tries in 23 matches. He won the Panthers Player of the Year award and the Rookie of the Year award as well as being nominated for the Dally M Rookie of the Year. In October, Jennings played for the Junior Kangaroos.

=== 2008 ===
Jennings played in 23 matches and scored 12 tries for the Panthers in the 2008.

He played for the Prime Minister's XIII team against Papua New Guinea and scored a try on debut.

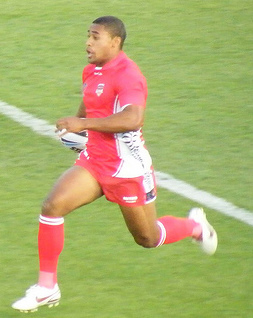
Jennings playing for Tonga in 2008

Jennings was named in the preliminary 46-man Australian and Tongan squads for the 2008 World Cup. He eventually represented Tonga, scoring 3 tries in as many appearances.

=== 2009 ===
On 8 May, Jennings played for the New South Wales City team against New South Wales Country, scoring a try in the 40–18 win in Orange. In May, he was selected for New South Wales in Game 1 of the 2009 State of Origin series in Melbourne, Victoria. Jennings missed Game 2 but was again selected in Game 3 in the Blues 28–16 win at Suncorp Stadium. Jennings played in 19 matches and was the Panthers highest tryscorer with 17 tries, including 3 hat tricks. In September, Jennings was again selected in the Prime Minister's XIII squad, scoring another hat trick in the 42–18 win against Papua New Guinea.

In October and November, Jennings travelled to Europe with the Australian team for the 2009 Four Nations. He made his debut for the Kangaroos in the match against France and scored 3 tries as well as receiving the Man of the Match award in the 42–4 win. Jennings became the 4th Kangaroo, following Lionel Morgan in 1960, Brad Mackay in 1990 and David Williams in 2008, to score a hat trick on debut.

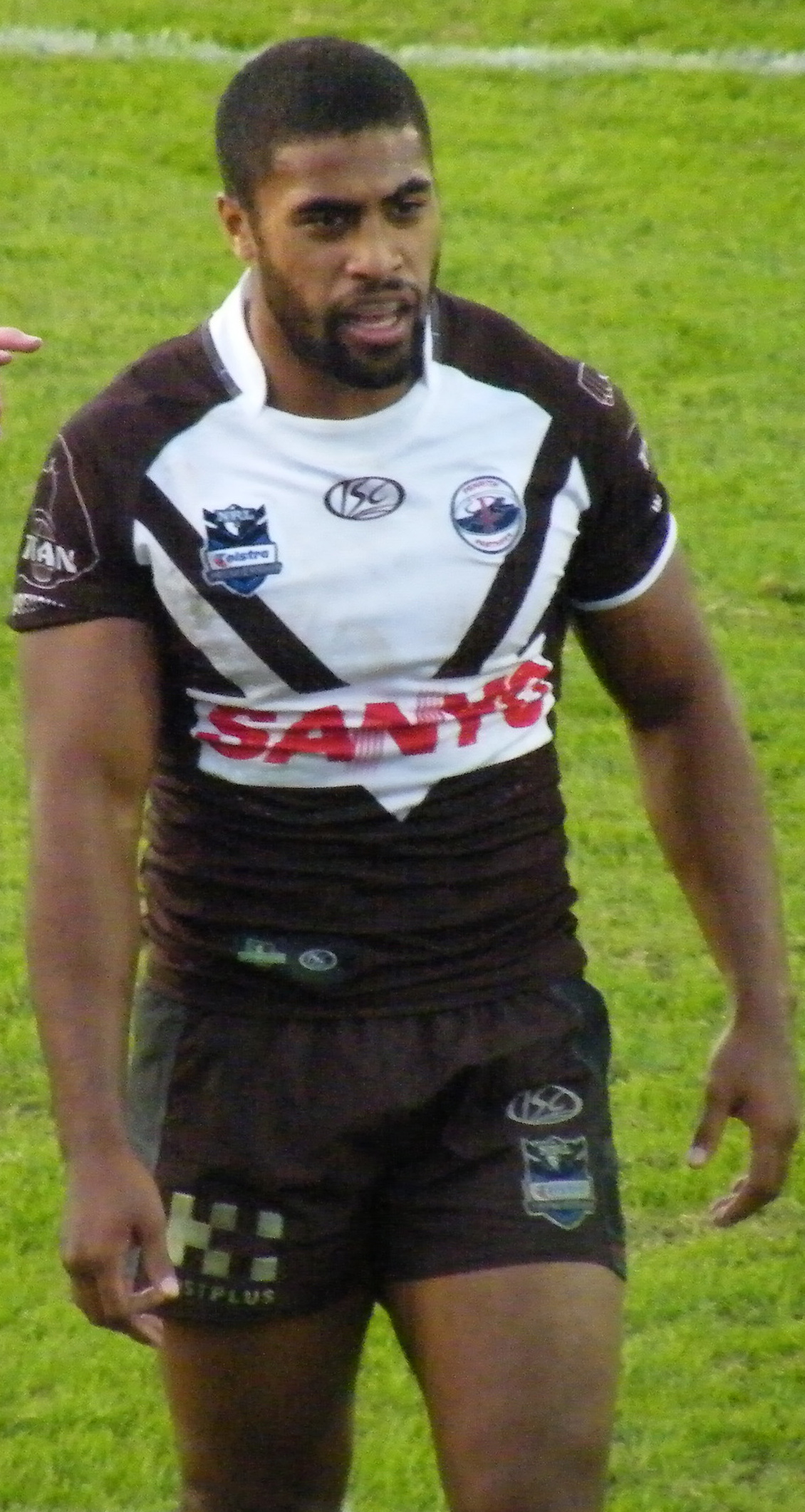
Jennings playing for the Panthers in 2010

=== 2010 ===
On 13 February, Jennings played for the inaugural NRL All Stars team against the Indigenous All Stars at Cbus Super Stadium. He played at centre and scored a try in the NRL All Stars 16–12 win. On 7 May, Jennings played for NSW City Origin. He again played for NSW in Game 3 of the 2010 State of Origin series in the Blues 23–18 loss. Jennings played in 25 matches and 16 tries in the regular season.

=== 2011 ===
Jennings started the pre-season with another appearance for the NRL All Stars, and played for City Origin in May. On 12 August, Jennings was dropped from the Panthers team for showing up to training under the influence of alcohol. He was also fined $10,000 earlier in 2011 for drinking and it had been understood that he was on his last chance at the club. Jennings season was marred by numerous injuries, off-field controversies and he only scored 4 tries during the whole year, 1 at State of Origin level, 1 at club level and 2 whilst playing for the Windsor Wolves in the NSW Cup. Controversially, he was still selected for NSW despite his poor start, and scored a try and was rated as one of the best in a 16-12 beaten team in game 1. In Round 13 against the Gold Coast Titans, Jennings played his 100th NRL career match for the Panthers in the 23–10 win at Cbus Super Stadium. He managed 15 games for the Panthers for the year On 19 September, Jennings played for the Prime Minister's XIII.

=== 2012 ===
Jennings was chosen for the NRL All Stars for the 3rd consecutive year. He played in all 3 matches for NSW in the 2012 State of Origin series. For Game 1, Jennings became the first player in 30 years to be selected for New South Wales from reserve-grade after being dropped from the Panthers first-grade team. Throughout the season, rumours surrounded Jennings and his situation at the club, with speculation that Jennings was out of favour with the Panthers Coaching Director, Phil Gould, and that the club was trying to release Jennings to free up salary cap space. Jennings played in 17 matches and scored 10 tries for the Panthers in what was to be his last year with the club. On 23 September, Jennings played for Prime Minister's XIII in the 24–18 win over Papua New Guinea.

=== 2013 ===
On 15 January, after months of speculation, Jennings signed a 4-year contract with the Sydney Roosters, after being officially released by the Panthers.

On 21 April, Jennings played for NSW City Origin in their 18–12 loss. Jennings played in all 3 State of Origin games in 2013, scoring a solo try in Game 1 in the 14–6 win. On 6 October, Jennings played in the 2013 NRL Grand Final at centre with the Roosters being victorious over the Manly-Warringah Sea Eagles 26–18. Jennings scored to seal the victory with a spectacular try from a James Maloney grubber, beating two Manly players with his speed to ground the ball. Jennings was the Roosters highest tryscorer with 20 tries in 26 matches in an excellent year. After winning the premiership, he was named in the Kangaroos 24-man squad for the 2013 World Cup, scoring a try in his sole appearance against Fiji.

=== 2014 ===
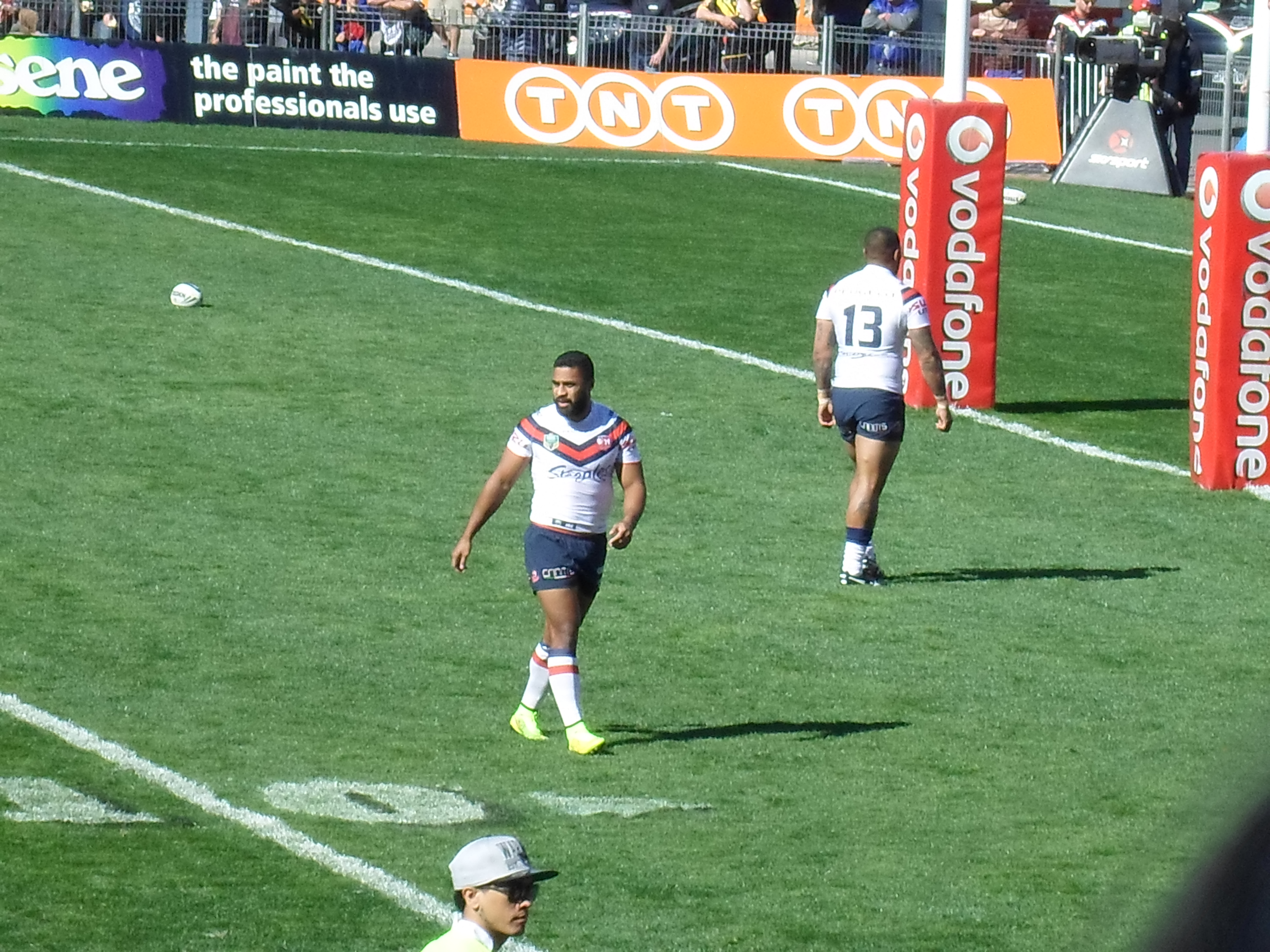
Michael Jennings during the warm up before a Roosters game, 2014

Before the season, the Roosters hosted the Wigan Warriors for the 2014 World Club Challenge match. Jennings became the first player in World Club Challenge history to score three tries as the Australian premiers won 36–14 at SFS. Jennings scored the first try in the 2014 NRL season in the Roosters 28–8 loss to the South Sydney Rabbitohs at ANZ Stadium. In Round 2 against the Parramatta Eels, Jennings played his 150th NRL career match in the Roosters 56-4 smashing win at SFS. Jennings was selected for NSW in Game 1 of the 2014 State of Origin series in the 100th State of Origin Match in the 12–8 win at Suncorp Stadium. In game 2 of the series, he was a member of the team that won 6–4, resulting in the Blues breaking their 8-year losing streak. In Round 23, against the Wests Tigers at Leichhardt Oval, Jennings scored his 100th NRL career try in a 48–4 win. He scored 13 tries from his 21 Roosters games. At the end of the season, he played for Australia in the Four Nations, scoring a try in the 22–18 loss to New Zealand.

=== 2015 ===
For the 2015 Anzac Test, Jennings played at centre in the Kangaroos 26–12 loss. He played in all 3 matches of the 2015 State of Origin series, scoring 2 tries in the Blues 2–1 series loss, and was awarded the Man of the Match in game two. He scored 8 tries in his 21 games for the Roosters.

On 20 June, Jennings was arrested and charged with offensive behaviour after he approached officers in an aggressive manner after his younger brother Panthers player Robert Jennings was spoken to after he allegedly kicked a boom gate in the Erby Place carpark. They were publicly intoxicated in Parramatta directly following Jennings's successful second Origin match. Jennings received a 1 match suspension from the Roosters. On 20 July, Jennings pleaded not guilty to charges of offensive behaviour and hindering police, claiming that he and his brother were victims of racial profiling by police. On 14 December, he was handed a 12-month good behaviour bond after being found guilty of behaving in an offensive manner in a public place.

=== 2016 ===
On 18 January, Jennings signed a 4-year contract with the Parramatta Eels starting effective immediately, after being released from the final year of his Roosters contract. In Round 1 of the 2016 NRL season, Jennings made his club debut for the Parramatta Eels in the season opening match against the Brisbane Broncos, playing at centre in the Eels 17–4 loss at Parramatta Stadium. In Round 3 against the Canterbury-Bankstown Bulldogs, Jennings scored his first club try for the Eels in the 20–6 win at ANZ Stadium. In Round 7 against the Manly-Warringah Sea Eagles, Jennings played his 200th NRL career match in the Eels 22–10 win at Brookvale Oval. Jennings played in all 3 matches for New South Wales in the 2016 State of Origin series. Jennings had a mixed performance in the series, in Game 2 at Suncorp Stadium, Jennings bombed a certain try for the Blues in the 70th minute when they were trailing 20-16 and later Queensland scored through Corey Oates, the victory going to the Maroons 26-16 and resulting in the Blues losing the series 2–1. But later in Game 3, Jennings scored the winning try for the Blues in the 79th minute to win the match 18–14, just avoiding a Queensland clean sweep of 3 wins. Jennings finished his first year with the Parramatta Eels with him playing in 19 matches and scoring 9 tries in the 2016 NRL season.

=== 2017 ===
In Round 2 against the St George Illawarra Dragons, Jennings had a match in the 34–16 win at WIN Stadium, where he set up two tries for Semi Radradra who had scored 4 tries in the match, one the tries he set up, throwing a pass through his legs, Fox Sports commentator and the recently retired Michael Ennis commenting, “Jennings has been brilliant. He's shown all sorts of class, when you’ve got someone of Radradra's class outside you, that combination is obviously sheer brilliance, I think that's the best half of football I’ve seen Jennings play in the last 18 months.”.

Jennings was part of The Parramatta side which finished fourth at the end of the regular season and qualified for the finals for the first time since 2009. Jennings scored a last minute try in Parramatta's shock finals defeat by North Queensland going down 24–16. At the end of the season, Jennings elected to play for Tonga at the 2017 rugby league world cup. Jennings was part of the side that made it all that way to the semi-final before losing to England.

=== 2018 ===
Jennings scored his first try of the season for Parramatta in their 44–10 victory over Manly in Round 7. On 24 May, Jennings lost the ball over the try line twice in Parramatta's 18–10 defeat by Brisbane leaving the club with only 2 wins from the first 12 rounds of the season. On 2 June 2018, Jennings was sent to the sin bin for the second time in consecutive weeks after putting an illegal hit on a Newcastle player attempting to score a try in Parramatta's 30–4 defeat leaving the club last on the table. On 14 June, Jennings played his 250th first grade game against Souths on a night in which his brother Robert Jennings who was playing for the opposition scored 4 tries in Souths 42–24 victory. On 5 July, Jennings was demoted to reserve grade by coach Brad Arthur after a number of poor performances. In Round 25 of the NRL season, Jennings was sin binned for the third time in the year during Parramatta's heavy 44–10 loss against the Sydney Roosters where the club finished last and earned their 14th wooden spoon. Jennings was filmed by cameras in the change room after he was sin binned, openly crying and having to be consoled by Parramatta officials.

He retained his place in the Tongan squad for the historic first-ever Test match between Tonga and the Australian Kangaroos on 20 October 2018, played in front of a sold-out crowd at Mount Smart Stadium, Auckland.

=== 2019 ===
Jennings started the 2019 season as one of Parramatta's first choice centres despite his drop in form during the 2018 season. Jennings scored 2 tries for Parramatta in Round 1 as they defeated Penrith 20-12 although Jennings was sin binned for a high tackle on Isaah Yeo. In Round 4, Jennings scored 2 tries including the match winner as Parramatta defeated Cronulla 24–12. In Round 6, Jennings scored his third brace of the season as he scored 2 tries in Parramatta's 51–6 victory over Wests Tigers in the opening game at the new Western Sydney Stadium.

In Round 14 against Brisbane, Jennings scored a try as Parramatta won the match 38–10 at Western Sydney Stadium.

At the end of the 2019 regular season, Parramatta finished 5th on the table and qualified for the finals. In the elimination final against Brisbane, Jennings scored a try as Parramatta won the match 58–0 at the new Western Sydney Stadium. The victory was the biggest finals win in history, eclipsing Newtown's 55–7 win over St George in 1944. The match was also Parramatta's biggest win over Brisbane and Brisbane's worst ever loss since entering the competition in 1988.

On 6 December, Jennings signed a two-year contract extension to remain at Parramatta until the end of 2021.

=== 2020 ===
In round 10 of the 2020 NRL season, Jennings scored two tries as Parramatta lost the match 22–18 against Manly-Warringah at Brookvale Oval. With the two tries Jennings scored, it moved him into the top ten highest try scorers list in the competition's history. On 24 July, Jennings extended his contract with Parramatta until 2022.

On October 9, Jennings was provisionally suspended from playing after testing positive to LGD-4033 (Ligandrol) - A drug similar in its chemical structure to anabolic steroids - And its metabolite Di-hydroxy-LGD-4033, and also Ibutamoren - A human growth hormone - And its metabolites Desbenzyl Ibutamoren and OH Ibutamoren. Each of those substances is prohibited by the World Anti-Doping agency and the NRL's anti-doping policy.

Jennings was suspended on the same day Parramatta were due to play against the South Sydney Rabbitohs in the 2020 elimination final.

=== 2021 ===
On 4 May, Jennings contract with Parramatta was ended by mutual consent.

On 15 October, Jennings accepted a three-year ban from playing rugby league for doping in relation to the failed drugs test which happened 12 months prior.

=== 2024 ===
In round 5 of the 2024 NRL season, Jennings was named as 18th man for the Sydney Roosters match against Canterbury. Jennings later took to the field in the game as the Sydney Roosters had players forced off the field due to HIA protocols. It was Jennings first game in the NRL for almost four years. Jennings played a role in one of the Sydney Roosters final tries, maneuvering a quick pass to set up his teammate for a try.

The following week, Jennings played his 300th first grade game in the Sydney Roosters 22–20 victory over Newcastle. Before the match, due to his history of doping and rape, the NRL said that they would not be acknowledging or celebrating the player's milestone. On 28 September, it was announced that Jennings would be departing the club come seasons end.

Jennings was selected to play centre for Fiji in the 2024 Pacific Championships.

=== 2025 ===
On 7 March, Jennings signed a contract to join Ron Massey Cup side St Mary's. On 13 September, Jennings played in St Mary's Ron Massey Cup Grand Final victory over Wentworthville.

== Personal life ==
In February 2020, Kirra Wilden sued her former husband Jennings, alleging she was raped by Jennings multiple times during their relationship in 2014 and 2015.

In December 2021, The New South Wales District Court awarded his ex-wife $500,000 in damages after Wilden successfully sued Jennings over these incidents

On 14 March 2023, Jennings lost an appeal against the New South Wales District Court's decision to award his ex-wife $750,000 in damages after she successfully sued him for multiple instances of alleged rape during their relationship in 2014 and 2015.
