= 2010 Canberra Raiders season =

- NRL Rank: 7th
- 2010 record: Wins: 13; draws: 0; losses: 11
- Points scored: For: 499; against: 493

Team information
- CEO Chairman: Don Furner Jr. John McIntyre
- Coach: David Furner
- Captain: Alan Tongue
- Stadium: Canberra Stadium

Top scorers
- Tries: Daniel Vidot 16
- Goals: Jarrod Croker 53
- Points: Jarrod Croker 126
← 2009	List of seasons	2011 →

The 2010 Canberra Raiders season was the 29th in the club's history. They competed in the NRL's 2010 Telstra Premiership and finished the regular season 7th (out of 16). They then proceeded as far as the second week of the finals when they were knocked out by the Wests Tigers.

== Season summary ==
The 2010 season began poorly for the Raiders with a loss to Penrith in the opening round however against early-season expectations that the Raiders would again struggle the club posted early season wins over Brisbane in round two, Parramatta in round five and the New Zealand Warriors in round eight in New Zealand in what was the club's first win in New Zealand since the early 2000s. However, losses to Todd Carney's new club the Roosters in round six and a narrow loss at home to the South Sydney Rabbitohs in round seven saw the club sitting second from last after round seven (last had the Melbourne Storm not been stripped of competition points due to salary cap breaches) of the 2010 season. Wins over the ladder-leading Dragons and the Gold Coast Titans followed until a four-game losing streak ensued; with the club sitting third from last after a round 17 home loss to the Roosters in what was Todd Carney's return to the nation's capital. The Raiders then began a run similar to that of Parramatta last year; winning eight of their next nine regular season matches to sneak into the top eight by season's end. The regular season's highest home attendance came when 20,445 fans filled Canberra Stadium to see the Raiders defeat the ladder-leading Dragons 32-16 for the second time in the season.

The Raiders advanced to the finals on the back of eight wins from their past nine and were drawn a tough away final against the second-placed Penrith Panthers whom the Raiders had beaten just five weeks earlier. The Raiders led from the start and despite lapses at times during the match they managed a narrow 24–22 win, thus achieving its first final win in a decade, which was also against the Panthers. This saw the Raiders draw a home final against the Wests Tigers in round two of the finals. Having lost to the Tigers twice during the regular season, it was hoped that a record crowd of 26,746 would inspire the Raiders to continue their fairytale run deep into the finals, however a missed penalty attempt by Jarrod Croker in the final minutes of the match saw Canberra lose by 26–24 and therefore draw a curtain on the Raiders' 2010 season.

== Results ==
Trial Games
Round	Opponent	Result	Can.	Opp.	Date	Venue		Crowd
Trial 1	Western Suburbs Magpies	Win	20	12	13 Feb	Southwell Park		
Trial 2	Brisbane Broncos	Loss	24	32	20 Feb	Ballymore Stadium		
Trial 3	Canterbury-Bankstown Bulldogs	Loss	12	22	27 Feb	APEX Oval		8,050
NRL Regular Season Games
Round	Opponent	Result	Can.	Opp.	Date	Venue	Crowd	Position
1	Penrith Panthers	Loss	16	34	13 Mar	CUA Stadium	11,133	15/16
2	Brisbane Broncos	Win	22	14	22 Mar	Canberra Stadium	14,200	12/16
3	Gold Coast Titans	Loss	4	24	27 Mar	Skilled Park	11,521	14/16
4	Wests Tigers	Loss	22	35	4 Apr	Canberra Stadium	17,112	15/16
5	Parramatta Eels	Win	24	12	12 Apr	Parramatta Stadium	15,122	11/16
6	Sydney Roosters	Loss	6	36	17 Apr	Sydney Football Stadium	9,308	15-14/16*
7	South Sydney Rabbitohs	Loss	24	26	25 Apr	Canberra Stadium	13,145	15/16
8	New Zealand Warriors	Win	23	16	1 May	Mt Smart Stadium	11,499	12/16
9	BYE				8–10 May			11/16
10	Melbourne Storm	Loss	6	17	15 May	Canberra Stadium	12,165	13/16
11	St. George-Illawarra Dragons	Win	22	14	23 May	WIN Stadium	14,728	11/16
12	BYE				28–31 May			10/16
13	Gold Coast Titans	Win	28	24	6 Jun	Canberra Stadium	10,425	10/16
14	North Queensland Cowboys	Loss	8	16	12 Jun	Dairy Farmers Stadium	12,058	11/16
15	Wests Tigers	Loss	8	12	20 Jun	Leichhardt Oval	19,428	11/16
16	Canterbury-Bankstown Bulldogs	Loss	10	18	28 Jun	Canberra Stadium	11,194	12/16
17	Sydney Roosters	Loss	12	22	4 Jul	Canberra Stadium	10,767	14/16
18	Manly-Warringah Sea Eagles	Win	24	22	10 July	Brookvale Oval	10,027	13/16
19	Newcastle Knights	Win	52	18	18 July	Canberra Stadium	9,459	11/16
20	Cronulla Sharks	Win	20	13	24 July	Canberra Stadium	9,280	11/16
21	Melbourne Storm	Loss	12	36	1 Aug	AAMI Park	9,112	12/16
22	Penrith Panthers	Win	30	26	9 Aug	Canberra Stadium	8,850	11/16
23	Canterbury-Bankstown Bulldogs	Win	28	14	14 Aug	ANZ Stadium	10,116	11/16
24	St. George-Illawarra Dragons	Win	32	16	22 Aug	Canberra Stadium	20,445	9/16
25	North Queensland Cowboys	Win	48	4	28 Aug	Canberra Stadium	11,434	8/16
26	Brisbane Broncos	Win	18	16	3 Sep	Suncorp Stadium	38,872	7/16
NRL Finals Games
Round	Opponent	Result	Can.	Opp.	Date	Venue		Crowd
QF	Penrith Panthers	Win	24	22	11 Sep	CUA Stadium		16,668
SF	Wests Tigers	Loss	24	26	17 Sep	Canberra Stadium		26,476

Colour	Result
Green	Win
Red	Loss
Yellow	Golden point Win
Blue	Bye

*Finished round in 15th but promoted to 14th after Melbourne were stripped of competition points

== Club awards ==
Award	Winner
Mal Meninga Medal	David Shillington
Coaches Award	Daniel Vidot
Rookie of the Year	Sam Mataora
Fred Daly Memorial Clubman of the Year Trophy	Dane Tilse
National Youth Competition Player of the Year	Mark Nicholls
National Youth Competition Coaches Award	Sam Williams
Gordon McLucas Memorial Award (Junior representative player of the year)	Jack Wighton
Geoff Caldwell Memorial Award (Vocational Encouragement)	Mark Appleton

== 2010 squad ==
No.

Position
Player

Glen Buttriss – HK Terry Campese – FE Jarrod Croker – CE Josh Dugan – FB Shaun Fensom – LK Danny Galea – SR Bronson Harrison – SR Marc Herbert – HB Cy Lasscock – SR Tom Learoyd-Lahrs – SR Scott Logan – PR Drury Low – WG Sam Mataora – SR Josh McCrone – HB Josh Miller – PR

No.

Position
Player

David Milne – FB Adam Mogg – FE Joel Monaghan – CE Joe Picker – SR Reece Robinson – WG David Shillington – PR James Stuart – CE Joel Thompson – CE Troy Thompson – PR Trevor Thurling – SR Dane Tilse – PR Alan Tongue – LK Daniel Vidot – WG Travis Waddell – HK

=== Preseason transfers ===
IN

- Danny Galea (from Wests Tigers)
- Reece Robinson (from Brisbane Broncos)

OUT

- Phil Graham (to Sydney Roosters)
- Nigel Plum (to Penrith Panthers)
- Adrian Purtell (to Penrith Panthers)
- Stuart Flanagan (to Cronulla Sharks)
- Glen Turner (Retired)

=== Midseason transfers ===
IN

- Adam Mogg (from Catalans Dragons)

== Ladders ==
2010 NRL season
Pos.	Team	Pld	W	D	L	B	PF	PA	PD	Pts
1	St. George Illawarra Dragons (P)	24	17	0	7	2	518	299	+219	38
2	Penrith Panthers	24	15	0	9	2	645	489	+156	34
3	Wests Tigers	24	15	0	9	2	537	503	+34	34
4	Gold Coast Titans	24	15	0	9	2	520	498	+22	34
5	New Zealand Warriors	24	14	0	10	2	539	486	+53	32
6	Sydney Roosters	24	14	0	10	2	559	510	+49	32
7	Canberra Raiders	24	13	0	11	2	499	493	+6	30
8	Manly Warringah Sea Eagles	24	12	0	12	2	545	510	+35	28
9	South Sydney Rabbitohs	24	11	0	13	2	584	567	+17	26
10	Brisbane Broncos	24	11	0	13	2	508	535	−27	26
11	Newcastle Knights	24	10	0	14	2	499	569	−70	24
12	Parramatta Eels	24	10	0	14	2	413	491	−78	24
13	Canterbury-Bankstown Bulldogs	24	9	0	15	2	494	539	−45	22
14	Cronulla-Sutherland Sharks	24	7	0	17	2	354	609	−255	18
15	North Queensland Cowboys	24	5	0	19	2	425	667	−242	14
16	Melbourne Storm	24	14	0	10	2	489	363	+126	0^{1}

^{1} Melbourne were deducted eight premiership points and barred from receiving premiership points for the rest of the season due to gross long-term salary cap breaches.

National Youth Competition season 2010
	Team	Pld	W	D	L	B	PF	PA	PD	Pts
1	South Sydney Rabbitohs	24	17	0	7	2	687	567	+120	38
2	New Zealand Warriors (P)	24	16	1	7	2	731	481	+250	37
3	Canterbury-Bankstown Bulldogs	24	15	2	7	2	773	596	+177	36
4	North Queensland Cowboys	24	14	3	7	2	673	540	+133	35
5	Sydney Roosters	24	14	1	9	2	695	588	+107	33
6	Canberra Raiders	24	14	1	9	2	764	734	+30	33
7	Manly Warringah Sea Eagles	24	13	0	11	2	568	583	-15	30
8	Gold Coast Titans	24	12	1	11	2	581	663	-82	29
9	Wests Tigers	24	12	0	12	2	620	532	+88	28
10	Brisbane Broncos	24	11	1	12	2	690	635	+55	27
11	St. George Illawarra Dragons	24	10	1	13	2	568	543	+25	25
12	Newcastle Knights	24	9	1	14	2	612	732	-120	23
13	Melbourne Storm	24	8	2	14	2	683	782	-99	22
14	Cronulla-Sutherland Sharks	24	8	1	15	2	492	634	-142	21
15	Penrith Panthers	24	8	0	16	2	643	838	-195	20
16	Parramatta Eels	24	3	1	20	2	454	786	-332	11
