= 2010 Penrith Panthers season =

- NRL rank: 2nd
- 2010 record: Wins: 15; draws: 0; losses: 9
- Points scored: For: 645; against: 489

Team information
- CEO: (Australia) Michael Leary
- Coach: Matthew Elliott
- Captain: (Australia) Petero Civoniceva
- Stadium: CUA Stadium
- Avg. attendance: 13,056

Top scorers
- Tries: Lachlan Coote (17)
- Goals: Michael Gordon (98)
- Points: Michael Gordon (252)
| ← 2009 | 2011 → |

The 2010 Penrith Panthers season was the 44th in the club's history. Coached by Matthew Elliott and captained by Petero Civoniceva, they competed in the National Rugby League's 2010 Telstra Premiership season.

== Milestones and achievements ==
- 13 March – Round One: Four players made their debuts for the Panthers; Adrian Purtell, Kevin Kingston, Nigel Plum and Travis Burns.
- 20 March – Round Two: Petero Civoniceva played his 250th NRL game.
- 27 March – Round Three: Sam McKendry scored his 1st NRL try.
- 16 May – Round Ten: Michael Jennings scored his 50th NRL try.
- 24 May – Round Eleven: Michael Gordon kicked his 200th NRL goal.
- 9 August – Round Twenty-two: Brad Tighe played his 100th NRL game.
- 20 August – Round Twenty-four: Kevin Kingston played his 100th NRL game.
- 20 August – Round Twenty-four: Petero Civoniceva played his 50th game for the Panthers.
- 20 August – Round Twenty-four: Michael Gordon set a new club record for points in a single game (3 tries, 9 goals, 30 points).
- 4 September – Round Twenty-six: Michael Gordon set a new club record for points in a season (14 tries, 98 goals, 252 points).
- 7 September: Luke Lewis named Dally M Lock of the Year.
- 18 September – Semi-final Two: Nathan Smith played his 100th NRL game.

== Jersey and Sponsors ==
Home jersey

In 2010 the Panthers jerseys were again made by ISC. They retained their predominantly black home jerseys from 2009, while revealing a new teal and white away strip. The new away strip was designed featuring performance technology and weighed less than half of the previous away design.

Sanyo were again the major sponsor of the Panthers in 2010. Titan Warehousing Solutions replaced ABCOE Distributors as the sleeve sponsor. HOSTPLUS secured the shorts sponsorship while Tony Ferguson retained the rights for the back of the jersey.

The Panthers once again participated in the heritage round, sporting a retro strip. This jersey featured a white V on a predominately brown background, paired with white shorts.

== Fixtures ==
The Panthers again used CUA Stadium as their home ground in 2010, their home ground since they entered the competition in 1967.

=== Pre-season ===
The main squad returned to training on 5 November 2009 to start preparing for the 2010 season. Players involved in the 2009 Four Nations and 2009 Pacific Cup returned to training later.

| Date | Round | Opponent | Venue | Score | Tries | Goals | Attendance | Report |
|---|---|---|---|---|---|---|---|---|
| 20 February | Trial 1 | Parramatta Eels | CUA Stadium, Penrith | 32–12 | Burns (2), Elford, Walsh, Gordon | Gordon (3/3), Burns (1/1) | 11,113 | |
| 27 February | Trial 2 | Newcastle Knights | Port Macquarie Regional Stadium, Port Macquarie | 41–16 | Jennings (3), Lewis (2), Burns, Elford | Gordon (6/6), Walsh (FG) (1/1) | 6,423 | |
Legend: Win Loss Draw

=== Regular season ===
| Date | Round | Opponent | Venue | Score | Tries | Goals | Attendance | Report |
|---|---|---|---|---|---|---|---|---|
| 13 March | Round 1 | Canberra Raiders | CUA Stadium, Penrith | 34–16 | Coote (2), Elford, Lewis, Kingston, Purtell | Gordon (5/6) | 11,133 | |
| 20 March | Round 2 | North Queensland Cowboys | Dairy Farmers Stadium, Townsville | 20–28 | Lewis (2), Walsh | Gordon (4/4) | 13,339 | |
| 27 March | Round 3 | Melbourne Storm | CUA Stadium, Penrith | 10–16 | McKendry, Coote | Gordon (1/2) | 11,024 | |
| 5 April | Round 4 | Newcastle Knights | EnergyAustralia Stadium, Newcastle | 34–30 | Coote, Jennings, McKendry, Lewis, Paulo, Purtell | Gordon (5/6) | 15,894 | |
| 11 April | Round 5 | Sydney Roosters | CUA Stadium, Penrith | 28–6 | Paulo, Jennings, Purtell, Coote, Gordon | Gordon (4/6) | 14,023 | |
| 18 April | Round 6 | New Zealand Warriors | Mt Smart Stadium, Auckland | 40–12 | Purtell (2), Kingston (2), Coote, Gordon, Burns | Gordon (6/8) | 14,620 | |
| 24 April | Round 7 | Wests Tigers | CUA Stadium, Penrith | 26–18 | Coote (2), Jennings, Gordon | Gordon (5/5) | 19,220 | |
| 1 May | Round 8 | Gold Coast Titans | Skilled Park, Gold Coast | 24–38 | Coote (3), Burns | Gordon (4/4) | 15,430 | |
| | Round 9 | Bye | | | | | | |
| 16 May | Round 10 | Cronulla-Sutherland Sharks | Toyota Stadium, Sydney | 34–14 | Jennings (3), Elford (2), Iosefa | Gordon (5/6) | 10,352 | |
| 24 May | Round 11 | Canterbury-Bankstown Bulldogs | CUA Stadium, Penrith | 31–16 | Gordon (3), Grant, Elford | Gordon (5/5), Walsh (FG) (1/1) | 11,278 | |
| 30 May | Round 12 | South Sydney Rabbitohs | ANZ Stadium, Sydney | 22–42 | Coote (2), Tighe, Cooper | Gordon (3/4) | 11,108 | |
| 5 June | Round 13 | Newcastle Knights | CUA Stadium, Penrith | 28–10 | Tighe (2), Cooper, Jennings, Coote | Gordon (4/5) | 10,969 | |
| | Round 14 | Bye | | | | | | |
| 18 June | Round 15 | Brisbane Broncos | Suncorp Stadium, Brisbane | 22–12 | Purtell, Coote, Lewis, Kingston | Gordon (3/5) | 42,233 | |
| 25 June | Round 16 | Manly-Warringah Sea Eagles | CUA Stadium, Penrith | 40–22 | Jennings (3), Tighe, Waterhouse, Gordon, Cooper | Gordon (6/8) | 14,978 | |
| 5 July | Round 17 | St. George-Illawarra Dragons | WIN Jubilee Oval, Kograh | 12–8 | Graham, Simmons | Coote (2/3) | 12,974 | |
| 11 July | Round 18 | New Zealand Warriors | CUA Stadium, Penrith | 6–12 | Coote | Gordon (1/1) | 9,983 | |
| 17 July | Round 19 | Parramatta Eels | CUA Stadium, Penrith | 28–34 | Tighe, Gordon, Coote, Jennings, Graham | Gordon (4/5) | 22,582 | |
| 24 July | Round 20 | Melbourne Storm | Rectangular Stadium, Melbourne | 10–18 | Purtell, Jennings | Gordon (1/2) | 11,212 | |
| 30 July | Round 21 | North Queensland Cowboys | CUA Stadium, Penrith | 24–16 | Gordon (2), Tighe, Kingston | Gordon (4/5) | 7,080 | |
| 9 August | Round 22 | Canberra Raiders | Canberra Stadium, Canberra | 26–30 | Kingston, Pritchard, McKendry, Tighe | Gordon (5/6) | 8,850 | |
| 15 August | Round 23 | Wests Tigers | Campbelltown Stadium, Campbelltown | 18–43 | Pritchard, Gordon, Jennings | Gordon (3/3) | 17,208 | |
| 20 August | Round 24 | South Sydney Rabbitohs | CUA Stadium, Penrith | 54–18 | Gordon (3), Burns (2), Earl (2), McKendry, Iosefa | Gordon (9/10) | 13,411 | |
| 30 August | Round 25 | Canterbury-Bankstown Bulldogs | ANZ Stadium, Sydney | 24–18 | Earl, Tighe, Waterhouse, Jennings | Gordon (4/4) | 13,794 | |
| 4 September | Round 26 | Cronulla-Sutherland Sharks | CUA Stadium, Penrith | 50–12 | Pritchard (3), Jennings (2), Tighe (2), Graham, Smith | Gordon (7/9) | 10,997 | |
Legend: Win Loss Draw Bye

=== Finals Series ===
| Date | Round | Opponent | Venue | Score | Tries | Goals | Attendance | Report |
|---|---|---|---|---|---|---|---|---|
| 11 September | Qualifying Final | Canberra Raiders | CUA Stadium, Penrith | 22–24 | Gordon (2), Earl (2) | Gordon (3/4) | 16,668 | |
| 18 September | Semi-final | Sydney Roosters | Sydney Football Stadium, Sydney | 12–34 | Purtell, Graham | Gordon (2/2) | 23,459 | 2011 Match Centre – NRL.com |
Legend: Win Loss Draw

== Ladder ==
2010 NRL season
| Pos. | Team | Pld | W | D | L | B | PF | PA | PD | Pts |
|---|---|---|---|---|---|---|---|---|---|---|
| 1 | St. George Illawarra Dragons (P) | 24 | 17 | 0 | 7 | 2 | 518 | 299 | +219 | 38 |
| 2 | Penrith Panthers | 24 | 15 | 0 | 9 | 2 | 645 | 489 | +156 | 34 |
| 3 | Wests Tigers | 24 | 15 | 0 | 9 | 2 | 537 | 503 | +34 | 34 |
| 4 | Gold Coast Titans | 24 | 15 | 0 | 9 | 2 | 520 | 498 | +22 | 34 |
| 5 | New Zealand Warriors | 24 | 14 | 0 | 10 | 2 | 539 | 486 | +53 | 32 |
| 6 | Sydney Roosters | 24 | 14 | 0 | 10 | 2 | 559 | 510 | +49 | 32 |
| 7 | Canberra Raiders | 24 | 13 | 0 | 11 | 2 | 499 | 493 | +6 | 30 |
| 8 | Manly Warringah Sea Eagles | 24 | 12 | 0 | 12 | 2 | 545 | 510 | +35 | 28 |
| 9 | South Sydney Rabbitohs | 24 | 11 | 0 | 13 | 2 | 584 | 567 | +17 | 26 |
| 10 | Brisbane Broncos | 24 | 11 | 0 | 13 | 2 | 508 | 535 | −27 | 26 |
| 11 | Newcastle Knights | 24 | 10 | 0 | 14 | 2 | 499 | 569 | −70 | 24 |
| 12 | Parramatta Eels | 24 | 10 | 0 | 14 | 2 | 413 | 491 | −78 | 24 |
| 13 | Canterbury-Bankstown Bulldogs | 24 | 9 | 0 | 15 | 2 | 494 | 539 | −45 | 22 |
| 14 | Cronulla-Sutherland Sharks | 24 | 7 | 0 | 17 | 2 | 354 | 609 | −255 | 18 |
| 15 | North Queensland Cowboys | 24 | 5 | 0 | 19 | 2 | 425 | 667 | −242 | 14 |
| 16 | Melbourne Storm | 24 | 14 | 0 | 10 | 2 | 489 | 363 | +126 | 0^{1} |

^{1} Melbourne were deducted eight premiership points and barred from receiving premiership points for the rest of the season due to gross long-term salary cap breaches.

== 2010 Player Statistics and Coaching Staff ==
| Nat | Name | Pos | App | T | G | FG | Pts |
|---|---|---|---|---|---|---|---|
| (Australia) | Matthew Bell | SR | 23 | 0 | 0 | 0 | 0 |
| (Australia) | Travis Burns | FE | 19 | 4 | 0 | 0 | 16 |
| (Australia) | Petero Civoniceva | PR | 18 | 0 | 0 | 0 | 0 |
| (Australia) | Gavin Cooper | SR | 16 | 3 | 0 | 0 | 12 |
| (Australia) | Lachlan Coote | FB | 19 | 17 | 2 | 0 | 72 |
| (Australia) | Sandor Earl | WG | 6 | 3 | 0 | 0 | 12 |
| (Australia) | Shane Elford | WG | 5 | 4 | 0 | 0 | 16 |
| (Australia) | Michael Gordon | WG | 23 | 14 | 98 | 0 | 252 |
| (Australia) | Wade Graham | FE | 11 | 3 | 0 | 0 | 12 |
| (Australia) | Tim Grant | PR | 17 | 1 | 0 | 0 | 4 |
| (Samoa) | Masada Iosefa | HK | 16 | 2 | 0 | 0 | 8 |
| (Australia) | Michael Jennings | CE | 23 | 16 | 0 | 0 | 64 |
| (Australia) | Kevin Kingston | HK | 24 | 6 | 0 | 0 | 24 |
| (Australia) | Daine Laurie | PR | 3 | 0 | 0 | 0 | 0 |
| (Australia) | Luke Lewis | LK | 19 | 5 | 0 | 0 | 20 |
| (New Zealand) | Sam McKendry | PR | 24 | 4 | 0 | 0 | 16 |
| (New Zealand) | Joseph Paulo | LK | 7 | 2 | 0 | 0 | 8 |
| (Australia) | Nigel Plum | SR | 4 | 0 | 0 | 0 | 0 |
| (New Zealand) | Frank Pritchard | SR | 19 | 5 | 0 | 0 | 20 |
| (New Zealand) | Frank Puletua | PR | 9 | 0 | 0 | 0 | 0 |
| (Australia) | Adrian Purtell | CE | 24 | 7 | 0 | 0 | 28 |
| (Australia) | David Simmons | WG | 1 | 1 | 0 | 0 | 4 |
| (Australia) | Nathan Smith | LK | 20 | 1 | 0 | 0 | 4 |
| (Australia) | Brad Tighe | CE | 19 | 10 | 0 | 0 | 40 |
| (Australia) | Luke Walsh | HB | 20 | 1 | 0 | 1 | 5 |
| (Australia) | Trent Waterhouse | SR | 19 | 2 | 0 | 0 | 8 |
| | Totals | | — | 111 | 100 | 1 | 645 |

- Panthers Group CEO: Glenn Matthews
- Rugby League CEO: Mick Leary
- Head Coach: Matthew Elliott
- Rugby League Marketing Manager: Shannon Donato
- Media Manager: Andrew Farrell
- Coaching, Development and Recruitment Manager: Jim Jones
- Stadium Operations Manager: Tamara Van Antwerpen

== Transfers ==
Gains

| Player | Previous club | Until End of | Notes |
|---|---|---|---|
| David Simmons | Cronulla-Sutherland Sharks | 2011 | |
| Daine Laurie | Wests Tigers | 2011 | |
| Nigel Plum | Canberra Raiders | 2010 | |
| Kevin Kingston | Parramatta Eels | 2010 | |
| Adrian Purtell | Canberra Raiders | 2011 | |
| Travis Burns | North Queensland Cowboys | 2011 | |
| Sandor Earl | Sydney Roosters | | (Windsor player) |

Losses

| Player | Club | Until End of | Notes |
|---|---|---|---|
| Adam Woolnough | Retired | N/A | |
| Paul Aiton | Cronulla-Sutherland Sharks | 2011 | |
| Geoff Daniela | Wests Tigers | 2011 | |
| Junior Tia-Kilifi | Canterbury-Bankstown Bulldogs | 2011 | |
| Keith Peters | Released | N/A | |
| Jarrod Sammut | Crusaders RL | 2012 | |
| Junior Moors | Wests Tigers | 2010 | |
| Joel Romelo | Canterbury-Bankstown Bulldogs | | |

== Rep Players ==
| Name | Team | App | T | G | FG | Pts |
|---|---|---|---|---|---|---|
| Petero Civoniceva | Queensland; Australia | 2; 1 | 0; 0 | 0; 0 | 0; 0 | 0; 0 |
| Lachlan Coote | City | 1 | 1 | 0 | 0 | 4 |
| Michael Gordon | New South Wales | 1 | 0 | 3 | 0 | 6 |
| Tim Grant | City | 1 | 0 | 0 | 0 | 0 |
| Michael Jennings | NRL All Stars; City; New South Wales | 1; 1; 0 | 1; 0; 0 | 0; 0; 0 | 0; 0; 0 | 4; 0; 0 |
| Luke Lewis | New South Wales; Australia | 2; 1 | 0; 0 | 0; 0 | 0; 0 | 0; 0 |
| Trent Waterhouse | City; New South Wales | 1; 2 | 0; 0 | 0; 0 | 0; 0 | 0; 0 |

== Other teams ==
In 2010 the Panthers again compete in the Toyota Cup while senior players who were not required for the first team play with the Windsor Wolves in the NSW Cup.

=== 2010 U20 Panthers ===
National Youth Competition season 2010
| | Team | Pld | W | D | L | B | PF | PA | PD | Pts |
|---|---|---|---|---|---|---|---|---|---|---|
| 1 | South Sydney Rabbitohs | 24 | 17 | 0 | 7 | 2 | 687 | 567 | +120 | 38 |
| 2 | New Zealand Warriors (P) | 24 | 16 | 1 | 7 | 2 | 731 | 481 | +250 | 37 |
| 3 | Canterbury-Bankstown Bulldogs | 24 | 15 | 2 | 7 | 2 | 773 | 596 | +177 | 36 |
| 4 | North Queensland Cowboys | 24 | 14 | 3 | 7 | 2 | 673 | 540 | +133 | 35 |
| 5 | Sydney Roosters | 24 | 14 | 1 | 9 | 2 | 695 | 588 | +107 | 33 |
| 6 | Canberra Raiders | 24 | 14 | 1 | 9 | 2 | 764 | 734 | +30 | 33 |
| 7 | Manly Warringah Sea Eagles | 24 | 13 | 0 | 11 | 2 | 568 | 583 | -15 | 30 |
| 8 | Gold Coast Titans | 24 | 12 | 1 | 11 | 2 | 581 | 663 | -82 | 29 |
| 9 | Wests Tigers | 24 | 12 | 0 | 12 | 2 | 620 | 532 | +88 | 28 |
| 10 | Brisbane Broncos | 24 | 11 | 1 | 12 | 2 | 690 | 635 | +55 | 27 |
| 11 | St. George Illawarra Dragons | 24 | 10 | 1 | 13 | 2 | 568 | 543 | +25 | 25 |
| 12 | Newcastle Knights | 24 | 9 | 1 | 14 | 2 | 612 | 732 | -120 | 23 |
| 13 | Melbourne Storm | 24 | 8 | 2 | 14 | 2 | 683 | 782 | -99 | 22 |
| 14 | Cronulla-Sutherland Sharks | 24 | 8 | 1 | 15 | 2 | 492 | 634 | -142 | 21 |
| 15 | Penrith Panthers | 24 | 8 | 0 | 16 | 2 | 643 | 838 | -195 | 20 |
| 16 | Parramatta Eels | 24 | 3 | 1 | 20 | 2 | 454 | 786 | -332 | 11 |

== Trivia ==
- Michael Gordon kicked 82% of his shots at goal in 2010. Gordon's 252 points in the regular season was the highest by any player since Hazem El Masri's 296-point haul in 2006.
- Penrith equalled the NRL's sixth biggest comeback, defeating the Knights in round 4 after trailing by 18 points at half time.
- In round 25, against the Bulldogs, Petero Civoniceva became the first player sent off for 2010.

Note: As of round 26, trials not included.
