= 2010 Wests Tigers season =

Wests Tigers
- 2010 season
- CEO: Stephen Humphreys
- Head coach: Tim Sheens
- Captain: Robbie Farah
- NRL: 3rd (Preliminary Final)
- Toyota Cup: 9th
- Top try scorer: Club: Lote Tuqiri (18)
- Top points scorer: Club: Benji Marshall (203)
- Highest home attendance: 30,685
- Lowest home attendance: 10,061
- Average home attendance: 18,086

The 2010 Wests Tigers season was the eleventh in the joint-venture club's history. They competed in the National Rugby League's 2010 Telstra Premiership, finishing the regular season 3rd (out of 16). The Tigers then came within one game of the grand final but were knocked out by eventual premiers, St. George Illawarra.

== Season summary ==
The Wests Tigers made headlines in the pre-season with the high-profile signing of former rugby league and rugby union international, Lote Tuqiri. Back-rower Liam Fulton returned from a season in the Super League and former Sydney Roosters prop forward Jason Cayless also joined the club after a four-year stay at St Helens R.F.C. Mark Flanagan joined the club from Super League side Wigan.

Robbie Farah, the team's hooker, retained his role as captain of the side for the second year.

With his first touch of the ball, new recruit Tuqiri scored the club's first try of 2010 in their round one win over the Manly-Warringah Sea Eagles at the Sydney Football Stadium. The Tigers had an exciting start to the season, winning the first four of five games to lead the competition with St George Illawarra, Melbourne Storm and the Gold Coast Titans.

Wests eventually finished the regular season in 3rd position; the highest in the club's history. This was also their first finals appearance since winning the 2005 Telstra Premiership five years earlier. They lost to eventual premiers St George Illawarra Dragons on 25 September 2010 by a score of 13-12 to miss out on the grand final.

Head Coach, Tim Sheens, extended his contract with the Wests Tigers to the end of the 2011 season.

=== Regular season ===
| Date | Round | Opponent | Venue | Result | Score | Tries | Goals | Attendance | Report |
|---|---|---|---|---|---|---|---|---|---|
| 15 March | Round 1 | Manly-Warringah Sea Eagles | Sydney Football Stadium, Sydney | Win | 26–22 | Ayshford, Ellis, Fulton, Lawrence, Tuqiri | Marshall (3) | 18,421 | |
| 21 March | Round 2 | Sydney Roosters | Sydney Football Stadium, Sydney | Loss | 32–44 | Marshall (2), Ayshford, Fifita, Schirnack, Tuqiri | Marshall (4) | 19,021 | |
| 26 March | Round 3 | Parramatta Eels | Sydney Football Stadium, Sydney | Win | 23–12 | Marshall (2), Tuqiri (2), Ayshford | Marshall (1) & (FG) | 21,318 | |
| 4 April | Round 4 | Canberra Raiders | Bruce Stadium, Canberra | Win | 35–22 | Fulton (2), Farah, Lawrence, Marshall, Ryan | Marshall (5), Farah (FG) | 17,112 | |
| 10 April | Round 5 | North Queensland Cowboys | Willows Sports Complex, Townsville | Win | 23–16 | Lawrence (2), Heighington, Tuqiri | Marshall (3), Farah (FG) | 16,273 | |
| 16 April | Round 6 | Canterbury-Bankstown Bulldogs | Sydney Football Stadium, Sydney | Loss | 4–24 | Tuqiri | - | 19,491 | |
| 24 April | Round 7 | Penrith Panthers | Penrith Park, Sydney | Loss | 18–26 | Flanagan, Heighington, Lawrence | Marshall (3) | 19,220 | |
| 2 May | Round 8 | Sydney Roosters | Sydney Football Stadium, Sydney | Loss | 8–12 | Heighington | Marshall (2) | 19,901 | |
| 16 May | Round 10 | South Sydney Rabbitohs | Sydney Cricket Ground, Sydney | Loss | 10–50 | Lawrence, Lui | Marshall (1) | 30,685 | |
| 21 May | Round 11 | Newcastle Knights | Newcastle International Sports Centre, Newcastle | Win | 23–6 | Daniela, Ellis, Lawrence, Marshall | Marshall (3), (FG) | 14,458 | |
| 28 May | Round 12 | New Zealand Warriors | Campbelltown Stadium, Sydney | Win | 50–6 | Daniela (3), Tuqiri (2), Farah, Flanagan, Lawrence, Ryan | Marshall (7) | 10,061 | |
| 4 June | Round 13 | Canterbury-Bankstown Bulldogs | Stadium Australia, Sydney | Win | 19–12 | Dwyer, Farah, Marshall, | Marshall (3), Lui (FG) | 11,837 | |
| 20 June | Round 15 | Canberra Raiders | Leichhardt Oval, Sydney | Win | 18–8 | Ryan (2), Fitzhenry | Marshall (3) | 19,428 | |
| 25 June | Round 16 | St George Illawarra Dragons | Kogarah Oval, Sydney | Loss | 10–34 | Lawrence, Tuqiri | Marshall (1) | 16,574 | |
| 2 July | Round 17 | Brisbane Broncos | Lang Park, Brisbane | Win | 16–14 | Brown, Lawrence, Marshall | Marshall (2) | 30,127 | |
| 9 July | Round 18 | Gold Coast Titans | Campbelltown Stadium, Sydney | Win | 15–14 | Ayshford, Brown | Marshall (3) & (FG) | 14,050 | |
| 19 July | Round 19 | North Queensland Cowboys | Leichhardt Oval, Sydney | Win | 26–16 | Tuqiri (2), Ayshford, Brown, Fulton, Marshall | Marshall (1) | 11,364 | |
| 25 July | Round 20 | Manly-Warringah Sea Eagles | Grahame Park, Gosford | Loss | 20–38 | Ayshford, Heighington, Lui, Tuqiri | Marshall (2) | 20,059 | |
| 31 July | Round 21 | Cronulla-Sutherland Sharks | Leichhardt Oval, Sydney | Win | 24–22 | Fulton (2), Brown, Lawrence, Tuqiri | Lawrence (1), Marshall (1) | 14,942 | |
| 7 August | Round 22 | South Sydney Rabbitohs | Stadium Australia, Sydney | Loss | 30–34 | Ayshford, Farah, Galloway, Lawrence, Tuqiri | Marshall (5) | 23,298 | |
| 15 August | Round 23 | Penrith Panthers | Campbelltown Stadium, Sydney | Win | 43–18 | Ellis (2), Fifita (2), Farah, Lawrence, Lui | Marshall (7), Farah (FG) | 17,208 | |
| 22 August | Round 24 | Parramatta Eels | Parramatta Stadium, Sydney | Win | 20–18 | Ryan (2), Fifita, Lawrence | Marshall (2) | 19,854 | |
| 29 August | Round 25 | Melbourne Storm | Leichhardt Oval, Sydney | Win | 26–14 | Marshall (3), Farah, Fifita | Marshall (3) | 20,168 | |
| 3 September | Round 26 | Gold Coast Titans | Robina Stadium, Gold Coast | Loss | 18–21 | Ellis, Heighington, Tuqiri | Marshall (3) | 26,103 | |

=== Finals Series ===
| Date | Round | Opponent | Venue | Result | Score | Tries | Goals | Attendance | Report |
|---|---|---|---|---|---|---|---|---|---|
| 11 September | Qualifying Final | Sydney Roosters | Sydney Football Stadium, Sydney | Loss | 15–19 | Ayshford, Ryan, Tuqiri | Marshall (1), Farah (FG) | 33,315 | |
| 17 September | Semi Final | Canberra Raiders | Bruce Stadium, Canberra | Win | 26–24 | Ellis, Heighington, Lawrence, Tuqiri | Marshall (5) | 26,476 | |
| 25 September | Preliminary Final | St George Illawarra Dragons | Stadium Australia, Sydney | Loss | 12–13 | Lui, Tuqiri | Marshall (2) | 71,212 | |

== Ladder ==
2010 NRL season
| Pos. | Team | Pld | W | D | L | B | PF | PA | PD | Pts |
|---|---|---|---|---|---|---|---|---|---|---|
| 1 | St. George Illawarra Dragons (P) | 24 | 17 | 0 | 7 | 2 | 518 | 299 | +219 | 38 |
| 2 | Penrith Panthers | 24 | 15 | 0 | 9 | 2 | 645 | 489 | +156 | 34 |
| 3 | Wests Tigers | 24 | 15 | 0 | 9 | 2 | 537 | 503 | +34 | 34 |
| 4 | Gold Coast Titans | 24 | 15 | 0 | 9 | 2 | 520 | 498 | +22 | 34 |
| 5 | New Zealand Warriors | 24 | 14 | 0 | 10 | 2 | 539 | 486 | +53 | 32 |
| 6 | Sydney Roosters | 24 | 14 | 0 | 10 | 2 | 559 | 510 | +49 | 32 |
| 7 | Canberra Raiders | 24 | 13 | 0 | 11 | 2 | 499 | 493 | +6 | 30 |
| 8 | Manly Warringah Sea Eagles | 24 | 12 | 0 | 12 | 2 | 545 | 510 | +35 | 28 |
| 9 | South Sydney Rabbitohs | 24 | 11 | 0 | 13 | 2 | 584 | 567 | +17 | 26 |
| 10 | Brisbane Broncos | 24 | 11 | 0 | 13 | 2 | 508 | 535 | −27 | 26 |
| 11 | Newcastle Knights | 24 | 10 | 0 | 14 | 2 | 499 | 569 | −70 | 24 |
| 12 | Parramatta Eels | 24 | 10 | 0 | 14 | 2 | 413 | 491 | −78 | 24 |
| 13 | Canterbury-Bankstown Bulldogs | 24 | 9 | 0 | 15 | 2 | 494 | 539 | −45 | 22 |
| 14 | Cronulla-Sutherland Sharks | 24 | 7 | 0 | 17 | 2 | 354 | 609 | −255 | 18 |
| 15 | North Queensland Cowboys | 24 | 5 | 0 | 19 | 2 | 425 | 667 | −242 | 14 |
| 16 | Melbourne Storm | 24 | 14 | 0 | 10 | 2 | 489 | 363 | +126 | 0^{1} |

^{1} Melbourne were deducted eight premiership points and barred from receiving premiership points for the rest of the season due to gross long-term salary cap breaches.

== Gains and losses ==
2010 Player Movements
| Gains | | Losses | |
| Player | Previous club | Player | New Club |
|---|---|---|---|
| Mark Flanagan | Wigan Warriors | Shannon Gallant | North Queensland Cowboys |
| Lote Tuqiri | Leicester Tigers | Dean Collis | Cronulla Sharks |
| Jason Cayless | St Helens R.F.C. | John Morris | Cronulla Sharks |
| Liam Fulton | Huddersfield Giants | Danny Galea | Canberra Raiders |
| Daniel Fitzhenry | Hull Kingston Rovers | Peni Tagive | St George Illawarra Dragons |
| Mitch Brown | Cronulla Sharks | Corey Payne | Canterbury Bulldogs |
| Arana Taumata | Melbourne Storm | Rhys Hanbury | Crusaders Rugby League |
| Junior Moors | Penrith Panthers | John Skandalis | (retired) |
| Geoff Daniela | Penrith Panthers | | |

== Squad ==
Wests Tigers 2010 Squad
| Nu Akeripa (Centre, Second-row); Blake Ayshford (Five-eighth, Centre); Mitch Brown (Fullback, Centre, Wing); Jason Cayless (Prop, Second-row); Chris Corby (Hooker); Josh Davis (Centre); Geoff Daniela (Centre, Wing); Simon Dwyer (Second-row); Gareth Ellis (Second-row); Robbie Farah (c) (Hooker); Andrew Fifita (Prop); David Fifita (Second-row); Daniel Fitzhenry (Wing) | Mark Flanagan (Five-eighth, Lock); Liam Fulton (Lock, Five-eighth); Keith Galloway (Prop); Bryce Gibbs (Prop); Chris Heighington (Second-row); Matt Hyland (Lock); Sam Latu (Wing); Chris Lawrence (Centre); Blake Lazarus (Fullback, Halfback); Robert Lui (Halfback, Five-eighth); Wade McKinnon (Fullback}; Benji Marshall (Halfback, Five-eighth); Willie Mataka (Second-row); Tim Moltzen (Fullback, Five-eighth, Halfback) | Junior Moors (Lock, Second-row); Todd Payten (Prop); Rhys Pritchard (Centre); Junior Roqica (Wing); Beau Ryan (Wing); Alan Schirnack (Prop, Second-row); Jason Schirnack (Second-row); Taniela Tuiaki (Wing); Tame Tupou (Wing); Lote Tuqiri; Aaron Woods (Prop); Sean Meaney (Fullback) | Coaches: Tim Sheens Head Coach; Royce Simmons Assistant Coach; Peter Gentle Assistant Coach; Steve Folkes Conditioning and Fitness; Updated: 26 April 2010; Source: Wests Tigers Official Website |
