= 2010 NRL season =

103rd season of National Rugby League

2010 National Rugby League
- Teams: 16
- Premiers: St. George Illawarra Dragons (1st title)
- Minor premiers: St. George Illawarra Dragons (2nd title)
- Matches played: 201
- Average attendance: 17,373
- Total attendance: 3,491,890
- Top points scorer: Michael Gordon (270)
- Wooden spoon: Melbourne Storm (1st spoon)
- Dally M Medal: Todd Carney
- Top try-scorer(s): Akuila Uate (21); Shaun Kenny-Dowall (21)

The 2010 NRL season was the 103rd season of professional rugby league football club competition in Australia, and the thirteenth run by the National Rugby League (NRL). The season commenced on 12 March and ended with the grand final, played on 3 October at ANZ Stadium. Sixteen teams competed for the 2010 Telstra Premiership whilst the third season of the National Youth Competition was also in progress.

The 2010 season was marred by the Melbourne Storm's admission in April of systematically breaching the NRL salary cap. As part of the NRL's imposed penalties, the Storm were deducted all 8 competition points earned at the time of the announcement, and were barred from earning points for the rest of the season, guaranteeing them the wooden spoon. The club was also stripped of all titles earned during the period they were in breach, including their 2007 and 2009 premierships and their 2006, 2007 and 2008 minor premierships, and later also their 2010 World Club Challenge title.

2010's NRL premiership was won by the season's minor premiers the St. George Illawarra Dragons, the first title for the joint venture club. The Dragons became the first minor premiers since the Penrith Panthers in 2003 to complete the minor premiership and premiership double.

== Season summary ==
During the pre-season the Melbourne Storm defeated the Leeds Rhinos 18–10 in the 2010 World Club Challenge. The inaugural All Stars match took place on 13 February at Skilled Park, Gold Coast, where the Indigenous All Stars team won 16–12.

Significant dates throughout the season include the annual Anzac Test and City vs Country Origin weekend, resulting in a shortened round in early May. Byes take place throughout the State of Origin period between Rounds 11 and 18 (during June and July). The annual heritage round takes place again in Round 10, a round celebrating Women in League has been earmarked for Round 16, and later in the season a round has been set aside to celebrate Indigenous Australians.

For the second successive year the St. George Illawarra Dragons took out the JJ Giltinan Shield for winning the minor premiership.

The overall attendance record during the regular season was 3,151,039, an increase on last year's record of 3,081,874. This was the second consecutive year that the rugby league attendance record has been broken.

On 7 September 2010, Sydney Roosters' five-eighth Todd Carney won the Dally M Medal for Player of the Year for season 2010 and was also awarded the people's choice Provan-Summons award (see 2010 Dally M Awards for full award listing).

In 2010, NRL games on New Zealand's Sky network drew average audiences of 60,779.

=== Rule changes ===
During the 2010 season, a rule change to the playing field was implemented so that if a player in possession of the ball made contact with the corner post that player would no longer be considered to be touch in-goal. Proponents of the move argued a series of possible future scenarios made this preventative measure necessary, with ARL chief executive Geoff Carr stating, "no one has thought of the possibility of using the corner post as a weapon to defuse a try and we want to stop it before they do". One scenario was that a defending player might manipulate the corner post to put an attacker out of play. Another concern cited was that the corner post might be made to make contact with a rolling ball to ensure the defending team gains possession with a 20-metre restart. Corner posts, which sometimes lean to one side, have no upper height limit set and this led to a fear that corner posts might become "long rubber snakes, biting attackers and sending them into touch", in the words of Roy Masters. Other laws concerning the corner posts remained unchanged. A ball that makes contact with the corner post while not in the possession of a player will be deemed to be touch in-goal as before. There was no attempt to remove the corner posts from the playing field as they are used to promote sponsors and are also a useful aid for players to judge their kicks. The change was agreed by the NRL Board and approved by the RLIF as an experimental rule. Implementation occurred mid-season following feedback from clubs.

=== Melbourne Storm salary cap breach ===
On 22 April, Melbourne Storm officials confessed to the NRL that the club had committed serious and systematic breaches of the salary cap regulations for the last five years by running a well-organized dual contract and bookkeeping system which left the NRL unable to know of $3.17 million in payments made to players outside of the salary cap, including $550,000 in 2007, $965,000 in 2009 and $1.03 million in 2010.

As a result of this confession, the following penalties were imposed by the NRL:

- The Storm were stripped of their 2007 and 2009 premierships and their 2006–2008 minor premierships; these titles will be withheld, rather than be awarded to the respective grand finalists (Manly & Parramatta) and runners-up. The Storm however were allowed to keep the 2010 World Club Challenge title that they won two months earlier, until this was stripped thirteen months later.
- The Storm were fined a record $1.689 million: $1.1 million in prize money which will be distributed equally between the remaining 15 clubs, $89,000 in prize money from the World Club Challenge which will be distributed to the Leeds Rhinos, and the maximum of $500,000 for breaching the salary cap regulations.
- The Storm were ordered to cut their payroll by $1,012,500 by 31 December; failure to do so would have resulted in the club being suspended from the 2011 season.
- The Storm were deducted all eight competition points received during the 2010 season and barred from receiving premiership points for the remainder of the season.

The Storm accepted this decision without question; however, the former directors of the club took legal action which later collapsed. The matter has been referred to ASIC, Australian Tax Office, the Victorian State Revenue Office, and the Victoria Police.

Melbourne eventually finished the 2010 season with a 14–10 win–loss record, which would have seen them finish 5th disregarding the punishments, with Manly missing the finals. Statistically, the North Queensland Cowboys were the poorest performing team during the season, winning only five of its 24 matches played which, disregarding the Storm's punishment, would have been their first wooden spoon since 2000.

== Season advertising ==
A new approach was taken in 2010 following the controversies of 2009 wherein marquee players Greg Inglis (who had featured in the season launch ad) and Brett Stewart (who had been the face of a season launch event) were charged with assault thus disempowering the message behind the ad. The NRL and their advertising agency MJW Hakuhodo set about presenting the acceptable face of the Australian rugby league to the world and interspersed some sparse action shots with a gallery of characters to assure viewers that league is a family-friendly sport watched by everyman.

For the first time in years, the launch commercial did not use a popular soundtrack. Titled the "Voices of the Game," the ad showed the diversity of the rugby league's appeal and featured fans from all walks of life: a rodeo clown, a sculptor, a farmer, a businessman and Australian Paralympian Kurt Fearnley. The proposition was that "this season, many of you will....see/ feel/ experience/ dream/ hurt/ believe". The fans highlighted represented a diverse but wholesome audience demographic. Veteran Kangaroo captain Darren Lockyer is the only player to appear with a speaking part.

== Teams ==
The number of teams in the NRL remains unchanged since the previous season, with sixteen participating in the regular season: ten from New South Wales, three from Queensland and one from each of Victoria, the Australian Capital Territory and New Zealand. Of the ten from New South Wales, eight are from Sydney's metropolitan area, with St. George-Illawarra being a Sydney and Wollongong joint venture. Just two foundation clubs from New South Wales Rugby League season 1908 played in this competition: the Sydney Roosters (formerly known as Eastern Suburbs) and the South Sydney Rabbitohs.

Brisbane Broncos; 23rd season Ground: Suncorp Stadium; Coach: Ivan Henjak; Captain: Darren Lockyer	Canterbury-Bankstown Bulldogs; 76th season Ground: ANZ Stadium; Coach: Kevin Moore; Captain: Andrew Ryan	Canberra Raiders; 29th season Ground: Canberra Stadium; Coach: David Furner; Captain: Alan Tongue & Terry Campese	Cronulla-Sutherland Sharks; 44th season Ground: Toyota Stadium; Coach: Ricky Stuart → Shane Flanagan; Captain: Trent Barrett
Gold Coast Titans; 4th season Ground: Skilled Park; Coach: John Cartwright; Captain: Scott Prince	Manly Warringah Sea Eagles; 61st season Ground: Brookvale Oval; Coach: Des Hasler; Captain: Jamie Lyon & Jason King	Melbourne Storm; 13th season Ground: Etihad Stadium → AAMI Park; Coach: Craig Bellamy; Captain: Cameron Smith	Newcastle Knights; 23rd season Ground: EnergyAustralia Stadium; Coach: Rick Stone; Captain: Kurt Gidley
2009 New Zealand Warriors; 16th season Ground: Mt. Smart Stadium; Coach: Ivan Cleary; Captain: Simon Mannering	North Queensland Cowboys; 16th season Ground: Dairy Farmers Stadium; Coach: Neil Henry; Captain: Johnathan Thurston	Parramatta Eels; 64th season Ground: Parramatta Stadium; Coach: Daniel Anderson; Captain: Nathan Cayless & Nathan Hindmarsh	Penrith Panthers; 44th season Ground: CUA Stadium; Coach: Matthew Elliott; Captain: Petero Civoniceva
South Sydney Rabbitohs; 101st season Ground: ANZ Stadium; Coach: John Lang; Captain: Roy Asotasi	Sydney Roosters; 103rd season Ground: Sydney Football Stadium; Coach: Brian Smith; Captain: Braith Anasta	St. George Illawarra Dragons; 12th season Ground: Jubilee Oval & Wollongong Showground; Coach: Wayne Bennett; Captain: Ben Hornby	Wests Tigers; 11th season Grounds: Campbelltown Stadium & Leichhardt Oval; Coach: Tim Sheens; Captain: Robbie Farah

== Regular season ==
Team	1	2	3	4	5	6	7	8	9	10	11	12	13	14	15	16	17	18	19	20	21	22	23	24	25	26	F1	F2	F3	GF
Brisbane Broncos	**NQL** **+6**	CAN −8	**NZL** **−32**	SYD −19	SGI −18	**CRO** **+28**	CBY −18	**NEW** **−8**	MEL +22	**GCT** **+22**	X	CRO +16	MAN +16	**SOU** **+28**	**PEN** **−10**	PAR +4	**WTI** **−2**	X	GCT +14	**SYD** **−4**	**SGI** **+4**	NQL +8	**PAR** **−16**	NEW −26	NZL −32	**CAN** **−2**				
Canberra Raiders	PEN −18	**BRI** **+8**	GCT −20	**WTI** **−13**	PAR +10	SYD −30	**SOU** **−2**	NZL +7	X	**MEL** **−11**	SGI +8	X	**GCT** **+4**	NQL −8	WTI −10	**CBY** **−8**	**SYD** **−10**	MAN +2	**NEW** **+34**	**CRO** **+7**	MEL −24	**PEN** **+4**	CBY +14	**SGI** **+16**	**NQL** **+44**	BRI +2	PEN +2	**WTI** **−2**		
Canterbury-Bankstown Bulldogs	**NEW** **−4**	SGI −20	**SYD** **+46**	**SOU** **−22**	**NZL** **−6**	WTI +20	**BRI** **+18**	**PAR** **−16**	X	**SGI** **−13**	PEN −15	MEL −11	**WTI** **−7**	X	GCT −1	CAN +8	CRO +12	**MEL** **+2**	SYD −4	**PAR** **−16**	**SOU** **+20**	NEW −24	**CAN** **−14**	NQL +2	**PEN** **−6**	MAN +6				
Cronulla-Sutherland Sharks	**MEL** **−4**	NZL −14	**SOU** **−22**	**PAR** **+11**	MAN −28	BRI −28	**NEW** **+20**	SGI −38	X	**PEN** **−20**	PAR +4	**BRI** **−16**	SYD +24	X	**SGI** **−18**	NQL +1*	**CBY** **−12**	NEW −11	**MAN** **−30**	CAN −7	WTI −2	**NZL** **−27**	**SYD** **+6**	MEL −20	**GCT** **+14**	PEN −38				
Gold Coast Titans	**NZL** **+6**	SOU +1*	**CAN** **+20**	NQL −14	**MEL** **+4**	**SGI** **−13**	MAN +2	**PEN** **+14**	NEW +2	BRI −22	X	**SYD** **−14**	CAN −4	**MAN** **+14**	**CBY** **+1**	**NEW** **−8**	X	WTI −1	**BRI** **−14**	SGI +1*	NZL +8	**PAR** **+22**	**NQL** **+19**	SYD +9	CRO −14	**WTI** **+3**	**NZL** **+12**	X	**SYD** **−26**	
Manly Warringah Sea Eagles	WTI −4	PAR −4	**NEW** **+24**	NZL +8	**CRO** **+28**	MEL +2	**GCT** **−2**	SOU +8	**SGI** **+18**	**PAR** **−7**	X	NQL +4	**BRI** **−16**	GCT −14	**SOU** **+1**	PEN −18	X	**CAN** **−2**	CRO +30	**WTI** **+18**	NEW −18	**MEL** **+20**	SGI −22	**NZL** **+3**	SYD −16	**CBY** **−6**	SGI −28			
Melbourne Storm	CRO +4	NEW +6	PEN +6	**SGI** **+13**	GCT −4	**MAN** **−2**	**NZL** **+34**	NQL +28	**BRI** **−22**	CAN +11	X	**CBY** **+11**	PAR −14	**SYD** **−32**	**NQL** **+46**	SOU −2	X	CBY −2	NZL −7	**PEN** **+8**	**CAN** **+24**	MAN −20	**SOU** **+2**	**CRO** **+20**	WTI −12	**NEW** **+30**				
Newcastle Knights	CBY +4	**MEL** **−6**	MAN −24	**PEN** **−4**	**SOU** **−18**	**NQL** **+18**	CRO −20	BRI +8	**GCT** **−2**	**SYD** **+16**	**WTI** **−17**	X	PEN −18	**NZL** **−8**	**PAR** **+2**	GCT +8	X	**CRO** **+11**	CAN −34	NQL −4*	**MAN** **+18**	**CBY** **+24**	NZL −12	**BRI** **+26**	**SGI** **−8**	MEL −30				
New Zealand Warriors	GCT −6	**CRO** **+14**	BRI +32	**MAN** **−8**	CBY +6	**PEN** **−28**	MEL −34	**CAN** **−7**	X	**NQL** **+12**	**SOU** **+2**	WTI −44	**SGI** **−2**	NEW +8	X	**SYD** **+2**	**PAR** **+29**	PEN +6	**MEL** **+7**	SOU −10	**GCT** **−8**	CRO +27	**NEW** **+12**	MAN −3	**BRI** **+32**	PAR +14	GCT −12			
North Queensland Cowboys	BRI −6	**PEN** **+8**	SGI −25	**GCT** **+14**	**WTI** **−7**	NEW −18	**PAR** **−6**	**MEL** **−28**	SYD +18	NZL −12	X	**MAN** **−4**	SOU −28	**CAN** **+8**	MEL −46	**CRO** **−1***	X	PAR −12	WTI −10	**NEW** **+4***	PEN −8	**BRI** **−8**	GCT −19	**CBY** **−2**	CAN −44	**SYD** **−10**				
Parramatta Eels	**SGI** **−6**	**MAN** **+4**	WTI −11	CRO −11	**CAN** **−10**	SOU +14	NQL +6	CBY +16	X	MAN +7	**CRO** **−4**	SGI −30	**MEL** **+14**	X	NEW −2	**BRI** **−4**	NZL −29	**NQL** **+12**	PEN +6	CBY +16	**SYD** **−36**	GCT −22	BRI +16	**WTI** **−2**	SOU −8	**NZL** **−14**				
Penrith Panthers	**CAN** **+18**	NQL −8	**MEL** **−6**	NEW +4	**SYD** **+22**	NZL +28	**WTI** **+8**	GCT −14	X	CRO +20	**CBY** **+15**	SOU −20	**NEW** **+18**	X	BRI +10	**MAN** **+18**	SGI +4	**NZL** **−6**	**PAR** **−6**	MEL −8	**NQL** **+8**	CAN −4	WTI −25	**SOU** **+36**	CBY +6	**CRO** **+38**	**CAN** **−2**	SYD −22		
South Sydney Rabbitohs	**SYD** **−26**	**GCT** **−1***	CRO +22	CBY +22	NEW +18	**PAR** **−14**	CAN +2	**MAN** **−8**	X	**WTI** **+40**	NZL −2	**PEN** **+20**	**NQL** **+28**	BRI −28	MAN −1	**MEL** **+2**	X	SYD −4	**SGI** **−3**	**NZL** **+10**	CBY −20	**WTI** **+4***	MEL −2	PEN −36	**PAR** **+8**	SGI −14				
St. George Illawarra Dragons	PAR +6	**CBY** **+20**	**NQL** **+25**	MEL −13	**BRI** **+18**	GCT +13	SYD +22	**CRO** **+38**	MAN −18	CBY +13	**CAN** **−8**	**PAR** **+30**	NZL +2	X	CRO +18	**WTI** **+24**	**PEN** **−4**	X	SOU +3	**GCT** **−1***	BRI −4	SYD +7	**MAN** **+22**	CAN −16	NEW +8	**SOU** **+14**	**MAN** **+28**	X	**WTI** **+1**	**SYD** **+24**
Sydney Roosters	SOU +26	**WTI** **+12**	CBY −46	**BRI** **+19**	PEN −22	**CAN** **+30**	**SGI** **−22**	WTI +4	**NQL** **−18**	NEW −16	X	GCT +14	**CRO** **−24**	MEL +32	X	NZL −2	CAN +10	**SOU** **+4**	**CBY** **+4**	BRI +4	PAR +36	**SGI** **−7**	CRO −6	**GCT** **−9**	**MAN** **+16**	NQL +10	**WTI** **+4***	**PEN** **+22**	GCT +26	SGI −24
Wests Tigers	**MAN** **+4**	SYD −12	**PAR** **+11**	CAN +13	NQL +7	**CBY** **−20**	PEN −8	**SYD** **−4**	X	SOU −40	NEW +17	**NZL** **+44**	CBY +7	X	**CAN** **+10**	SGI −24	BRI +2	**GCT** **+1**	**NQL** **+10**	MAN −18	**CRO** **+2**	SOU −4*	**PEN** **+25**	PAR +2	**MEL** **+12**	GCT −3	SYD −4*	CAN +2	SGI −1	
Team	1	2	3	4	5	6	7	8	9	10	11	12	13	14	15	16	17	18	19	20	21	22	23	24	25	26	F1	F2	F3	GF

Bold – Home game
X – Bye
* – Golden point game
Opponent for round listed above margin

== Ladder ==
2010 NRL season
Pos.	Team	Pld	W	D	L	B	PF	PA	PD	Pts
1	St. George Illawarra Dragons (P)	24	17	0	7	2	518	299	+219	38
2	Penrith Panthers	24	15	0	9	2	645	489	+156	34
3	Wests Tigers	24	15	0	9	2	537	503	+34	34
4	Gold Coast Titans	24	15	0	9	2	520	498	+22	34
5	New Zealand Warriors	24	14	0	10	2	539	486	+53	32
6	Sydney Roosters	24	14	0	10	2	559	510	+49	32
7	Canberra Raiders	24	13	0	11	2	499	493	+6	30
8	Manly Warringah Sea Eagles	24	12	0	12	2	545	510	+35	28
9	South Sydney Rabbitohs	24	11	0	13	2	584	567	+17	26
10	Brisbane Broncos	24	11	0	13	2	508	535	−27	26
11	Newcastle Knights	24	10	0	14	2	499	569	−70	24
12	Parramatta Eels	24	10	0	14	2	413	491	−78	24
13	Canterbury-Bankstown Bulldogs	24	9	0	15	2	494	539	−45	22
14	Cronulla-Sutherland Sharks	24	7	0	17	2	354	609	−255	18
15	North Queensland Cowboys	24	5	0	19	2	425	667	−242	14
16	Melbourne Storm	24	14	0	10	2	489	363	+126	0^{1}

^{1} Melbourne were deducted eight premiership points and barred from receiving premiership points for the rest of the season due to gross long-term salary cap breaches.

=== Ladder progression ===
- Numbers highlighted in green indicate that the team finished the round inside the top 8.
- Numbers highlighted in blue indicates the team finished first on the ladder in that round.
- Numbers highlighted in red indicates the team finished last place on the ladder in that round.
- Underlined numbers indicate that the team had a bye during that round.

	Team	1	2	3	4	5	6	7	8	9	10	11	12	13	14	15	16	17	18	19	20	21	22	23	24	25	26
1	St. George Illawarra	2	4	6	6	8	10	12	14	14	16	16	18	20	22	24	26	26	28	30	30	30	32	34	34	36	38
2	Penrith	2	2	2	4	6	8	10	10	12	14	16	16	18	20	22	24	26	26	26	26	28	28	28	30	32	34
3	Wests	2	2	4	6	8	8	8	8	10	10	12	14	16	18	20	20	22	24	26	26	28	28	30	32	34	34
4	Gold Coast	2	4	6	6	8	8	10	12	14	14	16	16	16	18	20	20	22	22	22	24	26	28	30	32	32	34
5	New Zealand	0	2	4	4	6	6	6	6	8	10	12	12	12	14	16	18	20	22	24	24	24	26	28	28	30	32
6	Sydney	2	4	4	6	6	8	8	10	10	10	12	14	14	16	18	18	20	22	24	26	28	28	28	28	30	32
7	Canberra	0	2	2	2	4	4	4	6	8	8	10	12	14	14	14	14	14	16	18	20	20	22	24	26	28	30
8	Manly Warringah	0	0	2	4	6	8	8	10	12	12	14	16	16	16	18	18	20	20	22	24	24	26	26	28	28	28
9	South Sydney	0	0	2	4	6	6	8	8	10	12	12	14	16	16	16	18	20	20	20	22	22	24	24	24	26	26
10	Brisbane	2	2	2	2	2	4	4	4	6	8	10	12	14	16	16	18	18	20	22	22	24	26	26	26	26	26
11	Newcastle	2	2	2	2	2	4	4	6	6	8	8	10	10	10	12	14	16	18	18	18	20	22	22	24	24	24
12	Parramatta	0	2	2	2	2	4	6	8	10	12	12	12	14	16	16	16	16	18	20	22	22	22	24	24	24	24
13	Canterbury-Bankstown	0	0	2	2	2	4	6	6	8	8	8	8	8	10	10	12	14	16	16	16	18	18	18	20	20	22
14	Cronulla-Sutherland	0	0	0	2	2	2	4	4	6	6	8	8	10	12	12	14	14	14	14	14	14	14	16	16	18	18
15	North Queensland	0	2	2	4	4	4	4	4	6	6	8	8	8	10	10	10	12	12	12	14	14	14	14	14	14	14
16	Melbourne	2	4	6	8	8	8	0	0	0	0	0	0	0	0	0	0	0	0	0	0	0	0	0	0	0	0

== Finals Series ==
To decide the grand finalists from the top eight finishing teams, the NRL adopts the McIntyre final eight system.

Only three teams from 2009's finals series made an appearance in the 2010 finals race: St. George Illawarra Dragons, Gold Coast Titans and Manly Warringah Sea Eagles, with only the Dragons managing to not drop positions from last year. Major improvements saw the Canberra Raiders, New Zealand Warriors and Sydney Roosters make a return to the finals after finishing 13th, 14th and last in 2009. This season also saw the Wests Tigers and Penrith Panthers make their long-awaited return to the finals race, with the Tigers last featuring in their grand final year of 2005 whilst the Panthers last appeared in the 2004 season. This was one of the 3 seasons where Melbourne were not in the finals and currently the last where they've missed the finals and it was also the first since 1991 which did not feature Brisbane.

Home	Score	Away	Match information
Home	Score	Away	Date and Time	Venue	Referees	Crowd
QUALIFYING FINALS
Gold Coast Titans	28–16	New Zealand Warriors	10 September, 7:45pm	Skilled Park	Gavin Badger; Tony Archer	27,026
Wests Tigers	15–19	Sydney Roosters †	11 September, 6:30pm	Sydney Football Stadium	Shayne Hayne; Matt Cecchen	33,315
Penrith Panthers	22–24	Canberra Raiders	11 September, 8:30pm	CUA Stadium	Ben Cummins; Steve Lyons	16,668
St. George Illawarra Dragons	28–0	Manly Warringah Sea Eagles	12 September, 4:00pm	WIN Jubilee Oval	Jarred Maxwell; Jason Robinson	15,574
SEMI FINALS
Canberra Raiders	24–26	Wests Tigers	17 September, 7:45pm	Canberra Stadium	Tony Archer; Jared Maxwell	26,476
Sydney Roosters	34–12	Penrith Panthers	18 September, 7:35pm	Sydney Football Stadium	Shayne Hayne; Ben Cummins	23,459
PRELIMINARY FINALS
Gold Coast Titans	6–32	Sydney Roosters	24 September, 7:45pm	Suncorp Stadium	Tony Archer; Jared Maxwell	44,787
St. George Illawarra Dragons	13–12	Wests Tigers	25 September, 7:45pm	ANZ Stadium	Ben Cummins; Shayne Hayne	71,212

† Match decided in golden point extra time.

Qualifying finals
1	St. George Illawarra	28
8	Manly	0
2	Penrith	22
7	Canberra	24
3	Wests	15
6	Sydney	19
4	Gold Coast	28
5	New Zealand	16

Semifinals
4W	Canberra	24
2L	Wests	26
3W	Sydney	34
1L	Penrith	12

Preliminary finals
1W	St. George Illawarra	13
Wests	12
2W	Gold Coast	6
Sydney	32

Final
St. George Illawarra	32
Sydney	8

== Grand Final ==
Sunday, 3 October
5:15pm (AEDT)

St. George Illawarra Dragons	32–8	Sydney Roosters
Tries: Jason Nightingale (46', 60') 2 Mark Gasnier (7') 1 Dean Young (63') 1 Nathan Fien (70') 1 Goals: Jamie Soward 6/7 (8', 48', 61', 64', 67' pen, 72')	1st: 6 – 8; 2nd: 26 – 0 Report	Tries: Braith Anasta (16') 1 Mitchell Aubusson (20') 1 Goals: Todd Carney 0/2

ANZ Stadium
Attendance: 82,334
Clive Churchill Medal: Darius Boyd
Referee: Tony Archer, Shayne Hayne

== Team and player records ==
The following statistics are correct as of the conclusion of Round 26.

Top 5 point scorers

Points	Player	Tries	Goals	Field Goals
252	Michael Gordon	14	98	0
223	Todd Carney	15	81	1
187	Benji Marshall	12	68	3
184	James Maloney	10	71	2
182	Jamie Lyon	11	69	0

Top 5 try scorers

Tries	Player
21	Akuila Uate
20	Israel Folau
20	Shaun Kenny-Dowall
20	Brett Morris
19	Manu Vatuvei

Top 5 goal scorers

Goals	Player
98	Michael Gordon
81	Todd Carney
73	Bryson Goodwin
71	James Maloney
70	Jamie Soward

Most points in a match by an individual

Points	Player	Tries	Goals	FG	Opponent	Score	Venue	Round
30	Michael Gordon	3	9/10	0	South Sydney Rabbitohs	54–18	CUA Stadium	Round 24
28	James Maloney	3	8/9	0	Brisbane Broncos	16–48	Suncorp Stadium	Round 3
22	Michael Gordon	3	5/5	0	Canterbury Bulldogs	31–16	CUA Stadium	Round 11
22	Jamie Lyon	2	7/7	0	Wests Tigers	38–20	Bluetongue Stadium	Round 20

Most tries in a match by an individual

Tries	Player	Opponent	Score	Venue	Round
4	Shaun Kenny-Dowall	Brisbane Broncos	34–30	Suncorp Stadium	Round 20
4	Josh Morris	Sydney Roosters	60–14	ANZ Stadium	Round 3
4	Reece Robinson	North Queensland Cowboys	48–4	Canberra Stadium	Round 25
4	Cooper Vuna	Brisbane Broncos	44–18	EnergyAustralia Stadium	Round 24

Most points in a match

Points	Victor	Opponent	Score	Venue	Round
76	Sydney Roosters	Wests Tigers	44–32	Sydney Football Stadium	Round 2
74	Canterbury Bulldogs	Sydney Roosters	60–14	ANZ Stadium	Round 3
74	Gold Coast Titans	Newcastle Knights	38–36	EnergyAustralia Stadium	Round 9
72	Brisbane Broncos	South Sydney Rabbitohs	50–22	Suncorp Stadium	Round 14
72	Penrith Panthers	South Sydney Rabbitohs	54–18	CUA Stadium	Round 24

Fewest points in a match

Points	Victor	Opponent	Score	Venue	Round
10	Newcastle Knights	Parramatta Eels	6–4	EnergyAustralia Stadium	Round 15
11	Cronulla Sharks	Parramatta Eels	11–0	Toyota Park	Round 4
16	Brisbane Broncos	Parramatta Eels	10–6	Parramatta Stadium	Round 16
16	Brisbane Broncos	St. George Illawarra Dragons	10–6	Suncorp Stadium	Round 21

Most points scored in a match by an individual team

Points	Team	Opponent	Score	Venue	Round
60	Canterbury Bulldogs	Sydney Roosters	60–14	ANZ Stadium	Round 3
58	Melbourne Storm	North Queensland Cowboys	58–12	AAMI Park	Round 15
54	Penrith Panthers	South Sydney Rabbitohs	54–18	CUA Stadium	Round 24
52	Canberra Raiders	Newcastle Knights	52–18	Canberra Stadium	Round 19

Paul Gallen ran 4,056 metres with the ball in 2010, more than any other player in the competition.

== Attendances ==
The 2010 regular season attendance figures bettered last year's figures of 3,081,849 to become the highest attended regular season in Australia's rugby league history, with a total of 3,151,039. Along with 2009, the 2010 season also outshone other attendance blockbuster years of 2007 and the 1995 Winfield Cup.

The highest twenty regular season match attendances:

Crowd	Venue	Home Team	Opponent	Round
48,516	Suncorp Stadium	Brisbane Broncos	North Queensland Cowboys	Round 1
42,269	Suncorp Stadium	Brisbane Broncos	St. George Illawarra Dragons	Round 21
42,233	Suncorp Stadium (Double header)	Brisbane Broncos; Gold Coast Titans	Penrith Panthers; Canterbury-Bankstown Bulldogs	Round 15
40,168	Suncorp Stadium	Brisbane Broncos	Gold Coast Titans	Round 10
38,872	Suncorp Stadium	Brisbane Broncos	Canberra Raiders	Round 26
38,193	Suncorp Stadium	Brisbane Broncos	Parramatta Eels	Round 23
37,994	Sydney Cricket Ground	Sydney Roosters	St. George Illawarra Dragons	Round 22
37,773	ANZ Stadium	Canterbury-Bankstown Bulldogs	St. George Illawarra Dragons	Round 10
36,212	Sydney Football Stadium	St. George Illawarra Dragons	Sydney Roosters	Round 7
34,662	ANZ Stadium	Canterbury-Bankstown Bulldogs	Parramatta Eels	Round 20
32,338	Suncorp Stadium	Brisbane Broncos	New Zealand Warriors	Round 3
31,911	ANZ Stadium	Parramatta Eels	Canterbury-Bankstown Bulldogs	Round 8
30,685	Sydney Cricket Ground	Wests Tigers	South Sydney Rabbitohs	Round 10
30,311	Suncorp Stadium	Brisbane Broncos	South Sydney Rabbitohs	Round 14
30,127	Suncorp Stadium	Brisbane Broncos	Wests Tigers	Round 17
30,120	ANZ Stadium	South Sydney Rabbitohs	Canterbury-Bankstown Bulldogs	Round 4
26,486	Suncorp Stadium	Brisbane Broncos	Sydney Roosters	Round 20
26,197	Skilled Park	Gold Coast Titans	Brisbane Broncos	Round 19
26,103	Skilled Park	Gold Coast Titans	Wests Tigers	Round 26
25,688	Suncorp Stadium	Brisbane Broncos	Cronulla Sharks	Round 6
25,480	Etihad Stadium	Melbourne Storm	St. George Illawarra Dragons	Round 4

== 2010 Transfers ==
=== Players ===
Player	2009 Club	2010 Club
Tonie Carroll	Brisbane Broncos	Retirement
Michael De Vere	Brisbane Broncos	Retirement
Aaron Gorrell	Brisbane Broncos	Retirement
Karmichael Hunt	Brisbane Broncos	Biarritz Olympique (French rugby union)
PJ Marsh	Brisbane Broncos	Retirement
Dave Taylor	Brisbane Broncos	South Sydney Rabbitohs
Stuart Flanagan	Canberra Raiders	Cronulla-Sutherland Sharks
Phil Graham	Canberra Raiders	Sydney Roosters
Nigel Plum	Canberra Raiders	Penrith Panthers
Adrian Purtell	Canberra Raiders	Penrith Panthers
Glen Turner	Canberra Raiders	Retirement
Greg Eastwood	Canterbury-Bankstown Bulldogs	Super League: Leeds Rhinos
Hazem El Masri	Canterbury-Bankstown Bulldogs	Retirement
Daryl Millard	Canterbury-Bankstown Bulldogs	Super League: Wakefield Trinity Wildcats
Lee Te Maari	Canterbury-Bankstown Bulldogs	Parramatta Eels
Michael Sullivan	Canterbury-Bankstown Bulldogs	Retirement
Matt Utai	Canterbury-Bankstown Bulldogs	N/A
Mitch Brown	Cronulla-Sutherland Sharks	Wests Tigers
Ian Donnelly	Cronulla-Sutherland Sharks	Retirement
Blake Green	Cronulla-Sutherland Sharks	Canterbury-Bankstown Bulldogs
Corey Hughes	Cronulla-Sutherland Sharks	Retirement
Brett Kearney	Cronulla-Sutherland Sharks	Super League: Bradford Bulls
Bryan Norrie	Cronulla-Sutherland Sharks	Melbourne Storm
Ben Ross	Cronulla-Sutherland Sharks	South Sydney Rabbitohs
Terence Seu Seu	Cronulla-Sutherland Sharks	Manly Warringah Sea Eagles
Brett Seymour	Cronulla-Sutherland Sharks	New Zealand Warriors
David Simmons	Cronulla-Sutherland Sharks	Penrith Panthers
Reece Williams	Cronulla-Sutherland Sharks	Retirement
Daniel Conn	Gold Coast Titans	Sydney Roosters
Brett Delaney	Gold Coast Titans	Super League: Leeds Rhinos
Adam Cuthbertson	Manly Warringah Sea Eagles	Cronulla-Sutherland Sharks
Glenn Hall	Manly Warringah Sea Eagles	Super League: Bradford Bulls
Heath L'Estrange	Manly Warringah Sea Eagles	Super League: Bradford Bulls
Matt Orford	Manly Warringah Sea Eagles	Super League: Bradford Bulls
Scott Anderson	Melbourne Storm	Brisbane Broncos
Will Chambers	Melbourne Storm	Queensland Reds (Super 14)
Matthew Cross	Melbourne Storm	Manly Warringah Sea Eagles
Wairangi Koopu	Melbourne Storm	Retirement
Steve Turner	Melbourne Storm	Canterbury-Bankstown Bulldogs
Danny Wicks	Newcastle Knights	Imprisonment
Nathan Fien	New Zealand Warriors	St. George Illawarra Dragons
Stacey Jones	New Zealand Warriors	Retirement
Denan Kemp	New Zealand Warriors	Brisbane Broncos
Steve Price	New Zealand Warriors	Retirement
Evarn Tuimavave	New Zealand Warriors	Newcastle Knights
Travis Burns	North Queensland Cowboys	Penrith Panthers
Shannon Hegarty	North Queensland Cowboys	Retirement
Shane Tronc	North Queensland Cowboys	Super League: Wakefield Trinity Wildcats
Joe Galuvao	Parramatta Eels	Manly Warringah Sea Eagles
Kevin Kingston	Parramatta Eels	Penrith Panthers
Todd Lowrie	Parramatta Eels	Melbourne Storm
Taulima Tautai	Parramatta Eels	Cronulla-Sutherland Sharks
Paul Aiton	Penrith Panthers	Cronulla-Sutherland Sharks
Junior Moors	Penrith Panthers	Wests Tigers
David Fa'alogo	South Sydney Rabbitohs	Super League: Huddersfield Giants
Michael Greenfield	South Sydney Rabbitohs	St. George Illawarra Dragons
David Kidwell	South Sydney Rabbitohs	Retirement
Craig Wing	South Sydney Rabbitohs	NTT Communications Shining Arcs (Japanese rugby union)
Mathew Head	St. George Illawarra Dragons	Retirement
Mickey Paea	St. George Illawarra Dragons	Canterbury-Bankstown Bulldogs
Justin Poore	St. George Illawarra Dragons	Parramatta Eels
Wendell Sailor	St. George Illawarra Dragons	Retirement
Chase Stanley	St. George Illawarra Dragons	Melbourne Storm
Riley Brown	Sydney Roosters	Gold Coast Titans
Craig Fitzgibbon	Sydney Roosters	Super League: Hull F.C.
Willie Mason	Sydney Roosters	North Queensland Cowboys
Mark O'Meley	Sydney Roosters	Super League: Hull F.C.
Shane Shackleton	Sydney Roosters	Parramatta Eels
Iosia Soliola	Sydney Roosters	Super League: St. Helens
Jordan Tansey	Sydney Roosters	Super League: Hull F.C.
Dean Collis	Wests Tigers	Cronulla-Sutherland Sharks
Danny Galea	Wests Tigers	Canberra Raiders
Dene Halatau	Wests Tigers	Canterbury-Bankstown Bulldogs
John Morris	Wests Tigers	Cronulla-Sutherland Sharks
Corey Payne	Wests Tigers	Canterbury-Bankstown Bulldogs
Taniela Tuiaki	Wests Tigers	Retirement
Sam Burgess	Super League: Bradford Bulls	South Sydney Rabbitohs
Greg Bird	Super League: Catalans Dragons	Gold Coast Titans
Adam Mogg	Super League: Catalans Dragons	Canberra Raiders
Jason Ryles	Super League: Catalans Dragons	Sydney Roosters
Liam Fulton	Super League: Huddersfield Giants	Wests Tigers
Josh Cordoba	Super League: Hull F.C.	Cronulla-Sutherland Sharks
Daniel Fitzhenry	Super League: Hull Kingston Rovers	Wests Tigers
Craig Stapleton	Super League: Salford City Reds	South Sydney Rabbitohs
Jason Cayless	Super League: St. Helens	Wests Tigers
Tim Smith	Super League: Wigan Warriors	Cronulla-Sutherland Sharks
Timana Tahu	New South Wales Waratahs (Super 14)	Parramatta Eels
Lote Tuqiri	Leicester Tigers (English rugby union)	Wests Tigers
Mark Gasnier	Stade Français (French rugby union)	St. George Illawarra Dragons
Clinton Toopi	Bay of Plenty Steamers (New Zealand rugby union)	Gold Coast Titans
Todd Carney	N/A	Sydney Roosters

=== Coaches ===
Coach	2009 Club	2010 Club
Brian Smith	Newcastle Knights	Sydney Roosters
John Lang	N/A	South Sydney Rabbitohs

== See also ==
- 2010 All Stars match
- 2010 State of Origin series
- 2010 NRL season results
- 2010 NRL Under-20s season
- 2010 in rugby league
- 2010 World Club Challenge
- 2010 Dally M Awards
