= 2010 South Sydney Rabbitohs season =

- NRL rank: 9th
- 2010 record: Wins: 9; draws: 0; losses: 8
- Points scored: For: 456; against: 379

Team information
- CEO: Shane Richardson
- Coach: John Lang
- Captain: Roy Asotasi
- Stadium: ANZ Stadium
- Avg. attendance: 404,546

Top scorers
- Tries: Nathan Merritt 16
- Goals: Issac Luke 46
- Points: Issac Luke 124
← 2009	2011 →

The 2010 South Sydney Rabbitohs season was the 101st in the club's history. It competed in the National Rugby League's 2010 Telstra Premiership and finished 9th out of 16 teams, only just missing out on a place in the finals. The coach of the club was John Lang and club captain was Roy Asotasi.

== Pre-season ==
The South Sydney Rabbitohs pre-season schedule began with a return to spiritual home Redfern Oval on Sunday 7 February, with the Rabbitohs winning 42–12 over the Manly-Warringah Sea Eagles. English Recruit Sam Burgess picked up his first try in Rabbitohs colours; Adam Reynolds, Jason Clark, Brock Molan, Kennedy Pettybourne, Josh Mansour, Curtis Johnston and Matt Mundine each scored a try.

Two weeks later the Rabbitohs took their pre-season to Coffs Harbour, New South Wales to play the Gold Coast Titans at BCU International Stadium in front of 5,500 supporters. The Titans took the match 28–22. Luke Capewell grabbed a double, while Issac Luke and Junior Vaivai scored the other two tries.

The Rabbitohs then took part in the traditional Charity Shield clash against the St George Illawarra Dragons. The Rabbitohs retained the Charity Shield after a 26–26 draw. Fetuli Fetuli Talanoa grabbed a treble; and Ben Lowe and Nathan Merritt scored the other two tries.

=== Results ===
Home team	Score	Away team	Crowd	Ground
South Sydney Rabbitohs	48–12	Manly-Warringah Sea Eagles	5,000	Redfern Oval
South Sydney Rabbitohs	22–26	Gold Coast Titans	5,550	BCU International Stadium
South Sydney Rabbitohs	26 -26	St George Illawarra Dragons	27,221	ANZ Stadium

== Regular season ==
=== Results ===
Date	Round	Opponent	Venue	Result	Tries	Goals	F. Goals	Attendance
14 Mar, 15:00	Round 1	Sydney Roosters	ANZ Stadium, Sydney	10–36	Merritt (2)	Luke (1con)		23,149
21 Mar, 15:00	Round 2	Gold Coast Titans	ANZ Stadium, Sydney	18–19	Champion (2), Tyrell	Luke (1con)		10,943
28 Mar, 15:00	Round 3	Cronulla-Sutherland Sharks	Toyota Stadium, Woolooware	30–8	Champion (2), Best, Burgess, Luke	Luke (4con), Sandow (1con)		10,741
2 Apr, 20:35	Round 4	Canterbury-Bankstown Bulldogs	ANZ Stadium	38–16	Burgess (2), Champion (2), Sandow, Merritt, Luke	Luke (3con), Sandow (2con)		30,120
11 Apr, 15:00	Round 5	Newcastle Knights	Bluetongue Stadium, Central Coast	28–10	Merritt (2), Champion, Talanoa, Wesser	Luke (4con)		16,098
16–19 Apr	Round 6	Parramatta Eels	ANZ Stadium	8–22	Talanoa, Best			25,152
23–26 Apr	Round 7	Canberra Raiders	Canberra Stadium, Canberra	26–24	Sutton, Merritt, Luke, Taylor, Wesser	Sandow (2con), Luke (1con)		13,145
30 Apr – 3 May	Round 8	Manly-Warringah Sea Eagles	ANZ Stadium	22–30	Champion (2), Taylor, Luke	Luke (3con)		15,459
	Round 9	BYE						
14–17 May	Round 10	Wests Tigers	SCG, Sydney	50–10	Merritt (3), Champion (2), Taylor, Sandow, Best, Talanoa	Luke (7con)		30,685
21–24 May	Round 11	New Zealand Warriors	Mt Smart Stadium, Auckland	24–26	Talanoa (2), Best, Wesser	Luke (4con)		13,235
28–31 May	Round 12	Penrith Panthers	ANZ Stadium	42–22	Wesser (2), Taylor, Sutton, Luke, Sandow, Champion	Luke (7con)		11,108
4–7 Jun	Round 13	North Queensland Cowboys	ANZ Stadium	32–4	Champion (2), Merritt (2), Taylor, Talanoa, Luke	Luke (1con), Sandow (1con)		9,688
11–14 Jun	Round 14	Brisbane Broncos	Suncorp Stadium, Brisbane	22–50	Merritt (2), Best, Lowe	Sandow (3con)		30,311
11–14 Jun	Round 15	Manly-Warringah Sea Eagles	Brookvale Oval, Brookvale	25–26	Luke (2), Wesser, Sandow	Luke (3con)	Sandow (1fieldgoal)	11,661
25–28 Jun	Round 16	Melbourne Storm	NIB Stadium	16–14	Talanoa (2), Sandow	Luke (2con)		13,164
	Round 17	BYE						
9–12 Jul	Round 18	Sydney Roosters	Sydney Football Stadium, Sydney	14–18	Falloon, Talanoa	Sandow (3con)		18,424
16–19 Jul	Round 19	St George Illawarra Dragons	ANZ Stadium	13–16	Asotasi, Sutton	Sandow(2con)	Sandow (1fieldgoal)	22,238
23–26 Jul	Round 20	New Zealand Warriors	ANZ Stadium	38–28	Talanoa (2), Merritt, Simpson, Pettybourne, Falloon, Sandow	Sandow (5con)		13,895
30 Jul – 2 Aug	Round 21	Canterbury Bulldogs	ANZ Stadium	12–32	Sandow (2)	Luke (2con)		
6–9 Aug	Round 22	Wests Tigers	ANZ Stadium	34–30	Farrell (3), Talanoa, Wesser, Sutton	Sandow (5con)		23,298
13–16 Aug	Round 23	Melbourne Storm	AAMI Park, Melbourne	16–18	Merritt (2), Capewell	Luke (2con)		
20–23 Aug	Round 24	Penrith Panthers	CUA Stadium, Penrith	18–54	Capewell, Wesser, Farrell	Sandow (3con)		
27–30 Aug	Round 25	Parramatta Eels	ANZ Stadium	24–14	Wesser, Lowe, Luke, Taylor	Sandow (4con)		
3–6 Sep	Round 26	St. George Illawarra Dragons	WIN Stadium, Wollongong	38–24				

== Ladder ==
2010 NRL season
Pos.	Team	Pld	W	D	L	B	PF	PA	PD	Pts
1	St. George Illawarra Dragons (P)	24	17	0	7	2	518	299	+219	38
2	Penrith Panthers	24	15	0	9	2	645	489	+156	34
3	Wests Tigers	24	15	0	9	2	537	503	+34	34
4	Gold Coast Titans	24	15	0	9	2	520	498	+22	34
5	New Zealand Warriors	24	14	0	10	2	539	486	+53	32
6	Sydney Roosters	24	14	0	10	2	559	510	+49	32
7	Canberra Raiders	24	13	0	11	2	499	493	+6	30
8	Manly Warringah Sea Eagles	24	12	0	12	2	545	510	+35	28
9	South Sydney Rabbitohs	24	11	0	13	2	584	567	+17	26
10	Brisbane Broncos	24	11	0	13	2	508	535	−27	26
11	Newcastle Knights	24	10	0	14	2	499	569	−70	24
12	Parramatta Eels	24	10	0	14	2	413	491	−78	24
13	Canterbury-Bankstown Bulldogs	24	9	0	15	2	494	539	−45	22
14	Cronulla-Sutherland Sharks	24	7	0	17	2	354	609	−255	18
15	North Queensland Cowboys	24	5	0	19	2	425	667	−242	14
16	Melbourne Storm	24	14	0	10	2	489	363	+126	0^{1}

^{1} Melbourne were deducted eight premiership points and barred from receiving premiership points for the rest of the season due to gross long-term salary cap breaches.

== Kit and Sponsors ==
=== National Australia Bank ===
The National Australia Bank was the Rabbitohs major home sponsor for the 2010 Telstra Premiership.

=== DeLonghi ===
DeLonghi was the major away sponsor for the Rabbitohs in the 2010 Telstra Premiership.

=== V8 Supercars Australia ===
V8 Supercars was the Rabbitohs major sleeve sponsor for the 2010 Telstra Premiership.

=== Virgin Blue ===
Virgin Blue was the Rabbitohs major training sponsor for the 2010 Telstra Premiership.

== Current squad ==
The following list comprises players who were in the Rabbitohs full-time first-grade squad for the 2010 season in the NRL Telstra Premiership.

No.

Position
Player

Roy Asotasi (C) – PR Colin Best – CE Sam Burgess – PR Luke Capewell – FE Beau Champion – CE Shaune Corrigan – CE Michael Crocker – SR Garrett Crossman – PR Jason Clark – LK Beau Falloon – HK Scott Geddes – PR Dylan Farrell – CE Ben Lowe – LK Jaiman Lowe – PR Issac Luke – HK

No.

Position
Player

Shannan McPherson – SR Chris McQueen – WG Nathan Merritt – WG Eddy Pettybourne – SR Ben Ross – PR Chris Sandow – HB Jamie Simpson – CE Craig Stapleton – PR Luke Stuart – SR John Sutton – FE Fetuli Talanoa – WG David Taylor – PR David Tyrrell – SR Taioalo Vaivai – CE Rhys Wesser – FB

== Player statistics ==
Player	Appearances	Tries	Goals	Field Goals	Total Points
–	–	–	–	–	–

== Representative honours ==
Player	All Stars	Anzac Test	City / Country	State of Origin 1	State of Origin 2	State of Origin 3	Four Nations
