= 2010 St. George Illawarra Dragons season =

- 2010 NRL premiers
- NRL rank: 1st
- 2010 record: Wins: 17; draws: 0; losses: 7
- Points scored: For: 591; against: 319

Team information
- CEO: (Australia) Peter Doust
- Coach: (Australia) Wayne Bennett
- Assistant coach: (Australia) Steve Price
- Captain: (Australia) Ben Hornby
- Stadium: WIN Jubilee Oval WIN Stadium

Top scorers
- Tries: Brett Morris (20)
- Goals: Jamie Soward (84)
- Points: Jamie Soward (197)
← 2009	2011 →

The 2010 St. George Illawarra Dragons season was the 12th in the joint venture club's history. They competed in the National Rugby League's 2010 Telstra Premiership, securing their second successive minor premiership. The Dragons went on to compete in the 2010 NRL Grand Final, defeating the Sydney Roosters to gain the club's first premiership since their formation as a joint venture club in 1999.

== Season summary ==
Restarting their ambitions of a maiden Premiership, the Dragons began the 2010 season without dual international Wendell Sailor after the winger announced his retirement during the pre-season. The Dragons had been competition favourites since day one of the 2010 season, and for all but three rounds of the entire regular season were on top of the ladder (the Sydney Roosters were on top after rounds 1 and 2 and the Melbourne Storm were on top after round 4, when they defeated the Dragons 17-4).

In the regular season of 2010, the Dragons lost only seven matches, against Melbourne in round 4, Manly in round 9, Canberra in rounds 11 and 24, Penrith in round 17, the Gold Coast in extra time in round 20 and Brisbane in round 21. The Dragons built their season on defence and when they finished the regular season, they became only the 2nd team in the NRL to concede less than 300 points in a season. 299 points were scored against them at an average of 12.4 points per game. The St George Illawarra Dragons headed into the week one of the finals and had a great victory against the Manly-Warringah Sea Eagles winning 28 - 0. After the week off the St George Illawarra Dragons faced the Wests Tigers in the preliminary final and won 13 - 12. The Dragons then faced the Sydney Roosters in the NRL Telstra Premiership Grand Final and despite trailing 6–8 at halftime they scored 26 unanswered points in a wet second half to win 32-8 and secure the first NRL Premiership for the joint venture.

A major coup for the club was the re-signing of former captain and star centre Mark Gasnier following his stint in French rugby union.

== Pre-season ==
Date	Round	Opponent	Venue	Score	Attendance	Report
14 February	Trial	Parramatta Eels	Members Equity Stadium, Perth	34 – 20	9,450	
20 February	Mercury Challenge	Canterbury-Bankstown Bulldogs	WIN Stadium, Wollongong	16 – 14		
27 February	Charity Shield	South Sydney Rabbitohs	ANZ Stadium, Sydney	26 – 26	27,221	
Legend: Win Loss Draw

== Regular season ==
Date	Round	Opponent	Venue	Score	Attendance	Report
12 March	1	Parramatta Eels	Parramatta Stadium, Parramatta	18 – 12	18,293	
19 March	2	Canterbury-Bankstown Bulldogs	WIN Stadium, Wollongong	26 – 6	16,177	
26 March	3	North Queensland Cowboys	WIN Stadium, Wollongong	33 – 8	13,267	
2 April	4	Melbourne Storm	Etihad Stadium, Melbourne	4 – 17	25,480	
9 April	5	Brisbane Broncos	WIN Stadium, Wollongong	34 – 16	15,374	
16 April	6	Gold Coast Titans	Skilled Park, Gold Coast	19 – 6	21,336	
25 April	7	Sydney Roosters	Sydney Football Stadium, Sydney	28 – 6	36,212	
1 May	8	Cronulla-Sutherland Sharks	WIN Stadium, Wollongong	38 – 0	15,779	
8 May	9	Manly-Warringah Sea Eagles	Brookvale Oval, Manly	6 – 24	16,745	
14 May	10	Canterbury-Bankstown Bulldogs	ANZ Stadium, Sydney	19 – 6	37,773	
23 May	11	Canberra Raiders	WIN Stadium, Wollongong	14 – 22	14,728	
28 May	12	Parramatta Eels	WIN Jubilee Oval, Kogarah	30 – 0	15,068	
6 June	13	New Zealand Warriors	Mount Smart Stadium, Auckland	22 – 20	8,312	
	14					
20 June	15	Cronulla-Sutherland Sharks	Toyota Stadium, Cronulla	22 – 4	16,773	
25 June	16	Wests Tigers	WIN Jubilee Oval, Kogarah	34 – 10	16,574	
5 July	17	Penrith Panthers	WIN Jubilee Oval, Kogarah	8 – 12	12,974	
	18					
16 July	19	South Sydney Rabbitohs	ANZ Stadium, Sydney	16 – 13	22,368	
23 July	20	Gold Coast Titans	WIN Jubilee Oval, Kogarah	10 – 11	12,688	
1 August	21	Brisbane Broncos	Suncorp Stadium, Brisbane	6 – 10	42,269	
8 August	22	Sydney Roosters	Sydney Cricket Ground, Sydney	19 – 12	37,994	
16 August	23	Manly-Warringah Sea Eagles	WIN Jubilee Oval, Kogarah	32 – 10	14,740	
22 August	24	Canberra Raiders	Canberra Stadium, Canberra	16 – 32	20,445	
28 August	25	Newcastle Knights	EnergyAustralia Stadium, Newcastle	26 – 18	23,148	
5 September	26	South Sydney Rabbitohs	WIN Jubilee Oval, Kogarah	38 – 24	18,274	
Legend: Win Loss Draw Bye

== Finals ==
Date	Round	Opponent	Venue	Score	Attendance	Report
12 September	Qualifying Final	Manly-Warringah Sea Eagles	WIN Jubilee Oval, Kogarah	28 – 0	15,574	
25 September	Preliminary Final	Wests Tigers	ANZ Stadium, Sydney	13 – 12	71,212	
3 October	Grand Final	Sydney Roosters	ANZ Stadium, Sydney	32 – 8	82,334	
Legend: Win Loss Draw

== 2010 NRL Ladder ==
2010 NRL season
Pos.	Team	Pld	W	D	L	B	PF	PA	PD	Pts
1	St. George Illawarra Dragons (P)	24	17	0	7	2	518	299	+219	38
2	Penrith Panthers	24	15	0	9	2	645	489	+156	34
3	Wests Tigers	24	15	0	9	2	537	503	+34	34
4	Gold Coast Titans	24	15	0	9	2	520	498	+22	34
5	New Zealand Warriors	24	14	0	10	2	539	486	+53	32
6	Sydney Roosters	24	14	0	10	2	559	510	+49	32
7	Canberra Raiders	24	13	0	11	2	499	493	+6	30
8	Manly Warringah Sea Eagles	24	12	0	12	2	545	510	+35	28
9	South Sydney Rabbitohs	24	11	0	13	2	584	567	+17	26
10	Brisbane Broncos	24	11	0	13	2	508	535	−27	26
11	Newcastle Knights	24	10	0	14	2	499	569	−70	24
12	Parramatta Eels	24	10	0	14	2	413	491	−78	24
13	Canterbury-Bankstown Bulldogs	24	9	0	15	2	494	539	−45	22
14	Cronulla-Sutherland Sharks	24	7	0	17	2	354	609	−255	18
15	North Queensland Cowboys	24	5	0	19	2	425	667	−242	14
16	Melbourne Storm	24	14	0	10	2	489	363	+126	0^{1}

^{1} Melbourne were deducted eight premiership points and barred from receiving premiership points for the rest of the season due to gross long-term salary cap breaches.

== Squad ==
No.

Position
Player

1 Darius Boyd – FB 2 Brett Morris – WG 3 Matt Cooper – CE 4 Mark Gasnier – CE 5 Jason Nightingale – WG 6 Jamie Soward – FE (GK) 7 Ben Hornby (captain) – HB 8 Dan Hunt – PR 9 Dean Young – HK (VC) 10 Michael Weyman – PR 11 Beau Scott – SR 12 Ben Creagh – SR 13 Jeremy Smith – LK

No.

Position
Player

Nathan Fien – HK Neville Costigan – SR Matt Prior – SR Jarrod Saffy – SR Trent Merrin – PR Michael Greenfield – PR Nick Emmett – CE Luke Priddis – HK Jon Green – PR Kyle Stanley – FE Ricky Thorby – PR Peni Tagive – WG Michael Lett – WG

*VC - Vice Captain *GK - Goal Kicker

== Transfers ==
Gains

Player	Gained From
Michael Greenfield	South Sydney Rabbitohs
Peni Tagive	Wests Tigers
Junior Paulo	Parramatta Eels
Mark Gasnier	Stade Français

Losses

Player	Lost To
Mickey Paea	Canterbury Bankstown Bulldogs
Justin Poore	Parramatta Eels
Wendell Sailor	Retirement
Chase Stanley	Melbourne Storm
Dean Whare	Manly-Warringah Sea Eagles
