= 2010 Parramatta Eels season =

Australia Rugby League Parramatta Eels 2010 season

- NRL Rank: 12th
- Play-off result: DNQ
- World Club Challenge: DNQ
- 2010 record: Wins: 10; draws: 0; losses: 14
- Points scored: For: 413; against: 491

Team information
- CEO: Paul Osborne
- Coach: (Australia) Daniel Anderson
- Captain: (New Zealand) Nathan Cayless (Australia) Nathan Hindmarsh
- Stadium: Parramatta Stadium (Capacity: 20,741); ANZ Stadium (Capacity: 83,500)
- Avg. attendance: 17,080 (Home); 17,892 (Home & Away)
- Agg. attendance: 204,957 (Home); 429,403 (Home & Away)
- High attendance: 31,991 (30 April vs Canterbury-Bankstown Bulldogs, Round 8)

Top scorers
- Tries: (Australia) Jarryd Hayne (11) (New Zealand) Krisnan Inu
- Goals: (Australia) Luke Burt (63)
- Points: (Australia) Luke Burt (155)
← 2009	List of seasons	2011 →

The 2010 Parramatta Eels season is the 64th in the club's history. Coached by Daniel Anderson and captained by Nathan Cayless and Nathan Hindmarsh, they competed in the NRL's 2010 Telstra Premiership. The Parramatta club finished the regular season in 12th place failing to make the finals for the first time in two years.

== Summary ==
The Parramatta Eels were picked at the beginning of the year by many leading betting agencies to take out the premiership for 2010 following their surge of form which took them to the Grand Final in 2009. But, after a relatively poor to the season, and then a four-game winning streak, the Parramatta Eels once again returned to the inconsistent form of past seasons. This inconsistent form, recognised by all Rugby League fans, saw them miss out on the Top 8 in 2010.

After a season of unrelenting disappointment which saw five-eighth Daniel Mortimer dropped to reserve grade, centre Timana Tahu being suspended for an on-field confrontation against the Newcastle Knights and reports of player rifts, Daniel Anderson was sacked unceremoniously as Parramatta coach and replaced by New Zealand World Cup-winning coach Stephen Kearney.

== Standings ==
=== National Rugby League ===
2010 NRL season
Pos.	Team	Pld	W	D	L	B	PF	PA	PD	Pts
1	St. George Illawarra Dragons (P)	24	17	0	7	2	518	299	+219	38
2	Penrith Panthers	24	15	0	9	2	645	489	+156	34
3	Wests Tigers	24	15	0	9	2	537	503	+34	34
4	Gold Coast Titans	24	15	0	9	2	520	498	+22	34
5	New Zealand Warriors	24	14	0	10	2	539	486	+53	32
6	Sydney Roosters	24	14	0	10	2	559	510	+49	32
7	Canberra Raiders	24	13	0	11	2	499	493	+6	30
8	Manly Warringah Sea Eagles	24	12	0	12	2	545	510	+35	28
9	South Sydney Rabbitohs	24	11	0	13	2	584	567	+17	26
10	Brisbane Broncos	24	11	0	13	2	508	535	−27	26
11	Newcastle Knights	24	10	0	14	2	499	569	−70	24
12	Parramatta Eels	24	10	0	14	2	413	491	−78	24
13	Canterbury-Bankstown Bulldogs	24	9	0	15	2	494	539	−45	22
14	Cronulla-Sutherland Sharks	24	7	0	17	2	354	609	−255	18
15	North Queensland Cowboys	24	5	0	19	2	425	667	−242	14
16	Melbourne Storm	24	14	0	10	2	489	363	+126	0^{1}

^{1} Melbourne were deducted eight premiership points and barred from receiving premiership points for the rest of the season due to gross long-term salary cap breaches.

=== National Youth Competition ===
National Youth Competition season 2010
	Team	Pld	W	D	L	B	PF	PA	PD	Pts
1	South Sydney Rabbitohs	24	17	0	7	2	687	567	+120	38
2	New Zealand Warriors (P)	24	16	1	7	2	731	481	+250	37
3	Canterbury-Bankstown Bulldogs	24	15	2	7	2	773	596	+177	36
4	North Queensland Cowboys	24	14	3	7	2	673	540	+133	35
5	Sydney Roosters	24	14	1	9	2	695	588	+107	33
6	Canberra Raiders	24	14	1	9	2	764	734	+30	33
7	Manly Warringah Sea Eagles	24	13	0	11	2	568	583	-15	30
8	Gold Coast Titans	24	12	1	11	2	581	663	-82	29
9	Wests Tigers	24	12	0	12	2	620	532	+88	28
10	Brisbane Broncos	24	11	1	12	2	690	635	+55	27
11	St. George Illawarra Dragons	24	10	1	13	2	568	543	+25	25
12	Newcastle Knights	24	9	1	14	2	612	732	-120	23
13	Melbourne Storm	24	8	2	14	2	683	782	-99	22
14	Cronulla-Sutherland Sharks	24	8	1	15	2	492	634	-142	21
15	Penrith Panthers	24	8	0	16	2	643	838	-195	20
16	Parramatta Eels	24	3	1	20	2	454	786	-332	11

== Fixtures ==
=== Pre-season ===
Date	Round	Opponent	Venue	Result	Score	Tries	Goals	Attendance	Report
14 February	Match 1	St George Illawarra Dragons	ME Bank Stadium, Perth	Loss	34–20	Robson (2), K. Keating, Uaisele	Humble 1, Mortimer 1	9,450	
20 February	Match 2	Penrith Panthers	CUA Stadium, Penrith	Loss	32–12	B. Smith, Burt	Burt 2	11,113	
27 February	Match 3	Sydney Roosters	Bluetongue Central Coast Stadium, Gosford	Loss	40–14	Reddy, Oake, Mateo	Burt 1	18,511	

=== Home and away season ===
Date	Round	Opponent	Venue	Result	Score	Tries	Goals	Attendance	Report
12 March	Round 1	St George Illawarra Dragons	Parramatta Stadium, Parramatta	Loss	12–18	Burt, Grothe	Burt 2/2	18,293	
21 March	Round 2	Manly Warringah Sea Eagles	Parramatta Stadium, Parramatta	Win	24–20	Grothe, Moimoi, Reddy, Tahu	Burt 4/4	15,602	
26 March	Round 3	Wests Tigers	Sydney Football Stadium, Sydney	Loss	23–12	Inu, Reddy	Burt 2/2	21,318	
3 April	Round 4	Cronulla Sharks	Toyota Stadium, Woolooware	Loss	11–0	Nil	Nil	13,213	
12 April	Round 5	Canberra Raiders	Parramatta Stadium, Parramatta	Loss	14–24	Burt (2), B. Smith	Burt 1/3	15,122	
18 April	Round 6	South Sydney Rabbitohs	Sydney Football Stadium, Sydney	Win	22–8	Burt, Mortimer, Tahu	Burt 5/5	25,152	
23 April	Round 7	North Queensland Cowboys	Dairy Farmers Stadium, Townsville	Win	18–24	Tahu (2), Burt, Inu, B. Smith	Burt 4/4	11,335	
30 April	Round 8	Canterbury Bankstown Bulldogs	Stadium Australia, Sydney	Win	26–10	Burt, Hayne, Inu, K. Keating, Reddy	Burt 3/5	31,991	
7–10 May	Round 9	Bye							
17 May	Round 10	Manly Warringah Sea Eagles	Brookvale Oval, Manly	Win	12–19	Burt, Mateo, Robson	Burt 3/3 & FG: 1/1	15,602	
22 May	Round 11	Cronulla Sharks	Parramatta Stadium, Parramatta	Loss	18–22	Humble, Mortimer, Robson	Burt 3/3	13,058	
28 May	Round 12	St George Illawarra Dragons	WIN Jubilee Stadium, Kogarah	Loss	30–0	Nil	Nil	15,068	
4 June	Round 13	Melbourne Storm	Parramatta Stadium, Parramatta	Win	24–10	Reddy (2), Inu, K. Keating	Burt 4/5	7,572	
11–14 June	Round 14	Bye							
21 June	Round 15	Newcastle Knights	EnergyAustralia Stadium, Newcastle	Loss	4–6	Horo	Burt 0/2	8,474	
26 June	Round 16	Brisbane Broncos	Parramatta Stadium, Parramatta	Loss	6–10	Hayne	Burt 1/2	15,929	
4 July	Round 17	New Zealand Warriors	Mt Smart Stadium, Auckland	Loss	35–6	Humble	Burt 1/1	9,912	
12 July	Round 18	North Queensland Cowboys	Parramatta Stadium, Parramatta	Win	36–24	Hayne (3), Inu, Reddy, Robson	Burt 6/6	11,177	
17 July	Round 19	Penrith Panthers	Penrith Park, Penrith	Win	28–34	Inu (2), Wright (2), Hayne, Moimoi	Burt 5/6	22,582	
23 July	Round 20	Canterbury Bulldogs	ANZ Stadium, Sydney	Win	16–32	Hayne (2), Inu (2), B. Smith	Burt 6/7	34,662	
31 July	Round 21	Sydney Roosters	Parramatta Stadium, Parramatta	Loss	12–48	Hayne, Hindmarsh	Burt 2/2	19,824	
6 August	Round 22	Gold Coast Titans	Skilled Park, Gold Coast	Loss	12–34	Hayne, Reddy	Burt 2/2	19,568	
13 August	Round 23	Brisbane Broncos	Suncorp Stadium, Brisbane	Win	30–14	Burt, Hayne, Inu, Mitchell, Reddy	Burt 5/5	38,193	
22 August	Round 24	Wests Tigers	Parramatta Stadium, Parramatta	Loss	18–20	Horo, Inu, Mitchell	Burt 3/4	19,854	
27 August	Round 25	South Sydney	ANZ Stadium, Sydney	Loss	16–24	Horo, Inu, Mateo	Burt 2/3	19,098	
4 September	Round 26	New Zealand Warriors	Parramatta Stadium, Parramatta	Loss	12–26	Cayless, Tahu	Burt 1/1, Inu 1/2	11,383	

== Players and staff ==
The playing squad and coaching staff of the Parramatta Eels for the 2010 NRL season as of 31 August 2010.

No.

Position
Player

585 Nathan Cayless – PR (c) 595 Nathan Hindmarsh – SR (c) 602 Luke Burt – WG 608 Eric Grothe, Jr. – WG 665 Fuifui Moimoi – PR 673 Feleti Mateo – LK 674 Ben Smith – SR 679 Timana Tahu – CE 683 Joel Reddy – CE 690 Jarryd Hayne – FB 695 Krisnan Inu – CE 700 Matt Keating – HK

No.

Position
Player

701 Brendan Oake – SR 702 Kris Keating – FE 705 Tim Mannah – PR 706 Jeff Robson – HB 707 Etu Uaisele – WG 710 Daniel Mortimer – FE 712 Jonathan Wright – CE 713 Shane Shackleton – SR 714 Justin Poore – PR 715 Justin Horo – SR 716 Tom Humble – FE 717 Pele Peletelese – PR

== Transfers ==
In:

Player	2009 Club
Justin Poore	St George Illawarra Dragons
Shane Shackleton	Sydney Roosters
Timana Tahu	NSW Waratahs (Rugby union)

Out:

Player	2010 Club
Joe Galuvao	Manly Warringah Sea Eagles
Todd Lowrie	Melbourne Storm
Brett Finch	Melbourne Storm (mid season 2009)
Kevin Kingston	Penrith Panthers
Jeremy Latimore	Cronulla Sutherland Sharks

== Awards ==
The following awards were awarded in the post-season:

- Michael Cronin clubman of the year award: Dr Steve McNamara
- Ken Thornett Medal (Players' player): Jarryd Hayne
- Jack Gibson Award (Coach's award): Tim Mannah
- Eric Grothe Rookie of the Year Award: Justin Horo
