= 2010 Manly Warringah Sea Eagles season =

← 2009	2011 →

The 2010 Manly Warringah Sea Eagles season was the 61st in the club's history. Coached by Des Hasler and captained by Jamie Lyon & Jason King, they competed in the National Rugby League's 2010 Telstra Premiership, finishing the regular season 8th (out of 16), reaching the finals series. The Sea Eagles were then knocked out in their first finals match against eventual Premiers, St. George Illawarra Dragons.

The club had five of its players selected to play in the mid-season 2010 State of Origin series: Matt Ballin, Jamie Lyon, Jason King, Josh Perry and Anthony Watmough. Two of these players, Watmough and Perry, were selected to play internationally for Australia. Kieran Foran and Steve Matai were selected to play for New Zealand.

2010 NRL season
Pos.	Team	Pld	W	D	L	B	PF	PA	PD	Pts
1	St. George Illawarra Dragons (P)	24	17	0	7	2	518	299	+219	38
2	Penrith Panthers	24	15	0	9	2	645	489	+156	34
3	Wests Tigers	24	15	0	9	2	537	503	+34	34
4	Gold Coast Titans	24	15	0	9	2	520	498	+22	34
5	New Zealand Warriors	24	14	0	10	2	539	486	+53	32
6	Sydney Roosters	24	14	0	10	2	559	510	+49	32
7	Canberra Raiders	24	13	0	11	2	499	493	+6	30
8	Manly Warringah Sea Eagles	24	12	0	12	2	545	510	+35	28
9	South Sydney Rabbitohs	24	11	0	13	2	584	567	+17	26
10	Brisbane Broncos	24	11	0	13	2	508	535	−27	26
11	Newcastle Knights	24	10	0	14	2	499	569	−70	24
12	Parramatta Eels	24	10	0	14	2	413	491	−78	24
13	Canterbury-Bankstown Bulldogs	24	9	0	15	2	494	539	−45	22
14	Cronulla-Sutherland Sharks	24	7	0	17	2	354	609	−255	18
15	North Queensland Cowboys	24	5	0	19	2	425	667	−242	14
16	Melbourne Storm	24	14	0	10	2	489	363	+126	0^{1}

^{1} Melbourne were deducted eight premiership points and barred from receiving premiership points for the rest of the season due to gross long-term salary cap breaches. Awards:

NRL:

- Roy Bull Best and Fairest: Jason King
- Players' Player: Jamie Lyon
- Leading point scorer: Jamie Lyon
- Leading try scorer: Tony Williams
- Rookie of the Year: Trent Hodkinson
- Gordon Willoughby Medal (Members' player of the year): Jamie Lyon
  - (2nd place) Matt Ballin
  - (3rd place) Steve Matai
- Steve Menzies Medal: "Barefoot" Bob Butcher
- Doug Daley Memorial Clubman of the Year: George Rose

Under 20s:

- Russ Bull Best and Fairest: Magnus Stromquist
- Players' Player: Gary Riccardi
