= 2010 Gold Coast Titans season =

Coordinates: 28°4′1″S 153°22′44″E

- NRL rank: 4th
- Play-off result: Lost Preliminary Final (Sydney Roosters, 6–32)
- 2010 record: Wins: 16; draws: 0; losses: 10
- Points scored: For: 554; against: 546

Team information
- CEO: Michael Searle
- Coach: John Cartwright
- Captain: Scott Prince
- Stadium: Skilled Park
- Avg. attendance: 17,877
- High attendance: 26,197

Top scorers
- Tries: Kevin Gordon 12
- Goals: Scott Prince 66
- Points: Scott Prince 151
| ← 2009 | List of seasons | 2011 → |

The 2010 Gold Coast Titans season was the 4th in the club's history and they competed in the NRL's 2010 Telstra Premiership. They were coached by John Cartwright and captain by Scott Prince. Gold Coast finishing the regular season 4th (out of 16) and fell just one game short of the Grand Final losing to the Sydney Roosters in the Preliminary Final.

== Season summary ==
The Gold Coast Titans began the season with a come-from-behind 24–18 victory against the New Zealand Warriors at home. A golden point win over Souths followed, in what was a long match that didn't finish until around 11:30pm Queensland time (10:30pm Sydney time; as the match kicked off at 8:30pm). A 24–4 win over the Canberra Raiders at home followed before the Titans lost its first match of the season against the North Queensland Cowboys in Townsville. The Titans bounced back a week later to beat the Melbourne Storm at home before stumbling against the St. George Illawarra Dragons in round six. The Titans then had a three-match winning streak before stumbling against rivals Brisbane in round ten, the Sydney Roosters in round 12 and the Canberra Raiders in round 13. The Titans got back on track with a 28–14 win over the Manly-Warringah Sea Eagles at home, which was backed up with a win over the Bulldogs in round 15 before an unexpected defeat against the Newcastle Knights at home the following round. This trigged the Titans' second three-match losing streak in the season, however the Titans would emerge from their form slump and the dreaded State of Origin period with a golden point 11–10 victory over the Dragons at Kogarah where neither of the Gold Coast franchises had never won. They would lose only one more game for the rest of the regular season, against battlers Cronulla in Cronulla in the penultimate round of the season in what was also Greg Bird's return to the Shire since the Sharks sacked him in 2008.

Finishing fourth at the end of the season (a place lower than their 3rd finish in 2009), the Titans, as the only Queensland representation in the finals, entered the finals series with high expectations. They defeated the New Zealand Warriors easily 28–16 and as a result earned a week off (two of the top three teams lost on the weekend) and a home preliminary final at Suncorp Stadium. Unfortunately, the Titans saved their worst for last, losing 32–6 against the Sydney Roosters who progressed to the Grand Final a season after finishing last.

== Players ==
| No | Nat | Player | 1st Position | 2nd Position | Age | Height | Weight | NRL Games | Previous 1st Grade Club |
|---|---|---|---|---|---|---|---|---|---|
| 1 | (Australia) | Preston Campbell | Fullback | Five-Eighth | 32 | 167 | 75 | 228 | Penrith Panthers |
| 2 | (Australia) | Kevin Gordon | Wing | Fullback | 19 | 183 | 90 | 23 | None |
| 3 | (Australia) | Esi Tonga | Centre | Wing | 21 | 190 | 100 | 17 | None |
| 4 | (Australia) | Jordan Atkins | Wing | Centre | 26 | 188 | 96 | 23 | None |
| 5 | (Australia) | David Mead | Wing | Fullback | 20 | 183 | 90 | 14 | None |
| 6 | (Australia) | Mat Rogers | Five-Eighth | Centre | 33 | 178 | 85 | 178 | NSW Waratahs |
| 7 | (Australia) | Scott Prince | Halfback | Five-Eighth | 29 | 177 | 80 | 215 | Wests Tigers |
| 8 | (Australia) | Luke Bailey | Prop | | 29 | 189 | 108 | 169 | St. George Illawarra Dragons |
| 9 | (Australia) | Nathan Friend | Hooker | | 28 | 170 | 85 | 105 | Melbourne Storm |
| 10 | (Australia) | Matthew White | Prop | | 25 | 189 | 112 | 36 | Newcastle Knights |
| 11 | (Australia) | Anthony Laffranchi | Second Row | Prop | 28 | 185 | 100 | 165 | Wests Tigers |
| 12 | (Australia) | Mark Minichiello | Second Row | Lock | 27 | 180 | 98 | 147 | South Sydney Rabbitohs |
| 13 | (Australia) | Ashley Harrison | Lock | Second Row | 28 | 188 | 95 | 196 | South Sydney Rabbitohs |
| 14 | (Australia) | Michael Henderson | Prop | | 25 | 186 | 103 | 73 | St. George Illawarra Dragons |
| 15 | (Australia) | Brad Meyers | Prop | Second Row | 29 | 190 | 103 | 148 | Bradford Bulls |
| 16 | (Australia) | Luke O'Dwyer | Second Row | Centre | 26 | 180 | 92 | 73 | Parramatta Eels |
| 17 | (Australia) | William Zillman | Fullback | Centre | 23 | 181 | 90 | 37 | Canberra Raiders |
| 18 | (Australia) | Aaron Cannings | Prop | Lock | 27 | 187 | 108 | 95 | Parramatta Eels |
| 19 | (Australia) | Will Matthews | Prop | Second Row | 21 | 187 | 101 | 23 | None |
| 20 | (Australia) | Joe Tomane | Wing | Centre | 19 | 187 | 101 | 11 | Melbourne Storm |
| 21 | (Australia) | Josh Graham | Centre | Lock | 26 | 190 | 98 | 49 | Western Force |
| 22 | (Australia) | Sam Tagataese | Second Row | Centre | 22 | 192 | 100 | 23 | Melbourne Storm |
| 23 | (Australia) | Shannon Walker | Fullback | Wing | 20 | 174 | 81 | 3 | None |
| 24 | (Australia) | Bodene Thompson | Second Row | Centre | 21 | 183 | 112 | 2 | None |
| 25 | (Australia) | Selasi Berdie | Prop | Second Row | 23 | 183 | 100 | 2 | None |
| 26 | (Australia) | Kayne Lawton | Hooker | Halfback | 20 | 174 | 83 | 1 | None |
| 27 | (Australia) | Greg Bird | Lock | Five-Eighth | 25 | 183 | 102 | 128 | Catalans Dragons |
| 28 | (Australia) | Jackson Nicolau | Five-Eighth | Centre | 22 | 187 | 90 | 2 | North Queensland Cowboys |
| 29 | (Australia) | Riley Brown | Hooker | Lock | 25 | 180 | 96 | 67 | Sydney Roosters |
| 30 | (Australia) | Marshall Chalk | Centre | Wing | 28 | 181 | 94 | 84 | Canberra Raiders |

=== Paul Broughton Medal ===
After playing the Titans last few matches of the 2010 NRL season with a broken thumb, Luke Bailey was awarded his second Paul Broughton Medal for the club's player of the year.

== Squad Movement ==
=== Gains ===
| Players | Signed From | Until End of | Notes |
|---|---|---|---|
| Greg Bird | Catalans Dragons | 2010 | |
| Riley Brown | Sydney Roosters | 2011 | |
| Marshall Chalk | Crusaders | 2010 | |
| Steve Michaels | Brisbane Broncos (Mid-season) | 2012 | |
| Joe Tomane | Melbourne Storm | 2011 | |
| Clinton Toopi | Bay of Plenty | 2010 | |

=== Losses ===
| Players | Signed To | Until End of | Notes |
|---|---|---|---|
| Brenton Bowen | Northern Pride (Queensland Cup) | 2010 | |
| Daniel Conn | Sydney Roosters | 2011 | |
| Brett Delaney | Leeds Rhinos | 2012 | |
| Ben Jeffery | Released | | |
| Chris Walker | Catalans Dragons | 2011 | |

=== Re-signings ===
| Players | Club | Until End of | Notes |
|---|---|---|---|
| Greg Bird | Gold Coast Titans | 2011 | |
| Kevin Gordon | Gold Coast Titans | 2014 | |
| Ryan James | Gold Coast Titans | 2014 | |
| David Mead | Gold Coast Titans | 2013 | |
| Mark Minichiello | Gold Coast Titans | 2012 | |
| Ben Ridge | Gold Coast Titans | 2013 | |
| Sam Tagataese | Gold Coast Titans | 2013 | |
| Bodene Thompson | Gold Coast Titans | 2013 | |
| Clinton Toopi | Gold Coast Titans | 2011 | |

== Ladder ==
2010 NRL season
| Pos. | Team | Pld | W | D | L | B | PF | PA | PD | Pts |
|---|---|---|---|---|---|---|---|---|---|---|
| 1 | St. George Illawarra Dragons (P) | 24 | 17 | 0 | 7 | 2 | 518 | 299 | +219 | 38 |
| 2 | Penrith Panthers | 24 | 15 | 0 | 9 | 2 | 645 | 489 | +156 | 34 |
| 3 | Wests Tigers | 24 | 15 | 0 | 9 | 2 | 537 | 503 | +34 | 34 |
| 4 | Gold Coast Titans | 24 | 15 | 0 | 9 | 2 | 520 | 498 | +22 | 34 |
| 5 | New Zealand Warriors | 24 | 14 | 0 | 10 | 2 | 539 | 486 | +53 | 32 |
| 6 | Sydney Roosters | 24 | 14 | 0 | 10 | 2 | 559 | 510 | +49 | 32 |
| 7 | Canberra Raiders | 24 | 13 | 0 | 11 | 2 | 499 | 493 | +6 | 30 |
| 8 | Manly Warringah Sea Eagles | 24 | 12 | 0 | 12 | 2 | 545 | 510 | +35 | 28 |
| 9 | South Sydney Rabbitohs | 24 | 11 | 0 | 13 | 2 | 584 | 567 | +17 | 26 |
| 10 | Brisbane Broncos | 24 | 11 | 0 | 13 | 2 | 508 | 535 | −27 | 26 |
| 11 | Newcastle Knights | 24 | 10 | 0 | 14 | 2 | 499 | 569 | −70 | 24 |
| 12 | Parramatta Eels | 24 | 10 | 0 | 14 | 2 | 413 | 491 | −78 | 24 |
| 13 | Canterbury-Bankstown Bulldogs | 24 | 9 | 0 | 15 | 2 | 494 | 539 | −45 | 22 |
| 14 | Cronulla-Sutherland Sharks | 24 | 7 | 0 | 17 | 2 | 354 | 609 | −255 | 18 |
| 15 | North Queensland Cowboys | 24 | 5 | 0 | 19 | 2 | 425 | 667 | −242 | 14 |
| 16 | Melbourne Storm | 24 | 14 | 0 | 10 | 2 | 489 | 363 | +126 | 0^{1} |

^{1} Melbourne were deducted eight premiership points and barred from receiving premiership points for the rest of the season due to gross long-term salary cap breaches.

== Fixtures ==
=== Regular season ===
| Date | Round | Opponent | Venue | Score | Tries | Goals | Attendance |
|---|---|---|---|---|---|---|---|
| Sunday, 14 March | Round 1 | New Zealand Warriors | Skilled Park | 24 – 18 | Tomane, Laffranchi, Mead, Campbell | Prince (4/4) | 16,112 |
| Friday, 19 March | Round 2 | South Sydney Rabbitohs | ANZ Stadium | 19 – 18 | Zillman, Laffranchi, Tomane | Prince (3/4) & (FG) | 10,943 |
| Saturday, 27 March | Round 3 | Canberra Raiders | Skilled Park | 24 – 4 | Prince, Tomane, Gordon, Mead | Prince (4/5) | 11,521 |
| Saturday, 3 April | Round 4 | North Queensland Cowboys | Dairy Farmers Stadium | 18 – 32 | Minichiello (2), Tagataese | Rogers (3/3) | 15,551 |
| Friday, 9 April | Round 5 | Melbourne Storm | Skilled Park | 20 – 16 | Tomane, Harrison, Bird | Rogers (4/5) | 20,083 |
| Friday, 16 April | Round 6 | St George Illawarra Dragons | Skilled Park | 6 – 19 | Henderson | Campbell (1/1) | 21,336 |
| Monday, 26 April | Round 7 | Manly-Warringah Sea Eagles | Brookvale Oval | 24 – 22 | Gordon (2), Campbell, Laffranchi | Campbell (4/4) | 15,195 |
| Saturday, 1 May | Round 8 | Penrith Panthers | Skilled Park | 38 – 24 | Prince, Laffranchi, Harrison, Toopi, Bird, Bailey | Prince (7/7) | 15,430 |
| Sunday, 9 May | Round 9 | Newcastle Knights | EnergyAustralia Stadium | 38 – 36 | Toopi (2), Campbell, Tomane, Minichiello, Mead, Bird | Prince (5/7) | 13,384 |
| Friday, 14 May | Round 10 | Brisbane Broncos | Suncorp Stadium | 6 – 28 | Tomane | Prince (1/1) | 40,168 |
| | Round 11 | Bye | | | | | |
| Monday, 31 May | Round 12 | Sydney Roosters | Skilled Park | 16 – 30 | Mead (3) | Prince (2/3) | 13,235 |
| Sunday, 6 June | Round 13 | Canberra Raiders | Canberra Stadium | 24 – 28 | Tomane, Minichiello, Prince, Laffranchi | Prince (4/4) | 10,425 |
| Friday, 11 June | Round 14 | Manly-Warringah Sea Eagles | Skilled Park | 28 – 14 | Gordon (2), Minichiello, Tagataese, Bailey | Prince (4/6) | 17,508 |
| Friday, 18 June | Round 15 | Canterbury-Bankstown Bulldogs | Suncorp Stadium | 25 – 24 | Gordon, Minichiello, Zillman, Laffranchi | Prince (2/3), Rogers (2/2), Bird (FG) | 42,233 |
| Sunday, 27 June | Round 16 | Newcastle Knights | Skilled Park | 16 – 24 | Harrison, Meyers, Zillman | Rogers (2/3) | 13,396 |
| | Round 17 | Bye | | | | | |
| Friday, 9 July | Round 18 | Wests Tigers | Campbelltown Stadium | 14 – 15 | Rogers, Gordon | Rogers (3/3) | 14,050 |
| Friday, 16 July | Round 19 | Brisbane Broncos | Skilled Park | 10 – 24 | Rogers, Thompson | Rogers (1/2) | 26,197 |
| Friday, 23 July | Round 20 | St George Illawarra Dragons | WIN Jubilee Oval | 11 – 10 | Gordon, Laffranchi | Prince (1/2), Rogers (FG) | 12,668 |
| Sunday, 1 August | Round 21 | New Zealand Warriors | Mt Smart Stadium | 28 – 20 | Michaels (2), Rogers (2), Zillman | Prince (4/5), Rogers (0/1) | 12,017 |
| Friday, 6 August | Round 22 | Parramatta Eels | Skilled Park | 34 – 12 | Minichello (2), Thompson (2), Rogers, Gordon | Prince (5/6) | 19,568 |
| Saturday, 14 August | Round 23 | North Queensland Cowboys | Skilled Park | 37 – 18 | Michaels (2), Prince, Friend, Bailey, Minichello | Prince (6/6) & (FG) | 14,032 |
| Monday, 23 August | Round 24 | Sydney Roosters | Sydney Football Stadium | 23 – 14 | Toopi (2), Gordon, Thompson | Prince (3/4) & (FG) | 9,113 |
| Saturday, 28 August | Round 25 | Cronulla-Sutherland Sharks | Toyota Stadium | 16 – 30 | Thompson (2), Atkins | Prince (2/3) | 10,116 |
| Friday, 3 September | Round 26 | Wests Tigers | Skilled Park | 21 – 18 | Harrison, Zillman, Gordon | Prince (4/4), Rogers (FG) | 26,103 |
Legend: Win Loss Draw Bye

=== Finals ===
Qualifying finals
1 | St. George Illawarra | 28
8 | Manly | 0
2 | Penrith | 22
7 | Canberra | 24
3 | Wests | 15
6 | Sydney | 19
4 | Gold Coast | 28
5 | New Zealand | 16

Semifinals
4W | Canberra | 24
2L | Wests | 26
3W | Sydney | 34
1L | Penrith | 12

Preliminary finals
1W | St. George Illawarra | 13
Wests | 12
2W | Gold Coast | 6
Sydney | 32

Final
St. George Illawarra | 32
Sydney | 8

| Date | Round | Opponent | Venue | Score | Tries | Goals | Attendance |
|---|---|---|---|---|---|---|---|
| Friday, 10 September | Qualifying Final | New Zealand Warriors | Skilled Park | 28 – 16 | Zillman (2), Toopi, Rogers, Gordon | Prince (4/6) | 27,026 |
| Friday, 24 September | Preliminary Final | Sydney Roosters | Suncorp Stadium | 6 – 32 | Zillman | Prince (1/1) | 44,787 |
Legend: Win Loss

== Statistics ==
| Player | Position | Tries | Try Assists | Metres | Tackles | Hit-Ups | Line Breaks | Line Break Assists | Errors | Offloads |
|---|---|---|---|---|---|---|---|---|---|---|
| Luke Bailey | Prop | 16 | | 237 | 0 | 0 | 2 | 0 | | |
| Greg Bird | Five-Eight | 0 | 0 | 198 | 32 | 7 | 0 | 0 | 5 | 5 |
| Riley Brown | Hooker | 0 | 0 | 25 | 14 | 2 | 0 | 0 | 0 | 0 |
| Preston Campbell | Fullback | 1 | 2 | 48 | 4 | 0 | 0 | 0 | 1 | 0 |
| Nathan Friend | Hooker | 0 | 2 | 43 | 90 | 0 | 0 | 1 | 0 | 0 |
| Kevin Gordon | Wing | 3 | 0 | 246 | 3 | 0 | 1 | 0 | 0 | 1 |
| Ashley Harrison | Lock | 0 | 0 | 209 | 62 | 18 | 0 | 0 | 2 | 1 |
| Anthony Laffranchi | Second Row | 2 | 0 | 192 | 73 | 20 | 2 | 0 | 2 | 1 |
| Will Matthews | Prop | 0 | 0 | 41 | 10 | 3 | 0 | 0 | 0 | 1 |
| David Mead | Wing | 1 | 0 | 271 | 11 | 0 | 1 | 0 | 1 | 1 |
| Brad Meyers | Prop | 0 | 0 | 174 | 60 | 16 | 0 | 0 | 1 | 0 |
| Mark Minichiello | Second Row | 0 | 0 | 174 | 36 | 20 | 0 | 0 | 2 | 1 |
| Scott Prince | Half back | 1 | 3 | 78 | 37 | 0 | 0 | 2 | 2 | 4 |
| Mat Rogers | Centre | 0 | 1 | 138 | 22 | 0 | 0 | 1 | 3 | 2 |
| Sam Tagataese | Second Row | 0 | 0 | 78 | 19 | 9 | 0 | 0 | 2 | 5 |
| Bodene Thompson | Prop | 0 | 0 | 142 | 36 | 9 | 0 | 0 | 1 | 1 |
| Joe Tomane | Centre | 2 | 1 | 269 | 18 | 3 | 1 | 1 | 2 | 2 |
| Matthew White | Prop | 0 | 0 | 84 | 23 | 11 | 0 | 0 | 2 | 1 |
| William Zillman | Fullback | 1 | 0 | 128 | 2 | 1 | 1 | 0 | 0 | 0 |

== Representative honours ==
The following players have played a representative match during the 2010 NRL Season.

Australian Kangaroos

- Greg Bird

Indigenous All Stars

- Greg Bird
- Scott Prince

NRL All Stars

- Luke Bailey

NSW Country Origin

- Greg Bird
- Anthony Laffranchi

NSW City Origin

- Mark Minichiello
- John Cartwright (Coach)

NSW Blues

- Greg Bird

QLD Maroons

- Ashley Harrison
