= 2010 Canterbury-Bankstown Bulldogs season =

Canterbury-Bankstown Bulldogs
- 2010 season
- CEO: Todd Greenberg
- Head coach: Kevin Moore
- Captain: Andrew Ryan
- Top try scorer: Club: Ben Barba 14
- Top points scorer: Club: Bryson Goodwin 148
- Highest home attendance: 37,773
- Lowest home attendance: 10,350
- Average home attendance: 18,845

The 2010 Canterbury-Bankstown Bulldogs season was the 76th in the club's history. They competed in the National Rugby League's 2010 Telstra Cup Premiership under coach Kevin Moore. They finished the regular season 13th (out of 16), failing to make the finals.

== Telstra Premiership ==
The club welcomed a new logo and the re-instatement of the "Canterbury-Bankstown" prefix after spending the previous 11 seasons as simply the "Bulldogs". Club record-holder and pointscorer Hazem El Masri had retired at the end of the 2009 season and did not play in 2010.

Former Australian swimming team coach Alan Thompson, a long-time supporter of the Bulldogs, was appointed general manager of the club's football operations on 15 April 2010.

=== Draw and results ===
*From Sunday 5 April at 2am, Australia and NZ daylight saving time ends; all games are in AEST.

Round	Home	Score	Away	Match information
Round	Home	Score	Away	Date and time	Venue
MC	St. George Illawarra Dragons	16–14	Canterbury Bankstown Bulldogs	Sat 20 Feb 2010, 7:30pm AEDT	Wollongong Showground
Trial	Canterbury Bankstown Bulldogs	22–12	Canberra Raiders	Sat 27 Feb 2010, 7:15pm AEDT	Apex Oval, Dubbo
1	Canterbury Bankstown Bulldogs	16–20	Newcastle Knights	Sat 13 March 2010, 5:30pm AEDT	Stadium Australia
2	St. George Illawarra Dragons	26–6	Canterbury Bankstown Bulldogs	Fri 19 March 2010, 7:35pm AEDT	Wollongong Showground
3	Canterbury Bankstown Bulldogs	60–14	Sydney Roosters	Sun 28 Mar 2010, 3:00pm AEDT	Stadium Australia
4	South Sydney Rabbitohs	38–16	Canterbury Bankstown Bulldogs	Mon 5 Apr 2010, 7:00pm AEST	Stadium Australia
5	Canterbury Bankstown Bulldogs	24–30	New Zealand Warriors	Sat 10 Apr 2010, 7:30pm AEST	Stadium Australia
6	Wests Tigers	4–24	Canterbury Bankstown Bulldogs	April 2010	Sydney Football Stadium
7	Canterbury Bankstown Bulldogs	36–18	Brisbane Broncos	April 2010	Stadium Australia
8	Parramatta Eels	26–10	Canterbury Bankstown Bulldogs	April 2010	Stadium Australia
9		BYE
10	Canterbury Bankstown Bulldogs	6–19	St. George Illawarra Dragons	May 2010	Stadium Australia
11	Penrith Panthers	31–16	Canterbury Bankstown Bulldogs	May 2010	Penrith Football Stadium
12	Melbourne Storm	23–12	Canterbury Bankstown Bulldogs	May 2010	Melbourne Rectangular Stadium
13	Canterbury Bankstown Bulldogs	12–19	Wests Tigers	June 2010	Stadium Australia
14		BYE
15	Canterbury Bankstown Bulldogs	24–25	Gold Coast Titans	June 2010	Lang Park
16	Canberra Raiders	10–18	Canterbury Bankstown Bulldogs	June 2010	Canberra Stadium
17	Cronulla-Sutherland Sharks	12–24	Canterbury Bankstown Bulldogs	July 2010	Central Coast Stadium
18	Canterbury Bankstown Bulldogs	20–18	Melbourne Storm	July 2010	Adelaide Oval
19	Sydney Roosters	36–32	Canterbury Bankstown Bulldogs	July 2010	Sydney Football Stadium
20	Canterbury Bankstown Bulldogs	16–32	Parramatta Eels	July 2010	Stadium Australia
21	Canterbury Bankstown Bulldogs	32–12	South Sydney Rabbitohs	July 2010	Stadium Australia
22	Newcastle Knights	30–6	Canterbury Bankstown Bulldogs	August 2010	Newcastle International Sports Centre
23	Canterbury Bankstown Bulldogs	14–28	Canberra Raiders	August 2010	Stadium Australia
24	North Queensland Cowboys	20–22	Canterbury Bankstown Bulldogs	August 2010	The Willows
25	Canterbury Bankstown Bulldogs	18–24	Penrith Panthers	August 2010	Stadium Australia
26	Manly-Warringah Sea Eagles	24–30	Canterbury Bankstown Bulldogs	September 2010	Brookvale Oval

=== Ladder ===
2010 NRL season
Pos.	Team	Pld	W	D	L	B	PF	PA	PD	Pts
1	St. George Illawarra Dragons (P)	24	17	0	7	2	518	299	+219	38
2	Penrith Panthers	24	15	0	9	2	645	489	+156	34
3	Wests Tigers	24	15	0	9	2	537	503	+34	34
4	Gold Coast Titans	24	15	0	9	2	520	498	+22	34
5	New Zealand Warriors	24	14	0	10	2	539	486	+53	32
6	Sydney Roosters	24	14	0	10	2	559	510	+49	32
7	Canberra Raiders	24	13	0	11	2	499	493	+6	30
8	Manly Warringah Sea Eagles	24	12	0	12	2	545	510	+35	28
9	South Sydney Rabbitohs	24	11	0	13	2	584	567	+17	26
10	Brisbane Broncos	24	11	0	13	2	508	535	−27	26
11	Newcastle Knights	24	10	0	14	2	499	569	−70	24
12	Parramatta Eels	24	10	0	14	2	413	491	−78	24
13	Canterbury-Bankstown Bulldogs	24	9	0	15	2	494	539	−45	22
14	Cronulla-Sutherland Sharks	24	7	0	17	2	354	609	−255	18
15	North Queensland Cowboys	24	5	0	19	2	425	667	−242	14
16	Melbourne Storm	24	14	0	10	2	489	363	+126	0^{1}

^{1} Melbourne were deducted eight premiership points and barred from receiving premiership points for the rest of the season due to gross long-term salary cap breaches.

=== Player movements ===
Gains

Player	Previous club
Steve Turner	Melbourne Storm
Blake Green	Cronulla-Sutherland Sharks
Junior Tia-Kilifi	Penrith Panthers
Dene Halatau	Wests Tigers
Corey Payne	Wests Tigers
Mickey Paea	St. George Illawarra Dragons
Trent Hodkinson	Manly-Warringah Sea Eagles
Aiden Tolman	Melbourne Storm
Kris Keating	Parramatta Eels

Losses

Player	Joined Club
Greg Eastwood	Leeds Rhinos
John Kite	Melbourne Storm
Daryl Millard	Wakefield Trinity Wildcats
Hazem El Masri	Retirement
Ben Hannant	Brisbane Broncos

=== Squad ===
The Canterbury Bankstown Bulldogs have signed the below players in first grade to play in the main competition.

No.

Position
Player

Chris Armit – PR Ben Barba – FE Michael Ennis – HK Bryson Goodwin – WG Yileen Gordon – SR Blake Green – HB Dene Halatau – LK Ben Hannant – PR Jarrad Hickey – PR Michael Hodgson – PR Jamal Idris – CE Brett Kimmorley – HB Brad Morrin – SR

No.

Position
Player

Josh Morris – CE Heka Nanai – WG Mickey Paea – SR Luke Patten – FB Ben Roberts – FE Andrew Ryan (Captain) – SR David Stagg – LK Lee Te Maari – SR Junior Tia-Kilifi – WG Steve Turner – WG Gary Warburton – SR Danny Williams – PR Tim Winitana – CE

== See also ==
- List of Canterbury-Bankstown Bulldogs seasons
