= Rhys Pritchard =

Australian rugby league player (born 1987)

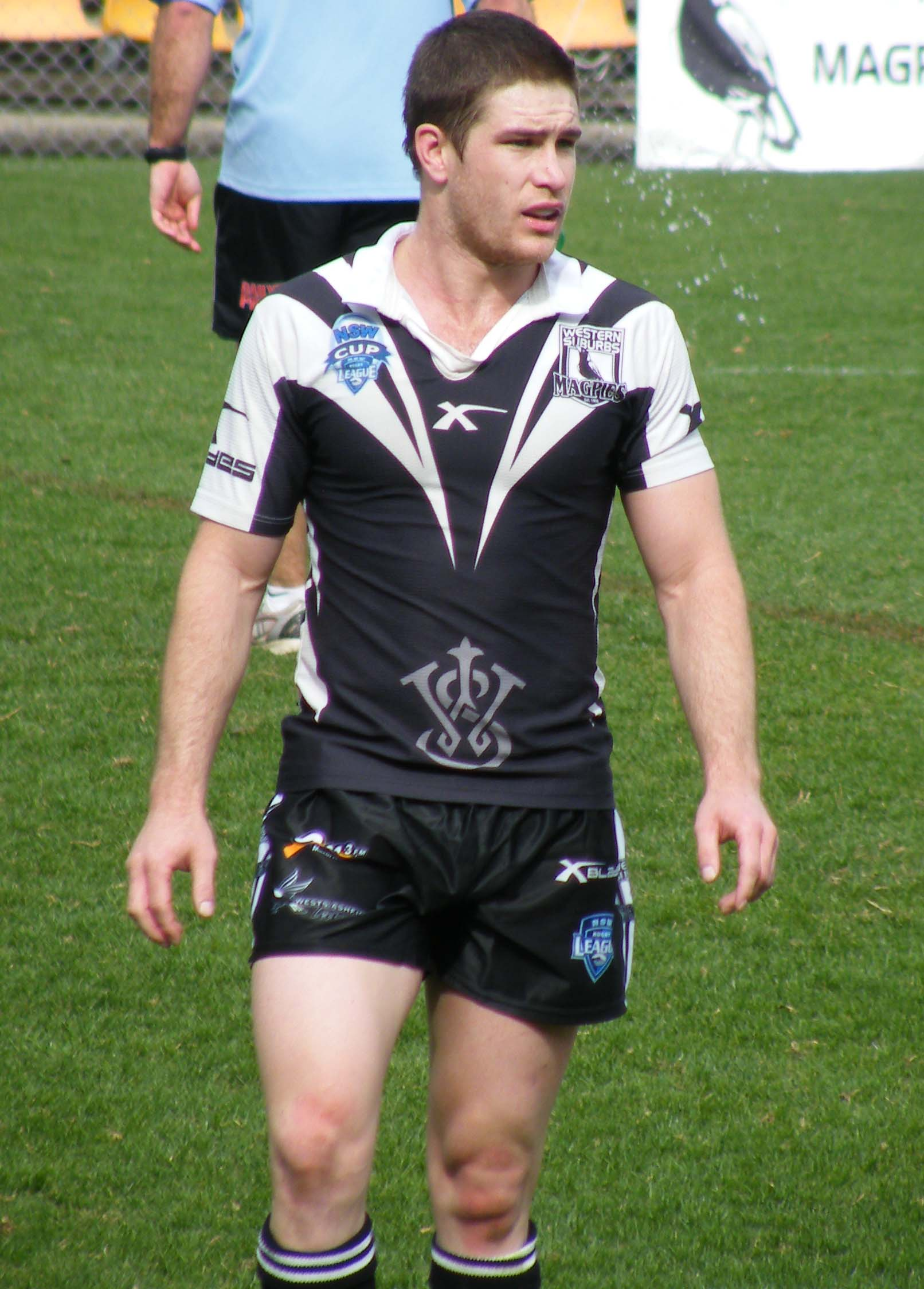

Personal information
- Born: 2 July 1987 (age 39) Sydney, Australia
- Height: 187 cm (6 ft 2 in)
- Weight: 93 kg (14 st 9 lb)

Playing information
- Position: Fullback, Wing, Centre
Club
Years	Team	Pld	T	G	FG	P
2011	Sydney Roosters	2	0	0	0	0

Rhys Pritchard (born 2 July 1987) is an Australian former professional rugby league footballer who previously played for the Sydney Roosters in the National Rugby League. Pritchard also played for the Wests Tigers in the Toyota Cup and The Entrance Tigers in the Bundaberg Red Cup. His preferred position was at fullback.

== Playing career ==
In 2010, he was voted in the NSW Cup team of the year. Pritchard made his first grade debut for the Sydney Roosters in round 13 of the 2011 NRL season against the New Zealand Warriors. He played one further match for the club in round 14 against Melbourne.
