= Curtis Johnston =

Australian rugby league footballer

Personal information
- Full name: Curtis Johnston
- Born: 17 August 1989 (age 36) Darlinghurst, Sydney, New South Wales, Australia

Playing information
- Position: Wing
Club
Years	Team	Pld	T	G	FG	P
2008–14	North Sydney Bears	110	97	0	0	388
2015	Redcliffe Dolphins	47	23	0	0	84
2018–20	North Sydney Bears	21	11	0	0	44
	Total	178	131	0	0	516
- As of 24 Sep 2021

Curtis Johnston is an Australian former professional rugby league footballer who last played for the North Sydney Bears in the Canterbury Cup NSW competition.

== Background ==
Johnston was born in Darlinghurst, Sydney on 17 August 1989 and grew up in Chatswood until the age of 10 when he moved to Berowra in Sydney's far North.

== Playing career ==
=== North Sydney ===
Johnston played 7 seasons of NSW Cup with North Sydney scoring 97 tries over 110 games before moving clubs to Redcliffe Dolphins at the end of 2014 he has scored 23 tries over 47 games with the Dolphins.

Johnston debuted as an 18 year old for North Sydney Bears against Cronulla Cobras in 2008 at the Central Coast Stadium.

He played limited games in 2008 and most with Junior Club Berowra Wallabies in which Johnston won the combined North Sydney/Manly Warringah A-Grade Competition.

In 2011, Johnston was named NSW Cup winger of the year alongside Michael Lett scoring 27 tries in the regular season and called into the NSW Cup Representatives side Vs Qld Residents.

2012 saw Johnston join the club his Grandfather John Sellgren played for in the late 40s early 50s at South Sydney, he played out most of the year with feeder club North Sydney.

In 2013, Johnston fell in trouble with the ASADA (Australian Sports Anti-Doping Authority) after allegations of text messages saying he had admitted to the use of peptides aired on channel 9. Johnston claimed the messages were a joke between friends and was later cleared to resume playing with North Sydney after 8 weeks of investigation. Johnston scored 4 tries in his return game against the Canterbury-Bankstown Bulldogs.

In 2014, Johnston signed with English club Leigh Centurions but was ineligible to play in England.

=== Redcliffe Dolphins ===
This saw Johnston change interstate to Queensland club Redcliffe Dolphins. Johnston did not play there until round 8 of the 2015 season after serving an 11-week suspension from the NSWRL the previous year.

2016 saw Johnston play in his first State League (Qrl Intrust Super Cup) Grand Final against the Burleigh Bears losing 26 to 16.

=== North Sydney (re-join) ===
On 11 May 2018, Johnston re-joined his home club North Sydney.

Johnston brought up his 100th try with Norths against the Blacktown Workers Sea Eagles with a hat trick at North Sydney Oval.

During the 2019 Canterbury Cup NSW season, Johnston announced via his Facebook page that he would be retiring following the conclusion of year. Johnston finished his final season playing in 7 matches and scoring 4 tries. Johnstons finished his career with a total of 108 tries in 131 games for North Sydney.
