= Nigel Plum =

Australian rugby league footballer

Personal information
- Born: 31 March 1983 (age 43) Wagga Wagga, New South Wales, Australia

Playing information
- Height: 187 cm (6 ft 2 in)
- Weight: 104 kg (16 st 5 lb)
- Position: Second-row, Prop, Lock
Club
Years	Team	Pld	T	G	FG	P
2005–06	Sydney Roosters	25	1	0	0	4
2007–09	Canberra Raiders	33	3	0	0	12
2010–15	Penrith Panthers	92	3	0	0	12
	Total	150	7	0	0	28

Nigel Plum is an Australian former professional rugby league footballer. He played for the Sydney Roosters, Canberra Raiders and Penrith Panthers in the National Rugby League. He was known for his tackling technique.

== Playing career ==
Plum made his first grade debut for the Sydney Roosters against South Sydney in round 1 of the 2005 NRL season at the Sydney Football Stadium.

Plum was granted a release from his contract with the Sydney Roosters in 2007 and immediately signed with the Canberra Raiders. In the 2008 NRL season, Plum played in Canberra's elimination final loss to Cronulla-Sutherland.

On 24 September 2009 it was announced that Plum had signed with the Penrith Panthers, but his first season with the Panthers was limited by numerous injuries and Plum was restricted to performances in the Penrith Panthers' NSW Cup feeder side the Windsor Wolves. Plum returned to first grade in 2011 and was voted Big League Magazine's Hardest Hitter.

In the 2014 NRL season, Plum played nearly every match for Penrith as the club qualified for the finals and made it to within game of the 2014 NRL Grand Final but were defeated by Canterbury in the preliminary final at ANZ Stadium.

On 15 August 2015, Plum announced his retirement from the NRL effective immediately after the Panthers' round 23 win over the New Zealand Warriors. The round 23 win also marked his 150th NRL game.

== Post playing ==
In 2018, Plum was working in Griffith with the Clontarf Foundation.

== Statistics ==
Year	Team	Games	Tries	Pts
2005	Sydney Roosters	7		
2006	Sydney Roosters	14	1	4
2007	Sydney Roosters	4		
2007	Canberra Raiders	7		
2008	Canberra Raiders	13	1	4
2009	Canberra Raiders	13	2	8
2010	Penrith Panthers	4		
2011	Penrith Panthers	20	1	4
2012	Penrith Panthers	13		
2013	Penrith Panthers	18	1	4
2014	Penrith Panthers	23	1	4
2015	Penrith Panthers	14		
	Totals	150	7	28
