= 2010 Sydney Roosters season =

- NRL rank: 6th
- 2010 record: Wins: 14; draws: 0; losses: 10
- Points scored: For: 355 (50tries, 39goals, 1fieldgoal); against: 354 (50tries, 37goals)

Team information
- CEO: Steve Noyce
- Coach: Brian Smith
- Assistant coach: Trent Robinson, Rohan Smith
- Captain: Braith Anasta
- Stadium: Sydney Football Stadium

Top scorers
- Tries: Shaun Kenny-Dowall 21
- Goals: Todd Carney 72
- Points: Todd Carney 201
| ← 2009 | 2011 → |

The 2010 Sydney Roosters season was the 103rd in the club's history. Having finished with the 'wooden-spoon' (last) in 2009 they competed in the National Rugby League's 2010 Telstra Premiership, finishing 6th (out of 16). The Roosters went on to play in the 2010 NRL Grand Final, losing to the St. George Illawarra Dragons.

== Pre-season ==
The Sydney Roosters pre-season schedule begun with a "thank you" testimonial for Todd Carney the club that kept him playing Rugby League, the Atherton Roosters. A match was also scheduled against the New Zealand Warriors in Rotorua one day later. Coach Brian Smith sent a 22-man squad to each destination, with Smith and one of his assistant coaches, Rohan Smith heading to Rotorua and his other assistant coach Trent Robinson taking the other 22-man squad to Atherton.

The team that headed to Atherton won quite convincingly. This match saw Todd Carney score 6 points in the 68-18 win for the Roosters, in which JP Du Plessis scored a hat-trick including a try from his very first touch of the football. The team that flew out to Rotorua, on the other hand, under the leadership of Anthony Minichiello, had much tougher opposition and were well beaten 26-8 under the watchful eye of almost 10,000 supporters.

The following week, the Sydney Roosters are due to play their annual Foundation Cup match against the Wests Tigers. This will be the fourth edition of the match, with the Roosters being victorious on all of the 3 previous occasions.

The Sydney Roosters pre-season schedule concluded with a win against the Parramatta Eels at Central Coast Stadium.

=== Results ===
| Date | Round | Opponent | Venue | Result | Tries | Goals | F. Goals | Attendance |
|---|---|---|---|---|---|---|---|---|
| 12 February | Trial 1 | Atherton Roosters | NQ Hardware Stadium, Atherton | 68 - 18 | Du Plessis (3), Peters, Littlejohn, Unknown (n/a) | Carney (3con), Unknown (n/a) | | 3,000 |
| 13 February | Trial 2 | New Zealand Warriors | Rotorua International Stadium, Rotorua | 8 - 26 | Takairangi, Tuigamala | | | 9,600 |
| 21 February | Foundation Cup | Wests Tigers | Sydney Football Stadium, Sydney | 28 - 10 | Carney, Cherrington, Kenny-Dowall, Perrett | Carney (4con, 2pen) | | 10,281 |
| 27 February | Trial 4 | Parramatta Eels | Central Coast Stadium, Central Coast | 40 - 14 | Minichiello (2), Guerra, Carney, Pearce, Symonds, Tuigamala | Carney (6con) | | 18,111 |

== Regular season ==
=== Results ===
The Roosters' season was highlighted by several periods. Firstly, the Chooks made a bright start winning two from two but were flogged by the Canterbury Bulldogs and during the middle of the season the Roosters seemed destined to continue with a win–loss-win-loss pattern. They also won five in a row towards the end of the season, then lost three before coming back to convincingly beat Manly, 30-14. Despite a clear run through the finals, including the almighty 100 minute epic against the Tigers, they lost the Grand Final, 32-8, against St. George Illawarra.

| Date | Round | Opponent | Venue | Result | Tries | Goals | F. Goals | Attendance |
|---|---|---|---|---|---|---|---|---|
| 14, 15 Mar:00 | Round 1 | South Sydney Rabbitohs | ANZ Stadium, Sydney | 36 - 10 | Pearce (2), Kenny Dowall (2), Guerra, Perrett | Carney (5con, 1pen) | | 23,149 |
| 21, 15 Mar:00 | Round 2 | Wests Tigers | Sydney Football Stadium, Sydney | 44 - 32 | Graham (2), Pearce (2), Guerra (2), Minichiello, Aubusson | Carney (6con) | | 19,021 |
| 28, 15 Mar:00 | Round 3 | Canterbury-Bankstown Bulldogs | ANZ Stadium, Sydney | 14 - 60 | Anasta, Pearce, Jones | Carney (1con) | | 19,738 |
| 2, 20 Apr:35 | Round 4 | Brisbane Broncos | Sydney Football Stadium, Sydney | 25 - 6 | Aubusson, Carney (2), Minichiello | Carney (4con) | Carney (1fieldgoal) | 17,106 |
| 11, 15 Apr:00 | Round 5 | Penrith Panthers | CUA Stadium, Penrith | 6 - 28 | Aubusson | Carney (1con) | | 14,023 |
| 17, 19 Apr:30 | Round 6 | Canberra Raiders | Sydney Football Stadium, Sydney | 36 - 6 | Carney (2), Minichiello, Kenny Dowall, Kouparitsas, Nuuausala | Carney (4con) Anasta (2con) | | 9,308 |
| 25, 16 Apr:00 | Round 7 | St. George Illawarra Dragons | Sydney Football Stadium, Sydney | 6 - 28 | Aubusson | Carney (1pen) | | 36,213 |
| 2, 14 May:00 | Round 8 | Wests Tigers | Campbelltown Stadium, Campbelltown | 12 - 8 | Nuuausala, Carney | Carney (2con) | | 19,901 |
| 10, 19 May:00 | Round 9 | North Queensland Cowboys | Sydney Football Stadium, Sydney | 14 - 32 | Kouparitsas, Carney, Graham | Carney (1con) | | 6,478 |
| 15, 19 May:30 | Round 10 | Newcastle Knights | Bluetongue Stadium, Central Coast | 18 - 34 | Aubusson, Anasta, Minichiello | Carney (3con) | | 10,018 |
| | Round 11 | BYE | | | | | | |
| 31, 19 May:00 | Round 12 | Gold Coast Titans | Skilled Park, Gold Coast | 30 - 16 | Kenny Dowall (2), Nuuausala (2), Anasta, Minichiello | Carney (3con) | | 13,235 |
| 5, 19 Jun:30 | Round 13 | Cronulla-Sutherland Sharks | Sydney Football Stadium, Sydney | 18-42 | Graham, Kenny Dowall, Carney | Carney (3con) | | 7,934 |
| 14, 19 Jun:00 | Round 14 | Melbourne Storm | AAMI Park, Melbourne | 38-6 | Masoe, Graham (2), Linnett, Minichiello, Nuuausala, Perrett | Carney (5con) | | 10,449 |
| | Round 15 | BYE | | | | | | |
| 27, 16 Jun:00 | Round 16 | New Zealand Warriors | AMI Stadium Christchurch | 18 - 20 | Pearce, Carney, Kenny-Dowall | Carney (3con) | | 20,721 |
| 4, 14 Jul:00 | Round 17 | Canberra Raiders | Canberra Stadium, Canberra | 22 - 12 | Carney, Perrett, Kenny-Dowall, Friend | Carney (3con) | | 10,767 |
| 9, 19 Jul:35 | Round 18 | South Sydney Rabbitohs | Sydney Football Stadium, Sydney | 18 - 14 | Aubusson, Carney, Perrett | Carney (3con) | | 18,424 |
| 18, 15 Jul:00 | Round 19 | Canterbury-Bankstown Bulldogs | Sydney Football Stadium, Sydney | 36 - 32 | Leilua (2), Carney (2), Minichiello, Aubusson | Carney(6con) | | 19,129 |
| 26, 19 Jul:00 | Round 20 | Brisbane Broncos | Suncorp Stadium, Brisbane | 34 - 30 | Kenny-Dowall (4), Carney, Leilua | Carney(5con) | | 26,486 |
| 31, 17 Jul:30 | Round 21 | Parramatta Eels | Parramatta Stadium, Parramatta | 48 - 12 | Aubusson, Kenny-Dowall, Minichiello (2), Graham (2), Linnett, Nuuausala | Carney(8con) | | 19,824 |
| 8, 15 Aug:00 | Round 22 | St George Illawarra Dragons | Sydney Cricket Ground, Sydney | 12 - 19 | Carney, Minichiello | Carney, (2con) | | 37,994 |
| 13, 19 Aug:35 | Round 23 | Cronulla-Sutherland Sharks | Toyota Stadium, Woolooware | 12 - 18 | Anasta, Kenny-Dowall | Carney (2con) | | 8,911 |
| 23, 19 Aug:00 | Round 24 | Gold Coast Titans | Sydney Football Stadium, Sydney | 14 - 23 | Kenny-Dowall, Minichiello, Anasta | Carney (1con) | | 9,113 |
| 29, 15 Aug:00 | Round 25 | Manly-Warringah Sea Eagles | Sydney Football Stadium, Sydney | 30 - 14 | Kenny-Dowall (3), Carney, Perrett | Carney (4con, 1pen) | | 18,962 |
| 4, 19 Sep:30 | Round 26 | North Queensland Cowboys | Dairy Farmers Stadium, Townsville | 18 - 8 | Kenny Dowall (2), Pearce | Carney (3con) | | 12,033 |

=== Standings ===
2010 NRL season
| Pos. | Team | Pld | W | D | L | B | PF | PA | PD | Pts |
|---|---|---|---|---|---|---|---|---|---|---|
| 1 | St. George Illawarra Dragons (P) | 24 | 17 | 0 | 7 | 2 | 518 | 299 | +219 | 38 |
| 2 | Penrith Panthers | 24 | 15 | 0 | 9 | 2 | 645 | 489 | +156 | 34 |
| 3 | Wests Tigers | 24 | 15 | 0 | 9 | 2 | 537 | 503 | +34 | 34 |
| 4 | Gold Coast Titans | 24 | 15 | 0 | 9 | 2 | 520 | 498 | +22 | 34 |
| 5 | New Zealand Warriors | 24 | 14 | 0 | 10 | 2 | 539 | 486 | +53 | 32 |
| 6 | Sydney Roosters | 24 | 14 | 0 | 10 | 2 | 559 | 510 | +49 | 32 |
| 7 | Canberra Raiders | 24 | 13 | 0 | 11 | 2 | 499 | 493 | +6 | 30 |
| 8 | Manly Warringah Sea Eagles | 24 | 12 | 0 | 12 | 2 | 545 | 510 | +35 | 28 |
| 9 | South Sydney Rabbitohs | 24 | 11 | 0 | 13 | 2 | 584 | 567 | +17 | 26 |
| 10 | Brisbane Broncos | 24 | 11 | 0 | 13 | 2 | 508 | 535 | −27 | 26 |
| 11 | Newcastle Knights | 24 | 10 | 0 | 14 | 2 | 499 | 569 | −70 | 24 |
| 12 | Parramatta Eels | 24 | 10 | 0 | 14 | 2 | 413 | 491 | −78 | 24 |
| 13 | Canterbury-Bankstown Bulldogs | 24 | 9 | 0 | 15 | 2 | 494 | 539 | −45 | 22 |
| 14 | Cronulla-Sutherland Sharks | 24 | 7 | 0 | 17 | 2 | 354 | 609 | −255 | 18 |
| 15 | North Queensland Cowboys | 24 | 5 | 0 | 19 | 2 | 425 | 667 | −242 | 14 |
| 16 | Melbourne Storm | 24 | 14 | 0 | 10 | 2 | 489 | 363 | +126 | 0^{1} |

^{1} Melbourne were deducted eight premiership points and barred from receiving premiership points for the rest of the season due to gross long-term salary cap breaches.

== Kit and Sponsors ==
=== Steggles ===
The Sydney Roosters reaffirmed their 'New Beginning' motto by announcing their new major sponsor, Steggles. As a part of the agreement, the clubs 'New Attitude' of Community Engagement would be embraced through a new initiative, the Charity Nest. The three-year deal could see up to $250,000 donated to charities in the 2010 season.

For every point the Sydney Roosters beat their opposition by in the 2010 season, Steggles would donate $1,000 to Charity Nest, with an extra $250 contributed by the Roosters.

== Player Summary ==
| Sydney Roosters 2010 | Appearance | Interchange | Tries | Goals | F/G | Points |
|---|---|---|---|---|---|---|
| Braith Anasta | 27 | - | 9 | 2 | 1 | 41 |
| James Aubusson | 6 | 4 | 1 | - | - | 4 |
| Mitchell Aubusson | 26 | - | 8 | - | - | 32 |
| Jason Baitieri | - | 1 | - | - | - | 0 |
| Sam Brunton | 1 | 2 | - | - | - | 0 |
| Todd Carney | 28 | - | 16 | 95 | 1 | 255 |
| Daniel Conn | 2 | 21 | 1 | - | - | 4 |
| Daniel Fepuleai | - | 1 | - | - | - | 0 |
| Jonathan Ford | 2 | - | - | - | - | 0 |
| Jake Friend | 14 | 5 | 1 | - | - | 4 |
| Phil Graham | 23 | - | 8 | - | - | 32 |
| Aidan Guerra | 6 | 3 | 3 | - | - | 12 |
| Ben Jones | 4 | 1 | 1 | - | - | 4 |
| Martin Kennedy | - | 15 | - | - | - | 0 |
| Shaun Kenny-Dowall | 28 | - | 21 | - | - | 84 |
| Nick Kouparitsas | 8 | 15 | 2 | - | - | 8 |
| Joseph Leilua | 10 | 7 | 3 | - | - | 12 |
| Kane Linnett | 13 | - | 4 | - | - | 16 |
| Mose Masoe | 7 | 5 | 1 | - | - | 4 |
| Anthony Minichiello | 26 | - | 12 | - | - | 0 |
| Nate Myles | 24 | - | - | - | - | 0 |
| Frank-Paul Nuuausala | 22 | 6 | 7 | - | - | 32 |
| Lopini Paea | 9 | 3 | - | - | - | 0 |
| Mitchell Pearce | 22 | - | 9 | - | - | 36 |
| Sam Perrett | 27 | - | 9 | - | - | 36 |
| Jason Ryles | 22 | 4 | - | - | - | 0 |
| Tom Symonds | 2 | 3 | - | - | - | 0 |
| Brad Takairangi | - | 2 | - | - | - | 0 |
| Jared Waerea-Hargreaves | 5 | 14 | - | - | - | 0 |
| Total | 372 | 112 | 114 | 97 | 2 | 652 |
