= Tuigamala =

Tuigamala is a surname. Notable people with the surname include:

- Fesolai Apulu Tuigamala (fl. 2021), Samoan politician
- Sonny Tuigamala (born 1988), Australian rugby league footballer
- Va'aiga Tuigamala (1969–2022), Samoan rugby footballer
