= 2010 NRL Grand Final =

2010 national rugby league match

| St George Illawarra Dragons | Sydney Roosters |
|---|---|
| 32 | 8 |
| | 1 | 2 | Total |
|---|---|---|---|
| SGI | 6 | 26 | 32 |
| SYD | 8 | 0 | 8 |
- Date: 3 October 2010
- Stadium: ANZ Stadium
- Location: Sydney, NSW, Australia
- Clive Churchill Medal: Darius Boyd (SGI)
- National anthem: Jessica Mauboy
- Referee: Tony Archer; Shayne Hayne; Paul Holland (Touch Judge); Jeff Younis (Touch Judge)
- Attendance: 82,334

Broadcast partners
- Broadcasters: Nine Network
- Commentators: Ray Warren; Peter Sterling; Phil Gould

The 2010 NRL Grand Final was the conclusive and premiership-deciding game of the 2010 NRL season. Played on Sunday, 3 October at Sydney's ANZ Stadium, the match was contested by the St. George Illawarra Dragons and the Sydney Roosters. It was the first time the two sides met in a grand final. They had played each other twice before during the season, with St. George Illawarra winning on both occasions. St. George Illawarra finished the season as minor premiers as they had the previous season. The Roosters were the previous year's wooden-spooners and only after playing and winning for five consecutive weeks were able to reach the 2010 decider.

In the grand final, St. George Illawarra trailed by two points at halftime, but broke the shackles in the second half, keeping the Roosters scoreless while adding 26 points to their score. The game finished with a 24-point margin in favour of St. George Illawarra, claiming their first premiership as a joint-venture club.

== Background ==
The 2010 NRL season was the 103rd season of professional rugby league football club competition in Australia, and the thirteenth run by the National Rugby League. The season commenced on 12 March with sixteen teams competing for the 2010 Telstra Premiership whilst the third season of the National Youth Competition was also in progress. The 2010 season was marred by the Melbourne Storm's admission in April of systematically breaching the salary cap. As part of the NRL's imposed penalties, the Storm were deducted all 8 competition points earned at the time of the announcement, and were barred from receiving points for the rest of the season, guaranteeing them the wooden spoon.

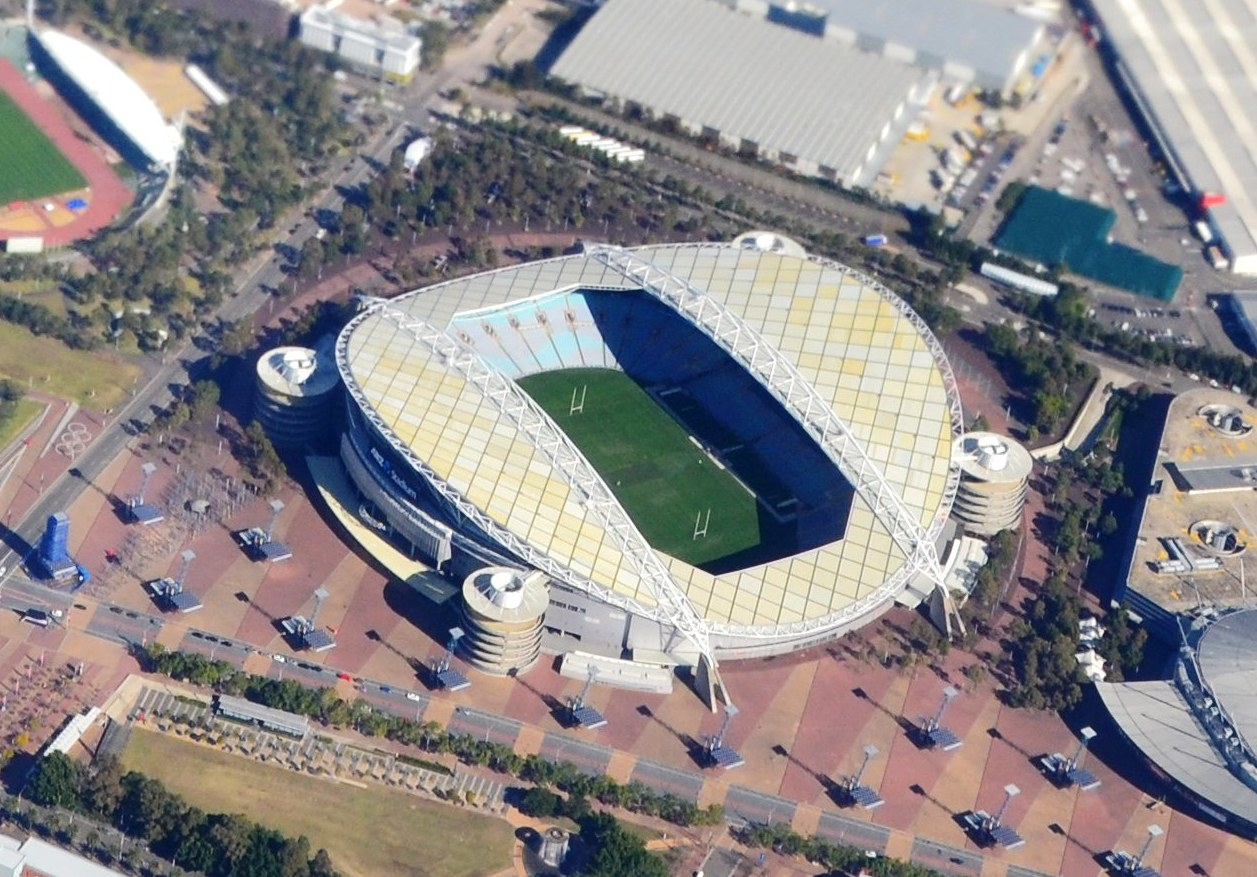
ANZ Stadium, where the match was played

| | Dragons | Roosters |
|---|---|---|
| Rd.1 | Eels | Rabbitohs |
| Rd.2 | Bulldogs | Tigers |
| Rd.3 | Cowboys | Bulldogs |
| Rd.4 | Storm | Broncos |
| Rd.5 | Broncos | Panthers |
| Rd.6 | Titans | Raiders |
| Rd.7 | Roosters | Dragons |
| Rd.8 | Cronulla | Tigers |
| Rd.9 | Sea Eagles | Cowboys |
| Rd.10 | Bulldogs | Knights |
| Rd.11 | Raiders | Bye |
| Rd.12 | Eels | Titans |
| Rd.13 | Warriors | Sharks |
| Rd.14 | Bye | Storm |
| Rd.15 | Sharks | Bye |
| Rd.16 | Tigers | Warriors |
| Rd.17 | Panthers | Raiders |
| Rd.18 | Bye | Rabbitohs |
| Rd.19 | Rabbitohs | Bulldogs |
| Rd.20 | Titans | Broncos |
| Rd.21 | Broncos | Eels |
| Rd.22 | Roosters | Dragons |
| Rd.23 | Sea Eagles | Sharks |
| Rd.24 | Raiders | Titans |
| Rd.25 | Knights | Sea Eagles |
| Rd.26 | Rabbitohs | Cowboys |
| QF | Sea Eagles | Tigers |
| SF | DNP | Panthers |
| PF | Tigers | Titans |
Key: Win Loss

=== St. George Illawarra Dragons ===
St. George Illawarra qualified for the Grand Final having defeated the Manly-Warringah Sea Eagles and the Wests Tigers in the finals series. The club had finished the regular season as minor premiers for the second consecutive season. St. George Illawarra suffered a poor record in finals matches, having been knocked out of the finals series in straight sets in 2009, and having qualified for a Grand Final only once (in 1999, their first year as a joint venture) in eight finals appearances since the joint venture came into existence. It had been 31 years since the St. George Dragons side of the joint venture last won a premiership, while the Illawarra Steelers club had never won a premiership or qualified for a Grand Final.

=== Sydney Roosters ===
The Sydney Roosters entered the Grand Final from a markedly different path to that of the Dragons. The Roosters had finished the 2009 season on the bottom of the ladder. Under new coach Brian Smith, and having signed troubled star Todd Carney, the Roosters improved to finish sixth on the ladder in 2010, before consecutive finals series victories against the Wests Tigers, the Penrith Panthers and the Gold Coast Titans launched the club into the Grand Final. The Sydney Roosters were thus in a position where they could become the first club since the Western Suburbs Magpies in 1934 to win a premiership after finishing last in the previous season.

== Grand final day schedule ==
Australian rock band You Am I headlined the pre-match entertainment, which also featured Jessica Mauboy, Australian dance act Justice Crew, an ensemble of the Sydney Children's Choir, the Gondwana National Indigenous Children's Choir and the Glebe Public School Choir and a tribute to the NRL's retiring players. The 21 Australian soldiers killed in the war in Afghanistan also received a tribute that concluded with the traditional arrival of a Blackhawk helicopter.

- 11:45am Gates Open
- 12:00pm NSW Cup Grand Final Kick Off – Canterbury-Bankstown Bulldogs v Windsor Wolves
- 1:45pm NSW Cup Grand Final official presentation
- 2:00pm Toyota Cup Grand Final Kick Off – South Sydney Rabbitohs v New Zealand Warriors
- 3:15pm Coin Toss
- 3:50pm Toyota Cup Grand Final official presentation
- 4:25pm Telstra Premiership Grand Final teams highlight package
- 4:36pm Presentation to 300-game and Retiring Players
- 4:45pm Ken Stephen Medalist, Andrew Ryan, and Toyota National Volunteer of the Year, Greg Carey, deliver Telstra Premiership Grand Final Trophy via the Telstra Child Flight helicopter
- 4:50pm Pre-game entertainment – Justice Crew, Jessica Mauboy and You Am I with Dan Sultan and Phil Jamieson
- 5:18pm National Anthem performed, both in Dharawal indigenous language and in English, by Jessica Mauboy with Sydney Children's Choir, Gondwana National Indigenous Children's Choir and Glebe Public School Choir
- 5:20pm 2010 Telstra Premiership Grand Final – 1st half – St George Illawarra Dragons v Sydney Roosters
- 6:05pm Blackhawk arrival and Defence tribute
- 6:20pm 2010 Telstra Premiership Grand Final – 2nd half
- 7:03pm Telstra Premiership Grand Final official presentation

== Match details ==
The Grand Final commenced at approximately 5.15pm, following the grand finals of the NSW Cup between Windsor Wolves and Canterbury-Bankstown Bulldogs and the Toyota Cup between South Sydney Rabbitohs and New Zealand Warriors. The weather was overcast, 13 degrees Celsius, with light rain which meant the two earlier matches had caused the centre of the field to become muddy. A crowd of 82,334 was in attendance for the match.

=== First half ===
| St. George Illawarra Dragons | Posit. | Sydney Roosters |
|---|---|---|
| 1. Darius Boyd | FB | 1. Anthony Minichiello |
| 2. Brett Morris | WG | 2. Joseph Leilua |
| 3. Mark Gasnier | CE | 3. Kane Linnett |
| 4. Matt Cooper | CE | 4. Shaun Kenny-Dowall |
| 5. Jason Nightingale | WG | 5. Sam Perrett |
| 6. Jamie Soward | 5/8th | 6. Todd Carney |
| 7. Ben Hornby (c) | HB | 7. Mitchell Pearce |
| 8. Neville Costigan | PR | 8. Jason Ryles |
| 9. Dean Young | HK | 9. Jake Friend |
| 10. Michael Weyman | PR | 20. Lopini Paea |
| 11. Beau Scott | SR | 11. Nate Myles |
| 12. Ben Creagh | SR | 12. Mitchell Aubusson |
| 13. Jeremy Smith | LF | 13. Braith Anasta (c) |
| 14. Nathan Fien | Int. | 10. Frank-Paul Nu'uausala |
| 15. Trent Merrin | Int. | 14. Martin Kennedy |
| 16. Matt Prior | Int. | 15. Jared Waerea-Hargreaves |
| 17. Jarrod Saffy | Int. | 16. Daniel Conn |
| Wayne Bennett | Coach | Brian Smith |

After a sixth-minute penalty to St. George Illawarra helped them up into good field position, Jamie Soward from the ten-metre line kicked the ball over into the Roosters' in-goal and Mark Gasnier, racing through from the right side, leapt to catch it on the full and put it down just inside the dead ball line. The video referee Bill Harrigan awarded the try and Soward's conversion was successful, so St. George Illawarra was leading 6-0 after eight minutes. However, video replays showed that in the lead up to the try, St. George Illawarra winger Brett Morris had passed the ball with a foot outside the touch-line so play should not have been allowed to continue. Later, in the sixteenth minute, the Sydney Roosters had made their way up into better field position when Todd Carney, twenty metres from the opposition try-line's right side, kicked high to the left corner. His winger Joseph Leilua caught the ball, crashed over the try-line, and while attempting to put it down had it knocked from his outstretched hand by Jamie Soward's knee, but Roosters captain Braith Anasta was there to ground it. The video referee was again called upon to award the try, and with Carney's kick going wide the score was 6-4 in favour of the Red & Whites. Less than two minutes after the restart of play St. George Illawarra knocked on in their own half and the Tricolours, after getting within fifteen metres of the try-line, moved the ball through the hands from the left side of the field to the right where Mitchell Aubusson crashed over near the corner. Carney again missed the conversion but his side was now in the lead 8-6 with a quarter of the match gone. In the twenty-sixth minute St. George Illawarra were awarded a penalty in a goal-kicking position but Soward missed. At the thirty-minute mark St. George Illawarra prop Michael Weyman was helped off the field after getting a swinging arm to the head from Daniel Conn which was placed on report. The third quarter of the match was played in both ends of the ground with neither side able to turn their opportunities into points, so the teams left the field with the Sydney Roosters leading 8-6.

=== Second half ===
Less than six minutes after the break and having forced the Sydney Roosters to do a goal-line drop-out, St. George Illawarra got their first try of the half. On the second tackle and twenty metres out, the ball made its way through their hands to right winger Jason Nightingale who stepped around his defender and dove over in the corner. Soward's kick from the sideline added the extra two points, so St. George Illawarra led 12 - 8. The rain had started falling heavily when the Red & Whites scored another similar try, with a long cut-out pass going to ground but Nightingale was able to pick it up and cross in his corner again. Soward again kicked the extras, pushing his side's lead out to 18 - 8 with a quarter of the match remaining. About two minutes later St. George Illawarra had again worked the ball up into an attacking position when Nathan Fien, less than ten metres from the uprights, darted ahead from dummy half before passing to Dean Young who juggled the ball as he crashed through the defence and over the line. The video referee awarded the try 'benefit of the doubt' and with Soward adding the extras the Dragons were now leading 24 - 8. The Roosters, still unable to get the ball out of their danger zone conceded another penalty in front of their posts and Soward added another two points for his team, making it 26 - 8. Further errors from the Tricolours led to another White & Red attacking wave and another close-range try, with Fien pushing through the goal-line defence from dummy half. After another simple kick for Soward, St. George Illawarra lead 32 - 8, and with no more points in the remaining eight minutes this was the full-time score to secure St. George Illawarra their first premiership as a joint-venture side. The premiership also ended 31 years of hurt for St. George fans as the club had previously lost finals in 1985, 1992, 1993, 1996 and 1999.

It was the third time in the 2010 season that St. George Illawarra had trailed the Sydney Roosters at halftime before keeping them scoreless in the second half to win. St. George Illawarra fullback Darius Boyd was judged by Australian selectors to be awarded the Clive Churchill Medal for man of the match. Boyd became the fourth fullback to win the Clive Churchill, after Newcastle's Robbie O'Davis (1997), former Brisbane teammate Darren Lockyer (2000) and Melbourne's Billy Slater (2009). Boyd had a hand in both of Nightingale's tries and made 111 metres from 13 hit-ups. This was Boyd's second premiership win, having won with the Brisbane Broncos in his debut season in 2006.

=== Scoreboard ===
2010 NRL Grand Final

Sunday, 3 October
17:15 AEDT (UTC+11)

| St. George Illawarra Dragons | 32 – 8 | Sydney Roosters |
|---|---|---|
| Tries: 5 Nightingale 46', 60'; Gasnier 8'; Young 63'; Fien 70'; Goals: 6 Soward 9', 47', 61', 64', pen 67', 71' (6/7) | 1st: 6–8; 2nd: 26–0; Report | Tries: 2 Anasta 16'; Aubusson 20'; Goals: 0 Carney (0/2) |

ANZ Stadium, Sydney
Attendance: 82,334
Referees: Tony Archer, Shayne Hayne
Touch judges: Paul Holland, Jeff Younis
Clive Churchill Medal: Darius Boyd (St. George Illawarra)

== Audience ==
Australia's national television audience for the match was over 3.1 million and up on the previous year's decider in Sydney and Brisbane. A further 197,000 people watched the game live in New Zealand.

=== Telecast Details ===
- Australia - Nine Network (live from 5pm AEST with coverage beginning at 12pm) also simulcast on Gem HD. A replay of the game will be played on Fox Sports at 8pm AEST on the same night.
- New Zealand - Sky Sports (live from 6:30pm NZ time), Prime (Delayed Coverage)
- Asia-Pacific - Australia Network (includes China, Hong Kong/Macau, Taiwan, Japan, South Korea, North Korea, Vietnam, Indonesia, Singapore, Thailand, Philippines, Palau, Malaysia, Cambodia, Burma/Myanmar, Laos, Brunei, Fiji, Western Samoa, Tonga, Cook Islands, Tuvalu, East Timor, Vanuatu, New Caledonia, Solomon Islands, Marshall Islands, Nauru, Micronesia, Kiribati)
- Indian subcontinent - Australia Network (includes India, Pakistan, Sri Lanka, Bangladesh, Nepal, Bhutan)
- Ireland and the United Kingdom - Sky Sports (live from 7am), Premier Sports (Delayed Coverage)
- Middle East - Australia Network and ShowSports
- United States - America One (live from 9pm ET/PT)
- Canada- Setanta Sports (Canada) (live)

== 2011 World Club Challenge ==
Having won the NRL grand final, St. George Illawarra had earned the right to play against 2010's Super League XV Champions, the Wigan Warriors in the following February's World Club Challenge, which they won 21-15.
