= Steve Naughton =

Australian rugby league footballer

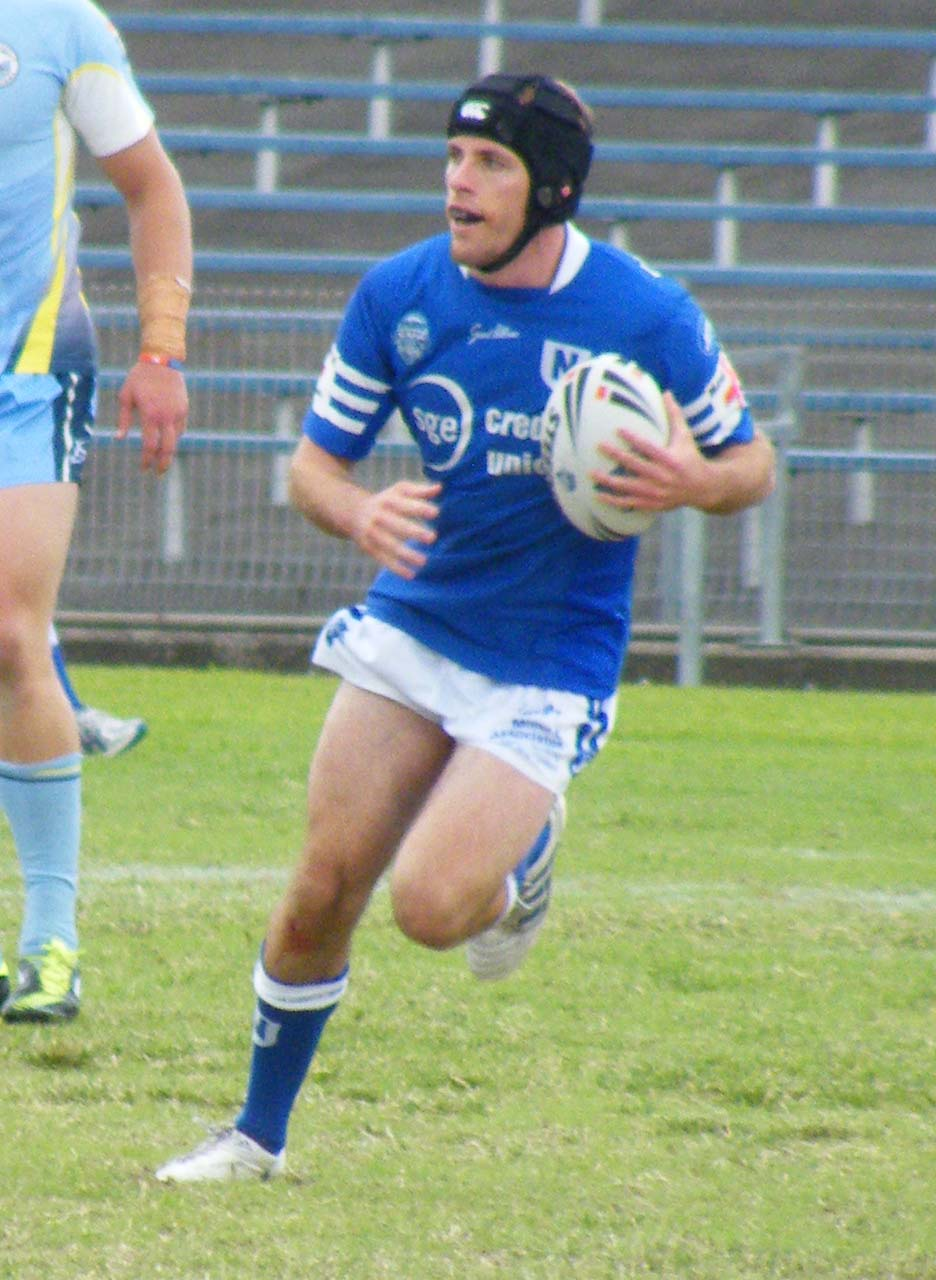

Personal information
- Full name: Steve Naughton
- Born: 30 January 1989 (age 36); Sydney, New South Wales, Australia
- Height: 188 cm (6 ft 2 in)
- Weight: 89 kg (14 st 0 lb)

Playing information
- Position: Wing
Club
Years	Team	Pld	T	G	FG	P
2011	Sydney Roosters	3	0	0	0	0

Steve Naughton is an Australian former professional rugby league footballer who last played for the Yass Magpies in the Canberra Raiders Cup, after five years on the sideline. He last played professionally for the Pia Donkeys in the Elite One Championship in France before making a return with his boyhood club. Naughton previously played with the Sydney Roosters in the National Rugby League as a fullback and halfback. In 2016 he became coach of the Magpies.

== Early life ==
Naughton started playing Rugby League at age five. His junior club was the Yass Magpies.

== Playing career ==
Naughton made his first grade debut in round 10 of the 2011 NRL season against Cronulla. He played two further games for the club. Naughton also played in the NSW Cup for Newtown.

=== Nickname ===
During his time as a Toyota Cup, Naughton was affectionately known as "Cheeseburgers". This nickname is believed to have originated at a Sutton Forest Eatery on the trip back from a Toyota Cup match in Sydney.
