= Phil Graham (rugby league) =

Australian rugby league footballer

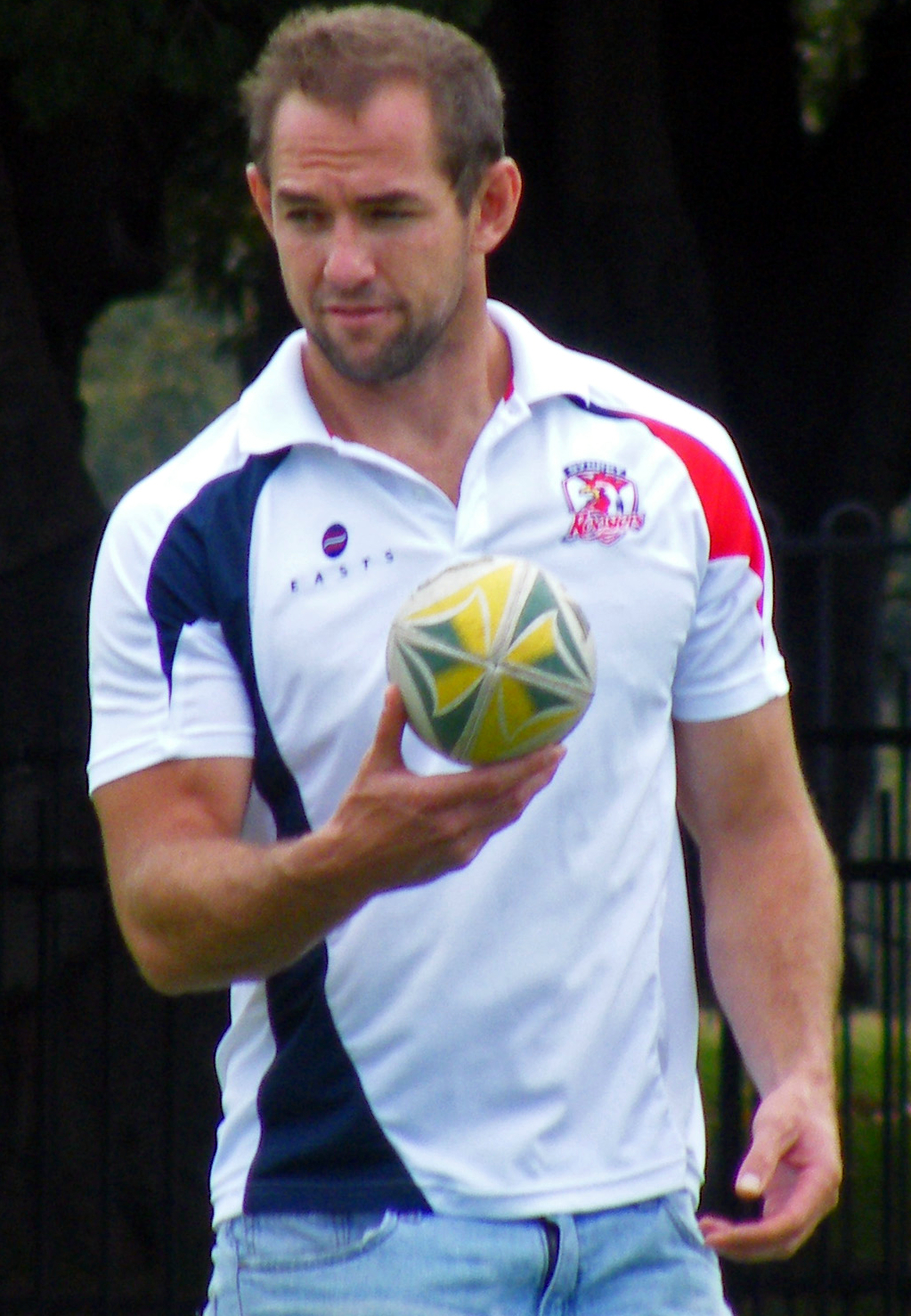

Personal information
- Full name: Phillip Graham
- Born: 21 June 1981 (age 45) Tamworth, New South Wales, Australia

Playing information
- Height: 185 cm (6 ft 1 in)
- Weight: 89 kg (14 st 0 lb)
- Position: Wing, Centre, Fullback
Club
Years	Team	Pld	T	G	FG	P
2002–09	Canberra Raiders	111	68	10	0	292
2010–11	Sydney Roosters	34	11	0	0	44
2012	Gold Coast Titans	2	0	0	0	0
	Total	147	79	10	0	336
Representative
Years	Team	Pld	T	G	FG	P
2007	NSW Country	1	0	0	0	0

Phillip Graham (born 21 June 1981) is an Australian former professional rugby league footballer who played as a centre, winger and fullback for the Canberra Raiders, Sydney Roosters and the Gold Coast Titans in the NRL.

== Playing career ==
Graham played 2 seasons for the Redcliffe Dolphins in the Queensland Cup before being signed by the Canberra Raiders in 2001.

Graham won Canberra's rookie of the year award in 2002. In 2005, he was the Raiders' leading try-scorer. He played for Country in the annual City vs Country match in 2007.

Graham scored 68 tries in 111 games for Canberra. Graham should have had more tries to his name but his career was plagued by injuries. When fit and healthy, Graham was one of the quickest men in the game and had an uncanny knack of scoring long range intercept tries. In round 21, 2009 against Brisbane, Graham scored 4 tries, just one short of equalling the club record.

On Friday 11 September 2009, he agreed to a two-year deal with the Sydney Roosters, becoming new coach Brian Smith's first recruit. Graham played 23 games in his first season at the Sydney Roosters but missed out on playing in the 2010 NRL Grand Final due to injury.

Graham signed with the Gold Coast Titans for the 2012 NRL season. He made his Gold Coast Titans debut against Wests Tigers at Skilled Park in a 15-14 loss. Graham announced his retirement at the end of the 2012 NRL season.
