= Nick Kouparitsas =

Former Greece international rugby league footballer

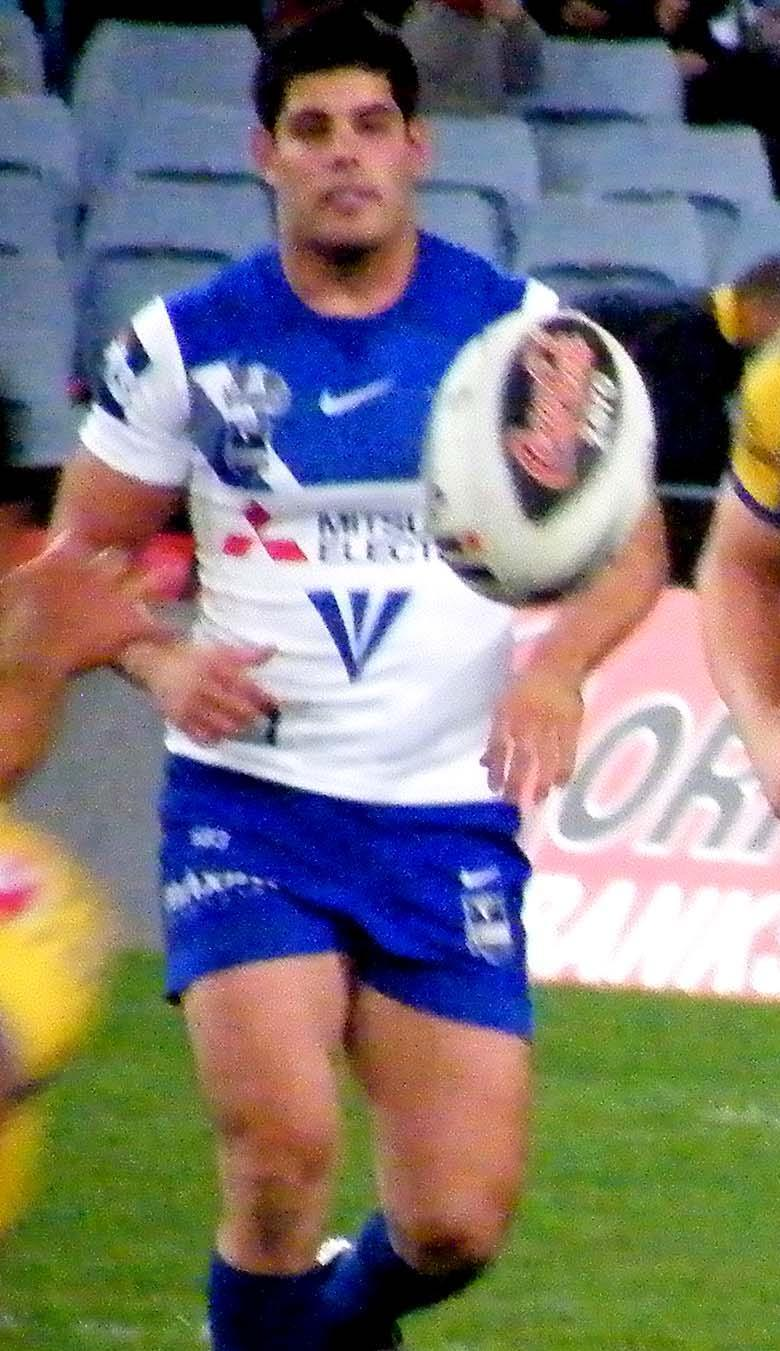

Personal information
- Full name: Nicholas Kouparitsas
- Born: 26 February 1984 (age 41) Canberra, A.C.T., Australia

Playing information
- Height: 184 cm (6 ft 0 in)
- Weight: 103 kg (16 st 3 lb)
- Position: Second-row, Loose forward
Club
Years	Team	Pld	T	G	FG	P
2006–08	Canterbury Bulldogs	34	3	0	0	12
2009–10	Sydney Roosters	31	2	0	0	8
2011	Harlequins RL	16	2	0	0	8
	Total	81	7	0	0	28
Representative
Years	Team	Pld	T	G	FG	P
2003–06	Greece	3	2	0	0	8

Nick Kouparitsas (born 26 February 1984) is a former Greek international rugby league footballer who played in the 2000s and 2010s. A Greece international representative second-row, he played for Canterbury-Bankstown, Sydney Roosters and Harlequins RL.

== Early life ==
Kouparitsas was born in Canberra, Australian Capital Territory, Australia.

== Playing career ==
While attending Daramalan College, Canberra, Kouparitsas played for the Australian Schoolboys team in 2001.

Kouparitsas made his NRL début for Canterbury-Bankstown in 2006, making three NRL appearances in 2006. Kouparitsas became a regular part of the Canterbury first grade team in 2007. Kouparitsas scored his first NRL try on 22 June 2007 against Manly at Brookvale Oval.

In 2009, Kouparitsas spent the beginning of the season playing NSW Cup for Bulldogs' feeder club, the Bankstown City Bulls. As a result of not playing first grade, a release was sought from Canterbury and Kouparitsas signed with the Sydney Roosters prior to round 8. The deal was meant to go ahead weeks earlier, but Canterbury pulled out of the deal. At the conclusion of the 2009 season, Kouparitsas played in two consecutive wooden spoon teams (Canterbury in 2008 and then the Sydney Roosters in 2009). In 2010 he played 24 games mainly starting at hooker or second row where the roosters made the 2010 Nrl Grand Final losing 32–8 to the St. George Illawarra Dragons. This is the highlights of Nicks career. Kouparitsas joined English club Harlequins on a one-year deal for the 2011 Engage Super League season.

== Representative career ==
At an international level, Kouparitsas played for Greece in 2005 in a friendly match against Malta. He also took part in the historic first Rugby League match to take place in Greece, which was played in Athens on 28 October 2006. Greece beat Serbia 44–26, in a match that featured Michael Korkidas, who captained Greece.

== Post playing ==
Kouparitsas is now a real estate agent in Queensland.
