= Foundation Cup =

- Sport: Rugby league
- Inaugural season: 2007
- Ceased: 2013
- Number of teams: 2
- Country: Australia (National Rugby League)
- Cup holders: Sydney Roosters (2013)
- Most titles: Sydney Roosters (6 titles)

The Foundation Cup was a rugby league match contested annually in the National Rugby League between the Sydney Roosters and the Wests Tigers. The Foundation Cup was introduced in 2007 to celebrate the foundation of rugby league in Australia.

== Results ==
Season	Score	Winner	Venue	Attendance
2007	10 – 4	Sydney Roosters	Aussie Stadium	16,198
2008	34 – 28	Sydney Roosters	Sydney Football Stadium	15,197
2009	16 – 12	Sydney Roosters	Sydney Football Stadium	8,716
2010	28 – 10	Sydney Roosters	Sydney Football Stadium	10,281
2011	19 – 8	Wests Tigers	Sydney Football Stadium	6,893
2012	28 – 24	Sydney Roosters	Campbelltown Sports Stadium	7,426
2013	28 – 16	Sydney Roosters	Allianz Stadium	3,800
