= Joseph Leilua =

Samoa international rugby league footballer

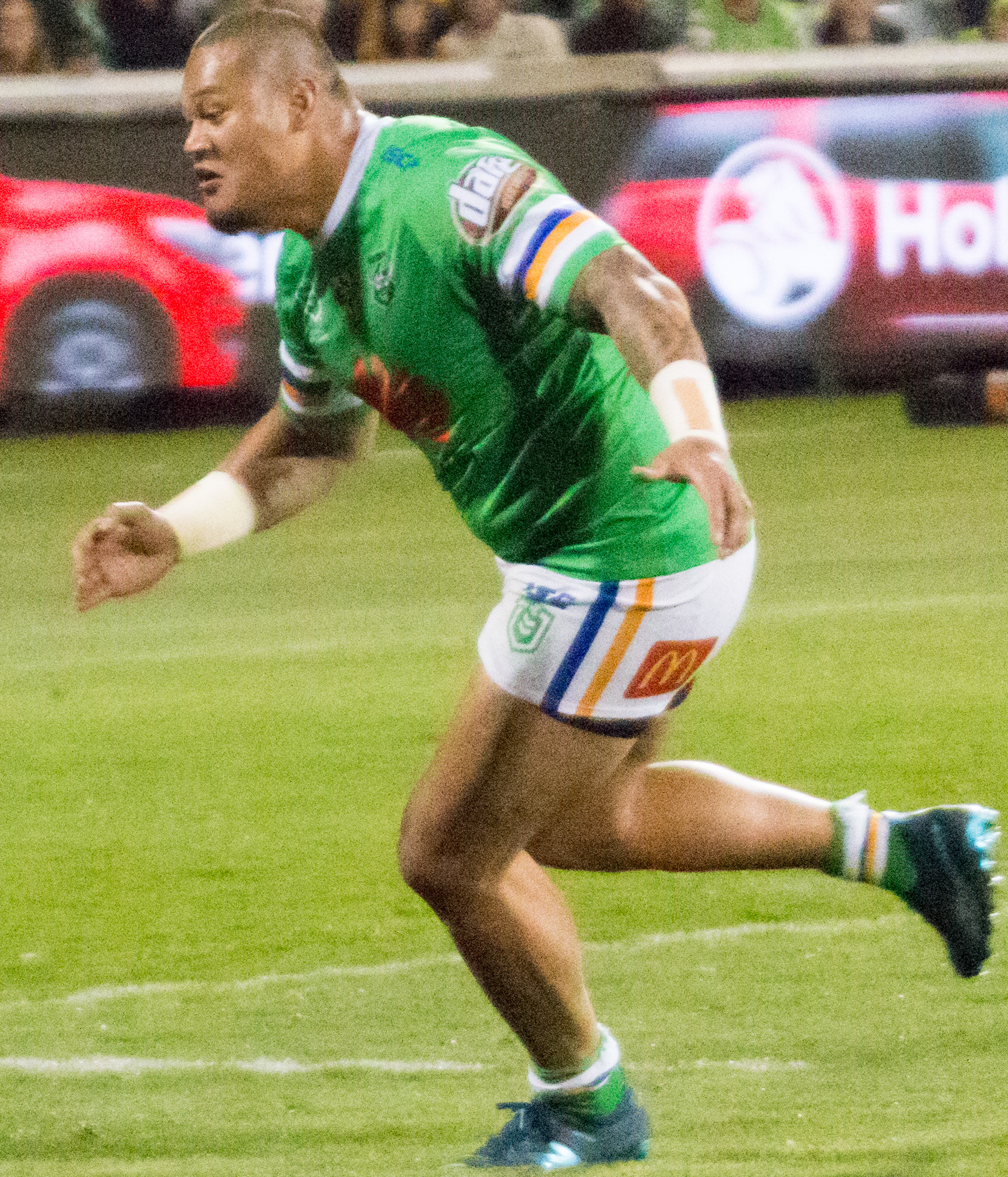
- Leilua in 2019

Personal information
- Born: 12 December 1991 (age 34) Sydney, New South Wales, Australia
- Height: 6 ft 1 in (1.86 m)
- Weight: 16 st 10 lb (106 kg)

Playing information
- Position: Centre, Wing
Club
Years	Team	Pld	T	G	FG	P
2010–12	Sydney Roosters	59	20	0	0	80
2013–15	Newcastle Knights	54	30	0	0	120
2015–19	Canberra Raiders	91	39	0	0	156
2020–21	Wests Tigers	21	6	0	0	24
2022–23	Featherstone Rovers	38	28	0	0	68
	Total	263	123	0	0	448
Representative
Years	Team	Pld	T	G	FG	P
2012	NSW City	1	0	0	0	0
2013–19	Samoa	15	3	0	0	12
2019	Samoa 9s	4	1	0	0	0
- Source: As of 29 November 2023
- Relatives: Luciano Leilua (brother)

Joseph Leilua (born 12 December 1991) is a Samoa international rugby league footballer who plays centre for the Wyong Roos in the Central Coast Division Rugby League.

Leilua previously played for the Sydney Roosters, Newcastle Knights and the Canberra Raiders in the National Rugby League. He played for the City Origin team in 2012, and played as a winger earlier in his career.

== Early years ==
Leilua was born in Sydney, Australia, and is of Samoan descent.

Leilua played his junior rugby league for Hurstville United before being signed by the St. George Illawarra Dragons. In 2010, Leilua joined the Sydney Roosters. Leilua played for the Roosters' NYC team in 2010, scoring 3 tries in 4 games. In 2009, he played for the Australian Schoolboys team.

== Playing career ==
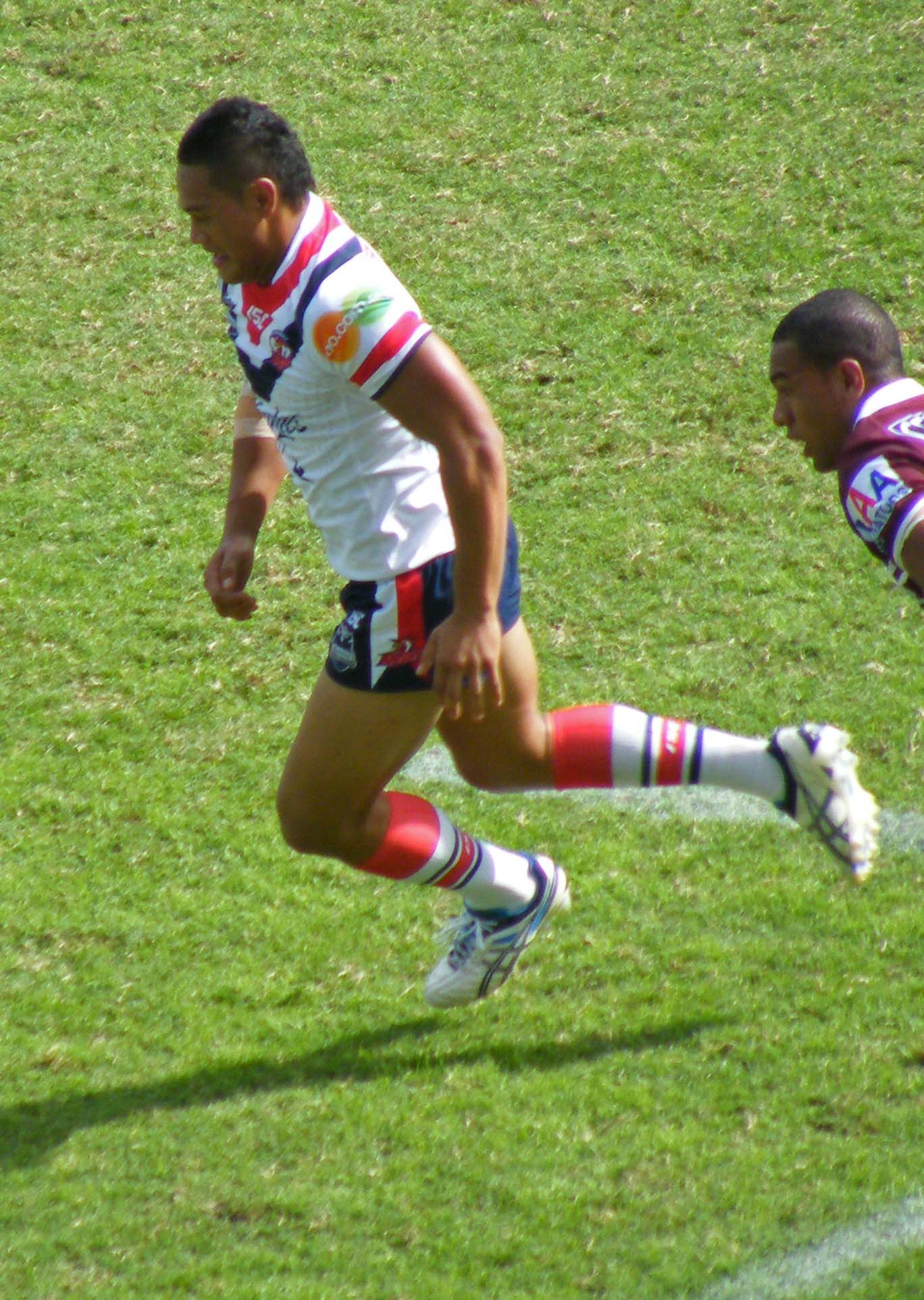
Leilua playing for the Roosters in 2011.

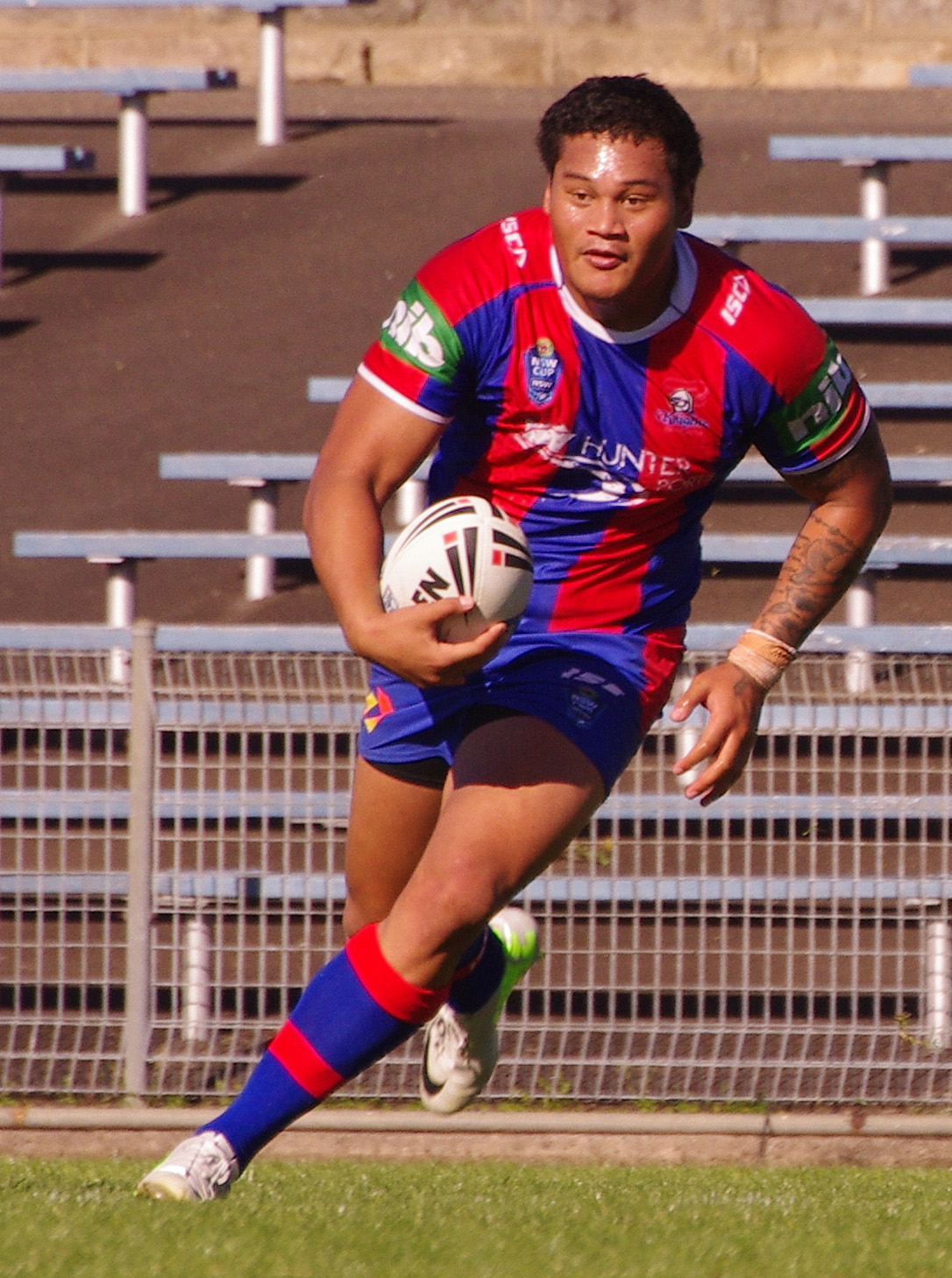
Leilua playing for the Knights in 2013

=== 2010 ===
In round 12 of the 2010 NRL season, Leilua made his NRL debut for the Sydney Roosters against the Gold Coast Titans off the interchange bench in the Roosters 30–16 win at Robina Stadium. In Round 19 against the Canterbury-Bankstown Bulldogs, Leilua scored his first and second NRL career tries in the Roosters 36–32 win at ANZ Stadium. On 3 October 2010, Leilua played in the Roosters 2010 NRL Grand Final against the St George Illawarra Dragons, Leilua played on the wing in the 32–8 loss. Leilua finished his debut year in the NRL with him playing in 17 matches and scoring 3 tries in the 2010 NRL season. Leilua was also selected in the New Zealand training squad for the 2010 Four Nations but did not make the final squad.

=== 2011 ===
Leilua finished the 2011 NRL season with him playing in 23 matches and scoring 11 tries for the Roosters.

=== 2012 ===
In January 2012, Leilua was named in the New South Wales Emerging Blues squad, pledging his allegiance to Australia. On 22 April 2012, Leilua re-signed with the Roosters on a 2-year contract. Leilua was described as "one of the best on field" NSW City in the annual City vs Country Origin match, playing centre in the 24–22 win at Mudgee. In Game 1 of the 2012 State of Origin series, Leilua was named 19th man for the New South Wales team. Leilua finished the 2012 NRL season with him playing in 19 matches and scoring 6 tries. At the end of the year, Leilua was again named in the New South Wales Emerging Blues squad. In October 2012, Leilua was arrested after being accused of breaching an AVO, spitting on his ex-girlfriend, and distributing lewd photos of her. He was released on $6000 bail. He was then placed on a one-year good behaviour bond after being found guilty of sending nude photos of his former girlfriend to her brother and a friend. On 18 December 2012, Leilua was released from his Roosters contract due to disciplinary reasons. On 22 December 2012, Leilua joined the Newcastle Knights.

=== 2013 ===
On 5 March 2013, Leilua officially signed a two-year contract with the Newcastle Knights starting in the same year. In Round 6 of the 2013 NRL season, Leilua made his club debut for the Newcastle Knights against the Penrith Panthers at centre in the Knights 8–6 win at Hunter Stadium.

After playing a few more weeks playing in the Knights New South Wales Cup team, Leilua cemented his centre position after regular centre Timana Tahu was dropped to the New South Wales Cup for the rest of the season. Leilua return to the Knights first grade squad in round 10 against the Canterbury-Bankstown Bulldogs, scoring his first club try for the Knights in the 44–8 win at Hunter Stadium. Leilua finished his first season with the Newcastle Knights with him playing in 19 matches and scoring 13 tries. He was selected to represent Samoa in the 2013 Rugby League World Cup, held in England and Wales. Leilua made his international debut for Samoa against New Zealand at centre, scoring a try in Samoa's 42–24 loss at Halliwell Jones Stadium. Leilua played in all 4 matches and scored a try in the tournament.

=== 2014 ===
In February 2014, Leilua was selected in the Knights inaugural 2014 Auckland Nines squad.

On 22 April 2014, Leilua re-signed with the Knights for a further two years, keeping him at the club until the end of the 2016 season.

In round 26 against the St George Illawarra Dragons, Leilua played his 100th NRL career match, scoring a try in Newcastle's 40–10 win at Hunter Stadium. Leilua finished the season with him playing in 22 matches and scoring 11 tries . On 7 October 2014, Leilua was selected in the Samoa final 24-man squad for the 2014 Four Nations series. Leilua played in all 3 matches and scored a try in the tournament.

=== 2015 ===
In the pre-season, Leilua was reportedly on the outer with new Knights coach Rick Stone, after he returned to training overweight and was rumoured to have had a run-in with the senior Newcastle player Beau Scott about his attitude and fitness. On 2 May, Leilua played for Samoa against Tonga in the 2015 Polynesian Cup, playing at centre in Samoa's 18–16 win at Robina Stadium.

On 14 May 2015, Leilua executed a clause in his contract, releasing him from the final year of his Newcastle contract, making him a free agent for 2016.

On 15 June 2015, Leilua was granted a release from his 2015 contract mid-season, allowing him to join his new team effective immediately. On 17 June 2015, Leilua joined the Canberra Raiders mid-season for the rest of the year. In Round 16, Leilua made his club debut for the Canberra Raiders against the New Zealand Warriors, playing off the interchange bench in the Raiders 30–8 loss at Mount Smart Stadium. Leilua finished off the 2015 NRL season, having played in 19 games, 13 for Newcastle and 6 for Canberra, and scoring 6 tries, all for the Knights. On 13 November 2018, Leilua re-signed with the Raiders on a 3-year contract.

=== 2016 ===
In round 8 against the Wests Tigers, Leilua scored his first two tries for Canberra in their 60–6 win at Canberra Stadium. During the season, Leilua and his wing partner, Jordan Rapana, scored and assisted on multiple tries. Their off-field relationship led to them being nicknamed "Leipana".

In round 26 against the Wests Tigers, Leilua produced the pass of the season by scooping up a loose ball and was able to get an arm free in a tackle with Tigers winger Josh Addo-Carr on him to flick the ball behind his back to Jordan Rapana who finished off to score to the try in the 52–10 win at Leichhardt Oval. On 26 September 2016, Leilua was named the Australia 2016 Four Nations train-on squad but later dropped out due to a hamstring injury. On 28 September 2016, Leilua was named as the Centre of the Year at the 2016 Dally M Awards night, a significant uprise from being in the lows of falling out of favour at the Newcastle Knights at the start of 2015 NRL season. Leilua finished his solid 2016 NRL season with him playing in 25 matches and scoring 11 tries for Canberra.

=== 2017 ===
In round 6 against the Gold Coast Titans, Leilua played his 150th NRL career match and scored a try in the 42–16 win at Robina Stadium. On 6 May 2017, Leilua played for Samoa in the test against England, starting at centre and scoring a try in the 30–10 loss at Campbelltown Stadium. On 7 June 2017, Leilua extended his contract with the Canberra club to the end of the 2020 season. Leilua finished the 2017 NRL season with him playing in 24 matches and scoring 10 tries for the Raiders. On 6 October 2017, Leilua was selected in the 24-man squad for Samoa in the 2017 Rugby League World Cup. Leilua played in all 4 matches, starting at centre in Samoa's disappointing campaign. At the end of the season, there was rumours that Leilua was set to be forced out of Canberra to join the Gold Coast Titans to ease their salary cap after a hot-and-cold mixed form year.

=== 2018 ===
After playing in the World Cup, Leilua along with Samoan representative team-mates Josh Papalii and Junior Paulo were confronted by coach Ricky Stuart after they arrived at pre-season training overweight, the trio were forced to join the dreaded "Fat Club", doing extra cardio training sessions to get back into a respectable weight. On 23 June 2018, Leilua played for Samoa in the Polynesian Cup against Tonga, playing at centre in the 38–22 win at Campbelltown Stadium.

In round 17 against the Canterbury-Bankstown Bulldogs, Leilua scored the winning try with a minute to go after the Raiders scored 3 tries in 6 minutes to fulltime from a 28–14 deficit at Canterbury's spiritual home ground of Belmore Oval. After scoring the try, Leilua taunted Bulldogs defenders, brothers Josh and Brett Morris in which Leilua was criticised by coach Ricky Stuart and Parramatta Eels legend Peter Sterling, Sterling commenting, but it was the post-try spray he gave the Morris brothers that raised Sterling's hackles the most. "This is Josh and Brett Morris, who have done everything in the game and achieved a whole lot more than BJ looks like he will," "You don't disrespect those kinds of players in those situations where you've been poor yourself up until that moment." On 26 September 2018, Leilua was a shock winner of the Centre of the Year award after beaten clear favourite, the Sydney Roosters boom youngster Latrell Mitchell. Leilua finished his rocks and diamonds 2018 NRL season with him playing in all of Canberra's 24 matches and being their highest try-scorer with 14 tries.

=== 2019 ===
Leilua began the 2019 NRL season in good form scoring 4 tries in 7 games as the club sat in the top 4 of the competition in the opening rounds. In round 7 against Manly, Leilua was taken from the field during the club's 24–20 loss. Scans later revealed that Leilua had suffered a neck injury and was ruled out for the season. In round 22, Leilua would make a shock early return to play his 200th game in Canberra's 18–22 win over the Melbourne Storm at AAMI Park.

Leilua played a total of 12 games for Canberra as the club reached their first grand final in 25 years. Leilua played at centre in the 2019 NRL Grand Final as Canberra were defeated 14–8 by the Sydney Roosters at ANZ Stadium.

=== 2020 ===
After five seasons playing in the nation's capital, Leilua signed a three-year deal with Wests Tigers where his brother Luciano is currently playing, beginning in the 2020 NRL season. At that time, he was asked by the media "Who is the best centre in the NRL?" Leilua responded by saying "You’re looking at him. If you're talking about who's the best... you're looking at him. I won’t sugar coat that, it’s not funny, I always said if I really want it I can do it. The only thing that stopped me last year was my injury. I was going towards that, being the best, then unfortunately got a serious injury."

Leilua made his debut for Wests against St. George Illawarra in round 1 of the 2020 NRL season at WIN Stadium. Wests went on to win the match 24–14.

In round 8 against Penrith, Leilua was sin binned after hitting Penrith player Dylan Edwards around the head in an off the ball incident. Fox Sports commentators Braith Anasta and Andrew Voss both shared their views on the incident with Anasta saying “Jeez he comes up with some dumb plays BJ, That is just so unnecessary". Voss then said “That’s just crap, He needs to settle down, he has to go for that,” Anasta added. “He does some stupid things and he doesn’t need to. It’s been his achilles heel his whole career Joey, he just can’t control his temperament".

Leilua played a total of 14 games for Wests in the 2020 NRL season scoring four tries as the club finished 11th and missed out on the finals.

=== 2021 ===
After two heavy defeats to start the 2021 NRL season, Leilua was demoted to reserve grade by coach Michael Maguire.

On 6 September, Leilua was one of five players who were released by the Wests Tigers club. On 20 October, Leilua took to Instagram and denied media reports that he had signed a train and trial contract with the Wests Tigers worth $1000 a week. Leilua also attacked Wests head coach Michael Maguire writing “Btw I wouldn’t play for someone that blames the team all the time! And not once himself! #Madge".

On 24 November, Leilua signed a contract to join RFL Championship side Featherstone. On 22 December, Leilua made his boxing debut against former NRL player Chris Heighington in the Footy Fight Night Christmas Bash. After being declared the winner, Leilua went on a foul mouthed tirade in the post-match interview saying “For all those haters that f***ing said I can’t last four rounds, thanks mate, “You gave me the inspiration tonight. I knew I could fight, I just wanted to f***ing show the whole world that I could f***ing last four rounds, “You stare on top of me being fat and can’t last four rounds, you know what? F*** yourselves, there you go".

=== 2022 ===
On 7 February, Leilua made his club debut for Featherstone in their 28–6 victory over Leigh. On 28 May, Leilua played for Featherstone in their 2022 RFL 1895 Cup final loss against Leigh.

=== 2023 ===
Following his exit from Featherstone Rovers at the end of the 2023 season, on 8 November it was reported that he was heading back to Australia to resume his boxing career. It was then reported that he had joined the Dapto Canaries upon his return to Australia.

=== 2025 ===
After two seasons in Dapto, Leilua was reported as signing with the Wyong Roos for the 2025 season.
