= Mitchell Pearce =

Australian rugby league footballer

Mitch Pearce
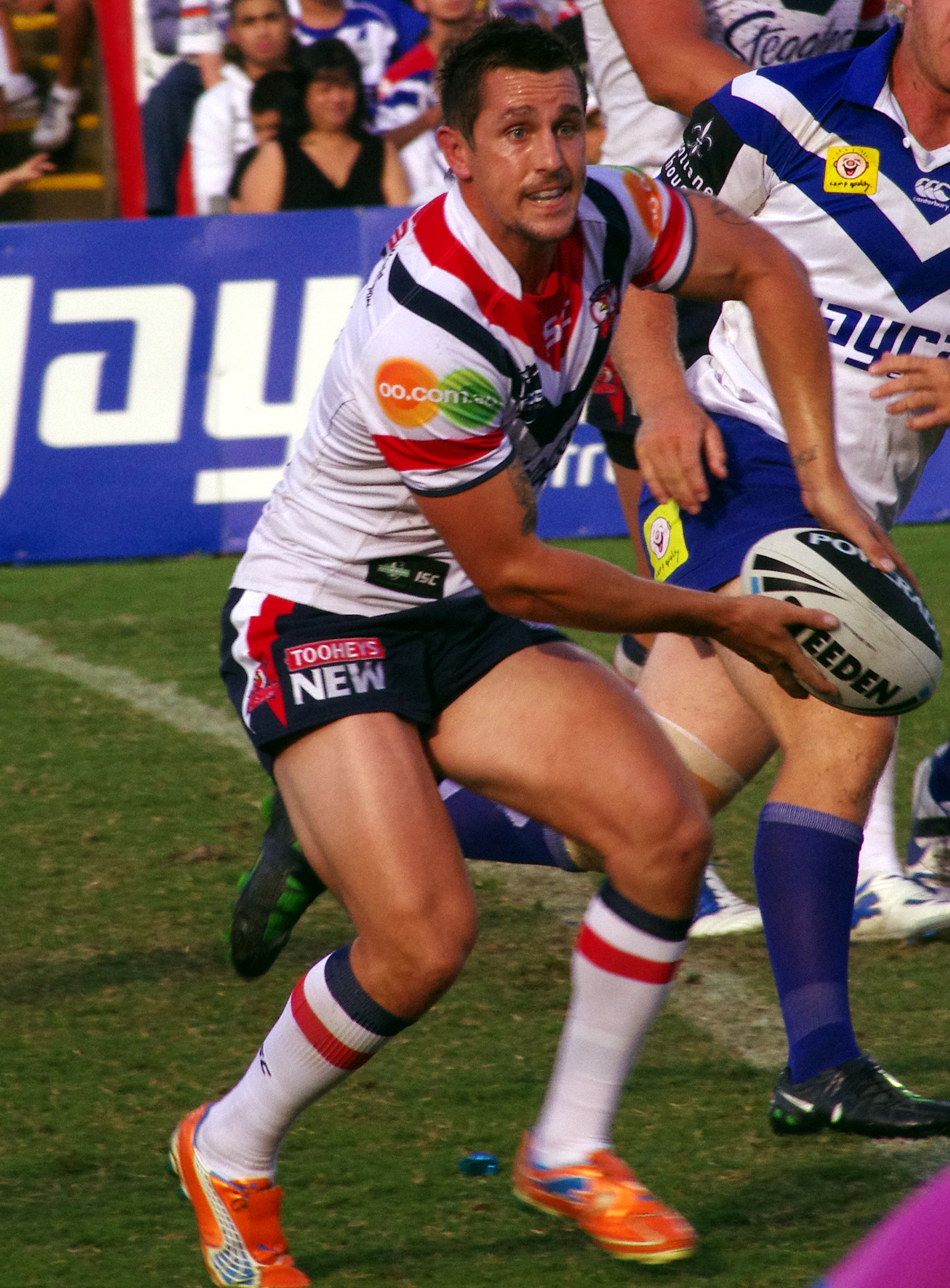

Personal information
- Full name: Mitchell Pearce
- Born: 7 April 1989 (age 37) Sydney, New South Wales, Australia

Playing information
- Height: 6 ft 0 in (1.82 m)
- Weight: 14 st 5 lb (91 kg)
- Position: Scrum-half, Stand-off
Club
Years	Team	Pld	T	G	FG	P
2007–17	Sydney Roosters	238	62	0	6	254
2018–21	Newcastle Knights	71	15	0	5	65
2022–23	Catalans Dragons	41	14	0	0	56
	Total	350	91	0	11	375
Representative
Years	Team	Pld	T	G	FG	P
2008–12	NSW City	3	0	0	0	0
2008–19	New South Wales	19	3	0	0	12
2011–16	Prime Minister's XIII	2	0	0	0	0
2015	NRL All Stars	1	0	0	0	0
- Father: Wayne Pearce

Mitchell Pearce (born 7 April 1989) is an Australian former professional rugby league footballer who last played as a scrum-half for the Catalans Dragons in the Super League.

He previously played for Sydney Roosters, with whom he won the 2013 NRL Grand Final, and Newcastle Knights in the NRL. Pearce has played for City Origin, New South Wales in the State of Origin series, the Prime Minister's XIII and the NRL All Stars side.

== Early life ==
Pearce was born in Sydney, New South Wales, Australia. He is the son of the ARL commissioner, former Balmain Tigers legend, New South Wales and Australian international Wayne Pearce.

He played his junior football for the Asquith Magpies and North Ryde Hawks. Pearce attended and played rugby union for Barker College, before transferring to Marist Catholic College North Shore for his senior years, where he played league alongside his friend Kieran Foran. Pearce would later be signed by the Sydney Roosters.

== Playing career ==
=== Sydney Roosters (2007-2017) ===
In Round 2 of the 2007 NRL season, Pearce made his NRL debut for the Sydney Roosters against the North Queensland Cowboys, starting at halfback in the 43–6 loss at 1300SMILES Stadium. After three First Grade appearances for the Roosters, Pearce's contract was extended by the club to the end of the 2010 season. In Round 12 against the Newcastle Knights, Pearce scored his first NRL career try in the Roosters 22–18 loss at Central Coast Stadium. In Round 14 against the Penrith Panthers, Pearce scored an 80-metre try in the final minute from a loose carry from Panthers halfback Craig Gower, the man who previously drunkenly attacked Pearce 2 years prior, and got the last laugh by scoring the try off Gower's mistake to win the match for the Roosters 24–20 at Penrith Stadium. Later into the season, Pearce was ruled out for 6 weeks to due a back injury and later in Round 23 onwards where he played off the interchange bench in last 3 matches. Pearce finished his debut year in the NRL with him playing in 16 matches and scoring 2 tries in the 2007 NRL season.

In Round 21 of the 2008 NRL season against the North Queensland Cowboys, Pearce scored his hat trick of tries in the Roosters 32–20 win at 1300SMILES Stadium.

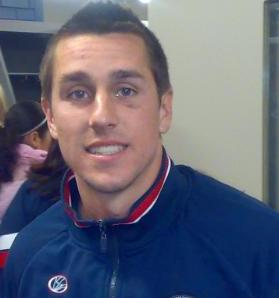
Pearce in 2008

Pearce finished the 2008 season with him playing in 25 matches, scoring 7 tries and kicking 1 field goal for the Roosters.

Pearce finished Roosters' wooden spoon dreaded 2009 NRL season with him playing in all the Roosters 24 matches, scoring 8 tries and kicking 1 field goal.

Pearce would later be one of the main players to lead the Roosters who were last place wooden spooner's in the previous season to the 2010 NRL Grand Final against the St George Illawarra Dragons, as the Roosters made the finals in 6th place. On 3 October 2010, Pearce started at halfback in the Roosters 32–8 defeat on the big day. Pearce finished the 2010 NRL season with him playing in 22 matches and scored 9 tries for the Roosters.

In Round 18 of the 2011 NRL season against the Penrith Panthers, Pearce played his 100th NRL career match in the Roosters 34–26 win at Sydney Football Stadium. Pearce finished the season with him playing in 21 matches, scoring 3 tries and kicking 1 field goal.

In June 2012, Pearce was rumoured to be leaving the Roosters to join the Wests Tigers because a tough relationship with Brian Smith over Pierce's party boy antics as covered by the media. Pearce finished the 2012 NRL season with him playing in 22 matches and scoring 10 tries.

On 13 February 2013, Pearce extended his contract with the Roosters to the end of the 2017 season. With a new coach of Trent Robinson and new halves partner of James Maloney, Pearce's form was improving from previous seasons and later played in the 2013 State of Origin series, playing in all 3 matches at halfback alongside Maloney in the 2–1 series loss. In Round 23 against the Wests Tigers, Pearce played his 150th NRL career match and scored 2 tries in the 56–14 win at Sydney Football Stadium. Pearce would help the Roosters to win the Minor Premiership and later made it into the 2013 NRL Grand Final where they played against the Manly-Warringah Sea Eagles. On 6 October 2013, Pearce played at halfback in the 26–18 win at ANZ Stadium. Pearce finished the Roosters successful 2013 NRL season with him playing in 26 matches and scoring 5 tries.

In May 2014, Pearce was given an infringement notice by police after he refused to leave a nightclub in Kings Cross after a female clubber complained about his actions. He was later fined $20,000 and given a one match suspension. Pearce was later dropped from the New South Wales squad, where Canterbury-Bankstown Bulldogs halfback Trent Hodkinson took over his incumbent spot and by coincidence he scored the winning try in Game 2 to win the series for the Blues for the first time since 2005 as Pearce has never had an Origin series win. Pearce finished the 2014 NRL season with him playing in 26 matches and scoring 9 tries for the Roosters.

In Round 21 of the 2015 NRL season against the Canterbury-Bankstown Bulldogs, Pearce became the youngest player in NRL history to play 200 career matches (at 26 years 115 days) as the Roosters won 38–28 at Sydney Football Stadium. Pearce was appointed co-captain of the Roosters and his side went on to win the Minor Premiership but bowed out in the Preliminary Final against the Brisbane Broncos when they were defeated 31–12 at Suncorp Stadium. Pearce finished the 2015 NRL season with him playing in 21 matches and scoring one try for the Roosters.

After Pearce's controversial drunken Australia Day antics in January 2016 that were caught on video, Pearce was fined $125,000 by the NRL, suspended for 8 matches and lost his co-captaincy for the Roosters. Pearce later made his return for the Roosters in Round 8 against the Newcastle Knights, scoring a try in the 38–0 win at Sydney Football Stadium. Pearce was not selected for New South Wales for the 2016 State of Origin series, with selectors opting to put South Sydney Rabbitohs half Adam Reynolds at halfback. Pearce finished his rough 2016 NRL season with him playing in a career low 12 matches and scoring one try for the Roosters.

In the Round 8 of the 2017 NRL season during the Anzac Day match against the St George Illawarra Dragons, Pearce kicked a game winning field goal in the 83rd minute during Golden Point to give the Roosters a 13–12 victory and won the ANZAC Man of the Match Medal at Sydney Football Stadium. In Round 16 against the Melbourne Storm, Pearce would again kick a match winning field goal in Golden Point to give the Roosters a 25–24 victory at Adelaide Oval. Pearce who started the season in good form would again get selected to play at halfback for New South Wales for the 2017 State of Origin series in all 3 matches and scored 2 tries in another unsuccessful attempt to be part of winning Origin team. On 27 September 2017, Pearce was the winner of the Peter Frilingos Headline Moment of the Year of his match winning performance in the Roosters ANZAC Day clash against the St George Illawarra Dragons. Following the 2017 season in which Pearce helped the Roosters take second place on the ladder and make it to the preliminary final, it was announced that the Roosters had signed Melbourne Storm superstar halfback Cooper Cronk on a two-year deal. Pearce, feeling betrayed, started weighing his future in what would be the biggest decision in his career. In the end, Pearce decided to leave the club and on 20 November 2017, the Sydney Roosters granted Pearce an immediate release from his remaining contract. Pearce was negotiating with the Newcastle Knights, Manly-Warringah Sea Eagles and the Cronulla-Sutherland Sharks. On 30 November 2017, it was announced that Pearce signed a 4-year deal with the Newcastle Knights starting from 2018, worth about $4 Million over the time. Pearce finished his 10-year stint with the Sydney Roosters with him playing in 23 matches, scoring 7 tries and kicking 3 field goals in the 2017 NRL season.

=== Newcastle Knights (2018-2021) ===
In Round 1 of the 2018 season, Pearce made his debut for the Knights in their 19–18 golden point extra-time win over the Manly Warringah Sea Eagles, kicking the winning field goal. In Round 3, Pearce played against his former club Sydney Roosters going down 8–38. Four weeks later in the Round 7 clash, he tore his pectoral muscle in the Knights' 22–20 win against the Wests Tigers at Scully Park. This injury caused him to miss 10 weeks during which the Knights only won two games. Once returning from injury, Pearce played in the remaining 8 games of the season. He ended the year with 22 votes in the Dally M Awards, finishing in 5th overall and 2nd for the Knights.

Pearce played 21 games for Newcastle in the 2020 NRL season as the club reached the finals for the first time since 2013. Pearce played in the club's elimination final loss against South Sydney.

In January 2021, Pearce stepped down as Newcastle captain after he allegedly sent text messages of a sexual nature to a female Newcastle staff member.

In Round 3 of the 2021 NRL season, he played his 300th first grade game in Newcastle's loss against the Wests Tigers. The following week, Pearce was taken from the field with a pectoral injury in Newcastle's defeat to St. George Illawarra.

In Round 24, Pearce kicked a field goal for Newcastle in the final minute of play which won the game for the Knights 15–14 over the Gold Coast Titans. The victory meant Newcastle would qualify for the finals.

On 27 October, Pearce requested a release from the final year of his Newcastle contract to join Super League side Catalans Dragons in 2022. The request release was granted on 15 November.

=== Catalan Dragons (2022-2023) ===
In Round 1 of the 2022 Super League season, Pearce made his club debut for Catalans Dragons where they lost 28–8 against St Helens R.F.C.

Pearce finished the 2022 season scoring ten tries in 23 games. Pearce played in Catalans elimination final loss to Leeds.

On 12 September 2023, Pearce announced that he would retire from rugby league following the conclusion of the 2023 Super League season. On 14 October, Pearce played in Catalans 2023 Super League Grand Final loss against Wigan which would also be his final match as a player.

=== Representative career ===
On 2 May 2008, Pearce made his representative debut, playing for City Origin against Country Origin and starting at halfback in the 22–22 all draw at WIN Stadium. On 2 July 2008, Pearce was selected to make his State of Origin debut for New South Wales, replacing the injured Peter Wallace in the Game 3 series decider match at ANZ Stadium. The Blues were defeated 16–10 and lost the series. Pearce later said, "In hindsight I wish I never played that early when I was 19 to 22. I definitely wasn't ready. As a halfback in Origin at 19, it was way too early. I probably developed some bad doubts from that period in those first few games. It's a daunting thing."

Pearce regained the halfback spot for New South Wales in Game 2 of the 2010 State of Origin series, where they were beaten by Queensland 34–6 at Suncorp Stadium and lost the series for a fifth consecutive year. Pearce also played in Game 3, where the Blues were beaten 23–18 at ANZ Stadium and a whitewash 3–0 series loss.

On 6 May 2011, Pearce played for City Origin against Country Origin, playing at halfback in the 18–12 loss in Albury. Pearce was selected to play at halfback in all three matches for New South Wales in their 2–1 series defeat in the 2011 State of Origin series. Pearce scored his first Origin try in Game 1, where the Blues lost 16–12 at Suncorp Stadium. On 25 September 2011, Pearce played for Prime Minister's XIII against Papua New Guinea, playing at halfback in the 36–22 win in Lae.

On 22 April 2012, Pearce played for City Origin against Country Origin, playing at halfback in the 24–22 loss in Mudgee. Pearce was selected to play at halfback in all 3 matches for New South Wales in their 2–1 series defeat in the 2012 State of Origin series.

In 2013, Pearce's form was improving from previous seasons and later played in the 2013 State of Origin series, playing in all three matches at halfback alongside James Maloney, in the 2–1 series loss.

Pearce made his return to the Origin arena for the 2015 State of Origin series playing at five-eighth, a position he usually does not play at, in all three matches as NSW went down to lose the series 2–1. In Game 3 as the Blues copped an embarrassing 52–6 series decider defeat, Pearce was on the receiving off a brutal sledge from Queensland five-eighth Johnathan Thurston, saying to Pearce, "If you want to touch the shield, your best chance is to go up and touch the Wally Lewis statue out the front of the stadium, I'll take the picture, that will be the closest you get to the shield in your lifetime", after Pearce allegedly sledged him before the match saying that he was "too old for Origin".

On 24 September 2016, Pearce played for Prime Minister's XIII against Papua New Guinea, playing at halfback in the 58–0 win in Port Moresby.

Pearce played at halfback for New South Wales for the 2017 State of Origin series in all three matches and scored two tries in another unsuccessful attempt for Pearce to be part of winning Origin team.

Recalled for the final game of the 2019 State of Origin series, Pearce was a part of New South Wales' 26–20 win and the series victory. On the 8th attempt, it was the first time Pearce had been part of a winning series.

== Statistics ==
Year	Team	Appearance	Tries	Goals	F/G	Points
2007	Sydney Roosters	16	2	–	–	8
2008	Sydney Roosters	25	7	–	1	29
2009	Sydney Roosters	24	8	–	1	33
2010	Sydney Roosters	22	9	–	–	36
2011	Sydney Roosters	21	3	–	1	13
2012	Sydney Roosters	22	10	–	–	40
2013	Sydney Roosters	26	5	–	–	20
2014	Sydney Roosters	26	9	–	1	36
2015	Sydney Roosters	21	1	–	–	4
2016	Sydney Roosters	12	1	-	-	4
2017	Sydney Roosters	21	7		3	31
2018	Newcastle Knights	15	2	-	1	9
2019	Newcastle Knights	23	8		1	33
2020	Newcastle Knights	21	2		1	9
2021	Newcastle Knights	12	3		1	13
2022	Catalans Dragons	23	10			40
2023	Catalans Dragons	18	4			16
Overall		350	91	0	11	375

== Controversies ==
=== 2005 golf function incident ===
In December 2005, Pearce, then 16 years old, was at a charity golf function in the Sunshine Coast when he was attacked by a drunken Craig Gower, the Penrith Panthers captain. Gower allegedly chased Pearce around the resort with a glass bottle before vomiting on him; Gower was also accused of manhandling and groping Pearce's older sister Tatum Pearce.

=== 2014 King Cross nightclub ===
In May 2014, Pearce was fined $20,000 and suspended for one game by the Roosters following an incident in a Kings Cross nightclub. A video broadcast on the Nine Network appeared to show a woman in a yellow dress becoming agitated by Pearce's actions. She had made a complaint to the police, but did not proceed with further action. The police issued an infringement notice to Pearce for failing to leave the club when asked and banned him from the Kings Cross area for 48 hours.

=== 2016 Australia Day party ===
On 27 January 2016, a video was aired showing an intoxicated Pearce forcing an unwanted kiss on a woman and, when rejected, simulating sex with her dog, after having urinated on himself and her couch. Within hours the Sydney Roosters released a short statement stating that they had advised the NRL's Integrity Unit of the incident and would conduct an internal investigation. The NRL, in turn, asked the Roosters for a report into the incident. Two days after the video was first aired, an emotional Pearce read a statement to the media apologising for his actions and acknowledging that he has a problem with alcohol. He left Australia shortly thereafter, for treatment in an "intensive rehabilitation facility for an extended period".

Following his return to Australia at the end of February, Pearce said that he had given up alcohol. Shortly afterwards, Pearce overcame the impasse in negotiations between the Roosters and the NRL over the severity of his punishment by phoning his club and saying that he "deserved to be side-lined for a lengthy period". He was given a fine of $125,000, with $50,000 being suspended for two years, and an eight match ban.

=== Wedding postponement ===
In December 2020, Pearce's wedding was reportedly called off due to him sending text messages of a sexual nature to a female Newcastle staff member. Pearce's partner had reportedly also seen the text messages. Pearce spoke to the media about the wedding being postponed saying "It’s COVID mate … and it’s private", Pearce said.

"We’re sorting things out. It’s a really stressful time for us. It’s our business, no-one else’s". Newcastle media manager Frank Barrett told The Daily Telegraph: "The Newcastle Knights are aware of the issue but it’s a private matter that stays between the two individuals".
