= Sonny Tuigamala =

Australian rugby league footballer

Personal information
- Born: 17 June 1988 (age 37); Sydney, Australia
- Height: 183 cm (6 ft 0 in)
- Weight: 87 kg (13 st 10 lb)

Playing information
- Position: Wing
Club
Years	Team	Pld	T	G	FG	P
2009	Sydney Roosters	4	0	0	0	0
- Source: NRL Stats

Sonny Tuigamala (born 17 June 1988) is an Australian former professional rugby league footballer who played for the Sydney Roosters in the NRL.

== Early life ==
Tuigamala was educated at Chifley College Bidwill Campus and played his junior footy for St Mary's Saints in Western Sydney. He previously played for the Penrith Toyota Cup Team.

== Playing career ==
Tuigamala made his first grade debut for the Sydney Roosters in round 3 of the 2009 NRL season against the Wests Tigers. Tuigamala played four matches with the club which were all losses. Tuigamala spent most of the season playing for the clubs feeder side Newtown in the NSW Cup where he was their top try scorer. The Sydney Roosters would finish the 2009 season with the Wooden Spoon. Tuigamala signed back with junior club, Penrith, for the 2011 NRL season, but did not play any first grade matches for the Western Sydney club.
