= Mitchell Aubusson =

Australian rugby league footballer

Mitch Aubusson
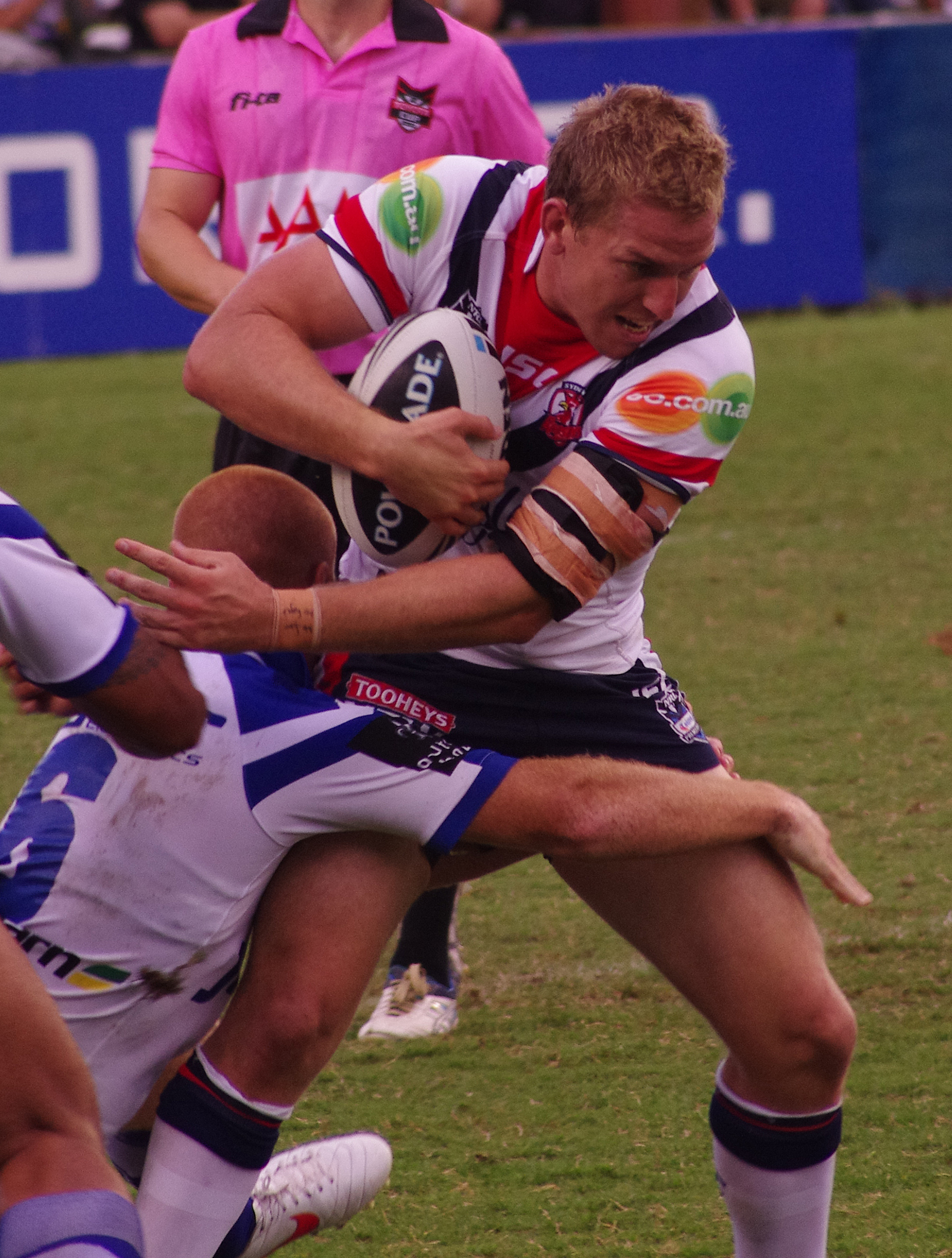

Personal information
- Full name: Mitchell Aubusson
- Born: 1 October 1987 (age 39) Sydney, New South Wales, Australia

Playing information
- Height: 183 cm (6 ft 0 in)
- Weight: 96 kg (15 st 2 lb)
- Position: Second-row, Centre
Club
| Years | Team | Pld | T | G | FG | P |
|---|---|---|---|---|---|---|
| 2007–20 | Sydney Roosters | 310 | 68 | 0 | 0 | 272 |
Representative
| Years | Team | Pld | T | G | FG | P |
| 2016–17 | NSW Country | 2 | 0 | 0 | 0 | 0 |
- Relatives: James Aubusson (brother)

Mitchell Aubusson (born 1 October 1987) is an Australian former professional rugby league footballer who played as a second-row and centre, spending his entire career with the Sydney Roosters in the National Rugby League (NRL). He won three NRL premierships with the Sydney Roosters in 2013, 2018 and 2019. He has also played for NSW Country at representative level. Aubusson is the Sydney Roosters 2nd highest capped player with 306 matches played.

== Background ==
While attending Xavier Catholic College Ballina in 2005, Aubusson played for the Australian Schoolboys team.

== Career ==
Aubusson played in the 2006 NSW Cup grand final for Newtown, who were the feeder club for the Sydney Roosters at the time. Newtown would lose the final 20-19 against Parramatta at Stadium Australia.

In the 2009 NRL season, Aubusson played 17 games as the club finished last on the table for the first time since 1966.

Aubusson was part of the Roosters' sides who won 3 consecutive minor premierships in 2013, 2014 and 2015 but failed to reach the grand final in the latter two seasons. In 2017, Aubusson made 25 appearances for the club as the Roosters made the preliminary final but fell short of a grand final appearance losing to North Queensland 29–16. In 2018, Aubusson was part of the side that won its fourth Minor Premiership in six years. Aubusson then played in the 2018 NRL Grand Final in which the Sydney Roosters defeated Melbourne 21-6 winning their 14th premiership and Aubusson's second.

In round 4 of the 2019 NRL season, Aubusson scored 2 tries as the Roosters defeated Brisbane 36–4 at the Sydney Cricket Ground. On 19 August 2019, Aubusson signed a one-year contract extension with the Roosters, through to the end of 2020. Aubusson played in the club's 2019 NRL Grand Final victory over Canberra at ANZ Stadium. Aubusson only played 12 minutes of the game before he was taken from the field with a knee injury. It was Aubusson's third premiership victory as a player. In round 13 of the 2020 NRL season, Aubusson became the third Sydney Roosters player to play 300 games. Aubusson celebrated by scoring a try in his team's 24–16 victory over St. George at WIN Stadium.

== Post playing ==
After retiring from the NRL in 2020 Aubusson would return to the Sydney in 2021. Aubusson works in a behind the scenes role as a player recruiter for the junior pathways squad, football operations manager and club ambassador. On 24 February 2022, Aubusson was inducted as a life member of the Sydney Roosters. In 2024 Aubusson was placed on the clubs Heritage Committee.

== Statistics ==
| Year | Team | Games | Tries | Pts |
|---|---|---|---|---|
| 2007 | Sydney Roosters | 17 | 3 | 12 |
| 2008 | Sydney Roosters | 22 | 9 | 36 |
| 2009 | Sydney Roosters | 17 | 4 | 16 |
| 2010 | Sydney Roosters | 26 | 8 | 32 |
| 2011 | Sydney Roosters | 8 | 1 | 4 |
| 2012 | Sydney Roosters | 24 | 3 | 12 |
| 2013 | Sydney Roosters | 26 | 7 | 28 |
| 2014 | Sydney Roosters | 26 | 5 | 20 |
| 2015 | Sydney Roosters | 26 | 5 | 20 |
| 2016 | Sydney Roosters | 22 | 5 | 20 |
| 2017 | Sydney Roosters | 25 | 5 | 20 |
| 2018 | Sydney Roosters | 24 | 1 | 4 |
| 2019 | Sydney Roosters | 26 | 7 | 28 |
| 2020 | Sydney Roosters | 17 | 5 | 20 |
| | Totals | 310 | 68 | 272 |
