= List of Queensland Cup records =

Queensland Cup records have been maintained continuously since the first Queensland Cup premiership season of 1996. Reserve-grade games played between premiership teams are included, but not pre-season warm-up games or NRL State Championship games. The following records are taken from Queensland Rugby League's official website and are correct as of the end of the 2016 season. All records are correct as of the start of the 2020 season.

== Team records ==
=== Premierships ===
Titles	Club	Seasons
6	Redcliffe Dolphins	1997, 2000, 2002, 2003, 2006, 2018
4	Burleigh Bears	1999, 2004, 2016, 2019
4	Norths Devils	1998, 2021, 2022, 2024
2	Northern Pride	2010, 2014
2	Wynnum Manly Seagulls	2011, 2012
2	Toowoomba Clydesdales	1996, 2001
1	Brisbane Tigers	2023
1	PNG Hunters	2017
1	Ipswich Jets	2015
1	Mackay Cutters	2013
1	Sunshine Coast Falcons	2009
1	Souths Logan Magpies	2008
1	Tweed Heads Seagulls	2007
1	North Queensland Young Guns	2005

==== Most consecutive ====
- 2 – Redcliffe (2002 to 2003)
- 2 – Wynnum Manly (2011 to 2012)
- 2 - Norths Devils (2021 to 2022)

=== Runners-up ===
Titles	Club	Seasons
7	Redcliffe Dolphins	1996, 1999, 2001, 2007, 2012, 2016, 2022
5	Easts Tigers	1997, 2004, 2013, 2014, 2018
3	Burleigh Bears	2003, 2005, 2023
2	Wynnum Manly Seagulls	2019, 2021
2	Ipswich Jets	2002, 2008
2	Toowoomba Clydesdales	2000, 2006
2	Norths Devils	2010, 2024
1	Sunshine Coast Falcons	2017
1	Townsville Blackhawks	2015
1	Tweed Heads Seagulls	2011
1	Northern Pride	2009
1	Wests Panthers	1998

==== Most consecutive ====
- 2 – Easts Tigers (2013 to 2014)
- 2 – Wynnum Manly Seagulls (2019 to 2021*)

*The 2020 season was cancelled.

=== Minor premierships ===
Tally	Club	Seasons
6	Redcliffe Dolphins	1999, 2000, 2002, 2012, 2016, 2018
5	Burleigh Bears	2003, 2004, 2022, 2023, 2025
3	Toowoomba Clydesdales	1996, 2001, 2006
3	Northern Pride	2013, 2014, 2024
2	Norths Devils	1998, 2021
2	Souths Logan Magpies	2009, 2010
2	North Queensland Young Guns	2005, 2007
1	Sunshine Coast Falcons	2019
1	PNG Hunters	2017
1	Townsville Blackhawks	2015
1	Tweed Heads Seagulls	2011
1	Ipswich Jets	2008
1	Wynnum Manly Seagulls	1997

==== Most consecutive ====
- 2 – Redcliffe Dolphins (1999 to 2000)
- 2 – Burleigh Bears (2003 to 2004)
- 2 – Souths Logan Magpies (2009 to 2010)
- 2 – Northern Pride (2013 to 2014)

=== Wooden spoons ===
Tally	Club	Seasons
6	Central Queensland Capras	2005, 2007, 2015, 2017, 2019, 2021
4	Ipswich Jets	1996, 2006, 2010, 2023
4	Souths Logan Magpies	1999, 2001, 2012, 2022
3	Mackay Cutters	2009, 2016, 2018
3	Sunshine Coast Falcons	2011, 2013, 2014
2	Logan Scorpions	1997, 2002
2	Western Clydesdales	2024, 2025
1	Norths Devils	2008
1	Brothers-Valleys	2004
1	Wests Panthers	2003
1	Cairns Cyclones	2000
1	Bundaberg Grizzlies	1998

==== Most consecutive ====
- 2 – Central Queensland Capras (2019 to 2021*)
- 2 – Sunshine Coast Falcons (2013 to 2014)
- 2 – Western Clydesdales (2024 to 2025)

*The 2020 season was cancelled.

=== Team wins, losses, win percentage and draws ===
All-time ladder
Pos	Team	1st season	Last season	Pld	W	L	D	W%
1	Gold Coast Vikings	1998	1998	24	16	8	0	66.67%
2	Redcliffe Dolphins	1996	2023	627	396	211	20	63.16%
3	North Queensland Young Guns	2002	2007	132	83	45	4	62.88%
4	Townsville Blackhawks	2015	2023	181	107	66	8	59.12%
5	Townsville Stingers	1998	1998	22	13	6	3	59.09%
6	Burleigh Bears	1997	2023	591	346	225	20	58.54%
7	Wynnum Manly Seagulls	1996	2023	634	353	263	18	55.68%
8	Northern Pride	2008	2023	345	191	145	9	55.36%
9	Western Clydesdales	1996	2023	271	147	118	6	54.24%
10	Brisbane Brothers	1996	1998	58	31	27	0	53.45%
11	PNG Hunters	2014	2023	201	106	88	7	52.74%
12	Norths Devils	1996	2023	600	312	267	21	52.00%
13	Port Moresby Vipers	1996	1998	33	17	16	0	51.52%
14	Brisbane Tigers	1996	2023	595	304	271	20	51.09%
15	Tweed Heads Seagulls	2003	2023	463	234	213	16	50.54%
16	Aspley Broncos	2007	2007	20	10	9	1	50.00%
17	Sunshine Coast Falcons	1996	2023	341	143	190	8	41.94%
18	Wests Panthers	1996	2003	176	71	99	6	40.34%
19	Mackay Sea Eagles	1996	1996	15	6	8	1	40.00%
20	Ipswich Jets	1996	2023	593	251	324	18	42.33%
21	Souths Logan Magpies	1996	2023	588	227	342	19	38.61%
22	Mackay Cutters	2008	2023	332	122	199	11	36.75%
23	Cairns Cyclones	1996	2000	100	36	60	4	36.00%
24	Central Queensland Capras	1996	2023	569	170	378	21	29.88%
25	Logan Scorpions	1996	2002	141	33	102	6	23.40%
26	Bundaberg Grizzlies	1996	1998	36	4	32	0	11.11%
27	Brothers-Valleys Diehards	2004	2004	22	0	21	1	00.00%

==== Most consecutive wins ====
Rank	Wins	Team	Period
1	17 matches	Northern Pride	from Round 14, 2010 to Round 5, 2011
2	16 matches	North Queensland Young Guns	from Round 10, 2005 to Round 3, 2006

==== Most games without defeat ====
Rank	Wins	Team	Period
1	22 matches	Tweed Heads Seagulls	from Round 22, 2010 to Round 21, 2011
2	19 matches	Northern Pride	from Round 14, 2010 to Round 7, 2011

==== Most consecutive losses ====
Rank	Wins	Team	Period
1	36 matches	Sunshine Coast Falcons	from Round 4, 2003 to Round 18, 2014
2	28 matches	Logan Scorpions	from Round 17, 2001 to Round 22, 2002

=== Result records ===
==== Most points in a game ====
Rank	Points	Winning team	Defeated team	Score	Venue	Round
1	98	Toowoomba Clydesdales	Wests Panthers	78-20	Clive Berghofer Stadium	Round 3 2003

==== Fewest points in a game ====
Rank	Points	Winning team	Defeated team	Score	Venue	Round
1	0	Wynnum Manly Seagulls drew with Burleigh Bears	–	0–0	BMD Kougari Oval	Round 1 2010

==== Highest scores by a losing side ====
Points	Defeated team	Winning team	Score	Venue	Round
42	Tweed Heads Seagulls	Toowoomba Clydesdales	42-44	Clive Berghofer Stadium	Round 2 2006

=== Most points scored by a team in a season ===
- 872 points by the Norths Devils in 1998

=== Fewest points scored by a team in a season ===
- 138 points by Ipswich Jets in 1996

=== Most points conceded by a team in a season ===
- 1192 points by the Logan Scorpions in 2002

=== Least points conceded by a team in a season ===
- 193 points by Redcliffe Dolphins in 1996

== Individual records ==
Note: Figures in boldface are currently playing in the Queensland Cup.

=== Most games ===
Games	Player	Clubs
282	Phil Dennis	Wests Panthers, Easts Tigers, Souths Logan
270	Troy Lindsay	Redcliffe
258	Danny Coburn	Ipswich
253	Mick Roberts	Redcliffe, Norths Devils
242	James Wood	Tweed Heads
238	Guy Williams	Central Queensland
232	Matt King	Souths Logan, Tweed Heads
224	Brendon Lindsay	Logan, Gold Coast Vikings, Ipswich
219	Danny Burke	Brothers-Valleys, Redcliffe
218	Shane Perry	Brothers-Valleys, Logan, Redcliffe, Norths Devils
212	Wade Liddell	Easts Tigers, Souths Logan
210	Shane O'Flanagan	Wests Panthers, Burleigh
206	Tom Butterfield	Redcliffe, Easts Tigers, PNG Hunters
204	Cameron Durnford	Gold Coast Vikings, Logan, Wynnum Manly, Easts Tigers
203	John Te Reo	Toowoomba, Aspley Broncos, Wynnum Manly
202	Brett McPherson	Easts Tigers, Wynnum Manly
202	Shane Neumann	Sunshine Coast, Easts Tigers
200	Matt Seamark	Wynnum Manly, Redcliffe

==== At one club ====
Games	Player	Club
270	Troy Lindsay	Redcliffe
258	Danny Coburn	Ipswich
242	James Wood	Tweed Heads
238	Guy Williams	Central Queensland
196	Scott Sipple	Easts Tigers
176	Grant Flugge	Redcliffe
173	Luke Dalziel-Don	Wynnum Manly

=== Most tries ===
==== In a career ====
Rank	Tries	Player	Clubs
1	155	Daniel Ogden	North Devils, Wynnum Manly
2	142	Jonathon Reuben	Townsville Blackhawks North Devils, Wynnum Manly, Redcliffe, Ipswich
3	135	Nathanael Barnes	Tweed Heads, Wynnum Manly
4	119	Donald Malone	Easts Tigers, Ipswich, Mackay, Toowoomba
5	113	Nick Parfitt	Toowoomba, Burleigh
6	112	Ryan Cullen	Central Queensland, Redcliffe, Easts Tigers
7	107	Liam Georgetown	Redcliffe
7	107	James Wood	Tweed Heads
8	99	Heath Egglestone	Central Queensland
9	96	Shane Neumann	Sunshine Coast, Easts Tigers
10	95	Shane Perry	Brothers-Valleys, Logan, Redcliffe, Norths Devils

==== In a season ====
Tries	Player	Club	Season
34	Daniel Kennedy	Burleigh	2002

==== In a game ====
- 7 – Chris Walker, Toowoomba Clydesdales vs. Wests Panthers, Round 2, 2000
- 7 – Anthony Zipf, Norths Devils vs. Brothers-Valleys, Round 13, 2004

=== Most points ===
==== In a career ====
Rank	Points	Player	Clubs
1	1,421	Nick Parfitt	Toowoomba, Burleigh
2	1,255	Matt Seamark	Redcliffe, Wynnum Manly
3	1,247	Liam Georgetown	Redcliffe
4	1,150	Greg Bourke	Cairns, Burleigh, Wynnum Manly, Redcliffe
5	1,089	Reggie Cressbrook	Townsville Stingers, Burleigh, Ipswich
6	1,066	Brad Davis	Tweed Heads
7	1,030	Damian Richters	Sunshine Coast, Redcliffe
8	896	John Wilshere	Norths Devils, Easts Tigers
9	843	**Jamal Fogarty**	Burleigh, Tweed Heads
9	843	Liam Taylor	Mackay Cutters
11	834	Todd Murphy	Norths Devils, Easts Tigers, Redcliffe, Sunshine Coast

==== In a season ====
Points	Player	Club	Season
318	Liam Georgetown	Redcliffe	2012

==== In a game ====
- 40 – Damian Richters, Redcliffe Dolphins vs. Logan Scorpions, Round 5, 2002
- 40 – Greg Bourke, Burleigh Bears vs. Logan Scorpions, Round 17, 2002

=== Most goals ===
==== In a career ====
Rank	Goals	Player	Clubs
1	574	Matt Seamark	Redcliffe, Wynnum Manly
2	483	Nick Parfitt	Toowoomba, Burleigh
2	483	Brad Davis	Tweed Heads
4	409	Liam Georgetown	Redcliffe
5	403	Greg Bourke	Cairns, Burleigh, Wynnum Manly, Redcliffe
6	397	Damian Richters	Sunshine Coast, Redcliffe
7	366	Reggie Cressbrook	Townsville Stingers, Burleigh, Ipswich
8	346	John Wilshere	Norths Devils, Easts Tigers
9	317	Liam Taylor	Mackay Cutters
10	274	Damian Quinn	Toowoomba, Wynnum Manly

==== In a game ====
- 12 – Justin McKay, North Queensland Young Guns vs. Logan Scorpions, Round 3, 2002
- 12 – Greg Bourke, Burleigh Bears vs. Logan Scorpions, Round 17, 2002

== Coaching records ==
=== Most games ===
Games	Coach	Clubs
219	Ben Walker	Ipswich
219	Shane Walker	Ipswich
218	Jim Lenihan	Burleigh
218	Wayne Treleaven	Wests Panthers, Norths Devils
209	Rick Stone	Burleigh
166	Jon Buchanan	Wynnum Manly, Souths Logan
160	Neil Wharton	Redcliffe, Wynnum Manly
154	Craig Ingebrigtsen	Easts Tigers
152	Gary O'Brien	Logan, Brothers-Valleys, Redcliffe
150	Michael Booth	Bundaberg, Easts Tigers
144	Michael Marum	PNG Hunters

=== Best winning percentage ===
Win %	Coach	Clubs
70.8	Rick Stone	Burleigh
67.5	Kevin Walters	Toowoomba, Ipswich
66.3	Neil Wharton	Redcliffe, Wynnum Manly
59.9	John Dixon	Toowoomba, Redcliffe
59.4	Craig Ingebrigtsen	Easts Tigers, Sunshine Coast
59.4	Michael Marum	PNG Hunters
57.3	Adam Mogg	Sunshine Coast, Redcliffe
56.7	Jim Lenihan	Burleigh
56.6	Ben Walker	Ipswich
56.6	Shane Walker	Ipswich

== See also ==
- List of NRL records
- List of records in the National Youth Competition (rugby league)
- List of Brisbane Rugby League records
