= List of Queensland Cup honours =

The following Queensland Cup honours, excluding the Duncan Hall Medal, are awarded at the end of each regular season at the Queensland Rugby League's annual presentation evening. The Duncan Hall Medal is awarded after the Grand Final.

== Petero Civoniceva Medal ==
The Petero Civoniceva Medal is awarded to the Queensland Cup player voted as the best and fairest over the entire season. After each game, the referees award three votes to the best player, two votes to the second-best player, and one vote to the third-best player. Formerly known as The Courier Mail Medal, in 2018, the medal was renamed after former Australian and Queensland representative Petero Civoniceva.

Year	Nat	Winner	Club	Position
1996	(Australia)	Alan Wieland	Wests Panthers	Second-row
1997	(Australia)	Alan Wieland	Wests Panthers	Second-row
1998	(Australia)	Shane Perry	Logan Scorpions	Halfback
1999	(Australia)	Mick Roberts	Redcliffe Dolphins	Halfback
2000	(Italy)	Jason Bulgarelli	Wests Panthers	Centre
2001	(Australia)	Adam Mogg	Redcliffe Dolphins	Fullback
2002	(Australia)	Scott Thorburn	Easts Tigers	Halfback
2003	(Australia)	Denny Lambert	Wynnum Seagulls	Halfback
2004	(Australia)	Brent McConnell	Burleigh Bears	Halfback
2005	(Australia)	Greg Inglis	Norths Devils	Fullback
2006	(United States)	Brandon Costin	Souths Logan Magpies	Five-eighth
2007	(Australia)	Shannon Walker	Tweed Heads Seagulls	Fullback
2008	(Australia)	Nat Bowman	Central Comets	Five-eighth
2009	(Australia)	Scott Smith	Burleigh Bears	Hooker
2010	(Australia)	Daly Cherry-Evans	Sunshine Coast Sea Eagles	Halfback
2011	(Australia)	Javarn White	Norths Devils	Fullback
2012	(Australia)	Luke Capewell	Redcliffe Dolphins	Halfback
2013	(Australia)	Cody Walker	Easts Tigers	Five-eighth
2014	(Papua New Guinea)	Luke Page	Souths Logan Magpies	Prop
2015	(Australia)	Patrick Templeman	Wynnum Manly Seagulls	Five-eighth
2016	(Australia)	Josh Chudleigh	Mackay Cutters	Hooker
2017	(Papua New Guinea)	Ase Boas	PNG Hunters	Five-eighth
2018	(New Zealand)	Nathaniel Neale	Ipswich Jets	Prop
2019	(Australia)	Jamal Fogarty	Burleigh Bears	Halfback
2020	Not awarded			
2021	(Australia)	Jayden Berrell	Wynnum Manly Seagulls	Hooker
2022	(Australia)	Taine Tuaupiki	Burleigh Bears	Fullback
2023	(Australia)	Trai Fuller	Redcliffe Dolphins	Fullback
2024	(Papua New Guinea)	Judah Rimbu	PNG Hunters	Hooker
2025	(Australia)	Oliver Pascoe	Ipswich Jets	Hooker

== Duncan Hall Medal ==
Since 2007, the man of the match in the Queensland Cup Grand Final has been awarded the Duncan Hall Medal. The medal is named in honour of ARL Team of the Century member Duncan Hall, who played 24 games for Queensland and 22 games for Australia between 1948 and 1955.

Year	Nat	Winner	Club	Position
2007	(Australia)	Brad Davis	Tweed Heads Seagulls	Halfback
2008	(Samoa)	Albert Talipeau	Souths Logan Magpies	Halfback
2009	(Australia)	Tony Williams	Sunshine Coast Sea Eagles	Five-eighth
2010	(Australia)	Chris Sheppard	Northern Pride	Halfback
2011	(Australia)	Jake Granville	Wynnum Manly Seagulls	Fullback
2012	(Australia)	Luke Dalziel-Don	Wynnum Manly Seagulls	Lock
2013	(Australia)	Anthony Mitchell	Mackay Cutters	Hooker
2014	(Australia)	Shaun Nona	Northern Pride	Five-eighth
2015	(Scotland)	Billy McConnachie	Ipswich Jets	Second-row
2016	(Australia)	Cameron Cullen	Burleigh Bears	Five-eighth
2017	(Papua New Guinea)	Ase Boas	PNG Hunters	Five-eighth
2018	(Australia)	Toby Rudolf	Redcliffe Dolphins	Second-row
2019	(New Zealand)	Kurtis Rowe	Burleigh Bears	Fullback
2020	Not awarded			
2021	(Australia)	Michael Molo	Norths Devils	Prop
2022	(Australia)	Jacob Gagan	Norths Devils	Centre
2023	(New Zealand)	Keano Kini	Burleigh Bears	Fullback
2024	(Australia)	Tesi Niu	Norths Devils	Centre

== Representative Player of the Year ==
Not awarded after 2019

Year	Nat	Winner	Club	Representative team	Position
2005	(Australia)	Nathan Friend	Norths Devils	Queensland Residents	Hooker
2006	(Australia)	Mick Roberts	Redcliffe Dolphins	Queensland Residents	Hooker
2007	(Australia)	Shane Muspratt	North Queensland Young Guns	Queensland Residents	Five-eighth
2008	(New Zealand)	Isaak Ah Mau	Ipswich Jets	Queensland Residents	Prop
2009	(Australia)	Scott Smith	Burleigh Bears	Queensland Residents	Hooker
2010	(Australia)	Dayne Weston	Burleigh Bears	Queensland Residents	Prop
2011	(Australia)	Luke Capewell	Ipswich Jets	Queensland Residents	Fullback
2012	(Australia)	Grant Rovelli	Mackay Cutters	Queensland Residents	Five-eighth
2013	(Australia)	Nick Slyney	Redcliffe Dolphins	Queensland Residents	Lock
2014	(Australia)	Blake Leary	Northern Pride	Queensland Residents	Second-row
2015	(Australia)	Shaun Nona	Easts Tigers	Queensland Residents	Halfback
2016	(Australia)	Jai Arrow	Norths Devils	Queensland Residents	Lock
2017	(Australia)	Nick Slyney	Redcliffe Dolphins	Queensland Residents	Second-row
2018	(Australia)	David Fifita	Souths Logan Magpies	Queensland U18	Second-row
2019	(Papua New Guinea)	Xavier Coates	Tweed Heads Seagulls	Queensland U18	Wing

== Coach of the Year ==
Year	Nat	Winner	Club
2005	(Australia)	Wayne Treleaven	Norths Devils
2006	(Australia)	Anthony Griffin	Redcliffe Dolphins
2007	(Australia)	Anthony Griffin	Redcliffe Dolphins
2008	(Australia)	Kevin Walters	Ipswich Jets
2009	(Australia)	Paul Bramley	Souths Logan Magpies
2010	(Australia)	Mark Beaumont	Souths Logan Magpies
2011	(Australia)	Ben Anderson	Tweed Heads Seagulls
2012	(Australia)	Ben & Shane Walker	Ipswich Jets
2013	(Australia)	Jason Demetriou	Northern Pride
2014	(Australia)	Jon Buchanan	Wynnum Manly Seagulls
2015	(Papua New Guinea)	Michael Marum	PNG Hunters
2016	(Australia)	Jimmy Lenihan	Burleigh Bears
2017	(Papua New Guinea)	Michael Marum	PNG Hunters
2018	(Australia)	Ty Williams	Northern Pride
2019	(Australia)	Eric Smith	Sunshine Coast Falcons
2020		Not awarded	
2021	(Australia)	Rohan Smith	Norths Devils
2022	(Australia)	Lionel Harbin	Central Queensland Capras
2023	(Australia)	Karmichael Hunt	Souths Logan Magpies
2024	(Australia)	Eric Smith	Northern Pride
2025	(Australia)	Terry Campese	Townsville Blackhawks

== Rookie of the Year ==
Year	Nat	Winner	Club	Position
1996	(Australia)	Brendan Liston	Easts Tigers	-
1997	(Australia)	Jason Campbell	Wests Panthers	-
1998	(Australia)	Jamie Tomlinson	Redcliffe Dolphins	-
1999	(Australia)	David Seage	Wynnum Manly Seagulls	Fullback
2000	(Australia)	Brook Martin	Easts Tigers	Wing
2001	(Australia)	Martin Allen	Easts Tigers	Second-row
2002	(Australia)	David Stagg	Redcliffe Dolphins	Second-row
2003	(Australia)	Stanley Fau	Souths Logan Magpies	Prop
2004	(Australia)	Luke Dalziel-Don	Wynnum Manly Seagulls	Lock
2005	(Papua New Guinea)	Wayne Bond	Redcliffe Dolphins	Halfback
2006	(Australia)	David Tyrrell	Easts Tigers	Wing
2007	(Australia)	Shannon Walker	Tweed Heads Seagulls	Fullback
2008	(New Zealand)	Fred Tila	Easts Tigers	Prop
2009	(Australia)	Matt Gillett	Norths Devils	Second-row
2010	(Australia)	Daly Cherry-Evans	Sunshine Coast Sea Eagles	Halfback
2011	(Australia)	Josh Starling	Tweed Heads Seagulls	Prop
2012	(Australia)	Ethan Lowe	Northern Pride	Second-row
2013	(Australia)	Cameron Munster	CQ Capras	Fullback
2014	(Papua New Guinea)	Garry Lo	PNG Hunters	Wing
2015	(Australia)	Aaron Rockley	Wynnum Manly Seagulls	Prop
2016	(Australia)	Jonus Pearson	Redcliffe Dolphins	Wing
2017	(New Zealand)	Brandon Smith	Sunshine Coast Falcons	Hooker
2018	(Australia)	Jake Clifford	Northern Pride	Halfback
2019	(Australia)	Tom Gilbert	Townsville Blackhawks	Lock
2020		Not awarded		
2021	(Australia)	Ezra Mam	Souths Logan Magpies	Five-eighth
2022	(Australia)	Taine Tuaupiki	Burleigh Bears	Fullback
2023	(Papua New Guinea)	Morea Morea	Papua New Guinea Hunters	Fullback
2024	(Australia)	Latrell Siegwalt	Redcliffe Dolphins	Fullback
2025	(Australia)	Zion Johnson	Sunshine Coast Falcons	Wing

== XXXX People's Choice Award ==
The XXXX People's Choice Award is given to the player who polls the most votes from fans. All 14 Queensland Cup clubs nominate one player to be in the running for the award. The award was discontinued after 2017.

Year	Nat	Winner	Club	Position
2013	(Australia)	Hezron Murgha	Northern Pride	Fullback
2014	(Papua New Guinea)	Willie Minoga	PNG Hunters	Second-row
2015	(Papua New Guinea)	Wartovo Puara	PNG Hunters	Hooker
2016	(Papua New Guinea)	Justin Olam	PNG Hunters	Wing
2017	(Papua New Guinea)	Ase Boas	PNG Hunters	Five-eighth

== Top Point Scorer ==
Year	Nat	Winner	Club	Position	Points
2007	(Australia)	Nick Parfitt	Burleigh Bears	Fullback	-
2008	(Australia)	Nick Parfitt	Burleigh Bears	Fullback	-
2009	(Australia)	Liam Georgetown	Redcliffe Dolphins	Fullback	-
2010	(New Zealand)	Troyden Watene	Norths Devils	Second-row	188
2011	(Australia)	Liam Georgetown	Redcliffe Dolphins	Fullback	206
2012	(Australia)	Liam Georgetown	Redcliffe Dolphins	Fullback	300
2013	(Australia)	Cody Walker	Easts Tigers	Five-eighth	171
2014	(Australia)	Khan Ahwang	Burleigh Bears	Wing	201
2015	(Australia)	Luke Capewell	Redcliffe Dolphins	Five-eighth	208
2016	(Australia)	Darren Nicholls	Redcliffe Dolphins	Halfback	258
2017	(Australia)	Carlin Anderson	Townsville Blackhawks	Fullback	220
2018	(Australia)	Guy Hamilton	Souths Logan Magpies	Five-eighth	176
2019	(Australia)	Todd Murphy	Sunshine Coast Falcons	Halfback	270
2020		Not awarded			
2021	(Australia)	Todd Murphy	Sunshine Coast Falcons	Halfback	160
2022	(Australia)	Josh Rogers	Burleigh Bears	Five-eighth	250
2023	(Australia)	Josh Rogers	Wynnum Manly Seagulls	Five-eighth	241
2024	(Australia)	Tom Duffy	Northern Pride	Halfback	216
2025	(Australia)	Latrell Siegwalt	Souths Logan Magpies	Fullback	182

== Top Try Scorer ==
Year	Nat	Winner	Club	Position	Tries
2007	(Australia) (New Zealand)	Rory Bromley; John Tamanika	Redcliffe Dolphins; Easts Tigers	Wing; Wing	- -
2008	(Australia)	Adam Fielder	Burleigh Bears	Wing	-
2009	(Australia)	Tom Humble	Northern Pride	Five-eighth	-
2010	(Australia)	Daniel Ogden	Norths Devils	Wing	19
2011	(Australia)	Javarn White	Norths Devils	Fullback	20
2012	(Australia)	Liam Georgetown	Redcliffe Dolphins	Fullback	29
2013	(Australia)	Davin Crampton	Northern Pride	Centre	18
2014	(Papua New Guinea)	Garry Lo	PNG Hunters	Wing	24
2015	(Australia)	Marmin Barba	Ipswich Jets	Wing	27
2016	(Australia)	Jonathon Reuben	Townsville Blackhawks	Wing	18
2017	(Australia)	Jonathon Reuben	Townsville Blackhawks	Wing	26
2018	(Australia) (Australia)	Daniel Ogden; Michael Purcell	Wynnum Manly Seagulls; Ipswich Jets	Wing; Fullback	19; 19
2019	(Australia) (Australia)	Jonathon Reuben; Matt Soper-Lawler	Sunshine Coast Falcons; Souths Logan Magpies	Wing; Wing	23; 23
2020	Not awarded				
2021	(Australia)	Jonathon Reuben	Sunshine Coast Falcons	Wing	14
2022	(Australia)	Alofiana Khan-Pereira	Burleigh Bears	Wing	25
2023	(Australia)	Jonathon Reuben	Norths Devils	Wing	20
2024	(Australia)	Manase Kaho	Norths Devils	Wing	21
2025	(Papua New Guinea)	Dudley Dotoi	Townsville Blackhawks	Wing	26

== Team of the Year ==
=== 2015 ===
Position	Nat	Winner	Club
Fullback	(New Zealand)	Jahrome Hughes	Townsville Blackhawks
Wing	(Australia)	Marmin Barba	Ipswich Jets
Centre	(Australia)	Kyle Feldt	Townsville Blackhawks
Five-eighth	(Papua New Guinea)	Israel Eliab	PNG Hunters
Halfback	(Australia)	Michael Parker-Walshe	Townsville Blackhawks
Prop	(Australia)	Daniel Beasley	Townsville Blackhawks
Hooker	(Australia)	Josh Chudleigh	Mackay Cutters
Second-row	(New Zealand)	Anthony Cherrington	Redcliffe Dolphins
Lock	(Australia)	Mitchell Frei	Wynnum Manly Seagulls

=== 2016 ===
Position	Nat	Winner	Club
Fullback	(New Zealand)	Jahrome Hughes	Townsville Blackhawks
Wing	(Australia)	Jonus Pearson	Redcliffe Dolphins
Centre	(Tonga)	Mosese Pangai	Townsville Blackhawks
Five-eighth	(Australia)	Cameron Cullen	Burleigh Bears
Halfback	(Australia)	Jamal Fogarty	Burleigh Bears
Prop	(Australia)	Sam Anderson	Redcliffe Dolphins
Hooker	(Australia)	Josh Chudleigh	Mackay Cutters
Second-row	(Papua New Guinea)	Rhyse Martin	Townsville Blackhawks
Lock	(Australia)	Jai Arrow	Norths Devils

=== 2017 ===
Position	Nat	Winner	Club
Fullback	(New Zealand)	Jamayne Isaako	Souths Logan Magpies
Wing	(Australia)	Jonathon Reuben	Townsville Blackhawks
Centre	(Papua New Guinea)	Justin Olam	Sunshine Coast Falcons
Five-eighth	(Australia)	Billy Walters	Easts Tigers
Halfback	(Australia)	Brodie Croft	Easts Tigers
Prop	(Australia)	Matthew Lodge	Redcliffe Dolphins
Hooker	(Tonga)	Pat Politoni	Burleigh Bears
Second-row	(Australia)	Blake Leary	Townsville Blackhawks
Lock	(Australia)	Sam Anderson	Redcliffe Dolphins

=== 2018 ===
Position	Nat	Winner	Club
Fullback	(Australia)	Scott Drinkwater	Easts Tigers
Wing	(New Zealand)	Kalifa Faifai Loa	Townsville Blackhawks
Centre	(Australia)	Kotoni Staggs	Redcliffe Dolphins
Five-eighth	(Australia)	Billy Walters	Easts Tigers
Halfback	(Australia)	Jake Clifford	Northern Pride
Prop	(New Zealand)	Nathaniel Neale	Ipswich Jets
Hooker	(Tonga)	Pat Politoni	Burleigh Bears
Second-row	(Australia)	Patrick Kaufusi	Easts Tigers
Lock	(Australia)	Jamil Hopoate	Redcliffe Dolphins

=== 2019 ===
Position	Nat	Winner	Club
Fullback	(Papua New Guinea)	Edene Gebbie	Wynnum Manly Seagulls
Wing	(Australia)	Jonathon Reuben	Sunshine Coast Falcons
Centre	(Australia)	Izaia Perese	Redcliffe Dolphins
Five-eighth	(Australia)	Patrick Templeman	Wynnum Manly Seagulls
Halfback	(Australia)	Todd Murphy	Sunshine Coast Falcons
Prop	(Australia)	Jordan Grant	Redcliffe Dolphins
Hooker	(Australia)	Harry Grant	Sunshine Coast Falcons
Second-row	(Australia)	Chris Lewis	Sunshine Coast Falcons
Lock	(Australia)	Tom Gilbert	Townsville Blackhawks

=== 2020 ===
Not awarded

=== 2021 ===
Position	Nat	Winner	Club
Fullback	(Australia)	Trai Fuller	Redcliffe Dolphins
Wing	(Australia)	Jonathon Reuben	Norths Devils
Centre	(Australia)	Sami Sauiluma	Burleigh Bears
Five-eighth	(Australia)	Jack Campagnolo	Wynnum Manly Seagulls
Halfback	(Australia)	Jack Ahearn	Norths Devils
Prop	(New Zealand)	Nathaniel Neale	Ipswich Jets
Hooker	(Australia)	Jayden Berrell	Wynnum Manly Seagulls
Second-row	(Australia)	Josh Stuckey	Northern Pride
Lock	(Australia)	Luke Bateman	Wynnum Manly Seagulls

=== 2022 ===
Position	Nat	Winner	Club
Fullback	(Australia)	Taine Tuaupiki	Burleigh Bears
Wing	(Australia)	Alofiana Khan-Pereira	Burleigh Bears
Centre	(New Zealand)	Valynce Te Whare	Redcliffe Dolphins
Five-eighth	(Australia)	Josh Rogers	Burleigh Bears
Halfback	(Australia)	Guy Hamilton	Burleigh Bears
Prop	(New Zealand)	Nick Lui-Toso	Northern Pride
Hooker	(Australia)	Tyson Smoothy	Sunshine Coast Falcons
Second-row	(Papua New Guinea)	Nixon Putt	Central Queensland Capras
Lock	(Australia)	Sam Coster	Burleigh Bears

=== 2023 ===
Position	Nat	Winner	Club
Fullback	(Australia)	Tristan Sailor	Souths Logan Magpies
Wing	(New Zealand)	Jordan Pereira	Souths Logan Magpies
Centre	(New Zealand)	Deine Mariner	Wynnum Manly Seagulls
Five-eighth	(Australia)	Josh Rogers	Wynnum Manly Seagulls
Halfback	(Italy)	Jack Campagnolo	Souths Logan Magpies
Prop	(Australia)	Bailey Butler	Central Queensland Capras
Hooker	(Australia)	Trey Brown	Central Queensland Capras
Second-row	(Papua New Guinea)	Jacob Alick	Burleigh Bears
Lock	(Australia)	Sam Coster	Burleigh Bears

=== 2024 ===
Position	Nat	Winner	Club
Fullback	(Australia)	Trai Fuller	Redcliffe Dolphins
Wing	(Australia)	Manase Kaho	Norths Devils
Centre	(Australia)	Ethan Quai-Ward	Souths Logan Magpies
Five-eighth	(Australia)	Jake Clifford	Northern Pride
Halfback	(Australia)	Tom Duffy	Northern Pride
Prop	(Australia)	Tukimihia Simpkins	Norths Devils
Hooker	(Australia)	Cory Paix	Wynnum Manly Seagulls
Second-row	(New Zealand)	Dane Aukafolau	Northern Pride
Lock	(Australia)	Sam Coster	Burleigh Bears

=== 2024 ===
Position	Nat	Winner	Club
Fullback	(Australia)	Ben Farr	Wynnum Manly Seagulls
Wing	(Papua New Guinea)	Dudley Dotoi	Townsville Blackhawks
Centre	(Australia)	Josh Smith	Brisbane Tigers
Five-eighth	(Australia)	Anthony Milford	Souths Logan Magpies
Halfback	(Australia)	Guy Hamilton	Burleigh Bears
Prop	(Australia)	Josh Stuckey	Townsville Blackhawks
Hooker	(Australia)	Oliver Pascoe	Ipswich Jets
Second-row	(New Zealand)	Dane Aukafolau	Northern Pride
Lock	(Australia)	Sam Coster	Burleigh Bears

== See also ==
- Queensland Cup
- Queensland Residents rugby league team
