= 2005 Queensland Cup =

- Duration: March 12 – September 17, 2005
- Teams: 11
- Premiers: North Queensland Young Guns (1st title)
- Minor premiers: North Queensland Young Guns (1st title)
- Matches played: 116
- Points scored: 6,216
- Top points scorer: Reggie Cressbrook (206)
- Player of the year: Greg Inglis (Courier Mail Medal)
- Top try-scorer: Simon Phillips (19)

The 2005 Queensland Cup season was the 10th season of Queensland's top-level statewide rugby league competition run by the Queensland Rugby League in Queensland, Australia. The competition, known as the Queensland Wizard Cup due to sponsorship from Wizard Home Loans featured 11 teams playing a 26-week long season (including finals) from March to September.

The North Queensland Cowboys finished as minor premiers and defeated the Burleigh Bears 36–6 in the Grand Final at Suncorp Stadium to claim their first premiership. Norths Devils fullback Greg Inglis was named the competition's Player of the Year, winning the Courier Mail Medal.

== Teams ==
Brothers-Valleys, who joined the competition in 2004, withdrew after just one season and were not replaced, with the competition featuring 11 teams for the first time since 2001.

The Brisbane Broncos, Melbourne Storm and North Queensland Cowboys were again affiliated with the Toowoomba Clydesdales, Norths Devils and North Queensland Young Guns respectively.

Colours	Club	Home ground(s)	Head coach (s)	Captain (s)	NRL affiliate
	Burleigh Bears	Pizzey Park	Rick Stone	Ali Brown	None
	Central Comets	Browne Park	Neale Crow	Mark Henry	None
	Easts Tigers	Langlands Park	Michael Booth	Brandon Costin	None
	Ipswich Jets	QLD Group Stadium	Trevor Gillmeister	Danny Coburn	None
	North Queensland Young Guns	Dairy Farmers Stadium	Grant Bell	Daniel Strickland	North Queensland Cowboys
	Norths Devils	Bishop Park	Wayne Treleaven	Anthony Boyd	Melbourne Storm
	Redcliffe Dolphins	Dolphin Oval	Anthony Griffin	Shane Perry	None
	Souths Logan Magpies	Davies Park, Brandon Park	Phil Economidis	Darren Glase	None
	Toowoomba Clydesdales	Clive Berghofer Stadium	John Dixon	Anthony Seibold	Brisbane Broncos
	Tweed Heads Seagulls	Piggabeen Sports Complex	Steve Murphy	Andrew Moroney	None
	Wynnum Seagulls	Kougari Oval	Neil Wharton	Jace van Dijk	None

== Ladder ==
2005 Queensland Cup
Pos	Team	Pld	W	D	L	B	PF	PA	PD	Pts
1	North Queensland Young Guns (P)	20	16	1	3	2	612	352	+260	33
2	Norths Devils	20	15	1	4	2	719	454	+265	31
3	Burleigh Bears	20	15	0	5	2	644	354	+290	30
4	Redcliffe Dolphins	20	12	0	8	2	582	510	+72	24
5	Toowoomba Clydesdales	20	11	1	8	2	663	527	+136	23
6	Wynnum Seagulls	20	10	0	10	2	480	554	-74	20
7	Tweed Heads Seagulls	20	8	3	9	2	556	485	+71	19
8	Easts Tigers	20	9	0	11	2	591	504	+87	18
9	Ipswich Jets	20	5	1	14	2	414	566	-152	11
10	Souths Logan Magpies	20	3	1	16	2	364	836	-472	7
11	Central Comets	20	1	2	17	2	346	829	-483	4

== Finals series ==
Home	Score	Away	Match information
Home	Score	Away	Date	Venue
Qualifying / Elimination Finals
Redcliffe Dolphins	23 – 22†	Toowoomba Clydesdales	27 August 2005	Dolphin Oval
Norths Devils	18 – 26	Burleigh Bears	28 August 2005	Bishop Park
Semi-finals
Norths Devils	10 – 33	Redcliffe Dolphins	3 September 2005	Bishop Park
North Queensland Young Guns	22 – 6	Burleigh Bears	3 September 2005	Dairy Farmers Stadium
Preliminary Final
Burleigh Bears	24 – 19	Redcliffe Dolphins	10 September 2005	Pizzey Park
Grand Final
North Queensland Young Guns	36 – 6	Burleigh Bears	17 September 2005	Suncorp Stadium

† Match decided in extra time.

Qualifying / Elimination Finals
2	Norths	18
3	Burleigh	26
4	Redcliffe	23
5	Toowoomba	22

Major / Minor Semi-finals
1	North Qld	22
Burleigh	6
Norths	10
Redcliffe	33

Preliminary Final
Burleigh	24
Redcliffe	19

Grand Final
North Qld	36
Burleigh	6

== Grand Final ==
Saturday, 17 September

North Queensland Young Guns	36 – 6	Burleigh Bears
Tries: David Myles 2 Clint Amos 1 Jason Barsley 1 Shane Muspratt 1 Neil Sweeney 1 Goals: Neil Sweeney 6	1st: 18 - 6; 2nd: 18 - 0 Report	Tries: 1 Trent Leis; Goals: 1 Reggie Cressbrook

Suncorp Stadium
Attendance: 6,893
Referee: Rob Alexander
Player of the Match: Shane Muspratt (North Queensland)

North Queensland Young Guns	Position	Burleigh Bears
Jason Barsley	FB	Reggie Cressbrook
Neil Sweeney	WG	Balin Cupples
Gavin Cooper	CE	Nick Shaw
David Myles	CE	Trent Leis
Dean Payne	WG	Aseri Laing
Shane Muspratt	FE	Adam Hayden
Brent McConnell	HB	David Hicks
Jaiman Lowe	PR	Ali Brown (c)
Clint Amos	HK	Ryan Gundry
Matthew Scott	PR	Shane O'Flanagan
Daniel Strickland (c)	SR	Martin Griese
Mark Dalle Cort	SR	Adam Hutchison
Leigh McWilliams	LK	Adrian Vowles
Rory Bromley	Bench	James Griffiths
Scott Bolton	Bench	Jeremy Lateo
Wallace Solomona	Bench	Chris Barnes
James Andersen	Bench	Robert Apanui
Grant Bell	Coach	Rick Stone

North Queensland took out the minor premiership and qualified for the finals for the first time since joining the Queensland Cup in 2002, losing just three games in the regular season. In the finals, they defeated Burleigh in the major semi final to book a spot in their first Grand Final. Defending premiers Burleigh, who finished the season in 3rd, defeated Norths in the Week 1 qualifying final to set up a contest with the Young Guns. After losing, the Bears hosted Redcliffe, defeating them 24–19 and qualifying for their third straight Grand Final.

=== First half ===
The Young Guns opened the scoring in the 8th minute, when Neil Sweeney kicked a penalty goal after prop Jaiman Lowe was taken high by Bears' second rower Adam Hutchison. Seven minutes later, North Queensland recorded the first try of the game when centre David Myles sliced through some soft defence to score. They extended their lead to 12–0 when five-eighth Shane Muspratt burrowed over from dummy half to score. In the 28th minute, Burleigh finally got on the board thanks to a long range try to former North Queensland Cowboy Trent Leis. Two minutes before half time, the Young Guns extended their lead to 12 when Neil Sweeney scored under the posts thanks to a Brent McConnell line break.

=== Second half ===
The second half was scoreless until the final 10 minutes, when the Young Guns ran in three unanswered tries on their way to their first premiership. In the 70th minute, hooker Clint Amos dived over from dummy half, pushing the lead to 18. From the set following the kick off, captain Daniel Strickland burst through the Bears' defensive line and sent fullback Jason Barsley away to score under the posts. Finally, in the 76th minute, a McConnell chip kick was regathered by Muspratt, who kept it alive, with the ball going through five sets of hands before Myles finished the play for his second try. The win marked the first time a team from outside of south east Queensland would win the Grand Final.

Three players from the victorious Young Guns' side, Gavin Cooper, Matthew Scott and Scott Bolton, would go on to become club legends for the North Queensland Cowboys, with all three winning an NRL premiership with the club in 2015.

== Player statistics ==
=== Leading try scorers ===
Pos	Player	Team	Tries
1	Simon Phillips	Wynnum Seagulls	19
2	Greg Inglis	Norths Devils	18
3	Tony Duggan	Toowoomba Clydesdales	16
4	Trent Leis	Burleigh Bears	15
4	Damien Quinn	Wynnum Seagulls	15
4	David Strachan	Tweed Heads Seagulls	15

=== Leading point scorers ===
Pos	Player	Team	T	G	FG	Pts
1	Reggie Cressbrook	Burleigh Bears	14	75	-	206
2	Greg Bourke	Redcliffe Dolphins	6	72	-	168
3	Damien Quinn	Wynnum Seagulls	15	50	-	160
4	Nick Parfitt	Toowoomba Clydesdales	12	55	-	158
5	Greg Inglis	Norths Devils	18	39	-	150

== End-of-season awards ==
- Courier Mail Medal: Greg Inglis ( Norths Devils)
- Coach of the Year: Wayne Treleaven ( Norths Devils)
- Rookie of the Year: Wayne Bond ( Redcliffe Dolphins)
- Representative Player of the Year: Nathan Friend ( Queensland Residents, Norths Devils)

== See also ==
- Queensland Cup
- Queensland Rugby League
