= 2006 Queensland Cup =

Rugby league competition

- Duration: March 11 – September 16, 2006
- Teams: 11
- Premiers: Redcliffe Dolphins (5th title)
- Minor premiers: Toowoomba Clydesdales (3rd title)
- Matches played: 116
- Points scored: 5,972
- Player of the year: Brandon Costin (Courier Mail Medal)

The 2006 Queensland Cup season was the 11th season of top-level statewide rugby league competition run by the Queensland Rugby League in Queensland, Australia. The competition, known as the Queensland Wizard Cup due to sponsorship from Wizard Home Loans featured 11 teams playing a 26-week long season (including finals) from March to September.

The Redcliffe Dolphins won their fifth premiership, defeating the Toowoomba Clydesdales 27–6 at Suncorp Stadium. Souths Logan Magpies five-eighth Brandon Costin was named the competition's Player of the Year, winning the Courier Mail Medal.

== Teams ==
In 2006, the Queensland Cup retained the same 11 teams that competed in the 2005 season. The Wynnum Seagulls, who played under that name from 1995 to 2005, returned to playing as the Wynnum Manly Seagulls.

Colours	Club	Home ground(s)	Head coach(s)	Captain(s)	NRL Affiliate
	Burleigh Bears	Pizzey Park	Jim Lenihan	Ryan Gundry	None
	Central Comets	Browne Park	Matt Parish	Herewini Rangi	None
	Easts Tigers	Langlands Park	Michael Booth	Matt Lockyer	None
	Ipswich Jets	QLD Group Stadium	Trevor Gillmeister	Danny Coburn	None
	North Queensland Young Guns	Dairy Farmers Stadium	Michael Crawley	Daniel Strickland	North Queensland Cowboys
	Norths Devils	Bishop Park	Wayne Treleaven	Anthony Boyd	Melbourne Storm
	Redcliffe Dolphins	Dolphin Oval	Anthony Griffin	Troy Lindsay	Brisbane Broncos
	Souths Logan Magpies	Brandon Park	Mark Gliddon	Brandon Costin	None
	Toowoomba Clydesdales	Clive Berghofer Stadium	Mark Gee	Nick Kenny	Brisbane Broncos
	Tweed Heads Seagulls	Piggabeen Sports Complex	Steve Murphy	Matt King	None
	Wynnum Manly Seagulls	Kougari Oval	Neil Wharton	Jimmy Ahmat	None

== Ladder ==
2006 Queensland Cup
Pos	Team	Pld	W	D	L	B	PF	PA	PD	Pts
1	Toowoomba Clydesdales	20	16	0	4	2	680	462	+218	32
2	North Queensland Young Guns	20	14	2	4	2	604	392	+212	30
3	Redcliffe Dolphins (P)	20	14	0	6	2	619	434	+185	28
4	Tweed Heads Seagulls	20	11	0	9	2	473	455	+18	22
5	Easts Tigers	20	10	2	8	2	505	490	+15	22
6	Burleigh Bears	20	9	3	8	2	429	435	-6	21
7	Norths Devils	20	8	1	11	2	538	570	-32	17
8	Central Comets	20	7	1	12	2	409	560	-151	15
9	Wynnum Manly Seagulls	20	5	3	12	2	483	562	-79	13
10	Souths Logan Magpies	20	5	2	13	2	497	632	-135	12
11	Ipswich Jets	20	4	0	16	2	486	731	-245	8

== Finals series ==
Home	Score	Away	Match Information
Home	Score	Away	Date	Venue
Qualifying / Elimination Finals
Tweed Heads Seagulls	4 – 12	Easts Tigers	26 August 2006	Piggabeen Sports Complex
North Queensland Young Guns	8 – 22	Redcliffe Dolphins	27 August 2006	Townsville Sports Reserve
Semi-finals
North Queensland Young Guns	18 – 28	Easts Tigers	1 September 2006	Dairy Farmers Stadium
Toowoomba Clydesdales	56 – 22	Redcliffe Dolphins	2 September 2006	Clive Berghofer Stadium
Preliminary Final
Redcliffe Dolphins	30 – 16	Easts Tigers	9 September 2006	Dolphin Oval
Grand Final
Toowoomba Clydesdales	6 – 27	Redcliffe Dolphins	16 September 2006	Suncorp Stadium

Qualifying / Elimination Finals
2	North Qld	8
3	Redcliffe	22
4	Tweed Heads	4
5	Easts	12

Major / Minor Semi-finals
1	Toowoomba	56
Redcliffe	22
North Qld	18
Easts	28

Preliminary Final
Redcliffe	30
Easts	16

Grand Final
Toowoomba	6
Redcliffe	27

== Grand Final ==
Saturday, 16 September

Toowoomba Clydesdales	6 – 27	Redcliffe Dolphins
Tries: Ben Vaeau 1 Goals: Nick Parfitt 1	1st: 6 - 12; 2nd: 0 - 15; Report	Tries: 2 Rory Bromley; 1 Ryan Cullen; 1 Mark Shipway; 1 Marty Turner; Goals: 3 Greg Bourke; Field Goals: 1 Mick Roberts

Suncorp Stadium
Referee: Brett Suttor
Player of the Match: Mick Roberts (Redcliffe)

Toowoomba Clydesdales	Position	Redcliffe Dolphins
Nick Parfitt	FB	Ryan Cullen
Denan Kemp	WG	Chris Giumelli
Jason Moon	CE	Greg Bourke
Jamie Simpson	CE	Nick Emmett
Steve Michaels	WG	Rory Bromley
Joel Moon	FE	Chris Fox
Ben Green	HB	Marty Turner
Nick Kenny (c)	PR	Troy Lindsay (c)
John Te Reo	HK	Mick Roberts
Ben Vaeau	PR	Adam Starr
Chris Muckert	SR	Grant Flugge
Derrick Watkins	SR	Danny Burke
Greg Eastwood	LK	Mark Shipway
David Taylor	Bench	Nick Walker
Joe Clarke	Bench	Shannon Fish
Lynden Murphy	Bench	Daniel Green
Lachlan Morgan	Bench	Gerard Parle
Mark Gee	Coach	Anthony Griffin

Toowoomba finished the regular season as minor premiers and charged into the Grand Final after a dominant 56–22 win over Redcliffe in the major semi final. Redcliffe ended the season in 3rd place and upset the 2nd place North Queensland Young Guns 22–8 in the first week of the finals. After the big loss to Toowoomba, the Dolphins defeated Easts 30–16 to qualify for their eighth Grand Final and their fourth against the Clydesdales. In the regular season, Toowoomba defeated Redcliffe 42–28 in Round 8, while the Dolphins won the return match 34–16 in Round 18.

=== First half ===
Toowoomba prop Ben Vaeau opened the scoring in just the 3rd minute of the contest when he steamrolled through the Dolphins defence from 10 metres out to score. Redcliffe hit back in the 8th minute when halfback Marty Turner stepped through some soft defence to score under the posts. With 10 seconds remaining in what was a tough first half, the Dolphins took the lead when fullback Ryan Cullen went through under the posts to score. The Dolphins taking a 12–6 lead into the half time break.

=== Second half ===
Redcliffe maintained their narrow six-point lead for most of the second half, before hooker Mick Roberts kicked a field goal in the 67th minute to extended his side's lead to seven. Just over a minute later the Dolphins had their third try of the game when centre Nick Emmett batted down a Roberts' cross-field kick to his winger Rory Bromley who scored in the corner. Redcliffe pulled off a carbon copy of the try five minutes later when Emmett brought down a Turner kick and handed it off to Bromley who got his second. With two minutes remaining, Mark Shipway scored to seal the contest for Redcliffe and secure their fifth Queensland Cup premiership.

The 2006 Grand Final would be the last game the Toowoomba Clydesdales would ever play in the Queensland Cup. One of the foundation clubs of the competition, the Clydesdales ceased operations at the end of the year due to financial reasons.

== End-of-season awards ==
- Courier Mail Medal (Best and Fairest): Brandon Costin ( Souths Logan Magpies)
- Coach of the Year: Anthony Griffin ( Redcliffe Dolphins)
- Rookie of the Year: David Tyrrell ( Easts Tigers)
- Representative Player of the Year: Mick Roberts ( Queensland Residents, Redcliffe Dolphins)

== See also ==
- Queensland Cup
- Queensland Rugby League
