= 2003 Queensland Cup =

- Duration: March 15 – September 20, 2003
- Teams: 12
- Premiers: Redcliffe Dolphins (4th title)
- Minor premiers: Burleigh Bears (1st title)
- Matches played: 138
- Points scored: 7,799
- Top points scorer: Steven West (264)
- Player of the year: Denny Lambert (Courier Mail Medal)
- Top try-scorer: Aaron Barba (33)

The 2003 Queensland Cup season was the 8th season of Queensland's top-level statewide rugby league competition run by the Queensland Rugby League in Australia. The competition featured 12 teams playing a 26-week long season (including finals) from March to September.

The Redcliffe Dolphins defeated the Burleigh Bears 31–18 in the Grand Final at Dolphin Oval, becoming the first club to win back-to-back premierships. Wynnum halfback Denny Lambert was named the competition's Player of the Year, winning the Courier Mail Medal.

== Teams ==
The Tweed Heads Seagulls, the oldest provincial club in Australia, gained entry to the competition for the 2003 season. The club applied for the 2002 season but were unsuccessful. They re-applied after the Logan Scorpions, an inaugural Queensland Cup club, ceased operations. Seagulls became the first New South Wales-based team to enter the competition. Souths Magpies acquired what remained of the Logan club and re-branded as the Souths Logan Magpies. Also in 2003, the East Coast Tigers reverted to their original name, Easts Tigers, after two seasons.

The Brisbane Broncos, Melbourne Storm and North Queensland Cowboys were again affiliated with the Toowoomba Clydesdales, Norths Devils and North Queensland Young Guns respectively.

Colours	Club	Home ground(s)
	Burleigh Bears	Pizzey Park
	Central Comets	Browne Park
	Easts Tigers	Langlands Park
	Ipswich Jets	Bendigo Bank Oval
	North Queensland Young Guns	Dairy Farmers Stadium
	Norths Devils	Bishop Park
	Redcliffe Dolphins	Dolphin Oval
	Souths Logan Magpies	Davies Park
	Toowoomba Clydesdales	Stadium Toowoomba, Suncorp Stadium
	Tweed Heads Seagulls	Piggabeen Sports Complex
	Wests Panthers	Purtell Park
	Wynnum Seagulls	Kougari Oval

== Ladder ==
2003 Queensland Cup
Pos	Team	Pld	W	D	L	PF	PA	PD	Pts
1	Burleigh Bears	22	16	1	5	707	366	+341	33
2	Redcliffe Dolphins (P)	22	16	1	5	789	486	+303	33
3	Ipswich Jets	22	15	1	6	732	465	+267	31
4	Wynnum Seagulls	22	15	1	6	700	536	+164	31
5	Tweed Heads Seagulls	22	14	0	8	606	564	+42	28
6	Toowoomba Clydesdales	22	11	1	10	738	591	+147	23
7	North Queensland Young Guns	22	11	0	11	638	457	+181	22
8	Norths Devils	22	10	1	11	615	589	+26	21
9	Easts Tigers	22	10	0	12	626	641	-15	20
10	Central Comets	22	7	0	15	466	749	-283	14
11	Souths Logan Magpies	22	4	0	18	484	978	-494	8
12	Wests Panthers	22	0	0	22	361	1040	-679	0

== Finals series ==
Home	Score	Away	Match Information
Home	Score	Away	Date	Venue
Qualifying / Elimination Finals
Wynnum Seagulls	40 – 22	Tweed Heads Seagulls	30 August 2003	Kougari Oval
Redcliffe Dolphins	28 – 22	Ipswich Jets	31 August 2003	Dolphin Oval
Semi-finals
Burleigh Bears	26 – 24	Redcliffe Dolphins	6 September 2003	Pizzey Park
Ipswich Jets	12 – 42	Wynnum Seagulls	6 September 2003	Bendigo Bank Oval
Preliminary Final
Redcliffe Dolphins	46 – 26	Wynnum Seagulls	13 September 2003	Dolphin Oval
Grand Final
Burleigh Bears	18 – 31	Redcliffe Dolphins	20 September 2003	Dolphin Oval

Qualifying / Elimination Finals
2	Redcliffe	28
3	Ipswich	22
4	Wynnum	40
5	Tweed Heads	22

Major / Minor Semi-finals
1	Burleigh	26
Redcliffe	24
Ipswich	12
Wynnum	42

Preliminary Final
Redcliffe	46
Wynnum	26

Grand Final
Burleigh	18
Redcliffe	31

== Grand Final ==
Saturday, 30 September

Burleigh Bears	18 – 31	Redcliffe Dolphins
Tries: Reggie Cressbrook 1 Tony Gray 1 Trent Purdon 1 Goals: Reggie Cressbrook 3	1st: 6 - 20; 2nd: 12 - 11	Tries: 3 Aaron Barba; 1 Brian Jellick; 1 Ben Jones; Goals: 5 Justin McKay; Field Goals: 1 Shane Perry

Dolphin Oval
Attendance: 7,000
Referee: Adam Neale
Player of the Match: Shane Perry (Redcliffe)

Burleigh Bears	Position	Redcliffe Dolphins
Trent Purdon	FB	Justin McKay
Dimitri Pelo	WG	Paul Shilvock
Adam Hutchinson	CE	Damien Richters
Reggie Cressbrook	CE	Brian Jellick
Aseri Laing	WG	Aaron Barba
Ryan Gundry	FE	Shane Perry
Brent McConnell	HB	Mick Roberts (c)
Adam Watene	PR	Shane Tronc
Ryan Dagwell	HK	Jason Campbell
Shane O'Flanagan	PR	Adam Starr
Stan Berryman	SR	Ben Jones
Tony Gray	SR	Danny Burke
Dean Allen (c)	LK	Grant Flugge
Jeremy Lateo	Bench	Matt Anderton
Matt Harriden	Bench	Troy Lindsay
Afa Gafa	Bench	Daniel Green
Faron Anderson	Bench	Andrew Wynyard
Rick Stone	Coach	Neil Wharton

Burleigh, who finished as minor premiers ahead of Redcliffe on points differential, earned a week one bye in the finals before defeating the Dolphins in the major semi final to secure a spot in their second Grand Final. Redcliffe, who defeated Ipswich in the first week of the finals, faced Wynnum in the preliminary final after their loss to Burleigh. A dominant 46–26 win over the Seagulls saw them qualify for their fifth straight Grand Final and set up a rematch of the 1999 decider against Burleigh.

=== First half ===
Burleigh started the Grand Final in the best way possible when centre Reggie Cressbrook intercepted a pass in the opening set to score under the posts. Redcliffe hit back through the competition's top try scorer Aaron Barba, who scored in the 18th minute. Barba got his second try of the game when he chased down a Shane Perry kick from a scrum win to score untouched. Barba scored his third try of the contest when he scooped up a kick from inside his own half and ran 70 metres to score just before half time.

=== Second half ===
Redcliffe seemingly put the game beyond doubt four minutes into the second half when centre Damien Richters scored out wide. Burleigh staged a small fightback with two tries in five minutes to Tony Gray and Trent Purdon but the Dolphins truly put the game to bed when Ben Jones scored with eight minutes to play. In the 78th minute, five-eighth Shane Perry wrapped up the victory with a field goal to extend the final winning margin to 13. The win gave the Dolphins' their fourth premiership in eight seasons and their first back-to-back titles.

== Player statistics ==
=== Leading try scorers ===
Pos	Player	Team	Tries
1	Aaron Barba	Redcliffe Dolphins	33
2	Ricky Bird	Ipswich Jets	19
2	Cooper Cronk	Norths Devils	19
3	Rick Dodd	Souths Logan Magpies	17
3	Derek Fletcher	Norths Devils	17
3	Denny Lambert	Wynnum Seagulls	17

=== Leading point scorers ===
Pos	Player	Team	T	G	FG	Pts
1	Steven West	Ipswich Jets	15	102	-	264
2	Damien Quinn	Wynnum Seagulls	13	70	-	192
3	Reggie Cressbrook	Burleigh Bears	11	70	-	184
4	Brenton Bowen	North Queensland Young Guns	15	49	-	158
5	Rick Dodd	Souths Logan Magpies	17	43	-	154

== End-of-season awards ==
- Courier Mail Medal: Denny Lambert ( Wynnum Seagulls)
- Rookie of the Year:matt Harriden( Souths Logan Magpies)

== See also ==
- Queensland Cup
- Queensland Rugby League
