= 2008 Queensland Cup =

- Duration: March 15 – September 13, 2008
- Teams: 11
- Premiers: Souths Logan Magpies (1st title)
- Minor premiers: Ipswich Jets (1st title)
- Matches played: 116
- Points scored: 5,635
- Top points scorer: Nick Parfitt
- Player of the year: Nat Bowman (Courier Mail Medal)
- Top try-scorer: Adam Fielder

The 2008 Queensland Cup season was the 13th season of Queensland's top-level statewide rugby league competition run by the Queensland Rugby League. The competition, known as the Queensland Wizard Cup due to sponsorship from Wizard Home Loans featured 11 teams playing a 26-week long season (including finals) from March to September.

The Souths Logan Magpies won their first premiership after defeating the Ipswich Jets 24–18 at North Ipswich Reserve. Central Comets' five-eighth Nat Bowman was named the competition's Player of the Year, winning the Courier Mail Medal.

== Teams ==
Two new teams entered the Queensland Cup in 2008, as the competition expanded north with the Mackay Cutters and the Northern Pride. Mackay hadn't hosted a team since the 1996 season, while the Pride, based in Cairns, were represented by the Cairns Cyclones from 1996 to 2000. The two new clubs replaced the Aspley Broncos and North Queensland Young Guns, who withdrew from the competition.

With the loss of Aspley and the Young Guns, the Brisbane Broncos and North Queensland Cowboys formed new feeder club partnerships. The Broncos sent players to six different clubs and the Cowboys sent players to the Cutters and Pride, while the Canberra Raiders formed a partnership with the Souths Logan Magpies. 2008 marked the first season since 1997 that the Melbourne Storm were not affiliated with the Norths Devils, instead forming the Central Coast Storm who played in the NSW Cup.

Colours	Club	Home ground(s)	Head coach(s)	Captain(s)	NRL Affiliate
	Burleigh Bears	Pizzey Park	Jim Lenihan	Shane O'Flanagan	Brisbane Broncos
	Central Comets	Browne Park	Wayne Barnett	Wayne Barnett	Brisbane Broncos
	Easts Tigers	Langlands Park	Darren Smith	Trent Young	Brisbane Broncos
	Ipswich Jets	North Ipswich Reserve	Kevin Walters	Danny Coburn	Gold Coast Titans
	Mackay Cutters	Mackay JRL Grounds	Shane Muspratt	Shane Muspratt	North Queensland Cowboys
	Northern Pride	Barlow Park	Andrew Dunemann	Chris Sheppard	North Queensland Cowboys
	Norths Devils	Bishop Park	Mark Gee	Marc Brentnall	Brisbane Broncos
	Redcliffe Dolphins	Dolphin Oval	Gary O'Brien	Troy Lindsay	Brisbane Broncos
	Souths Logan Magpies	Davies Park	Paul Bramley	Phil Dennis	Canberra Raiders
	Tweed Heads Seagulls	Ned Byrne Field	Michael Woods	Brad Davis	Gold Coast Titans
	Wynnum Manly Seagulls	Kougari Oval	Shane McNally	Darren Bain	Brisbane Broncos

== Ladder ==
2008 Queensland Cup
Pos	Team	Pld	W	D	L	B	PF	PA	PD	Pts
1	Ipswich Jets	20	16	0	4	2	656	329	+327	36
2	Souths Logan Magpies (P)	20	14	0	6	2	592	378	+214	32
3	Northern Pride	20	13	0	7	2	494	416	+78	30
4	Wynnum Manly Seagulls	20	11	2	7	2	526	514	+12	28
5	Redcliffe Dolphins	20	11	1	8	2	498	418	+80	27
6	Burleigh Bears	20	11	0	9	2	528	506	+22	26
7	Easts Tigers	20	8	1	11	2	454	462	-8	21
8	Tweed Heads Seagulls	20	7	1	12	2	507	535	-28	19
9	Mackay Cutters	20	7	1	12	2	416	488	-72	19
10	Central Comets	20	7	0	13	2	404	595	-191	18
11	Norths Devils	20	2	0	18	2	288	722	-434	8

== Regular season ==
The 2008 Queensland Cup regular season featured 22 rounds, with one team receiving a bye in each round. Each team played 20 games and received two byes.

== Final series ==
Home	Score	Away	Match Information
Home	Score	Away	Date	Venue
Qualifying / Elimination Finals
Wynnum Manly Seagulls	16 – 50	Redcliffe Dolphins	23 August 2008	BMD Kougari Oval
Souths Logan Magpies	16 – 40	Northern Pride	24 August 2008	Davies Park
Semi-finals
Ipswich Jets	34 – 16	Northern Pride	30 August 2008	Briggs Road Complex
Souths Logan Magpies	16 – 14	Redcliffe Dolphins	30 August 2008	Meakin Park
Preliminary Final
Northern Pride	12 – 16	Souths Logan Magpies	6 September 2008	Langlands Park
Grand Final
Ipswich Jets	18 – 24	Souths Logan Magpies	13 September 2008	North Ipswich Reserve

Qualifying / Elimination Finals
2	Souths Logan	16
3	Northern Pride	40
4	Wynnum Manly	16
5	Redcliffe	50

Major / Minor Semi-finals
1	Ipswich	34
Northern Pride	16
Souths Logan	16
Redcliffe	14

Preliminary Final
Northern Pride	12
Souths Logan	16

Grand Final
Ipswich	18
Souths Logan	24

== Grand Final ==
Saturday, 13 September

Ipswich Jets	18 – 24	Souths Logan Magpies
Tries: Donald Malone 1 Michael Ryan 1 Aaron Sweeney 1 Goals: Josh Lewis 3	1st: 0 - 18; 2nd: 18 - 6 Report	Tries: 1 McKanah Gibson; 1 Cy Lasscock; 1 Kyle Lodge; 1 Matt Templeman; Goals: 2 Tim Cannard; 2 Josh White

North Ipswich Reserve
Attendance: 6,000
Referee: Justin Eastwood
Player of the Match: Albert Talipeau (Souths Logan)

Ipswich Jets	Position	Souths Logan Magpies
1. Troy O'Sullivan	FB	1. Quentin Laulu-Togaga'e
2. Scott Ireland	WG	2. Matt Templeman
3. Donald Malone	CE	3. Kyle Lodge
4. Brendon Marshall	CE	4. Chad Grintell
5. Smith Samau	WG	5. Shea Moylan
6. Josh Lewis	FE	19. Brad Cross
7. Ian Lacey	HB	7. Albert Talipeau
8. Aaron Sweeney	PR	8. Daniel Joyce
9. Michael Ryan	HK	9. McKanah Gibson
10. Isaak Ah Mau	PR	10. Liam McDonald
11. Kurtis Lingwoodock	SR	11. Tim Cannard
12. Trevor Exton	SR	12. Lewis Balcomb
13. Danny Coburn (c)	LK	13. Josh White
14. Matt McPhee	Bench	6. Phil Dennis (c)
15. Scott Alo	Bench	14. Graham Levu
16. Leigh Coghill	Bench	16. Cy Lasscock
17. Jason Bulgarelli	Bench	17. Dashae Francis
Kevin Walters	Coach	Paul Bramley

Ipswich had their best regular season to date, finishing with their first minor premiership. They then defeated the Northern Pride in the major semi final to earn their second Grand Final appearance. Souths Logan, who finished second and qualified for the finals for just the second time, were upset by the Pride in Week 1 of the finals. In Week 2, they hosted and defeated Redcliffe before getting revenge on the Pride and defeating them 16–12 in the preliminary final to qualify for their first Grand Final.

=== First half ===
Souths Logan got off to a brilliant start when they forced an error off the kickoff and scored in the second minute through prop Cy Lasscock. It took them just five minutes to extend their lead when hooker McKanah Gibson dived over from dummy half in almost the exact spot of their first try. After denying two Ipswich try scoring opportunities, the Magpies crossed for their third try of the game when Matt Templeman intercepted an Ian Lacey pass and sprinted away to score. With two minutes left in the half, Souths Logan converted a penalty goal from in front to lead 18-0.

=== Second half ===
Down 18, Ipswich began their fightback with a try from hooker Michael Ryan just four minutes into the second half. In the 55th minute, the Jets cut the lead to six when centre Donald Malone pulled down a Lacey kick to score. Just a minute later, Ipswich completed the comeback when prop Aaron Sweeney scored under the posts to level the scores. A tense final 20 minutes followed, with Souths Logan being denied a try in the 65th minute and Ipswich missing a field goal from in front in the 78th minute. With 40 seconds left to play, Magpies' halfback Albert Talipeau put his centre Kyle Lodge through a gap close to the line. Lodge was cut down short by Jets' fullback Troy O'Sullivan but got up and scored after O'Sullivan couldn't complete the tackle. Referee Justin Eastwood checked with the video referee, who awarded the try. Josh White converted the try to seal the win and give Souths Logan their first Queensland Cup premiership.

== End-of-season awards ==
- Courier Mail Medal (Best and Fairest): Nat Bowman ( Central Comets)
- QANTAS Player of the Year (Coaches Award): Scott Smith ( Burleigh Bears)
- Coach of the Year: Kevin Walters ( Ipswich Jets)
- Rookie of the Year: Fred Tila ( Easts Tigers)
- Representative Player of the Year: Isaak Ah Mau ( Queensland Residents, Ipswich Jets)

== See also ==
- Queensland Cup
- Queensland Rugby League
