= 2024 Queensland Cup =

- Duration: 9 March – 22 September, 2024
- Teams: 15
- Premiers: Norths Devils (4th title)
- Minor premiers: Northern Pride (3rd title)
- Matches played: 159
- Points scored: 8,000
- Top points scorer(s): Thomas Duffy (Northern Pride) – 192 points
- Player of the year: Judah Rimbu (PNG Hunters) (Petero Civoniceva Medal)
- Top try-scorer(s): Manase Kaho (Norths Devils) – 19 tries

The 2024 Queensland Cup season was the 29th season of Queensland's top-level statewide rugby league competition run by the Queensland Rugby League. The competition, known as the Hostplus Cup due to sponsorship, features 15 teams playing a 27-week long season (including finals) from March to September.

Norths Devils won the Grand Final 34–20 against the Redcliffe Dolphins, after the Dolphins had eliminated minor premiers Northern Pride in the preliminary final.

== Teams ==
In 2024, the line-up of teams was unchanged from the 2023 season. There were a number of affiliation changes during 2023. The Burleigh Bears switched to the Broncos, while the Ipswich Jets joined the Titans.

The Townsville Blackhawks (South Sydney Rabbitohs) and Western Clydesdales (Canterbury-Bankstown Bulldogs) maintain affiliations with NSW-based NRL clubs, and usually do not receive any players to play in Queensland Cup for these teams. However, in April, a player availability issue at the Townsville Blackhawks saw South Sydney loan a player to the Blackhawks in a switch signed off by both the New South Wales Rugby League and Queensland Rugby League governing bodies.

Colours	Club	Home ground(s)	Head coach(s)	Captain(s)	NRL Affiliate
	Brisbane Tigers	Totally Workwear Stadium	Matt Church	Ryley Jacks	Melbourne Storm
	Burleigh Bears	UAA Park	Luke Burt	Sami Sauiluma	Brisbane Broncos
	Central Queensland Capras	Browne Park; Rugby Park	Lionel Harbin	Blake Moore	Dolphins
	Ipswich Jets	North Ipswich Reserve	~~Ben Cross~~; Tye Ingebrigtsen	Rhys Jacks	Gold Coast Titans
	Mackay Cutters	BB Print Stadium	~~Michael Comerford~~; Adam Cuthbertson	Sean Mullany	North Queensland Cowboys
	Northern Pride	Barlow Park	Eric Smith	Kyle Schneider	North Queensland Cowboys
	Norths Devils	Bishop Park	David Elliott	Kierran Moseley	Dolphins
	Papua New Guinea Hunters	PNG Football Stadium	Paul Aiton	Ila Alu	None
	Redcliffe Dolphins	Kayo Stadium	Ben Te'o	Max Bailey	Dolphins
	Souths Logan Magpies	Davies Park; Logan Metro Sports Complex	Karmichael Hunt	Rory Ferguson	Brisbane Broncos
	Sunshine Coast Falcons	Sunshine Coast Stadium	Brad Henderson	Patrice Siolo	Melbourne Storm
	Townsville Blackhawks	Jack Manski Oval	Terry Campese	Kyle Laybutt	South Sydney Rabbitohs
	Tweed Heads Seagulls	Piggabeen Sports Complex	David Penna	Lindon McGrady	Gold Coast Titans
	Western Clydesdales	Clive Berghofer Stadium	Jason Alchin	Emry Pere	Canterbury-Bankstown Bulldogs
	Wynnum-Manly Seagulls	BMD Kougari Oval	Mathew Head	Bryce Donovan	Brisbane Broncos

== Regular season ==
- Fixtures and results

Team	1	2	3	4	5	6	7	8	9	10	11	12	13	14	15	16	17	18	19	20	21	22	23	F1	F2	F3	GF
Brisbane Tigers	**SCF** **-6**	NTP -26	**IPS** **+24**	**WES** **+48**	X	**CQC**; **0**	TWE -38	MAC +12	NOR -46	**SLM** **+6**	X	TSV -10	**WMS** **-2**	BUR -4	X	SLM -1	**RED** **-14**	**NTP** **-8**	**TSV** **-12**	**BUR** **+1**	WES +16	PNG -22	WMS +4				
Burleigh Bears	**NOR** **-13**	**TSV** **+20**	TWE +26	CQC -6	IPS +10	**SLM** **+18**	**PNG** **+24**	**SCF** **+7**	MAC +16	X	RED -9	WMS +14	NTP -8	**BRI** **+4**	**TWE** **+42**	WES +38	X	TSV; 0	SLM -14	BRI -1	X	**IPS** **-12**	**NTP** **-10**	CQC -8			
Central Queensland Capras	WES +18	**PNG** **+20**	MAC -12	**BUR** **+6**	NOR -30	BRI; 0	**SCF** **-8**	**SLM** **-12**	RED +14	X	TSV -16	**IPS** **+10**	**TWE** **+4**	WMS; 0	MAC +12	X	NTP -28	PNG -14	**RED** **+28**	**WMS** **+36**	X	**NOR** **-18**	TWE +12	**BUR** **+8**	RED -18		
Ipswich Jets	**TSV** **-4**	WES +20	BRI -24	**RED** **-8**	**BUR** **-10**	**TWE** **-26**	X	**NTP** **-44**	WMS -32	PNG -18	**NOR** **-34**	CQC -10	X	MAC -14	X	**PNG** **-6**	SCF +2	**WES** +36	SCF -16	**MAC** **+18**	RED -40	BUR +12	SLM +8				
Mackay Cutters	X	SCF +20	**CQC** **+12**	TSV -1	WES +38	**WMS** **+4**	SLM -14	**BRI** **-12**	**BUR** **-16**	**NTP** **-46**	**PNG** **+14**	X	**RED** **-36**	**IPS** **+14**	CQC -12	NTP -8	TWE +6	**SCF** **-18**	**NOR** **-14**	IPS -18	X	**WES** **+36**	RED -18				
Northern Pride	**TWE** **+16**	**BRI** **+26**	TSV +8	SCF -22	RED -8	**NOR** **+26**	X	IPS +44	PNG -18	MAC +46	**SLM** **+18**	X	**BUR** **+8**	WES +20	**TSV** **+48**	**MAC** **+8**	**CQC** **+28**	BRI +8	**WMS** **+20**	**WES** **+46**	**SCF** **+20**	X	BUR +10	**SCF** **+38**	X	**RED** **-1**	
Norths Devils	BUR +13	RED -4	**SLM** **+24**	WMS -6	**CQC** **+30**	NTP -26	**WES** **+26**	X	**BRI** **+46**	**TSV** **+10**	IPS +34	X	X	**TWE** **+32**	SLM +28	TSV +26	**PNG** **-2**	**RED** **+4**	MAC +14	TWE -4	**WMS** **-18**	CQC +18	**SCF** **-26**	**RED** **+28**	X	**PNG** **+16**	RED +14
Papua New Guinea Hunters	**WMS** **+14**	CQC -20	**SCF** **+12**	TWE -8	X	**RED** **-19**	BUR -24	TSV +36	**NTP** **+18**	**IPS** **+18**	MAC -14	**SLM** **-12**	WES +6	SCF* -58	X	IPS +6	NOR +2	**CQC** **+14**	X	RED -32	**TWE** **+12**	**BRI** **+22**	**WES** **+34**	**WMS** **+15**	SCF +14	NOR -16	
Redcliffe Dolphins	**SLM** **+12**	**NOR** **+4**	WMS -10	IPS +8	**NTP** **+8**	PNG +19	TSV -8	WES -2	**CQC** **-14**	X	**BUR** **+9**	SCF -8	MAC +36	X	**WMS** **+30**	**TWE** **+46**	BRI +14	NOR -4	CQC -28	**PNG** **+32**	**IPS** **+40**	X	**MAC** **+18**	NOR -28	**CQC** **+18**	NTP +1	NOR -14
Souths Logan Magpies	RED -12	**TWE** **+8**	NOR -24	X	SCF -36	BUR -18	**MAC** **+14**	CQC +12	**WES** **+6**	BRI -6	NTP -18	PNG +12	X	**TSV** **-12**	**NOR** **-28**	**BRI** **+1**	**WMS** **+30**	TWE -40	**BUR** **+14**	TSV -18	X	**SCF** **+12**	**IPS** **-8**				
Sunshine Coast Falcons	BRI +6	**MAC** **-20**	PNG -12	**NTP** **+22**	**SLM** **+36**	**TSV** **+14**	CQC +8	BUR -7	X	WMS -8	**TWE** **-6**	**RED** **+8**	X	**PNG*** **+58**	**WES** **+30**	WMS +4	**IPS** **-2**	MAC +18	**IPS** **+16**	X	NTP -20	SLM -12	NOR +26	NTP -38	PNG -14		
Townsville Blackhawks	IPS +4	BUR -20	**NTP** **-8**	**MAC** **+1**	**WMS** **-10**	SCF -14	**RED** **+8**	**PNG** **-36**	TWE +1	NOR -10	**CQC** **+16**	**BRI** **+10**	X	SLM +12	NTP -48	**NOR** **-26**	WES +32	**BUR**; **0**	BRI +12	**SLM** **+18**	X	WMS -24	X				
Tweed Heads Seagulls	NTP -16	SLM -8	**BUR** **-26**	**PNG** **+8**	X	IPS +26	**BRI** **+38**	**WMS** **-24**	**TSV** **-1**	X	SCF +6	**WES** **+10**	CQC -4	NOR -32	BUR -42	RED -46	**MAC** **-6**	**SLM** **+40**	WES +14	**NOR** **+4**	PNG -12	X	**CQC** **-8**				
Western Clydesdales	**CQC** **-18**	**IPS** **-20**	X	BRI -48	**MAC** **-38**	X	NOR -26	**RED** **+2**	SLM -6	X	**WMS** **-8**	TWE -10	**PNG** **-6**	**NTP** **-20**	SCF -30	**BUR** **-38**	**TSV** **-32**	IPS -36	**TWE** **-14**	NTP -46	**BRI** **-16**	MAC -36	PNG -34				
Wynnum Manly Seagulls	PNG -14	X	**RED** **+10**	**NOR** **+6**	TSV +10	MAC -4	X	TWE +24	**IPS** **+32**	**SCF** **+8**	WES +8	**BUR** **-14**	BRI +2	**CQC**; **0**	RED -30	**SCF** **-4**	SLM -30	X	NTP -20	CQC -36	NOR +18	**TSV** **+24**	**BRI** **-4**	PNG -15			
Team	1	2	3	4	5	6	7	8	9	10	11	12	13	14	15	16	17	18	19	20	21	22	23	F1	F2	F3	GF
Key: Bold – Home game X – Bye Opponent for round listed above margin * - Match postponed and played between rounds 18–19

=== Season summary ===
- Round 8 – The Western Clydesdales claim victory for the first time in 273 days, defeating the Redcliffe Dolphins 32–30 at Clive Berghofer Stadium. The Clydesdales trailed by eight points with 10 minutes remaining, scoring twice for kicker Corey Fenning to score the winning points.
- 21 May – Following a string of losses, Ben Cross was sacked as coach of the Ipswich Jets.
- Round 17 – Under recently hired coach Tye Ingebritsen, Ipswich win just their second game for the season, defeating the Sunshine Coast Falcons.
- 20 July – Mackay Cutters part ways with coach Michael Comerford, installing Adam Cuthbertson as interim head coach for the remainder of the season.
- Round 19 – The annual country week saw matches played in Cooktown, Mount Isa, Bowen, Middlemount, South Kolan, Mount Tamborine, and Dalby.
- Round 21 – Northern Pride clinch the minor premiership following their round 21 win over the Sunshine Coast Falcons, a match in which they wore a replica jersey of the Pride squad that won the 2014 Queensland Cup.

== Ladder ==
Pos	Team	Pld	W	D	L	B	PF	PA	PD	Pts	Qualification
1	Northern Pride	20	17	0	3	3	660	308	+352	40	Finals series
2	Norths Devils	20	13	0	7	3	615	396	+219	32	Finals series
3	Redcliffe Dolphins	20	13	0	7	3	616	414	+202	32	Finals series
4	Sunshine Coast Falcons	20	12	0	8	3	546	387	+159	30	Finals series
5	Papua New Guinea Hunters	20	12	0	8	3	602	595	+7	30	Finals series
6	Central Queensland Capras	20	10	2	8	3	474	452	+22	28	Finals series
7	Burleigh Bears	20	10	1	9	3	542	404	+138	27	Finals series
8	Wynnum Manly Seagulls	20	10	1	9	3	492	508	−16	27	Finals series
9	Townsville Blackhawks	20	10	1	9	3	418	500	−82	27	
10	Souths Logan Magpies	20	9	0	11	3	473	584	−111	24	
11	Brisbane Tigers	20	8	1	11	3	454	524	−70	23	
12	Mackay Cutters	20	8	0	12	3	474	543	−69	22	
13	Tweed Heads Seagulls	20	8	0	12	3	486	569	−83	22	
14	Ipswich Jets	20	6	0	14	3	388	578	−190	18	
15	Western Clydesdales	20	1	0	19	3	320	798	−478	8	

Source: QRL RLP

=== Ladder progression ===
Numbers highlighted in green indicate that the team finished the round inside the top 8.
Numbers highlighted in blue indicates the team finished first on the ladder in that round.
Numbers highlighted in red indicates the team finished in last place on the ladder in that round.
Underlined numbers indicate that the team had a bye during that round.

Team ╲ Round	1	2	3	4	5	6	7	8	9	10	11	12	13	14	15	16	17	18	19	20	21	22	23
Northern Pride	2	4	6	6	6	8	10	12	12	14	16	18	20	22	24	26	28	30	32	34	36	38	40
Norths Devils	2	2	4	4	6	6	8	10	12	14	16	18	20	22	24	26	26	28	30	30	30	32	32
Redcliffe Dolphins	2	4	4	6	8	10	10	10	10	12	14	14	16	18	20	22	24	24	24	26	28	30	32
Sunshine Coast Falcons	2	2	2	4	6	8	10	10	12	12	12	14	16	16	18	20	20	22	26	28	28	28	30
Papua New Guinea Hunters	2	2	4	4	6	6	6	8	10	12	12	12	14	14	16	18	20	22	24	24	26	28	30
Central Queensland Capras	2	4	4	6	6	7	7	7	9	11	11	13	15	16	18	20	20	20	22	24	26	26	28
Burleigh Bears	0	2	4	4	6	8	10	12	14	16	16	18	18	18	20	22	24	25	25	25	27	27	27
Wynnum-Manly Seagulls	0	2	4	6	8	8	10	12	14	16	18	18	20	21	21	21	21	23	23	23	25	27	27
Townsville Blackhawks	2	2	2	4	4	4	6	6	8	8	10	12	14	16	16	16	18	19	21	23	25	25	27
Souths Logan Magpies	0	2	2	4	4	4	6	8	10	10	10	12	14	14	14	16	18	18	20	20	22	24	24
Brisbane Tigers	0	0	2	4	6	7	7	9	9	11	13	13	13	15	17	17	17	17	17	19	21	21	23
Mackay Cutters	2	4	6	6	8	10	10	10	10	10	12	14	14	16	16	16	18	18	18	18	20	22	22
Tweed Heads Seagulls	0	0	0	2	4	6	8	8	8	10	12	14	14	14	14	14	14	16	18	20	20	22	22
Ipswich Jets	0	2	2	2	2	2	4	4	4	4	4	4	6	6	8	8	10	12	12	14	14	16	18
Western Clydesdales	0	0	2	2	2	4	4	6	6	8	8	8	8	8	8	8	8	8	8	8	8	8	8

Source: QRL.com.au

== Finals series ==
Home	Score	Away	Match Information
Home	Score	Away	Date and Time (Local)	Venue
Qualifying and elimination finals
Northern Pride	38–0	Sunshine Coast Falcons	31 August, 2:00 pm AEST	Barlow Park
Papua New Guinea Hunters	23–8	Wynnum Manly Seagulls	31 August, 4:00 pm AEST	PNG Football Stadium
Central Queensland Capras	32–24	Burleigh Bears	31 August, 6:00 pm AEST	Rugby Park
Norths Devils	46–18	Redcliffe Dolphins	1 September, 2:00 pm AEST	Bishop Park
Semi-finals
Redcliffe Dolphins	36–18	Central Queensland Capras	7 September, 5:10 pm AEST	Kayo Stadium
Sunshine Coast Falcons	10–24	Papua New Guinea Hunters	8 September, 2:10 pm AEST	Sunshine Coast Stadium
Preliminary finals
Northern Queensland Pride	16–17*	Redcliffe Dolphins	14 September, 2:10 pm AEST	Barlow Park
Norths Devils	46–30	Papua New Guinea Hunters	15 September, 2:10 pm AEST	Bishop Park
Grand Final
Redcliffe Dolphins	20–34	Norths Devils	22 September, 5:30 pm	Kayo Stadium

=== Summary ===
- Qualifying finals: Notching up their 13th consecutive win, the Northern Pride shut out the Sunshine Coast Falcons at Barlow Park, with the minor premiers winning 38–0. Pride halfback Tom Duffy scored a try and converted all seven of his goal attempts in the win.
- Preliminary final: In golden point extra time, the Redcliffe Dolphins defeated the Northern Pride 17–16 to progress to the Grand Final. Dolphins halfback Joshua James scored a field goal in the 83rd minute to win the match after scores were level at full time.

=== Bracket ===
Qualifying and elimination finals
31 Aug. Cairns
1	Northern Pride	38
4	Sunshine Coast Falcons	0
31 Aug. Port Moresby
5	Papua New Guinea Hunters	23
8	Wynnum Manly Seagulls	8
31 Aug. Rockhampton
6	Central Queensland Capras	32
7	Burleigh Bears	24
1 Sep. Brisbane
2	Norths Devils	46
3	Redcliffe Dolphins	18

Semi-finals
7 Sep. Sunshine Coast
Sunshine Coast Falcons	10
Papua New Guinea Hunters	24
8 Sep. Redcliffe
Central Queensland Capras	18
Redcliffe Dolphins	36

Preliminary finals
14 Sep. Cairns
Northern Pride	16
Redcliffe Dolphins	17
15 Sep. Brisbane
Norths Devils	46
Papua New Guinea Hunters	30

Grand Final
22 Sep. Redcliffe
Redcliffe Dolphins	20
Norths Devils	34

== Grand Final ==
Sunday, 22 September
17:30 AEST (UTC+10:00)

Norths Devils	34 – 20	Redcliffe Dolphins
Tries: 6 Niu 11', 17'; Lipp 28'; Paskins 43'; Kaho 64'; Duffy 70'; Goals: 5 Lipp 13', 19', 29', 44', 72' (5/6)	1st: 18–10; 2nd: 16–10; Report	Tries: 4 Casey 22'; Dobson 36'; Kerr 47'; Walsh 61'; Goals: 2 Siegwalt 24', 49' (2/4)

Kayo Stadium, Redcliffe
Attendance: 7,173
Referee: Jarrod Cole
Touch judges: Nick Morel, Tori Wilkie
Duncan Hall Medal: Tesi Niu (Norths Devils)

Team details
Norths Devils		Position	Redcliffe Dolphins
Name	Number	Position	Number	Name
Jordan Lipp	1	Fullback	1	Latrell Siegwalt
Blake Paskins	2	Wing	2	William Dobson
Tesi Niu	3	Centre	3	John Fineanganofo
Jacob Gagan	4	Centre	4	Valynce Te Whare
Manase Kaho	5	Wing	5	Steven Numambo
Jack Wright	6	Five eighth	6	Thomas Casey
Jack Ahern	7	Half back	7	Joshua James
Cooper Jenkins	8	Prop forward	8	Tray Lolesio
Kierran Moseley (c)	9	Hooker	9	Brent Woolf
Tukimihia Simpkins	10	Prop forward	10	Josh Kerr
Oryn Keeley	11	Second row	11	Max Bailey (c)
Jeremiah Simbiken	12	Second row	12	Jaron Purcell
Mason Teague	13	Lock forward	13	Sheldon Pitama
Julian Christian	14	Interchange	14	James Walsh
Sam Elliott	16	Interchange	15	Nathan Watts
Campbell Duffy	18	Interchange	16	Jackson Frei
George Fai	20	Interchange	17	Harrison Graham
James Flack (not used)	15	Reserve	18	Tauaalo Vaipulu (not used)
Dave Elliott		Coach		Ben Te'o

== QRL awards ==
- Petero Civoniceva Medal (Best and Fairest): Judah Rimbu (PNG Hunters)
- Darryl Van de Velde Coach of the Year: Eric Smith (Northern Pride)
- Pedro Gallagher Award for Rookie of the Year: Latrell Siegwalt (Redcliffe Dolphins)
- Duncan Hall Medal (Grand Final player of the match): Tesi Niu (Norths Devils)

=== Team of the Year ===
Position	Nat	Winner	Club
Fullback	(Australia)	Trai Fuller	Redcliffe Dolphins
Wing	(Australia)	Manase Kaho	Norths Devils
Centre	(Australia)	Ethan Quai-Ward	Souths Logan Magpies
Five-eighth	(Australia)	Jake Clifford	Northern Pride
Halfback	(Australia)	Thomas Duffy	Northern Pride
Prop	(New Zealand)	Tukimihia Simpkins	Norths Devils
Hooker	(Australia)	Cory Paix	Wynnum Manly Seagulls
Second-row	(New Zealand)	Dane Aukafolau	Northern Pride
Lock	(Australia)	Sam Coster	Burleigh Bears

== See also ==
- Queensland Cup
- Queensland Rugby League
