= 2015 Queensland Cup =

- Duration: March 7 – September 27, 2015
- Teams: 14
- Premiers: Ipswich Jets (1st title)
- Minor premiers: Townsville Blackhawks (1st title)
- Matches played: 167
- Points scored: 8,231
- Top points scorer: Luke Capewell (208)
- Player of the year: Patrick Templeman (Courier Mail Medal)
- Top try-scorer: Marmin Barba (27)

The 2015 Queensland Cup season was the 20th season of top-level statewide rugby league competition in Queensland, Australia, It was run by the Queensland Rugby League. The competition, known as the Intrust Super Cup due to sponsorship from Intrust Super, featured 14 teams playing a 29-week long season (including finals) from March to September.

The Ipswich Jets won their first premiership after defeating the Townsville Blackhawks 32–20 in the Grand Final at Suncorp Stadium. Wynnum Manly Seagulls' five-eighth Patrick Templeman was named the competition's Player of the Year, winning the Courier Mail Medal.

== Teams ==
In 2015, the competition expanded to the 14 teams with the inclusion of the Townsville Blackhawks. Townsville had previously been represented in the competition by the North Queensland Young Guns and Townsville Stingers.

The Canberra Raiders ended their affiliation with the Souths Logan Magpies, who partnered with the Brisbane Broncos. After four seasons without an NRL affiliate, the Sunshine Coast Falcons formed a partnership with the Melbourne Storm.

Colours	Club	Home ground(s)	Head coach(s)	Captain(s)	NRL Affiliate
	Burleigh Bears	Pizzey Park	Jim Lenihan	Darren Griffiths	Gold Coast Titans
	Central Queensland Capras	Browne Park	Jason Hetherington → Lionel Harbin	Guy Williams	Brisbane Broncos
	Easts Tigers	Langlands Park	Craig Ingebrigtsen	Dane Hogan	Melbourne Storm
	Ipswich Jets	North Ipswich Reserve	Ben Walker & Shane Walker	Keiron Lander	Brisbane Broncos
	Mackay Cutters	Stadium Mackay	Kim Williams	Chris Gesch	North Queensland Cowboys
	Northern Pride	Barlow Park	Joe O'Callaghan	Brett Anderson & Jason Roos	North Queensland Cowboys
	Norths Devils	Bishop Park	Mark Gliddon	Brett Greinke	Brisbane Broncos
	Papua New Guinea Hunters	Kalabond Oval	Michael Marum	Israel Eliab	None
	Redcliffe Dolphins	Dolphin Oval	Troy Lindsay	Luke Capewell	Brisbane Broncos
	Souths Logan Magpies	Davies Park	Josh Hannay	Phil Dennis	Brisbane Broncos
	Sunshine Coast Falcons	Sunshine Coast Stadium	Glen Dreger	Tom Murphy	Melbourne Storm
	Townsville Blackhawks	Jack Manski Oval	Kristian Woolf	Dan Beasley	North Queensland Cowboys
	Tweed Heads Seagulls	Piggabeen Sports Complex	Aaron Zimmerle	James Wood	Gold Coast Titans
	Wynnum Manly Seagulls	BMD Kougari Oval	Jon Buchanan	Tim Natusch	Brisbane Broncos

== Ladder ==
2015 Queensland Cup
Pos	Team	Pld	W	D	L	B	PF	PA	PD	Pts
1	Townsville Blackhawks	23	19	1	3	2	870	507	+507	43
2	Papua New Guinea Hunters	23	18	3	2	3	718	487	+231	42
3	Ipswich Jets (P)	23	16	0	7	2	700	502	+198	36
4	Wynnum Manly Seagulls	23	16	0	7	2	623	440	+183	36
5	Easts Tigers	23	13	2	8	2	623	428	+204	32
6	Northern Pride	23	14	0	9	2	523	447	+76	32
7	Redcliffe Dolphins	23	10	1	12	2	671	574	+97	25
8	Mackay Cutters	23	10	1	12	2	547	497	+50	25
9	Tweed Heads Seagulls	23	9	1	13	2	510	585	-75	24
10	Burleigh Bears	23	10	0	13	2	401	674	-273	23
11	Sunshine Coast Falcons	23	7	1	15	2	452	599	-147	19
12	Souths Logan Magpies	23	7	1	15	2	506	664	-158	19
13	Norths Devils	23	5	2	16	2	420	727	-307	16
14	Central Queensland Capras	23	1	0	22	2	330	882	-552	6

== Final series ==
The Queensland Cup reverted to a six-team finals format in 2015.

Home	Score	Away	Match Information
Home	Score	Away	Date and Time (Local)	Venue
Elimination Finals
Ipswich Jets	54 – 26	Northern Pride	6 September 2015, 1:40 pm	North Ipswich Reserve
Wynnum Manly Seagulls	24 – 32	Easts Tigers	6 September 2015, 3:00 pm	BMD Kougari Oval
Major / Minor Semi-final
Townsville Blackhawks	26 – 12	PNG Hunters	12 September 2015, 5:00 pm	Jack Manski Oval
Ipswich Jets	44 – 18	Easts Tigers	13 September 2015, 1:35 pm	North Ipswich Reserve
Preliminary Final
PNG Hunters	12 – 28	Ipswich Jets	20 September 2015, 3:00 pm	BMD Kougari Oval
Grand Final
Townsville Blackhawks	20 – 32	Ipswich Jets	27 September 2015, 3:55 pm	Suncorp Stadium

Elimination Finals
3	Ipswich	54
6	Northern Pride	26
4	Wynnum Manly	24
5	Easts	32

Major / Minor Semi-finals
1	Townsville	26
2	PNG Hunters	12
3	Ipswich	44
5	Easts	18

Preliminary Final
2	PNG Hunters	12
3	Ipswich	28

Grand Final
1	Townsville	20
3	Ipswich	32

== Grand Final ==
Sunday, 27 September
3:55pm (AEST)

Townsville Blackhawks	20 – 32	Ipswich Jets
Tries: Jahrome Hughes 1 Tom Humble 1 Robert Lui 1 Zac Santo 1 Goals: Robert Lui 2	1st: 8 - 16; 2nd: 12 - 16; Report	Tries: 1 Carlin Anderson; 1 Marmin Barba; 1 Keiron Lander; 1 Matt Parcell; 1 Dane Phillips; 1 Nemani Valekapa; Goals: 2 Carlin Anderson; 1 Marmin Barba; 1 Keiron Lander

Suncorp Stadium
Attendance: 8,086
Referee: Clayton Sharpe
Player of the Match: Billy McConnachie (Ipswich)

Townsville Blackhawks	Position	Ipswich Jets
1. Jahrome Hughes	FB	1. Carlin Anderson
2. Zac Santo	WG	2. Marmin Barba
3. Tom Humble	CE	3. Liam Capewell
4. Mosese Pangai	CE	4. Nemani Valekapa
5. Samsen O'Neill	WG	5. Richard Pandia
6. Robert Lui	FE	6. Josh Cleeland
7. Michael Parker-Walshe	HB	7. Dane Phillips
8. Glenn Hall	PR	15. Kurtis Lingwoodock
9. Anthony Mitchell	HK	9. Matt Parcell
10. Dan Beasley (c)	PR	10. Rod Griffin
11. Rhyse Martin	SR	16. Billy McConnachie
12. Kelepi Tanginoa	SR	12. Kurt Capewell
13. Neville Costigan	LK	13. Keiron Lander (c)
15. Lorenzo Ma'afu	Bench	8. Josh Seage
16. Chris McLean	Bench	11. Sam Martin
18. Rhys Matsen	Bench	14. Landon Hayes
19. Ricky Thorby	Bench	22. Fakahoko Teutau
Kristian Woolf	Coach	Ben & Shane Walker

Townsville took out the minor premiership in their debut season, losing just three games (one of those to Ipswich). They qualified for their first Grand Final after defeating the PNG Hunters 26–12 in the major semi final. Ipswich, who finished the regular season in 3rd, defeated the Northern Pride 54–26 in the first elimination final. In the minor semi final, they defeated Easts and then upset the Hunters a week later to qualify for their third Grand Final.

=== First half ===
Townsville got off to a great start, scoring in the 2nd minute of the game through centre Tom Humble. Ipswich scored their first try in the 19th minute in spectacular fashion, when winger Marmin Barba ran 70 metres before finding his halfback Dane Phillips who scored. The Jets grabbed their second just minutes later when Townsville fullback Jahrome Hughes threw a wayward pass as he was being dragged over the sideline, that was dived on by Barba in the in-goal. Townsville hit back in the 29th minute when winger Zac Santo scored in the right corner. With a minute remaining in the half, Jets' fullback Carlin Anderson sliced through the Blackhawks defence off a scrum to give his side a 10-point lead.

=== Second half ===
It took just a minute before the Jets had their fourth try of the game, when captain Keiron Lander latched onto a Phillips grubber. Three minutes later they recorded their fifth try when centre Nemani Valekapa scored in the corner. The Blackhawks finally stemmed the flow of points in the 50th minute when Hughes crossed the try line. An Ipswich penalty goal from right in front extended their lead to 12 with 20 minutes to play. Townsville gave themselves a chance late when Robert Lui grubbered for himself to score in the 73rd minute to see his side trail by just six. A tense final seven minutes followed but Ipswich held on and sealed the win with an 80th minute try to hooker Matt Parcell.

The premiership was the first ever for the Jets, who had gone 30 seasons without success dating back to the Brisbane Rugby League competition. Ipswich second-rower Billy McConnachie was awarded the Duncan Hall Medal for the man of the match.

=== NRL State Championship ===
After winning the Grand Final, the Ipswich Jets qualified for the NRL State Championship on NRL Grand Final day. They defeated the Newcastle Knights, the New South Wales Cup premiers, 26–12.

Sunday, 4 October
3:40pm (AEDT)

Newcastle Knights

2015 NSW Cup Premiers

Tries:
G Ndaira (28')
J Feeney(42')
Goals:
G Ndaira 2/2
12–26
Report

Ipswich Jets

2015 QLD Cup Premiers

Tries:
M Parcell (1')
B McConnachie (10')
M Barba (37')
R Griffin(63')
Goals:
C Anderson 5/5

ANZ Stadium, Sydney
Referee: Matt Noyen

== Player statistics ==
The following statistics are as of the conclusion of the season (including finals).

=== Leading try scorers ===
Pos	Player	Team	Tries
1	Zac Santo	Townsville Blackhawks	31
2	Marmin Barba	Ipswich Jets	29
3	Linc Port	Northern Pride	24
4	Israel Eliab	PNG Hunters	22
5	Carlin Anderson	Ipswich Jets	19
6	Matt Parcell	Ipswich Jets	18
6	Michael Parker-Walshe	Townsville Blackhawks	18
8	Greg Eden	Wynnum Manly Seagulls	17
9	Stargroth Amean	PNG Hunters	16
9	Luke George	Northern Pride	16
9	Kyle Feldt	Townsville Blackhawks	16

=== Leading point scorers ===
Pos	Player	Team	T	G	FG	Pts
1	Carlin Anderson	Ipswich Jets	18	80	-	232
2	Luke Capewell	Redcliffe Dolphins	8	88	-	208
3	Noel Zeming	PNG Hunters	7	83	-	194
4	Kyle Feldt	Townsville Blackhawks	16	63	-	190
5	Matt Seamark	Wynnum Manly Seagulls	2	84	1	177
6	Scott Doyle	Souths Logan Magpies	8	66	-	164
7	Marmin Barba	Ipswich Jets	29	23	-	162
8	Shaun Nona	Easts Tigers	7	66	-	160
9	Liam Taylor	Mackay Cutters	5	61	1	143
10	Zac Santo	Townsville Blackhawks	31	0	-	124

== QRL Awards ==
- Courier Mail Medal (Best and Fairest): Patrick Templeman ( Wynnum Manly Seagulls)
- Coach of the Year: Michael Marum ( PNG Hunters)
- Rookie of the Year: Aaron Rockley ( Wynnum Manly Seagulls)
- Representative Player of the Year: Shaun Nona ( Queensland Residents, Easts Tigers)
- XXXX People's Choice Awards: Wartovo Puara ( PNG Hunters)

=== Team of the Year ===
Position	Nat	Winner	Club
Fullback	(New Zealand)	Jahrome Hughes	Townsville Blackhawks
Wing	(Australia)	Marmin Barba	Ipswich Jets
Centre	(Australia)	Kyle Feldt	Townsville Blackhawks
Five-eighth	(Papua New Guinea)	Israel Eliab	PNG Hunters
Halfback	(Australia)	Michael Parker-Walshe	Townsville Blackhawks
Prop	(Australia)	Daniel Beasley	Townsville Blackhawks
Hooker	(Australia)	Josh Chudleigh	Mackay Cutters
Second-row	(New Zealand)	Anthony Cherrington	Redcliffe Dolphins
Lock	(Australia)	Mitchell Frei	Wynnum Manly Seagulls

== See also ==
- Queensland Cup
- Queensland Rugby League
