= 2021 Queensland Cup =

- Teams: 14
- Premiers: Norths Devils (2nd title)
- Minor premiers: Norths Devils (2nd title)
- Matches played: 128
- Top points scorer: Todd Murphy (156)
- Player of the year: Jayden Berrell (Petero Civoniceva Medal)
- Top try-scorer(s): Jonathon Reuben; Nat McGavin; Luke Polselli; Ezra Mam (12)

The 2021 Queensland Cup season was the 26th season of Queensland's top-level statewide rugby league competition run by the Queensland Rugby League. The 2021 season saw the return of the competition, after it was cancelled after just one round in 2020, due to the COVID-19 pandemic. The Queensland Cup was to be played over 19 rounds in 2021, but due to restrictions and difficulties caused by the COVID-19 pandemic in Queensland, has been reduced to 18 rounds, with the finals delayed into October.

== Teams ==
In 2021, the line-up of teams remains unchanged for the seventh consecutive season. On 4 September 2020, the Easts Tigers announced that they would be rebranding and playing as the Brisbane Tigers from the 2021 season onward.

The 2021 season is the first in the partnership between the Redcliffe Dolphins and New Zealand Warriors. The Dolphins had been affiliated with the Brisbane Broncos since 2006. The Warriors affiliation with the Dolphins is their first in the Queensland Cup since their partnership with the Souths Magpies in the 2000 season.

Due to the COVID-19 pandemic, the PNG Hunters are based out of the Gold Coast for the 2021 season, playing their home games at Runaway Bay's Bycroft Oval.

Colours	Club	Home ground(s)	Head coach(s)	Captain(s)	NRL Affiliate
	Brisbane Tigers	Totally Workwear Stadium	Jon Buchanan	Darren Nicholls	Melbourne Storm
	Burleigh Bears	Pizzey Park	Rick Stone	Luke Page	Gold Coast Titans
	Central Queensland Capras	Browne Park	Guy Williams	Jack Madden	Brisbane Broncos
	Ipswich Jets	North Ipswich Reserve	Keiron Lander	Nathaniel Neale	Newcastle Knights
	Mackay Cutters	BB Print Stadium	Michael Crawley	Ross Bella	North Queensland Cowboys
	Northern Pride	Barlow Park	Ty Williams	Jayden Hodges, Chris Ostwald	North Queensland Cowboys
	Norths Devils	Bishop Park	Rohan Smith	Jack Ahearn	Brisbane Broncos
	Papua New Guinea Hunters	Bycroft Oval	Matt Church	Ila Alu	None
	Redcliffe Dolphins	Moreton Daily Stadium	Adam Mogg	Cameron Cullen	New Zealand Warriors
	Souths Logan Magpies	Davies Park	Steve Bretherton	Christian Hazard	Brisbane Broncos
	Sunshine Coast Falcons	Sunshine Coast Stadium	Sam Mawhinney	Dane Hogan, Todd Murphy	Melbourne Storm
	Townsville Blackhawks	Jack Manski Oval	Aaron Payne	Sam Hoare	North Queensland Cowboys
	Tweed Heads Seagulls	Piggabeen Sports Complex	Ben Woolf	Lamar Liolevave	Gold Coast Titans
	Wynnum-Manly Seagulls	BMD Kougari Oval	Adam Brideson	Sam Scarlett	Brisbane Broncos

== Ladder ==
2021 Queensland Cup
Pos	Team	Pld	W	D	L	PF	PA	PD	Pts
1	Norths Devils (P)	17	15	0	2	521	320	+201	30
2	Wynnum Manly Seagulls	17	12	0	5	513	374	+139	24
3	Burleigh Bears	17	12	0	5	457	342	+115	24
4	Tweed Heads Seagulls	17	10	2	5	458	384	+74	22
5	Redcliffe Dolphins	17	11	0	6	450	397	+53	22
6	Souths Logan Magpies	17	10	1	6	517	446	+71	21
7	Townsville Blackhawks	17	9	1	7	468	361	+107	19
8	Sunshine Coast Falcons	17	9	0	8	448	390	+58	18
9	Northern Pride	17	8	2	7	376	387	-11	18
10	Papua New Guinea Hunters	17	6	0	11	386	479	-93	12
11	Brisbane Tigers	17	4	1	12	364	456	-92	9
12	Mackay Cutters	17	4	0	13	330	556	-226	8
13	Ipswich Jets	17	3	1	13	365	561	-196	7
14	Central Queensland Capras	17	1	2	14	303	503	-200	4

== Final series ==
Home	Score	Away	Match Information
Home	Score	Away	Date and Time (Local)	Venue
Qualifying & Elimination Finals
Redcliffe Dolphins	40 - 20	Sunshine Coast Falcons	18 September 2021, 2:10pm	Moreton Daily Stadium
Wynnum Manly Seagulls	22 - 14	Burleigh Bears	19 September 2021, 1:10pm	BMD Kougari Oval
Souths Logan Magpies	30 - 24	Townsville Blackhawks	19 September 2021, 2:00pm	Marsden State High School
Norths Devils	22 - 16	Tweed Heads Seagulls	19 September 2021, 3:05pm	Bishop Park
Semi-finals
Tweed Heads Seagulls	41 - 22	Redcliffe Dolphins	25 September 2021, 2:10pm	Tugun RLFC
Burleigh Bears	26 - 6	Souths Logan Magpies	26 September 2021, 3:10pm	Pizzey Park
Preliminary Finals
Wynnum Manly Seagulls	40 - 18	Tweed Heads Seagulls	3 October 2021, 12:15pm	Suncorp Stadium
Norths Devils	34 - 16	Burleigh Bears	3 October 2021, 2:45pm	Suncorp Stadium
Grand Final
Norths Devils	16 - 10	Wynnum Manly Seagulls	10 October 2021, 3:15pm	Moreton Daily Stadium

Qualifying and elimination finals
19 Sept, Bishop Park
1	Norths Devils	22
4	Tweed Heads Seagulls	16
18 Sept, Moreton Daily Stadium
5	Redcliffe Dolphins	40
8	Sunshine Coast Falcons	20
19 Sept, Marsden State High School
6	Souths Logan Magpies	30
7	Townsville Blackhawks	24
19 Sept, BMD Kougari Oval
2	Wynnum Manly	22
3	Burleigh Bears	14

Semi-finals
25 Sept, Tugun RLFC
Tweed Heads Seagulls	41
Redcliffe Dolphins	22
26 Sept, Pizzey Park
Burleigh Bears	26
Souths Logan Magpies	6

Preliminary finals
3 Oct, Suncorp Stadium
Norths Devils	34
Burleigh Bears	16
3 Oct, Suncorp Stadium
Wynnum Manly	40
Tweed Heads Seagulls	18

Grand final
10 Oct, Moreton Daily Stadium
Norths Devils	16
Wynnum Manly	10

== Grand Final ==
Sunday, 10 October
3:15pm (AEST)

Norths Devils	16 – 10	Wynnum Manly
Tries: Leivaha Pulu (7') 1 Tyrone Roberts (31') 1 Michael Molo (73') 1 Goals: Tyrone Roberts (33') 1 Connor Broadhurst (75') 1	1st: 10 - 6; 2nd: 6 - 4 Report	Tries: 1 (37') Selwyn Cobbo; 1 (66') David Mead; Goals: 1 (39') Jack Campagnolo

Moreton Daily Stadium
Attendance: 7,264
Referee: Nick Pelgrave
Player of the Match: Michael Molo (Norths)

Norths Devils	Position	Wynnum Manly Seagulls
Jack Ahearn (c)	FB	Selwyn Cobbo
Nene Macdonald	WG	David Mead
Jacob Gagan	CE	Delouise Hoeter
Bernard Gregorius	CE	Jesse Arthars
Jonathon Reuben	WG	Richard Kennar
Connor Broadhurst	FE	Jack Campagnolo
Tyrone Roberts	HB	Sam Scarlett (c)
Michael Molo	PR	Aaron Rockley
Danny Levi	HK	Jayden Berrell
Piki Rogers	PR	Max Elliott
Moses Noovao-McGreal	SR	Zeb Taia
Leivaha Pulu	SR	TC Robati
Michael Sio	LK	Luke Bateman
Matthew Milson	Bench	Kalolo Saitaua
Jerome Veve	Bench	Matiu Love-Henry
Ben Nakubuwai	Bench	Tristan Hope
Liam Horne	Bench	Francis Kalisolaite-Tualau
Hiale Roycroft	Reserve	Edward Burns
Rohan Smith	Coach	Adam Brideson

== QRL awards ==
- Petero Civoniceva Medal (Best and Fairest): Jayden Berrell ( Wynnum Manly Seagulls)
- Coach of the Year: Rohan Smith ( Norths Devils)
- Rookie of the Year: Ezra Mam ( Souths Logan Magpies)

=== Team of the Year ===
Position	Nat	Winner	Club
Fullback	(Australia)	Trai Fuller	Redcliffe Dolphins
Wing	(Australia)	Jonathon Reuben	Norths Devils
Centre	(Australia)	Sami Sauiluma	Burleigh Bears
Five-eighth	(Italy)	Jack Campagnolo	Wynnum Manly Seagulls
Halfback	(Australia)	Jack Ahearn	Norths Devils
Prop	(New Zealand)	Nathaniel Neale	Ipswich Jets
Hooker	(Australia)	Jayden Berrell	Wynnum Manly Seagulls
Second-row	(Australia)	Josh Stuckey	Northern Pride
Lock	(Australia)	Luke Bateman	Wynnum Manly Seagulls

== See also ==
- Queensland Cup
- Queensland Rugby League
