= 2025 Queensland Cup =

- Duration: 8 March – 27 September 2025
- Teams: 15
- Premiers: Burleigh Bears (5th title)
- Minor premiers: Burleigh Bears (5th title)
- Matches played: 159
- Points scored: 7,584
- Top points scorer(s): Latrell Siegwalt (Souths Logan Magpies) — 182 points
- Player of the year: Oliver Pascoe (Ipswich Jets) (Petero Civoniceva Medal)
- Top try-scorer(s): Dudley Dotoi (Townsville Blackhawks) — 25 tries

The 2025 Queensland Cup season was the 30th season of Queensland's top-level statewide rugby league competition run by the Queensland Rugby League. The competition, known as the Hostplus Cup due to sponsorship, featured 15 teams playing a 27-week long season (including finals) from March to September.

Minor premiers Burleigh Bears won the Grand Final 22–8 against the 2024 premiers Norths Devils.

== Teams ==
In 2025, the line-up of teams was unchanged from the previous two seasons.

Colours	Club	Home ground(s)	Head coach(s)	Captain(s)	NRL Affiliate
	Brisbane Tigers	Totally Workwear Stadium	Matt Church	Ryley Jacks	Melbourne Storm
	Burleigh Bears	UAA Park	Luke Burt	Sam Coster	Brisbane Broncos
	Central Queensland Capras	Browne Park; Rugby Park	Lionel Harbin	Blake Moore & Tyler Szepanowski	Dolphins
	Ipswich Jets	North Ipswich Reserve	Tye Ingebrigtsen	Blake Lenehan	Gold Coast Titans
	Mackay Cutters	BB Print Stadium	Adam Cuthbertson	Hiale Roycroft	North Queensland Cowboys
	Northern Pride	Barlow Park	Russell Aitken	Nick Lui-Toso	North Queensland Cowboys
	Norths Devils	Bishop Park	Rohan Smith	Kierran Moseley	Dolphins
	Papua New Guinea Hunters	PNG Football Stadium	Paul Aiton	Ila Alu	None
	Redcliffe Dolphins	Kayo Stadium	Eric Smith	Kyle Schneider	Dolphins
	Souths Logan Magpies	Davies Park; Logan Metro Sports Complex	Karmichael Hunt	Rory Ferguson	Brisbane Broncos
	Sunshine Coast Falcons	Sunshine Coast Stadium	Brad Henderson	Sam Burns	Melbourne Storm
	Townsville Blackhawks	Jack Manski Oval	Terry Campese	Jack Campagnolo	South Sydney Rabbitohs
	Tweed Heads Seagulls	Piggabeen Sports Complex	David Penna	Lindon McGrady	Gold Coast Titans
	Western Clydesdales	Clive Berghofer Stadium	Ned Murphy	Emry Pere	Canterbury-Bankstown Bulldogs
	Wynnum-Manly Seagulls	BMD Kougari Oval	Mathew Head	Luke Gale	Brisbane Broncos

== Regular season ==
- Fixtures and results

Team	1	2	3	4	5	6	7	8	9	10	11	12	13	14	15	16	17	18	19	20	21	22	23	F1	F2	F3	GF
Brisbane Tigers	NTP +8*	**CQC** **+0**	**IPS** **-14**	PNG -34	**SCF** **+8**	**SLM** **+12**	**TSV** **-4**	CQC -14	**RED** **-4**	TWE +14	X	**NOR** **-16**	**NTP** **+28**	**PNG** **+20**	IPS -12	SLM +4	X	BUR -42	MAC +14	**TWE** **-5**	X	WES +20	WMS -8				
Burleigh Bears	**CQC** **-10**†	WMS -12	**TWE** **+2**	**WES** **+14**	IPS +20	CQC +8	PNG -8	**MAC** **+4**	NTP +2	X	**SLM** **+13**	WES; 0	**TSV** **-2**	**IPS** **+12**	TWE +16	NOR +4	X	**BRI** **+42**	**NTP** **+6**	**RED** **+18**	X	NOR +8	SCF +24	**WMS** **+8**	X	**RED** **+2**	NOR +14
Central Queensland Capras	BUR +10†	BRI +0	**MAC** **+20**	X	TSV -2	**BUR** **-8**	SLM -20	**BRI** **+14**	**IPS** **-20**	**NTP** **-18**	WMS -28	SCF -14	**RED** **-44**	X	MAC -20	IPS -22	**PNG** **+16**	**TWE** **+4**	WES; 0	**SCF** **-4**	**WMS** **+10**	X	NOR -20				
Ipswich Jets	**TSV** **-1***	X	BRI +14	**TWE** **+4**	**BUR** **-20**	**PNG** **+2**	WMS +16	**NTP** **-32**	CQC +20	RED +2	**WES** **+30**	MAC -8	X	BUR -12	**BRI** **+12**	**CQC** **+22**	**NOR** **-8**	PNG -6	**RED** **-10**	X	WES +20	**SCF** **-18**	SLM -18	SCF +1	WMS -22		
Mackay Cutters	**PNG** **+6**‡	TSV -7	CQC -20	X	**NTP** **+4**	WES -4	**TWE** **+4**	BUR -4	WMS -20	**NOR** **-2**	SCF -26	**IPS** **+8**	TWE +14	X	**CQC** **+20**	**SCF** **+40**	**WMS** **-16**	NOR -4	**BRI** **-14**	SLM -48	**TSV** **-4**	X	RED -18				
Northern Pride	**BRI** **-8***	**TWE** **-4**	TSV -14	NOR -18	MAC -4	**WMS** **-2**	X	IPS +32	**BUR** **-2**	MAC +18	PNG -4	**SLM** **+6**	BRI -28	WES +26	**TSV** **+14**	X	**RED** **-4**	SCF -38	BUR -6	**NOR** **-1**	X	TWE +7	**PNG** **-30**				
Norths Devils	**RED** **+20**‡	WES +36	SLM +8	**NTP** **+18**	X	SCF +10	**WES** **+22**	RED +4	**PNG** **-6**	MAC +2	**TWE** **+14**	BRI +16	X	TSV -8	**SLM** **-12**	BUR -4	IPS +8	**MAC** **+4**	**WMS** **+8**	NTP +1	X	**BUR** **-8**	**CQC** **+20**	**TSV** **+12**	X	**WMS** **+2**	BUR -12
Papua New Guinea Hunters	MAC -6‡	SCF -22	X	**BRI** **+34**	TWE +6	IPS -2	**BUR** **+8**	**WMS** **+18**	NOR +6	TSV -10	**NTP** **+4**	**RED** **-34**	**SCF** **+2**	BRI -20	X	**TSV** **+18**	CQC -16	**IPS** **+6**	X	**WES** **+36**	**SLM** **+20**	WMS -22	NTP +30	RED -20			
Redcliffe Dolphins	NOR -20‡	SLM +14	**WMS** **+20**	X	**WES** **+24**	TSV -22	**SCF** **-8**	**NOR** **-4**	BRI +4	**IPS** **-2**	X	PNG +34	CQC +44	**TWE** **+8**	WMS -8	X	NTP +4	**SLM** **-6**	IPS +10	BUR -18	SCF -32	**TSV** **+26**	**MAC** **+18**	**PNG** **+12**	TSV +6	BUR -2	
Souths Logan Magpies	**WES** **+56***	**RED** **-14**	**NOR** **-8**	**SCF** **+24**	WMS -34	BRI -12	**CQC** **+20**	X	**TSV** **-2**	WES +20	BUR -13	NTP -6	**WMS** **-13**	X	NOR +12	**BRI** **-4**	TWE -4	RED +6	TSV +18	**MAC** **+48**	PNG -20	X	**IPS** **+18**				
Sunshine Coast Falcons	X	**PNG** **+22**	WES -10	SLM -24	BRI -8	**NOR** **-10**	RED +8	TSV +6	**TWE** **-10**	X	**MAC** **+26**	**CQC** **+14**	PNG +2	**WMS** **-28**	**WES** **+32**	MAC -40	X	**NTP** **+38**	TWE +12	CQC +4	**RED** **+32**	IPS +18	**BUR** **-24**	**IPS** **-1**			
Townsville Blackhawks	IPS +1*	**MAC** **+7**	**NTP** **+14**	X	**CQC** **+2**	**RED** **+22**	BRI +4	**SCF** **-6**	SLM +2	**PNG** **+10**	X	**WMS** **+10**	BUR +2	**NOR** **+8**	NTP -14	PNG -18	**WES** **+20**	X	**SLM** **-18**	**WMS** **+22**	MAC +4	RED -26	TWE -12	NOR -12	**RED** **-6**		
Tweed Heads Seagulls	**WMS** **-10**‡	NTP +4	BUR -2	IPS -4	**PNG** **-6**	X	MAC -4	**WES** **+24**	SCF +10	**BRI** **-14**	NOR -14	X	**MAC** **-14**	RED -8	**BUR** **-16**	WES +30	**SLM** **+4**	CQC -4	**SCF** **-12**	BRI +5	X	**NTP** **-7**	**TSV** **+12**				
Western Clydesdales	SLM -56*	**NOR** **-36**	**SCF** **+10**	BUR -14	RED -24	**MAC** **+4**	NOR -22	TWE -24	X	**SLM** **-20**	IPS -30	**BUR**; **0**	X	**NTP** **-26**	SCF -32	**TWE** **-30**	TSV -20	WMS -26	**CQC**; **0**	PNG -36	**IPS** **-20**	**BRI** **-20**	X				
Wynnum Manly Seagulls	TWE +10‡	**BUR** **+12**	RED -20	X	**SLM** **+34**	NTP +2	**IPS** **-16**	PNG -18	**MAC** **+20**	X	**CQC** **+28**	**TSV** **-10**	SLM +13	SCF +28	**RED** **+8**	X	MAC -16	**WES** **+26**	NOR -8	TSV -22	CQC -10	**PNG** **+22**	**BRI** **+8**	BUR -8	**IPS** **+22**	NOR -2	
Team	1	2	3	4	5	6	7	8	9	10	11	12	13	14	15	16	17	18	19	20	21	22	23	F1	F2	F3	GF
Key: Bold – Home game X – Bye ‡ – Match postponed and played between rounds 6–7 * – Match postponed and played between rounds 8–9 † – Match postponed and played between rounds 19–20 Opponent for round listed above margin

=== Season summary ===
- Round 1 – Due to the impacts of severe tropical cyclone Alfred, the full slate of fixtures scheduled to begin on 8 March were postponed to dates later in the season. Initially, the QRL had hoped that some matches would take place.
- 11 April – Souths Logan Magpies score the highest score of the season, thrashing the Western Clydesdales 66–10 in their rescheduled round 1 match.
- Round 19 – The competition's annual country week saw matches played in Augathella, Emerald, Charters Towers, Gayndah, Yarrabah, Moranbah, and Goondiwindi.

== Ladder ==
Pos	Team	Pld	W	D	L	B	PF	PA	PD	Pts	Qualification
1	Burleigh Bears (P)	20	15	1	4	3	581	420	+161	37	Finals series
2	Norths Devils	20	15	0	5	3	523	370	+153	36	Finals series
3	Townsville Blackhawks	20	14	0	6	3	488	454	+34	34	Finals series
4	Wynnum Manly Seagulls	20	13	0	7	3	527	404	+123	32	Finals series
5	Sunshine Coast Falcons	20	12	0	8	3	480	422	+58	30	Finals series
6	Redcliffe Dolphins	20	11	0	9	3	500	414	+86	28	Finals series
7	Papua New Guinea Hunters	20	11	0	9	3	524	472	+52	28	Finals series
8	Ipswich Jets	20	10	0	10	3	464	455	+9	26	Finals series
9	Brisbane Tigers	20	9	1	10	3	487	512	−25	25	
10	Souths Logan Magpies	20	9	0	11	3	624	532	+92	24	
11	Tweed Heads Seagulls	20	7	0	13	3	504	530	−26	20	
12	Mackay Cutters	20	7	0	13	3	412	501	−89	20	
13	Central Queensland Capras	20	6	2	12	3	398	544	−146	20	
14	Northern Pride	20	6	0	14	3	417	477	−60	18	
15	Western Clydesdales	20	2	2	16	3	308	730	−422	12	

Source: QRL RLP
(P) Premiers

=== Ladder progression ===
Numbers highlighted in green indicate that the team finished the round inside the top 8.
Numbers highlighted in blue indicates the team finished first on the ladder in that round.
Numbers highlighted in red indicates the team finished in last place on the ladder in that round.
Underlined numbers indicate that the team had a bye during that round.

Team ╲ Round	1	2	3	4	5	6	7	8	9	10	11	12	13	14	15	16	17	18	19	20	21	22	23
Brisbane Tigers	0	1	1	1	3	5	5	7	7	9	11	11	13	15	15	17	19	19	21	21	23	25	25
Burleigh Bears	0	0	2	4	6	8	8	10	12	14	16	17	17	19	21	23	25	27	29	31	33	35	37
Central Queensland Capras	0	1	3	5	5	5	5	7	7	7	7	7	7	9	9	9	11	13	14	16	18	20	20
Ipswich Jets	0	2	4	6	6	8	10	10	12	14	16	16	18	18	20	22	22	22	22	24	26	26	26
Mackay Cutters	0	0	0	2	4	4	8	8	8	8	8	10	12	14	16	18	18	18	18	18	18	20	20
Northern Pride	0	0	0	0	0	0	2	4	4	6	6	8	8	10	12	14	14	14	14	14	16	18	18
Norths Devils	0	2	4	6	8	10	14	16	16	18	20	22	24	24	24	24	26	28	30	32	34	34	36
Papua New Guinea Hunters	0	0	2	4	6	6	8	10	12	12	14	14	14	14	16	18	18	20	22	24	26	26	28
Redcliffe Dolphins	0	2	4	6	8	8	8	8	10	10	12	14	16	18	18	20	22	22	24	24	24	26	28
Souths Logan Magpies	0	0	0	2	2	2	4	8	8	10	10	10	10	12	14	14	14	16	18	20	20	22	24
Sunshine Coast Falcons	2	4	4	4	4	4	6	8	8	10	12	14	16	16	18	18	20	22	24	26	28	30	30
Townsville Blackhawks	0	2	4	6	8	10	12	14	16	18	20	22	24	26	26	26	28	30	30	32	34	34	34
Tweed Heads Seagulls	0	2	2	2	2	4	4	6	8	8	8	10	10	10	10	12	14	14	14	16	18	18	20
Western Clydesdales	0	0	2	2	2	4	4	4	6	6	6	7	9	9	9	9	9	9	10	10	10	10	12
Wynnum-Manly Seagulls	0	2	2	4	6	8	10	10	12	14	16	16	18	20	22	24	26	28	28	28	28	30	32

Source: QRL.com.au

== Finals series ==
Home	Score	Away	Match Information
Home	Score	Away	Date and Time (Local)	Venue
Qualifying and elimination finals
Burleigh Bears	22 – 14	Wynnum Manly Seagulls	6 September, 2:00pm AEST	UAA Park
Norths Devils	24 – 12	Townsville Blackhawks	6 September, 4:00pm AEST	Bishop Park
Redcliffe Dolphins	32 – 12	Papua New Guinea Hunters	6 September, 6:00pm AEST	Kayo Stadium
Sunshine Coast Falcons	24 – 25 (g.p.)	Ipswich Jets	7 September, 2:10pm AEST	Sunshine Coast Stadium
Semi-finals
Townsville Blackhawks	16 – 22	Redcliffe Dolphins	13 September, 2:10pm AEST	Jack Manski Oval
Wynnum Manly Seagulls	34 – 12	Ipswich Jets	14 September, 2:10pm AEST	BMD Kougari Oval
Preliminary finals
Burleigh Bears	18 – 16	Redcliffe Dolphins	20 September, 2:10pm AEST	UAA Park
Norths Devils	18 – 16	Wynnum Manly Seagulls	21 September, 2:10pm AEST	Bishop Park
Grand Final
Burleigh Bears	22 – 8	Norths Devils	27 September, 4:05pm AEST	Kayo Stadium

=== Bracket ===
Qualifying and elimination finals
6 Sep. Burleigh
1	Burleigh Bears	22
4	Wynnum Manly Seagulls	14
7 Sep. Sunshine Coast
5	Sunshine Coast Falcons	24
8	Ipswich Jets	25
6 Sep. Redcliffe
6	Redcliffe Dolphins	32
7	Papua New Guinea Hunters	12
6 Sep. Brisbane
2	Norths Devils	24
3	Townsville Blackhawks	12

Semi-finals
14 Sep. Brisbane
Wynnum Manly Seagulls	34
Ipswich Jets	12
13 Sep. Townsville
Townsville Blackhawks	16
Redcliffe Dolphins	22

Preliminary finals
20 Sep. Burleigh
Burleigh Bears	18
Redcliffe Dolphins	16
21 Sep. Brisbane
Norths Devils	18
Wynnum Manly Seagulls	16

Grand Final
27 Sep. Redcliffe
Burleigh Bears	22
Norths Devils	8

== Grand Final ==
Saturday, 27 September
16:00 AEST (UTC+10)

Burleigh Bears	22 – 8	Norths Devils
Tries: 4 Christensen 19'; Sauiluma 25'; Leo 61'; Rogers 71'; Goals: 3 Rogers 26', 63', 73' (3/4)	1st: 10–8; 2nd: 12–0; Report; Highlights	Tries: 1 Lipp 37'; Goals: 2 O'Sullivan pen 12', 39'

Kayo Stadium, Redcliffe
Referee: Jarrod Cole
Video referee: Tyson Bough
Touch judges: Nathan Cornick, Jack Klein
Duncan Hall Medal: Josh Rogers (Burleigh)

Team details
Burleigh Bears		Position	Norths Devils
Name	Number	Position	Number	Name
Creedence Toia	1	Fullback	1	Matthew Milson
Troy Leo	2	Wing	2	Tony Tumusa
Nicholas O'Meley	3	Centre	3	Jordan Lipp
Kea Pere	4	Centre	4	Jacob Gagan
Mitch Watson	5	Wing	5	Manase Kaho
Josh Rogers	6	Five eighth	6	Jack Ahearn
Guy Hamilton	7	Half back	7	Sean O'Sullivan
Fletcher Baker	8	Prop forward	8	Peter Hola
Paul Roache	9	Hooker	9	Kierran Moseley (c)
Matthew Koellner	10	Prop forward	10	Sebastian Su'a
Adam Christensen	11	Second row	11	Jackson Shereb
Ewan Moore	12	Second row	12	Kenny Bromwich
Sam Coster (c)	13	Lock forward	13	James Flack
Cole Geyer	14	Interchange	14	Lauloto Salei
Sami Sauiluma	15	Interchange	17	Brody Tamarua
Takitau Mapapalangi	16	Interchange	19	Sam Elliott
Kurt De Luis	17	Interchange	20	Ben Nakubuwai
Lochlyn Sheldon (not used)	18	Reserve	18	Blake Paskins (not used)
Luke Burt		Coach		Rohan Smith

=== First half ===
With the breeze behind the backs, the Norths Devils opened the scoring in the 12th minute, Sean O'Sullivan converting a penalty attempt at goal from almost directly in front of the posts. Burleigh forward Adam Christensen scored the first try of the Grand Final in the 19th minute running on to a pass from halfback Guy Hamilton, with former Bears captain Sami Sauiluma extending the minor premiers lead to 10–2 a few minutes later. Sauiluma grounding the ball across the try line after gathering a kick from Hamilton.

The Bears had suffered an injury blow when fullback Creedance Toia was forced off the field, while Hamilton was also hobbled by a leg injury following his two try assists. After the Bears were denied a potential try by the referee in the 33rd minute, the Devils hit back in the 37th minute with Jordan Lipp scoring a try to head to the half time break down by just two points.

=== Second half ===
Norths almost scored in the opening minute of the second half through Manese Kaho, but the winger lost control of the ball in the corner. Burleigh's defence was able to keep out multiple Norths attempts inside their own half, absorbing the pressure being applied by the reigning premiers.

A 40–20 kick from Bears five-eighth Josh Rogers in the 56th minute gave the Bears their first real attacking chance of the second half, and a few minutes later a deft grubber kick from Cole Geyer evaded the Devils defence for Troy Leo to score a try.

With a 16–8 lead, the Bears took control of the contest and extended their advantage with less than 10 minutes remaining when Rogers grabbed a Hamilton chip kick above the defence to score adjacent to the posts. His goal taking the score out to 22–8 as the Bears shut out the Devils to claim their fifth Queensland Cup title.

== NRL State Championship ==
As premiers of the Queensland Cup, the Burleigh Bears faced NSW Cup premiers the New Zealand Warriors in the NRL State Championship.

2025 NRL State Championship

Sunday, 5 October
13:20 AEDT (UTC+11)

New Zealand Warriors	50 – 20	Burleigh Bears
Tries: 9 Tu 15', 40'; Tuaupiki 27', 61'; Hanson 52', 67'; Leaitaua 10'; Boyd 23'; Lussick 30'; Goals: 7 Boyd 11', 17', 25', 31', 54', 63', 68' (7/9)	1st: 32–6; 2nd: 18–14; Report	Tries: 4 Geyer 36'; Moore 58'; Rogers 70'; Watson 74'; Goals: 2 Rogers 37', 59' (2/4)

Accor Stadium, Sydney
Referee: Jarrod Cole
Video referee: Liam Kennedy
Touch judges: Kieren Irons, Nick Pelgrave
Player of the Match: Tanah Boyd (Warriors)

Team details
New Zealand Warriors		Position	Burleigh Bears
Name	Number	Position	Number	Name
Taine Tuaupiki	1	Fullback	1	Nicholas O'Meley
Setu Tu	2	Wing	2	Troy Leo
Ali Leiataua	3	Centre	3	Sami Sauiluma (c)
Moala Graham-Taufa	4	Centre	4	Kea Pere
Edward Kosi	5	Wing	5	Mitch Watson
Luke Hanson	6	Five eighth	6	Josh Rogers
Tanah Boyd	7	Half back	7	Guy Hamilton
Bunty Afoa	8	Prop forward	8	Fletcher Baker
Samuel Healey	9	Hooker	9	Paul Roache
Tanner Stowers-Smith	10	Prop forward	10	Matthew Koellner
Kayliss Fatialofa	11	Second row	11	Adam Christensen
Eddie Ieremia-Toeava	12	Second row	12	Ewan Moore
Kalani Going (c)	13	Lock forward	13	Sam Coster
Jett Cleary	14	Interchange	14	Cole Geyer
Jason Seu Salalilo	15	Interchange	15	Lorenzo Mulitalo
Tom Ale	16	Interchange	16	Takitau Mapapalangi
Freddy Lussick	17	Interchange	17	Lochlyn Sheldon
Geronimo Doyle (not used)	18	Reserve	18	Jordan Scott (not used)
David Tangata-Toa		Coach		Luke Burt
RLP

== QRL awards ==
- Petero Civoniceva Medal (Best and Fairest): Oliver Pascoe (Ipswich Jets)
- Darryl Van de Velde Coach of the Year: Terry Campese (Townsville Blackhawks)
- Pedro Gallagher Rookie of the Year: Zion Johnson (Sunshine Coast Falcons)
- Duncan Hall Medal (Grand Final player of the match): Josh Rogers (Burleigh Bears)

=== Team of the Year ===
Position	Nat	Winner	Club
Fullback	(Australia)	Ben Farr	Wynnum Manly Seagulls
Wing	(Papua New Guinea)	Dudley Dotoi	Townsville Blackhawks
Centre	(Australia)	Josh Smith	Brisbane Tigers
Five-eighth	(Samoa)	Anthony Milford	Souths Logan Magpies
Halfback	(Australia)	Guy Hamilton	Burleigh Bears
Prop	(Australia)	Josh Stuckey	Townsville Blackhawks
Hooker	(Australia)	Oliver Pascoe	Ipswich Jets
Second-row	(New Zealand)	Dane Aukafolau	Northern Pride
Lock	(Australia)	Sam Coster	Burleigh Bears

== Player statistics ==
=== Leading try scorers ===
Pos	Player	Team	Tries
1	Dudley Dotoi	Townsville Blackhawks	26
2	Israel Leota	Souths Logan Magpies	20
3	Sanny Wabo	PNG Hunters	18
4	Zion Johnson	Sunshine Coast Falcons	17
5	Will Partridge	Redcliffe Dolphins	15
5	Oliver Pascoe	Ipswich Jets	15
5	Manase Kaho	Norths Devils	15
5	Ben Farr	Wynnum Manly Seagulls	15

Note: Includes finals

=== Leading point scorers ===
Pos	Player	Team	T	G	FG	Pts
1	Josh Rogers	Burleigh Bears	9	84	–	204
2	Latrell Siegwalt	Souths Logan Magpies	8	75	–	182
3	Cody Hunter	Sunshine Coast Falcons	7	68	–	164
4	Jordan Lipp	Norths Devils	7	64	–	156
5	Joshua James	Redcliffe Dolphins	7	59	–	146

Note: Includes finals

== See also ==
- Queensland Cup
- Queensland Rugby League
