= Oliver Pascoe =

Australian rugby league footballer

Personal information
- Born: 30 September 1999 (age 27) Gunnedah, New South Wales, Australia
- Height: 183 cm (6 ft 0 in)
- Weight: 83 kg (13 st 1 lb)

Playing information
- Position: Hooker
Club
| Years | Team | Pld | T | G | FG | P |
|---|---|---|---|---|---|---|
| 2026– | Gold Coast Titans | 20 | 5 | 1 | 0 | 22 |
- Source: As of 17 November 2026

Oliver Pascoe (born 30 September 1999) is an Australian rugby league footballer who plays as a hooker for the Gold Coast Titans in the NRL.

== Early life ==
Pascoe was born in Gunnedah, New South Wales, where he played for his junior club Gunnedah Bulldogs.

Working as a tiler since age 16, he played in the Hostplus Cup for the Ipswich Jets, an affiliate of the Titans, before moving to the club prior to the 2026 NRL season.

He received the Petero Civoniceva Medal at the conclusion of the 2025 Queensland Cup season.

== NRL career ==
Pascoe had his NRL debut in Round 4 of the 2026 NRL season, when Gold Coast beat the St George Illawarra Dragons 22–14, where he scored a penalty goal for the team.

In their Round 20 clash with the Manly Warringah Sea Eagles, Pascoe scored a double.
