= Jonathon Reuben =

Australian rugby league player

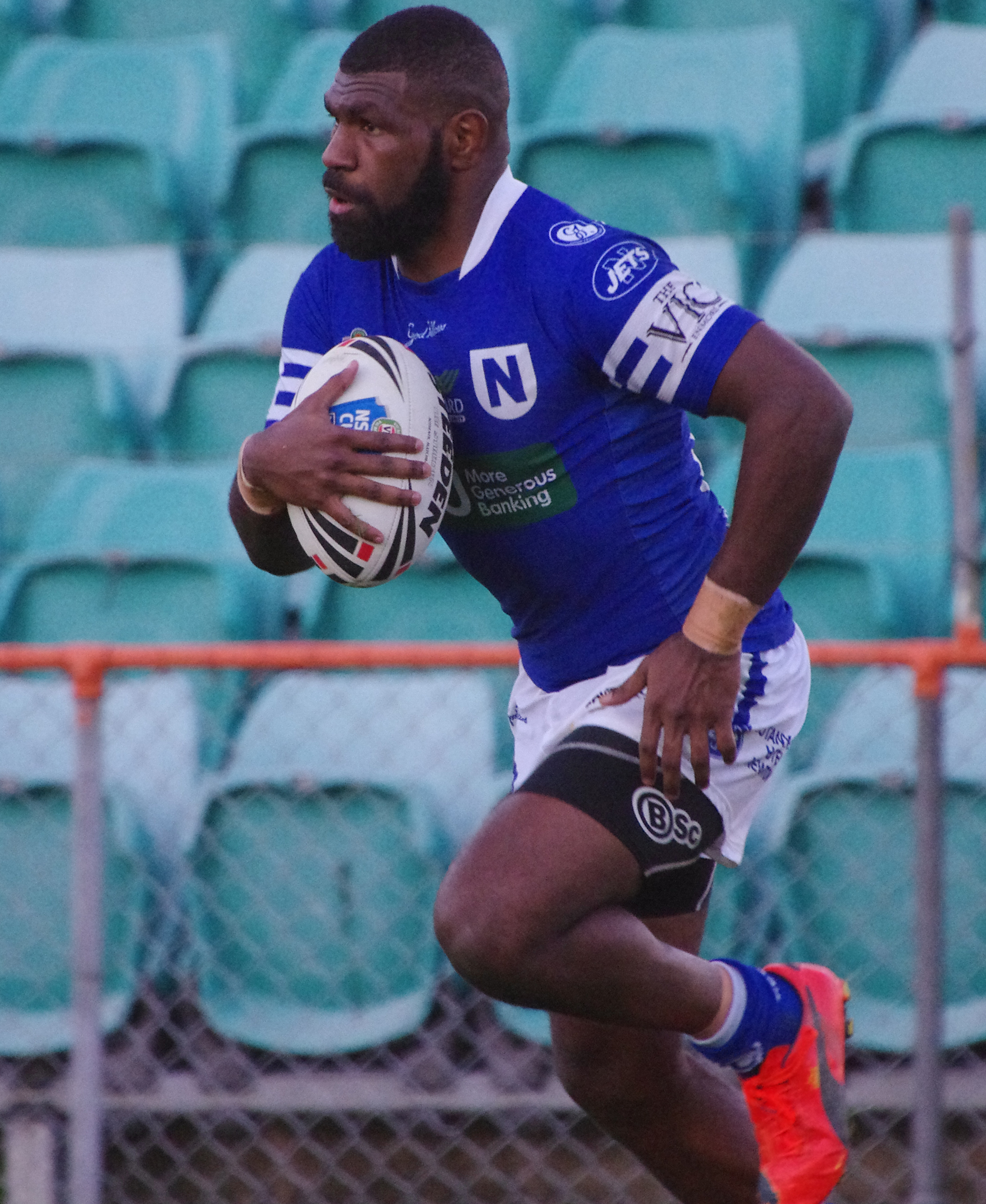

Personal information
- Full name: Jonathon Reuben
- Born: 10 March 1993 (age 33) Townsville, Queensland, Australia
- Height: 180 cm (5 ft 11 in)
- Weight: 88 kg (13 st 12 lb)

Playing information
- Position: Wing
Club
Years	Team	Pld	T	G	FG	P
2022	St. George Illawarra	1	1	0	0	4
- Source: As of 6 August 2026

Jonathon Reuben (born 10 March 1993) is an Australian professional rugby league footballer who plays as a winger, currently for the Wynnum-Manly Seagulls in the Queensland Cup.

After a storied Queensland Cup career, Reuben made his professional debut for the St. George Illawarra Dragons in the NRL at the age of 29 years and 92 days becoming the oldest debutante in the modern era.

== Background ==
Reuben was a Norths Devils junior. Outside of Rugby League, he works as an Operations Manager for Clontarf.

== Playing career ==
=== 2011 - 2021 ===
Reuben started his career as a junior in North Queensland, playing for the likes of Townsville Centrals. He spent three seasons with the Canberra Raiders developmental side scoring 44 times in 46 appearances, finishing the 2013 season as the leading try-scorer in the National Youth Competition and earning Team of the Year honours. Reuben spent an additional year with the Sydney Roosters development squad, but was unable to make the first-grade rotation. He returned home to Townsville in 2015 to join the Townsville Blackhawks in their inaugural season.

During Round 11 of 2017, Reuben scored 4 tries against the CQ Capras at Jack Manski Oval to equal the club record for most tries in a single match.

Reuben would total 70 tries in 68 appearances for the Blackhawks across 2015–2018, before stints with Sunshine Coast in 2019, and then Redcliffe in 2020. Reuben was awarded the Queensland Cup Winger of the year in 2021 in his first stint with Norths Devils as they won a premiership.

Ahead of the 2022 season, Reuben was gearing up for a return with Norths and had even secured a local job. The weekend before starting, he received a call from his manager that he had been offered a deal with the St. George Illawarra Dragons on a developmental contract for the 2022 season.

Prior to his professional Debut, Reuben had scored 107 tries in 106 appearances throughout his seven-year career through the Queensland Cup competition.

=== 2022 - Professional Debut ===
In round 14 of the 2022 NRL season, Reuben made his first grade debut in front of his family and hometown friends for the St. George Illawarra Dragons in their 31−12 loss to the North Queensland Cowboys at North Queensland Stadium, joining the squad as a late replacement for the injured Mat Feagai. Reuben totaled 14 runs for 201 meters and managed a line break in what would be his only NRL appearance.

For the remainder of the year, Reuben was assigned to the St George team in the NSW Cup where he scored 5 tries in 16 appearances on the wing.

=== 2023 - Onwards ===
After a year with St George in first-grade, Reuben returned to play with Norths Devils in the Queensland Cup. He joined captain Jack Ahearn whom he had played with 10 years earlier for the Canberra Raiders developmental side, and Coach Dave Elliott. The return marked the third time in Reubens career playing under Elliott, first at Townsville's Ignatius Park College in 2008, and again with the Townsville Blackhawks.

Reuben joined Wynnum Manly for the 2024 season in the Queensland Cup. During Round 8, he picked up 4 tries in a win against Tweed, again equaling a club record for most in a single game. He joined Ipswich in 2025.

Entering the 2026 season on 142 tries, Reuben is currently second all-time on the try scoring list for the Queensland Cup, behind Daniel Ogden's 155.

=== Statistics ===
Season	Team	Pld	T	G	FG	P
2022	St. George Illawarra Dragons	1	1	-	-	4
	Totals	1	0	0	0	0
