= Wayne Bond =

PNG international rugby league footballer

Wayne Bond (born 1986 (age 38–39)) is a professional rugby league footballer for the Redcliffe Dolphins in the Queensland Cup. He plays as a half-back or five-eighth. He is a Papua New Guinea international.

He was named in the Papua New Guinea training squad for the 2008 Rugby League World Cup but did not make the final side.
