= Nick Parfitt =

Australian rugby league player

Personal information
- Born: 23 June 1984 (age 41) Kingaroy, Queensland, Australia
- Height: 185 cm (6 ft 1 in)
- Weight: 94 kg (14 st 11 lb)

Playing information
- Position: Fullback, Wing
Representative
| Years | Team | Pld | T | G | FG | P |
|---|---|---|---|---|---|---|
| 2002–04 | Brisbane Broncos | 6 | 0 | 0 | 0 | 0 |
| 2004–08 | Queensland Residents | 3 | 2 | 10 | 0 | 28 |
- Source: As of 9 January 2024

Nick Parfitt (born 23 June 1984) is a former professional rugby league player who played for the Brisbane Broncos.
