= North Queensland Young Guns =

Australian rugby league club, based in Townsville, QLD

Club information
- Full name: North Queensland Young Guns Rugby League Football Club
- Nickname: The Young Guns,
- Colours: Primary: Navy; Grey; Yellow; Secondary: White
- Founded: 1998; 28 years ago
- Exited: 2007; 19 years ago Merged with Northern Pride RLFC

Former details
- Ground: Dairy Farmers Stadium (22,500)
- CEO: Peter Parr
- Captain: Daniel Strickland
- Competition: Queensland Cup
- 2015: 3rd
- Current season

Records
- Premierships: 1 (2005)

The North Queensland Young Guns were an Australian rugby league team competing in the Queensland Cup. They acted as a feeder team for the North Queensland Cowboys. The Cowboys had previously entered reserve grade teams in the Australian Rugby League and Super League competitions. However, to prevent a drain on travelling expenses, the Cowboys applied to join the Queensland Cup for the 1998 season. Competing as the Townsville Stingers, the reserve grade team had some initial success before narrowly missing the finals. The team was excluded from the 1999 Queensland Cup season, and the Cowboys decided to enter their teams into the predominantly New South Wales-based First Division for the 2000 and 2001 seasons. Readmitted to the Queensland Cup in 2002, the Young Guns (as they were then known) would win the competition in 2005 with a 36–6 win against defending premiers Burleigh Bears in the grand final.

The Stingers/Young Guns record in the Queensland Cup is 67 wins, 5 draws and 38 losses.

== 2007 - final Queensland Cup season ==
Their 2007 coach was Matt Parish, replacing Mick Crawley for the season. They narrowly won the Minor Premiers Trophy by beating the Dolphins by 2 points in a match in last round of the regular season at Dairy Farmers Stadium on 18 August. The regular season had a tight finish as usual: the teams below the Dolphins, the Tweed Heads Seagulls and the Ipswich Jets all finished 3 points below the Young Guns.

After such a great season, the Young Guns went into the finals as favourites. In the finals, the Young Guns were given a bye in the first round. In the 2nd round they faced the 2nd placed Dolphins but lost 28–18. They still had a 2nd chance, however, and they just needed to beat the Tweed Heads Seagulls who were in red hot form to make their 2nd Queensland Cup Grand Final appearance. They didn't, they choked at the last hurdle before the Grand Final and lost by a whopping margin of 24 points to the Seagulls, the final score was an embarrassing 34–10.

This would be the Young Guns final Queensland Cup Match as they were now officially out of the Cup due to the fact they had been merged/replaced with/by Northern Pride, based in Cairns and owned by the Cairns Taipans Australian NBL Team.

The last Young Guns squad (2007) was :

- James Andersen
- Brett Anderson
- Daniel Backo
- Ryan Bartlett
- Steven Beaumont
- Scott Bolton
- Brandon Boor
- Samuel James Bowie
- Greg Byrnes
- Sam Faust
- John Frith
- Jamie Frizzo
- Obadiah Geia
- Luke Hume
- Toshio Laiseni
- Keiron Lander
- Ben Lowe
- Ryan Mahoney
- Shane Muspratt
- Jackson Nicolau
- Brady Payne
- Dean Payne
- Scott Smith
- Ben Vaeau
- Colin Wilkie

=== Results ===
- 1998 (as Townsville Stingers) - 7th
- 2002 - 6th
- 2003 - 7th
- 2004 - 7th
- 2005 - Premiers
- 2006 - 4th
- 2007 - 1st(Minor Premiers)
