= Piggabeen Sports Complex =

Sporting venue in New South Wales, Australia

- Interactive map of Piggabeen Sports Complex
- Location: Caramar Drive, Tweed Heads West, New South Wales
- Coordinates: 28°11′32″S 153°30′1″E
- Surface: Grass
- Field shape: Rectangular

Tenant
- Tweed Heads Seagulls (2003–07, 2011–present)

Piggabeen Sports Complex, currently known as Seagulls Sports Complex, is a sporting venue situated in the suburb of Tweed Heads West in Tweed Heads, New South Wales, Australia. Predominantly used as a rugby league ground, it is the home ground of the Tweed Heads Seagulls, who play in the Queensland Cup. The ground is also used by the club's junior rugby league teams.

== History ==
In December 1985, the Tweed Heads Seagulls purchased 40 acres of land in Piggabeen to build a playing field and grandstand, which would eventually become the Piggabeen Sporting Complex. By 1986, the construction of the complex was well underway.

In 2003, the Seagulls gained entry into the Queensland Cup, becoming the first New South Wales-based team to enter the competition. The club applied for the 2002 season but were unsuccessful. They re-applied after the Logan Scorpions, an inaugural Queensland Cup club, ceased operations. Upon entry into the competition, the club were based out of and played their home games at Piggabeen Sports Complex.

From 2008 to 2010, Seagulls left Piggabeen Sports Complex, playing their home games at Cudgen's Ned Byrne Field. In 2011, after major redevelopments at the venue, Seagulls returned to the Piggabeen Sports Complex. That year, the club received an $85,000 grant and began construction on a community clubhouse. In 2013, the clubhouse was completed, with help from rugby league great Paul Harragon and the Tooheys New Crew.

On 19 September 2018, the Seagulls received a $300,000 grant from the NSW Government to upgrade the venue, which will include upgrading facilities to support female rugby league players.
