= Kougari Oval =

Sports venue in Brisbane, Queensland, Australia

Coordinates: 27°27′30″S 153°9′56″E

- Interactive map of Kougari Oval
- Location: Manly West, Queensland

Tenant
- Wynnum-Manly Seagulls

The BMD Kougari Oval is a sports venue in the suburb of Manly West in Brisbane, Queensland, Australia. Since 1967, it has been the home of the Wynnum-Manly Seagulls, a rugby league club playing in the Queensland Cup. The ground has a capacity of about 5,000 spectators, and the current naming-rights sponsor is The BMD Group, a Brisbane urban development company.

The ground is occasionally used for trial matches by the Brisbane Broncos, to which the Seagulls are affiliated, and has been used for youth internationals by the Australia national schoolboy rugby league team - one of which resulted in that team's heaviest defeat, an 8–46 loss to the Junior Kiwis in 2005.

The ground was built by the club on land purchased in 1964, and was originally known as Wondall Road ground. The current name was adopted in about 1971, and comes from the Yugambeh word for seagull.
