= Hastings Deering Colts =

Australian junior rugby competition

- Sport: Rugby league
- Instituted: 12 October 2017
- Inaugural season: 2018
- Ceased: 18 September 2023
- Chairman: Bruce Hatcher
- Number of teams: 14
- Country: Australia (14 teams)
- Premiers: Townsville Blackhawks (2023)
- Most titles: Townsville Blackhawks (2 titles)
- Website: qrl.com.au
- Related competition: Jersey Flegg Cup; Mal Meninga Cup

The Hastings Deering Colts was a junior rugby league competition based in Queensland, contested among teams made up of players aged 21 or under. The competition was administered by the Queensland Rugby League (QRL), and was contested by fourteen teams, thirteen of which are located in Queensland and one in New South Wales.

From 2018 to 2020, the Hastings Deering Colts was an under-20 competition before moving to an under-21 format for the 2021 to 2023 seasons.

== History ==
Before the advent of the Hastings Deering Colts, there had been no statewide, full season under-20 competition in Queensland. The FOGS Colts Challenge, which ran from 1986 to 2017, only featured sides from South East Queensland. From 2008 to 2017, the National Rugby League (NRL) administered their own under-20 competition, the National Youth Competition (NYC), which featured the three Queensland-based NRL clubs, the Brisbane Broncos, Gold Coast Titans and North Queensland Cowboys, and a plethora of young players from the state.

In 2016, the NRL announced that the National Youth Competition would be discontinued after the 2017 season, in favour of state-based under-20 competitions, administered by the Queensland Rugby League (QRL) and New South Wales Rugby League (NSWRL).

In 2017, in preparation for the new competition, the QRL ran a shortened, statewide under-20 competition called the FOGS U20s Cup. The competition, which was won by the Redcliffe Dolphins, ran over nine-weeks, alongside the Mal Meninga Cup, and featured all 15 teams who would eventually participate in the Hastings Deering Colts.

On 12 October 2017, the QRL announced the Hastings Deering Colts as the state's under-20 competition, running alongside the senior Queensland Cup competition, with 13 Queensland Cup sides fielding a team in the inaugural season. On 9 October 2018, the Victoria Thunderbolts left the competition after one season to return to the NSWRL setup, joining the Jersey Flegg Cup.

On 17 March 2020, two days after the completion of Round One, the QRL announced a 10-week suspension of the competition until 5 June, due to the COVID-19 pandemic. On 27 March, ten days after the suspension, the QRL confirmed the cancellation of the competition for the 2020 season.

On 19 October 2020, the QRL announced that the competition would return in 2021 and would be played under an under-21 format.

In August 2023, the QRL announced that the competition would be discontinued after the 2023 season, with players not eligible for the under-19 Mal Meninga Cup to play for Queensland Cup senior teams or A-Grade teams in district competitions.

== Naming Rights ==
In October 2019, QRL Chief Operating Officer Rohan Sawyer announced that Caterpillar equipment supplier, Hastings Deering, would continue as the naming rights sponsor of the competition from 2020 until 2022.

== Hastings Deering Colts teams ==
The Hastings Deering Colts consisted of 14 teams, 13 from Queensland, and 1 from New South Wales, and operates on a single group system, with no divisions or conferences and no relegation and promotion from other leagues.
Much like the Queensland Cup, each club in the competition has an affiliation with a team in the NRL.

=== Current teams ===
Hastings Deering Colts
Rugby League Club	Est.	Joined*	City/Town	State	Home Venue	Title/s (Last)	NRL Affiliate
Brisbane Tigers	1917	2018	Brisbane	Queensland	Langlands Park	0	Storm
Burleigh Bears	1934	2018	Gold Coast	Queensland	Pizzey Park	0	Titans
Central Capras	1996	2018	Rockhampton	Queensland	Browne Park	0	Broncos
Ipswich Jets	1982	2018	Ipswich	Queensland	North Ipswich Reserve	0	Knights
Mackay Cutters	2007	2018	Mackay	Queensland	Stadium Mackay	0	Cowboys
Northern Pride	2007	2018	Cairns	Queensland	Barlow Park	0	Cowboys
Norths Devils	1933	2018	Brisbane	Queensland	Pathion Park	1 (2018)	Broncos
Redcliffe Dolphins	1947	2018	Moreton Bay	Queensland	Dolphin Stadium	0	Dolphins
Souths Logan Magpies	1918	2018	Brisbane	Queensland	Davies Park	0	Broncos
Sunshine Coast Falcons	1996	2018	Sunshine Coast	Queensland	Sunshine Coast Stadium	1 (2019)	Storm
Townsville Blackhawks	2015	2018	Townsville	Queensland	Jack Manski Oval	2 (2023)	Cowboys
Tweed Seagulls	1909	2018	Tweed Heads	NSW	Piggabeen Sports Complex	0	Titans
Western Clydesdales	2017	2018	Toowoomba	Queensland	Gold Park	0	Titans
Wynnum Manly Seagulls	1951	2018	Brisbane	Queensland	BMD Kougari Oval	1 (2021)	Broncos

== Season structure ==
=== Regular season ===
The Hastings Deering Colts followed the same regular season format as the Queensland Cup, with games usually played as curtain-raisers to the senior fixtures. Beginning in early March, a round of regular season games is then played almost every weekend for twenty-three weeks, ending in early September. Unlike the Queensland Cup, the Hastings Deering Colts features three full rounds where every team receives a bye and a split round in Round 19. These rounds are scheduled in to accommodate university exam periods.

Teams receive two competition points for a win, and one point for a draw. The bye also receives two points; a loss, no points. Teams on the ladder are ranked by competition points, then match points differential (for and against) and points percentage are used to separate teams with equal competition points. At the end of the regular season, the club which is ranked highest on the ladder is declared minor premiers.

=== Finals series ===
After using a top six final series system in 2018, the competition followed the Queensland Cup in adopting a top eight final series for the 2019 season. The eight finalists are split into two groups for the opening week of the finals series. The top four teams have the best chance of winning the premiership and play the two Qualifying Finals. The winners get a bye through to Week Three of the finals to play home Preliminary Finals, while the losers play home Semi-Finals in Week Two. The bottom four teams play the two Elimination Finals, where the winners advance to Week Two away games and the losers' seasons are over.

The winners of two Preliminary Finals then contest the Grand Final, which is played in late September as a curtain-raiser to the Queensland Cup Grand Final.

== Grand Final results ==
Season	Grand Finals
Season	Premiers	Score	Runners-up	Venue
2018	Norths Devils	20 – 16	Townsville Blackhawks	Suncorp Stadium
2019	Sun. Coast Falcons	34 – 28	Wynnum Manly Seagulls	Dolphin Stadium
2020	Season cancelled
2021	Wynnum Manly Seagulls	17 – 16	Townsville Blackhawks	Moreton Daily Stadium
2022	Townsville Blackhawks	46 – 32	Redcliffe Dolphins	Moreton Daily Stadium
2023	Townsville Blackhawks	40 – 0	Brisbane Tigers	Kayo Stadium

== Awards ==
=== Player of the Year ===
- 2018: Shannon Gardiner (Wynnum-Manly Seagulls)
- 2019: Tom McGrath (Northern Pride)
- 2020: Not awarded
- 2021: Cruise Ten (Souths Logan Magpies)
- 2022: Jonah Glover (Brisbane Tigers)
- 2023: Lachlan West (Brisbane Tigers)

== See also ==
- Jersey Flegg Cup
- Queensland Cup
- Mal Meninga Cup
- FOGS Colts Challenge
- Queensland Rugby League
