= 2025 QRL Major Competitions =

The Queensland Rugby League will administer several Major Competitions during the 2025 season. This will include five men's competitions, and one women's competition. Along with the New South Wales Rugby League, these competitions feed into the National Rugby League.

== Major Competitions ==
=== Queensland Cup ===
The Queensland Cup (named the Hostplus Cup for sponsorship reasons) is the premier men's Rugby League competition in Queensland. Nationally, Along with the New South Wales Cup, the Queensland Cup is a Tier 2 competition and feeds into the Tier 1 National Rugby League.

==== Teams ====
Colours	Club	NRL Affiliate	Home ground(s)	Head coach
	Brisbane Tigers	Melbourne Storm	Totally Workwear Stadium	Matt Church
	Burleigh Bears	Brisbane Broncos	UAA Park	Luke Burt
	Central Queensland Capras	Dolphins	Rugby Park	Lionel Harbin
	Ipswich Jets	Gold Coast Titans	North Ipswich Reserve	Tye Ingebrigtsen
	Mackay Cutters	North Queensland Cowboys	BB Print Stadium	Adam Cuthbertson
	Northern Pride	North Queensland Cowboys	Barlow Park	Russell Aitken
	Norths Devils	Dolphins	Bishop Park	Rohan Smith
	Papua New Guinea Hunters	N/A	Santos National Football Stadium	Paul Aiton
	Redcliffe Dolphins	Dolphins	Kayo Stadium	Eric Smith
	Souths Logan Magpies	Brisbane Broncos	Davies Park, Marsden State High School	Karmichael Hunt
	Sunshine Coast Falcons	Melbourne Storm	Sunshine Coast Stadium	Brad Henderson
	Townsville Blackhawks	South Sydney Rabbitohs	Jack Manski Oval	Terry Campese
	Tweed Heads Seagulls	Gold Coast Titans	Piggabeen Sports Complex	David Penna
	Western Clydesdales	Canterbury-Bankstown Bulldogs	Toowoomba Sports Ground	Ned Murphy
	Wynnum Manly Seagulls	Brisbane Broncos	BMD Kougari Oval	Mathew Head

Queensland State Map	Brisbane Map
Home Venues	Home Venues

==== Ladder ====
Pos	Team	Pld	W	D	L	B	PF	PA	PD	Pts	Qualification
1	Burleigh Bears	20	15	1	4	3	581	420	+161	37	Minor Premiers & Qualifying Finals
2	Norths Devils	20	15	0	5	3	523	370	+153	36	Qualifying Finals
3	Townsville Blackhawks	20	14	0	6	3	488	454	+34	34	Qualifying Finals
4	Wynnum Manly Seagulls	20	13	0	7	3	527	404	+123	32	Qualifying Finals
5	Sunshine Coast Falcons	20	12	0	8	3	480	422	+58	30	Elimination Finals
6	Redcliffe Dolphins	20	11	0	9	3	500	414	+86	28	Elimination Finals
7	Papua New Guinea Hunters	20	11	0	9	3	524	472	+52	28	Elimination Finals
8	Ipswich Jets	20	10	0	10	3	464	455	+9	26	Elimination Finals
9	Brisbane Tigers	20	9	1	10	3	487	512	–25	25	
10	Souths Logan Magpies	20	9	0	11	3	624	532	+92	24	
11	Tweed Heads Seagulls	20	7	0	13	3	504	530	–26	20	
12	Mackay Cutters	20	7	0	13	3	412	501	–89	20	
13	Central Queensland Capras	20	6	2	12	3	398	544	-146	20	
14	Northern Pride	20	6	0	14	3	417	477	–60	18	
15	Western Clydesdales	20	2	2	16	3	308	730	-422	12	

Updated to match(es) played on 1 September. Source:
Rules for classification: 1) points; 2) point difference; 3) points scored

===== Ladder progression =====
- Numbers highlighted in green indicate that the team finished the round inside the top 8.
- Numbers highlighted in blue indicates the team finished first on the ladder in that round.
- Numbers highlighted in red indicates the team finished last place on the ladder in that round.
- Underlined numbers indicate that the team had a bye during that round.

Pos	Team	2	3	4	5	6	7	8	9	10	11	12	13	14	15	16	17	18	19	1	20	21	22	23
1	Burleigh Bears	0	2	4	6	8	8	10	12	14	16	17	17	19	21	23	25	27	29	29	31	33	35	37
2	Norths Devils	2	4	6	8	10	14	16	16	18	20	22	24	24	24	24	26	28	30	30	32	34	34	36
3	Townsville Blackhawks	2	4	6	8	10	12	12	16	18	20	22	24	26	26	26	28	30	30	30	32	34	34	34
4	Wynnum Manly Seagulls	2	2	4	6	8	10	10	12	14	16	16	18	20	22	24	26	28	28	28	28	28	30	32
5	Sunshine Coast Falcons	2	2	2	2	2	6	8	8	10	12	14	16	16	18	18	20	22	24	24	26	28	30	30
6	Redcliffe Dolphins	2	4	6	8	8	8	8	10	10	12	14	16	18	18	20	22	22	24	24	24	24	26	28
7	Papua New Guinea Hunters	0	2	4	6	6	8	10	12	12	14	14	14	14	16	18	18	20	22	22	24	26	26	28
8	Ipswich Jets	2	4	6	6	8	10	10	12	14	16	16	18	18	20	22	22	22	22	22	24	26	26	26
9	Brisbane Tigers	1	1	1	3	5	5	5	7	9	11	11	13	15	15	17	19	19	21	21	21	23	25	25
10	Souths Logan Magpies	0	0	2	2	2	4	6	8	10	10	10	10	12	14	14	14	16	18	18	20	20	22	24
11	Tweed Heads Seagulls	2	2	2	2	4	4	6	8	8	8	10	10	10	10	12	14	14	14	14	16	18	18	20
12	Mackay Cutters	0	0	2	4	4	8	8	8	8	8	10	12	14	16	18	18	18	18	18	18	18	20	20
13	Central Queensland Capras	1	3	5	5	5	5	7	7	7	7	7	7	9	9	9	11	13	14	16	16	18	20	20
14	Northern Pride	0	0	0	0	0	2	4	4	6	6	8	8	10	12	14	14	14	14	14	14	16	18	18
15	Western Clydesdales	0	2	2	2	4	4	4	6	6	6	7	9	9	9	9	9	9	10	10	10	10	10	12

Season Results:

Home	Score	Away	Match Information
Home	Score	Away	Date and Time	Venue	Referee	Video
Round 1
Tweed Heads Seagulls	28 – 38	Wynnum Manly Seagulls	Saturday, 19 April, 2:00pm	Piggabeen Sports Complex	Jordan Morel
Mackay Cutters	26 – 20	Papua New Guinea Hunters	Saturday, 19 April, 3:00pm	BB Print Stadium	Josh Eaton
Norths Devils	26 – 6	Redcliffe Dolphins	Saturday, 19 April, 4:00pm	Bishop Park	Belinda Sharpe
Northern Pride	10 – 18	Brisbane Tigers	Saturday, 10 May, 5:30pm	Barlow Park	Daniel Schwass
Ipswich Jets	20 – 21	Townsville Blackhawks	Sunday, 11 May, 2:00pm	North Ipswich Reserve	Ben Watts
Souths Logan Magpies	66 – 10	Western Clydesdales	Sunday, 11 May, 2:00pm	Davies Park	Taylor Worth
Burleigh Bears	24 – 34	Central Queensland Capras	Saturday, 2 August, 3:00pm	UAA Park	Jordan Morel
Sunshine Coast Falcons		BYE
Round 2
Western Clydesdales	8 – 44	Norths Devils	Saturday, 15 March, 3:30pm	Toowoomba Sports Ground	Taylor Worth
Sunshine Coast Falcons	28 – 6	Papua New Guinea Hunters	Saturday, 15 March, 5:00pm	Sunshine Coast Stadium	Ben Watts
Northern Pride	16 – 20	Tweed Heads Seagulls	Saturday, 15 March, 5:30pm	Barlow Park	Matt Gannon
Brisbane Tigers	26 – 26	Central Queensland Capras	Sunday, 16 March, 2:10pm	Totally Workwear Stadium	Nick Pelgrave
Souths Logan Magpies	22 – 36	Redcliffe Dolphins	Sunday, 16 March, 3:00pm	Davies Park	Jordan Morel
Wynnum Manly Seagulls	36 – 24	Burleigh Bears	Sunday, 16 March, 3:00pm	BMD Kougari Oval	Josh Eaton
Townsville Blackhawks	27 – 20	Mackay Cutters	Sunday, 16 March, 4:30pm	Jack Manski Oval	Tyson Brough
Ipswich Jets		BYE
Round 3 (XXXX Rivalry Round)
Redcliffe Dolphins	36 – 16	Wynnum Manly Seagulls	Saturday, 22 March, 1:45pm	Kayo Stadium	Daniel Schwass
Western Clydesdales	24 – 14	Sunshine Coast Falcons	Saturday, 22 March, 4:30pm	Toowoomba Sports Ground	Josh Eaton
Townsville Blackhawks	28 – 14	Northern Pride	Saturday, 22 March, 5:00pm	Jack Manski Oval	Taylor Worth
Souths Logan Magpies	22 – 30	Norths Devils	Saturday, 22 March, 6:00pm	Marsden State High School	Ben Watts
Central Queensland Capras	36 – 16	Mackay Cutters	Saturday, 22 March, 6:00pm	Rugby Park	Jordan Morel
Burleigh Bears	30 – 28	Tweed Heads Seagulls	Sunday, 23 March, 2:10pm	UAA Park	Chris Butler
Brisbane Tigers	20 – 34	Ipswich Jets	Sunday, 23 March, 4:00pm	Totally Workwear Stadium	Belinda Sharpe
Papua New Guinea Hunters		BYE
Round 4
Burleigh Bears	30 – 16	Western Clydesdales	Saturday, 29 March, 3:00pm	UAA Park	Ben Watts
Norths Devils	32 – 14	Northern Pride	Saturday, 29 March, 5:00pm	Bishop Park	Belinda Sharpe
Souths Logan Magpies	42 – 18	Sunshine Coast Falcons	Sunday, 30 March, 2:10pm	Davies Park	Daniel Schwass
Papua New Guinea Hunters	40 – 6	Brisbane Tigers	Sunday, 30 March, 3:00pm	Santos National Football Stadium	Jordan Morel
Ipswich Jets	28 – 24	Tweed Heads Seagulls	Sunday, 30 March, 4:00pm	North Ipswich Reserve	Jarrod Cole
Townsville Blackhawks	BYE	Central Queensland Capras
Mackay Cutters	BYE	Redcliffe Dolphins
Wynnum Manly Seagulls	BYE
Round 5
Tweed Heads Seagulls	20 – 26	Papua New Guinea Hunters	Saturday, 5 April, 2:10pm	Cbus Super Stadium	Jordan Morel
Ipswich Jets	16 – 36	Burleigh Bears	Saturday, 5 April, 3:00pm	North Ipswich Reserve	Daniel Schwass
Redcliffe Dolphins	34 – 10	Western Clydesdales	Saturday, 5 April, 4:00pm	Kayo Stadium	Ben Watts
Mackay Cutters	16 – 10	Northern Pride	Saturday, 5 April, 4:30pm	BB Print Stadium	Taylor Worth
Townsville Blackhawks	20 – 18	Central Queensland Capras	Saturday, 5 April, 5:00pm	Jack Manski Oval	Jarrod Cole
Brisbane Tigers	26 – 18	Sunshine Coast Falcons	Sunday, 6 April, 2:10pm	Totally Workwear Stadium	Chris Sutton
Wynnum Manly Seagulls	54 – 20	Souths Logan Magpies	Sunday, 6 April, 3:00pm	BMD Kougari Oval	Belinda Sharpe
Norths Devils		BYE
Round 6
Brisbane Tigers	26 – 14	Souths Logan Magpies	Saturday, 12 April, 3:00pm	Totally Workwear Stadium	Nick Pelgrave
Western Clydesdales	20 – 16	Mackay Cutters	Saturday, 12 April, 3:50pm	Toowoomba Sports Ground	Daniel Schwass
Sunshine Coast Falcons	16 – 26	Norths Devils	Saturday, 12 April, 5:00pm	Sunshine Coast Stadium	Ben Watts
Townsville Blackhawks	40 – 18	Redcliffe Dolphins	Saturday, 12 April, 5:00pm	Jack Manski Oval	Josh Eaton
Central Queensland Capras	16 – 24	Burleigh Bears	Saturday, 12 April, 6:00pm	Rugby Park	Jordan Morel
Northern Pride	26 – 28	Wynnum Manly Seagulls	Sunday, 13 April, 2:10pm	Barlow Park	Matt Gannon
Ipswich Jets	22 – 20	Papua New Guinea Hunters	Sunday, 13 April, 3:00pm	North Ipswich Reserve	Nick Pelgrave
Tweed Heads Seagulls		BYE
Round 7 (ANZAC Round)
Norths Devils	34 – 12	Western Clydesdales	Friday, 25 April, 6:00pm	Bishop Park	Matt Gannon
Brisbane Tigers	18 – 22	Townsville Blackhawks	Saturday, 26 April, 3:00pm	Totally Workwear Stadium	Ben Watts
Mackay Cutters	26 – 22	Tweed Heads Seagulls	Saturday, 26 April, 3:00pm	Queensland Country Bank Stadium	Jordan Morel
Wynnum Manly Seagulls	6 – 22	Ipswich Jets	Saturday, 26 April, 3:00pm	BMD Kougari Oval	Tyson Brough
Papua New Guinea Hunters	22 – 14	Burleigh Bears	Saturday, 26 April, 3:00pm	Santos National Football Stadium	Nick Pelgrave
Redcliffe Dolphins	20 – 28	Sunshine Coast Falcons	Saturday, 26 April, 5:00pm	Kayo Stadium	Taylor Worth
Souths Logan Magpies	32 – 12	Central Queensland Capras	Sunday, 27 April, 3:00pm	Davies Park	Jarrod Cole
Northern Pride		BYE
Round 8
Burleigh Bears	30 – 26	Mackay Cutters	Saturday, 3 May, 4:00pm	UAA Park	Jarrod Cole
Townsville Blackhawks	30 – 36	Sunshine Coast Falcons	Saturday, 3 May, 5:00pm	Jack Manski Oval	Taylor Worth
Central Queensland Capras	34 – 20	Brisbane Tigers	Saturday, 3 May, 6:00pm	Rugby Park	Tyson Brough
Tweed Heads Seagulls	36 – 12	Western Clydesdales	Sunday, 4 May, 2:00pm	Piggabeen Sports Complex	Daniel Schwass
Ipswich Jets	0 – 32	Northern Pride	Sunday, 4 May, 2:10pm	North Ipswich Reserve	Matt Gannon
Papua New Guinea Hunters	30 – 12	Wynnum Manly Seagulls	Sunday, 4 May, 2:10pm	Santos National Football Stadium	Ben Watts
Redcliffe Dolphins	10 – 14	Norths Devils	Saturday, 10 May, 5:00pm	Kayo Stadium	Jordan Morel
Souths Logan Magpies		BYE
Round 9
Wynnum Manly Seagulls	34 – 14	Mackay Cutters	Saturday, 17 May, 2:00pm	BMD Kougari Oval	Taylor Worth
Brisbane Tigers	24 – 28	Redcliffe Dolphins	Saturday, 17 May, 3:00pm	Totally Workwear Stadium	Jarrod Cole
Sunshine Coast Falcons	14 – 24	Tweed Heads Seagulls	Saturday, 17 May, 5:00pm	Sunshine Coast Stadium	Jordan Morel
Northern Pride	16 – 18	Burleigh Bears	Saturday, 17 May, 5:30pm	Barlow Park	Matt Gannon
Central Queensland Capras	20 – 40	Ipswich Jets	Saturday, 17 May, 6:00pm	Webb Park	Daniel Schwass
Souths Logan Magpies	26 – 28	Townsville Blackhawks	Sunday, 18 May, 2:00pm	Davies Park	Tyson Brough
Norths Devils	18 – 24	Papua New Guinea Hunters	Sunday, 18 May, 2:10pm	Bishop Park	Nick Pelgrave
Western Clydesdales		BYE
Round 10
Townsville Blackhawks	36 – 26	Papua New Guinea Hunters	Friday, 23 May, 6:30pm	Jack Manski Oval	Tyson Brough
Tweed Heads Seagulls	24 – 38	Brisbane Tigers	Saturday, 24 May, 3:00pm	Piggabeen Sports Complex	Ben Watts
Mackay Cutters	22 – 24	Norths Devils	Saturday, 24 May, 4:00pm	BB Print Stadium	Cody Kwik
Redcliffe Dolphins	20 – 22	Ipswich Jets	Saturday, 24 May, 5:00pm	Kayo Stadium	Nick Pelgrave
Central Queensland Capras	14 – 32	Northern Pride	Saturday, 24 May, 5:00pm	Rugby Park	Jordan Morel
Western Clydesdales	32 – 52	Souths Logan Magpies	Sunday, 25 May, 2:10pm	Toowoomba Sports Ground	Matt Gannon
Burleigh Bears	BYE	Sunshine Coast Falcons
Wynnum Manly Seagulls	BYE
Round 11
Wynnum Manly Seagulls	28 – 0	Central Queensland Capras	Saturday, 31 May, 2:00pm	Ron Stark Oval	Josh Eaton
Burleigh Bears	21 – 8	Souths Logan Magpies	Saturday, 31 May, 3:00pm	UAA Park	Cody Kwik
Norths Devils	28 – 14	Tweed Heads Seagulls	Saturday, 31 May, 3:00pm	Bishop Park	Chris Sutton
Sunshine Coast Falcons	32 – 8	Mackay Cutters	Saturday, 31 May, 5:00pm	Sunshine Coast Stadium	Ben Watts
Ipswich Jets	42 – 12	Western Clydesdales	Sunday, 1 June, 2:10pm	North Ipswich Reserve	Adam Rossiter
Papua New Guinea Hunters	20 – 16	Northern Pride	Sunday, 1 June, 3:00pm	Santos National Football Stadium	Tyson Brough
Townsville Blackhawks	BYE	Redcliffe Dolphins
Brisbane Tigers	BYE
Round 12
Western Clydesdales	32 – 32	Burleigh Bears	Saturday, 7 June, 3:00pm	Toowoomba Sports Ground	Taylor Worth
Mackay Cutters	26 – 18	Ipswich Jets	Saturday, 7 June, 3:30pm	BB Print Stadium	Josh Eaton
Sunshine Coast Falcons	24 – 10	Central Queensland Capras	Saturday, 7 June, 5:00pm	Sunshine Coast Stadium	Adam Rossiter
Northern Pride	30 – 24	Souths Logan Magpies	Saturday, 7 June, 5:30pm	Barlow Park	Matt Gannon
Wynnum Manly Seagulls	24 – 34	Townsville Blackhawks	Sunday, 8 June, 2:10pm	BMD Kougari Oval	Tyson Brough
Brisbane Tigers	26 – 42	Norths Devils	Sunday, 8 June, 3:00pm	Totally Workwear Stadium	Kasey Badger
Papua New Guinea Hunters	16 – 50	Redcliffe Dolphins	Sunday, 8 June, 3:00pm	Santos National Football Stadium	Daniel Schwass
Tweed Heads Seagulls		BYE
Round 13
Brisbane Tigers	38 – 10	Northern Pride	Saturday, 14 June, 3:00pm	Totally Workwear Stadium	Josh Eaton
Tweed Heads Seagulls	12 – 26	Mackay Cutters	Saturday, 14 June, 3:00pm	Piggabeen Sports Complex	Tyson Brough
Central Queensland Capras	12 – 56	Redcliffe Dolphins	Saturday, 14 June, 4:00pm	Rugby Park	Daniel Schwass
Burleigh Bears	26 – 28	Townsville Blackhawks	Saturday, 14 June, 5:00pm	UAA Park	Nick Pelgrave
Souths Logan Magpies	20 – 33	Wynnum Manly Seagulls	Sunday, 15 June, 2:10pm	Davies Park	Matt Gannon
Papua New Guinea Hunters	16 – 18	Sunshine Coast Falcons	Sunday, 15 June, 3:00pm	Santos National Football Stadium	Jarrod Cole
Western Clydesdales	BYE	Norths Devils
Ipswich Jets	BYE
Round 14
Western Clydesdales	14 – 40	Northern Pride	Saturday, 21 June, 2:30pm	Toowoomba Sports Ground	Josh Eaton
Burleigh Bears	30 – 18	Ipswich Jets	Saturday, 21 June, 3:00pm	UAA Park	Daniel Schwass
Redcliffe Dolphins	24 – 16	Tweed Heads Seagulls	Saturday, 21 June, 3:15pm	Kayo Stadium	Ben Watts
Sunshine Coast Falcons	18 – 46	Wynnum Manly Seagulls	Saturday, 21 June, 5:00pm	Sunshine Coast Stadium	Matt Gannon
Townsville Blackhawks	24 – 16	Norths Devils	Saturday, 21 June, 5:00pm	Jack Manski Oval	Tyson Brough
Brisbane Tigers	36 – 16	Papua New Guinea Hunters	Sunday, 22 June, 2:15pm	Totally Workwear Stadium	Ziggy Przeklasa-Adamski
Central Queensland Capras	BYE	Mackay Cutters
Souths Logan Magpies	BYE
Round 15
Tweed Heads Seagulls	30 – 46	Burleigh Bears	Saturday, 28 June, 3:00pm	Piggabeen Sports Complex	Nick Pelgrave
Mackay Cutters	32 – 12	Central Queensland Capras	Saturday, 28 June, 4:00pm	BB Print Stadium	Josh Eaton
Northern Pride	28 – 14	Townsville Blackhawks	Saturday, 28 June, 5:30pm	Barlow Park	Daniel Schwass
Ipswich Jets	28 – 16	Brisbane Tigers	Sunday, 29 June, 1:45pm	Cbus Super Stadium	Jarrod Cole
Sunshine Coast Falcons	48 – 16	Western Clydesdales	Sunday, 29 June, 2:10pm	Sunshine Coast Stadium	Cody Kwik
Wynnum Manly Seagulls	18 – 10	Redcliffe Dolphins	Sunday, 29 June, 2:10pm	BMD Kougari Oval	Belinda Sharpe
Norths Devils	12 – 24	Souths Logan Magpies	Sunday, 29 June, 2:30pm	Bishop Park	Ben Watts
Papua New Guinea Hunters		BYE
Round 16
Burleigh Bears	22 – 18	Norths Devils	Saturday, 5 July, 3:00pm	UAA Park	Jarrod Cole
Mackay Cutters	54 – 14	Sunshine Coast Falcons	Saturday, 5 July, 4:00pm	BB Print Stadium	Ben Watts
Souths Logan Magpies	30 – 34	Brisbane Tigers	Sunday, 5 July, 2:00pm	Davies Park	Kasey Badger
Ipswich Jets	34 – 12	Central Queensland Capras	Sunday, 5 July, 2:10pm	North Ipswich Reserve	Taylor Worth
Papua New Guinea Hunters	34 – 16	Townsville Blackhawks	Sunday, 5 July, 3:00pm	Santos National Football Stadium	Nick Pelgrave
Western Clydesdales	12 – 42	Tweed Heads Seagulls	Sunday, 5 July, 3:35pm	Toowoomba Sports Ground	Matt Gannon
Redcliffe Dolphins	BYE	Northern Pride
Wynnum Manly Seagulls	BYE
Round 17 (Indigenous Round)
Central Queensland Capras	46 – 30	Papua New Guinea Hunters	Saturday, 12 July, 2:00pm	Rugby Park	Daniel Schwass
Townsville Blackhawks	24 – 4	Western Clydesdales	Saturday, 12 July, 3:00pm	Jack Manski Oval	Taylor Worth
Mackay Cutters	14 – 30	Wynnum Manly Seagulls	Saturday, 12 July, 4:00pm	BB Print Stadium	Tyson Brough
Northern Pride	16 – 20	Redcliffe Dolphins	Saturday, 12 July, 5:30pm	Barlow Park	Cody Kwik
Ipswich Jets	22 – 30	Norths Devils	Sunday, 13 July, 2:10pm	North Ipswich Reserve	Ben Watts
Tweed Heads Seagulls	36 – 32	Souths Logan Magpies	Sunday, 13 July, 3:00pm	Piggabeen Sports Complex	Jordan Morel
Burleigh Bears	BYE	Sunshine Coast Falcons
Brisbane Tigers	BYE
Round 18
Burleigh Bears	48 – 6	Brisbane Tigers	Saturday, 19 July, 3:00pm	UAA Park	Jarrod Cole
Central Queensland Capras	28 – 24	Tweed Heads Seagulls	Saturday, 19 July, 4:00pm	Rugby Park	Cody Kwik
Norths Devils	24 – 20	Mackay Cutters	Saturday, 19 July, 5:00pm	Bishop Park	Jordan Morel
Redcliffe Dolphins	24 – 30	Souths Logan Magpies	Saturday, 19 July, 5:00pm	Kayo Stadium	Josh Eaton
Sunshine Coast Falcons	42 – 4	Northern Pride	Saturday, 19 July, 5:00pm	Sunshine Coast Stadium	Ben Watts
Wynnum Manly Seagulls	36 – 10	Western Clydesdales	Sunday, 20 July, 2:10pm	BMD Kougari Oval	Matt Gannon
Papua New Guinea Hunters	28 – 22	Ipswich Jets	Sunday, 20 July, 3:00pm	Santos National Football Stadium	Daniel Schwass
Townsville Blackhawks		BYE
Round 19 (Country Week)
Norths Devils	16 – 8	Wynnum Manly Seagulls	Saturday, 26 July, 3:00pm	Brassington Park	Ben Watts
Western Clydesdales	20 – 20	Central Queensland Capras	Saturday, 26 July, 3:30pm	Alan McIndoe Park	Jordan Morel
Townsville Blackhawks	20 – 38	Souths Logan Magpies	Saturday, 26 July, 4:30pm	Bill Lewis Oval	Josh Eaton
Burleigh Bears	28 – 22	Northern Pride	Saturday, 26 July, 5:00pm	Jilara Oval	Tyson Brough
Tweed Heads Seagulls	12 – 24	Sunshine Coast Falcons	Saturday, 26 July, 5:00pm	Gayndah Sports Ground	Daniel Schwass
Mackay Cutters	12 – 26	Brisbane Tigers	Saturday, 26 July, 7:30pm	Darryl Bourke Oval	Jarrod Cole
Ipswich Jets	16 – 26	Redcliffe Dolphins	Sunday, 27 July, 2:10pm	Gilbert Oval	Nick Pelgrave
Papua New Guinea Hunters		BYE
Round 20 (Women in League Round)
Burleigh Bears	30 – 12	Redcliffe Dolphins	Saturday, 9 August, 3:00pm	UAA Park	Ben Watts
Central Queensland Capras	8 – 12	Sunshine Coast Falcons	Saturday, 9 August, 4:00pm	Rugby Park	Lachlan Sutton
Townsville Blackhawks	34 – 12	Wynnum Manly Seagulls	Saturday, 9 August, 5:00pm	Jack Manski Oval	Jordan Morel
Northern Pride	30 – 31	Norths Devils	Saturday, 9 August, 5:30pm	Barlow Park	Matt Gannon
Brisbane Tigers	29 – 34	Tweed Heads Seagulls	Sunday, 10 August, 2:10pm	Totally Workwear Stadium	Jarrod Cole
Souths Logan Magpies	56 – 8	Mackay Cutters	Sunday, 10 August, 3:00pm	Davies Park	Tyson Brough
Papua New Guinea Hunters	48 – 12	Western Clydesdales	Sunday, 10 August, 3:00pm	Santos National Football Stadium	Adam Rossiter
Ipswich Jets		BYE
Round 21 (Licensed Clubs Round)
Western Clydesdales	12 – 32	Ipswich Jets	Saturday, 16 August, 2:00pm	Centenary Oval	Matt Gannon
Central Queensland Capras	24 – 14	Wynnum Manly Seagulls	Saturday, 16 August, 4:00pm	Rugby Park	Lachlan Sutton
Mackay Cutters	14 – 18	Townsville Blackhawks	Saturday, 16 August, 4:00pm	BB Print Stadium	Jordan Morel
Sunshine Coast Falcons	32 – 0	Redcliffe Dolphins	Saturday, 16 August, 5:10pm	Sunshine Coast Stadium	Daniel Schwass
Papua New Guinea Hunters	52 – 32	Souths Logan Magpies	Sunday, 17 August, 3:00pm	Santos National Football Stadium	Ben Watts
Burleigh Bears	BYE	Norths Devils
Northern Pride	BYE	Tweed Heads Seagulls
Brisbane Tigers	BYE
Round 22
Western Clydesdales	20 – 40	Brisbane Tigers	Saturday, 23 August, 2:30pm	Toowoomba Sports Ground	Taylor Worth
Wynnum Manly Seagulls	32 – 10	Papua New Guinea Hunters	Saturday, 23 August, 3:00pm	BMD Kougari Oval	Daniel Schwass
Norths Devils	22 – 30	Burleigh Bears	Saturday, 23 August, 3:00pm	Bishop Park	Nick Pelgrave
Ipswich Jets	12 – 30	Sunshine Coast Falcons	Saturday, 23 August, 3:40pm	North Ipswich Reserve	Ben Watts
Tweed Heads Seagulls	32 – 39	Northern Pride	Sunday, 24 August, 1:00pm	Piggabeen Sports Complex	Tyson Brough
Redcliffe Dolphins	36 – 10	Townsville Blackhawks	Sunday, 24 August, 2:10pm	Kayo Stadium	Jordan Morel
Central Queensland Capras	BYE	Mackay Cutters
Souths Logan Magpies	BYE
Round 23
Norths Devils	36 – 16	Central Queensland Capras	Saturday, 30 August, 5:00pm	Bishop Park	Taylor Worth
Redcliffe Dolphins	34 – 16	Mackay Cutters	Saturday, 30 August, 5:00pm	Kayo Stadium	Jordan Morel
Northern Pride	10 – 40	Papua New Guinea Hunters	Saturday, 30 August, 5:30pm	Barlow Park	Daniel Schwass
Tweed Heads Seagulls	26 – 14	Townsville Blackhawks	Saturday, 30 August, 6:00pm	Tully Showgrounds	Matt Gannon
Souths Logan Magpies	34 – 16	Ipswich Jets	Sunday, 31 August, 2:00pm	Davies Park	Tyson Brough
Sunshine Coast Falcons	14 – 38	Burleigh Bears	Sunday, 31 August, 2:10pm	Sunshine Coast Stadium	Josh Eaton
Wynnum Manly Seagulls	22 – 14	Brisbane Tigers	Sunday, 31 August, 3:00pm	BMD Kougari Oval	Ben Watts
Western Clydesdales		BYE
Finals Series
Qualifying & Elimination Finals
Burleigh Bears	22 – 14	Wynnum Manly Seagulls	Saturday, 6 September, 2:00pm	UAA Park	Jarrod Cole
Norths Devils	24 – 12	Townsville Blackhawks	Saturday, 6 September, 4:00pm	Bishop Park	Daniel Schwass
Redcliffe Dolphins	32 – 12	Papua New Guinea Hunters	Saturday, 6 September, 6:00pm	Kayo Stadium	Ben Watts
Sunshine Coast Falcons	24 – 25	Ipswich Jets	Sunday, 7 September, 2:10pm	Sunshine Coast Stadium	Tyson Brough
Semi-Finals
Townsville Blackhawks	16 – 22	Redcliffe Dolphins	Saturday, 13 September, 2:10pm	Jack Manski Oval	Ben Watts
Wynnum Manly Seagulls	34 – 12	Ipswich Jets	Sunday, 14 September, 2:10pm	BMD Kougari Oval	Nick Pelgrave
Preliminary Finals
Burleigh Bears	18 – 16	Redcliffe Dolphins	Saturday, 20 September, 2:10pm	UAA Park	Nick Pelgrave
Norths Devils	18 – 16	Wynnum Manly Seagulls	Sunday, 21 September, 2:10pm	Bishop Park	Jarrod Cole
Grand Final
Burleigh Bears	V	Norths Devils	Saturday, 27 September, 4:05pm	Kayo Stadium	TBA

==== Grand Final ====
Qualifying & Elimination Finals
1	Burleigh	22
4	Wynnum Manly	14
5	Sunshine Coast	24
8	Ipswich	25
6	Redcliffe	32
7	Papua New Guinea	12
2	Norths	24
3	Townsville	12

Semi-Finals
4	Wynnum Manly	34
8	Ipswich	12
3	Townsville	16
6	Redcliffe	22

Preliminary Finals
1	Burleigh	18
6	Redcliffe	16
2	Norths	18
4	Wynnum Manly	16

Grand Final
1	Burleigh
2	Norths

2025 Queensland Cup Grand Final

Saturday, 27 September 2025
4:05pm

Burleigh Bears	v	Norths Devils

Kayo Stadium, Brisbane

=== Queensland Women's Premiership ===
The Queensland Women's Premiership (named the BMD Premiership for sponsorship reasons) is the premier women's Rugby League competition in Queensland. Nationally, Along with the NSWRL Women's Premiership, the Queensland Women's Premiership is a Tier 2 competition and feeds into the Tier 1 National Rugby League Women's Premiership.

In 2025 the season will more closely align with the NRLW season. Previously, the QRLWP season has started in February.

==== Teams ====
Both Ipswich and Northern will join the competition bringing the team number to 12.

Colours	Club	NRLW Affiliate	Home ground(s)	Head coach
	Brisbane Tigers (W)	TBA	Totally Workwear Stadium	TBA
	Burleigh Bears (W)	Brisbane Broncos	UAA Park	TBA
	Central Queensland Capras (W)	TBA	Rugby Park	TBA
	Ipswich Jets (W)	Gold Coast Titans	North Ipswich Reserve	TBA
	Mackay Cutters (W)	North Queensland Cowboys	BB Print Stadium	TBA
	Northern Pride (W)	North Queensland Cowboys	Barlow Park	TBA
	Norths Devils (W)	TBA	Bishop Park	TBA
	Souths Logan Magpies (W)	Brisbane Broncos	Davies Park	TBA
	Sunshine Coast Falcons (W)	TBA	Sunshine Coast Stadium	TBA
	Tweed Heads Seagulls (W)	Gold Coast Titans	Piggabeen Sports Complex	TBA
	Western Clydesdales (W)	TBA	Toowoomba Sports Ground	TBA
	Wynnum Manly Seagulls (W)	Brisbane Broncos	BMD Kougari Oval	TBA

Queensland State Map	Brisbane Map
Home Venues	Home Venues

==== Ladder ====
Pos	Team	Pld	W	D	L	B	PF	PA	PD	Pts	Qualification
1	Brisbane Tigers (W)	11	11	0	0	0	328	144	+184	22	Minor Premiers & Semi-Finals
2	Souths Logan Magpies (W)	11	9	0	2	0	302	164	+138	18	Semi-Finals
3	Burleigh Bears (W)	11	6	1	4	0	270	184	+86	13	Elimination Finals
4	Ipswich Jets (W)	11	6	1	4	0	242	246	–4	13	Elimination Finals
5	Northern Pride (W)	11	6	0	5	0	262	230	+32	12	Elimination Finals
6	Norths Devils (W)	11	5	1	5	0	236	194	+42	11	Elimination Finals
7	Sunshine Coast Falcons (W)	11	5	1	5	0	248	232	+16	11	
8	Western Clydesdales (W)	11	5	0	6	0	214	228	–14	10	
9	Wynnum Manly Seagulls (W)	11	4	0	7	0	184	244	–60	8	
10	Mackay Cutters (W)	11	3	0	8	0	204	248	–44	7	
11	Tweed Heads Seagulls (W)	11	2	2	7	0	176	288	-112	6	
12	Central Queensland Capras (W)	11	0	1	10	0	96	360	-264	1	

Updated to match(es) played on 1 September. Source:
Rules for classification: 1) points; 2) point difference; 3) points scored

===== Ladder progression =====
- Numbers highlighted in green indicate that the team finished the round inside the top 6.
- Numbers highlighted in blue indicates the team finished first on the ladder in that round.
- Numbers highlighted in red indicates the team finished last place on the ladder in that round.
- Underlined numbers indicate that the team had a bye during that round.

Pos	Team	1	2	3	4	5	6	7	8	9	10	11
1	Brisbane Tigers (W)	2	4	6	8	10	12	14	16	18	20	22
2	Souths Logan Magpies (W)	2	4	6	6	8	10	12	14	16	16	18
3	Burleigh Bears (W)	2	2	4	6	8	8	8	10	12	13	13
4	Ipswich Jets (W)	2	4	4	4	4	6	8	8	10	12	13
5	Northern Pride (W)	0	0	2	4	4	6	8	8	10	12	12
6	Norths Devils (W)	2	4	4	4	6	8	8	8	8	9	11
7	Sunshine Coast Falcons (W)	0	2	4	6	6	6	8	8	8	9	11
8	Western Clydesdales (W)	0	2	2	4	6	6	6	8	8	10	10
9	Wynnum Manly Seagulls (W)	0	0	0	2	2	2	4	4	6	6	8
10	Mackay Cutters (W)	0	0	2	2	4	4	4	6	6	6	7
11	Tweed Heads Seagulls (W)	2	2	2	2	2	3	3	5	5	6	6
12	Central Queensland Capras (W)	0	0	0	0	0	1	1	1	1	1	1

Season Results:

Home	Score	Away	Match Information
Home	Score	Away	Date and Time	Venue	Referee	Video
Round 1
Brisbane Tigers (W)	26 – 16	Northern Pride (W)	Saturday, 14 June, 12:40pm	Totally Workwear Stadium	Fletcher Shearman
Tweed Heads Seagulls (W)	20 – 14	Mackay Cutters (W)	Saturday, 14 June, 1:00pm	Piggabeen Sports Complex	Jacob Gregg
Central Queensland Capras (W)	8 – 38	Ipswich Jets (W)	Saturday, 14 June, 2:00pm	Rugby Park	Trey Hubert
Burleigh Bears (W)	32 – 18	Western Clydesdales (W)	Saturday, 14 June, 3:30pm	UAA Park	Hamish Kleijn
Norths Devils (W)	24 – 14	Sunshine Coast Falcons (W)	Saturday, 14 June, 4:00pm	Bishop Park	Sam Kalpakidis
Souths Logan Magpies (W)	38 – 10	Wynnum Manly Seagulls (W)	Sunday, 15 June, 12:05pm	Davies Park	Izzy Davidson
Round 2
Western Clydesdales (W)	30 – 14	Northern Pride (W)	Saturday, 21 June, 1:00pm	Toowoomba Sports Ground	Sam Kalpakidis
Tweed Heads Seagulls (W)	10 – 20	Ipswich Jets (W)	Saturday, 21 June, 1:00pm	Piggabeen Sports Complex	Hamish Kleijn
Burleigh Bears (W)	4 – 26	Souths Logan Magpies (W)	Saturday, 21 June, 1:30pm	UAA Park	Trey Hubert
Sunshine Coast Falcons (W)	20 – 14	Wynnum Manly Seagulls (W)	Saturday, 21 June, 3:30pm	Sunshine Coast Stadium	Benjamin Seppala
Central Queensland Capras (W)	4 – 36	Norths Devils (W)	Saturday, 21 June, 4:00pm	Rugby Park	Jacob Gregg
Brisbane Tigers (W)	34 – 8	Mackay Cutters (W)	Sunday, 22 June, 12:05pm	Totally Workwear Stadium	Izzy Davidson
Round 3
Tweed Heads Seagulls (W)	8 – 38	Burleigh Bears (W)	Saturday, 28 June, 1:00pm	Piggabeen Sports Complex	Sam Kalpakidis
Mackay Cutters (W)	30 – 4	Central Queensland Capras (W)	Saturday, 28 June, 2:00pm	BB Print Stadium	Trey Hubert
Northern Pride (W)	20 – 14	Wynnum Manly Seagulls (W)	Saturday, 28 June, 3:20pm	Barlow Park	Hamish Kleijn
Sunshine Coast Falcons (W)	22 – 18	Western Clydesdales (W)	Sunday, 29 June, 12:05pm	Sunshine Coast Stadium	Scott Rothery
Norths Devils (W)	24 – 28	Souths Logan Magpies (W)	Sunday, 29 June, 12:50pm	Bishop Park	Izzy Davidson
Ipswich Jets (W)	16 – 24	Brisbane Tigers (W)	Sunday, 29 June, 2:00pm	North Ipswich Reserve	Jacob Gregg
Round 4
Burleigh Bears (W)	30 – 12	Norths Devils (W)	Saturday, 5 July, 1:30pm	UAA Park	Scott Rothery
Mackay Cutters (W)	14 – 30	Sunshine Coast Falcons (W)	Saturday, 5 July, 2:00pm	BB Print Stadium	Nic Bowyer
Wynnum Manly Seagulls (W)	20 – 16	Central Queensland Capras (W)	Saturday, 5 July, 3:00pm	Stafford Park	Jacob Gregg
Ipswich Jets (W)	10 – 42	Northern Pride (W)	Sunday, 6 July, 12:05pm	North Ipswich Reserve	Sam Kalpakidis
Souths Logan Magpies (W)	14 – 18	Brisbane Tigers (W)	Sunday, 6 July, 12:20pm	Davies Park	Izzy Davidson
Western Clydesdales (W)	20 – 16	Tweed Heads Seagulls (W)	Sunday, 6 July, 12:20pm	Toowoomba Sports Ground	Trey Hubert
Round 5
Brisbane Tigers (W)	36 – 10	Sunshine Coast Falcons (W)	Saturday, 12 July, 1:00pm	Totally Workwear Stadium	Hamish Kleijn
Mackay Cutters (W)	22 – 20	Wynnum Manly Seagulls (W)	Saturday, 12 July, 1:30pm	BB Print Stadium	Thomas Horne
Northern Pride (W)	16 – 26	Burleigh Bears (W)	Saturday, 12 July, 3:20pm	Barlow Park	Thomas Lawrence
Central Queensland Capras (W)	4 – 30	Western Clydesdales (W)	Saturday, 12 July, 4:00pm	Rugby Park	Ryan Littleford
Ipswich Jets (W)	10 – 42	Norths Devils (W)	Sunday, 13 July, 12:05pm	North Ipswich Reserve	Izzy Davidson
Tweed Heads Seagulls (W)	4 – 36	Souths Logan Magpies (W)	Sunday, 13 July, 1:00pm	Piggabeen Sports Complex	Nick McEwan
Round 6
Burleigh Bears (W)	12 – 18	Brisbane Tigers (W)	Saturday, 19 July, 1:30pm	UAA Park	Hamish Kleijn
Central Queensland Capras (W)	18 – 18	Tweed Heads Seagulls (W)	Saturday, 19 July, 2:00pm	Rugby Park	Fletcher Shearman
Norths Devils (W)	22 – 10	Mackay Cutters (W)	Saturday, 19 July, 3:25pm	Bishop Park	Izzy Davidson
Sunshine Coast Falcons (W)	20 – 22	Northern Pride (W)	Saturday, 19 July, 3:30pm	Sunshine Coast Stadium	Sam Kalpakidis
Souths Logan Magpies (W)	20 – 16	Western Clydesdales (W)	Sunday, 20 July, 10:20am	BMD Kougari Oval	Jacob Gregg
Wynnum Manly Seagulls (W)	22 – 28	Ipswich Jets (W)	Sunday, 20 July, 12:05pm	BMD Kougari Oval	Scott Rothery
Round 7 (Women in League Round)
Central Queensland Capras (W)	10 – 34	Sunshine Coast Falcons (W)	Saturday, 9 August, 2:00pm	Rugby Park	Nick McEwan
Wynnum Manly Seagulls (W)	16 – 10	Western Clydesdales (W)	Saturday, 9 August, 3:00pm	Kitchener Park	Izzy Davidson
Northern Pride (W)	20 – 12	Norths Devils (W)	Saturday, 9 August, 3:20pm	Barlow Park	Trey Hubert
Brisbane Tigers (W)	30 – 16	Tweed Heads Seagulls (W)	Sunday, 10 August, 12:05pm	Totally Workwear Stadium	Hamish Kleijn
Souths Logan Magpies (W)	28 – 12	Mackay Cutters (W)	Sunday, 10 August, 1:20pm	Davies Park	Fletcher Shearman
Ipswich Jets (W)	24 – 22	Burleigh Bears (W)	Sunday, 10 August, 3:00pm	North Ipswich Reserve	Benjamin Seppala
Round 8 (Licensed Clubs Round)
Norths Devils (W)	16 – 30	Brisbane Tigers (W)	Friday, 15 August, 7:05pm	Bishop Park	Izzy Davidson
Tweed Heads Seagulls (W)	38 – 18	Wynnum Manly Seagulls (W)	Saturday, 16 August, 1:05pm	Piggabeen Sports Complex	Ryan Littleford
Mackay Cutters (W)	38 – 14	Northern Pride (W)	Saturday, 16 August, 2:00pm	BB Print Stadium	Nick Bowyer
Central Queensland Capras (W)	4 – 36	Burleigh Bears (W)	Saturday, 16 August, 2:00pm	Rugby Park	Fletcher Shearman
Sunshine Coast Falcons (W)	22 – 30	Souths Logan Magpies (W)	Saturday, 16 August, 3:30pm	Sunshine Coast Stadium	Trey Hubert
Western Clydesdales (W)	18 – 16	Ipswich Jets (W)	Saturday, 16 August, 3:45pm	Centenary Oval	Nick McEwan
Round 9
Western Clydesdales (W)	18 – 48	Brisbane Tigers (W)	Saturday, 23 August, 1:00pm	Toowoomba Sports Ground	Izzy Davidson
Wynnum Manly Seagulls (W)	14 – 8	Norths Devils (W)	Saturday, 23 August, 1:20pm	BMD Kougari Oval	Scott Rothery
Ipswich Jets (W)	32 – 12	Sunshine Coast Falcons (W)	Saturday, 23 August, 2:00pm	North Ipswich Reserve	Trey Hubert
Burleigh Bears (W)	34 – 16	Mackay Cutters (W)	Saturday, 23 August, 4:45pm	UAA Park	Nick McEwan
Souths Logan Magpies (W)	38 – 10	Central Queensland Capras (W)	Sunday, 24 August, 12:05pm	Davies Park	Kailey Beattie
Tweed Heads Seagulls (W)	18 – 34	Northern Pride (W)	Sunday, 24 August, 1:00pm	Piggabeen Sports Complex	Fletcher Shearman
Round 10
Northern Pride (W)	44 – 14	Central Queensland Capras (W)	Saturday, 30 August, 3:20pm	Barlow Park	Fletcher Shearman
Norths Devils (W)	16 – 16	Tweed Heads Seagulls (W)	Saturday, 30 August, 3:20pm	Bishop Park	Sam Kalpakidis
Mackay Cutters (W)	16 – 18	Western Clydesdales (W)	Saturday, 30 August, 5:00pm	BB Print Stadium	Nicholas Bowyer
Sunshine Coast Falcons (W)	20 – 20	Burleigh Bears (W)	Sunday, 31 August, 12:05pm	Sunshine Coast Stadium	Sam Kalpakidis
Souths Logan Magpies (W)	22 – 24	Ipswich Jets (W)	Sunday, 31 August, 12:20pm	Davies Park	Benjamin Seppala
Wynnum Manly Seagulls (W)	14 – 28	Brisbane Tigers (W)	Sunday, 31 August, 1:20pm	BMD Kougari Oval	Kailey Beattie
Round 11
Burleigh Bears (W)	16 – 22	Wynnum Manly Seagulls (W)	Saturday, 6 September, 12:00pm	UAA Park	Benjamin Seppala
Brisbane Tigers (W)	36 – 4	Central Queensland Capras (W)	Saturday, 6 September, 1:00pm	Totally Workwear Stadium	Fletcher Shearman
Western Clydesdales (W)	18 – 24	Norths Devils (W)	Saturday, 6 September, 4:45pm	Glenholme Park	Sam Kalpakidis
Sunshine Coast Falcons (W)	44 – 12	Tweed Heads Seagulls (W)	Sunday, 7 September, 12:00pm	Kawana Sports Precinct	Hamish Kleijn
Ipswich Jets (W)	24 – 24	Mackay Cutters (W)	Sunday, 7 September, 12:05pm	North Ipswich Reserve	Ryan Littleford
Northern Pride (W)	20 – 22	Souths Logan Magpies (W)	Sunday, 7 September, 1:00pm	Barlow Park	Nick McEwan
Finals Series
Elimination Finals
Burleigh Bears (W)	44 – 6	Norths Devils (W)	Saturday, 13 September, 12:05pm	UAA Park	Trey Hubert
Ipswich Jets (W)	12 – 30	Northern Pride (W)	Sunday, 14 September, 12:05pm	North Ipswich Reserve	Hamish Kleijn
Semi-Finals
Brisbane Tigers (W)	20 – 10	Northern Pride (W)	Saturday, 20 September, 12:05pm	Totally Workwear Stadium	Hamish Kleijn
Souths Logan Magpies (W)	12 – 24	Burleigh Bears (W)	Sunday, 21 September, 12:05pm	Davies Park	Izzy Davidson
Grand Final
Brisbane Tigers (W)	V	Burleigh Bears (W)	Saturday, 27 September, 2:05pm	Kayo Stadium	TBA

==== Grand Final ====
Elimination Finals
4	Ipswich	12
5	Northern	30
3	Burleigh	44
6	Norths	6

Semi-Finals
1	Brisbane	20
5	Northern	10
2	Souths Logan	12
3	Burleigh	24

Grand Final
1	Brisbane
3	Burleigh

2025 Queensland Women's Premiership Grand Final

Saturday, 27 September 2025
2:05pm

Brisbane Tigers (W)	v	Burleigh Bears (W)

Kayo Stadium, Brisbane

=== NRLQ Series ===
The NRLQ Series is an under 20s Rugby League competition in Queensland. It features the four Queensland based NRL teams and is designed to bridge the gap between the Mal Meninga Cup and Queensland Cup.

In 2025 there will be no finals series, with the top ranked team being declared the winner.

==== Teams ====
Colours	Club	NRL Affiliate	Home ground(s)	Head coach
	Brisbane Broncos (U20s)		Multiple	TBA
	Dolphins (U20s)		Kayo Stadium	TBA
	Gold Coast Titans (U20s)		Multiple	TBA
	North Queensland Cowboys (U20s)		Queensland Country Bank Stadium, Townsville Sports Reserve	TBA

==== Ladder ====
Pos	Team	Pld	W	D	L	B	PF	PA	PD	Pts	Qualification
1	Dolphins (U20s)	6	6	0	0	0	240	102	+138	12	Premiers
2	Brisbane Broncos (U20s)	6	3	0	3	0	166	178	–12	6	
3	North Queensland Cowboys (U20s)	6	2	0	4	0	118	150	–32	4	
4	Gold Coast Titans (U20s)	6	1	0	5	0	116	210	–94	2	

Updated to match(es) played on 1 September. Source:
Rules for classification: 1) points; 2) point difference; 3) points scored

===== Ladder progression =====
- Numbers highlighted in green indicate that the team finished first on the ladder in that round.
- Numbers highlighted in red indicates the team finished last place on the ladder in that round.

Pos	Team	1	2	3	4	5	6
1	Dolphins (U20s)	2	4	6	8	10	12
2	Brisbane Broncos (U20s)	0	2	2	4	6	6
3	North Queensland Cowboys (U20s)	2	2	4	4	4	4
4	Gold Coast Titans (U20s)	0	0	0	0	0	2

Season Results:

Home	Score	Away	Match Information
Home	Score	Away	Date and Time	Venue	Referee	Video
Round 1
Gold Coast Titans (U20s)	22 – 40	Dolphins (U20s)	Saturday, 31 May, 12:35pm	Cbus Super Stadium	Tori Wilkie
North Queensland Cowboys (U20s)	36 – 16	Brisbane Broncos (U20s)	Saturday, 31 May, 3:00pm	Queensland Country Bank Stadium	Conor Wilson
Round 2
Brisbane Broncos (U20s)	34 – 24	Gold Coast Titans (U20s)	Saturday, 7 June, 1:15pm	Toowoomba Sports Ground	Dylan Lawrence
North Queensland Cowboys (U20s)	10 – 32	Dolphins (U20s)	Saturday, 7 June, 1:30pm	Townsville Sports Reserve	Tori Wilkie
Round 3
Gold Coast Titans (U20s)	4 – 24	North Queensland Cowboys (U20s)	Saturday, 28 June, 11:15am	Piggabeen Sports Complex	Rochelle Tamarua
Brisbane Broncos (U20s)	12 – 34	Dolphins (U20s)	Saturday, 28 June, 12:15pm	BMD Kougari Oval	Tori Wilkie
Round 4
Dolphins (U20s)	44 – 10	North Queensland Cowboys (U20s)	Saturday, 5 July, 2:00pm	Kayo Stadium	Rochelle Tamarua
Gold Coast Titans (U20s)	20 – 42	Brisbane Broncos (U20s)	Sunday, 6 July, 4:05pm	North Ipswich Reserve	Adam Rossiter
Round 5
Brisbane Broncos (U20s)	30 – 26	North Queensland Cowboys (U20s)	Sunday, 27 July, 1:00pm	Kayo Stadium	Hamish Kleijn
Dolphins (U20s)	58 – 22	Gold Coast Titans (U20s)	Sunday, 27 July, 3:00pm	Kayo Stadium	Rochelle Tamarua
Round 6
North Queensland Cowboys (U20s)	12 – 24	Gold Coast Titans (U20s)	Saturday, 2 August, 1:30pm	Townsville Sports Reserve	Izzy Davidson
Dolphins (U20s)	32 – 26	Brisbane Broncos (U20s)	Saturday, 9 August, 3:00pm	Suncorp Stadium	Rochelle Tamarua

== See also ==
- 2025 QRL Feeder Competitions
- 2025 NSWRL Major Competitions
- 2025 NSWRL Feeder Competitions
