= 2021 Hastings Deering Colts season =

2021 Hastings Deering Colts
- Teams: 14
- Premiers: Wynnum Manly Seagulls (1st title)
- Minor premiers: Wynnum Manly Seagulls (1st title)
- Player of the year: Cruise Ten ( Souths Logan Magpies)

The 2021 Hastings Deering Colts season was the 4th season of the under-21 competition, sponsored by Hastings Deering and run by the Queensland Rugby League. The draw and structure of the competition mirrors that of its senior counterpart, the Queensland Cup.

The Sunshine Coast Falcons are the defending premiers, having won the competition in 2019 as the 2020 competition was cancelled due the COVID-19 pandemic.

== Teams ==
In 2021, the lineup of teams remains unchanged for the second consecutive year.

Colours	Club	Home ground(s)	Head coach(s)	Captain(s)	NRL affiliate
	Burleigh Bears	Pizzey Park	Jamie Mahon	Cameron Brown/Blake Campbell	Gold Coast Titans
	Central Queensland Capras	Browne Park	Lionel Harbin	Riley Shadlow	Brisbane Broncos
	Brisbane Tigers	Langlands Park	Mark Gliddon	Joseph Gilmour/Eli Daunt	Melbourne Storm
	Ipswich Jets	North Ipswich Reserve	Chris Ash	Isaac Fels	Newcastle Knights
	Mackay Cutters	BB Print Stadium	Tom Heggie	Daniel Kelly/Ethan Borg	North Queensland Cowboys
	Northern Pride	Barlow Park	Dave Scott	Adam Hepworth/Matti Moyle	North Queensland Cowboys
	Norths Devils	Pathion Park	Rhett Tronc	Zak McGuire	Brisbane Broncos
	Redcliffe Dolphins	Dolphin Stadium	Scott Murray	Sam Thompson	New Zealand Warriors
	Souths Logan Magpies	Davies Park	Lincoln McLeod	Cruise Ten	Brisbane Broncos
	Sunshine Coast Falcons	Sunshine Coast Stadium	Jamie Vogler	Jaiden Zanchetta	Melbourne Storm
	Townsville Blackhawks	Jack Manski Oval	David Elliott	Curtis Dempsey	North Queensland Cowboys
	Tweed Heads Seagulls	Piggabeen Sports Complex	Matt King	Ben Liyou	Gold Coast Titans
	Western Mustangs	Gold Park	Eugene Seddon	Jordan Crocker/Luke Maiden	Gold Coast Titans
	Wynnum Manly Seagulls	BMD Kougari Oval	Michael Dobson	Jacob Sturt	Brisbane Broncos

== Ladder ==
2021 Hastings Deering Colts
Pos	Team	Pld	W	D	L	PF	PA	PD	Pts
1	Wynnum Manly Seagulls	14	12	1	1	574	220	354	25
2	Townsville Blackhawks	14	9	0	5	521	274	247	18
3	Redcliffe Dolphins	14	9	0	5	506	314	192	18
4	Sunshine Coast Falcons	14	9	0	5	518	344	174	18
5	Brisbane Tigers	14	9	0	5	460	360	100	18
6	Tweed Heads Seagulls	14	9	0	5	436	343	93	18
7	Souths Logan Magpies	14	8	0	6	487	406	81	16
8	Mackay Cutters	14	7	2	5	394	370	24	16
9	Burleigh Bears	14	7	0	7	452	388	64	14
10	Norths Devils	14	6	1	7	410	396	14	11
11	Central Queensland Capras	14	6	0	8	376	524	-148	12
12	Northern Pride	14	4	0	10	292	598	-306	8
13	Western Mustangs	14	1	0	13	226	704	-478	2
14	Ipswich Jets	14	0	0	14	246	657	-411	0

== Final series ==
Home	Score	Away	Match Information
Home	Score	Away	Date	Venue
Qualifying & Elimination Finals
Townsville Blackhawks	16 – 40	Redcliffe Dolphins	18 September 2021	Moreton Daily Stadium
Wynnum Manly Seagulls	16 – 36	Sunshine Coast Falcons	19 September 2021	BMD Kougari Oval
Brisbane Tigers	14 – 38	Mackay Cutters	19 September 2021	Marsden State High School
Tweed Heads Seagulls	6 – 78	Souths Logan Magpies	19 September 2021	Bishop Park
Semi-finals
Wynnum Manly Seagulls	39 – 28	Mackay Cutters	25 September 2021	Tugun RLFC
Townsville Blackhawks	26 – 6	Souths Logan Magpies	26 September 2021	Pizzey Park
Preliminary Finals
Sunshine Coast Falcons	12 – 54	Townsville Blackhawks	2 October 2021	Moreton Daily Stadium
Redcliffe Dolphins	22 – 32	Wynnum Manly Seagulls	2 October 2021	Moreton Daily Stadium
Grand Final
Wynnum Manly Seagulls	17 – 16	Townsville Blackhawks	10 October 2021	Moreton Daily Stadium
