= 2020 Hastings Deering Colts season =

2020 Hastings Deering Colts
- Teams: 14

The 2020 Hastings Deering Colts season was the 3rd season of the under-20 competition, sponsored by Hastings Deering and run by the Queensland Rugby League. The draw and structure of the competition mirrors that of its senior counterpart, the Queensland Cup.

The Sunshine Coast Falcons are the defending premiers.

== Teams ==
In 2020, the lineup of teams remained unchanged for the second consecutive year.

Colours	Club	Home ground(s)	Head coach(s)	Captain(s)	NRL affiliate
	Burleigh Bears	Pizzey Park	Jamie Mahon	TBA	Gold Coast Titans
	Central Queensland Capras	Browne Park	Lionel Harbin	TBA	Brisbane Broncos
	Easts Tigers	Langlands Park	Ben King	TBA	Melbourne Storm
	Ipswich Jets	North Ipswich Reserve	TBA	TBA	Newcastle Knights
	Mackay Cutters	BB Print Stadium	Michael Comerford	TBA	North Queensland Cowboys
	Northern Pride	Barlow Park	Dave Scott	TBA	North Queensland Cowboys
	Norths Devils	Pathion Park	TBA	TBA	Brisbane Broncos
	Redcliffe Dolphins	Dolphin Stadium	TBA	TBA	Brisbane Broncos
	Souths Logan Magpies	Davies Park	TBA	TBA	Brisbane Broncos
	Sunshine Coast Falcons	Sunshine Coast Stadium	TBA	TBA	Melbourne Storm
	Townsville Blackhawks	Jack Manski Oval	David Elliott	TBA	North Queensland Cowboys
	Tweed Heads Seagulls	Piggabeen Sports Complex	Matt King	TBA	Gold Coast Titans
	Western Mustangs	Gold Park	Eugene Seddon	TBA	Gold Coast Titans
	Wynnum Manly Seagulls	BMD Kougari Oval	Glen Dreger	TBA	Brisbane Broncos

== Ladder ==
2020 Hastings Deering Colts
Pos	Team	Pld	W	D	L	PF	PA	PD	Pts
1	Burleigh Bears	0	0	0	0	0	0	0	0
2	Central Queensland Capras	0	0	0	0	0	0	0	0
3	Easts Tigers	0	0	0	0	0	0	0	0
4	Ipswich Jets	0	0	0	0	0	0	0	0
5	Mackay Cutters	0	0	0	0	0	0	0	0
6	Northern Pride	0	0	0	0	0	0	0	0
7	Norths Devils	0	0	0	0	0	0	0	0
8	Redcliffe Dolphins	0	0	0	0	0	0	0	0
9	Souths Logan Magpies	0	0	0	0	0	0	0	0
10	Sunshine Coast Falcons	0	0	0	0	0	0	0	0
11	Townsville Blackhawks	0	0	0	0	0	0	0	0
12	Tweed Heads Seagulls	0	0	0	0	0	0	0	0
13	Western Mustangs	0	0	0	0	0	0	0	0
14	Wynnum Manly Seagulls	0	0	0	0	0	0	0	0
