= Sunshine Coast Spartans =

Australian gridiron club, based on Sunshine Coast, QLD

- Full name: Sunshine Coast Spartans Gridiron Club
- Sport: Gridiron (American football)
- Founded: 2009; 17 years ago
- League: Gridiron Queensland
- Home ground: Stockland fields -Kawana
- President: Ben Gough
- Head coach: Brendan Phillips

Strip
- Burnt Orange / White

The Sunshine Coast Spartans are a gridiron football club competing in the Gridiron Queensland league. The club is situated on Queensland's Sunshine Coast and plays out of the Stockland fields at Stockland Stadium.

== History ==
The Sunshine Coast Spartans gained registration to Gridiron Queensland in 2009. The Junior Spartans took out the Sunbowl against Hot-favourites Northside Rhinos 12–0, for the Sunshine Coast Spartans First Championship.

2016 saw the Senior men's team reaching the playoffs for the first time after having its first winning season in team history. Finishing ranked #17 in the nation.

== Team Awards ==
=== MVP ===
- 2012

Juniors:
Rising Star: Jason Gough
Offensive MVP: Benjamin Gough
Defensive & Overall MVP: Michael Mvp Gilmour

Seniors:
Offensive line: Errol Hearn
Offensive Back: Warwick Russell
Offensive MVP: Shane Grace
Defensive line: Albert Wolfgramm
Defensive back: Fitzsimon Jack & Storm DeSmeth
Defensive MVP: Christian Christian O'Dea
Rookie of the year: Leith Rutledge
Senior MVP: Shannon Grant Moen
Spartan of the year: Matthew Noonan

== See also ==
- Gridiron Queensland
- American football
