= 2019 Hastings Deering Colts =

- Teams: 14
- Premiers: Sunshine Coast Falcons (1st title)
- Minor premiers: Townsville Blackhawks (2nd title)
- Matches played: 149
- Top points scorer(s): Adam Cook (204)
- Player of the year: Tom McGrath
- Top try-scorer(s): Jayden Campbell (21)

The 2019 Hastings Deering Colts season was the 2nd season of the under-20 competition, sponsored by Hastings Deering and run by the Queensland Rugby League. The draw and structure of the competition mirrored that of its senior counterpart, the Queensland Cup.

The Sunshine Coast Falcons won their first premiership, defeating the Wynnum Manly Seagulls in the Grand Final.

== Teams ==
The Victoria Thunderbolts moved to the New South Wales-run Jersey Flegg Cup in 2019, leaving the competition with fourteen sides, thirteen based in Queensland and one in northern New South Wales. 13 Queensland Cup teams field a side in the competition, with each team affiliated with an NRL club.

Colours	Club	Home ground(s)	Head coach(s)	Captain(s)	NRL affiliate
	Burleigh Bears	Pizzey Park	Jamie Mahon	Tyler Szepanowski	Gold Coast Titans
	Central Queensland Capras	Browne Park	Damien Seibold	Ryan Flintham & Zaine Hammond	Brisbane Broncos
	Easts Tigers	Langlands Park	Ben King	Zac Teevan	Melbourne Storm
	Ipswich Jets	North Ipswich Reserve	Brendon Marshall	Josh Williams	Brisbane Broncos
	Mackay Cutters	BB Print Stadium	Michael Comerford	Brendan White	North Queensland Cowboys
	Northern Pride	Barlow Park	Dave Scott	Simon Bevan & Joshtel Charlie	North Queensland Cowboys
	Norths Devils	Bishop Park	Kevin Neighbour	Jake Strasser	Brisbane Broncos
	Redcliffe Dolphins	Dolphin Stadium	Andrew Wynyard	Jayden Newbould	Brisbane Broncos
	Souths Logan Magpies	Davies Park	Shayne Boyd	Jacob Alick	Brisbane Broncos
	Sunshine Coast Falcons	Sunshine Coast Stadium	Sean Mawhinney	Jack Wright	Melbourne Storm
	Townsville Blackhawks	Jack Manski Oval	David Elliott	Nathan Barrett	North Queensland Cowboys
	Tweed Heads Seagulls	Piggabeen Sports Complex	Matt King	Tahne Robinson	Gold Coast Titans
	Western Mustangs	Gold Park	Eugene Seddon	Blake Cullen	Gold Coast Titans
	Wynnum Manly Seagulls	BMD Kougari Oval	Joe O'Callaghan	Shannon Gardiner	Brisbane Broncos

== Ladder ==
2019 Hastings Deering Colts
Pos	Team	Pld	W	D	L	B	PF	PA	PD	Pts
1	Townsville Blackhawks	20	16	1	3	3	639	235	+404	39
2	Burleigh Bears	20	16	1	3	3	695	308	+387	39
3	Wynnum Manly Seagulls	20	16	0	3	3	638	344	-294	39
4	Sunshine Coast Falcons (P)	20	14	0	6	3	576	328	+248	34
5	Mackay Cutters	20	13	0	7	3	530	300	+230	32
6	Norths Devils	20	11	1	8	3	504	461	+43	29
7	Easts Tigers	20	9	2	9	3	434	414	+20	26
8	Tweed Heads Seagulls	20	9	2	9	3	425	437	-12	26
9	Northern Pride	20	9	0	11	3	361	483	-122	24
10	Central Queensland Capras	20	6	2	12	3	368	486	-118	20
11	Souths Logan Magpies	20	7	0	13	3	441	606	-165	20
12	Redcliffe Dolphins	20	3	1	16	3	282	646	-364	13
13	Western Mustangs	20	3	0	17	3	309	768	-459	12
14	Ipswich Jets	20	1	3	16	3	258	644	-386	11

== Final series ==
Home	Score	Away	Match Information
Home	Score	Away	Date and Time (Local)	Venue
Qualifying & Elimination Finals
Norths Devils	40 – 20	Easts Tigers	8 September 2019, 11:20am	Bishop Park
Burleigh Bears	19 – 24	Wynnum Manly Seagulls	8 September 2019, 12:15pm	BMD Kougari Oval
Townsville Blackhawks	4 – 24	Sunshine Coast Falcons	8 September 2019, 12:15pm	Sunshine Coast Stadium
Mackay Cutters	23 – 10	Tweed Heads Seagulls	9 September 2019, 1:40pm	Piggabeen Sports Complex
Semi-finals
Townsville Blackhawks	6 – 30	Mackay Cutters	14 September 2019, 2:30pm	Jack Manski Oval
Burleigh Bears	42 – 12	Norths Devils	14 September 2019, 4:00pm	Pizzey Park
Preliminary Finals
Wynnum Manly Seagulls	34 – 6	Mackay Cutters	21 September 2019, 1:00pm	Jack Manski Oval
Sunshine Coast Falcons	23 – 16	Burleigh Bears	22 September 2019, 1:10pm	Pizzey Park
Grand Final
Wynnum Manly Seagulls	28 – 34	Sunshine Coast Falcons	29 September 2019, 1:00pm	Dolphin Stadium

Qualifying and elimination finals
8 Sept, Sunshine Coast Stadium
1	Townsville	4
4	Sunshine Coast	24
8 Sept, Bishop Park
5	Norths	40
8	Easts	20
9 Sept, Piggabeen Sports Complex
6	Mackay	23
7	Tweed Heads	10
8 Sept, BMD Kougari Oval
2	Burleigh	19
3	Wynnum Manly	24

Semi-finals
14 Sept, Jack Manski Oval
Townsville	6
Mackay	30
14 Sept, Pizzey Park
Burleigh	42
Norths	12

Preliminary finals
21 Sept, Jack Manski Oval
Wynnum Manly	34
Mackay	6
22 Sept, Pizzey Park
Sunshine Coast	23
Burleigh	16

Grand final
29 Sept, Dolphin Stadium
Wynnum Manly	28
Sunshine Coast	34

== Grand Final ==
Sunday, September 29
1:00pm (local time)

Wynnum Manly Seagulls	28 – 34	Sunshine Coast Falcons
Tries: Davin Quinlan (10') 1 Lachlan Perry (20') 1 Dredin Sorensen-McGee (33') 1 Nofoasa Malutoa (44') 1 Goals: Shannon Gardiner 6 (11', 22', 34', 44', 52', 67')	1st: 18 – 12; 2nd: 10 – 22; Report	Tries: 2 (54', 58') Steven Borg; 1 (12') Blake Wilson; 1 (30') Trent Loiero; 1 (39') Luke Murtagh; 1 (64') Tyson Smoothy; Goals: 5 Tyson Smoothy (14', 31', 40', 55', 65')

Dolphin Stadium
Referee: Sam Swift
Player of the Match: Tyson Smoothy (Sunshine Coast)

Team lists:

FB	1	Shannon Gardiner
WG	2	Ryan O'Keefe
CE	3	Eliott Vincent
CE	4	Reece Hoffman
WG	5	Jalen Tangiiti-Turner
FE	6	Will Parslow
HB	7	David Quinlan
PR	8	Brock Richardson (c)
HK	9	Jake Simpkin
PR	10	Clayton Mack
SR	11	Lachlan Perry
SR	12	Dredin Sorensen-McGee
LK	13	Harrison Graham
Substitutes:
IC	14	Jacson Lott
IC	15	Nofoasa Malutoa
IC	16	James Robinson
IC	17	David Butler
Coach: Joe O'Callaghan

FB	1	Luke Murtagh
WG	2	Blake Wilson
CE	3	Kane Jackson
CE	4	Tom Dwan
WG	5	Gian Largiader
FE	6	Jaiden Zanchetta
HB	7	Jack Wright (c)
PR	13	Rowan Jardine
HK	9	Tyson Smoothy
PR	10	Wyatt Reynolds
SR	11	Trent Loiero
SR	12	Steven Borg
LK	20	Mateus Chankay
Substitutes:
IC	14	Zac Green
IC	15	Aaron Nelson
IC	16	Nick Ellems
IC	19	Justin Makirere
Coach: Sam Mawhinney

== Player statistics ==
The following statistics are correct as of the conclusion of Round 23.

=== Leading try scorers ===
Pos	Player	Team	Tries
1	Jayden Campbell	Burleigh Bears	21
2	Tom Dwan	Sunshine Coast Falcons	18
3	Michael McGrath	Norths Devils	18
4	Austin Jennings	Western Mustangs	16
5	Harrison McIndoe	Central Queensland Capras	13

=== Leading point scorers ===
Pos	Player	Team	T	G	FG	Pts
1	Adam Cook	Townsville Blackhawks	7	88	0	204
2	Jayden Campbell	Burleigh Bears	21	48	1	181
3	Brendan White	Mackay Cutters	5	75	0	170
4	Tom Dwan	Sunshine Coast Falcons	18	24	0	120
5	Shannon Gardiner	Wynnum Manly Seagulls	9	40	0	116
