= John Harbin =

English sports coach (rugby league and football)

Personal information
- Full name: John Harbin
- Born: 12 April 1947 (age 79) Hazlewood Castle, Yorkshire, England

Coaching information
Club
Years	Team	Gms	W	D	L	W%
2000–01	Wakefield Trinity Wildcats	28	8	0	20	29
2002–02	Oldham
2010	Yeppoon Seagulls
2011–12	Central Queensland Capras
2019–	Oulton Raiders
	Total	28	8	0	20	29
Association football career
Managerial career
- Years: Team
- 2008: Coventry City (caretaker)

John Harbin (born 12 April 1947) is an Australian sports coach. He first worked in rugby league before beginning a coaching career in association football. His son, Lionel Harbin, briefly played rugby league in the Super League for the Wakefield Trinity Wildcats.

== Early life ==
Born in 1947 at Hazlewood Castle in the English county of Yorkshire, Harbin grew up in Swillington Common before emigrating with his parents to Australia at the age of ten, settling in Queensland. As a child, he played rugby league and was a boxer. After leaving school he completed a teaching degree.

== Coaching career ==
=== Rugby league ===
Harbin returned to England to coach in rugby league in the late 1990s. He was appointed head coach of Wakefield Trinity Wildcats in November 2000. The club had financial problems and were expected to struggle. Wakefield Trinity Wildcats' final game of the 2001 season was a relegation battle with Salford City Reds, and Wakefield Trinity Wildcats won, condemning Huddersfield Giants to the drop. However, he left the club at the end of 2001.

After a brief spell as chief executive officer at Dewsbury Rams, Harbin joined Oldham as head coach in January 2002.

=== Association football ===
Late in 2002 Harbin joined Oldham Athletic as fitness conditioner and sports psychologist, alongside then-assistant, manager Iain Dowie. Dowie was later promoted to manager and moved to Crystal Palace, with Harbin following.

Dowie moved to Charlton Athletic in 2006, and again, appointed Harbin to his coaching staff. After Dowie's sacking in November 2006, Harbin briefly stayed under new manager Les Reed, but departed by the end of 2006. In February 2007, he linked up with Dowie for the fourth time at Coventry City. Striker Leon Best said that after Harbin's fitness sessions he felt he was "definitely the fittest I have ever been". A year later he was placed in a joint-caretaker's role alongside first-team coach Frankie Bunn after the sacking of Dowie. Harbin again followed Iain Dowie to Queens Park Rangers and remained following Dowie's departure in October 2008. Harbin stayed at Loftus Road under new manager Paulo Sousa until Sousa left the club in the summer of 2009. Harbin followed Sousa to Swansea City in July 2009.

=== Australian rugby league ===
After seven years in English Football and only three months at Swansea, Harbin decided to return to Australia to take up a senior coaching role at Yeppoon Rugby League club in the Queensland Rugby League Central Division. He was appointed as head coach of the Central Queensland Capras in September 2011. Harbin later became the manager of the Dreamtime Lodge motel in Rockhampton.

=== Return to English football ===
In June 2013, Harbin was appointed as performance manager at English League Two club Plymouth Argyle by manager John Sheridan. He left his position in June 2015 after new manager Derek Adams decided to appoint his own staff. He was appointed as performance coach at League One club Port Vale by manager Rob Page later in the month. He followed Page to league rivals Northampton Town in May 2016. In June 2017, he returned to Oldham Athletic as a fitness and sports psychology coach.

=== Oulton Raiders ===
On 2 January 2019, Harbin was appointed as head coach of National Conference League side Oulton Raiders.

== Coaching statistics ==
Managerial record by team and tenure
Team	From	To	Record					Ref
Team	From	To	P	W	D	L	Win %	Ref
Wakefield Trinity Wildcats	November 2000	October 2001	28	8	0	20	28.6	
Coventry City F.C. (caretaker)	11 February 2008	19 February 2008	2	0	1	1	0.0	
