= 2018 Hastings Deering Colts season =

2018 Hastings Deering Colts
- Teams: 15
- Premiers: Norths Devils (1st title)
- Minor premiers: Townsville Blackhawks (1st title)
- Matches played: 143
- Points scored: 7,251
- Top points scorer(s): Shannon Gardiner (191)
- Player of the year: Shannon Gardiner
- Top try-scorer(s): Riley Moore (16)

The 2018 Hastings Deering Colts season was the 1st season of the under-20 competition, sponsored by Hastings Deering and run by the Queensland Rugby League. Replacing the National Rugby League's National Youth Competition, the draw and structure of the competition mirrored that of its senior counterpart, the Queensland Cup.

Norths Devils were the inaugural premiers, defeating the Townsville Blackhawks in the Grand Final.

== Teams ==
The inaugural season of the Hastings Deering Colts featured 15 teams, thirteen based in Queensland, one in northern New South Wales and one in Victoria. 13 Queensland Cup teams fielded a side in the competition, with the two unaffiliated clubs being the Victoria Thunderbolts and Western Mustangs. Like their senior counterparts, each team was also affiliated with an NRL club.

| Colours | Club | Home ground(s) | Head coach(s) | Captain(s) | NRL affiliate |
|---|---|---|---|---|---|
| | Burleigh Bears | Pizzey Park | Jamie Mahon | Apiata Noema | Gold Coast Titans |
| | Central Queensland Capras | Browne Park | Neil Beckett & Damien Seibold | Ryan Flintham & Zaine Hammond | None |
| | Easts Tigers | Suzuki Stadium | Ian Gough | Nathan Brown | Melbourne Storm |
| | Ipswich Jets | North Ipswich Reserve | Brendon Marshall | Shar Walden | Brisbane Broncos |
| | Mackay Cutters | BB Print Stadium | ~~Jim Wilson~~ → Michael Comerford | Brendan White | North Queensland Cowboys |
| | Northern Pride | Barlow Park | Dave Scott | Patrick Gallen | North Queensland Cowboys |
| | Norths Devils | Bishop Park | Kevin Neighbour | Kobe Hetherington & Joe McGuire | Brisbane Broncos |
| | Redcliffe Dolphins | Dolphin Stadium | Chris Little | Oscar Carter | Brisbane Broncos |
| | Souths Logan Magpies | Davies Park | Shayne Boyd | Rory Ferguson | Brisbane Broncos |
| | Sunshine Coast Falcons | Sunshine Coast Stadium | Michael Buckley | Stephen Buckley | Melbourne Storm |
| | Townsville Blackhawks | Jack Manski Oval | David Tangata-Toa | Duarne Dempsey & Sam Martin-Savage | North Queensland Cowboys |
| | Tweed Heads Seagulls | Piggabeen Sports Complex | Steve Dowd | Bostyn Hakaraia | Gold Coast Titans |
| | Victoria Thunderbolts | Casey Fields & Haines Drive Reserve | Ben Jack | Matt Stimson | Melbourne Storm |
| | Western Mustangs | Gold Park | Eugene Seddon | James Robinson | Gold Coast Titans |
| | Wynnum Manly Seagulls | BMD Kougari Oval | Joe O'Callaghan | Shannon Gardiner & Mitipere Tuatai | Brisbane Broncos |

== Regular season ==
| Team | 1 | 2 | 3 | 4 | 5 | 6 | 7 | 8 | 9 | 10 | 11 | 12 | 13 | 14 | 15 | 16 | 17 | 18 | 19 | 20 | 21 | 22 | 23 | 24 |
|---|---|---|---|---|---|---|---|---|---|---|---|---|---|---|---|---|---|---|---|---|---|---|---|---|
| Burleigh Bears | **SUN**; **4** | RED; 8 | **TWE**; **4** | SOU; 14 | X | WES; 46 | **VIC**; **18** | **CQL**; **22** | **TVL**; **14** | X | EAS; 38 | MKY; 8 | **IPS**; **6** | NPR; 1 | X | TWE; 26 | NOR; 38 | **RED**; **14** | X | VIC; 16 | WYN; 26 | X | TVL; 16 | **EAS**; **50** |
| Central Queensland Capras | EAS; 8 | NOR; 2 | **MKY**; **2** | X | IPS; 48 | **SOU**; **6** | NPR; 50 | BUR; 22 | **SUN**; **2** | X | **VIC**; **14** | X | TVL; 14 | **TWE**; **26** | X | MKY; 14 | SOU; 13 | **NOR**; **8** | X | **WYN**; **14** | **NPR**; **32** | **IPS**; **10** | SUN; 24 | WES; 58 |
| Easts Tigers | **CQL**; **8** | MKY; 17 | VIC; 44 | SUN; 16 | RED; 20 | **NPR**; **34** | **TWE**; **4** | NOR; 42 | **SOU**; **12** | X | **BUR**; **38** | **WYN**; **28** | WES; 12 | **TVL**; **30** | X | **IPS**; **24** | X | **MKY**; **2** | X | **NOR**; **4** | TWE; 10 | **SUN**; **46** | SOU; 14 | BUR; 50 |
| Ipswich Jets | X | TVL; 44 | **WES**; **6** | WYN; 24 | **CQL**; **48** | MKY; 14 | **SUN**; **36** | RED; 24 | X | **TWE**; **30** | NOR; 26 | X | BUR; 6 | **WES**; **18** | X | EAS; 24 | **MKY**; **6** | **TVL**; **14** | X | **RED**; **48** | SUN; 8 | CQL; 10 | **VIC**; **40** | **SOU**; **24** |
| Mackay Cutters | TVL; 24 | **EAS**; **17** | CQL; 2 | **NPR**; **8** | X | **IPS**; **14** | RED; 0 | SUN; 4 | **NOR**; **16** | **WES**; **18** | X | **BUR**; **8** | WYN; 0 | **VIC**; **6** | X | **CQL**; **14** | IPS; 6 | EAS; 2 | X | **TWE**; **12** | **RED**; **1** | NPR; 1 | NOR; 18 | X |
| Northern Pride | X | **SOU**; **2** | **TVL**; **0** | MKY; 8 | X | EAS; 34 | **CQL**; **50** | X | WYN; 4 | **RED**; **1** | **TWE**; **2** | NOR; 10 | SOU; 20 | **BUR**; **1** | X | TVL; 8 | VIC; 12 | **WES**; **28** | X | **SUN**; **60** | CQL; 32 | **MKY**; **1** | RED; 8 | TWE; 4 |
| Norths Devils | TWE; 10 | **CQL**; **2** | **SOU**; **8** | WES; 24 | VIC; 16 | X | **TVL**; **40** | **EAS**; **42** | MKY; 16 | X | IPS; 32 | **NPR**; **10** | **VIC**; **12** | **RED**; **6** | X | WES; 56 | **BUR**; **38** | CQL; 8 | X | EAS; 4 | X | **WYN**; **16** | **MKY**; **18** | SUN; 1 |
| Redcliffe Dolphins | SOU; 0 | **BUR**; **8** | **WYN**; **8** | X | **EAS**; **20** | VIC; 2 | **MKY**; **0** | **IPS**; **24** | X | NPR; 1 | **SUN**; **32** | X | TWE; 42 | **NOR**; **6** | X | WYN; 16 | **WES**; **52** | BUR; 14 | X | IPS; 48 | MKY; 1 | **TVL**; **20** | **NPR**; **8** | VIC; 4 |
| Souths Logan Magpies | **RED**; **0** | NPR; 2 | NOR; 8 | **BUR**; **14** | WYN; 16 | CQL; 6 | **WES**; **24** | **WYN**; **15** | EAS; 12 | X | WES; 8 | VIC; 16 | **NPR**; **20** | **SUN**; **16** | X | X | **CQL**; **13** | **TWE**; **2** | X | TVL; 2 | X | **WES**; **46** | **EAS**; **14** | IPS; 24 |
| Sunshine Coast Falcons | BUR; 4 | WYN; 20 | X | EAS; 16 | WES; 18 | TVL; 12 | IPS; 36 | MKY; 4 | CQL; 2 | X | RED; 32 | TWE; 8 | X | SOU; 16 | X | VIC; 1 | TVL; 4 | WYN; 36 | X | NPR; 60 | IPS; 8 | EAS; 46 | CQL; 24 | NOR; 1 |
| Townsville Blackhawks | **MKY**; **24** | **IPS**; **44** | NPR; 0 | X | TWE; 2 | **SUN**; **12** | NOR; 40 | **VIC**; **22** | BUR; 14 | X | WYN; 15 | WES; 52 | **CQL**; **14** | EAS; 30 | X | **NPR**; **8** | SUN; 4 | IPS; 14 | X | **SOU**; **2** | X | RED; 20 | **BUR**; **16** | **WYN**; **4** |
| Tweed Heads Seagulls | **NOR**; **10** | **VIC**; **20** | BUR; 4 | X | **TVL**; **2** | **WYN**; **8** | EAS; 4 | WES; 13 | X | IPS; 30 | NPR; 2 | SUN; 8 | **RED**; **42** | CQL; 26 | X | **BUR**; **26** | WYN; 26 | SOU; 2 | X | MKY; 12 | **EAS**; **10** | VIC; 38 | X | **NPR**; **4** |
| Victoria Thunderbolts | WES; 42 | TWE; 20 | **EAS**; **44** | X | **NOR**; **16** | **RED**; **2** | BUR; 18 | TVL; 22 | X | **WYN**; **3** | CQL; 14 | **SOU**; **16** | NOR; 12 | MKY; 6 | X | SUN; 1 | **NPR**; **12** | X | X | **BUR**; **16** | **WES**; **58** | **TWE**; **38** | IPS; 40 | **RED**; **4** |
| Western Mustangs | **VIC**; **42** | X | IPS; 6 | **NOR**; **24** | SUN; 18 | **BUR**; **46** | SOU; 24 | **TWE**; **4** | X | MKY; 18 | **SOU**; **8** | **TVL**; **52** | **EAS**; **12** | IPS; 18 | X | **NOR**; **56** | RED; 52 | NPR; 28 | X | X | VIC; 58 | SOU; 46 | **WYN**; **50** | **CQL**; **58** |
| Wynnum Manly Seagulls | X | SUN; 20 | RED; 8 | **IPS**; **24** | **SOU**; **16** | TWE; 8 | X | SOU; 15 | **NPR**; **4** | VIC; 3 | **TVL**; **15** | EAS; 28 | **MKY**; **0** | X | X | **RED**; **16** | **TWE**; **26** | **SUN**; **36** | X | CQL; 14 | **BUR**; **26** | NOR; 16 | WES; 50 | TVL; 4 |
| Team | 1 | 2 | 3 | 4 | 5 | 6 | 7 | 8 | 9 | 10 | 11 | 12 | 13 | 14 | 15 | 16 | 17 | 18 | 19 | 20 | 21 | 22 | 23 | 24 |

Bold – Opposition's Home game
X – Bye
Opponent for round listed above margin

== Ladder ==
2018 Hastings Deering Colts
| Pos | Team | Pld | W | D | L | B | PF | PA | PD | Pts |
|---|---|---|---|---|---|---|---|---|---|---|
| 1 | Townsville Blackhawks | 19 | 15 | 1 | 3 | 5 | 547 | 250 | +297 | 41 |
| 2 | Norths Devils (P) | 19 | 15 | 0 | 4 | 5 | 583 | 378 | +205 | 40 |
| 3 | Northern Pride | 19 | 13 | 1 | 5 | 5 | 566 | 331 | +235 | 37 |
| 4 | Victoria Thunderbolts | 19 | 13 | 0 | 6 | 5 | 632 | 364 | +268 | 36 |
| 5 | Wynnum Manly Seagulls | 19 | 12 | 1 | 6 | 5 | 547 | 402 | +145 | 35 |
| 6 | Souths Logan Magpies | 19 | 12 | 1 | 6 | 5 | 500 | 370 | +130 | 35 |
| 7 | Redcliffe Dolphins | 19 | 10 | 2 | 7 | 5 | 523 | 355 | +168 | 32 |
| 8 | Burleigh Bears | 19 | 11 | 0 | 8 | 5 | 504 | 393 | +111 | 32 |
| 9 | Tweed Heads Seagulls | 19 | 10 | 0 | 9 | 5 | 478 | 516 | -38 | 30 |
| 10 | Sunshine Coast Falcons | 19 | 8 | 0 | 11 | 5 | 477 | 535 | -58 | 26 |
| 11 | Mackay Cutters | 19 | 5 | 2 | 12 | 5 | 345 | 442 | -97 | 22 |
| 12 | Central Queensland Capras | 19 | 6 | 0 | 13 | 5 | 404 | 515 | -111 | 22 |
| 13 | Easts Tigers | 20 | 6 | 0 | 14 | 4 | 351 | 620 | -269 | 20 |
| 14 | Western Mustangs | 19 | 2 | 0 | 17 | 5 | 278 | 850 | -572 | 14 |
| 15 | Ipswich Jets | 19 | 1 | 0 | 18 | 5 | 272 | 686 | -414 | 12 |

== Final series ==
| Home | Score | Away | Match Information |
| Home | Score | Away | Date and Time | Venue |
|---|---|---|---|---|
Elimination finals
| Victoria Thunderbolts | 28 – 6 | Wynnum Manly Seagulls | 31 August 2018, 5:00pm | AAMI Park |
| Northern Pride | 24 – 16 | Souths Logan Magpies | 1 September 2018, 1:00pm | Stan Williams Park |
Major/Minor semi-final
| Townsville Blackhawks | 14 – 18 | Norths Devils | 8 September 2018, 1:00pm | Jack Manski Oval |
| Northern Pride | 32 – 22 | Victoria Thunderbolts | 9 September 2018, 4:00pm | Barlow Park |
Preliminary final
| Townsville Blackhawks | 26 – 22 | Northern Pride | 15 September 2018, 4:00pm | Jack Manski Oval |
Grand Final
| Norths Devils | 20 – 16 | Townsville Blackhawks | 22 September 2018, 1:00pm | Suncorp Stadium |

Elimination Finals
4 | Victoria | 28
5 | Wynnum Manly | 6
3 | Northern Pride | 24
6 | Souths Logan | 16

Major / Minor Semi-finals
1 | Townsville | 14
2 | Norths | 18
3 | Northern Pride | 32
4 | Victoria | 22

Preliminary final
1 | Townsville | 26
3 | Northern Pride | 22

Grand Final
2 | Norths | 20
1 | Townsville | 16

== Grand Final ==
Sunday, September 23
1:00pm (local time)

| Norths Devils | 20 – 16 | Townsville Blackhawks |
|---|---|---|
| Tries: Joe McGuire (8') 1 Nesta Watene (15') 1 Liam Horne (23') 1 David Fauid (63') 1 Goals: Gerome Burns 2 (9', 17') | 1st: 16 – 12; 2nd: 4 – 4 Report | Tries: 1 (28') Duarne Dempsey; 1 (33') Tom McCagh; 1 (69') Ben Condon; Goals: 2 Adam Cook (29', 35') |

Suncorp Stadium
Referee: Daniel Schwass
Player of the Match: Nesta Watene (Norths)

Team lists:

| FB | 1 | David Fauid |
| WG | 2 | Fruean Easthope |
| CE | 3 | Brock Diment |
| CE | 4 | Liam Horne |
| WG | 5 | Jack Paterson |
| FE | 6 | Gerome Burns |
| HB | 7 | Cory Paix |
| PR | 8 | Ethan Bullemor |
| HK | 9 | Kobe Hetherington (c) |
| PR | 10 | Joe McGuire (c) |
| SR | 11 | Nesta Watene |
| SR | 12 | Jordan Riki |
| LK | 13 | Sosefo Filipine |
Substitutes:
| IC | 14 | Zak McGuire |
| IC | 15 | Jake Strasser |
| IC | 16 | Lorenzo Leapai |
| IC | 17 | Reed Young |
Coach: Kevin Neighbour

| FB | 1 | Marshall Hudson |
| WG | 2 | Tom McCagh |
| CE | 3 | Michael Carroll |
| CE | 4 | Lachlan La Rosa |
| WG | 5 | James Conroy |
| FE | 6 | Sam Martin-Savage (c) |
| HB | 7 | Adam Cook |
| PR | 8 | Jayden Stephesns |
| HK | 9 | Sean Mullany |
| PR | 10 | Logan Bayliss-Brow |
| SR | 11 | Campbell Duffy |
| SR | 12 | Ben Condon |
| LK | 13 | Solomon Vasuvulagi |
Substitutes:
| IC | 14 | Enemarki Shibasaki |
| IC | 15 | Jack Althaus |
| IC | 16 | Duarne Dempsey |
| IC | 17 | Nathan Barrett |
Coach: David Tangata-Toa

== Player statistics ==
The following statistics are correct as of the conclusion of Round 24.

=== Leading try scorers ===
| Pos | Player | Team | Tries |
|---|---|---|---|
| 1 | Riley Moore | Sunshine Coast Falcons | 16 |
| 2 | Eli Noovao | CQ Capras | 15 |
| 2 | Jayden O'Shannessy | Mackay Cutters | 15 |
| 4 | Gerome Burns | Norths Devils | 14 |
| 4 | Shannon Gardiner | Wynnum Manly Seagulls | 14 |
| 4 | Rueben Olive | Sunshine Coast Falcons | 14 |
| 4 | Solomon Vasuvulagi | Townsville Blackhawks | 14 |

=== Leading point scorers ===
| Pos | Player | Team | T | G | FG | Pts |
|---|---|---|---|---|---|---|
| 1 | Shannon Gardiner | Wynnum Manly Seagulls | 14 | 67 | 1 | 191 |
| 2 | Oscar Carter | Redcliffe Dolphins | 10 | 70 | - | 182 |
| 3 | Gerome Burns | Norths Devils | 14 | 40 | 1 | 137 |
| 4 | Adam Cook | Townsville Blackhawks | 2 | 62 | 1 | 133 |
| 4 | Kye Oates | Souths Logan Magpies | 7 | 52 | 1 | 133 |
