= Gold Coast Stingrays =

Stingrays
- Full name: Gold Coast Stingrays Gridiron Club
- Sport: Gridiron
- Founded: 1987
- League: Gridiron Queensland
- Home ground: Glennon Park, Nerang
- Anthem: NA
- President: Christine Schulz
- Head coach: Adwela Dawes
- 2017: 1st (State Champions)

Strip
- Columbia blue / Navy Blue / White

The Gold Coast Stingrays are an Australian American football (gridiron) team competing in the Gridiron Queensland league. They are located in Nerang, Queensland on the Gold Coast. The Stingrays are currently the most successful team in the league with 14 Sunbowl wins and 4 losses.
