= Hastings Deering =

Company based in Brisbane, Queensland

- Industry: Heavy equipment, Construction, Mining, Building, Agriculture
- Founded: 1932
- Founder: Harold Hastings Deering
- Headquarters: Archerfield, Queensland, Australia
- Number of locations: 26
- Area served: Queensland; Northern Territory; Papua New Guinea; Solomon Islands; New Caledonia
- Products: Caterpillar Equipment Dealer
- Owner: Sime Derby Berhad
- Number of employees: 3,000
- Website: hastingsdeering.com.au

Hastings Deering is a Caterpillar equipment dealer owned by Malaysian trading conglomerate, Sime Darby Berhad.

== Headquarters ==
Hastings Deering is based in Archerfield, Brisbane, and is the Caterpillar dealer for Queensland and Northern Territory in Australia, Papua New Guinea, the Solomon Islands and New Caledonia.

== Business ==
As a Caterpillar dealer, Hastings Deering supplies earthmoving and mining equipment, engines and power systems to businesses in the agricultural, construction, forestry, government, materials handling, and mining sectors. It has 18 locations in Queensland, 3 in Northern Territory, 3 in Papua New Guinea, and 1 each in the Solomon Islands (Honiara) and New Caledonia (Païta).

In 2022, it announced plans to construct a new Mackay Business Centre on its current Hastings Park site in Mackay. The new facility will replace the current parts warehouse and external storage and is expected to be operational by late 2024.

== History ==
Established in 1932 by Harold Hastings Deering, the Hastings Deering Engineering Company was initially a supplier of Driltech blast hole drills in addition to Caterpillar earthmoving equipment, and later acquired the rights for Exide batteries and other products. The Hastings Deering Group was purchased by Sime Darby Berhad in 1992, and in 1999 Hastings Deering (Australia) Ltd was certified.

== Sponsorships ==
Hastings Deering engages with the community through a variety of partnerships and sponsorships.

In October 2019, it was announced that Hastings Deering would continue as the naming rights sponsor of the Hastings Deering Colts, an under-21 rugby league competition based in Queensland from 2020 until 2022.

In February 2019, Hastings Deering became an Official Partner of the Lions AFLW side, and in 2020, it was announced that the partnership would be extended for a further 2 years.

In February 2022, Australian Carrera Cup Champion, Harri Jones, announced the signing of Hastings Deering as the new naming rights partner.
