= Northside Rhinos =

Brisbane Rhinos
- Full name: Brisbane Rhinos American Football Club
- Nickname: Rhinos
- Sport: Gridiron (American football)
- Founded: 2000
- First season: 2001
- League: Gridiron Queensland
- Home ground: 20 Prospect Rd Mitchelton
- Colours: Red / Gray
- President: Ryan Glasson
- Secretary: Janna Roop

The Brisbane Rhinos are a gridiron football club competing in the Gridiron Queensland league. The club is situated in Mitchelton in the Northern Suburbs of Brisbane, Queensland.

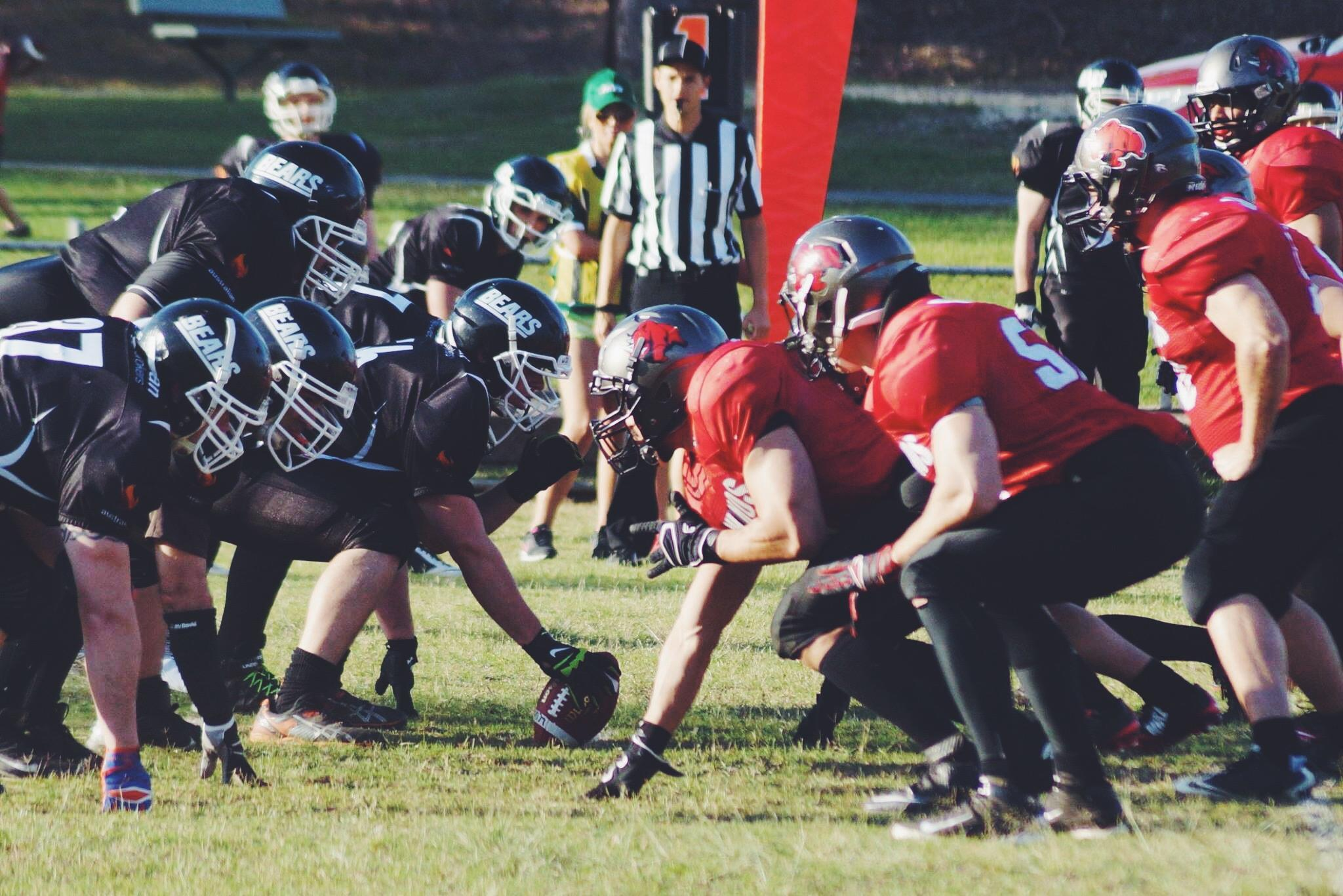
Rhinos take on the Kenmore Bears

== See also ==
- Gridiron Australia
