= Guy Williams (rugby league) =

Australian rugby league footballer

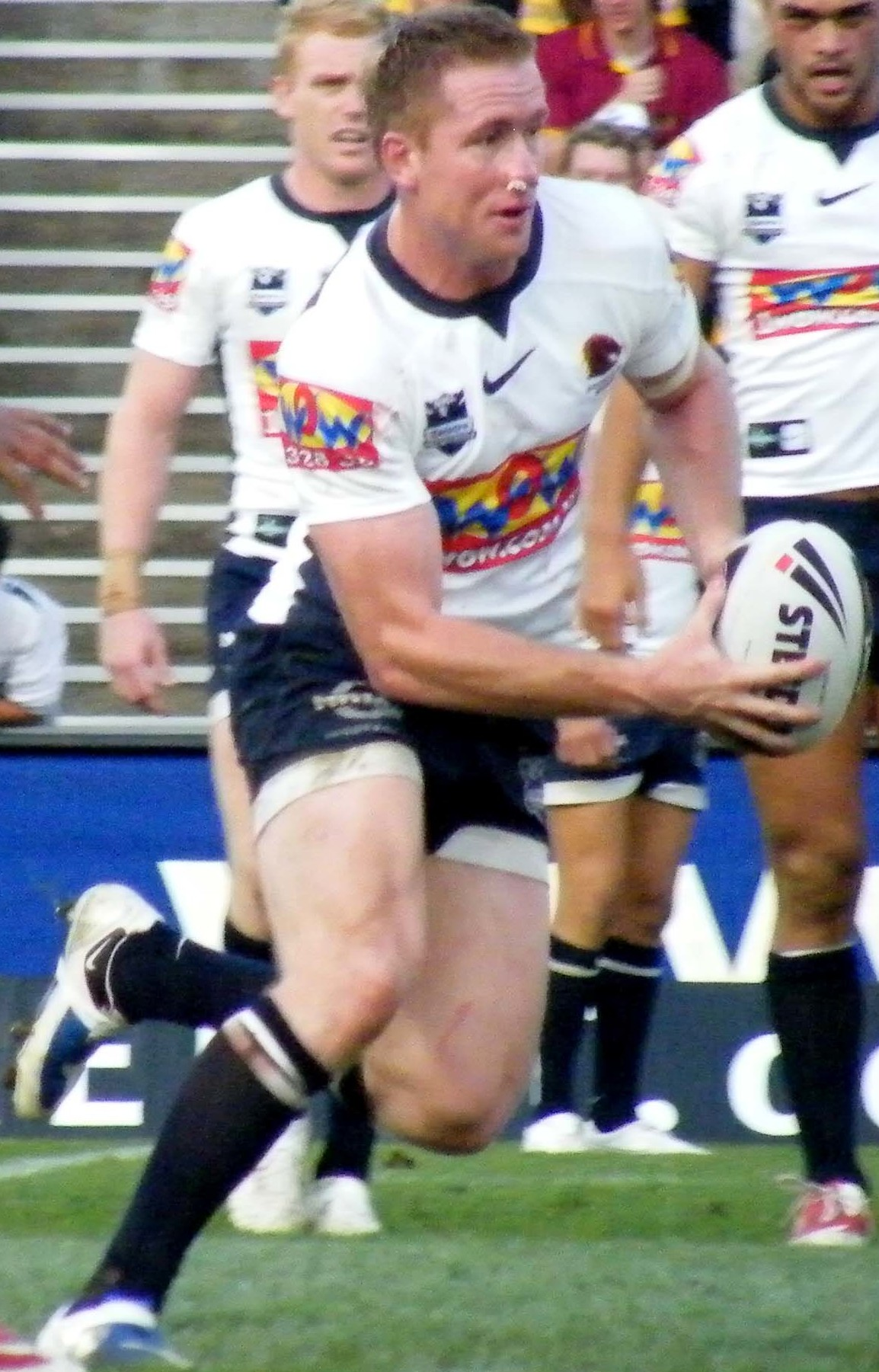

Personal information
- Born: 28 April 1984 (age 42)
- Height: 185 cm (6 ft 1 in)
- Weight: 95 kg (14 st 13 lb)

Playing information
- Position: Second-row, Centre,
Club
Years	Team	Pld	T	G	FG	P
2009	Brisbane Broncos	5	0	0	0	0
2011–13	Toulouse Olympique	37	8	0	0	32
2015–16	Lézignan Sangliers	18	5	0	0	20
	Total	60	13	0	0	52
- Source: As of 9 November 2023

Guy Williams (born 28 April 1984), is an Australian former professional rugby league footballer who last played for the Norths Devils in the Queensland Cup, and previously the Brisbane Broncos in the National Rugby League (NRL) competition. He played as a utility back or in the second row.

== Playing career ==
Williams made his first grade debut for Brisbane in round 15 of the 2009 NRL season against Cronulla which ended in a 46–12 loss. Williams final match for the club was a 34-18 loss against the Gold Coast in round 20. Williams went on to play for the Central Comets in the Queensland Cup.

In 2011, Williams left Central Comets and moved to France where he captained Toulouse Olympique. In 2013 he returned to Central Comets now renamed Central Queensland Capras and went on to captain the side as well as play for them in over 200 games in his two spells. Williams finished his career playing with the Norths Devils for the 2018 season. .

== Post playing ==
Williams previously worked at The Morning Bulletin in Rockhampton as a sports journalist.

Williams was appointed head coach of the Central Queensland Capras in 2021.

Williams took on the role as Male Pathways Coach at the Queensland Rugby League (QRL) in 2022. He oversaw the implementation and development of the Queensland City v Country under-17 boys and Queensland under-19 boys programs, was head coach of the Queensland under-18 boys Emerging Origin squad and assisted Queensland Women’s Head Coach Tahnee Norris during her 2022 Women’s State of Origin campaign.

Williams joined the Manly Warringah Sea Eagles’ for the 2023-2025 National Rugby League seasons as an NRL Assistant Coach. As part of his role, Williams coached Manly Warringah Sea Eagles in The Knock On Effect New South Wales Cup in 2025.
