= Gridiron Queensland =

American Football Queensland
- Most recent season or competition: 2025 Season
- Sport: Gridiron
- Founded: 1985
- No. of teams: Bayside Ravens (SQLD) Brisbane Rhinos (SQLD) Gold Coast Stingrays (SQLD) Logan City Bears (SQLD) Moreton Bay Raptors (SQLD) Townsville Cyclones (NQLD)
- Country: Australia
- Most recent champion: Bayside Ravens (Men's Division) Gold Coast Stingrays (Juniors Division) Bayside Ravens (Women's Division) Brisbane Rhinos (Youth Division)
- Website: gridironqld.asn.au

American Football Queensland is the governing body for gridiron (American football) in the state of Queensland, Australia.

In the end of the season (late November or early December), the Sunbowl takes place where finalists of each division faceoff to win the championship.

After the season, players across the league are selected to form the Queensland Sundevils teams which plays in the National championships. Both the men's and women's Sundevils are current undefeated national champions having won their respective national championships in early 2014.

== Female Gridiron League ==
The Female Gridiron League of Queensland (FGLQ), the first league of its kind in Australia, is a full kit, women's tackle American nine-a-side football competition that commenced on 24 August 2012. The FGLQ was founded by the Logan City Gridiron Football Club and is sanctioned by Gridiron Queensland. Three teams participated in the first season in 2012, the Logan City Jets, Kenmore Panthers and Gold Coast Sea Wolves. The first officially sanctioned game of women's gridiron was played between the Kenmore Panthers and Gold Coast Sea Wolves on 24 August 2012 at Logan Metro Sports, Browns Plains, Queensland. The Logan City Jets defeated the Kenmore Panthers 38-20 in the Summerbowl I championship game played on 2 November 2012. On 23 March 2013 the Female Gridiron League of Queensland Allstars, a team consisting of players who played in the 2012 FGLQ season, toured to Croydon, Melbourne to play the Western Foxes the first women's American Football team in Victoria. The FGLQ Allstars won the game 28-14. Four teams participated in the 2013 FGLQ season which commenced on 6 September 2013; Logan City Jets, Kenmore Panthers, Gold Coast Stingrays (formally Sea Wolves) and new team the Western Jaguars. Following on from the pioneering efforts of the FGLQ other states across Australia established women's gridiron leagues including Gridiron NSW in 2013, Gridiron Victoria in 2013 and ACT Gridiron in 2014.

In 2014 Gridiron Queensland took over the administration of women's gridiron in Queensland. The first ever Women's national championship of American football contested between QLD, NSW and ACT was held in early 2014 and players who played season II of the Female Gridiron League of Queensland (FGLQ) were eligible to be selected for the first ever Queensland SunDevils women's team. The SunDevils were undefeated champions defeating ACT 14-6 in a hard-fought final. Most Valuable Player for the national championship was Queensland player Kristy Moran.

== Men's League members ==
- Bayside Ravens
- Logan City Bears
- Brisbane Rhinos
- Townsville Cyclones

== Women's League members ==
- Logan City Bears
- Moreton Bay Raptors
- Bayside Ravens

== U18's League members ==
- Bayside Ravens
- Logan City Bears
- Brisbane Rhinos
- Gold Coast Stingrays

== Previous Men's Sunbowl champions ==
Sunbowl	Year	Winner	Runner up	Score	Venue
XLII	2026				C. P. Bottomley Park, Norman Park
XLI	2025	Bayside Ravens	Brisbane Rhinos	20-6	Langlands Park
XL	2024	Bayside Ravens	Brisbane Rhinos	41-36	Langlands Park
XXXIX	2023/24	Bayside Ravens	Brisbane Rhinos	20-6	Langlands Park
XXXVIII	2022	Bayside Ravens	Brisbane Rhinos	29-12	W. J. Scott Park, Holland Park
XXXVII	2021	Bayside Ravens	Brisbane Rhinos	59-7	C. P. Bottomley Park, Norman Park
XXXVI	2020	Bayside Ravens	Gold Coast Stingrays	43-18	Sunshine Coast Stadium
XXXV	2019	Bayside Ravens	Brisbane Rhinos	45-44	Kayo Stadium
XXXIV	2018	Griffith University Thunder	Brisbane Rhinos	21-14	Langlands Park
XXXIII	2017	Gold Coast Stingrays	Bayside Ravens	22-21	Langlands Park
XXXII	2016	Gold Coast Stingrays	Northside Rhinos	28-21	Langlands Park
XXXI	2015	Gold Coast Stingrays	Bayside Ravens	63-6	Langlands Park
XXX	2014	Gold Coast Stingrays	Bayside Ravens	23-8	Langlands Park
XXIX	2013	Gold Coast Stingrays	Western Cougars	26-0	Langlands Park
XXVIII	2012	Gold Coast Stingrays	Northside Rhinos	34-16	Langlands Park
XXVII	2011	Gold Coast Stingrays	Northside Rhinos	20-7	Langlands Park
XXVI	2010	Daisy Hill Wildcats (Title Vacated)	Bayside Ravens	29-13	Langlands Park
XXV	2009	Gold Coast Stingrays	Kenmore Bears	35-14	Usher Park, Daisy Hill
XXIV	2008	Gold Coast Stingrays	Northside Rhinos	21-0	C. P. Bottomley Park, Norman Park
XXIII	2007	Gold Coast Stingrays	Browns Plains Bears	21-7	Runaway Bay Sports Super Centre
XXII	2006	Gold Coast Stingrays	Northside Rhinos	27-13	Kougari Oval
XXI	2005	Northside Rhinos	Daisy Hill Wildcats	12-7	Usher Park, Daisy Hill
XX	2004	Ipswich Cougars	Gold Coast Stingrays	21-7	
XIX	2003	Ipswich Cougars	Gold Coast Stingrays	14-0	
XVIII	2002	Ipswich Cougars	Gold Coast Stingrays	14-0	
XVII	2001	Gold Coast Stingrays	Ipswich Cougars	12-7	
XVI	2000	Ipswich Cougars	Gold Coast Stingrays	10-7	
XV	1999	Gold Coast Stingrays	Ipswich Cougars	20-18	
XIV	1998	Ipswich Cougars	Rebels	12-7	
XIII	1997	Ipswich Cougars	Toowoomba Chargers	32-6	
XII	1996	Toowoomba Chargers	Pine Rivers Pirates	47-20	
XI	1995	Gold Coast Stingrays	Toowoomba Chargers	6-0	
X	1994	Gold Coast Stingrays	Westside Centurians	12-0	
IX	1993	Brisbane Bulldogs	Gold Coast Stingrays	12-6	
VIII	1992	Brisbane Bulldogs	Logan City Tigers	17-6	
VII	1991	Logan City Tigers	Wang Warriors	N/A	
VI	1990	Wang Warriors	Westside Centurians	40-34	
V	1989	Brisbane Bulldogs	Westside Centurians	7-6	
IV	1988	Westside Centurians	Brisbane Bulldogs	16-13	
III	1987	Brisbane Bulldogs	Pine Grove Steelers	22-6	
II	1986	Brisbane Bulldogs	Pine Grove Steelers	41-26	
I	1985	Brisbane Bulldogs	Mitchelton Warriors	7-2	

== Previous Summerbowl champions ==
Summerbowl	Year	Champions	Runners-up	Score
III	2014	Logan City Jets	Gold Coast Stingrays	6-0
II	2013	Gold Coast Stingrays	Logan City Jets	12-8
I	2012	Logan City Jets	Kenmore Panthers	38-20

Previous Youth Sunbowl Champions

Summerbowl	Year	Champions	Runners-up	Score
II	2025	Brisbane Rhinos	Bayside Ravens	24-20
I	2024	Gold Coast Stingrays Blue	Gold Coast Stingrays Navy	60-28

== Female League Records ==
Most Touchdowns in a Game - four (4) - Hayley Peterson (Logan City Jets) against Gold Coast Sea Wolves, 31 August 2013. Kristy Moran (Logan City Jets) two times against Western Jaguars, 8 November 2013 and 15 November 2013.

  - New League Record **

"Most Touch Downs in a Game" - six (6) - Kristy Moran (Logan City Jets) against Logan City Steelers. On 3 August 2014. Kristy Moran scored six touch downs from seven (7) carriers.

  - League Equalling Record **

"Most Touchdowns in a Game" - six (6) - Sienna Turnbull (Bayside Ravens) against Moreton Bay Raptors, 8 Nov 2025. Sienna's touchdowns came from receiving, rushing, and defensive take aways.

Youth League Records

Most Passing TDS - (16*) Kane Buchanan (Gold Coast Stingrays)

Most Rushing TDS - (18*) Finch Watkins (Moreton Bay Raptors)

Highest Scoring Regular Season Game - Moreton Bay Raptors 74-58 Logan City Bears (2026)

Lowest Scoring Regular Season Game -Bayside Ravens 10-6 Logan City Bears (2024)

== See also ==
- Gridiron Australia
