= Lionel Harbin =

Australian RL coach & former professional rugby league footballer

Personal information
- Full name: Lionel Harbin
- Born: 3 October 1976 (age 50) Australia

Playing information
- Position: Hooker
Club
Years	Team	Pld	T	G	FG	P
2001	Wakefield Trinity Wildcats	1	0	0	0	0

Coaching information
Representative
Years	Team	Gms	W	D	L	W%
2018–	Vanuatu

Lionel Harbin (3 October 1976) is an Australian professional rugby league coach who is the head coach of the Central Queensland Capras in the Queensland Cup and a former professional rugby league footballer who played in the 2000s, and has coached in the 2010s.

He played at club level for Canberra Raiders (junior), and Wakefield Trinity Wildcats, under head-coach, and father John Harbin, as a hooker, and has coached at representative level for Vanuatu, and at club level for Wakefield Trinity Wildcats (academy coach).

He was a highly rated hooker, however he made only one appearance for the Wakefield Trinity Wildcats in 2001's Super League VI against Huddersfield Giants due to re-occurring injuries.

In the 2010s, Harbin became heavily involved with Rockhampton-based QRL club the Central Queensland Capras as both a player and a coach. Harbin stepped in as an interim head coach of the team following the sudden resignation of Jason Hetherington two months into the 2015 season.

In 2021, he was named as head coach for the Capras to take over from Guy Williams for the 2022 season. As head coach, Harbin successfully led the Capras to the 2022 finals series, the first time the team had reached the finals since 2009 when they were known as the Central Comets.
