= Central Queensland Capras =

Australian rugby league club, based in Rockhampton, QLD

Club information
- Full name: Central Queensland Capras; Rugby League Football Club
- Nickname: Capras
- Colours: Blue; Maroon; White
- Founded: 1982; 44 years ago

Current details
- Ground: Browne Park (5,500)
- CEO: Peter White
- Coach: Lionel Harbin
- Captain: Blake Moore & Tyler Szepanowski
- Competition: Queensland Cup
- 2024 season: 6th

Records
- Premierships (2nd grade): None
- Runners-up (2nd grade): None
- Wooden spoons (2nd grade): 6 (2005, 2007, 2015, 2017, 2019, 2021)
- Most capped: 238 – Guy Williams
- Highest points scorer: 542 – Nat Bowman

The Central Queensland Capras are a semi-professional rugby league football club primarily based in Rockhampton, Queensland and representing Central Queensland. They play in the Queensland Cup, which is a second-tier competition in Australia. Since 2023, they are one of the feeder clubs for the Dolphins in the Australian National Rugby League.

The club was founded in 1982 under the name Central Capras but changed to the Central Comets in 2000 and renamed the Central Queensland Capras in 2011.

== History ==
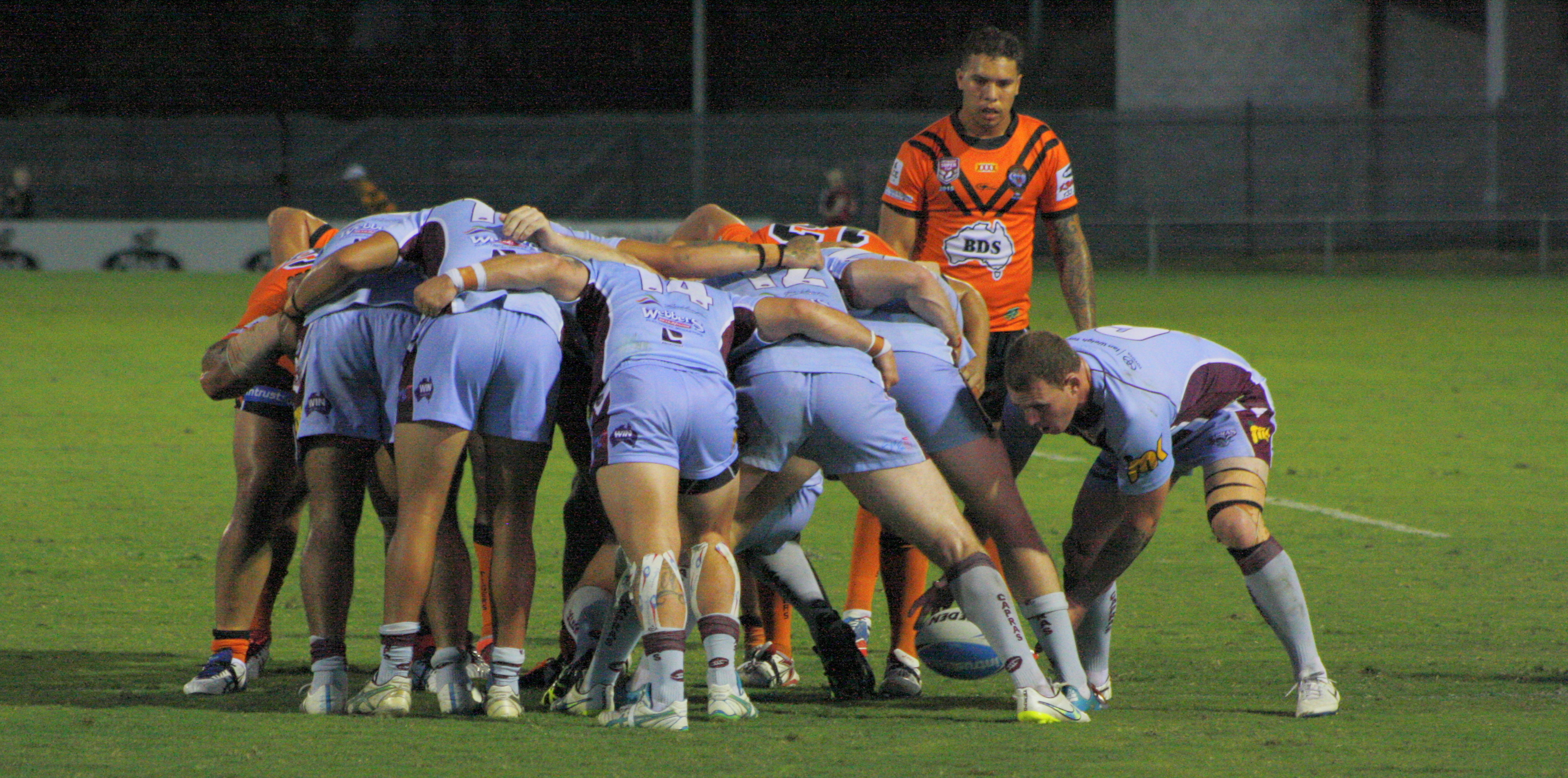
Scrum. Easts vs Capras. Intrust Super Cup. Langlands Park, 18 April 2015

In the 1980s, the Central Queensland Capras had entered a team in the Queensland Winfield State League Competition. Their colours at that time were sky blue and maroon. In 1996 the Queensland Rugby League Central Division entered a representative team, the Central Capras in the inaugural Queensland Cup competition. The costs were too expensive for the Central Division to maintain, and in October 1998 it was decided that a private club should be entered into the Queensland Cup. Although this team was known as the Central Capras in 1999, it was decided to rename the team to the Central Comets to avoid confusion with the Capras representative teams.

For the 1999 season, the Capras Rugby League Football Club was formed, which relieved the Central Division of the cost, providing more funds to the Central Division to develop and maintain Rugby League in Central Queensland.

In 2000, the Capras team that participated in the Queensland Cup changed their name to the Comets Rugby League Football Club. With a new name and fresh look, the Comets represented the top level of football in Central Queensland for six years.

In 2002 the Comets formed an alignment with NRL team North Queensland Cowboys. This close alignment provided opportunities for development of the Comets Rugby League Football Club, as well as providing opportunities and pathways for players to the NRL.

In late 2007, the Comets ceased their alignment with the Cowboys and formed an alignment with the Brisbane Broncos. The arrangement with the Broncos saw NRL-contracted players that are not named in the weekly Broncos side return to their home region and play for the Comets. Dave Taylor, PJ Marsh, Tommy Hewitt, Ben Hunt and Guy Williams all played for the Comets while being contracted to the Broncos.

The alignment with the Broncos also allowed Comets players to experience what it is like to train in a NRL environment. Through this arrangement, Aaron Summers, Jade Williams, Ty Haynes and Ian Webster got the opportunity to develop their skills under Broncos coach Ivan Henjak by training with the Broncos once a week during the 2010 preseason.

2009 was a particularly successful season for the Central Comets. During the season, the Comets side set a club record winning 10 matches in a row during the season and made the finals for the first time. The Comets finished the season in third place after beating eventual winners the Sunshine Coast Sea Eagles in the first semi-final but losing out to the Northern Pride in the major semi-final.

Following the completion of the 2011 Intrust Super Cup the club entered into a rebuilding phase with a new executive committee taking control led by local business Steve McCosker. Approached by club stakeholders, McCosker replaced Scott Chapman as chairman of the executive committee. The Comets hit financial problems during 2011 with the club struggling to pay players wages but following a pitch from Comets officials the Rockhampton Leagues Club agreed to provide additional funds on top of the $200,000 they already provide through sponsorship to the Comets. Motivated by the rich history of Central Queensland rugby league the new committee reverted the name of the club back to the Central Queensland Capras. The Capras is still the name used for all Representative sides from Central Queensland and according to Chairman Steve McCosker "The Capra symbolises Central Queensland and much of (the sport's) history".

After finishing last in four of the next nine seasons – including the incompleted 2020 season, cancelled due to the COVID-19 pandemic, the Capras returned to the finals of the Queensland Cup in 2022, winning an elimination final against the Northern Pride at Browne Park. They were eliminated in the semi-final stage, two weeks short of the grand final, losing to the Burleigh Bears.

=== QRLW team ===
In 2019, it was announced that a women's Central Queensland Capras team would enter the inaugural QRL Women's Premiership competition in 2020, known as the BHP Premiership. The season was scheduled to consist of eight rounds, with eight clubs competing including six existing South East Queensland Division 1 teams in addition to the new entries of the Central Queensland Capras and the North Queensland Gold Stars.

Coached by Amanda Ohl, the Capras' first trial game was held on 15 February 2020 at Browne Park against Souths Logan Magpies, where they were defeated, 16–4. In the opening round of the 2020 QRLW competition, the Capras defeated the Brisbane Tigers, 14–6, at Langlands Park in Brisbane on 15 March 2020. However, due to the COVID-19 pandemic, the remaining rounds were cancelled.

In 2021, the Capras played their first game of the new seven-round QRLW season at Frank Lind Oval in Brisbane on 10 April 2021 where they beat the Wests Panthers, 26–16. They lost their next five games and failed to make the finals, but they finished the season with a 56–6 win against the Valkyries at Browne Park on 23 May 2021.

The 2022 season proved to be particularly successful for the Capras, finishing minor premiers and qualifying for their first grand final. The game, played at Moreton Daily Stadium in Redcliffe, resulted in a 12–14 loss to the North Queensland Gold Stars, who scored the winning try in the final minute of the game.

Although the side is based in Rockhampton, many of the players travel long distances from around the state for their home games at Browne Park.

== Records ==
Most Games for Club

- 238, Guy Williams
- 150, Heath Egglestone
- 136, Dallas Williams
- 128, Gavin Hiscox
- 127, Mick Esdale

Most Points for Club

- 542, Nat Bowman
- 398, Heath Egglestone
- 383, Graham White
- 259, Ian Webster
- 214, Jade Wogland

Most Tries for Club

- 99, Heath Egglestone
- 49, Wade Rothery
- 40, Nat Bowman
- 39, Justin Loomans
- 33, Graham White, Dallas Williams

== Seasons ==
Central Queensland Capras
Year	Pld	W	D	L	PF	PA	Pos	Playoffs / Notes
1996	15	7	0	8	309	336	11/16	
1997	18	10	2	6	455	398	6/14	Semi finalists (L 10–38 v Wests Panthers)
1998	22	8	0	14	497	701	11/16	
1999	22	4	0	18	440	626	11/12	
2000	22	10	1	11	529	550	8/12	
2001	20	7	3	10	468	517	7/11	
2002	22	4	1	17	434	814	9/12	
2003	22	7	0	15	466	749	10/12	
2004	22	8	0	14	566	705	9/12	
2005	20	1	2	17	346	829	11/11	
2006	20	7	1	12	409	560	8/11	
2007	20	2	0	18	310	666	11/11	
2008	20	7	0	13	404	595	10/11	
2009	22	13	0	9	508	499	3/12	Preliminary finalists (W 21–14 v Sunshine Coast, L 10–22 v Northern Pride)
2010	22	6	0	16	415	624	10/12	
2011	22	7	0	15	425	634	11/12	
2012	22	6	0	16	432	743	10/12	Club renamed Central Queensland Capras
2013	22	7	1	14	462	569	10/12	
2014	24	3	2	19	321	557	12/13	
2015	23	1	0	22	324	866	14/14	
2016	23	7	0	16	436	756	12/14	
2017	23	4	1	18	412	685	13/14	
2018	23	7	0	16	390	576	13/14	
2019	23	1	1	21	318	820	14/14	
2020	1	0	0	1	4	44	14/14	Season cancelled on 27 March due to 2019–20 Coronavirus Pandemic
2021	17	1	2	14	303	503	14/14	
2022	19	11	1	7	472	394	5/14	Semi finalists (W 30–22 v Northern Pride, L 16–32 v Burleigh Bears)
2023	22	12	2	6	511	387	4/14	Preliminary Finalists (L 14–6 Brisbane Tigers)
2024	20	10	2	8	474	452	6/15	Semi finalists (L 32–24 Burleigh Bears)

== See also ==
- National Rugby League reserves affiliations
