= Langlands Park =

Sporting venue in Australia

Langlands Park Totally Workwear Stadium
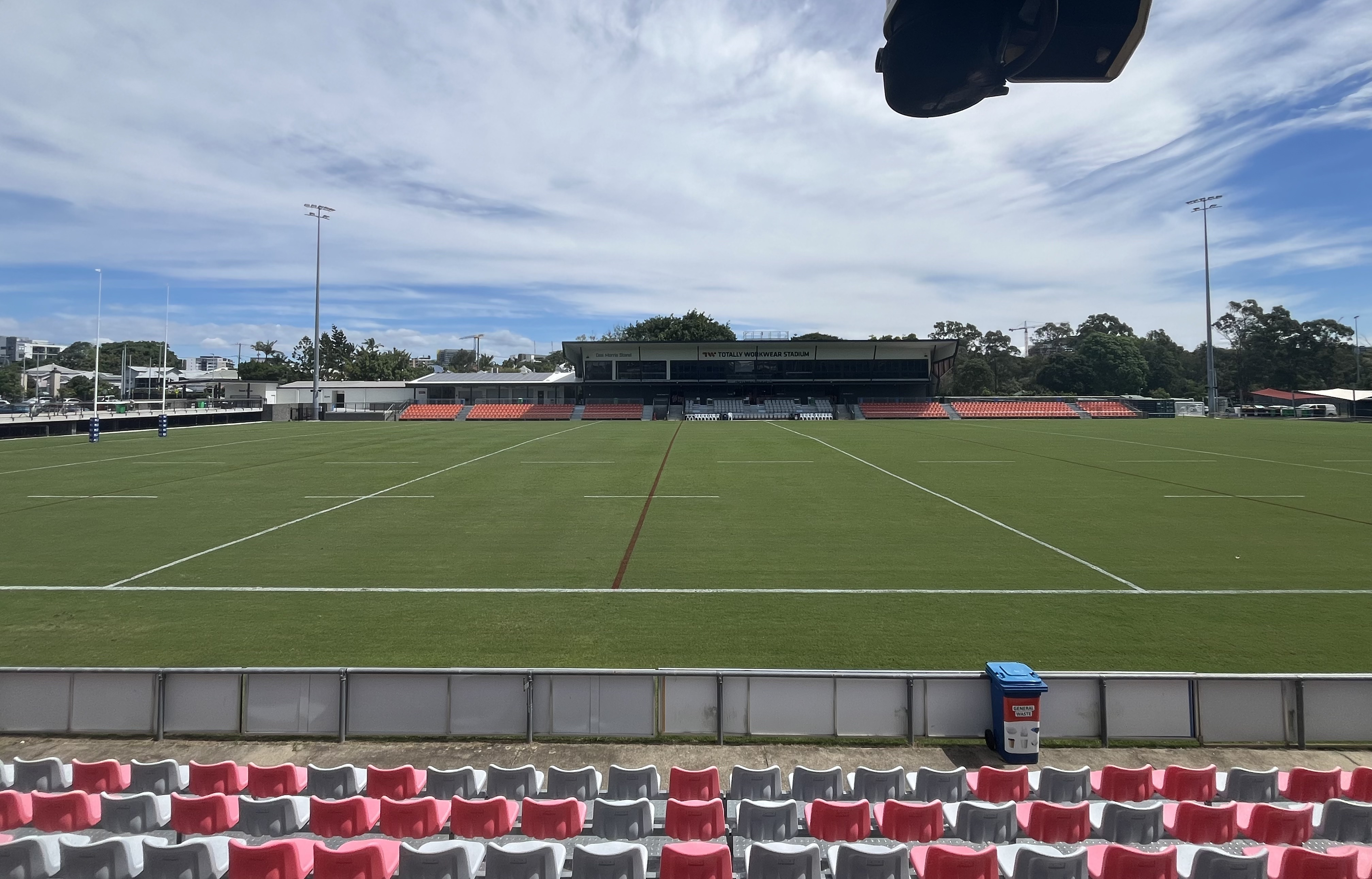
- Interactive map of Langlands Park; Totally Workwear Stadium
- Location: Stones Corner, Queensland
- Capacity: 3,500

Construction
- Renovated: 2023

Tenants
- Brisbane Tigers; Brisbane Broncos (NRLW)

Langlands Park (also known as Totally Workwear Stadium under naming rights) is a sporting venue in the suburb of Stones Corner, in Brisbane, Queensland, Australia. It is the home ground of the Brisbane Tigers, a rugby league team that competes in the Queensland Cup and is also used as a home ground for the Brisbane Broncos Women's side in the National Rugby League Women's competition.

== History ==
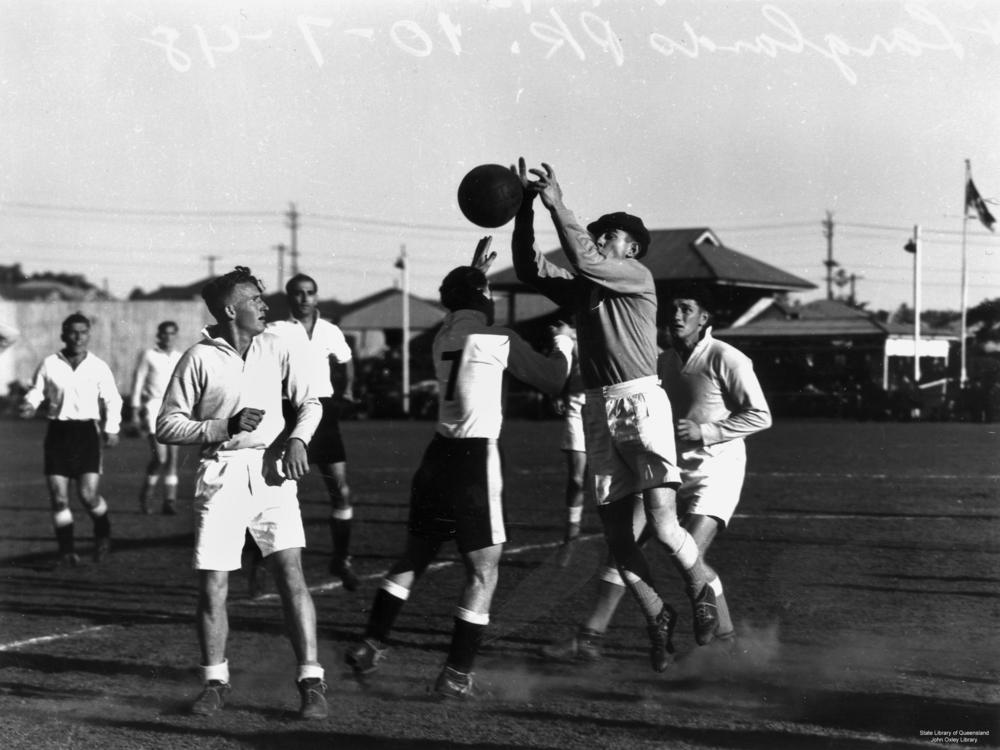
Soccer game at Langlands Park, 1948

Langlands Park is named for Langlands, which was the name of the residence that previously existed on the property (owned by merchant Reuben Nicklin). When the property was subdivided, it was in part retained as a sporting reserve. This became the home of the Eastern Suburbs Cricket club, and was large enough to house two cricket fields. This was reduced to one cricket field when the cricket club moved to a new ground, and it is now home to the Brisbane Tigers (previously known as the Easts Leagues club and the Easts Tigers). In 1999 the Easts Leagues club was built, as was a grandstand along the western side of the field. The ground capacity is now 3,500.

== Amenities ==
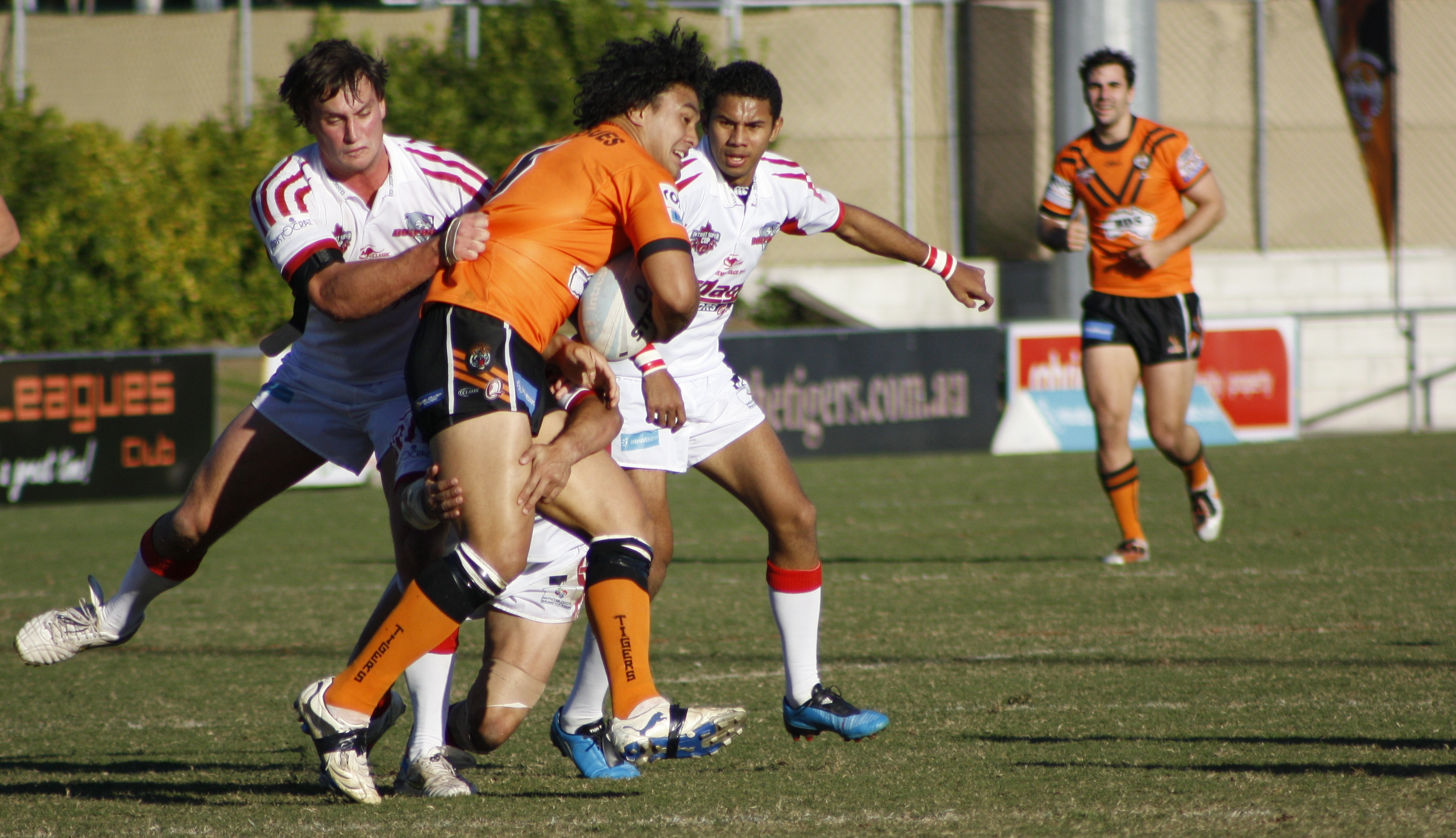
Rugby League match between home team Easts and the Redcliffe Dolphins, 2011

Langlands Park has a swimming pool, the Langlands Park Memorial Pool, sports fields, a wood-fired barbecue, a fitness station (near Panitya Street), a picnic area (near Panitya Street), a playground (near Panitya Street), and a cycling/walking path.

== Events ==
In addition to being the home ground for the Easts Tigers, Langlands Park has also hosted:

- City-Country representative rugby league matches
- The 2005 Rugby League Student World Cup final
- Brisbane Broncos NRLW home matches since 2023
- Gridiron Queensland's 'Sunbowl' State Championship Game

The largest crowd at Langlands Park was just over 8,000 for a game between Wests and Easts in 1977, however 5,000 people attended the ground on 11 September 2004 to watch Easts defeat the Wynnum-Manly Seagulls to make the 2004 Queensland Cup Grand Final.

== Redevelopment in 2022 ==
In 2022 the venue underwent a $10.1 million redevelopment. The new venue, has a seating capacity of 4,000, and improved facilities.
