= 2008 Brisbane Broncos season =

NRL rugby league season

Coordinates: 27°27′53″S 153°0′34″E

- NRL rank: 5th
- Play-off result: Lost Semi Final, (Melbourne Storm, 14–16)
- 2008 record: Wins: 14; draws: 1; losses: 9
- Points scored: For: 560; against: 452

Team information
- Managing Director: Bruno Cullen
- Director of Coaching: Wayne Bennett
- Captains: Darren Lockyer; Justin Hodges; Sam Thaiday; Corey Parker
- Stadium: Suncorp Stadium
- Avg. attendance: 33,426
- Agg. attendance: 401,108
- High attendance: 50,612 (North Queensland Cowboys, 28 March)
- Low attendance: 27,469 (Manly Warringah Sea Eagles, 11 May)

Top scorers
- Tries: Denan Kemp (19)
- Goals: Michael Ennis (50)
- Points: Michael Ennis (128)
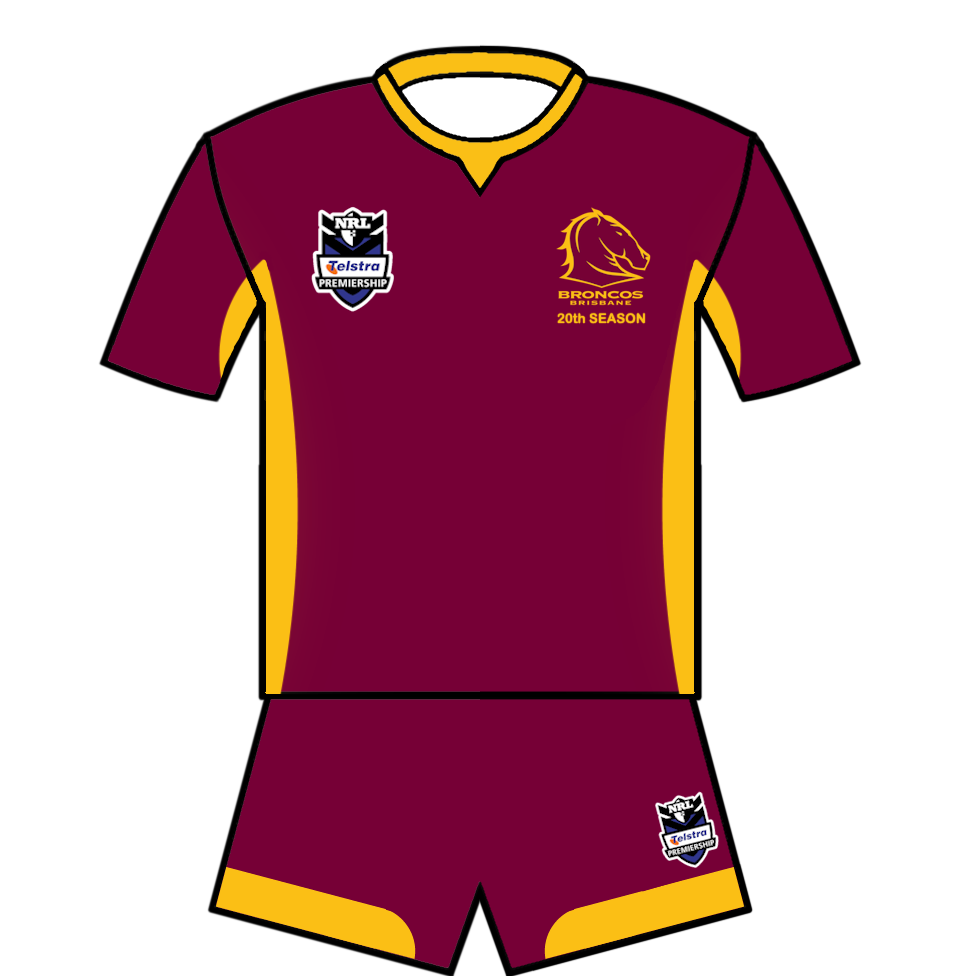
Home colours
← 2007	List of seasons	2009 →

The 2008 Brisbane Broncos season was the 21st in the club's history. They competed in the NRL's 2008 Telstra Premiership, the centenary season of rugby league football in Australia. The Broncos finished the regular season 5th (out of 16), but were knocked out of the finals by eventual grand finalists Melbourne Storm for the second consecutive year.

== Season summary ==
The Broncos started the season by winning their first three games: 48–12 against the Penrith Panthers in round 1, 20–14 against the Sydney Roosters in round 2 and 36–2 against the North Queensland Cowboys in round 3. Round 3 gave way to an attendance of 50,612 people, the biggest crowd at Suncorp Stadium. The Broncos suffered their first loss of the 2008 season with a 28–8 loss to reigning premiers the Melbourne Storm in round 4.

Round 5 saw the Broncos have a 34–22 win over the Newcastle Knights at Energy Australia Stadium. Justin Hodges starred with a two try effort, with Michael Ennis also scoring two tries, while always looking dangerous. Round 6 was a disappointing 26–24 loss for the Broncos to the red hot Gold Coast Titans. The Titans burst out of the blocks with a 16–0 lead after 20 mins. However, the Broncos fought back, with a missed goal from the sideline from Michael Ennis late in the second half the difference. In round 9, the Broncos lost their first match of the season; though they led 12–6 at halftime, they lost 30–12 against the Manly Sea Eagles. This was the Broncos' first loss for the season at Suncorp Stadium. In round 10, the Broncos had their first back-to-back losses for the season, when they lost to the Cronulla-Sutherland Sharks 13–6 at Toyota Park. The Broncos returned to the winners' list with a thrilling 30–26 win against the Parramatta Eels at Suncorp Stadium in round 12. Denan Kemp equalled the record for the most tries in a match for the Broncos, with four tries against the Eels in round 12. Karmichael Hunt kicked his first ever field goal when he won the game for the Broncos 19–18 against the Wests Tigers in round 15. Nick Kenny scored his first ever try in first grade against the Tigers. The Broncos played out their first draw since round 25, 2004, and the first draw of the season, with a hard-fought 12–12 draw with the Penrith Panthers at CUA Stadium in round 16. In round 20, the Broncos had their first back-to-back wins since round 8 with a hard-fought 18–12 win over the Cronulla Sharks at Suncorp Stadium. Joel Clinton scored his first try for the Broncos in their 25–21 win over the Gold Coast Titans at Suncorp Stadium in round 24. In round 25, the Broncos secured another finals campaign with a 36–22 win over the Canterbury Bulldogs at Suncorp Stadium. The Broncos would compete in their 17th straight finals series. They took on the Sydney Roosters in the qualifying final, and turned an 8-point halftime deficit into an 8-point win, coming from 16–8 down to win 24–16 at the SFS. The Broncos' season came to an end when Greg Inglis crossed the line with one minute to play as the Broncos led the Melbourne Storm 14–12 in the semi-final at Suncorp Stadium. They lost 16–14.

After the NRL season, Brisbane's Darius Boyd was selected to make his international debut for Australia in the 2008 Rugby League World Cup.

== Squad information ==
As of 20 September 2008

Cap.	Nat.	Player	Position	First Broncos game	Previous First Grade RL club
76	(Australia)	Darren Lockyer (c)	Five-eighth	1995	—N/a
79	(Australia)	Tonie Carroll	Lock	1996	—N/a
100	(Australia)	Justin Hodges	Centre	2000	—N/a
106	(Australia)	Corey Parker	Second-row	2001	—N/a
124	(Australia)	Craig Frawley	Wing	2003	(Australia) Canberra Raiders
127	(Australia)	David Stagg	Second-row	2003	—N/a
128	(Australia)	Sam Thaiday	Second-row	2003	—N/a
130	(Australia)	Karmichael Hunt	Fullback	2004	—N/a
138	(Australia)	Steve Michaels	Wing	2005	—N/a
139	(Australia)	Nick Kenny	Prop	2005	—N/a
140	(New Zealand)	Greg Eastwood	Lock	2005	—N/a
141	(Australia)	Darius Boyd	Centre	2006	—N/a
142	(Australia)	Shane Perry	Halfback	2006	(Australia) Canterbury-Bankstown Bulldogs
143	(Australia)	Michael Ennis	Hooker	2006	(Australia) St. George Illawarra Dragons
144	(Australia)	Ben Hannant	Prop	2006	(Australia) Sydney Roosters
147	(Australia)	Joel Moon	Centre	2006	—N/a
148	(Australia)	Dave Taylor	Prop	2006	—N/a
149	(Australia)	Nick Emmett	Centre	2006	—N/a
153	(Australia)	Denan Kemp	Wing	2007	—N/a
154	(Australia)	Mick Roberts	Hooker	2007	—N/a
157	(Australia)	Reece Robinson	Wing	2008	—N/a
158	(Australia)	Peter Wallace	Halfback	2008	(Australia) Penrith Panthers
159	(Australia)	Joel Clinton	Prop	2008	(Australia) Penrith Panthers
160	(Fiji)	Ashton Sims	Second-row	2008	(Australia) St. George Illawarra Dragons
161	(Australia)	PJ Marsh	Hooker	2008	(Australia) Parramatta Eels
162	(Australia)	Derrick Watkins	Second-row	2008	(Australia) North Queensland Cowboys
163	(Australia)	Andrew McCullough	Hooker	2008	—N/a
164	(Samoa)	Isaak Ah Mau	Prop	2008	—N/a
165	(New Zealand)	Josh Hoffman	Fullback	2008	—N/a
166	(New Zealand)	Kaine Manihera	Wing	2008	—N/a
—	(Australia)	Ryan Barton	Second-row	Yet to debut	—N/a
—	(Australia)	Gerard Beale	Centre	Yet to debut	—N/a
—	(Australia)	Rodney Davies	Wing	Yet to debut	—N/a
—	(Australia)	Tom Hewitt	Wing	Yet to debut	(Australia) St. George Illawarra Dragons
—	(Australia)	Jason Moon	Centre	Yet to debut	—N/a
—	(Australia)	Palmer Wapau	Second-row	Yet to debut	—N/a

== Squad changes ==
=== Transfers in ===
Date	Pos.	Player	From	Year/s	Ref.
—	Halfback	Peter Wallace	Penrith Panthers	2 years	
—	Prop	Joel Clinton	Penrith Panthers	3 years	
23 June 2007	Second-row	Ashton Sims	St. George Illawarra Dragons	3 years	
10 August 2007	Wing	Tom Hewitt	St. George Illawarra Dragons	2 years	
2 November 2007	Hooker	PJ Marsh	Parramatta Eels	3 years	

=== Transfers out ===
Date	Pos.	Player	To	Year/s	Ref.
30 May 2007	Centre	Brent Tate	New Zealand Warriors	3 years	
15 June 2007	Hooker	Shaun Berrigan	Hull F.C.	4 years	
28 June 2007	Prop	Petero Civoniceva	Penrith Panthers	2 years	
7 July 2007	Prop	Dane Carlaw	Catalans Dragons	3 years	
23 August 2007	Second-row	Brad Thorn	Crusaders (rugby union)	1 year	

=== Re-signings ===
Date	Pos.	Player	Year/s	Ref.
22 January 2008	Prop	Dave Taylor	1 year	
26 March 2008	Second-row	Corey Parker	3 years	
15 July 2008	Halfback	Peter Wallace	3 years	
15 July 2008	Wing	Steve Michaels	2 years	
15 July 2008	Wing	Gerard Beale	2 years	
15 July 2008	Fullback	Josh Hoffman	2 years	
15 July 2008	Halfback	Ben Hunt	2 years	
15 July 2008	Hooker	Andrew McCullough	2 years	
15 July 2008	Prop	Josh McGuire	2 years	
15 July 2008	Wing	Will Tupou	2 years	
15 July 2008	Wing	Jharal Yow Yeh	2 years	

=== Contracts ===
Current	Signed for				Source
2008	2009	2010	2011	2012	Source
Darius Boyd	signed with St. George Illawarra			off contract	
Tonie Carroll	.				
Joel Clinton			off contract		
Greg Eastwood	signed with Bulldogs			off contract	
Nick Emmett	signed with St. George Illawarra	contract details unknown			
Michael Ennis	signed with Bulldogs			off contract	
leaving Melbourne	Israel Folau				
leaving Catalans	Aaron Gorrell				
Ben Hannant	signed with Bulldogs			off contract	
Justin Hodges				off contract	
Karmichael Hunt		Signed with Gold Coast AfL			
Denan Kemp	signed with New Zealand		off contract		
Nick Kenny			off contract		
Kaine Manihera	contract details unknown				
Darren Lockyer		off contract			
PJ Marsh			off contract		
Steven Michaels			off contract		
Joel Moon	signed with New Zealand			off contract	
Corey Parker				off contract	
Shane Perry	signed with Catalans	off contract			
Reece Robinson	off contract				
leaving St. George Illawarra	Lagi Setu	off contract			
Ashton Sims			off contract		
David Stagg	signed with Canterbury		off contract		
David Taylor		off contract			
leaving Wests Tigers	Ben Te'o	off contract			
Sam Thaiday		off contract			
Peter Wallace					

== Coaching staff ==
Name	Role	Ref.
Wayne Bennett	Director of coaching	
Ivan Henjak	Assistant coach	
Peter Ryan	Defence co-ordinator	
Paul Green	Kicking & catching co-ordinator	
Jeremy Hickmans	Performance director	
Paul Bunn	Special projects/recruitment manager	
Peter Nolan	Football/team manager	
Andrew Gee	Sponsorship manager	
Dan Baker	Strength coach	
Rob Godbolt	Physiotherapist & rehab co-ordinator	
Allan Langer	Backs co-ordinator	
Ben Ikin	Team welfare officer	
Tony Spencer	Trainer	
Ken Rach	Trainer	
Scott Barker	Video analysis	
Anthony Griffin	NYC coach/elite player development manager	

== Matches ==
Round	Opponent	Result	Bris.	Opp.	Date	Venue	Crowd	Position
Trial	Central Comets	Win	30	12	9 February	Theodore, Queensland		
Trial	North Queensland Cowboys	Win	20	10	16 February	Brown Park, Rockhampton		
Trial	Canberra Raiders	Loss	16	32	23 February	Wade Park, Orange	8,500	
Trial	Redcliffe Dolphins	Win	24	22	1 March	Dolphin Oval, Redcliffe	8,000	
1	Penrith Panthers	Win	48	12	16 March	Suncorp Stadium	31,250	1/16
2	Sydney Roosters	Win	20	14	21 March	Sydney Football Stadium	18,724	1/16
3	North Queensland Cowboys	Win	36	2	28 March	Suncorp Stadium	50,612	1/16
4	Melbourne Storm	Loss	8	28	4 April	Olympic Park Stadium	13,831	1/16
5	Newcastle Knights	Win	34	22	13 April	EnergyAustralia Stadium	21,614	1/16
6	Gold Coast Titans	Loss	24	26	18 April	Skilled Park	27,176	2/16
7	South Sydney Rabbitohs	Win	32	18	25 April	Suncorp Stadium	34,112	2/16
8	Wests Tigers	Win	34	22	3 May	ANZ Stadium	11,177	1/16
9	Manly-Warringah Sea Eagles	Loss	12	30	11 May	Suncorp Stadium	27,469	3/16
10	Cronulla-Sutherland Sharks	Loss	6	13	17 May	Toyota Park	13,431	6/16
11	Bye							5/16
12	Parramatta Eels	Win	30	26	30 May	Suncorp Stadium	25,564	4/16
13	St. George Illawarra Dragons	Loss	10	28	6 June	WIN Stadium	11,432	6/16
14	Canberra Raiders	Loss	16	34	15 June	Canberra Stadium	11,157	7/16
15	Wests Tigers	Win	19	18	20 June	Suncorp Stadium	27,862	7/16
16	Penrith Panthers	Draw	12	12	27 June	CUA Stadium	9,967	7/16
17	Bye							7/16
18	Bulldogs	Loss	18	26	13 July	Suncorp Stadium	37,687	7/16
19	North Queensland Cowboys	Win	32	18	18 July	Dairy Farmers Stadium	22,048	5/16
20	Cronulla-Sutherland Sharks	Win	18	12	25 July	Suncorp Stadium	27,905	5/16
21	Canberra Raiders	Win	34	6	3 August	Suncorp Stadium	28,103	5/16
22	New Zealand Warriors	Loss	12	16	9 August	Mt. Smart	13,007	5/16
23	St. George Illawarra Dragons	Loss	20	24	15 August	Suncorp Stadium	33,237	5/16
24	Gold Coast Titans	Win	25	21	22 August	Suncorp Stadium	39,737	5/16
25	Bulldogs	Win	36	22	31 August	Stadium Australia	7,685	5/16
26	Newcastle Knights	Win	24	2	5 September	Suncorp Stadium	37,552	5/16
QF	Sydney Roosters	Win	24	16	12 September	Sydney Football Stadium	18,343	
SF	Melbourne Storm	Loss	14	16	20 September	Suncorp Stadium	50,466	

=== Ladder ===
2008 NRL season
Pos	Team	Pld	W	D	L	B	PF	PA	PD	Pts
1	Melbourne Storm	24	17	0	7	2	584	282	+302	38
2	Manly Warringah Sea Eagles (P)	24	17	0	7	2	645	355	+290	38
3	Cronulla-Sutherland Sharks	24	17	0	7	2	451	384	+67	38
4	Sydney Roosters	24	15	0	9	2	511	446	+65	34
5	Brisbane Broncos	24	14	1	9	2	560	452	+108	33
6	Canberra Raiders	24	13	0	11	2	640	527	+113	30
7	St George Illawarra Dragons	24	13	0	11	2	489	378	+111	30
8	New Zealand Warriors	24	13	0	11	2	502	567	-65	30
9	Newcastle Knights	24	12	0	12	2	516	486	+30	28
10	Wests Tigers	24	11	0	13	2	528	560	-32	26
11	Parramatta Eels	24	11	0	13	2	501	547	-46	26
12	Penrith Panthers	24	10	1	13	2	504	611	-107	25
13	Gold Coast Titans	24	10	0	14	2	476	586	-110	24
14	South Sydney Rabbitohs	24	8	0	16	2	453	666	-213	20
15	North Queensland Cowboys	24	5	0	19	2	474	638	-164	14
16	Canterbury-Bankstown Bulldogs	24	5	0	19	2	433	782	-349	14

== Statistics ==
Player	Tries	Goals	Field goals	Points
Michael Ennis	7	48	0	124
Denan Kemp	17	0	0	68
Corey Parker	3	27	0	66
Darius Boyd	9	0	0	36
Justin Hodges	8	0	0	32
Sam Thaiday	8	0	0	32
Peter Wallace	4	8	0	28
Joel Moon	5	0	0	20
Reece Robinson	4	0	0	16
David Stagg	4	0	0	16
Karmichael Hunt	3	0	1	13
Darren Lockyer	2	0	1	9
Tonie Carroll	2	0	0	8
Ben Hannant	2	0	0	8
Kaine Manihera	2	0	0	8
Greg Eastwood	2	0	0	8
PJ Marsh	1	0	0	4
Reece Robinson	1	0	0	4
Steve Michaels	1	0	0	4
Shane Perry	1	0	0	4
Nick Kenny	1	0	0	4
Dave Taylor	1	0	0	4
Joel Clinton	1	0	0	4

== Honours ==
=== League ===
- Nil

=== Club ===
- Player of the year: Sam Thaiday
- Rookie of the year: Denan Kemp
- Back of the year: Karmichael Hunt
- Forward of the year: Sam Thaiday
- Club man of the year: Matt Middleton

== NRL Under-20s ==
For the first time since the formation of the NRL in 1998, every team fielded a team in the same second-tier competition the NRL Under-20s, guaranteeing fans a high standard curtain raiser before every NRL game. The National Youth Competition (known commercially as the Toyota Cup due to sponsorship from Toyota Australia) ran parallel to the NRL. Similar to the NRL, the NYC enforces a salary cap and puts a heavy focus on life outside football for the players.

In the competition's inaugural season, Brisbane were coached by Anthony Griffin and captained by Alex Glenn. The Broncos finished the regular season in 2nd position, with 15 wins and 8 losses. The Broncos reached the Grand Final against the minor premiers the Canberra Raiders, but lost in Golden Point 28-24, the first Golden Point match in the competition's history.

Halfback Ben Hunt was crowned the competition's Player of the Year, having scored 17 tries, kicked 49 goals and set up 41 tries throughout the season. Winger Jharal Yow Yeh was named on the wing in the Team of the Year, scoring 27 tries in 26 games. Both re-signed in July for a further two seasons.

Fullback Josh Hoffman and hooker Andrew McCullough both made their NRL debuts throughout the 2008 NRL season, and have also re-signed with the club for another two seasons.

=== Notable achievements ===
Achievement	Player	Total
Most tries	Jharal Yow Yeh	27 tries (26 games)
Most goals	Jared Kahu	52/70 @74.29%
Most points	Ben Hunt	166 points (17 tries, 49 goals)
Most games	Alex Glenn (c), Matt Handcock	27 games

Round	Opponent	Result	Bris.	Opp.	Date	Venue
1	Penrith Panthers	Loss	24	28	16 March	Suncorp Stadium
2	Sydney Roosters	Loss	16	40	21 March	Sydney Football Stadium
3	North Queensland Cowboys	Win	32	10	28 March	Suncorp Stadium
4	Melbourne Storm	Win	28	24	4 April	Olympic Park
5	Newcastle Knights	Win	26	20	13 April	EnergyAustralia Stadium
6	Gold Coast Titans	Loss	20	30	18 April	Skilled Park
7	South Sydney Rabbitohs	Loss	16	28	25 April	Suncorp Stadium
8	Wests Tigers	Loss	18	31	3 May	ANZ Stadium
9	Manly-Warringah Sea Eagles	Win	42	12	11 May	Suncorp Stadium
10	Cronulla-Sutherland Sharks	Win	40	8	17 May	Toyota Park
11	Bye					
12	Parramatta Eels	Win	32	6	30 May	Suncorp Stadium
13	St. George Illawarra Dragons	Draw	22	22	6 June	WIN Stadium
14	Canberra Raiders	Loss	8	48	15 June	Canberra Stadium
15	Wests Tigers	Win	48	0	20 June	Suncorp Stadium
16	Penrith Panthers	Win	38	24	27 June	CUA Stadium
17	Bye					
18	Canterbury Bulldogs	Loss	16	33	13 July	Suncorp Stadium
19	North Queensland Cowboys	Win	34	16	18 July	Dairy Farmers Stadium
20	Cronulla-Sutherland Sharks	Win	40	4	25 July	Suncorp Stadium
21	Canberra Raiders	Loss	24	28	3 August	Suncorp Stadium
22	New Zealand Warriors	Win	32	12	9 August	Mt. Smart
23	St. George Illawarra Dragons	Win	30	22	15 August	Suncorp Stadium
24	Gold Coast Titans	Win	40	12	22 August	Suncorp Stadium
25	Canterbury Bulldogs	Win	40	12	31 August	Stadium Australia
26	Newcastle Knights	Win	18	6	5 September	Suncorp Stadium
QF	Canterbury Bulldogs	Win	28	22	12 September	Aussie Stadium
PF	New Zealand Warriors	Win	28	26	20 September	Aussie Stadium
GF	Canberra Raiders	Loss	24	28	28 September	ANZ Stadium

=== Ladder ===
2008 Toyota Cup season
Pos	Team	Pld	W	D	L	B	PF	PA	PD	Pts
1	Canberra Raiders (P)	24	18	0	6	2	744	581	+163	40
2	Brisbane Broncos	24	15	1	8	2	684	476	+208	35
3	New Zealand Warriors	24	14	3	7	2	721	533	+188	35
4	Penrith Panthers	24	15	1	8	2	692	583	+109	35
5	Parramatta Eels	24	14	3	7	2	578	564	+14	35
6	St George Illawarra Dragons	24	13	2	9	2	561	520	+41	32
7	Canterbury-Bankstown Bulldogs	24	12	3	9	2	711	587	+124	31
8	Gold Coast Titans	24	13	1	10	2	686	567	+119	31
9	Wests Tigers	24	13	0	11	2	620	623	-3	30
10	South Sydney Rabbitohs	24	11	2	11	2	618	584	+34	28
11	Manly Warringah Sea Eagles	24	11	0	13	2	519	532	-13	26
12	Newcastle Knights	24	8	1	15	2	526	630	-104	21
13	Melbourne Storm	24	8	1	15	2	512	638	-126	21
14	Cronulla-Sutherland Sharks	24	6	1	17	2	394	666	-272	17
15	Sydney Roosters	24	6	0	18	2	480	721	-241	16
16	North Queensland Cowboys	24	4	3	17	2	455	696	-241	15

== Feeder clubs ==
In 2008, the Broncos feeder clubs were Burleigh Bears, Easts Tigers, Central Comets, Norths Devils, Redcliffe Dolphins and Wynnum Manly Seagulls.

== See also ==
- NRL season 2008
- History of the Brisbane Broncos
