= 2009 Brisbane Broncos season =

NRL rugby league season

Coordinates: 27°27′53″S 153°0′34″E

- NRL rank: 6th
- Play-off result: Lost Preliminary Final, (Melbourne Storm, 40–10)
- 2008 record: Wins: 14; losses: 10
- Points scored: For: 511; against: 566

Team information
- Managing Director: Bruno Cullen
- Head Coach: Ivan Henjak
- Captain: Darren Lockyer
- Stadium: Suncorp Stadium
- Avg. attendance: 34,587
- Agg. attendance: 415,046
- High attendance: 50,109 (Round 19 v Rabbitohs)
- Low attendance: 20,114 (Round 22 v Sharks)

Top scorers
- Tries: Israel Folau (17)
- Goals: Corey Parker (75)
- Points: Corey Parker (170)
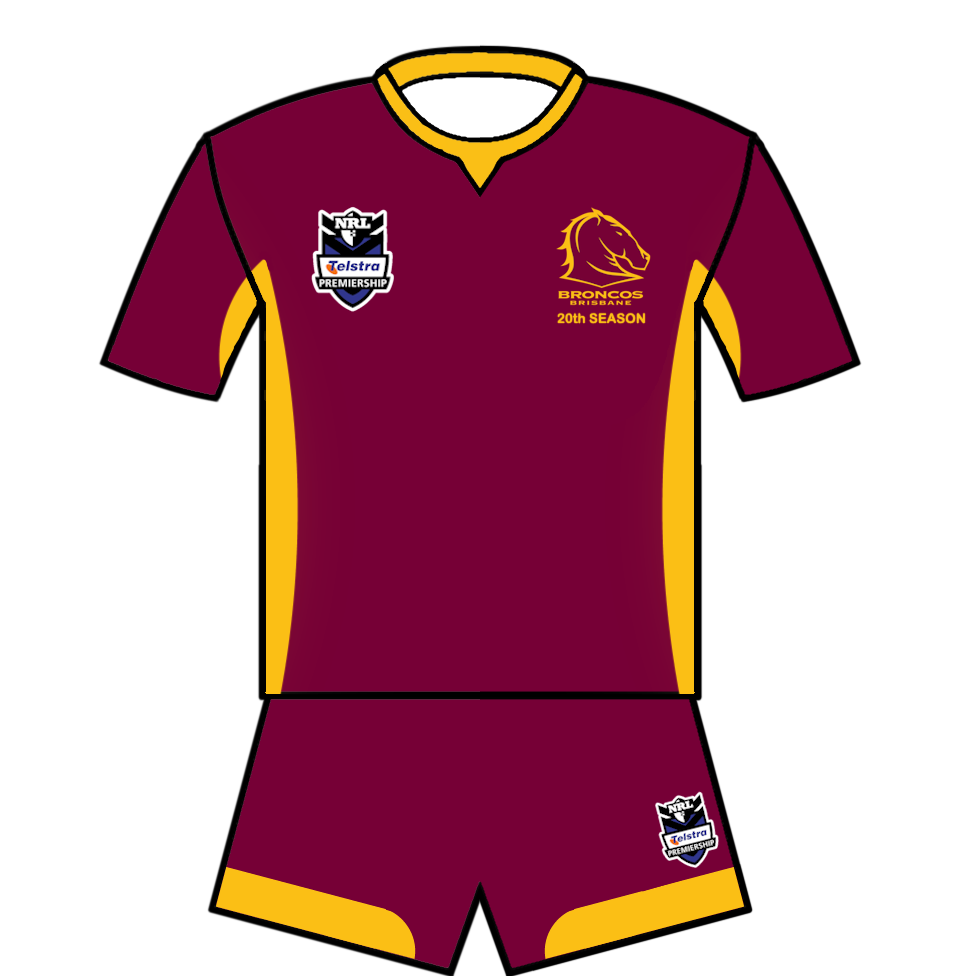
Home colours
← 2008	List of seasons	2010 →

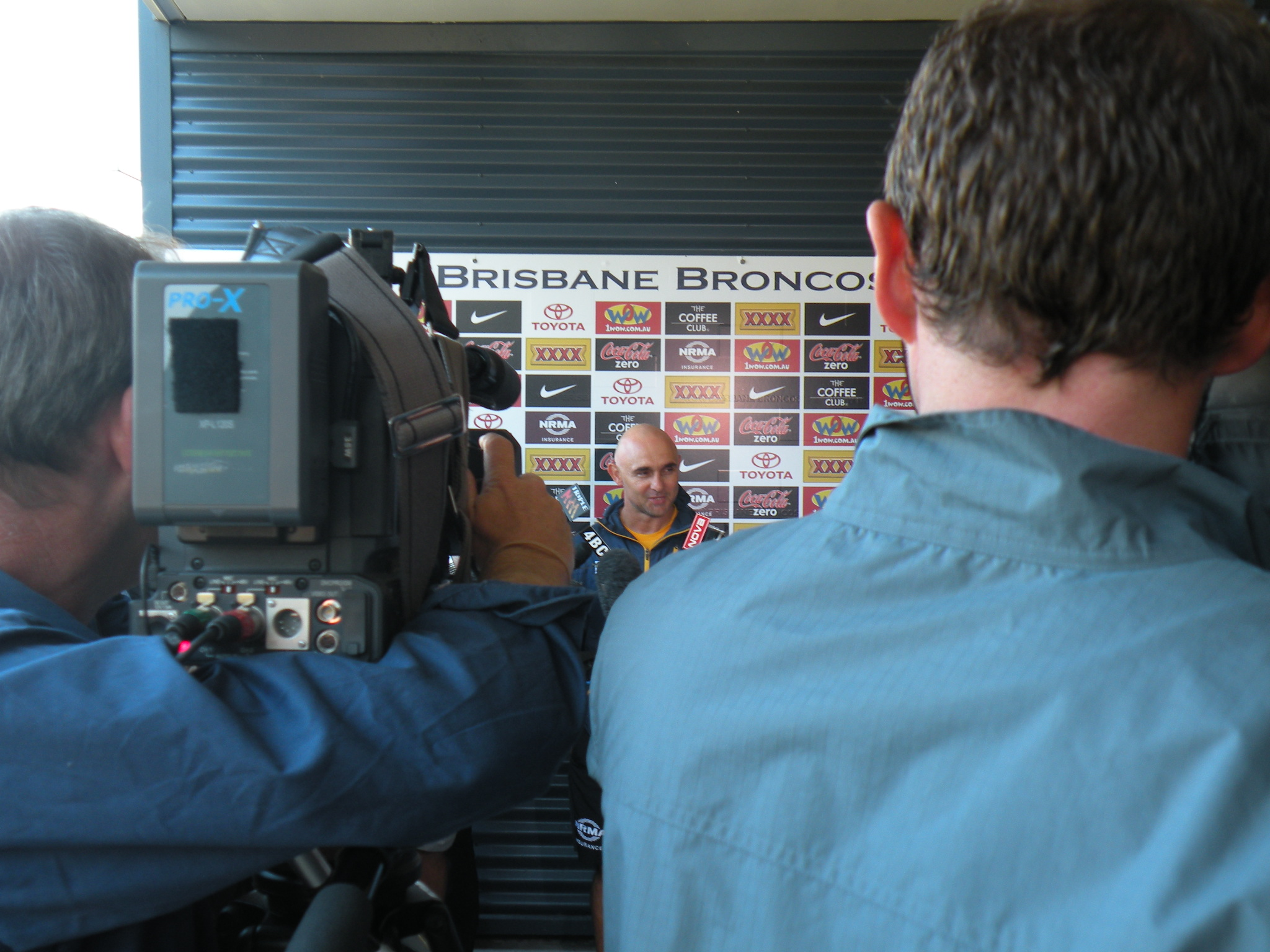
Broncos coach Ivan Henjak at a press conference in 2009.

The 2009 Brisbane Broncos season was the 22nd in the club's history and their first without foundation coach Wayne Bennett. They competed in the NRL's 2009 Telstra Premiership and by the 12th round were leading the competition, but then suffered one of their worst post-State of Origin form slumps ever and spent rounds 16 to 22 outside the top eight. The team managed to finish the regular season 6th (out of 16), qualifying for the finals for the 18th consecutive year. The Broncos then came within one match of the grand final but were knocked out for the 3rd season in a row by eventual premiers the Melbourne Storm (who months later were found to have been cheating the salary cap over the previous four seasons and had all honours achieved during the period nullified by the NRL).

== Season summary ==
=== Early season (Round 1—11) ===
In March 2009, the Broncos' post-Bennett era got off to a thrilling start in Round 1 when they defeated the North Queensland Cowboys 19–18 at Suncorp Stadium, in the first game with new coach Ivan Henjak in charge. Star signing Israel Folau scored his first try in Broncos colours and the first try of the season for the club in the 6th minute, followed by NRL debutantes Antonio Winterstein and Jharal Yow Yeh who also scored. Halfback Peter Wallace kicked the match winning field goal. In Round 2, the Broncos defeated the Melbourne Storm for the first time since the 2006 NRL Grand Final. Israel Folau went up against his old club for the first time and scored a try in the 11th minute, his second for the season. In Round 3, the Broncos travelled to Auckland to take on the Warriors and for the second year in a row, the Broncos won the opening three rounds of the season, defeating the New Zealand Warriors 26–10 at Mt Smart Stadium. In the following days Shane Webcke, who had been appointed assistant coach for Brisbane at the start of the season quit his post in the wake of controversy surrounding the release of his new book in which he was critical of some Broncos personnel.

In April 2009, Wayne Bennett coached against the Broncos for the first time, with the premiership-winning mentor returning to Suncorp Stadium in Round 4 with his St. George Illawarra Dragons, along with former Broncos players Darius Boyd, Neville Costigan and Wendell Sailor. The Broncos conceded their first loss of the season with the Dragons defeating the Broncos 25—12, with Sailor scoring a try. This was the Dragons' 8th straight win against the Broncos. In Round 5, the Broncos defeated the Sydney Roosters 24—28 at the Sydney Football Stadium, continuing their 7-year winning streak in the Good Friday match against the Roosters, In round 7, Darren Lockyer answered his critics as he helped the Broncos to a 40–8 win over the Parramatta Eels at Suncorp Stadium. Lockyer had a hand in most of the Broncos seven tries with Karmichael Hunt scoring three of the seven tries himself.

In May 2009, Darren Lockyer's 300th game did not go as planned when they faced the Newcastle Knights in Round 8. The match was played in torrential rain at EnergyAustralia Stadium, with the Broncos losing 28—12, the match punctuated by a 35-minute half-time break. In round 10, Israel Folau equalled the club record for most tries in a match when he scored 4 tries against the Gold Coast Titans at Suncorp Stadium. In Round 11, the Broncos beat a strong Wests Tigers side who were playing their 10th anniversary match, in a 20–18 win at Campbelltown Stadium.

=== Mid season slump (Round 13—21) ===
In June 2009, the Broncos suffered one of their worst defeats in the club's history when they lost 48–4 against the Melbourne Storm at Olympic Park in Round 13. The loss is also equalled second in the Broncos worst defeats. In the lead-up to the Round 14 fixture against the Canterbury-Bankstown Bulldogs, both the Broncos and Bulldogs were affected by the swine flu, with the Broncos almost boycotting the match due to quarantine orders. The Broncos gave up a 18—16 half-time lead to lose 22—44. Round 15 against the Sharks, the Broncos were without the availability of their 2011 Origin players, and debuts were handed to Dale Copley and Ben Hunt at Toyota Stadium. The Broncos lost 12—46. In Round 16, the Broncos lost to the Parramatta Eels 21—14.

In July 2009, boosted by the return of Tonie Carroll coming out of retirement, the Broncos snapped their 5-game losing streak, with a 28–14 win over the Warriors at Suncorp in Round 17. In Round 19, the Broncos again were defeated by a big margin at Suncorp, this time by the South Sydney Rabbitohs, losing 12—44. The Broncos had only won 1 game out of their last 6 games, and by the end of the round had found themselves outside the top eight for the first time during the season, leaving their finals hopes in danger. Karmichael Hunt made the announcement that he would be departing at seasons end and switching codes with the Gold Coast Suns.

In August 2009, days after the announcement of Karmichael Hunt's defection to AFL, the Broncos suffered one of their worst losses in their history, losing 56–0 to the Canberra Raiders 56–0 at Canberra Stadium in Round 21.

=== Late season charge (Round 22—Preliminary Final) ===
After losing 7 of their last 8 matches, the Broncos bounced back with a 30–10 win over the Cronulla-Sutherland Sharks in Round 22 at Suncorp, keeping their finals hopes alive. In Round 23, the Broncos demolished the Penrith Panthers 58—24 at Suncorp, putting themselves back inside the top eight for the first time since Round 18. In Round 24, the Broncos again took on Wayne Bennett and his Dragons, this time at WIN Stadium. The Broncos winning a hard fought 12—2 contest, their first win against the Dragons since Round 6 2006. In Round 25, the Broncos secured their 18th straight finals appearance when they beat Queensland rivals North Queensland Cowboys 16—10 at Dairy Farmers Stadium.

In September 2009, the Broncos made it 5 straight wins, defeating the Raiders 22—10 at Suncorp in Round 26. The Broncos finishing the regular season in 6th position, with 14 wins and 10 losses. The Broncos were the first opponent for the Gold Coast Titans competing in their first ever finals series. The Broncos survived a late comeback from the Titans holding on to a 40–32 win at Skilled Stadium. The Broncos made it consecutive wins over the Dragons for the first time since 2004 and their first win against the Dragons at Suncorp Stadium since 2004 with a 24–10 win against the Dragons in the semi-final at Suncorp Stadium. Source: Their chances against Melbourne in the grand final qualifier suffered a major blow when in form halfback Peter Wallace broke his ankle toward the end of that win against the Dragons. The Broncos 2009 season came to an end in the Preliminary Final going down 40–10 to eventual premiers, the Melbourne Storm at Etihad Stadium.

== Squad information ==
As of 26 September 2009

Cap.	Nat.	Player	Position	First Broncos game	Previous First Grade RL club
76	(Australia)	Darren Lockyer (c)	Five-eighth	1995	—N/a
79	(Australia)	Tonie Carroll	Second-row	1996	—N/a
100	(Australia)	Justin Hodges	Centre	2000	—N/a
106	(Australia)	Corey Parker	Lock	2001	—N/a
128	(Australia)	Sam Thaiday	Second-row	2003	—N/a
130	(Australia)	Karmichael Hunt	Fullback	2004	—N/a
138	(Australia)	Steve Michaels	Centre	2005	—N/a
139	(Australia)	Nick Kenny	Prop	2005	—N/a
148	(Australia)	Dave Taylor	Prop	2006	—N/a
158	(Australia)	Peter Wallace	Halfback	2008	(Australia) Penrith Panthers
159	(Australia)	Joel Clinton	Prop	2008	(Australia) Penrith Panthers
160	(Fiji)	Ashton Sims	Second-row	2008	(Australia) St. George Illawarra Dragons
161	(Australia)	PJ Marsh	Hooker	2008	(Australia) Parramatta Eels
163	(Australia)	Andrew McCullough	Hooker	2008	—N/a
164	(Samoa)	Isaak Ah Mau	Prop	2008	—N/a
165	(New Zealand)	Josh Hoffman	Fullback	2008	—N/a
167	(New Zealand)	Antonio Winterstein	Wing	2009	—N/a
168	(Australia)	Israel Folau	Centre	2009	(Australia) Melbourne Storm
169	(Australia)	Jharal Yow Yeh	Wing	2009	—N/a
170	(Australia)	Aaron Gorrell	Hooker	2009	(France) Catalans Dragons
171	(Samoa)	Ben Te'o	Second-row	2009	(Australia) Wests Tigers
172	(New Zealand)	Alex Glenn	Second-row	2009	—N/a
173	(Samoa)	Lagi Setu	Second-row	2009	(Australia) St. George Illawarra Dragons
174	(Australia)	Josh McGuire	Prop	2009	—N/a
175	(Australia)	Palmer Wapau	Second-row	2009	—N/a
176	(Australia)	Gerard Beale	Fullback	2009	—N/a
177	(Australia)	Dale Copley	Wing	2009	—N/a
178	(Australia)	Ben Hunt	Halfback	2009	—N/a
179	(Australia)	Guy Williams	Second-row	2009	—N/a
180	(Australia)	David Hala	Prop	2009	—N/a
—	(Australia)	Tom Hewitt	Wing	Yet to debut	(Australia) St. George Illawarra Dragons
—	(Australia)	Michael Spence	Second-row	Yet to debut	—N/a
—	(Australia)	Aaron Sweeney	Prop	Yet to debut	—N/a
—	(Australia)	Will Tupou	Centre	Yet to debut	—N/a

== Squad changes ==
=== Transfers in ===
Date	Position	Player	From	Year/s	Ref.
30 March 2008	Centre	Israel Folau	Melbourne Storm	2 Years	
15 July 2008	Second-row	Ben Te'o	Wests Tigers	1 Year	
26 July 2008	Second-row	Lagi Setu	St. George Illawarra Dragons	1 Year	
27 September 2008	Hooker	Aaron Gorrell	Catalans Dragons	1 Year	
2008	Wing	Antonio Winterstein	Easts Tigers	—	—
2008	Prop	Aaron Sweeney	Ipswich Jets	1 Year	—
30 June 2009	Second-row	Tonie Carroll	Retirement	End of season	

=== Transfers out ===
Date	Position	Player	To	Year/s	Ref.
11 January 2008	Lock	Tonie Carroll	Retirement	—N/a	
27 May 2008	Prop	Ben Hannant	Canterbury-Bankstown Bulldogs	3 Years	
28 May 2008	Wing	Denan Kemp	New Zealand Warriors	2 Years	
2 June 2008	Hooker	Michael Ennis	Canterbury-Bankstown Bulldogs	3 Years	
21 June 2008	Centre	Joel Moon	New Zealand Warriors	3 Years	
20 August 2008	Centre	Darius Boyd	St. George Illawarra Dragons	3 Years	
14 August 2008	Lock	Greg Eastwood	Leeds Rhinos	3 Years	
27 September 2008	Halfback	Shane Perry	Catalans Dragons	1 Year	
2008	Centre	Nick Emmett	St. George Illawarra Dragons	2 Years	
22 December 2008	Second-row	David Stagg	Canterbury-Bankstown Bulldogs	2 Years	

== Coaching staff ==
Name	Role
Ivan Henjak	Head coach
Paul Green	Assistant Coach
Allan Langer	Skills Coach
Peter Ryan	Defensive Coach
Dean Benton	Physical Performance Director
Andrew Croll	Athletic Performance Coach
Dan Baker	Strength Coach
Tim Gabbett	Sports Scientist
Anthony Griffin	Under-20s Coach

Shane Webcke was an Assistant Coach up until 6 April 2009, when he resigned from his role due to the controversy surrounding his auto-biography "Hard Road". In addition, international cricketer and long-time Broncos fan Andrew Symonds was adopted by the club in an unpaid role assisting the coaching staff following his exile from cricket.

== Staff changes ==
=== Transfers in ===
Date	Role	Person	From	Year/s	Ref.
19 April 2008	Head coach	Ivan Henjak	Assistant coach	2 Years	
1 May 2008	Performance Director	Dean Benton	Leicester Tigers	—	

=== Transfers out ===
Date	Role	Person	To	Year/s	Ref.
5 February 2008	Director of Coaching	Wayne Bennett	St. George Illawarra Dragons	3 Years	
1 May 2008	Performance Director	Jeremy Hickmans	St. George Illawarra Dragons	—	

== Matches ==
Round	Opponent	Result	BRI.	OPP.	Venue	Date	Crowd	Position
Trial	Gold Coast Titans	Win	24	18	Kougari Oval, Wynnum	14 February	3,500	
Trial	Canberra Raiders	Win	30	16	Dolphin Oval, Redcliffe	21 February	10,500	
Trial	Melbourne Storm	Loss	6	20	Quad Park, Kawana	28 February	8,178	
1	North Queensland Cowboys	Win	19	18	Suncorp Stadium	13 March	45,022	8/16
2	Melbourne Storm	Win	16	14	Suncorp Stadium	20 March	36,647	3/16
3	New Zealand Warriors	Win	26	10	Mt Smart Stadium	28 March	24,350	1/16
4	St. George Illawarra Dragons	Loss	12	25	Suncorp Stadium	3 April	42,435	4/16
5	Sydney Roosters	Win	28	24	Sydney Football Stadium	10 April	18,464	3/16
6	Penrith Panthers	Win	38	18	CUA Stadium	17 April	14,332	2/16
7	Parramatta Eels	Win	40	8	Suncorp Stadium	24 April	30,887	1/16
8	Newcastle Knights	Loss	12	28	EnergyAustralia Stadium	2 May	18,154	3/16
9	Manly Sea Eagles	Loss	20	22	Suncorp Stadium	10 May	27,527	3/16
10	Gold Coast Titans	Win	32	18	Suncorp Stadium	15 May	43,079	4/16
11	Wests Tigers	Win	20	18	Campbelltown Stadium	22 May	9,675	3/16
12	Bye							2/16
13	Melbourne Storm	Loss	4	48	Olympic Park	5 June	15,316	2/16
14	Canterbury Bulldogs	Loss	22	44	Suncorp Stadium	12 June	26,353	5/16
15	Cronulla Sharks	Loss	12	46	Toyota Park	22 June	8,117	7/16
16	Parramatta Eels	Loss	14	21	Parramatta Stadium	26–29 June	10,030	9/16
17	New Zealand Warriors	Win	28	14	Suncorp Stadium	3–6 July	32,456	9/16
18	Bye					10–13 July		/16
19	South Sydney Rabbitohs	Loss	12	44	Suncorp Stadium	17 July	50,109	/16
20	Gold Coast Titans	Loss	18	34	Skilled Park	24 July	26,336	/16
21	Canberra Raiders	Loss	0	56	Canberra Stadium	1 August	10,200	/16
22	Cronulla Sharks	Win	30	10	Suncorp Stadium	10 August	20,114	10/16
23	Penrith Panthers	Win	58	24	Suncorp Stadium	16 August	25,305	8/16
24	St. George Illawarra Dragons	Win	12	2	WIN Stadium	21 August	17,044	7/16
25	North Queensland Cowboys	Win	16	10	Dairy Farmers Stadium	28 August	24,332	/16
26	Canberra Raiders	Win	22	10	Suncorp Stadium	6 September	35,112	6/16
QF	Gold Coast Titans	Win	40	32	Skilled Park	12 September	27,227	
SF	St. George Illawarra Dragons	Win	24	10	Suncorp Stadium	19 September	50,225	
PF	Melbourne Storm	Loss	10	40	Etihad Stadium	26 September	27,687	

=== Ladder ===
2009 NRL season
Pos	Team	Pld	W	D	L	B	PF	PA	PD	Pts
1	St. George Illawarra Dragons	24	17	0	7	2	548	329	+219	38
2	Canterbury-Bankstown Bulldogs	24	18	0	6	2	575	428	+147	38^{1}
3	Gold Coast Titans	24	16	0	8	2	514	467	+47	36
4	Melbourne Storm	24	14	1	9	2	505	348	+157	33
5	Manly-Warringah Sea Eagles	24	14	0	10	2	549	459	+90	32
6	Brisbane Broncos	24	14	0	10	2	511	566	−55	32
7	Newcastle Knights	24	13	0	11	2	508	491	+17	30
8	Parramatta Eels	24	12	1	11	2	476	473	+3	29
9	Wests Tigers	24	12	0	12	2	558	483	+75	28
10	South Sydney Rabbitohs	24	11	1	12	2	566	549	+17	27
11	Penrith Panthers	24	11	1	12	2	515	589	−74	27
12	North Queensland Cowboys	24	11	0	13	2	558	474	+84	26
13	Canberra Raiders	24	9	0	15	2	489	520	−31	22
14	New Zealand Warriors	24	7	2	15	2	377	565	−188	20
15	Cronulla-Sutherland Sharks	24	5	0	19	2	359	568	−209	14
16	Sydney Roosters	24	5	0	19	2	382	681	−299	14

^{1} The Bulldogs were deducted 2 competition points after an interchange breach in Round 2.

== Representative honours ==
This table lists all players who played a representative match in 2009.

Player	2009 Anzac Test	City vs Country Origin	State of Origin 1	State of Origin 2	State of Origin 3	2009 Four Nations
Israel Folau	Australia	—N/a	Queensland	Queensland	Queensland	—
Justin Hodges	Australia	—N/a	Queensland	—	Queensland	Australia
Karmichael Hunt	—	—N/a	Queensland	Queensland	Queensland	—
Darren Lockyer (c)	Australia (c)	—N/a	Queensland (c)	Queensland (c)	Queensland (c)	Australia (c)
Sam Thaiday	—	—N/a	Queensland	Queensland	Queensland	Australia
Peter Wallace	—	City	New South Wales	New South Wales	—	—

== Statistics ==
Player	Tries	Goals	Field Goals	Points
Corey Parker	5	75	0	170
Israel Folau	17	0	0	68
Antonio Winterstein	14	0	0	56
Karmichael Hunt	11	0	0	44
Jharal Yow Yeh	9	0	0	36
Steve Michaels	8	0	0	32
Alex Glenn	6	0	0	24
Peter Wallace	2	6	1	21
David Taylor	5	0	0	20
Ben Te'o	4	0	0	16
Darren Lockyer	4	0	0	16
Justin Hodges	3	0	0	12
Sam Thaiday	3	0	0	12
Lagi Setu	3	0	0	12
Joel Clinton	2	0	0	8
Josh McGuire	2	0	0	8
Ashton Sims	2	0	0	8
Andrew McCullough	2	0	0	8
Nick Kenny	1	0	0	4
TOTAL	103	81	1	585

== Awards ==
=== League ===
- Nil

=== Club ===
- Player of the year: Corey Parker
- Rookie of the year: Andrew McCullough
- Back of the year: Justin Hodges
- Forward of the year: Sam Thaiday
- Club man of the year: Nick Kenny

== NRL Under-20s ==
In 2009, the Broncos Under-20s team was again coached by Anthony Griffin. The 2008 captain, Alex Glenn was replaced as captain by lock Guy Ford after Glenn graduated to the NRL squad on a full-time basis. The Broncos Under-20s finished the regular season in 5th position, with 15 wins and 9 losses. The Broncos were defeated by eventual premiers, the Melbourne Storm in the preliminary finals 40-16.

Gerard Beale, Dale Copley, David Hala, Ben Hunt, Josh McGuire and Jharal Yow Yeh all made their NRL debuts throughout the 2009 NRL season.

=== Notable statistics ===
Statistic	Player	Total
Most Tries	Todd Murphy	15 Tries (24 Games)
Most Goals	Corey Norman	52/70 @72.29%
Most Points	Ben Hunt, Corey Norman	132 Points
Most Games	Tariq Sims	27 Games

=== Ladder ===
Pos	Team	Pld	W	D	L	B	PF	PA	PD	Pts	
1	Manly Warringah Sea Eagles (M)	24	19	1	4	2	879	417	+462	39	Advance to finals series
2	St. George Illawarra Dragons	24	19	0	5	2	758	461	+297	38	Advance to finals series
3	Melbourne Storm (P)	24	19	0	5	2	833	597	+236	38	Advance to finals series
4	Wests Tigers	24	15	1	8	2	709	588	+121	31	Advance to finals series
5	Brisbane Broncos	24	15	0	9	2	698	551	+147	30	Advance to finals series
6	South Sydney Rabbitohs	24	13	1	10	2	776	568	+208	27	Advance to finals series
7	New Zealand Warriors	24	13	1	10	2	725	612	+113	27	Advance to finals series
8	Canberra Raiders	24	11	2	11	2	706	685	+21	24	Advance to finals series
9	North Queensland Cowboys	24	12	0	12	2	668	683	−15	24	
10	Newcastle Knights	24	9	1	14	2	596	756	−160	19	
11	Canterbury Bulldogs	24	9	1	14	2	649	867	−218	19	
12	Parramatta Eels	24	8	0	16	2	604	698	−94	16	
13	Penrith Panthers	24	8	0	16	2	573	755	−182	16	
14	Gold Coast Titans	24	8	0	16	2	542	738	−196	16	
15	Sydney Roosters	24	6	0	18	2	443	736	−293	12	
16	Cronulla-Sutherland Sharks (W)	24	4	0	20	2	391	838	−447	8	

Updated to match(es) played on 4 October 2009. Source: 2009 NYC Toyota Cup - RLP, 2009 NRL Under-20s season
(M) Minor premiers; (P) Premiers; (W) Wooden spoon
