= 2007 Queensland Cup =

- Duration: March 16 – September 15, 2007
- Teams: 11
- Premiers: Tweed Heads Seagulls (1st title)
- Minor premiers: North Queensland Young Guns (2nd title)
- Matches played: 116
- Points scored: 5,447
- Top points scorer: Nick Parfitt
- Player of the year: Shannon Walker (Courier Mail Medal)
- Top try-scorer(s): Rory Bromley; John Tamanika

The 2007 Queensland Cup season was the 12th season of Queensland's top-level statewide rugby league competition run by the Queensland Rugby League. The competition, known as the Queensland Wizard Cup due to sponsorship from Wizard Home Loans featured 11 teams playing a 26-week long season (including finals) from March to September.

The Tweed Heads Seagulls became the first team from outside of Queensland to win the Queensland Cup when they defeated the Redcliffe Dolphins 28–18 at Suncorp Stadium. Tweed Heads' fullback Shannon Walker was named the competition's Player of the Year, winning the Courier Mail Medal.

== Teams ==
11 teams participated in the Queensland Cup again in 2007, with the Aspley Broncos replacing the Toowoomba Clydesdales.

Colours	Club	Home ground(s)	Head coach(s)	Captain(s)	NRL Affiliate
	Aspley Broncos	Suncorp Stadium	Mark Gee	Nick Kenny	Brisbane Broncos
	Burleigh Bears	Pizzey Park	Jim Lenihan	Ryan Gundry	Gold Coast Titans
	Central Comets	Browne Park	Steve Anderson	Wayne Barnett	None
	Easts Tigers	Langlands Park	Michael Booth	Trent Young	None
	Ipswich Jets	QLD Group Stadium, Carrara Stadium	Kevin Walters	Danny Coburn	Gold Coast Titans
	North Queensland Young Guns	Dairy Farmers Stadium	Matt Parish	Shane Muspratt	North Queensland Cowboys
	Norths Devils	Bishop Park	Kevin Carmichael	Marc Brentnall	Melbourne Storm
	Redcliffe Dolphins	Dolphin Oval	Anthony Griffin	Troy Lindsay	Brisbane Broncos
	Souths Logan Magpies	Davies Park, Brandon Park	Jason Burnham & Brandon Costin	Cameron Joyce	None
	Tweed Heads Seagulls	Piggabeen Sports Complex	Troy McCarthy	Andrew Moroney, Brad Davis	Gold Coast Titans
	Wynnum Manly Seagulls	Kougari Oval	Shane McNally	Jimmy Ahmat	None

== Ladder ==
2007 Queensland Cup
Pos	Team	Pld	W	D	L	B	PF	PA	PD	Pts
1	North Queensland Young Guns	20	15	0	5	2	566	355	+211	34
2	Redcliffe Dolphins	20	14	0	6	2	516	338	+178	32
3	Tweed Heads Seagulls (P)	20	13	1	6	2	546	404	+142	31
4	Ipswich Jets	20	13	1	6	2	510	400	+110	31
5	Easts Tigers	20	11	0	9	2	426	448	−22	26
6	Aspley Broncos	20	10	1	9	2	469	441	+28	25
7	Burleigh Bears	20	9	0	11	2	550	478	+72	22
8	Norths Devils	20	8	1	11	2	507	524	−17	21
9	Wynnum Manly Seagulls	20	8	0	12	2	399	539	−140	20
10	Souths Logan Magpies	20	5	0	15	2	384	580	−196	14
11	Central Comets	20	2	0	18	2	310	666	−356	8

== Finals series ==
Home	Score	Away	Match information
Home	Score	Away	Date and time	Venue
Qualifying Finals
Ipswich Jets	18–16	Easts Tigers	25 August 2007	QLD Group Stadium
Redcliffe Dolphins	22–18	Tweed Heads Seagulls	25 August 2007	Dolphin Oval
Semi-finals
North Queensland Young Guns	18–28	Redcliffe Dolphins	31 August 2007	Dairy Farmers Stadium
Tweed Heads Seagulls	40–14	Ipswich Jets	1 September 2007	Piggabeen Sports Complex
Preliminary Finals
North Queensland Young Guns	10–34	Tweed Heads Seagulls	8 September 2007	Langlands Park
Grand Final
Redcliffe Dolphins	18–28	Tweed Heads Seagulls	15 September 2007	Suncorp Stadium

Qualifying / Elimination Finals
2	Redcliffe	22
3	Tweed Heads	18
4	Ipswich	18
5	Easts	16

Major / Minor Semi-finals
1	North Qld	18
Redcliffe	28
Tweed Heads	40
Ipswich	14

Preliminary Final
North Qld	10
Tweed Heads	34

Grand Final
Redcliffe	18
Tweed Heads	28

== Grand Final ==
Saturday, 15 September

Redcliffe Dolphins	18–28	Tweed Heads Seagulls
Tries: Rory Bromley 1 Nick Emmett 1 Chris Fox 1 Goals: Alwyn Simpson 3	1st: 6 – 18; 2nd: 12 – 10; Report	Tries: 2 David Myles; 2 Shannon Walker; 1 Brad Davis; Goals: 4 Brad Davis

Suncorp Stadium
Attendance: 7,000
Referee: Gavin Morris
Player of the Match: Brad Davis (Tweed Heads)

Redcliffe Dolphins	Position	Tweed Heads Seagulls
1. Ryan Cullen	FB	1. Shannon Walker
2. Alwyn Simpson	WG	2. Nathanael Barnes
3. Matt Harris	CE	3. David Myles
4. Nick Emmett	CE	4. James Wood
5. Rory Bromley	WG	5. Josh Vaughan
6. Daniel Green	FE	6. Brad Davis (c)
7. Chris Fox	HB	7. Tim Maccan
8. Troy Lindsay (c)	PR	8. Roy Friend
9. Mick Roberts	HK	9. Matt King
10. Adam Starr	PR	10. Chris Enahoro
11. Nathan Tutt	SR	11. Will Matthews
12. Danny Burke	SR	12. Selasi Berdie
13. Grant Flugge	LK	13. Matthew Pow
14. Pat Gardner	Bench	14. Andre Amato
15. Mark Shipway	Bench	15. Matthew Austin
16. Palmer Wapau	Bench	16. Daniel Molenaar
17. Marty Turner	Bench	17. Daniel Evans
Anthony Griffin	Coach	Troy McCarthy

Reigning premiers Redcliffe, who finished the regular season in 2nd, were the first team to qualify for the Grand Final after defeating Tweed Heads in Week 1 and North Queensland in the major semi-final. It would be their nine Grand Final appearance in 12 seasons. After losing to Redcliffe, Tweed Heads faced Ipswich in an elimination final, which they won 40–14. A week later, they scored a major upset over minor premiers North Queensland to progress to their first Queensland Cup Grand Final appearance.

=== First half ===
Redcliffe opened their premiership defence strongly when halfback Chris Fox scored in the ninth minute. Tweed Heads hit back in the 18th minute when David Myles latched onto a Tim Maccan grubber to score. The Seagulls moved into the lead for the first time when captain Brad Davis stepped through some soft defence to score under the posts. Tweed Heads extended their lead to 12 just seconds before half time when Davis sent Myles over for his second try of the game.

=== Second half ===
The Dolphins got the scoring underway in the second half when centre Nick Emmett dived onto a kick from his winger Alwyn Simpson to get Redcliffe back into the contest. 10 minutes later, Tweed Heads pushed the lead back to 12 when the competition's Player of the Year Shannon Walker backed up a Maccan line break to score. Walker sealed the game for his side just five minutes later when he returned a Dolphins' kick 80 metres to score in the corner. Redcliffe gave themselves a small chance late when winger Rory Bromley crossed in the 74th minute but it wasn't enough as Tweed Heads won their first premiership. They became the first club from outside of Queensland to win the competition.

Seagulls' captain Brad Davis was named Man of the Match and awarded the first ever Duncan Hall Medal, named in honour of the Hall of Famer, who played 24 games for Queensland and 22 Tests for Australia.

The loss in the Grand Final would effectively end the Redcliffe Dolphins dominant run in the Queensland Cup. From 1996 to 2007, the club won five premierships, appeared in nine of 12 Grand Finals and won three minor premierships. They would not qualify for another Grand Final until 2012 and would not win another until 2018.

== End-of-season awards ==
- Courier Mail Medal (Best and Fairest): Shannon Walker ( Tweed Heads Seagulls)
- QANTAS Player of the Year (Coaches Award): Trent Young ( Easts Tigers)
- Coach of the Year: Anthony Griffin ( Redcliffe Dolphins)
- Rookie of the Year: Shannon Walker ( Tweed Heads Seagulls)
- Representative Player of the Year: Shane Muspratt ( Queensland Residents, North Queensland Young Guns)

== See also ==
- Queensland Cup
- Queensland Rugby League
