= Peter Wallace (rugby league) =

Former Scotland international rugby league footballer

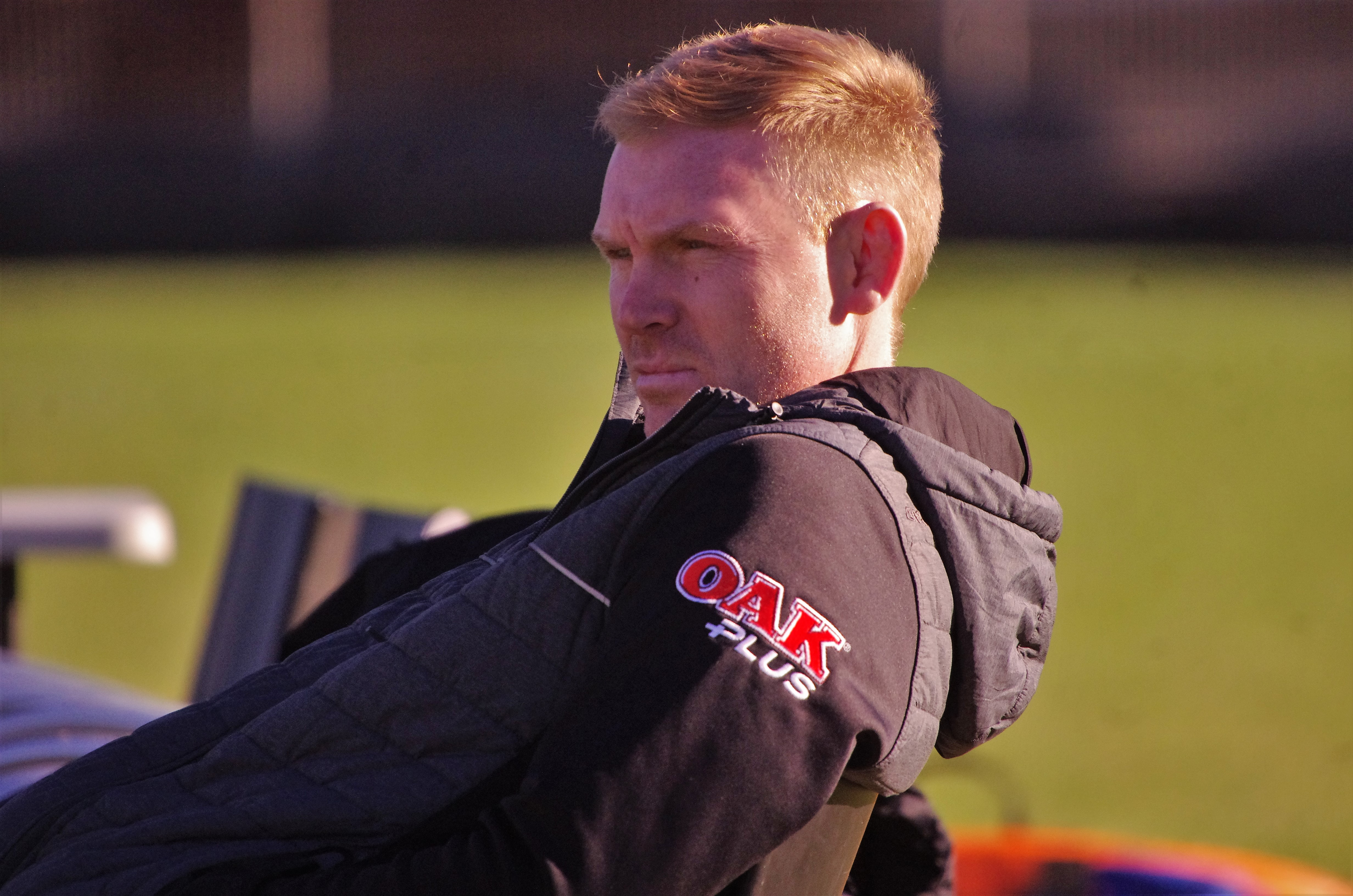

Personal information
- Full name: Peter James Wallace
- Born: 16 October 1985 (age 41) Melbourne, Victoria, Australia

Playing information
- Height: 178 cm (5 ft 10 in)
- Weight: 87 kg (13 st 10 lb)
- Position: Halfback, Hooker, Five-eighth
Club
Years	Team	Pld	T	G	FG	P
2005–07	Penrith Panthers	20	2	5	1	19
2008–13	Brisbane Broncos	139	20	66	4	216
2014–18	Penrith Panthers	81	12	11	3	73
	Total	240	34	82	8	308
Representative
Years	Team	Pld	T	G	FG	P
2008–09	City Origin	2	1	6	0	16
2008–09	New South Wales	4	0	0	0	0
2013	Scotland	4	0	0	0	0

Peter James Wallace (born 16 October 1985) is a retired Australian footballer who played for the Penrith Panthers, the Brisbane Broncos in the NRL and represented Scotland in international rugby league.

A New South Wales State of Origin representative, Wallace began his career playing as a halfback but later moved to hooker. He announced his immediate retirement following a string of injuries on 12 June 2018. He works as an assistant coach for the Penrith Panthers, and is set to become the club's head coach at the start of the 2028 season, following current head coach Ivan Cleary announcing that he was finishing his contract at the end of the 2027 season.

== Background ==
Wallace was born in Melbourne, Victoria, Australia, and raised in Blaxland, New South Wales by his mother Dianne. Wallace has never met his father, who reportedly remained in Melbourne.

He attended Blaxland East Public School and Blaxland High School, and played his junior rugby league for Lower Mountains Eagles before moving to St Marys Saints at the age of 12.

Wallace is of Scottish descent through his maternal grandmother.

== Playing career ==
=== Penrith Panthers ===
Wallace made his NRL début at Canberra Stadium against the Canberra Raiders in round 17 of the 2005 season.

He did not feature throughout the entire 2006 NRL season for Penrith.

In round 3, 2007, against the Brisbane Broncos, Wallace kicked a 44-metre field goal in golden point, with Penrith winning 29–28.

Wallace was the subject of controversy when he was dropped to NSWRL Premier League in round 15 of the NRL competition in 2007. Penrith coach Matthew Elliott moved Wallace to the Premier League on what he claimed to be poor form. However, Wallace had earned a man-of-the-match award only two weeks before, but had a poor game the week later.

Wallace in action for Brisbane in 2008

The controversy came when claims were made that Wallace was dropped due to the fact that he had signed with the Broncos, but teammate Joel Clinton, who was also Brisbane-bound, wasn't dropped. There were rumours from the media that Wallace wanted out of the Penrith Panthers to go to Brisbane mid-season. Wallace denied these claims and wanted to fulfil his contract with the Penrith club, even if it was in the Premier League. It remains unclear how the move to the Brisbane club came about.

=== Brisbane Broncos ===
Wallace's career at the Brisbane Broncos started in 2008. He guided his new club to a first-round victory over his old club, the Penrith Panthers, before picking up consecutive "Man of the Match" awards in his next two matches, also winning for Brisbane. Wallace performed very strongly while Darren Lockyer was injured and provided much-needed stability in Brisbane's halves and a good kicking game.

Wallace was selected for the City vs Country Origin match in 2008. In May 2008, Wallace was selected as halfback for New South Wales for game I of State of Origin on 21 May at ANZ Stadium. With his first touch of the ball, he made a line break. He also had a hand in two tries and placed an accurate kick for Anthony Quinn to score the second try of the night. He made only one error and took many hits from Queensland players, making 29 tackles.

Wallace was selected for the Blues again in Game II (playing on his normal home ground) before he ruptured a testicle and missed Game III. After State of Origin ended, Wallace was reunited with halves partner Darren Lockyer at the Broncos. On 15 July 2008, Wallace extended his contract with the Brisbane Broncos until 2012.

On 20 October 2008, Wallace was arrested after a scuffle with security at a pub in Mooloolaba, Queensland, where it was believed he was celebrating his 23rd birthday.

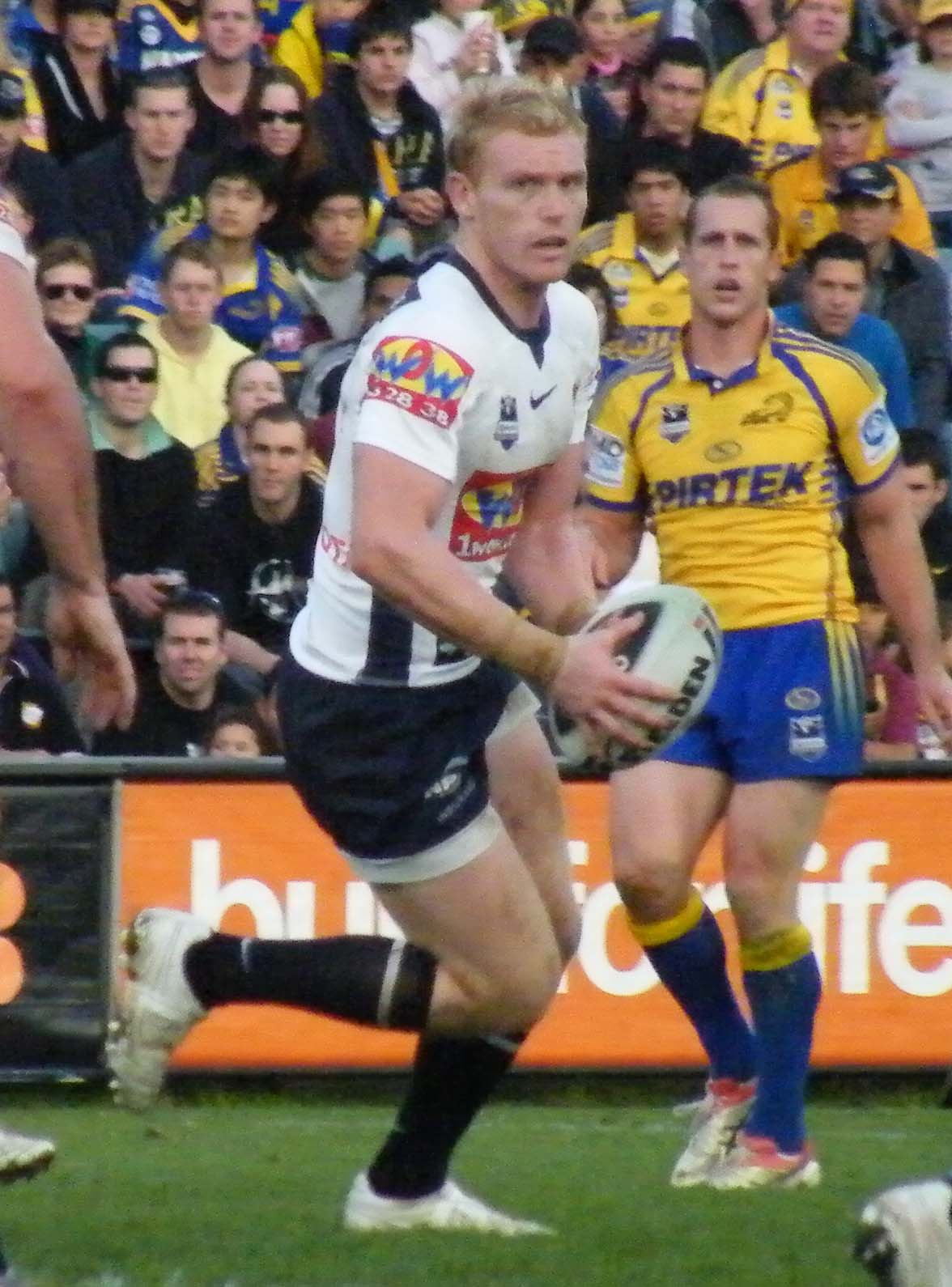
Wallace playing for the Broncos in 2009

He was selected for NSW City in the City vs Country match on 8 May 2009. Later in the month he was named in the 17-man squad to represent New South Wales in the opening State of Origin match on 3 June 2009, in Melbourne.

Wallace was injured at the time of Brisbane's 2009 post-Origin slump, and upon his return, the club enjoyed its best winning streak in five years, reaching the finals. However, in Brisbane's second play-off win, Wallace broke his ankle, meaning he would miss the grand final qualifier.

At the end of the 2013 NRL season, Wallace was selected to represent Scotland at the 2013 Rugby League World Cup held in Europe.

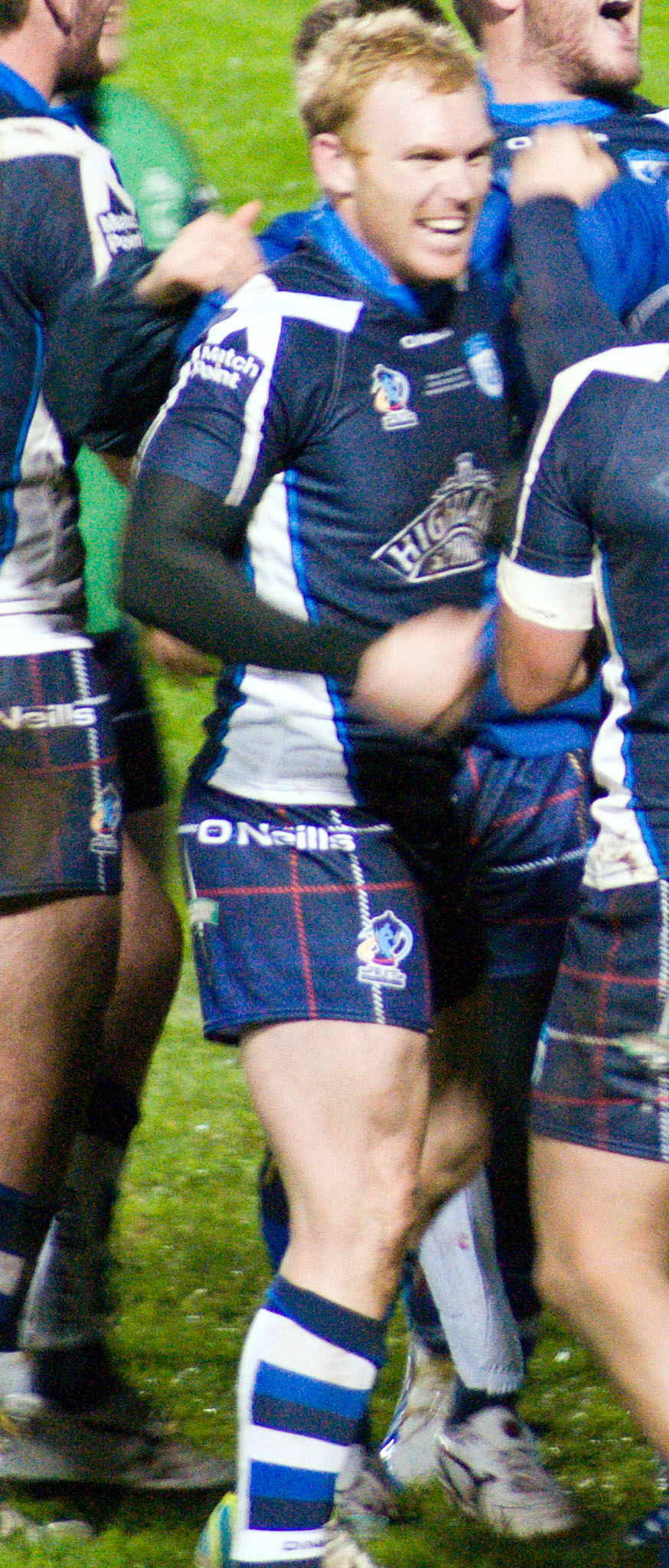
Wallace playing for Scotland at the 2013 RLWC

=== Return to Penrith ===
Wallace played for the Penrith Panthers again from the 2014 NRL season. He sustained a season-ending ruptured anterior cruciate ligament in his left knee on 27 July 2014. Wallace finished off the 2015 NRL season playing 13 games and scoring two tries In 2016, from round 2-8 Wallace had a temporary and successful shift from halfback to hooker. In round 9 of the 2016 NRL season, Wallace kicked the match winning field goal in Penrith's 19-18 win against the Canberra Raiders. Wallace would return to the hooker role after James Segeyaro was dropped to NSW Cup. Wallace played his 200th NRL career game in round 16, against the South Sydney Rabbitohs in Penrith's 28-26 win. Playing well at his newfound position, Wallace signed a two-year deal with the club on 25 July 2016, extending his contract with Penrith to the end of 2018. Playing an instrumental part in helping Penrith reach the finals, he finished off the year as the Penrith club's most experienced player and their first-choice hooker. He played in all 26 games, scoring five tries, kicking three goals, and one field goal. He played 19 games in 2017 NRL season, scoring two tries. On 12 June 2018, Wallace announced his retirement from the NRL effective immediately. The Penrith club released a statement in which general manager Phil Gould praised the 32-year-old for his "incredibly selfless act". Gould revealed that Wallace had played the last two seasons with no anterior cruciate ligament (ACL) after a failed knee reconstruction. Wallace joined Penrith's coaching staff immediately as he transitioned into life after playing.

=== Scotland ===
Eligible through his maternal grandmother, Wallace was unable to represent Scotland at the 2008 World Cup due to treatment for injuries.

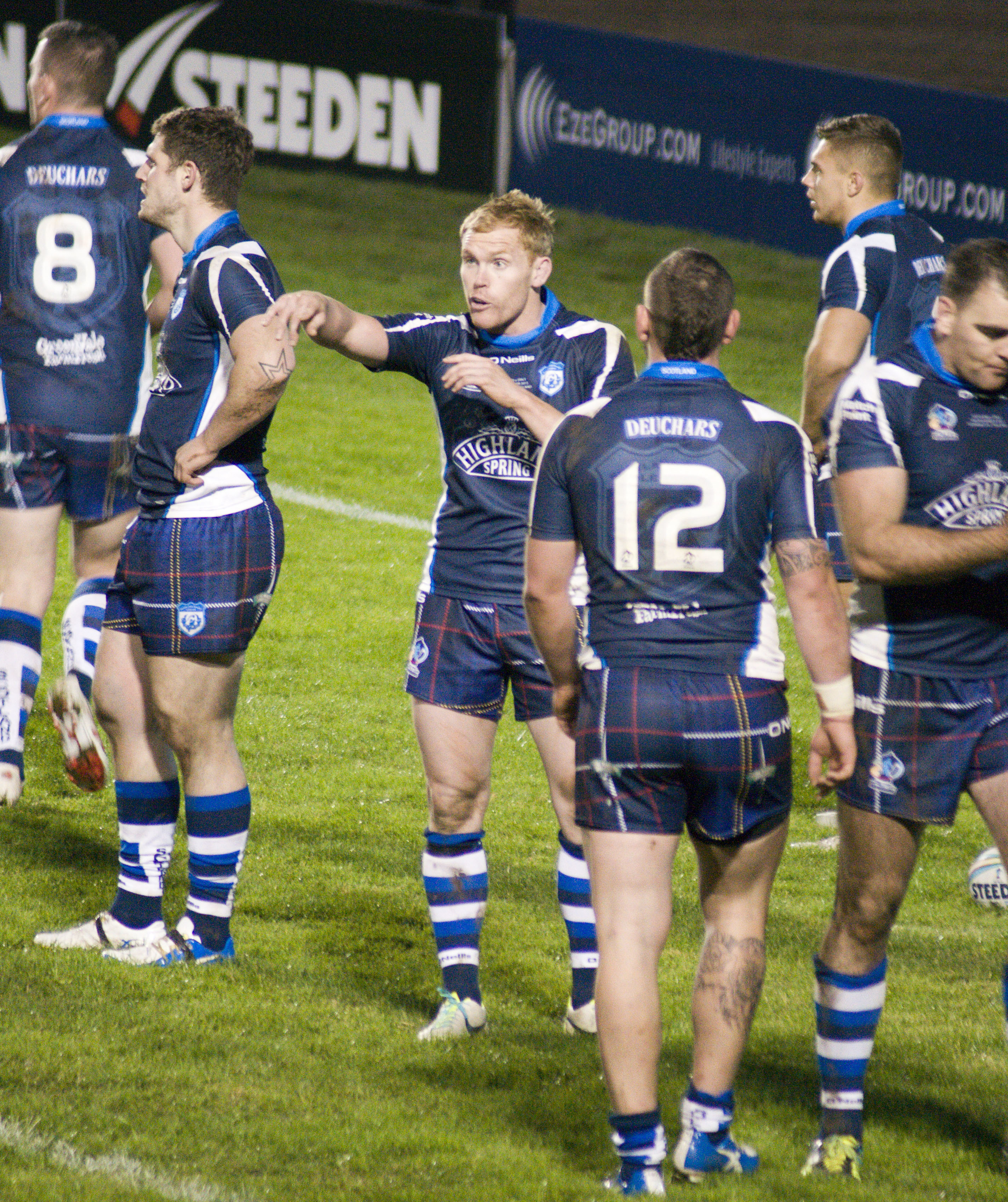
Wallace playing for Scotland at the 2013 World Cup

He made his international début at the 2013 World Cup, playing at halfback in all four of Scotland's matches.

Wallace was unavailable for the 2016 Four Nations due to an elbow injury sustained at the end of the 2016 NRL season.

The following year, Wallace was forced to withdraw from Scotland's 2017 World Cup squad to recover from numerous injuries obtained throughout the 2017 NRL season.

== Post playing ==
On 13 May 2026, head coach of the Penrith Panthers Ivan Cleary announced he would be departing from the head coach role at the end of the 2027 season, with Wallace to become head coach in 2028.

== Statistics ==
Season	Team	Pld	T	G	FG	P
2005	Penrith Panthers	1	-	-	-	-
2006	Penrith Panthers	-	-	-	-	-
2007	Penrith Panthers	19	2	5	1	19
2008	Brisbane Broncos	21	5	8	-	36
2009	Brisbane Broncos	23	2	6	1	21
2010	Brisbane Broncos	21	2	5	-	18
2011	Brisbane Broncos	27	5	10	2	42
2012	Brisbane Broncos	23	4	36	1	89
2013	Brisbane Broncos	24	2	1	-	10
2014	Penrith Panthers	14	1	6	1	17
2015	Penrith Panthers	13	2	2	1	13
2016	Penrith Panthers	26	5	8	1	33
2017	Penrith Panthers	19	2	-	-	8
2018	Penrith Panthers	9	2	-	-	8
	Totals	240	34	82	8	308
