= Aspley Broncos =

Australian rugby league club, based in Brisbane, QLD

Club information
- Full name: Aspley Rugby League Football Club
- Nickname: The Broncos
- Colours: maroon, gold, teal
- Founded: 1967 (as the Aspley Devils)
- Exited: 2007
- Website: aspleyfootballclub.com.au

Former details
- Ground: Bishop Park
- CEO: Jim Spletter
- Coach: Mark Gee
- Captain: Trent Young
- Competition: Queensland Cup, Brisbane Rugby League
- 2007: 6th

The Aspley Broncos (formerly Aspley Demons and Aspley Devils) are a rugby league club in Brisbane, Australia. Aspley competes in the FOGS Cup and FOGS Colts Challenge competitions. In 2007 they competed in the Queensland Cup as a feeder club to the Brisbane Broncos.

== History ==
=== Beginning ===
The Aspley RLFC first became a member of the Brisbane Rugby League Junior Division in 1968 under the name Norths Aspley, and was formed the previous year following a meeting of locals interested in establishing a rugby league club in Aspley. In the club's first season it fielded four teams, with the Under-13s winning the Premiership. Due to the lack of poker machines in Queensland at the time, funds were acquired through Bingo games, chocolate wheels and raffles. The raffles were organised by Harry Kirby, an advisor from Norths who oversaw the setting up of the new club and decided to stay. Aspley's traditional home, Kirby Park, which was acquired in 1969 under a 25 lease, was named after Harry Kirby. Today Aspley Leagues Club is the largest junior rugby league side within the Junior Brisbane Rugby League Competition, with over 30 teams and more than 500 registered players.

=== 2006 and 2007 ===
In 2006 the Aspley Devils successfully applied for, and entered, the FOGS Cup and FOGS Colts Challenge, seeing it as stepping stone to the vacant 12th spot in Queensland Cup. In December 2006 it was announced that Aspley would replace the Toowoomba Clydesdales in the Queensland Cup, and compete as the Aspley Broncos. They will play in the Aspley colours of teal, maroon and gold, and be coached by Mark Gee.

== See also ==
- Rugby league in Queensland
