= Steven Michaels =

Australian rugby league footballer

Steve Michaels
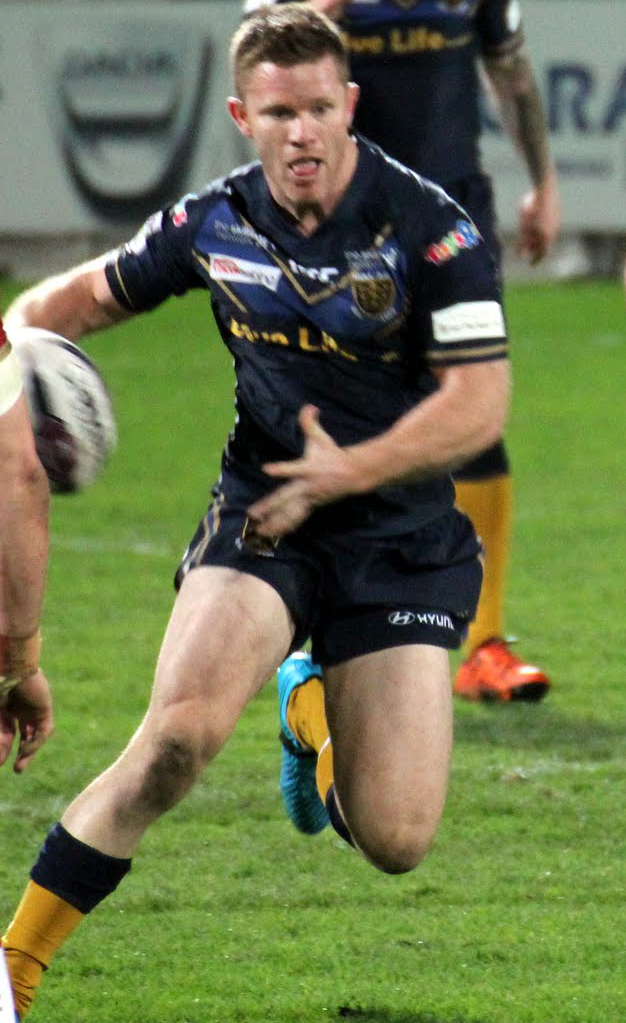

Personal information
- Full name: Steven Michael Michaels
- Born: 13 January 1987 (age 39) Southport, Queensland, Australia

Playing information
- Height: 181 cm (5 ft 11 in)
- Weight: 88 kg (13 st 12 lb)
- Position: Wing, Centre
Club
Years	Team	Pld	T	G	FG	P
2005–09	Brisbane Broncos	60	22	0	0	88
2010–14	Gold Coast Titans	60	23	0	0	92
2015–17	Hull F.C.	77	31	0	0	124
2015(DR)	→ Doncaster	1	0	0	0	0
	Total	198	76	0	0	304
Representative
Years	Team	Pld	T	G	FG	P
2010	Queensland Residents	1	0	0	0	0

Steven Michael Michaels (born 13 January 1987) is an Australian professional rugby league footballer who played in the 2000s and 2010s. He's played in the National Rugby League (NRL) and the Super League. His usual position was as a wing but he also played centre. Michaels previously played for Hull FC, the Brisbane Broncos, and the Gold Coast Titans.

== Background ==
Son of Ralph Michaels, a centre for Brisbane Norths in the 1970s, Steve Michaels played for the Australian Schoolboys team in 2004 while attending Palm Beach Currumbin Secondary High School.

== Professional playing career ==
=== Brisbane Broncos ===
In 2006, he broke into first grade, but then fractured his ankle and had to spend over three months on the sideline. He returned to play in the Queensland Cup, then played in the State League decider. As 2006 NRL Premiers, the Brisbane Broncos travelled to Britain to face 2006 Super League champions, St. Helens in the 2007 World Club Challenge. Michaels played on the wing in the Broncos' 14–18 loss.

Michaels played in every minute of every game for the 2007 season, and his good form was rewarded when he was selected to play in the Prime Minister's XIII against Papua New Guinea at the end of the season. But Michaels pulled out of the game when he had, what was suspected to be pneumonia.

He was hoping to gain a slot in the centres for 2008 and did so, but in round 7 suffered a season-ending knee injury. He made his return in round one of the 2009 NRL season. He partners with Antonio Winterstein on the left flank.

In April 2009, he was named in the preliminary 25 man squad to represent Queensland in the opening State of Origin match for 2009.

=== Gold Coast Titans ===
In May 2010, Michaels was released from the Brisbane Broncos so he could join local rivals, the Gold Coast Titans on a deal until 2012.

In his first year at the Gold Coast, Michaels was part of the Gold Coast side which reached the 2010 preliminary final against the Sydney Roosters but were defeated 32–6 at Suncorp Stadium. The following year, Michaels played 23 games and scored 9 tries as the Gold Coast finished last on the table and claimed the wooden spoon.

On 5 September 2014, Michaels signed with Hull F.C. on a one-year deal starting from 2015.

Michaels was named in an ongoing investigation into players and ex-players supplying cocaine.

=== Hull F.C. ===
In 2015, Michaels joined English side Hull F.C.

He played in the 2016 Challenge Cup Final victory over the Warrington Wolves at Wembley Stadium.

He played with the club until the end of the 2017 season before retiring.

=== Statistics ===
Season	Club	Pld	T	G	FG	P
2005	Brisbane Broncos	3	2	0	0	8
2006	Brisbane Broncos	4	1	0	0	4
2007	Brisbane Broncos	25	10	0	0	40
2008	Brisbane Broncos	7	1	0	0	4
2009	Brisbane Broncos	19	8	0	0	32
2010	Brisbane Broncos	10	4	0	0	16
2011	Gold Coast Titans	23	10	0	0	40
2012	Gold Coast Titans	17	8	0	0	32
2013	Gold Coast Titans	9	2	0	0	8
2014	Gold Coast Titans	2	0	0	0	0
2015	Hull FC	26	8	0	0	32
2016	Hull FC	29	13	0	0	52
2017	Hull FC	23	10	0	0	40
	Totals:	197	76	0	0	304
