= Alwyn Simpson =

Australian rugby league footballer

Personal information
- Born: 12 May 1984 (age 42)
- Height: 187 cm (6 ft 2 in)
- Weight: 88 kg (13 st 12 lb)

Playing information
- Position: Wing
Club
Years	Team	Pld	T	G	FG	P
2007	Brisbane Broncos	1	0	0	0	0
- As of 20 October 2015

Alwyn Simpson (born 12 May 1984) is former professional rugby league player who played for the Brisbane Broncos. His only first-grade appearance came in Brisbane's qualifying final loss to the Melbourne Storm at Olympic Park in 2007. He played on a wing, playing one week after playing for Redcliffe in the Queensland Cup grand final. This appearance occurred a year after sustaining a serious leg injury after being hit by a motorist.
