= Rory Bromley =

Australian rugby league footballer

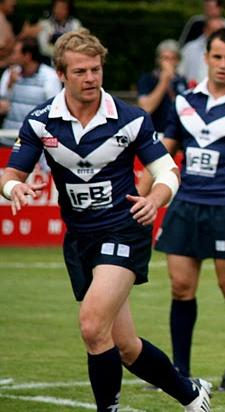

Personal information
- Born: 1 May 1984 (age 40); Australia
- Height: 1.81 m (5 ft 11 in)
- Weight: 87 kg (13 st 10 lb)

Playing information
- Position: Full-back
Club
| Years | Team | Pld | T | G | FG | P |
|---|---|---|---|---|---|---|
| 2004 | Central Comets |
| 2006–08 | Redcliffe Dolphins | 39 | 25 | 0 | 0 | 100 |
| 2009 | Toulouse Olympique | 18 | 12 | | | 48 |
| | Total | 57 | 37 | 0 | 0 | 148 |
- Source: As of 15 January 2010

Rory Bromley is a professional rugby league footballer for the Toulouse Olympique team in the Co-operative Championship. He was formerly a player with the Redcliffe Dolphins in the Queensland Cup. His team position is full back.

He ended his first season at the Toulouse Olympique in 2009 as the leading try scorer for the squad with the same number of tries as the centre, Damien Couturier, for 18 matches played (versus 20 for Couturier).
