= Roy Friend =

Australian rugby league footballer

Personal information
- Full name: Roy Friend
- Born: 16 May 1982 (age 44)

Playing information
- Position: Prop
Club
Years	Team	Pld	T	G	FG	P
2003	Cronulla Sharks	6	1	0	0	4
- Source: As of 23 May 2020

Roy Friend (born 16 May 1982) is a former professional rugby league player who played six games for the Cronulla-Sutherland Sharks.

== NRL career ==
Friend made his rugby league debut for Cronulla in 2003. His first and only try came in the Shark’s round 26 loss to the Canterbury-Bankstown Bulldogs. During that game he was also reprimanded by Cronulla captain Brett Kimmorley for backtalk.

== Post-NRL career ==
After his stint in the NRL, Friend was playing with the Tweed Heads Seagulls as of 2008.
