= Alex Glenn =

Cook Islands and New Zealand international rugby league footballer

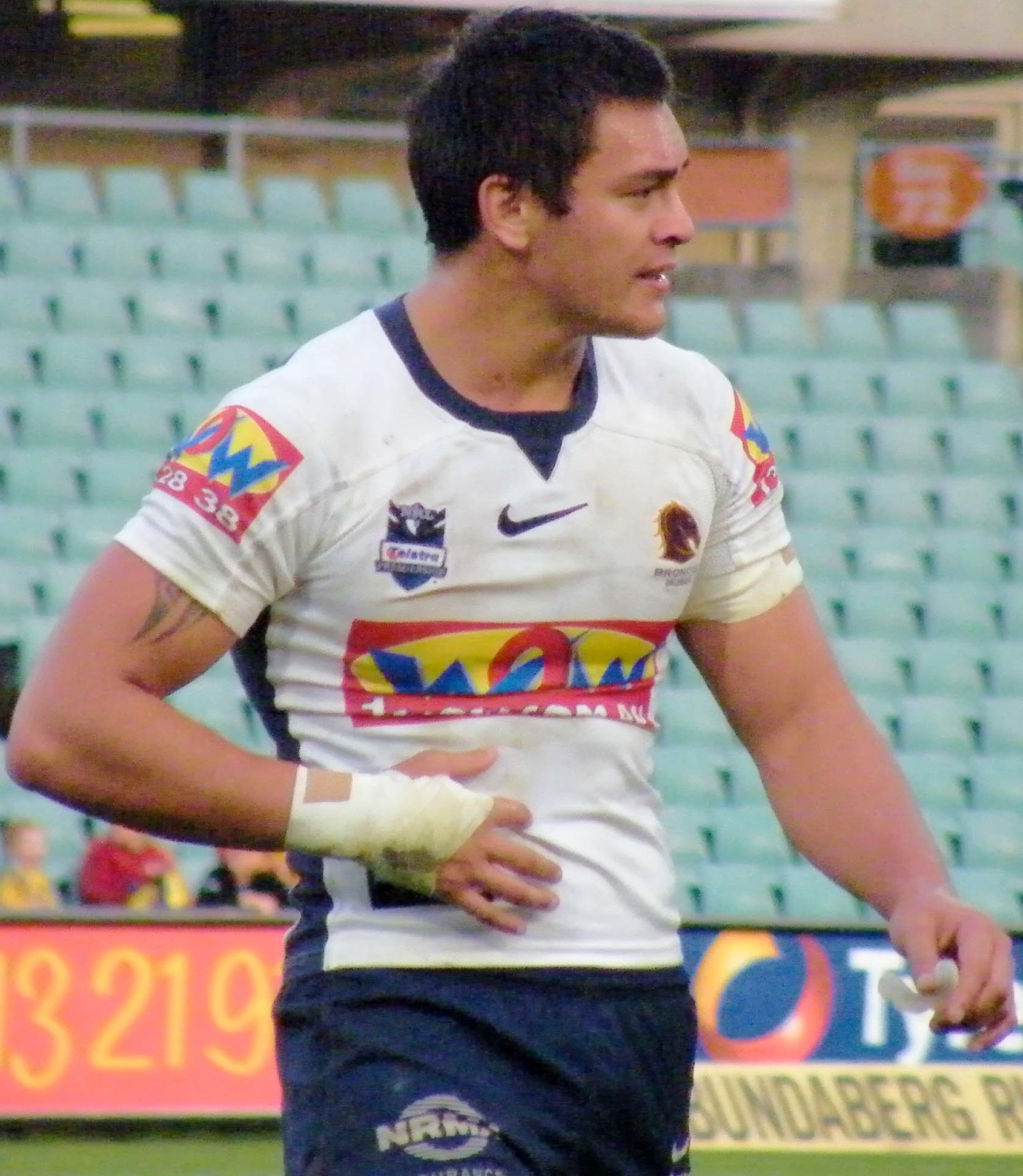

Personal information
- Born: 31 July 1988 (age 38) Auckland, New Zealand

Playing information
- Height: 181 cm (5 ft 11 in)
- Weight: 92 kg (14 st 7 lb)
- Position: Second-row, Centre
Club
Years	Team	Pld	T	G	FG	P
2009–21	Brisbane Broncos	288	58	0	0	232
Representative
Years	Team	Pld	T	G	FG	P
2011–15	New Zealand	12	0	0	0	0
2017–24	Cook Islands	3	1	0	0	4

Alex Glenn (born 31 July 1988) is a former professional rugby league footballer who captained and played as a second-row and centre for the Brisbane Broncos in the NRL. He played for both the Cook Islands and New Zealand at international level.

Glenn also played as a winger, lock and hooker in his career.

== Background ==
Glenn was born in Auckland, New Zealand, and is of Cook Islands descent.

Glenn played his junior rugby league with the Northcote Tigers before moving to the Gold Coast as a 14-year-old and played for the Burleigh Bears. In 2007, Glenn was named in the Australian under 20s national touch football development squad, having represented at a national level throughout his teens, Glenn was also selected for U19 Qld State of Origin side but declined both opportunities to represent New Zealand in the future. In 2005 & 2006 he won the senior sportsperson of the year award at Miami State High School on the Gold Coast. Glenn played for the Junior Kiwis in their victory over the Junior Kangaroos in Wellington in 2007. Glenn captained the Brisbane Broncos NYC team in 2008. On 5 October 2008, Glenn captained the Broncos in the 2008 NYC Grand Final against the Canberra Raiders, starting at lock in their 28-24 golden point extra time loss. Alex is engaged to Jemma Morgan, who he has three children with.

== Playing career ==
=== 2009 ===
Since moving up to first grade, Glenn has become a utility for the Broncos, Glenn made first grade debut for the Brisbane Broncos in Round 1 of the 2009 NRL season against the North Queensland Cowboys playing off the interchange bench in the Broncos 19–18 win at Suncorp Stadium. In Round 3 against the New Zealand Warriors, Glenn scored his first NRL career try in the Broncos 26–10 win at Mt Smart Stadium. Glenn finished his NRL debut year in the 2009 NRL season with him playing in 26 matches and scoring 6 tries. Glenn was part of the Cook Islands squad for the 2009 Pacific Cup, although he pulled out due to injury.

=== 2010 ===
Glenn played most of 2010 season in the centre position covering Justin Hodges who was injured for the season. Glenn finished off the Broncos 2010 NRL season with him playing in 22 matches and scoring 2 tries. In 2010, Glenn was selected in the test squad for New Zealand to play against Australia, however he was named as 18th man and did not play in the test.

=== 2011 ===
In Round 14 against the Canberra Raiders, Glenn became the youngest ever Brisbane Broncos captain, aged 22 in the absence of Darren Lockyer. Glenn scored a try in the Broncos 25-24 golden point extra time win at Suncorp Stadium. Glenn finished off the 2011 NRL season with him playing in all the Broncos in 27 matches and scoring 9 tries. On 16 October 2011, Glenn made his international debut for the New Zealand in the post-season test game against Australia, starting at second-row in the Kiwis 42–6 loss at Hunter Stadium. Glenn also travelled to England with the Kiwis for the 2011 Four Nations tournament, playing in 3 matches.

=== 2012 ===
On 18 January 2012, Glenn extended his contract with the Broncos for further 3 years, keeping at the club until the end of the 2015 season. In April 2012, Glenn was selected in the New Zealand team to play against Australia in the 2012 ANZAC Test at Eden Park in Auckland, starting from the interchange bench in the Kiwis 20–12 loss. Glenn had an outstanding 2012 NRL season by scoring 13 tries in 23 matches for the Broncos. The most number of tries scored by a forward in 2012. Glenn captained the Broncos in 3 matches while regular captain Sam Thaiday was on origin duty. Glenn played in the October 2012 test match against the Australia in New Zealand's 20–12 loss at 1300SMILES Stadium.

=== 2013 ===
In Round 2 against the St George Illawarra Dragons, Glenn played his 100th NRL career match in the Broncos 22–6 win at WIN Stadium. In April 2013, Glenn was selected in the New Zealand team to play against Australia in the 2013 ANZAC Test at Canberra Stadium. Glenn was originally selected on the interchange bench, but hours before the test game started, NZ captain Simon Mannering was ruled out of the game with a calf injury and Glenn was then named at lock, while Tohu Harris comes into the team to fill his bench position in the Kiwis 32–12 loss. Glenn finished off the Broncos 2011 NRL season with him playing in 20 matches and scoring 2 tries. Glenn later represented New Zealand in the 2013 Rugby League World Cup.

=== 2014 ===
In February 2014, Glenn was selected in the Broncos runners-up inaugural 2014 Auckland Nines squad. Glenn finished the 2014 NRL season with him playing in all of the Broncos 25 matches and scoring 5 tries. On 16 September 2014, Glenn was named in the New Zealand national rugby league team 2014 Four Nations train-on squad but later wasn't named in the final 24-man squad.

=== 2015 ===
On 21 January 2015, Glenn was named in the Broncos 2015 NRL Auckland Nines squad. In Round 7 against the St George Illawarra Dragons, Glenn played his 150th NRL career match in the Broncos 12–10 loss at Jubilee Oval. On 19 August 2015, Glenn re-signed with the Broncos on a 2-year deal, to the end of the 2017 season. On 4 October 2015, in the Broncos Queensland derby 2015 NRL Grand Final against the North Queensland Cowboys, Glenn played at second-row in the Broncos historic golden point 17–16 loss. Glenn finished the 2015 NRL season with him playing in 26 matches and scoring 4 tries for the Broncos. On 8 October 2015, Glenn was selected in the 23-man New Zealand squad to tour England. Glenn was one of four members of Brisbane's grand final team to be included in coach Stephen Kearney's squad for the three-test tour. Glenn played in 3 matches during the tour.

=== 2016 ===
On 1 February 2016, Glenn was named in the Broncos 2016 Auckland Nines squad. On 1 May 2016, Glenn was added to the New Zealand national rugby league team 19-man squad for the 2016 ANZAC Test but was ruled out due to a calf injury. Glenn finished the 2016 NRL season with him playing in 23 matches and scoring 4 tries for the Broncos. On 21 September 2016, Glenn was added to the New Zealand national rugby league team train-on squad for the 2016 Four Nations. Unfortunately for Glenn a week later, he was ruled out of the tournament due to him having surgery on his shoulder.

=== 2017 ===
In Round 9 against the Penrith Panthers, Glenn played his 200th NRL career match in the Broncos 32–18 win at Suncorp Stadium. On 6 May 2017, Glenn captained the Cook Islands against Papua New Guinea in the 2017 Pacific Cup, starting at second-row in the 32–22 loss at Campbelltown Stadium. On 28 June 2017, Glenn agreed to extended his contract with the Broncos to the end of the 2019 season. Glenn finished the 2017 NRL season with him playing in all of the Broncos 27 matches and scoring 5 tries.

=== 2018 ===
Glenn finished the 2018 NRL season with him playing in 20 matches and scoring 4 tries for the Broncos. In November 2018, it was rumoured that Glenn was going to get a release from his contract from the Broncos to join the Gold Coast Titans because of the club trying to retain Matt Lodge and Tevita Pangai Junior.

=== 2019 ===
On 10 October, Glenn was named in the Cook Islands squad for the 2019 Rugby League World Cup 9s. On 16 November Glenn again was named captain of the Cook Islands in their World Cup qualifier against the United States in which they won 38–16 with Glenn also scoring a try and the Kukis securing the 16th and final spot at the 2021 Rugby league world cup.

=== 2020 ===
On 24 January, Glenn was named Brisbane Broncos captain.

Glenn made only eight appearances for Brisbane in the 2020 NRL season as the club finished last for the first time in their history and claimed the wooden spoon.

=== 2021 ===
Glenn retained captaincy of the Brisbane Broncos for the 2021 NRL season.

He made 18 appearances for the club. He scored his first try of the season in the 28 - 16 win against the Cronulla Sharks. He scored his last ever NRL try against the North Queensland Cowboys, in the 37 - 18 win. Glenn announced his retirement on the 19th of August, having played 282 games for the Brisbane Broncos. He finished his NRL career with a win, a 35 - 22 upset win against the Newcastle Knights in round 25 of the 2021 NRL season.

== Post playing ==
In 2024, Glenn worked as part of the coaching staff for the Cook Islands squad and he came out of retirement to play Papua New Guinea.

== NRL statistics ==
Year	Team	Matches	Tries	Goals	F/G	Points
2009	Brisbane Broncos	26	6	-	-	24
2010	Brisbane Broncos	22	2	-	-	8
2011	Brisbane Broncos	27	9	-	-	36
2012	Brisbane Broncos	23	13	-	-	52
2013	Brisbane Broncos	20	2	-	-	8
2014	Brisbane Broncos	25	5	-	-	20
2015	Brisbane Broncos	25	4	-	-	16
2016	Brisbane Broncos	23	4	-	-	16
2017	Brisbane Broncos	27	5	-	-	20
2018	Brisbane Broncos	20	4	-	-	16
2019	Brisbane Broncos	21	2	-	-	8
2020	Brisbane Broncos	8	0	-	-	0
2021	Brisbane Broncos	18	2	-	-	8
Total		285	58	-	-	232
