= Tom Hewitt (rugby league) =

Australian rugby league footballer

Personal information
- Full name: Thomas Hewitt
- Born: 1 October 1985 (age 39); Theodore, Queensland, Australia

Playing information
- Height: 185 cm (6 ft 1 in)
- Weight: 82 kg (12 st 13 lb; 181 lb)
- Position: Wing
Club
Years	Team	Pld	T	G	FG	P
2007	St. George Illawarra	5	4	0	0	20

Tom Hewitt (born 1 October 1985) is an Australian former professional rugby league footballer who played in the NRL competition for the St George Illawarra Dragons. Hewitt's position of choice was as a wing, but he could also operate as a fullback.

== Playing career ==
Hewitt made his first grade debut in round 14, 2007 with the St George Illawarra Dragons against the Parramatta Eels with Parramatta snatching a 20–12 win and Hewitt scoring a try.

Hewitt revealed on 8 August 2007, that he had signed with the Brisbane Broncos for the 2008 season but made no appearances for the club.
