= David Stagg =

Australian rugby league footballer

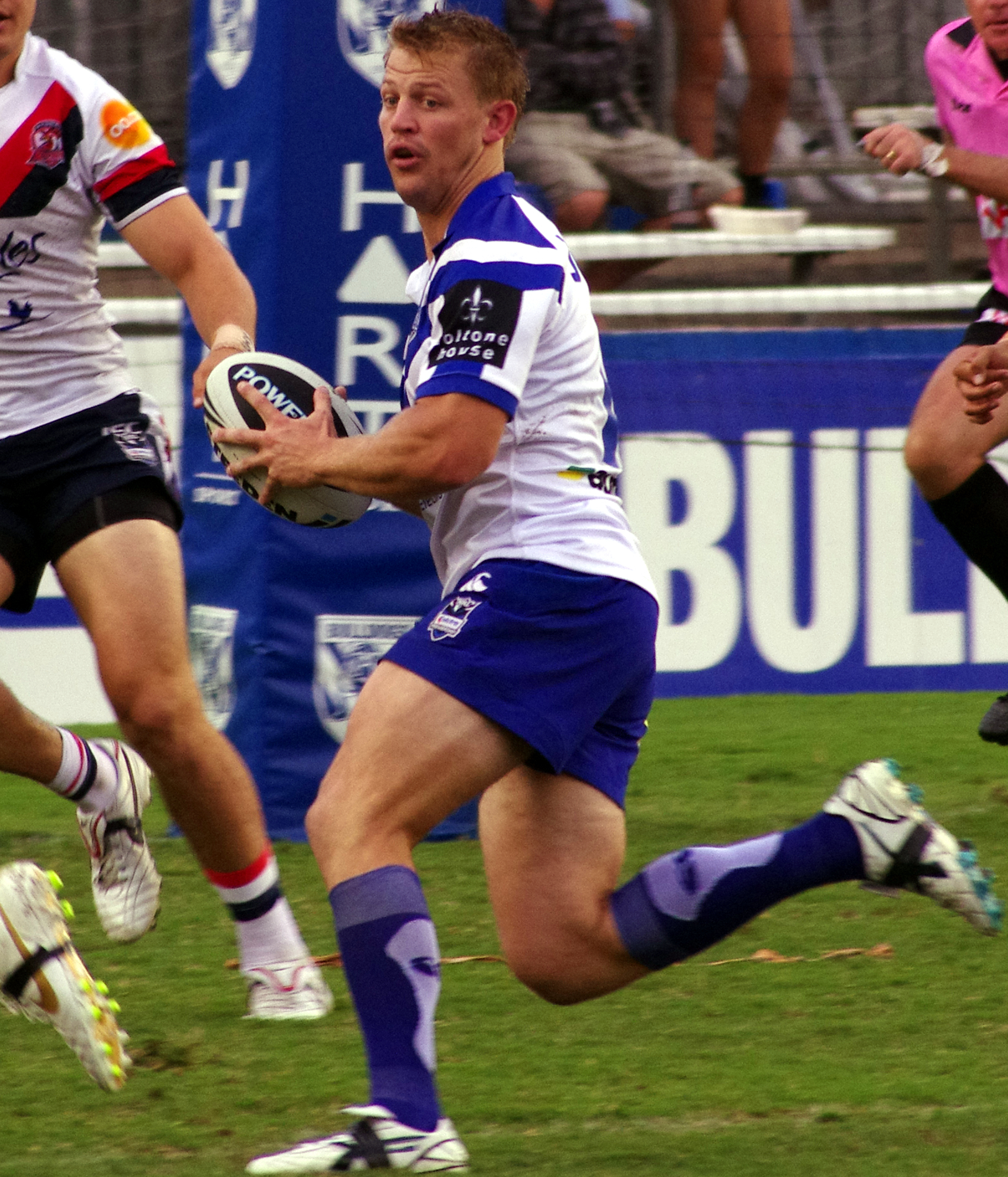

Personal information
- Born: 18 October 1983 (age 43) Townsville, Queensland, Australia

Playing information
- Height: 183 cm (6 ft 0 in)
- Weight: 100 kg (15 st 10 lb)
- Position: Lock, Second-row, Centre, Five-eighth
Club
Years	Team	Pld	T	G	FG	P
2003–08	Brisbane Broncos	92	17	0	0	68
2009–12	Canterbury Bulldogs	94	8	0	0	32
2013–15	Brisbane Broncos	20	1	0	0	4
	Total	206	26	0	0	104
Representative
Years	Team	Pld	T	G	FG	P
2006	Queensland	1	0	0	0	0

David Stagg (born 18 October 1983, in Townsville, Queensland) is an Australian former professional rugby league footballer. He made one appearance for the Queensland State of Origin side and played for the Brisbane Broncos, with whom he won the 2006 NRL Premiership, and the Canterbury-Bankstown Bulldogs. He was known for his high workload and played as a lock and second-row, but could also fill in at centre.

== Career ==
Stagg played his junior football for Norms TRL before joining the Brisbane Broncos. He made his NRL debut in round 18 of the 2003 NRL season against the Canterbury-Bankstown Bulldogs.

In 2004, Stagg set a new record for tackles in a game, with 64 tackles made against the Cronulla-Sutherland Sharks, this record has since been beaten.

In 2006, Stagg made his representative debut, and played only one game for Queensland in State of Origin before being dropped. Later that year he played at centre in the Broncos 2006 NRL Grand Final victory. After winning the grand final with the Broncos, Stagg signed a two-year deal with the Canterbury-Bankstown Bulldogs.

In his first season at Canterbury, Stagg played 24 games as the club finished second on the table during the regular season. Stagg played for Canterbury in their preliminary final defeat against arch rivals Parramatta at Telstra Stadium.

In 2010, he extended his contract with Canterbury-Bankstown until the end of 2012. In the 2012 NRL season, Stagg played 27 games as Canterbury won the Minor Premiership and reached the 2012 NRL Grand Final. Stagg played in Canterbury's 14–4 loss against Melbourne at ANZ Stadium.

Stagg rejoined the Brisbane Broncos in 2013 on a two-year deal, he would go on to play 14 games for the club in the 2013 NRL season. In the early rounds of the 2014 NRL season, Stagg suffered a serious knee injury, ruling him out for the season before retiring at the end of the 2015 NRL season.

== Personal life ==
During the 2007/2008 off season Stagg married his then girlfriend, Temika Sellars. The couple have 2 children.
