= Shane Perry =

Australian rugby league footballer

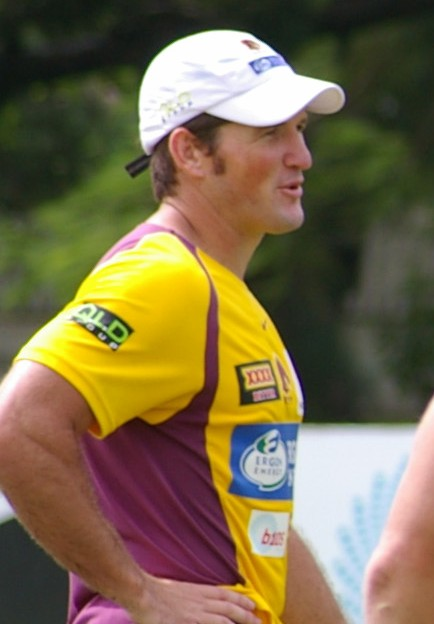
- Perry in 2006

Personal information
- Full name: Shane Perry
- Born: 9 November 1976 (age 49) Brisbane, Queensland, Australia

Playing information
- Height: 176 cm (5 ft 9 in)
- Weight: 84 kg (13 st 3 lb)
- Position: Halfback, Five-eighth
Club
Years	Team	Pld	T	G	FG	P
1999	Western Suburbs	8	1	2	0	8
2000–01	Canterbury Bulldogs	6	1	0	0	4
2006–08	Brisbane Broncos	43	4	0	0	16
2009	Catalans Dragons	16	1	0	0	4
	Total	73	7	2	0	32

Shane Perry (born 9 November 1977) is an Australian former professional rugby league footballer who played in the 2000s whose usual position was halfback. He played in the National Rugby League for the Western Suburbs Magpies, Canterbury-Bankstown and the Brisbane Broncos (with whom he won the 2006 premiership), as well as in the Super League for French club Catalans Dragons.

== Playing career ==
Perry was part of the Queensland Cup playing for the Logan Scorpions in 1998, winning the Rothmans medal for best and fairest player that year.

Perry started out his first-grade rugby league career with Western Suburbs in 1999 and played in the club's last ever game as a first grade side which was a 60–16 loss against the Auckland Warriors at Campbelltown Stadium.

Perry then joined Canterbury-Bankstown and played with the club for two seasons.

He then played for the Queensland Cup team Redcliffe Dolphins, winning their player of the year award in 2002 and also captaining the side in 2005.

Perry was then brought into the Brisbane Broncos camp/squad to provide cover during the State of Origin period where the Broncos are traditionally hit hardest with extra playing duties and/or injuries. Perry became the number one halfback, when team-mate Brett Seymour had his contract with the club terminated for disciplinary reasons. Perry's ability to complement captain Darren Lockyer on-field relieved some pressure from the captain. Perry's form continued to improve and he played at half-back in the Broncos' 2006 NRL Grand Final victory.

As 2006 NRL Premiers, the Brisbane Broncos travelled to England to face 2006 Super League champions, St Helens R.F.C. in the 2007 World Club Challenge. Perry played at halfback in the Broncos' 14–18 loss.

After mixed years in 2007 and 2008, he signed with French Super League team Catalans Dragons for the 2009 season.

Perry was one of the few NRL players that mixed a rugby league career with a job.

He scored 60 tries and a total of 261 points for the Redcliffe Dolphins in the Queensland Cup. Perry also played for Norths Devils of the Queensland Cup.
