= Palmer Wapau =

Australian rugby league footballer

Personal information
- Full name: Palmer Wapau
- Born: 16 January 1983 (age 43) Brisbane, Queensland, Australia
- Height: 182 cm (6 ft 0 in)
- Weight: 108 kg (17 st 0 lb)

Playing information
- Position: Second-row
Club
Years	Team	Pld	T	G	FG	P
2009	Brisbane Broncos	5	0	0	0	0
- Source: NRL Stats As of 26 June 2009

Palmer Wapau (born 16 January 1983) is a former professional rugby league footballer who played in the 2000s. He played for the Brisbane Broncos in the National Rugby League. He played five-eighth, second row and prop.

== Early life ==
Wapau was educated at St. Teresa's College, Abergowrie.

== Playing career ==
A talented forward, Wapau showed his skill by playing five-eighth in the Queensland Cup in 2007 where a bad ankle injury hampered his NRL progress. He made his NRL debut in round 7 of the 2009 NRL season against the Parramatta Eels. He was a replacement player for Broncos Prop David Taylor.

School mate and former North Queensland player Matt Bowen said that Palmer was the best player that has not played in the NRL prior to his debut in 2009 for Brisbane. His final game in the NRL was against Cronulla-Sutherland which ended in a 46–12 loss at Shark Park.
