= Joel Clinton =

Australia international rugby league footballer

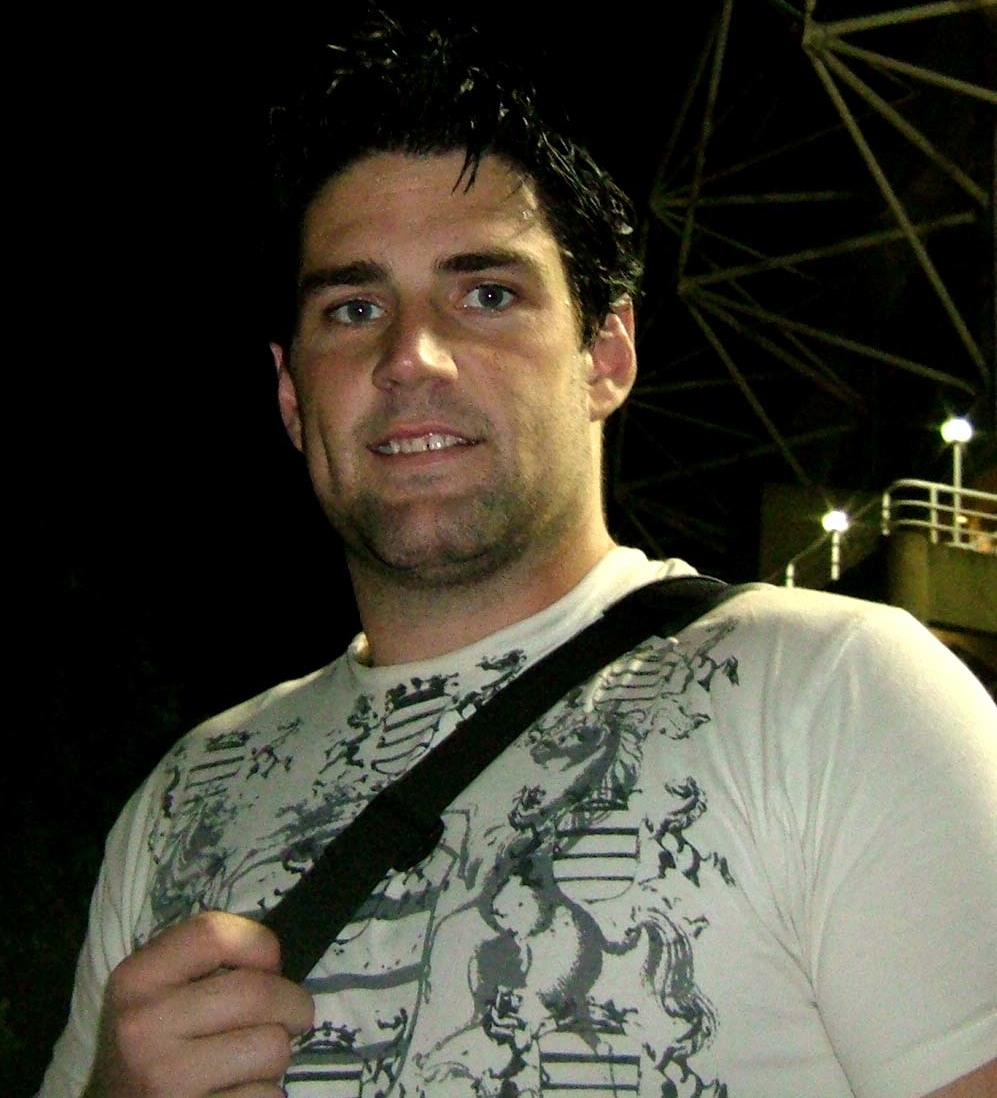

Personal information
- Born: 8 December 1981 (age 44) Riverstone, New South Wales, Australia

Playing information
- Height: 190 cm (6 ft 3 in)
- Weight: 105 kg (16 st 7 lb)
- Position: Prop
Club
Years	Team	Pld	T	G	FG	P
2002–07	Penrith Panthers	137	5	0	0	20
2008–09	Brisbane Broncos	45	3	0	0	12
2010–12	Hull Kingston Rovers	59	2	0	0	8
	Total	241	10	0	0	40
Representative
Years	Team	Pld	T	G	FG	P
2003–06	City NSW	3	0	0	0	0
2004	Australia	1	0	0	0	0

Joel Clinton (born 8 December 1981) is an Australian former professional rugby league footballer who played as a prop in the 2000s and 2010s. An Australia international representative, he played his club football in the NRL for the Penrith Panthers (with whom he won the 2003 premiership) and the Brisbane Broncos. He also played for English club Hull Kingston Rovers in the Super League.

== Background ==
Joel Clinton was born in Riverstone, New South Wales on 8 December 1981. He played for the Parramatta Eels, before joining the Penrith club.

== Professional playing career ==
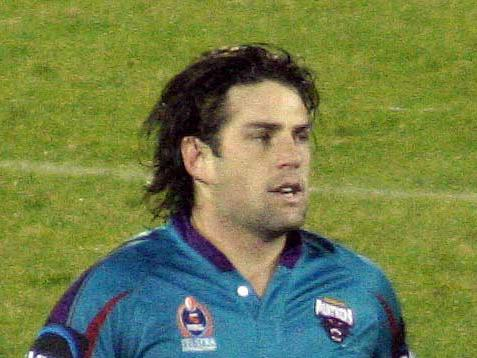
Clinton playing for the Panthers in 2006

Clinton rose to prominence in the Panthers Panthers' successful 2003 season, he helped the Penrith club come from last place in 2001 to become Minor Premiers and eventual victory in the 2003 NRL Grand final. At the end of the 2003 NRL season, he went on the 2003 Kangaroo tour of Great Britain and France, helping Australia to victory over Great Britain in what would be the last time the two nations contested an Ashes series. He described the experience as "a great personal bonus but it did not compare to winning the premiership with the guys you train and play with all year long." As 2003 NRL premiers, the Panthers travelled to England to face Super League VIII champions, the Bradford Bulls in the 2004 World Club Challenge. Clinton played at prop forward in the Panthers' 22–4 loss.

Clinton's good form continued into 2004 and he was selected in the Australian team that took on the Kiwis in the 2004 ANZAC Test.

=== 2006 season ===
The Panther's first loss of the 2006 season came against the Canberra Raiders, a close, golden-point match. During the game, Clinton was hit by a high tackle from Canberra Raiders hooker Simon Woolford. Clinton received a black eye, but got up off the ground smiling, and continued playing. Clinton's ability to brush off the hit left Woolford claiming the high tackle wasn't that serious. These comments left Clinton steaming, saying "Woolford should learn to keep his mouth shut." In May 2006, Clinton was selected to trial for the New South Wales State of Origin team in the Country v. City game. Clinton played for City and commented before the game that he intended to "smash his way into the NSW side." Clinton saved a try in the first 20 minutes, diving on a cross-kick into the in-goal by Country. City eventually lost by 2 points, conceding tries while Clinton was off the field.

Joel Clinton hits the Warriors' line in Round 21 of the 2006 season

Manly five-eighth Travis Burns branded Joel Clinton as "childish" and a "bad sport" for allegedly squirting him with a water bottle while lining up a match-winning penalty goal in round 20 (23 July 2006). Viewing the replay, it appears that Clinton was standing over 10 metres away from Burns, leading Coach John Lang to comment "it must've been a bloody big squirt".

==== 'That Tackle' ====
In round 19, 15 July 2006, Clinton made international headlines with a tackle on Ty Williams of the North Queensland Cowboys. With the Penrith Panthers ahead 12–8; North Queensland winger Ty Williams broke the Penrith line and headed for a runaway try in the corner. However, Clinton had enough pace and tenacity to pull the Queensland Origin player into touch just centimetres out from the tryline. Considered one of the fastest men in the NRL over one hundred metres, Williams was running for a game-changing four points. Instead, Clinton single-handedly reversed the momentum of the match. This allowed Penrith winger Michael Gordon to score in the final minute, giving Penrith an unlikely 17–8 win.

=== 2007 season ===
==== Pre-season ====
Fresh from the off-season under new coach Matthew Elliott, Clinton said that confidence within Penrith team was high for 2007. "Blokes like me, Trent Waterhouse and Luke Lewis have taken on a leadership role this year," Clinton said. "We used to be the younger generation but we've become senior players ourselves."

Clinton's level of fitness was also at an all-time high, the off-season training trimming Clinton down from 115 kg to 108 kg. "I've never been this fit," Joel said. "I'm feeling unreal. Elliot commented that "(Joel's) training has been nothing short of phenomenal and I'm expecting his performances to follow."

==== Regular season ====
Clinton put the initial Penrith loss to the Cronulla-Sutherland Sharks in round 1 down to the change of coach. "Me and most of the other guys have only known one way for the past five years," Clinton said. "We've got to start to have belief. You've just got to back yourself, me and the boys. If we do that, we'll shake up the comp. I know it's early days to say that, but I think we should go pretty well."

After Penrith's win over Canterbury in round 2, sports journalists were commenting on how important Clinton was to the effort. "He'd primed himself to match the muscle of Canterbury's Mark O'Meley and Willie Mason and produced as good a performance as he's given since 2003, when he made the Australian squad as a young prop."

In round 4, in response to Scott Prince complaining about off-the-ball play, Clinton was interviewed for his personal view on dirty tricks in the NRL: "If stuff happens on the field you leave it on the field. I never take anything off the field. I don't like to go home and whinge about it."

In round 5, Clinton was criticised for the number of penalties he conceded in the game, and season generally. However, Clinton continued to top the work rates in the Penrith side. In round 7, the Penrith club lost to the Canberra Raiders. Clinton said he was disgusted with the team's performance. During the week, a virus spread through the team, affecting Clinton, Luke Priddis, Frank Puletua, Nathan Smith and Craig Gower – who was hospitalised. Despite the virus, Clinton thought it wasn't an excuse for the loss. "There were a couple of crook boys but that's something you just have to deal with," Clinton said.

==== 'That Try' ====
In round 9 the Penrith club broke their five match losing streak against the Cowboys, despite the early loss of halfback play-maker Craig Gower. Clinton also broke his season long try scoring drought. Solely chasing a mediocre kick, the bounce of the ball confused Cowboys winger Brenton Bowen, allowing Clinton to gather and score in the corner. The try pushed momentum in favour of the second-from-the-bottom Panthers and pushed second-placed Cowboys "into despair."NZ Herald - Breaking news, latest news, business, sport and entertainment Clinton's performance in the game earned him the status of a stand out player of Round 9.

"Clinton's effort was one of the few spectacular things to happen in a scrappy game, his athletic pick-up on the fly from a Peter Wallace kick belying the fact he is a front row forward and one of the biggest players in the NRL."

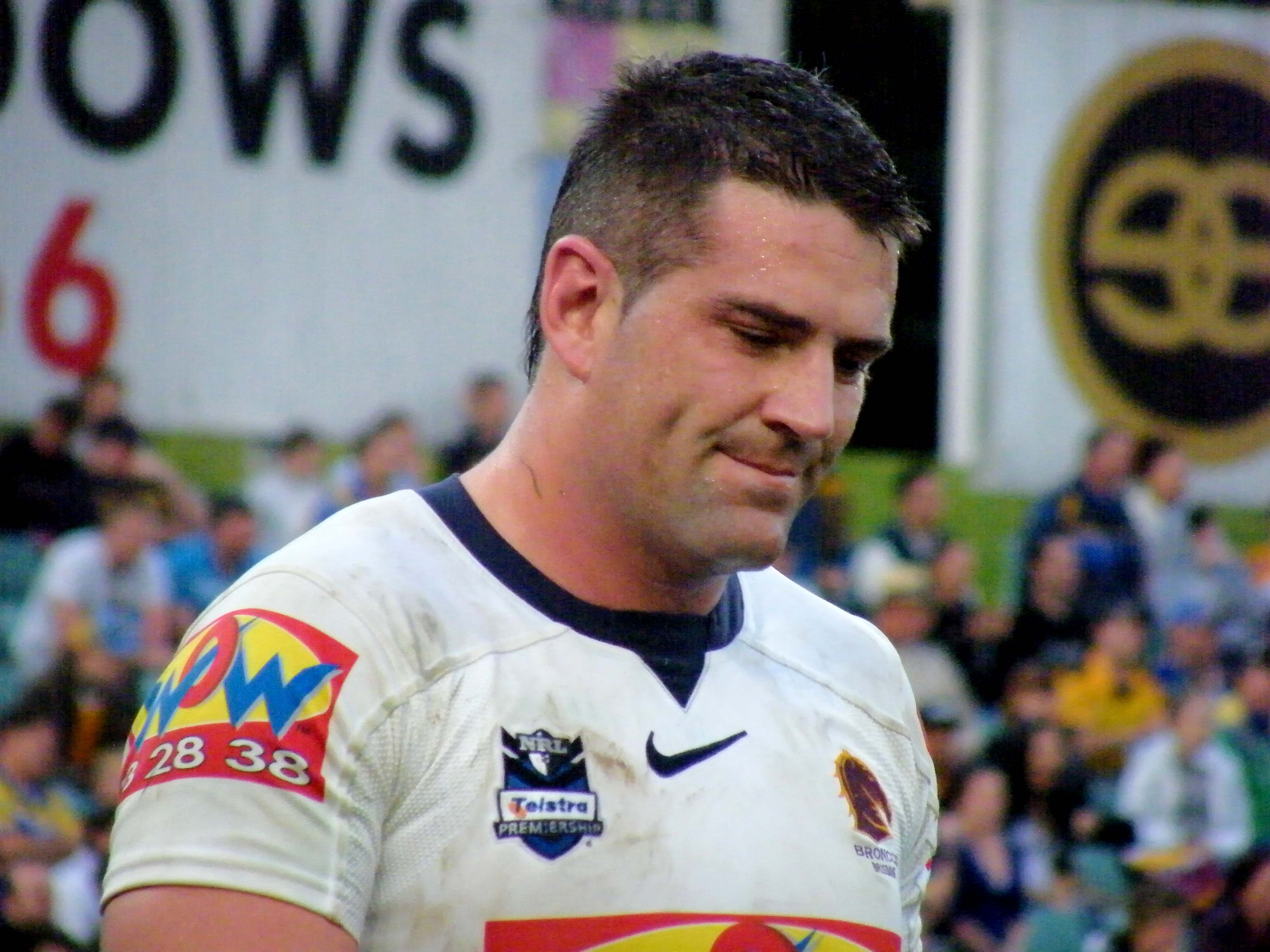
Clinton playing for the Broncos in 2009

=== 2008 Move to Brisbane ===
Clinton came off contract in 2008 – Penrith rhetoric had suggested he would not be renewed at his current salary.Daily Telegraph | We're for Sydney Brisbane Broncos coach Wayne Bennett then met with Clinton in Sydney in May 2007, spiking speculation whether Clinton would join the Broncos for 2008. Negotiations with the Panthers began, FOX SPORTS | Live Sports Scores | NRL, AFL, Cricket Scores with Clinton being offered a three-year contract with both the Panthers and Broncos. On 1 June 2007, it was confirmed that Clinton had signed to the Brisbane Broncos for the 2008 NRL season. There, he is expected to fill the big shoes of retired Shane Webcke.

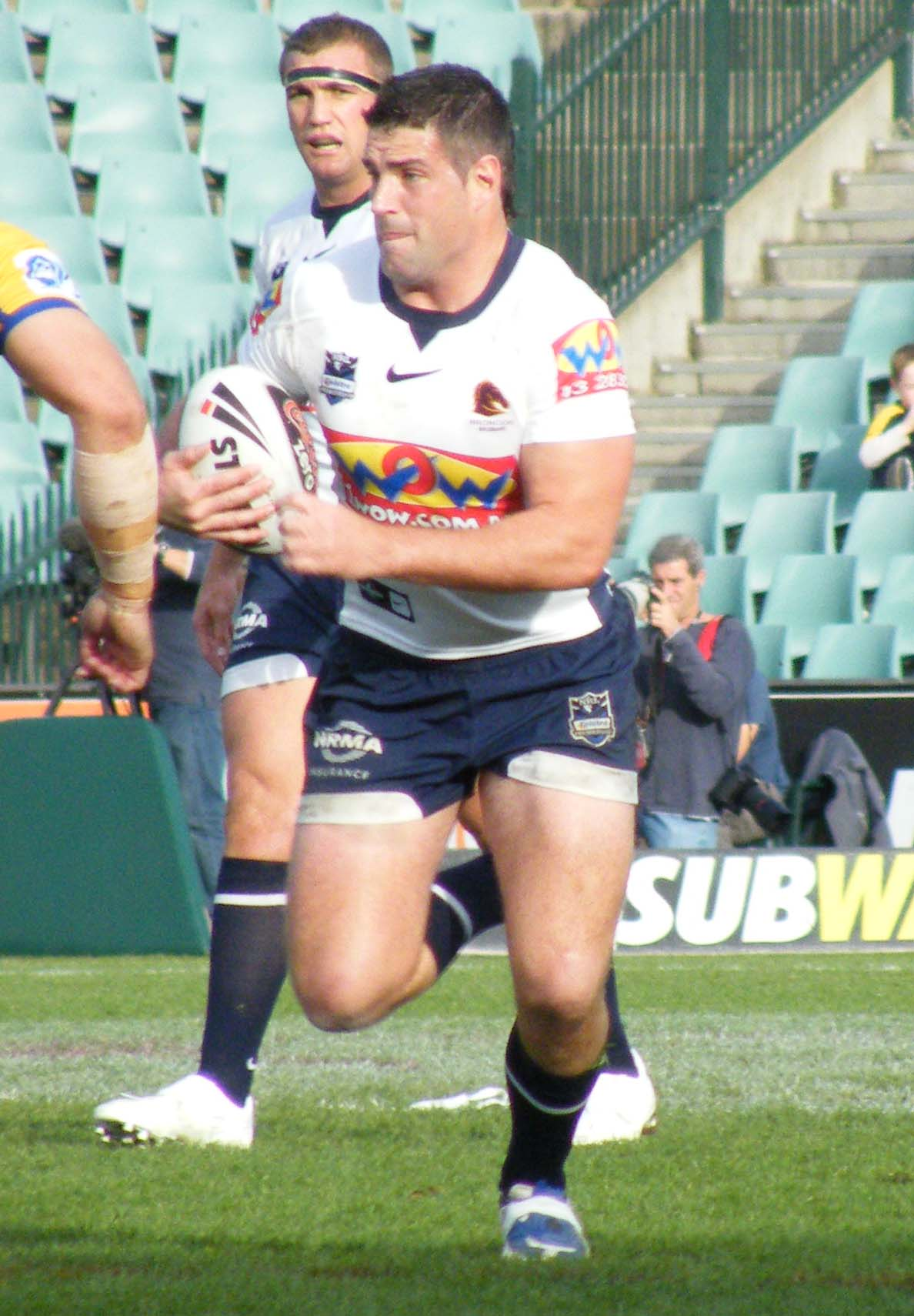
Clinton taking the ball up for Brisbane

Clinton injured his ankle late in the season and missed a few rounds as the Brisbane club headed towards the finals. Clinton returned to the Brisbane side ahead of the finals and played in their qualifying final victory over the Sydney Roosters. Clinton also played in the clubs 16-14 heart breaking loss to Melbourne where Melbourne scored the winning try in the final minute of the match after an Ashton Sims error.

=== 2009 ===
On 9 June, Clinton was fined $50,000 by the Brisbane club for bringing a woman back to his hotel room the night before an NRL match. Brisbane officials met Clinton and handed him the $50,000 fine for a breach of the club's code of conduct. Clinton played a total of 22 games for Brisbane in the 2009 NRL season including their 40-10 preliminary final loss against Melbourne.

=== Hull Kingston Rovers ===
Clinton played for Hull Kingston Rovers between 2010 and 2012. Clinton made a total of 59 appearances for the club scoring two tries.

=== Return to Australia ===
Clinton signed a two-year contract with the Mackay Cutters in the Queensland Cup, beginning in 2013.

== Personal life ==
=== BMX Bandit ===
During their 2003 premiership winning season, Clinton lived with fellow Panther Ben Ross. The two were well known for cycling to training sessions and most local destinations. "We have a race to training most of the time," Ross stated. "I always win," added Clinton. In one incident, Clinton rolled down a set of stairs, tried to brake "the wrong brakes at the front" – locked up his wheels and sent bicycle and 114 kilograms of first grade footballer through a video store window, to the shock and bemusement of the customers.

=== Tattoos ===
After winning the 2003 NRL Premiership, Joel Clinton got a tattoo of a giant snarling panther on his right shoulder, "a reminder of the feats of the past". He also has a tattoo of a phoenix on his right forearm.
