= Nick Emmett =

Australian rugby league footballer

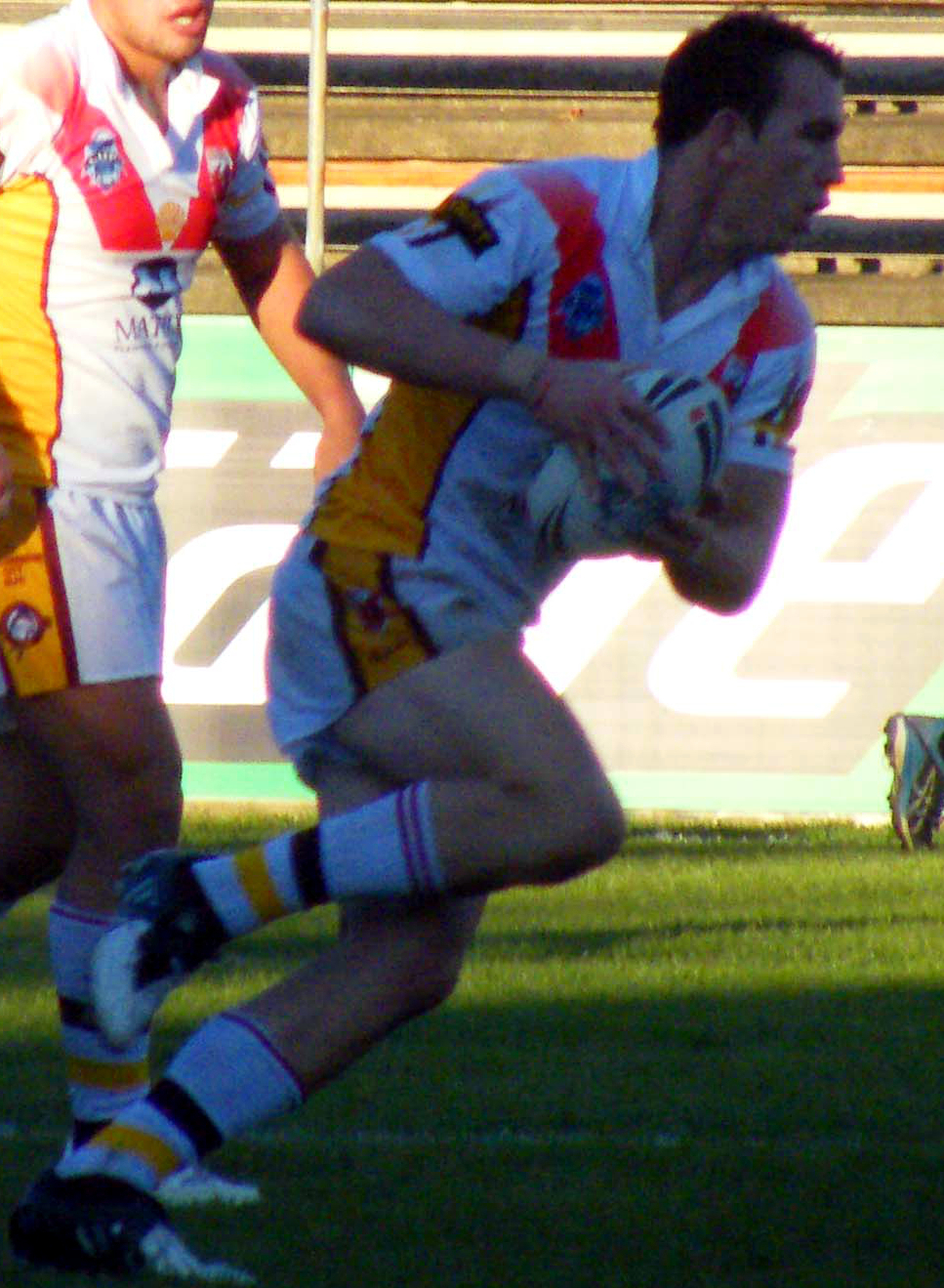

Personal information
- Born: 12 May 1982 (age 44) Grafton, New South Wales, Australia

Playing information
- Height: 188 cm (6 ft 2 in)
- Weight: 96 kg (15 st 2 lb)
- Position: Centre, Second-row
Club
Years	Team	Pld	T	G	FG	P
2006–08	Brisbane Broncos	17	1	0	0	4
2009–10	St. George Illawarra	24	2	0	0	8
	Total	41	3	0	0	12
Representative
Years	Team	Pld	T	G	FG	P
2007	Queensland Residents	1	1	0	0	4

Nick Emmett (born 12 May 1982 in Grafton, New South Wales) is an Australian former professional rugby league footballer who played for the Brisbane Broncos and the St. George Illawarra Dragons in the National Rugby League. He also played for the Redcliffe Dolphins in the Queensland Cup.

== Career ==
Emmett made his NRL debut in Round 17 of the competition in 2006 after the NRL and QRL cleared him to play two days prior to kick-off following a suspension issue playing for feeder team Redcliffe. Emmett was rated as "up to NRL standard" by Wayne Bennett after holding his own in the baby Brisbane Broncos stunning win over Cronulla.

Emmett played for the Broncos again in 2007 during the Origin period and went on to play a handful of first grade games post origin after the Broncos were hit hard by injuries in the latter part of the season. He scored one try in a game against eventual Premiers Melbourne. One of his worst nightmares came when, in the final round of the 2007 season, he dropped the ball with the line wide open against the Parramatta Eels, which the Broncos lost by a then record margin, 68-22.

In a pre-season trial in 2008, Emmett injured his ankle and was sidelined for the early part of the season. He returned to the Broncos team for the game against Cronulla in round 10. He again played through the Origin period. He was also selected on the bench in a couple of games as a utility player, before dislocating his ankle in an awkward tackle in the Broncos round 18 loss to Canterbury. At first it was feared his ankle was broken but X-Rays cleared him of a break. Even so, he was sidelined for the rest of the season.

Emmett was previously signed by the Parramatta Eels and played in the lower-grades for three years before being lured out of semi-retirement and returning to Queensland to play for Redcliffe.

In the 2008 off season, Emmett joined ex-Broncos coach Wayne Bennett at the St. George Illawarra Dragons for the 2009 season and beyond. In round 12 of the 2009 NRL season Emmett scored his first try for the Dragons in their thrashing of the Penrith Panthers 38-10. His try was scored the 79th minute.

However, Nick spent much of 2009 playing for St George Illawarra's feeder club (the Shellharbour Dragons) as a Centre. He was afforded the opportunity to play for St George Illawarra from time to time, mainly during the representative season.

Emmett was contracted to the Dragons through the 2012 season. He was released at the end of the 2012 season.
