= Nick Kenny (rugby league) =

Australian rugby league footballer

Personal information
- Full name: Nick Kenny
- Born: 13 July 1982 (age 44) Rockhampton, Queensland, Australia

Playing information
- Height: 189 cm (6 ft 2 in)
- Weight: 106 kg (16 st 10 lb)
- Position: Prop
Club
Years	Team	Pld	T	G	FG	P
2005–11	Brisbane Broncos	78	3	0	0	12
Representative
Years	Team	Pld	T	G	FG	P
2007	Queensland Residents	1	0	0	0	0

Nick Kenny (born 13 July 1982) is an Australian former professional rugby league footballer who played in the 2000s and 2010s for the Brisbane Broncos club in the National Rugby League competition. He primarily played as a prop-forward.

== Early life ==
Kenny was born in Rockhampton, Queensland. Kenny attended proud rugby league school Emmaus College prior to residing at St Leo's College from 2000 to 2002. His junior rugby league club was Norths Rockhampton Knights.

== Playing career ==
Kenny made his first grade debut for Brisbane in Round 17 2005 against Cronulla-Sutherland. In 2006, Kenny only featured in 1 game and was not part of the premiership winning team. In 2009, Kenny played in Brisbane's 40-10 preliminary final loss against Melbourne.

In late 2011, Kenny retired from rugby league to focus on his physiotherapy career.
