= 2002 Queensland Cup =

- Duration: March 16 – September 21, 2002
- Teams: 12
- Premiers: Redcliffe Dolphins (3rd title)
- Minor premiers: Redcliffe Dolphins (3rd title)
- Matches played: 138
- Points scored: 7,846
- Top points scorer: Damien Richters (246)
- Player of the year: Scott Thorburn (Courier Mail Medal)
- Top try-scorer: Dan Kennedy (34)

The 2002 Queensland Cup season was the 7th season of the top-level statewide rugby league competition run by the Queensland Rugby League in Australia. The competition featured 12 teams playing a 26-week long season (including finals) from March to September.

The Redcliffe Dolphins defeated the Ipswich Jets 34–10 in the Grand Final at Dolphin Oval to claim their third premiership. Easts halfback Scott Thorburn was named the competition's Player of the Year, winning the Courier Mail Medal.

== Teams ==
The Queensland Cup returned to a 12-team format in 2002 with the inclusion of the North Queensland Young Guns, who served as the North Queensland Cowboys feeder club.

Along with the Cowboys using the Young Guns as their affiliate, the Brisbane Broncos and Melbourne Storm were again affiliated with the Toowoomba Clydesdales and Norths Devils, respectively.

Colours	Club	Home ground(s)
	Burleigh Bears	Pizzey Park
	Central Comets	Browne Park
	East Coast Tigers	Langlands Park
	Ipswich Jets	Bendigo Bank Oval
	Logan Scorpions	Meakin Park
	North Queensland Young Guns	Dairy Farmers Stadium
	Norths Devils	Bishop Park
	Redcliffe Dolphins	Dolphin Oval
	Souths Magpies	Davies Park, Brandon Park
	Toowoomba Clydesdales	Newtown Oval, ANZ Stadium
	Wests Panthers	Purtell Park
	Wynnum Seagulls	Kougari Oval

== Ladder ==
2002 Queensland Cup
Pos	Team	Pld	W	D	L	PF	PA	PD	Pts
1	Redcliffe Dolphins (P)	22	18	0	4	833	376	+457	36
2	East Coast Tigers	22	16	1	5	704	488	+216	33
3	Ipswich Jets	22	16	0	6	673	402	+271	32
4	Burleigh Bears	22	15	1	6	768	497	+271	31
5	Norths Devils	22	14	0	8	774	441	+363	28
6	North Queensland Young Guns	22	14	0	8	713	541	+172	28
7	Toowoomba Clydesdales	22	13	0	9	792	624	+168	26
8	Wynnum Seagulls	22	13	0	9	654	529	+125	26
9	Central Comets	22	4	1	17	434	814	-380	9
10	Wests Panthers	22	4	0	18	432	854	-422	8
11	Souths Magpies	22	3	1	18	488	840	-352	7
12	Logan Scorpions	22	0	0	22	303	1192	-889	0

== Finals series ==
Home	Score	Away	Match Information
Home	Score	Away	Date	Venue
Qualifying / Elimination Finals
Burleigh Bears	20 – 42	Norths Devils	31 August 2002	Pizzey Park
East Coast Tigers	22 – 28	Ipswich Jets	31 August 2002	Langlands Park
Semi-finals
Redcliffe Dolphins	17 – 16	Ipswich Jets	7 September 2002	Dolphin Oval
East Coast Tigers	16 – 18	Norths Devils	7 September 2002	Langlands Park
Preliminary Final
Ipswich Jets	29 – 26	Norths Devils	14 September 2002	Bendigo Bank Oval
Grand Final
Redcliffe Dolphins	34 – 10	Ipswich Jets	21 September 2002	Dolphin Oval

Qualifying / Elimination Finals
2	East Coast	22
3	Ipswich	28
4	Burleigh	20
5	Norths	42

Major / Minor Semi-finals
1	Redcliffe	17
Ipswich	16
East Coast	16
Norths	18

Preliminary Final
Ipswich	29
Norths	26

Grand Final
Redcliffe	34
Ipswich	10

== Grand Final ==
Saturday, 21 September

Redcliffe Dolphins	34 – 10	Ipswich Jets
Tries: Aaron Barba 2 Barry Berrigan 1 Trent Leis 1 Damien Richters 1 Paul Shilvock 1 Goals: Damien Richters 5	1st: 22 - 0; 2nd: 12 - 10	Tries: 1 Aaron Bulow; 1 Steven West; Goals: 1 Steven West

Dolphin Oval
Attendance: 9,000
Referee: Tony Maksoud
Player of the Match: Barry Berrigan (Redcliffe)

Redcliffe Dolphins	Position	Ipswich Jets
Trent Leis	FB	Marshall Chalk
Paul Shilvock	WG	Steven West
Damien Richters	CE	Aaron Bulow
Brian Jellick	CE	Richard Allwood
Aaron Barba	WG	Faron Anderson
Shane Perry	FE	Brendon Lindsay
Mick Roberts	HB	Ricky Bird
Troy Lindsay	PR	Jamie Mathiou
Barry Berrigan	HK	Matt Doeg
Adam Starr	PR	Danny McAllister
Luke Scott (c)	SR	Anthony Seibold
Danny Burke	SR	Andrew Hamilton
Grant Flugge	LK	Danny Coburn
Russell Lahiff	Bench	Kerry Theuerkauf
David Stagg	Bench	Reggie Cressbrook
Andrew Wynyard	Bench	Chris Anderson
Shane Tronc	Bench	Brian McCarthy
Neil Wharton	Coach	Gary Greinke

Redcliffe finished the regular season with the minor premiership, their third, and cruised through the finals. After earning a first round bye, they defeated Ipswich by a point in the major semi final, qualifying for their sixth overall and fourth consecutive Grand Final. Ipswich qualified for the finals for the first time after finishing third, and defeated the East Coast Tigers in the first week of the playoffs. The loss to Redcliffe saw them face Norths in the preliminary final, in which they won 29–26 to set up a rematch with the Dolphins in the Grand Final. In the regular season, Redcliffe defeated Ipswich on both occasions (20–18 in Round 2 and 24–12 in Round 12).

=== First half ===
It took just 10 seconds for tensions to flare in the decider after Jets' prop Danny McAllister was hit with a high tackle from the kick off by Dolphins' captain Luke Scott. An all-in brawl erupted, with both teams coming together in a melee. Moments after the referees had finally regained order, the fight erupted again between Scott and McAllister. Both players were subsequently sent to the sin bin. In the 12th minute, Redcliffe opened the scoring through winger Aaron Barba. It was a dominant first half for the Dolphins, who led 22–0 at half time after tries to Bara (his second), Damien Richters and Barry Berrigan added tries.

=== Second half ===
Three minutes into the second half, Redcliffe pushed their lead to 28 when winger Phil Shilvock scored, the try all but wrapping up the game. Ipswich finally got on the scoreboard in the 49th minute when winger Steven West latched onto a Ricky Bird grubber. Redcliffe scored again in the 61st minute, when a pinpoint Shane Perry chip kick found Trent Leis, who scored in his third Grand Final. Jets' centre Aaron Bulow scored seven minutes later but the game was well out of reach for Ipswich, as Redcliffe secured their third premiership. Dolphins' hooker Barry Berrigan was named man of the match.

The victorious Redcliffe side featured two players who would play in the Brisbane Broncos 2006 NRL Grand Final win over the Melbourne Storm, with Shane Perry starting at halfback and David Stagg starting at centre in the victory.

== Player statistics ==
=== Leading try scorers ===
Pos	Player	Team	Tries
1	Dan Kennedy	Burleigh Bears	34
2	Aaron Barba	Redcliffe Dolphins	28
3	Brian Jellick	Redcliffe Dolphins	21
3	Elia Tuqiri	Toowoomba Clydesdales	21
5	Nick Parfitt	Toowoomba Clydesdales	19

=== Leading point scorers ===
Pos	Player	Team	T	G	FG	Pts
1	Damien Richters	Redcliffe Dolphins	10	103	-	246
2	Greg Bourke	Burleigh Bears	17	77	-	222
3	Scott Thorburn	East Coast Tigers	10	81	1	203
4	Cameron Smith	Norths Devils	8	76	-	184
5	Justin McKay	North Queensland Young Guns	8	75	1	183

== End-of-season awards ==
- Courier Mail Medal: Scott Thorburn ( Easts Tigers)
- Rookie of the Year: David Stagg ( Redcliffe Dolphins)

== See also ==
- Queensland Cup
- Queensland Rugby League
