= 2004 Queensland Cup =

- Duration: March 13 – September 18, 2004
- Teams: 12
- Premiers: Burleigh Bears (2nd title)
- Minor premiers: Burleigh Bears (2nd title)
- Matches played: 138
- Points scored: 8,022
- Top points scorer: Damien Richters (246)
- Player of the year: Brent McConnell (Courier Mail Medal)
- Top try-scorer(s): Brent McConnell; Nick Parfitt (22)

The 2004 Queensland Cup season was the 9th season of Queensland's top-level statewide rugby league competition run by the Queensland Rugby League in Queensland, Australia. The competition featured 12 teams playing a 26-week long season (including finals) from March to September.

The Burleigh Bears defeated the Easts Tigers 22–18 in the Grand Final at Suncorp Stadium to claim their second premiership. Burleigh halfback Brent McConnell was named the competition's Player of the Year, winning the Courier Mail Medal.

== Teams ==
Wests Panthers, who participated in the Queensland Cup since the inaugural season in 1996, withdrew from the competition at the end of 2003. They were replaced by Brothers-Valleys, a club formed in 2002 by the merger of Past Brothers, who played in the Queensland Cup from 1996 to 1998, and the Fortitude Valley Diehards, who originally folded in 1995.

The Brisbane Broncos, Melbourne Storm and North Queensland Cowboys were again affiliated with the Toowoomba Clydesdales, Norths Devils and North Queensland Young Guns respectively.

| Colours | Club | Home ground(s) | Head coach (s) | Captain (s) | NRL Affiliate |
|---|---|---|---|---|---|
| | Brothers-Valleys | O'Callaghan Park | Gary O'Brien | Scott Maguire | None |
| | Burleigh Bears | Pizzey Park | Rick Stone | Ali Brown | None |
| | Central Comets | Browne Park | Neale Crow | Wade Rothery | None |
| | Easts Tigers | Langlands Park | Michael Booth | Darren Smith | None |
| | Ipswich Jets | Bendigo Bank Oval | Trevor Gillmeister | Danny Coburn | None |
| | North Queensland Young Guns | Dairy Farmers Stadium | Adrian Thomson | Daniel Strickland | North Queensland Cowboys |
| | Norths Devils | Bishop Park | Gary Greinke | Andrew Hamilton | Melbourne Storm |
| | Redcliffe Dolphins | Dolphin Oval | Neil Wharton | Troy Lindsay | None |
| | Souths Logan Magpies | Davies Park | Anthony Griffin → Mitch Brennan | Jace van Dijk | None |
| | Toowoomba Clydesdales | Clive Berghofer Stadium | John Dixon | Adrian Vowles | Brisbane Broncos |
| | Tweed Heads Seagulls | Piggabeen Sports Complex | Steve Murphy | Marty Stone | None |
| | Wynnum Seagulls | Kougari Oval | Kelly Egan | Damien Quinn | None |

== Ladder ==
2004 Queensland Cup
| Pos | Team | Pld | W | D | L | PF | PA | PD | Pts |
|---|---|---|---|---|---|---|---|---|---|
| 1 | Burleigh Bears (P) | 22 | 16 | 2 | 4 | 725 | 450 | +275 | 34 |
| 2 | Norths Devils | 22 | 15 | 1 | 6 | 789 | 503 | +286 | 31 |
| 3 | Easts Tigers | 22 | 15 | 1 | 6 | 791 | 540 | +251 | 31 |
| 4 | Toowoomba Clydesdales | 22 | 14 | 1 | 17 | 770 | 543 | +227 | 29 |
| 5 | Wynnum Seagulls | 22 | 14 | 1 | 7 | 634 | 583 | +51 | 29 |
| 6 | Redcliffe Dolphins | 22 | 13 | 0 | 9 | 774 | 538 | +236 | 26 |
| 7 | North Queensland Young Guns | 22 | 11 | 1 | 10 | 717 | 567 | +150 | 23 |
| 8 | Tweed Heads Seagulls | 22 | 9 | 1 | 12 | 512 | 657 | -145 | 19 |
| 9 | Central Comets | 22 | 8 | 0 | 14 | 566 | 705 | -139 | 16 |
| 10 | Ipswich Jets | 22 | 7 | 1 | 14 | 558 | 620 | -62 | 15 |
| 11 | Souths Logan Magpies | 22 | 5 | 0 | 17 | 538 | 922 | -384 | 10 |
| 12 | Brothers-Valleys | 22 | 0 | 1 | 21 | 314 | 1060 | -746 | 1 |

== Finals series ==
| Home | Score | Away | Match Information |
| Home | Score | Away | Date | Venue |
|---|---|---|---|---|
Qualifying / Elimination Finals
| Toowoomba Clydesdales | 38 – 42† | Wynnum Seagulls | 28 August 2004 | Clive Berghofer Stadium |
| Norths Devils | 18 – 35 | Easts Tigers | 29 August 2004 | Bishop Park |
Semi-finals
| Burleigh Bears | 17 – 16 | Easts Tigers | 4 September 2004 | Pizzey Park |
| Norths Devils | 18 – 36 | Wynnum Seagulls | 5 September 2004 | Bishop Park |
Preliminary Final
| Easts Tigers | 50 – 24 | Wynnum Seagulls | 11 September 2004 | Langlands Park |
Grand Final
| Burleigh Bears | 22 – 18† | Easts Tigers | 18 September 2004 | Suncorp Stadium |

† Match decided in extra time.

Qualifying / Elimination Finals
2 | Norths | 18
3 | Easts | 35
4 | Toowoomba | 38
5 | Wynnum | 42

Major / Minor Semi-finals
1 | Burleigh | 17
Easts | 16
Norths | 18
Wynnum | 36

Preliminary Final
Easts | 50
Wynnum | 24

Grand Final
Burleigh | 22
Easts | 18

== Grand Final ==
Saturday, 18 September

| Burleigh Bears | 22 – 18 After extra time | Easts Tigers |
|---|---|---|
| Tries: John Flint 1 Adam Hayden 1 Shane O'Flanagan 1 Nick Shaw 1 Goals: Reggie Cressbrook 3 | 1st: 16 - 6; 2nd: 2 - 12; ET: 4 - 0 Report | Tries: 1 Steve Beattie; 1 Steve Renouf; 1 Trent Young; Goals: 2 Michael Pearce; 1 Dane Campbell |

Suncorp Stadium
Attendance: 9,398
Referee: Tony Maksoud
Player of the Match: John Flint (Burleigh)

| Burleigh Bears | Position | Easts Tigers |
|---|---|---|
| Reggie Cressbrook | FB | Jason Barsley |
| Trent Purdon | WG | Steve Beattie |
| Jason Webber | CE | Steve Renouf |
| Nick Shaw | CE | Wade Liddell |
| Aseri Laing | WG | Michael Pearce |
| Adam Hayden | FE | Isaac Kaufmann |
| Brent McConnell | HB | Dane Campbell |
| Ali Brown (c) | PR | Charlie Tonga |
| Ryan Gundry | HK | Trent Young |
| Adam Watene | PR | Scott Alo |
| Martin Griese | SR | Darren Smith |
| John Flint | SR | Scott Sipple |
| Robert Apanui | LK | Dallas McIlwain |
| Shane O'Flanagan | Bench | Martin Allen |
| Tony Gray | Bench | Leigh Coghill |
| Kris Flint | Bench | Matt Lockyer |
| David Hicks | Bench | Paul Dezolt |
| Rick Stone | Coach | Michael Booth |

Burleigh, who finished as minor premiers for the second season in a row, defeated Easts by a point in their major semi final to earn a spot in the Grand Final, their third since 1997. Easts, who came 3rd in the regular season, defeated the 2nd placed Norths in the qualifying final to set up their match with Burleigh. The loss saw them then face Wynnum in the preliminary final, who they defeated 50–24 to set up a rematch with the Bears in the Grand Final. During the regular season, Burleigh defeated Easts in both of their encounters (46–20 in Round 5 and 36–34 in Round 15).

=== First half ===
Burleigh opened the first half strongly when five-eighth Adam Hayden stepped through Easts' defensive line to score in the 6th minute. Three minutes later, Hayden put centre Nick Shaw through a hole to score the Bears' second try. The Tigers got back into the contest in the 20th minute, when hooker Trent Young muscled his way over underneath posts. Burleigh regained their 10-point lead when second rower John Flint burst through to score in the 31st minute as the Bears took a 16–6 lead into the break.

=== Second half ===
Easts hit back 10 minutes into the second half when former Australian and Queensland representative Steve Renouf spun through a defender to score in the corner. Micheal Pearce converted the try from the sideline to cut the lead to four. A Reggie Cressbrook penalty goal pushed Burleigh's lead to six, setting up a tense final 20 minutes. With just over a minute to play, Burleigh's Kris Flint attempted a field goal that would've sealed the game for the Bears but missed to the right, giving Easts one last chance. With 30 seconds remaining, Tigers' halfback Dane Campbell put in a chip kick for winger Steve Beattie, who burst through two Burleigh defenders to score. Campbell then converted from out wide to send the game into extra time.

=== Extra time ===
Easts had the first opportunity to win the game in the third minute of extra time, when Campbell attempted a field goal then went wide right. Both teams missed multiple field goal attempts before Burleigh prop Shane O'Flanagan barged over to score the premiership-winning try in the 17th minute of extra time.

== Player statistics ==
=== Leading try scorers ===
| Pos | Player | Team | Tries |
|---|---|---|---|
| 1 | Brent McConnell | Burleigh Bears | 22 |
| 1 | Nick Parfitt | Toowoomba Clydesdales | 22 |
| 2 | Derek Fletcher | Norths Devils | 20 |
| 2 | Michael Gordon | Tweed Heads Seagulls | 20 |
| 2 | Brian Jellick | Redcliffe Dolphins | 20 |

=== Leading point scorers ===
| Pos | Player | Team | T | G | FG | Pts |
|---|---|---|---|---|---|---|
| 1 | Damien Richters | Redcliffe Dolphins | 10 | 103 | - | 246 |
| 2 | Reggie Cressbrook | Burleigh Bears | 13 | 82 | - | 216 |
| 3 | Nick Parfitt | Toowoomba Clydesdales | 22 | 56 | - | 200 |
| 4 | Dane Campbell | Easts Tigers | 12 | 64 | 1 | 177 |
| 5 | Brenton Bowen | North Queensland Young Guns | 15 | 47 | - | 154 |

== End-of-season awards ==
- Courier Mail Medal: Brent McConnell ( Burleigh Bears)
- Rookie of the Year: Luke Dalziel-Don ( Wynnum Seagulls)

== See also ==
- Queensland Cup
- Queensland Rugby League
