= 1999 Queensland Cup =

- Duration: March 13 – September 11, 1999
- Teams: 12
- Premiers: Burleigh Bears (1st title)
- Minor premiers: Redcliffe Dolphins (1st title)
- Matches played: 138
- Points scored: 6,677
- Top points scorer: John Wilshere (256)
- Player of the year: Mick Roberts
- Top try-scorer: Aaron Douglas (30)

The 1999 Queensland Cup season was the 4th season of Queensland's top-level statewide rugby league competition.

The competition was contested by fourteen teams over a 26-week long season (including finals), with the Burleigh defeating the Redcliffe Dolphins 12–10 in the grand final at Suncorp Stadium. Redcliffe halfback Mick Roberts was named the competition's Player of the Year.

== Teams ==
The number of teams in the competition was reduced from 16 to 12 for the 1999 season. Brisbane Brothers, Bundaberg Grizzlies, Gold Coast Vikings and Townsville Stingers were all withdrawn. Brothers and Bundaberg both competed in the inaugural season of the Queensland Cup, while Townsville and the Vikings both played just one season.

For the 1999 season, the Brisbane Broncos were affiliated with the Toowoomba Clydesdales, the Melbourne Storm with the Norths Devils and the North Queensland Cowboys with the Cairns Cyclones and Wests Panthers. The Auckland Warriors also used Souths Magpies and Wynnum Seagulls as feeder clubs, sending them up to four players each round.

Colours	Club	Home ground(s)
	Burleigh Bears	Pizzey Park
	Cairns Cyclones	Barlow Park, Dairy Farmers Stadium
	Central Capras	Browne Park
	Easts Tigers	Langlands Park
	Ipswich Jets	First Provincial Oval
	Logan Scorpions	Meakin Park
	Norths Devils	Bishop Park
	Redcliffe Dolphins	Dolphin Oval
	Souths Magpies	Davies Park
	Toowoomba Clydesdales	Athletic Oval, ANZ Stadium
	Wests Panthers	Purtell Park
	Wynnum Seagulls	Kougari Oval

== Ladder ==
1999 Queensland Cup
Pos	Team	Pld	W	D	L	PF	PA	PD	Pts
1	Redcliffe Dolphins	22	17	1	4	660	361	+299	35
2	Norths Devils	22	17	0	5	791	393	+398	34
3	Burleigh Bears (P)	22	16	0	6	685	396	+289	33
4	Toowoomba Clydesdales	22	14	0	8	602	530	+72	28
5	Easts Tigers	22	13	1	8	611	438	+173	27
6	Wests Panthers	22	13	1	8	551	431	+120	27
7	Logan Scorpions	22	10	0	12	478	561	-83	20
8	Cairns Cyclones	22	9	1	12	494	514	-20	19
9	Wynnum Seagulls	22	9	1	12	459	577	-118	19
10	Ipswich Jets	22	6	0	16	443	646	-203	12
11	Central Capras	22	4	0	18	440	626	-186	8
12	Souths Magpies	22	1	0	21	217	958	-741	2

== Finals series ==
Home	Score	Away	Match Information
Home	Score	Away	Date	Venue
Minor semi-finals
Norths Devils	30 – 34	Burleigh Bears	21 August 1999	Bishop Park
Toowoomba Clydesdales	22 – 6	Easts Tigers	22 August 1999	Athletic Oval
Major semi-finals
Redcliffe Dolphins	18 – 24	Burleigh Bears	28 August 1999	Dolphin Oval
Norths Devils	24 – 18	Toowoomba Clydesdales	29 August 1999	Bishop Park
Preliminary final
Redcliffe Dolphins	26 – 22	Norths Devils	4 September 1999	Dolphin Oval
Grand final
Burleigh Bears	12 – 10	Redcliffe Dolphins	11 September 1999	Suncorp Stadium

Qualifying / Elimination finals
2	Norths	30
3	Burleigh	34
4	Toowoomba	22
5	Easts	6

Major / Minor semi-finals
1	Redcliffe	18
Burleigh	24
Norths	24
Toowoomba	18

Preliminary final
Redcliffe	26
Norths	22

Grand final
Burleigh	12
Redcliffe	10

== Grand final ==
Saturday, 11 September

Burleigh Bears	12 – 10	Redcliffe Dolphins
Tries: Darren Anderson 1 Jamie Mahon 1 Goals: Ben Lythe 2	1st: 8 - 4; 2nd: 4 - 6 Report	Tries: 1 Rick Hewinson; 1 Trent Leis; Goals: 1 Trent Leis

Suncorp Stadium
Referee: Tony Maksoud

Burleigh Bears	Position	Redcliffe Dolphins
Jamie Mahon	FB	Adam Mogg
Aaron Douglas	WG	Ricky Hewinson
Darren Anderson	CE	Mixie Lui
Frank Napoli	CE	Ben Roedder
Faron Anderson	WG	Trent Leis
Craig Freer	FE	Sam Obst
Grant Adamson (c)	HB	Mick Roberts
Tony Priddle	PR	Ian Graham
Ben Lythe	HK	Craig O'Dwyer
Shane O'Flanagan	PR	Troy Lindsay
Bill Dunn	SR	Luke Scott
Hamish Smith	SR	James Hinchey
Dean Allen	LK	Tony Gould (c)
Brad Middlebosch	Bench	Michael Crocker
Ali Brown	Bench	Chris Essex
Justin Bryant	Bench	Shane Sanderson
Reggie Cressbrook	Bench	John Paul Cherry
Rick Stone	Coach	Alex Corvo

Burleigh qualified for their first grand final after a comeback win over Norths in the minor semi-finals and with a six-point win over Redcliffe a week later. Redcliffe, who finished as minor premiers for the first time and earned a first week bye, were forced into a preliminary final with Norths after losing to the Bears. The Dolphins held on for a four-point victory to book their third grand final appearance in five years.

=== First half ===
After Burleigh kicked a penalty goal inside the opening minute, it took 20 minutes for the first try of the game to be scored, with Bears' centre Darren Anderson crossing out wide. With six minutes to play in the first half, Dolphins' centre Mixie Lui put his winger Trent Leis into gap to score. Leis missed the ensuing conversion leaving his side trailing by four points at half time.

=== Second half ===
Redcliffe opened the second half with a penalty goal from right in front after Burleigh prop Tony Priddle was penalised. 10 minutes later, the Dolphins nabbed their second try when winger Ricky Hewinson scored in the corner, courtesy of a Tony Gould cutout pass. Leis failed to convert but Redcliffe had their first lead, 10–8, with 18 minutes remaining. Burleigh regained the lead shortly after when fullback Jamie Mahon scored what would be the game-winning try. A tense final 10 minutes followed but Burleigh hung on to claim their first premiership in their third season in the Queensland Cup.

Burleigh winger Aaron Douglas, who was stretchered off during the game, became the first player to win two Queensland Cup grand finals, winning his first with Redcliffe two years earlier.

== Player statistics ==
=== Leading try scorers ===
Pos	Player	Team	Tries
1	Aaron Douglas	Burleigh Bears	30
2	Matt Fisher	Wynnum Seagulls	26
3	Royce Simms	Logan Scorpions	17
4	Heath Egglestone	Central Capras	16
5	Steven Bell	Norths Devils	15
5	Trent Clayton	Redcliffe Dolphins	15
5	Craig Frawley	Toowoomba Clydesdales	15
5	Jabin Picker	Easts Tigers	15

=== Leading point scorers ===
Pos	Player	Team	T	G	FG	Pts
1	John Wilshere	Norths Devils	8	112	-	256
2	Ben Lythe	Burleigh Bears	4	104	1	225
3	Mick Roberts	Redcliffe Dolphins	9	86	-	208
4	Chris Lawler	Ipswich Jets	10	59	1	159
5	Scott Thorburn	Easts Tigers	6	49	-	122

== End-of-season awards ==
- Courier Mail Medal: Mick Roberts ( Redcliffe Dolphins)
- Rookie of the Year: David Seage ( Wynnum Seagulls)

== See also ==
- Queensland Cup
- Queensland Rugby League
