= 2023 Rugby League Pacific Championships squads =

This article lists the squads for the 2023 Rugby League Pacific Championships which were played from 14 October to 5 November 2023.

== Pacific Cup ==
=== Australia ===
The Australian squad was announced on 3 October 2023, with James Tedesco as captain.
Jersey numbers reflect the team selected for the Finals in week four.
Statistics in this table are compiled from the website, Rugby League Project.

#	Player	Age	Position	Games	Tries	Goals	Field goals	Points	Club
1	James Tedesco	30	Fullback	3	1	0	0	4	Sydney Roosters
2	Dylan Edwards	27	Wing, Fullback	3	1	0	0	4	Penrith Panthers
3	Hamiso Tabuai-Fidow	22	Centre, Fullback	3	2	0	0	8	Dolphins
4	Kotoni Staggs	25	Centre	3	1	5	0	14	Brisbane Broncos
5	Valentine Holmes	28	Wing	2	1	6	0	16	North Queensland Cowboys
6	Cameron Munster	29	Five-eighth	3	0	0	0	0	Melbourne Storm
7	Daly Cherry-Evans	34	Halfback	3	0	0	0	0	Manly Warringah Sea Eagles
8	Payne Haas	23	Prop	2	1	0	0	4	Brisbane Broncos
9	Ben Hunt	33	Hooker, Halfback	3	1	0	0	4	St. George Illawarra Dragons
10	Tino Fa'asuamaleaui	23	Prop	2	1	0	0	4	Gold Coast Titans
17	Reuben Cotter	24	Second-row, Prop	3	0	0	0	0	North Queensland Cowboys
12	Liam Martin	26	Second-row	2	0	0	0	0	Penrith Panthers
13	Isaah Yeo	28	Lock	3	0	0	0	0	Penrith Panthers
14	Harry Grant	25	Hooker	3	0	0	0	0	Melbourne Storm
15	Lindsay Collins	27	Prop	3	2	0	0	8	Sydney Roosters
16	Patrick Carrigan	25	Lock	3	0	0	0	0	Brisbane Broncos
18	Nicho Hynes	27	Halfback, Fullback	2	0	0	0	0	Cronulla-Sutherland Sharks
19	Thomas Flegler	24	Prop	1	0	0	0	0	Brisbane Broncos
11	Cameron Murray	25	Second-row, Lock	2	2	0	0	8	South Sydney Rabbitohs
20	Selwyn Cobbo	21	Wing	1	0	0	0	0	Brisbane Broncos
21	Jake Trbojevic	29	Prop, Lock	1	0	0	0	0	Manly Warringah Sea Eagles

Support Staff

- Head Coach: Mal Meninga

Notes

- Nicho Hynes replaced original selection Nathan Cleary, who withdrew due to injury, as announced by the NRL on 4 October 2023.
- Dylan Edwards replaced original selection Josh Addo-Carr, who was stood down by the NRL, as announced on 6 October 2023.

=== New Zealand ===
The New Zealand squad was announced on 4 October 2023.
Jersey numbers reflect the team selected for the Finals in week four.
Statistics in this table are compiled from the website, Rugby League Project.

#	Player	Age	Position	Games	Tries	Goals	Field goals	Points	Club
1	Charnze Nicoll-Klokstad	28	Fullback	3	0	0	0	0	New Zealand Warriors
2	Ronaldo Mulitalo	23	Wing	3	4	0	0	16	Cronulla-Sutherland Sharks
3	Matthew Timoko	23	Centre	3	1	0	0	4	Canberra Raiders
4	Joseph Manu	27	Centre, Fullback	3	0	0	0	0	Sydney Roosters
5	Jamayne Isaako	27	Wing	3	4	15	0	46	Dolphins
6	Dylan Brown	23	Five-eighth	3	0	0	0	0	Parramatta Eels
7	Jahrome Hughes	29	Halfback	3	1	0	0	4	Melbourne Storm
8	James Fisher-Harris	27	Prop	3	1	0	0	4	Penrith Panthers
9	Kieran Foran	33	Hooker	3	0	0	0	0	Gold Coast Titans
10	Moses Leota	28	Prop	3	0	0	0	0	Penrith Panthers
11	Isaiah Papali'i	25	Second-row	3	1	0	0	4	Wests Tigers
12	Briton Nikora	25	Second-row	3	2	0	0	8	Cronulla-Sutherland Sharks
13	Joseph Tapine	29	Prop	3	0	0	0	0	Canberra Raiders
14	Fa'amanu Brown	28	Hooker	3	1	0	0	4	Newcastle Knights
15	Nelson Asofa-Solomona	27	Prop, Second-row	3	1	0	0	4	Melbourne Storm
16	Griffin Neame	22	Prop, Second-row	3	1	0	0	4	North Queensland Cowboys
17	Leo Thompson	23	Prop	3	0	0	0	0	Newcastle Knights
18	Naufahu Whyte	21	Lock	0	0	0	0	0	Sydney Roosters
19	Danny Levi	27	Hooker	0	0	0	0	0	Canberra Raiders
20	Wiremu Greig	23	Prop	0	0	0	0	0	Parramatta Eels
21	Keano Kini	19	Wing	0	0	0	0	0	Gold Coast Titans

Support Staff

- Head Coach: Michael Maguire

=== Samoa ===
The Toa Samoa squad was announced on 3 October 2023, with Junior Paulo as captain.
Jersey numbers reflect the team selected for week two.
Statistics in this table are compiled from the website, Rugby League Project.

#	Player	Age	Position	Games	Tries	Goals	Field goals	Points	Club
1	Sualauvi Fa'alogo	20	Fullback	2	0	0	0	0	Melbourne Storm
2	Murray Taulagi	24	Wing	2	1	0	0	4	North Queensland Cowboys
21	Tommy Talau	23	Centre, Wing	1	0	0	0	0	Wests Tigers
4	Marion Seve	28	Centre	1	0	0	0	0	Melbourne Storm
20	Greg Marzhew	26	Wing	1	0	0	0	0	Newcastle Knights
6	Stephen Crichton	23	Five-eighth, Centre	2	0	2	0	4	Penrith Panthers
7	Daejarn Asi	23	Halfback	2	0	0	0	0	Parramatta Eels
8	Stefano Utoikamanu	23	Prop	2	0	0	0	0	Wests Tigers
9	Gordon Chan Kum Tong	—	Hooker	2	0	0	0	0	Manly Warringah Sea Eagles
10	Junior Paulo	29	Prop	2	0	0	0	0	Parramatta Eels
11	Luciano Leilua	27	Second-row	2	1	0	0	4	North Queensland Cowboys
16	Heilum Luki	22	Second-row	2	0	0	0	0	North Queensland Cowboys
14	Spencer Leniu	23	Lock, Prop	2	0	0	0	0	Penrith Panthers
13	Keenan Palasia	26	Lock, Prop	2	0	0	0	0	Brisbane Broncos
15	Terrell May	24	Prop	2	0	0	0	0	Sydney Roosters
18	Royce Hunt	28	Prop	1	0	0	0	0	Cronulla-Sutherland Sharks
19	Ronald Volkman	21	Five-eighth	1	0	0	0	0	New Zealand Warriors
17	Justin Matamua	20	Prop	1	0	0	0	0	Wests Tigers
12	Connelly Lemuelu	25	Second-row	1	0	0	0	0	Dolphins
3	Izack Tago	21	Centre	1	0	0	0	0	Penrith Panthers
5	Brian To'o	25	Wing	1	0	0	0	0	Penrith Panthers
–	Young Tonumaipea	31	Centre	1	0	0	0	0	Melbourne Storm

Support Staff

- Head Coach: Ben Gardiner
- Nigel Vagana
- Tony Puletua
- Willie Poching

Notes

- Ronald Volkman and Tommy Talau were added to the original selections.

== Pacific Bowl ==
This three team men's tournament is to be hosted by Papua New Guinea.

=== Cook Islands ===
The Cook Islands squad was announced on 10 October 2023.
Jersey numbers reflect the team selected for week two.

#	Player	Age	Position	Games	Tries	Goals	Field goals	Points	Club
1	Esom Ioka	—	Fullback, Centre	2	2	1	0	10	Western Clydesdales
2	Malachi Morgan	—	Wing	2	0	0	0	0	Tweed Heads Seagulls
3	Kayal Iro	21	Centre, Fullback	2	0	0	0	0	Newtown Jets
4	Alvin Maungatti	—	Centre	1	0	0	0	0	—
5	Steven Marsters	24	Wing	2	1	3	0	10	Thirroul Butchers
6	Brad Takairangi	34	Five-eighth	2	0	0	0	0	Dapto Canaries
7	Esan Marsters	27	Halfback, Centre	2	1	0	0	4	Huddersfield Giants
8	Davvy Moale	20	Prop	2	0	0	0	0	South Sydney Rabbitohs
9	Ruatapu Ngatikaura	23	Hooker	2	0	0	0	0	Western Suburbs Magpies
17	Takai Mokohar	25	Second-row	2	0	0	0	0	Western Clydesdales
11	Zane Tetevano	32	Second-row	2	0	0	0	0	Leeds Rhinos
12	Reuben Porter	26	Second-row	2	0	0	0	0	North Sydney Bears
13	Pride Petterson-Robati	28	Lock	2	0	0	0	0	Burleigh Bears
14	Kadiyae Ioka	—	Five-eighth	2	0	0	0	0	Glenora Bears
15	Rhys Dakin	—	Prop	2	0	0	0	0	Newtown Jets
16	Justin Makirere	—	Prop	2	0	0	0	0	Norths Devils
10	William Samuel	26	Prop	1	0	0	0	0	Wynnum Manly Seagulls
18	Isaiah Cooper-Tetevano	28	Second-row	1	1	0	0	4	Mackay Cutters
19	Lucky Pokipoki	—	Prop	0	0	0	0	0	Ipswich Jets
–	Tevin Arona	28	Halfback	1	0	0	0	0	Hornby Panthers
–	Makahesi Makatoa	30	Prop	1	0	0	0	0	Parramatta Eels

Support Staff

- Head coach: Karmichael Hunt

=== Fiji ===
The Fiji Bati squad was announced on 6 October 2023, with Tui Kamikamica as captain.
Jersey numbers reflect the team selected for the Finals in week four.
Statistics in the table are drawn from the website, Rugby League Project, and include the Bowl Final on 5 November 2023.

#	Player	Age	Position	Games	Tries	Goals	Field goals	Points	Club
1	Jahream Bula	21	Fullback	3	1	0	0	4	Wests Tigers
2	Maika Sivo	30	Wing	3	3	0	0	12	Parramatta Eels
5	Mikaele Ravalawa	25	Centre, Wing	3	0	0	0	0	St. George Illawarra Dragons
4	Waqa Blake	29	Centre, Wing	3	3	0	0	12	Parramatta Eels
18	Jason Qareqare	19	Wing	2	1	0	0	4	Castleford Tigers
6	Kurt Donoghoe	21	Five-eighth, Lock	3	2	0	0	8	Dolphins
7	Brandon Wakeham	24	Halfback, Five-eighth	3	0	12	1	25	Wests Tigers
8	Tui Kamikamica	29	Prop	3	1	0	0	4	Melbourne Storm
9	Penioni Tagituimua	24	Hooker	3	0	0	0	0	Canterbury-Bankstown Bulldogs
10	King Vuniyayawa	28	Prop	2	0	0	0	0	Salford Red Devils
13	Taane Milne	28	Second-row, Wing	3	0	0	0	0	South Sydney Rabbitohs
12	Apisalome Saukuru	21	Second-row, Lock	3	0	0	0	0	Wests Tigers
15	Caleb Navale	—	Lock	3	1	0	0	4	Manly Warringah Sea Eagles
11	Kitione Kautoga	21	Second-row	2	0	0	0	0	Canterbury-Bankstown Bulldogs
16	Gordon Whippy	—	Prop	3	0	0	0	0	Ipswich Jets
17	Watisoni Waqanisaravi	—	Prop	2	0	0	0	0	Kaiviti Silktails
21	Pio Seci	30	Second-row	1	0	0	0	0	Forbes Magpies
20	Sirilo Lovokuro	—	Lock	2	0	0	0	0	Kaiviti Silktails
14	Noah Nailagoliva	—	Hooker	2	0	0	0	0	Newcastle Knights
3	Sunia Turuva	21	Centre, Wing	1	1	0	0	4	Penrith Panthers
–	Mesake Ravonu	—	Prop	1	0	0	0	0	Canterbury-Bankstown Bulldogs

Support Staff

- Head coach: Wise Kativerata

=== Papua New Guinea ===
The Papua New Guinea Kumuls squad was announced on 5 October 2023.
Jersey numbers reflect the team selected for the Finals in week four.
Statistics in this table are compiled from the website, Rugby League Project, and include the Bowl Final on 5 November 2023.

#	Player	Age	Position	Games	Tries	Goals	Field goals	Points	Club
1	Alex Johnston	28	Fullback, Wing	3	2	0	0	8	South Sydney Rabbitohs
2	Robert Derby	21	Wing	3	3	0	0	12	North Queensland Cowboys
3	Zac Laybutt	21	Centre	3	2	5	0	18	North Queensland Cowboys
4	Rodrick Tai	24	Centre	2	0	0	0	0	Papua New Guinea Hunters
5	Nene Macdonald	29	Wing, Centre	3	4	0	0	16	Leeds Rhinos
6	Kyle Laybutt	28	Five-eighth	3	0	0	0	0	Sunshine Coast Falcons
7	Lachlan Lam	25	Halfback, Five-eighth	3	0	0	0	0	Leigh Leopards
8	Epel Kapinias	25	Prop, Second-row	3	3	0	0	12	Papua New Guinea Hunters
9	Edwin Ipape	24	Hooker	2	1	0	0	4	Leigh Leopards
10	Valentine Richard	—	Prop	3	1	0	0	4	Papua New Guinea Hunters
11	Rhyse Martin	30	Second-row	2	0	8	0	16	Leeds Rhinos
12	Daniel Russell	27	Second-row	3	0	0	0	0	St. George Illawarra Dragons
13	Jack de Belin	32	Lock, Prop	3	0	0	0	0	St. George Illawarra Dragons
14	Judah Rimbu	22	Hooker, Halfback	3	0	0	0	0	Papua New Guinea Hunters
15	Liam Horne	26	Hooker	2	0	0	0	0	Castleford Tigers
16	Junior Rop	29	Lock, Prop	2	0	0	0	0	Papua New Guinea Hunters
17	Nixon Putt	28	Second-row	2	0	0	0	0	Central Queensland Capras
18	Jacob Alick	24	Second-row, Lock	2	0	0	0	0	Gold Coast Titans
19	Wellington Albert	29	Prop	1	0	0	0	0	London Broncos
20	Keven Appo	24	Second-row	1	0	0	0	0	Bradford Bulls
21	Benji Kot	26	Second-row, Centre	2	1	0	0	4	Papua New Guinea Hunters
–	Justin Olam	29	Centre	0	0	0	0	0	Melbourne Storm
–	Cruise Ten	22	Lock	0	0	0	0	0	Souths Logan Magpies
–	McKenzie Yei	26	Second-row, Prop	0	0	0	0	0	Featherstone Rovers

Support Staff

- Head coach: Justin Holbrook

Notes

- Cruise Ten was added to the original selections.

== Women ==
=== Australia ===
The Australian Jillaroos squad was announced on 3 October 2023, with Kezie Apps and Ali Brigginshaw as co-captains.
Jersey numbers reflect the team selected for week three.

#	Player	Age	Position	Games	Tries	Goals	Field goals	Points	Club
1	Tamika Upton	26	Fullback	2	2	0	0	8	Newcastle Knights
2	Jaime Chapman	21	Wing, Centre	2	1	0	0	4	Gold Coast Titans
3	Jessica Sergis	26	Centre	2	0	0	0	0	Sydney Roosters
4	Isabelle Kelly	27	Centre	2	0	0	0	0	Sydney Roosters
5	Jakiya Whitfeld	22	Wing	1	0	0	0	0	Wests Tigers
6	Tarryn Aiken	24	Five-eighth, Halfback	2	0	0	0	0	Sydney Roosters
7	Ali Brigginshaw	33	Halfback, Lock	2	0	2	0	4	Brisbane Broncos
8	Shannon Mato	25	Prop	2	0	0	0	0	Gold Coast Titans
9	Lauren Brown	28	Hooker, Halfback	2	0	1	0	2	Gold Coast Titans
11	Kezie Apps	32	Prop, Second-row	2	0	0	0	0	Wests Tigers
15	Yasmin Clydsdale	29	Second-row, Centre	1	0	0	0	0	Newcastle Knights
12	Olivia Kernick	22	Second-row	2	0	0	0	0	Sydney Roosters
13	Simaima Taufa	29	Lock	2	0	0	0	0	Canberra Raiders
14	Emma Tonegato	28	Fullback, Five-eighth	2	0	0	0	0	Cronulla-Sutherland Sharks
10	Jessika Elliston	26	Prop, Second-row	2	0	0	0	0	Gold Coast Titans
16	Kennedy Cherrington	24	Lock	2	0	0	0	0	Parramatta Eels
17	Emma Manzelmann	21	Hooker	1	0	0	0	0	North Queensland Cowboys
18	Shaylee Bent	23	Second-row, Centre	0	0	0	0	0	Gold Coast Titans
19	Shenae Ciesiolka	26	Centre, Fullback	0	0	0	0	0	Brisbane Broncos
20	Teagan Berry	21	Fullback	0	0	0	0	0	St. George Illawarra Dragons
21	Keeley Davis	23	Hooker	1	0	0	0	0	Sydney Roosters
–	Caitlan Johnston	22	Second-row, Prop	1	1	0	0	4	Newcastle Knights
–	Keilee Joseph	21	Lock, Second-row	0	0	0	0	0	Sydney Roosters
–	Julia Robinson	25	Wing, Fullback	1	0	0	0	0	Brisbane Broncos

Support Staff

- Head coach: Brad Donald

Notes

- Keilee Joseph replaced original selection Evania Pelite, who withdrew due to injury, as announced by the NRL on 6 October 2023.
- Jakiya Whitfeld, Shenae Ciesiolka, and Teagan Berry joined the squad ahead of the 28 October 2023 match, replacing Julia Robinson (personal reasons), Keilee Joseph (personal reasons), and Caitlan Johnston (injury).

=== Cook Islands ===
The Cook Islands Moana squad was announced on 4 October 2023.
Jersey numbers reflect the team selected for week two.

#	Player	Age	Position	Games	Tries	Goals	Field goals	Points	Club
1	Kiana Takairangi	31	Fullback, Centre	1	1	0	0	4	Cronulla-Sutherland Sharks
2	Alesha Willcox	—	Wing	1	0	0	0	0	Truganina Rabbitohs
3	Kaiyah Atai	—	Centre, Second-row	1	0	0	0	0	Glenmore Park Brumbies
4	Chantelle Holloway-Samuels	24	Centre	1	1	0	0	4	Tweed Heads Seagulls
5	Mahinaarangi Rewi	—	Wing	1	1	0	0	4	Minto Cobras
6	Chantay Kiria-Ratu	19	Five-eighth	1	0	2	0	4	Gold CoastTitans
7	Lydia Turua-Quedley	24	Halfback	1	0	0	0	0	Mt Albert Lions
8	Ngatokotoru Arakua	26	Prop	1	0	0	0	0	Manurewa Marlins
9	Chelsea Makira	19	Hooker	1	1	0	0	4	Canterbury-Bankstown Bulldogs
10	Crystal Tamarua	28	Prop, Second-row	1	0	0	0	0	—
11	Jazmon Tupou-Witchman	19	Second-row, Prop	1	0	0	0	0	Cronulla-Sutherland Sharks
14	Kerehitina Matua	24	Second-row	1	0	0	0	0	Canberra Raiders
13	Anneka Stephens	34	Lock	1	0	0	0	0	Joondalup Giants
12	Ariel Ngatokorua	—	Hooker	1	0	0	0	0	Mascot Juniors
15	Paulina Morris-Ponga	—	Centre	1	0	0	0	0	Auckland City
16	Lavinia Kitai	—	Prop	1	0	0	0	0	Souths Logan Magpies
17	Jodeci Joseph	—	Centre	1	0	0	0	0	Manurewa Marlins
18	Kiana Sword-Tua	—	Second-row, Lock	0	0	0	0	0	Panthers
–	Rangi Aukino	—	Centre	0	0	0	0	0	Werribee Bears
–	Annemarie Kiria-Ratu	18	Fullback	0	0	0	0	0	—
–	Tiana Kore	20	Prop, Lock	0	0	0	0	0	Illawarra Steelers

Support Staff

- Head Coach:

=== Fiji ===
The Fiji Bulikula squad was announced on 6 October 2023. Josephine Maejiirs was previously named as captain.
Jersey numbers reflect the team selected for week one.

#	Player	Age	Position	Games	Tries	Goals	Field goals	Points	Club
1	Cassie Staples	30	Fullback, Wing	1	0	0	0	0	Cronulla-Sutherland Sharks
2	Vitalina Naikore	23	Centre, Wing	1	2	0	0	8	North Queensland Cowboys
3	Merewalesi Rokouono	29	Halfback, Centre	1	0	0	0	0	North Queensland Cowboys
4	Patricia Raikadroka	30	Centre	1	0	0	0	0	South Sydney Rabbitohs
5	Asena Rokomarama	27	Wing, Hooker	1	0	0	0	0	—
6	Sienna Laing	19	Five-eighth, Wing	1	0	0	0	0	Gold Coast Titans
7	Sereana Naitokatoka	—	Halfback, Hooker	1	0	0	0	0	Cronulla-Sutherland Sharks
8	Aliti Namoce Sagano	25	Prop, Lock	1	1	0	0	4	North Sydney Bears
9	Teaghan Laing	27	Hooker	1	0	0	0	0	Currumbin Eagles
10	Anastasia Shum	22	Prop, Second-row	1	0	0	0	0	Illawarra Steelers
11	Talei Holmes	23	Second-row	1	0	0	0	0	Cronulla-Sutherland Sharks
12	Ema Rainima	—	Second-row	1	0	0	0	0	South Sydney Rabbitohs
13	Josephine Maejiirs	—	Lock, Prop	1	0	0	0	0	South Sydney Rabbitohs
14	Siniva SaAnga	19	Halfback	1	0	0	0	0	South Sydney Rabbitohs
15	Grace Waqa	—	—	1	0	0	0	0	USP Raiders
16	Mere Kilawekana	—	—	1	0	0	0	0	—
17	Adi Sokula Waqa	—	—	1	0	0	0	0	USP Raiders
18	Alesi Kilawekana	—	—	0	0	0	0	0	USP Raiders
–	Asenaca Diranuve	23	—	0	0	0	0	0	Police Sharks
–	Ana Raduva	26	Wing, Fullback	0	0	0	0	0	Illawarra Steelers
–	Salote Sukakinamena	25	—	0	0	0	0	0	USP Raiders

Support Staff

- Head coach: Josaia Dakuitoga

=== New Zealand ===
The New Zealand Kiwi Ferns squad was announced on 4 October 2023. Georgia Hale and Raecene McGregor were named as co-captains on 10 October 2023.
Jersey numbers reflect the team selected for week three.

#	Player	Age	Position	Games	Tries	Goals	Field goals	Points	Club
1	Apii Nicholls	30	Fullback	2	0	0	0	0	Canberra Raiders
2	Leianne Tufuga	21	Wing, Centre	3	1	0	0	4	Wests Tigers
3	Mele Hufanga	29	Centre	3	3	0	0	12	Brisbane Broncos
4	Abigail Roache	27	Centre, Wing	2	3	0	0	12	Newcastle Knights
5	Shanice Parker	25	Wing, Fullback	3	0	0	0	0	Newcastle Knights
6	Tyla Nathan-Wong	29	Five-eighth, Halfback	3	0	0	0	0	St. Geore Illawarra Dragons
7	Raecene McGregor	26	Halfback, Five-eighth	3	0	5	0	10	St. George Illawarra Dragons
15	Najvada George	24	Prop, Lock	3	0	0	0	0	Wests Tigers
9	Brooke Anderson	27	Hooker, Lock	3	0	0	0	0	Cronulla-Sutherland Sharks
10	Angelina Teakaraanga-Katoa	21	Prop	3	0	0	0	0	St. George Illawarra Dragons
11	Annessa Biddle	21	Second-row, Wing	3	2	0	0	8	Cronulla-Sutherland Sharks
12	Otesa Pule	20	Second-row, Centre	3	0	0	0	0	Sydney Roosters
13	Georgia Hale	28	Lock	3	0	0	0	0	Gold Coast Titans
14	Ashleigh Quinlan	28	Five-eighth, Halfback	2	0	0	0	0	Canberra Raiders
8	Mya Hill-Moana	21	Prop	3	0	0	0	0	Sydney Roosters
16	Jasmine Fogavini	26	Wing, Centre	3	0	0	0	0	Brisbane Broncos
17	Tiana Davison	23	Second-row	2	0	0	0	0	Newcastle Knights
18	Laishon Albert-Jones	26	Second-row, Lock	1	0	0	0	0	Newcastle Knights
19	Cheyelle Robins-Reti	26	Wing, Centre	1	0	0	0	0	Canberra Raiders
20	Capri Paekau	—	Hooker	1	0	0	0	0	Parramatta Eels
–	Amelia Pasikala	19	Prop	2	1	0	0	4	Sydney Roosters

Support Staff

- Head coach: Ricky Henry

=== Papua New Guinea ===
The Papua New Guinea Orchids squad was announced on 5 October 2023, with Elsie Albert as captain.
Jersey numbers reflect the team selected for week two.

#	Player	Age	Position	Games	Tries	Goals	Field goals	Points	Club
1	Latoniya Norris	22	Fullback	1	1	0	0	4	—
2	Lyiannah Allen	—	Wing	1	2	0	0	8	—
3	Belinda Gwasamun	28	Centre	1	0	0	0	0	Norths Devils
4	Shellie Long	23	Centre, Second-row	1	0	0	0	0	North Queensland Cowboys
5	Freda Waula	28	Wing, Fullback	1	0	0	0	0	—
6	Sera Koroi	21	Five-eighth	1	0	0	0	0	North Queensland Cowboys
7	Ua Ravu	26	Halfback	1	0	0	0	0	Canberra Raiders
13	Jessikah Reeves	22	Lock, Prop	1	0	0	0	0	North Queensland Cowboys
9	Roswita Kapo	23	Hooker	1	1	0	0	4	Wentworthville Magpies
10	Gloria Kaupa	25	Prop	1	0	0	0	0	—
11	Emily Veivers	22	Second-row, Centre	1	0	2	0	4	Brisbane Tigers
12	Essay Banu	21	Second-row	1	1	0	0	4	North Queensland Cowboys
16	Berthshiba Awoi	—	Second-row	1	0	0	0	0	Norths Devils
14	Meli Joe	—	interchange	1	0	0	0	0	—
15	Sareka Mooka	23	Centre	1	0	0	0	0	North Queensland Cowboys
17	Yolanda Taute	—	interchange	1	0	0	0	0	—
19	Leila Kerowa	—	Prop	1	1	0	0	4	—
18	Lancy Ulkambane	—	—	0	0	0	0	0	—
8	Elsie Albert	27	Prop	0	0	0	0	0	Parramatta Eels
20	Almah Johnson	—	Fullback	0	0	0	0	0	—
21	Delailah Ahose	—	Hooker	0	0	0	0	0	—
–	Sillah Rumints	—	—	0	0	0	0	0	—

Support Staff

- Head coach: Ben Jeffries

=== Samoa ===
The Fetu Samoa squad was announced on 3 October 2023, with Niall Williams Guthrie as captain.
Jersey numbers reflect the team selected for week one.

#	Player	Age	Position	Games	Tries	Goals	Field goals	Points	Club
1	Destiny Mino-Sinapati	—	Fullback, Centre	1	0	0	0	0	Gold Coast Titans
2	Taylor-Adeline Mapusua	25	Wing, Centre	1	2	0	0	8	St. George Illawarra Dragons
3	Petesa Lio	20	Centre, Wing	1	0	0	0	0	Canberra Raiders
4	Niall Williams-Guthrie	35	Centre	1	0	0	0	0	Gold Coast Titans
5	Lindsay Tui	18	Wing, Centre	1	2	0	0	8	Parramatta Eels
6	Pauline Piliae-Rasabale	31	Five-eighth, Fullback	1	0	3	0	6	Wests Tigers
7	Sienna Lofipo	19	Halfback	1	0	0	0	0	Gold Coast Titans
8	Fiona Jahnke	20	Prop, Lock	1	0	0	0	0	Cronulla-Sutherland Sharks
9	Destiny Brill	20	Hooker	1	0	0	0	0	Brisbane Broncos
10	Janelle Williams	33	Prop	1	0	0	0	0	Canberra Raiders
15	Onjeurlina Hunt	27	Second-row	1	0	0	0	0	Otahuhu Leopards
12	Malaela Sua	—	Second-row, Prop	1	0	0	0	0	Gold Coast Titans
13	Annetta Nu'uausala	28	Lock, Prop	1	1	0	0	4	Brisbane Broncos
16	Pihuka Berryman-Duff	—	Five-eighth	1	0	0	0	0	Parramatta Eels
17	Tafao Asaua	19	Prop	1	0	0	0	0	Manly Warringah Sea Eagles
19	Tamerah Leati	19	Centre	1	0	0	0	0	Newcastle Knights
21	Makayla Eli	—	Centre, Halfback	1	0	0	0	0	Manurewa Marlins
–	Avery-Rose Carmont	—	Hooker	0	0	0	0	0	Otahuhu Leopards
–	Christian Pio	23	Prop, Second-row	0	0	0	0	0	Wests Tigers
–	Jetaya Faifua	20	Prop	0	0	0	0	0	North Queensland Cowboys
–	Anasis Afia	—	interchange	0	0	0	0	0	—

Support Staff

- Head coach: Jamie Soward

=== Tonga ===
The Mate Ma'a Tonga squad was announced on 3 October 2023.
Jersey numbers reflect the team selected for week two.

#	Player	Age	Position	Games	Tries	Goals	Field goals	Points	Club
1	Lanulangi Veainu	29	Fullback	1	0	0	0	0	—
2	Lavinia Tauhalaliku	—	Wing	1	0	0	0	0	Auckland City
3	China Polata	21	Centre	1	0	0	0	0	North Queensland Cowboys
4	Litia Fusi	18	Centre	1	0	0	0	0	Canterbury-Bankstown Bulldogs
5	Haylee Hifo	—	Wing	1	0	0	0	0	Joondalup Giants
6	Cassey Tohi-Hiku	19	Five-eighth	1	0	1	0	2	Parramatta Eels
7	Tiana Penitani	27	Halfback	1	2	0	0	8	Cronulla-Sutherland Sharks
8	Folau Vaki	20	Prop	1	0	0	0	0	Wests Tigers
14	Jade Fonua	—	Lock	1	0	0	0	0	Parramatta Eels
10	Tegan Dymock	21	Prop	1	0	0	0	0	Cronulla-Sutherland Sharks
11	Amelia Mafi	28	Second-row	1	0	0	0	0	Parramatta Eels
12	Vanessa Foliaki	30	Second-row	1	0	0	0	0	Cronulla-Sutherland Sharks
13	Dannii Perese	—	Lock	1	0	0	0	0	Gold Coast Titans
9	Seli Mailangi	26	Hooker	1	0	0	0	0	North Sydney Bears
15	Natasha Penitani	—	Prop	1	0	0	0	0	Cronulla-Sutherland Sharks
16	Ilaisaane Taufa	—	Prop	1	0	0	0	0	Mt Albert Lions
17	Shannon Muru	—	Second-row	1	0	0	0	0	Parramatta Eels
18	Fatafehi Hanisi	20	Prop	0	0	0	0	0	Cronulla-Sutherland Sharks
19	Monica Samita	—	Hooker	0	0	0	0	0	—
20	Sarah Filimoeatu	—	Wing	0	0	0	0	0	Auckland City
–	Kalosipani Hopoate	19	Prop	0	0	0	0	0	Sydney Roosters

Support Staff

- Head coach: Kelvin Wright

== A Teams Match ==
=== New Zealand A ===
The New Zealand A squad was announced on 9 October 2023.
Kalani Going was named captain when the team line-up was announced on 19 October 2023.
Statistics in this table are compiled from the website, Rugby League Project.

#	Player	Age	Position	Games	Tries	Goals	Field goals	Points	Club
1	Keano Kini	19	Wing	0	0	0	0	0	Gold Coast Titans
2	Will Warbrick	25	Wing	0	0	0	0	0	Melbourne Storm
3	Rocco Berry	22	Centre	0	0	0	0	0	New Zealand Warriors
4	Bailey Simonsson	25	Wing, Centre	0	0	0	0	0	Parramatta Eels
5	Ali Leiataua	20	Centre	0	0	0	0	0	New Zealand Warriors
6	Taine Tuaupiki	24	Fullback	0	0	0	0	0	New Zealand Warriors
7	Zach Dockar-Clay	28	Lock	0	0	0	0	0	Sydney Roosters
8	Pasami Saulo	25	Prop	0	0	0	0	0	Canberra Raiders
9	Danny Levi	27	Hooker	0	0	0	0	0	Canberra Raiders
10	Wiremu Greig	23	Prop	0	0	0	0	0	Parramatta Eels
11	Jack Howarth	20	Second-row, Centre	0	0	0	0	0	Melbourne Storm
12	Jacob Laban	—	Second-row	0	0	0	0	0	New Zealand Warriors
13	Kalani Going	26	Second-row	0	0	0	0	0	New Zealand Warriors
14	Paul Roache	24	Hooker	0	0	0	0	0	New Zealand Warriors
15	Joe Chan	21	Second-row	0	0	0	0	0	Melbourne Storm
16	Benjamin Te Kura	—	Prop	0	0	0	0	0	Brisbane Broncos
17	Asu Kepaoa	23	Centre, Wing	0	0	0	0	0	Wests Tigers
18	Trey Mooney	21	Prop, Second-row	0	0	0	0	0	Canberra Raiders
19	Tanner Stowers-Smith	—	Prop	0	0	0	0	0	New Zealand Warriors
