= Berrigan =

Berrigan may refer to:

== People with the surname ==
- Australian (sibling) rugby players:
  - Barry Berrigan (born 1975)
  - Shaun Berrigan (born 1978)
- Ted Berrigan (1934–1983), American poet
- American (sibling) activist priests:
  - Philip Berrigan (1923–2002)
  - Daniel Berrigan (1921–2016)

== Plants ==
- Eremophila longifolia
- Pittosporum angustifolium

== Places in New South Wales, Australia ==
- Berrigan Shire, local government area
  - Berrigan, New South Wales, a town in the local government area
