= Timaima Ravisa =

Fiji international rugby league player

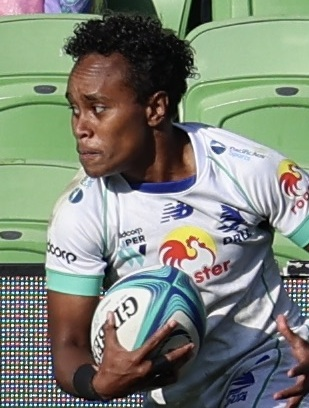
- Ravisa playing for Fijiana Drua in 2022 Super W Grand Final

Personal information
- Born: 1 May 1988 (age 36); Labasa, Macuata Province, Fiji
- Height: 160 cm (5 ft 3 in)
- Weight: 55 kg (8 st 9 lb)

Playing information

Rugby league
- Position: Five-eighth, Fullback
Club
Years	Team	Pld	T	G	FG	P
2019	New Zealand Warriors	2	0	0	0	0
Representative
Years	Team	Pld	T	G	FG	P
2019	Fiji	1	0	0	0	0

Rugby union
Representative
Years	Team	Pld	T	G	FG	P
	Fiji sevens
- Source: RLP As of 14 November 2020

Timaima Rosi Lulutai Ravisa (born 1 May 1988) is a Fijian rugby sevens and rugby league player who played for the New Zealand Warriors in the NRL Women's Premiership.

== Playing career ==
=== Rugby sevens ===
Ravisa was selected as a member of the Fijiana sevens team for the 2016 Summer Olympics in Brazil.

=== Rugby league ===
In 2019, Ravisa and her Fiji sevens teammate Roela Radiniyavuni relocated to Auckland to play rugby league for the Richmond Rovers. On 22 June 2019, she started at fullback for Fiji in their 28–0 win over Papua New Guinea.

On 10 July 2019, she joined the New Zealand Warriors NRL Women's Premiership. On 14 September 2019, she made her debut for the Warriors, starting at five-eighth in a 16–12 win over the Sydney Roosters.

=== Rugby union ===
Ravisa was named in the Fijiana Drua squad for the 2022 Super W season. She was selected for the Fijiana squad to the 2021 Rugby World Cup in New Zealand.
