= Boycie Nelson =

NZ rugby league footballer & coach

Personal information
- Born: 24 December 1974 (age 51)

Playing information
- Height: 186 cm (6 ft 1 in)
- Weight: 89 kg (14 st 0 lb)
- Position: Centre
Club
Years	Team	Pld	T	G	FG	P
1996	Waitakere City	22	19	0	1	76
1997–98	Widnes Vikings	9	2	0	0	8
1999	Auckland Warriors	5	1	0	0	4
2004	Limoux Grizzlies	14	6	13	0	48
	Total	50	28	13	1	136
Representative
Years	Team	Pld	T	G	FG	P
1998–00	New Zealand Māori	2	2	0	0	8

Boycie Nelson is a New Zealand coach who is the assistant coach of the New Zealand Warriors Holden Cup team and former rugby league former footballer who played as a goal-kicking centre.

== Playing career ==
=== New Zealand ===
Nelson grew up playing rugby league, playing for the Glenora Bears in the Auckland Rugby League competition.

Nelson was signed by the Auckland Warriors and played for their Colts side in the 1995 Lion Red Cup.

In 1996, he was involved in the Waitakere City Raiders side that lost the Lion Red Cup grand final, despite Boycie scoring three tries. He was then selected in the Lion Red Cup XIII that played against the touring Papua New Guinea team.

=== England ===
In 1997, Nelson travelled to England and joined the Widnes Vikings. Here he played alongside fellow Glenora players Ben Lythe, who would also later join the Warriors, and Brian Jellick who later became a Kiwi and played for the North Queensland Cowboys.

In 1998, Nelson returned to the Glenora Bears. He represented Auckland in the 1998 domestic season and toured Papua New Guinea with the New Zealand Māori.

=== Warriors ===
In 1999 he was signed by the Auckland Warriors and played five games in the National Rugby League. During 1999 Nelson also played for the Glenora Bears in the Auckland Rugby League competition and represented Auckland North in the National Provincial competition.

=== World Cup ===
Nelson was selected in the Aotearoa Māori squad at the 2000 Rugby League World Cup. He played two games for the Māori at the tournament and scored two tries. He also toured Australia with the New Zealand Residents in 2000.

=== Bartercard Cup ===
After ending his connections with the Warriors, Nelson returned to New Zealand Domestic competition and played for the Otahuhu Leopards in the new Bartercard Cup competition. He remained with the side until the end of the 2003 season.

=== France ===
In 2004 he played for Limoux Grizzlies in their successful Challenge Cup run, which was ended by an 80–20 loss to Wigan in round five. He scored the first and the third try for Limoux, David Cenet scored the other one. He also played the final of the French cup in 2005 with Limoux.

=== Back in New Zealand ===
Nelson later played for the Waitakere Rangers in the Bartercard Cup, and again represented the New Zealand Māori in 2006, playing in the Pacific Cup.

He later joined the police and in 2008 represented the New Zealand Police at the inaugural Police World Cup. He played for the Glenora Bears in the 2010 Fox Memorial and in 2012 was a co-coach at the club.

== Coaching career ==
Nelson was named the assistant coach of the New Zealand Warriors Holden Cup team for the 2017 season.
