= Dane Campbell =

Australian RL coach & former professional rugby league footballer

Personal information
- Full name: Dane Mathew Campbell
- Born: 26 February 1983 (age 43) Brisbane, Queensland, Australia

Playing information
- Height: 177 cm (5 ft 10 in)
- Weight: 83 kg (13 st 1 lb)
- Position: Halfback
Club
Years	Team	Pld	T	G	FG	P
2005	Newcastle Knights	6	0	6	0	12

Coaching information
Representative
Years	Team	Gms	W	D	L	W%
2012	Vanuatu	1	0	0	1	0
2025	Singapore	2	2	0	0	100

Dane Campbell (born 26 February 1983) is an Australian former professional rugby league footballer of the 2000s who is currently the recruitment manager for the Perth Bears in the National Rugby League and head coach of the Singapore national team.

As a player, Campbell played as a halfback for the Newcastle Knights in the NRL. Following his retirement from playing, Campbell has been employed as a player recruiter by several NRL clubs, and was a prominent contributor to the introduction of rugby league to Jamaica, Vanuatu, and Singapore, including the formation of their respective national teams.

== Background ==
Born in Brisbane, Queensland, Campbell played his junior rugby league for the Pine Rivers Bears and Redcliffe Dolphins.

He attended St Joseph's College, Nudgee before being signed by the Brisbane Broncos.

== Playing career ==
In 2000, Campbell represented the Queensland under-17 team. In 2002, Campbell played for Redcliffe in the Queensland Cup before being signed by the North Queensland Cowboys. In 2004, he joined the Easts Tigers, starting at halfback in their Grand Final loss to the Burleigh Bears.

In 2005, Campbell signed with the Newcastle Knights. In Round 9 of the 2005 NRL season, he made his NRL debut in the Knights' 2–32 loss to the Sydney Roosters. He played six games for the club, kicking six goals, before departing at the end of the season.

After leaving the Knights, Campbell served as player-coach of the Noosa Pirates before retiring as a player in 2010 due to a head injury.

== Post-playing career ==
In 2004, while still an active player, Campbell helped establish the West Indies national rugby league team, who played one international game against South Africa. This subsequently led to the formation of the Jamaica Rugby League Association and the Jamaica national rugby league team.

In 2010, he took over as owner and chief administrator of Hurricanes Rugby League, a rugby league team based in Jamaica.

In 2011, Campbell became one of the founders of the Vanuatu national rugby league team. On 20 October 2012, he coached the side in their first international, a 14–26 loss to Greece in Port Vila.

In 2016, he joined the Melbourne Storm as a recruitment officer and pathways manager. In November 2020, Campbell left the Storm, joining the North Queensland Cowboys as a recruitment officer.

In September 2025, Campbell joined the Perth Bears as their recruitment manager ahead of their inaugural season in the NRL in 2027.

Campbell founded the Singapore Rugby League and coached the Singapore national team in their international debut at the 2025 Rugby League Asian Championships. Singapore won the tournament with victories over Japan and the Philippines.
