= Aaron Douglas (rugby league) =

Australian rugby league footballer

Playing information
- Position: Wing
Club
Years	Team	Pld	T	G	FG	P
1998	Gold Coast Chargers	5	3	0	0	12
- Source: RLP As of 19 December 2020

Aaron Douglas is an Australian former professional rugby league footballer who played in the 1990s.

He played as a winger for the Gold Coast Chargers in 1998.

== Playing career ==
In 1996, Douglas was a member of the Redcliffe Dolphins inaugural Queensland Cup squad. On 31 August 1996, he started on the wing in the Dolphins' Grand Final loss to the Toowoomba Clydesdales. In 1997, he started on the wing in their 18–16 Grand Final win over the Easts Tigers.

In 1998, Douglas joined the Gold Coast Chargers in the National Rugby League. In Round 2 of the 1998 NRL season, he made his NRL debut in a 12–14 loss to the Parramatta Eels. In Round 3, he scored his first try in a 4–18 loss to the Canberra Raiders.

In 1999, after the Chargers folded, Douglas joined the Burleigh Bears in the Queensland Cup. He finished the season as the competition's top try scorer and started on the wing in their 12–10 Grand Final win over Redcliffe. In doing so, he became the first player to win two Queensland Cup premierships. On 16 October 1999, he started on the wing for Burleigh in their 6–10 loss to Great Britain on their tour of Australia.
