= Teaghan Hartigan =

Fiji international rugby league footballer

Personal information
- Born: Teaghan Laing; 27 November 1995 (age 30) Campbelltown, New South Wales, Australia
- Height: 172 cm (5 ft 8 in)
- Weight: 77 kg (12 st 2 lb)

Playing information
- Position: Centre, Second-row, Five-eighth
Club
Years	Team	Pld	T	G	FG	P
2020–	New Zealand Warriors	2	0	0	0	0
Representative
Years	Team	Pld	T	G	FG	P
2019–	Fiji	5	1	0	0	4
- Source: RLP As of 8 November 2026
- Father: Aseri Laing

Teaghan Hartigan (née Laing; born 27 November 1995) is an Australian rugby league footballer who plays as a centre for the New Zealand Warriors in the NRL Women's Premiership, the Burleigh Bears in the QRL Women's Premiership and has represented Fiji.

== Background ==
Hartigan was born in Campbelltown, New South Wales and played her junior rugby league for the Currumbin Eagles.

Her father, Aseri Laing, played for the Western Suburbs Magpies and Melbourne Storm in the National Rugby League (NRL).

== Playing career ==
In 2019, Hartigan played for the Tweed Heads Seagulls in the Southeast Queensland Division 1 competition. On 22 June 2019, Hartigan made her Test debut for Fiji, starting at five-eighth and scoring a try in their 28–0 win over Papua New Guinea.

=== 2020 ===
In 2020, Hartigan joined the Burleigh Bears QRL Women's Premiership team, starting at centre in their Holcim Cup Grand Final win over the Souths Logan Magpies.

On 18 September, Hartigan joined the New Zealand Warriors NRL Women's Premiership team. In Round 1 of the 2020 NRL Women's season, she made her debut for the Warriors, starting at centre in a 14–28 loss to the Brisbane Broncos.
