= Hurricanes Rugby League =

Jamaican rugby league club, based in Spanish Town, Jamaica

Club information
- Full name: Hurricanes Rugby League Football Club
- Nickname(s): The Canes, Hurricanes, Jamaica
- Founded: 2010; 16 years ago

Current details
- Ground: N/A (N/A)
- CEO: Dane Campbell
- Coach: Roy Calvert
- Competition: N/A

Hurricanes Rugby League are a Jamaican rugby league football team. Formed in 2011 with the intention of becoming Jamaica's first professional rugby league team, they hope to play in one of the domestic competitions in the United States by 2013.

== History ==
The Hurricanes Rugby League were officially launched on the 26 February 2011 at GC Forster College, Spanish Town, Jamaica. The Hurricanes' aim to create a professional rugby league team to compete in one of the domestic competitions in the United States, the American National Rugby League (AMNRL) or the USA Rugby League (USARL) by 2013. The team was founded by Australian Dane Campbell, a former player for the Newcastle Knights of the National Rugby League (NRL). Campbell is the sole owner of the franchise.

In 2012 the Hurricanes hosted the USA Rugby League club the Washington D.C. Slayers in Kingston in the first ever international club match on Jamaican soil. The Hurricanes the preseason matchup 66-29.

The Hurricanes Rugby League Academy will also train school aged players between 14–19 years of age in the hope of developing them into full-time professionals.

== Notable players ==
- Tyronie Rowe
