= Nick Shaw (rugby league) =

Australian former professional rugby league footballer

Personal information
- Full name: Nick Shaw
- Born: 1 July 1978 (age 46); Sydney, New South Wales, Australia

Playing information
- Position: Five-eighth
Club
| Years | Team | Pld | T | G | FG | P |
|---|---|---|---|---|---|---|
| 1999 | North Sydney Bears | 1 | 0 | 0 | 0 | 0 |
| 1999 | Balmain Tigers | 1 | 0 | 0 | 0 | 0 |
| | Total | 2 | 0 | 0 | 0 | 0 |

Nick Shaw (born 1 July 1978) is an Australian former professional rugby league footballer who played as a five-eighth for the North Sydney Bears and the Balmain Tigers in the NRL in 1999.

== Playing career ==
Shaw made his first grade debut from the bench in his side's 28−16 loss to the Sydney City Roosters at the Sydney Football Stadium in round 7 of the 1999 NRL season. This would be his only first grade appearance at the North Sydney Bears, as midway through the 1999 season, Shaw was released by Norths and subsequently joined the Balmain Tigers where he would play out the remainder of the season. His lone first grade appearance for Balmain came in his side's 22−12 loss to the South Sydney Rabbitohs at the Sydney Football Stadium in round 19 of the 1999 season.

Shaw was left out of the side for Balmain's final ever first grade game against the Canberra Raiders at Bruce Stadium. Balmain controversially merged with rivals the Western Suburbs Magpies to form the Wests Tigers as part of the NRL's rationalization strategy. Shaw was not offered a contract to play with the newly formed team for the 2000 NRL season and subsequently never played first grade rugby league again.

After his departure from Balmain, Shaw went on to play for the Burleigh Bears in the Queensland Cup competition.
