= Craig Freer =

Australian rugby league footballer

Personal information
- Full name: Craig Freer
- Born: 21 January 1975 (age 51) Sydney, New South Wales, Australia
- Height: 182 cm (6 ft 0 in)
- Weight: 94 kg (14 st 11 lb)

Playing information
- Position: Five-eighth
Club
Years	Team	Pld	T	G	FG	P
1994–95	Parramatta Eels	7	0	0	0	0
1997	Balmain Tigers	2	0	2	0	2
	Total	9	0	2	0	2
- Source: As of 18 January 2019

Craig Freer is an Australian former rugby league footballer who played for Parramatta and Balmain.

Freer played for the Burleigh Bears in the 1998 and 1999 winning the Qld cup.
