= Jason Williams (rugby league, born 1981) =

New Zealand rugby league footballer

Personal information
- Born: 21 January 1981 (age 45) Auckland, New Zealand

Playing information
- Position: Prop
Club
| Years | Team | Pld | T | G | FG | P |
|---|---|---|---|---|---|---|
| 2004 | Cronulla Sharks | 6 | 0 | 0 | 0 | 0 |
| 2005–06 | Canberra Raiders | 16 | 1 | 0 | 0 | 4 |
| | Total | 22 | 1 | 0 | 0 | 4 |
- Source: As of 26 March 2009
- Boxing career
- Nationality: New Zealand
- Weight: Heavyweight

Boxing record
- Total fights: 2
- Wins: 1
- Win by KO: 1
- Losses: 1

Jason Williams (born 21 January 1981) is a New Zealand rugby league footballer and heavyweight boxer who currently plays for the Glenora Bears in the Auckland Rugby League. His position of choice is at prop.

== Early years ==
Williams was born in Auckland, New Zealand, he attended Mount Albert Grammar and represented the New Zealand Secondary Schools and the Junior Kiwis in 1998.

He then played for the Marist Richmond Brothers in the Bartercard Cup.

== Playing career ==
Williams signed with the Cronulla Sharks in 2004. However he was charged with an assault on teammate Jeremy Smith, who was left with a fractured cheekbone, he was remanded in custody without bail for 4 months but then got bail in the Supreme Courts and later had the charges dropped with no conviction. Williams was released after just over three months due to good behaviour and decided to take up boxing.

However Canberra Raiders general manager Don Furner offered him a contract and Williams ended up playing three seasons with the Raiders between 2005/06/07.

Williams then joined the Wynnum Manly Seagulls in the Queensland Cup for the 2008/2009 seasons before joining the East Tigers. At the time the Seagulls and Easts were a feeder club to the Brisbane Broncos.

== Later years and Boxing ==
Williams returned to Sydney from Queensland to focus on a boxing career. His first professional fight was in 2010 when he lost to John Szigeti at the Gold Coast Convention Centre on 4 December.

In 2011 Williams returned to New Zealand and joined the Te Atatu Roosters in the Auckland Rugby League competition before leaving the club and joining the Glenora Bears. In June Williams appeared on the undercard of the Sonny Bill Williams' Clash for Canterbury. Williams defeated his opponent, Kris O'Neil, by knock-out in the second round.
