= Trent Leis =

Australian rugby league footballer

Personal information
- Born: 18 November 1977 (age 48) Brisbane, Queensland, Australia
- Height: 180 cm (5 ft 11 in)
- Weight: 80 kg (12 st 8 lb)

Playing information
- Position: Wing, Fullback
Club
Years	Team	Pld	T	G	FG	P
2001	North Qld Cowboys	17	5	21	0	62
Representative
Years	Team	Pld	T	G	FG	P
2004	Queensland Residents	1	1	2	0	8
- Source: As of 8 January 2024

Trent Leis (/liːs/) (born 18 November 1977) is an Australian former professional rugby league footballer who played as a winger and fullback for the North Queensland Cowboys in the NRL.

== Playing career ==
A Dayboro Cowboys junior, Leis made his Queensland Cup debut for the Redcliffe Dolphins in 1998. In 1999, he played in the Dolphins' Grand Final loss to the Burleigh Bears. A year later, he started on the wing in the Dolphins' 14–6 Grand Final win over the Toowoomba Clydesdales. He signed with the North Queensland Cowboys for the 2001 season.

In Round 1 of the 2001 NRL season, Leis made his NRL debut in the Cowboys' 17–18 loss to the Brisbane Broncos. He played 17 games for the Cowboys in his rookie season, starting 10 on the wing and seven at fullback, scoring five tries and kicking 21 goals.

In 2002, Leis re-signed with the Redcliffe Dolphins, representing Queensland Residents and starting at fullback in their Grand Final win over the Ipswich Jets. In 2005, Leis signed with the Burleigh Bears. He played in his fourth Queensland Cup Grand Final that season, starting in the centres in Burleigh's loss to the North Queensland Young Guns. That season, he was named on the wing in the Queensland Rugby League's Queensland Cup Team of the Decade.

In 2007, Leis again returned to the Redcliffe Dolphins, retiring at the end of that season. He ended his Queensland Cup career with 70 tries and 34 goals from 111 games.

== Statistics ==
=== NRL ===
Statistics are correct to the end of the 2001 season

Season	Team	Matches	T	G	GK %	F/G	Pts
2001	North Queensland	17	5	21	72.4%	0	62
Career totals		17	5	21	72.4%	0	62

== Personal life ==
Leis' father, Peter, played centre for the Redcliffe Dolphins in the 1970s and 80s and represented Queensland seven times from 1974–77. The Dolphins annual Player of the Year medal is named in his honour.
