= Asena Rokomarama =

Fijian dual-code rugby player

Personal information
- Born: 2 May 1996 (age 29)
- Height: 1.60 m (5 ft 3 in)
- Weight: 58 kg (128 lb; 9 st 2 lb)

Playing information

Rugby union
- Position: Wing
Representative
Years	Team	Pld	T	G	FG	P
	Fiji

Rugby league
- Position: Wing
Representative
Years	Team	Pld	T	G	FG	P
2023–	Fiji	1	0	0	0	0

Asena Rokomarama (born May 1, 1996) is a Fijian rugby league and rugby sevens player. She was selected as a member of the Fiji women's national rugby sevens team to the 2016 Summer Olympics & Fiji at rugby league in the 2023 Rugby League Pacific Championships.
