= Roela Radiniyavuni =

Fiji dual-code rugby international footballer

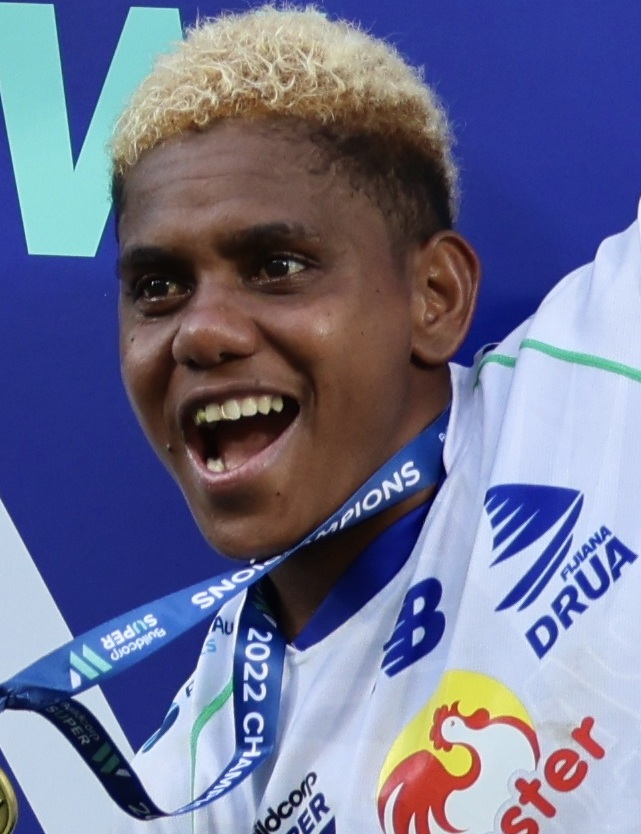
- Radiniyavuni in 2022

Personal information
- Born: 7 April 1990 (age 36) Suva, Fiji
- Height: 1.67 m (5 ft 6 in)
- Weight: 69 kg (152 lb; 10 st 12 lb)

Playing information
- Position: Wing
Club
Years	Team	Pld	T	G	FG	P
2019	New Zealand Warriors	1	0	0	0	0
Representative
Years	Team	Pld	T	G	FG	P
2019	Fiji	1	1	0	0	4
- Source: RLP As of 14 November 2020

Rugby union career
Senior career
Years	Team	Apps	(Points)
2022	Fijiana Drua	5	(0)
International career
Years	Team	Apps	(Points)
2016–Present	Fiji	4	(0)
National sevens team
Years	Team		Comps
- Fiji
Medals
Representing Fiji
Women's rugby sevens
Olympic Games
Bronze medal – third place	2020 Tokyo	Team competition

Roela Radiniyavuni (born 7 April 1990) is a Fijian rugby league and rugby union footballer who played for the New Zealand Warriors in the NRL Women's Premiership.

Primarily a winger, Radiniyavuni has represented Fiji in rugby league, rugby union and rugby sevens.

== Biography ==
Born in Suva, Radiniyavuni represented Fiji in rugby union and rugby sevens before switching to rugby league in 2019.

=== Rugby league career ===
In 2019, Radiniyavuni relocated to Auckland, New Zealand and began playing rugby league for the Richmond Roses. On 22 June 2019, she represented Fiji, starting on the wing and scoring a try in a 28–0 win over Papua New Guinea.

In July 2019, she represented the Akarana Falcons at the NZRL Women's National Tournament. On 10 July 2019, Radiniyavuni joined the New Zealand Warriors NRL Women's Premiership team.

In Round 2 of the 2019 NRL Women's season, Radiniyavuni made her debut for the Warriors in a 6–26 loss to the St George Illawarra Dragons.

=== Rugby union career ===
In November 2019, Radiniyavuni returned to rugby sevens, rejoining the Fijian national team. She competed at the 2020 Summer Olympics. She won a bronze medal at the event.

Radiniyavuni was named in the Fijiana Drua squad for the 2022 Super W season.

In 2022, Radiniyavuni was named in the Fijiana squad for two test matches against Australia and Japan. She started in the game against Japan and scored a try in the 29th minute. She also started in the test against Australia.

Radiniyavuni was named on the bench in the warm up match against Canada ahead of the World Cup. She was selected for the Fijiana squad to the 2021 Rugby World Cup in New Zealand.
