= Danny McAllister (rugby league) =

Australian rugby league footballer

Personal information
- Born: 21 December 1974 (age 50)

Playing information
- Position: Prop, Second-row
Club
Years	Team	Pld	T	G	FG	P
1995–97	Sheffield Eagles	30	12	0	0	48
1998	Gold Coast Chargers	16	1	0	0	4
1999	Gateshead Thunder	6	1	0	0	4
2003	South Sydney	1	0	0	0	0
	Total	53	14	0	0	56
Representative
Years	Team	Pld	T	G	FG	P
2003	Queensland Residents	1	1	0	0	4

Danny McAllister (born 21 December 1974) is an Australian former professional rugby league footballer who played for Gold Coast and South Sydney in the National Rugby League (NRL). He also played for the Sheffield Eagles and Gateshead Thunder in England.

== Playing career ==
A forward, McAllister started his professional rugby league career in England, playing for the Sheffield Eagles from 1995 to 1997.

McAllister debuted in the NRL in 1998 at the Gold Coast Chargers and made 16 first-grade appearance that season, which was the club's last in the competition.

In 1999, he returned to England to play for Gateshead.

Over the next three years, McAllister competed in the Queensland Cup, for Ipswich and Wynnum-Manly.

Midway through the 2003 NRL season, while still with Ipswich, he was recruited into South Sydney's league side, to become the club's 1000th first-grade player.
