= Shaun Berrigan =

Australia international rugby league footballer

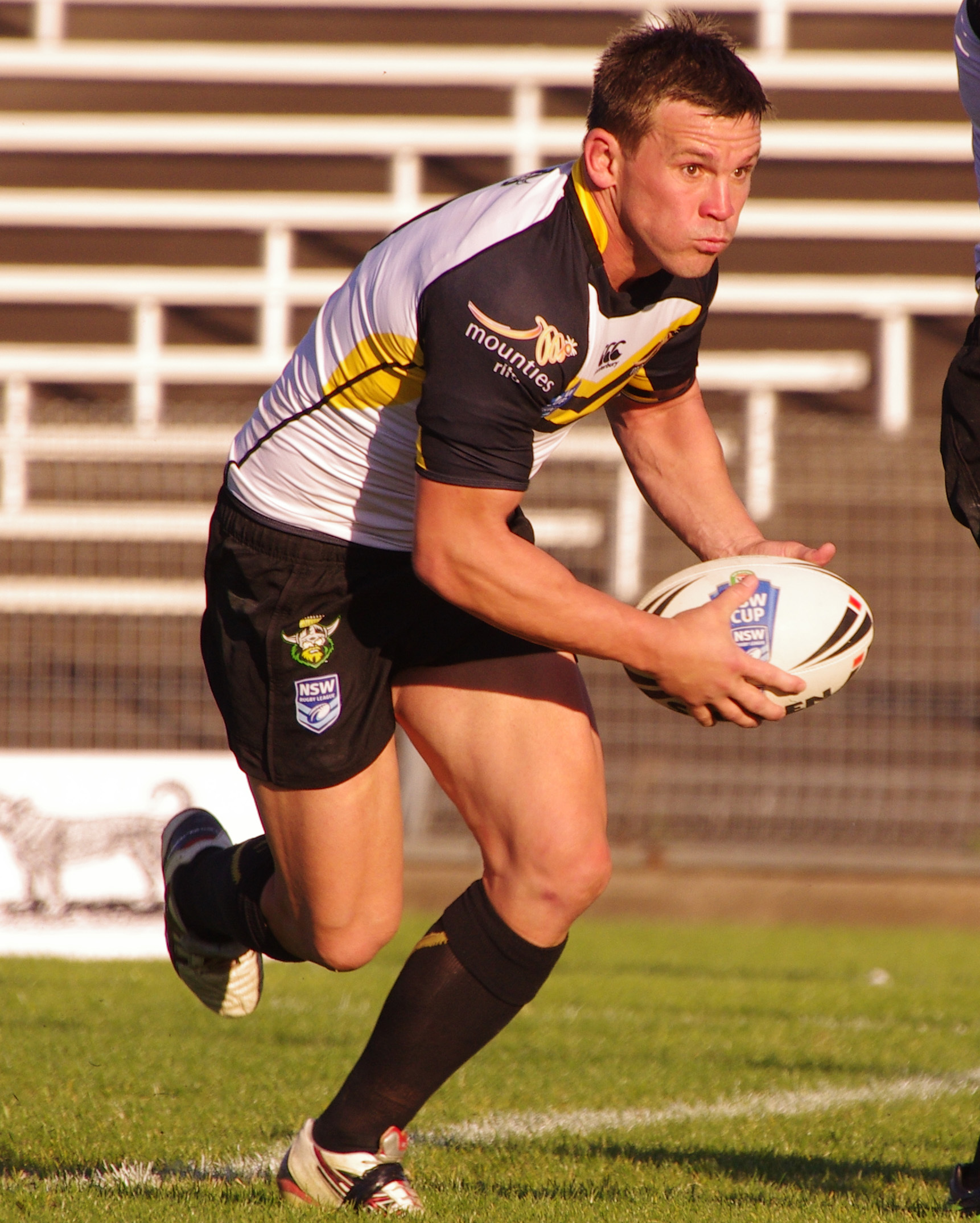

Personal information
- Born: 4 November 1978 (age 48) Brisbane, Queensland, Australia

Playing information
- Height: 178 cm (5 ft 10 in)
- Weight: 87 kg (13 st 10 lb)
- Position: Hooker, Centre, Halfback, Five-eighth
Club
Years	Team	Pld	T	G	FG	P
1999–07	Brisbane Broncos	186	77	0	0	308
2008–10	Hull FC	74	12	0	0	48
2011	New Zealand Warriors	19	6	0	0	24
2012–13	Canberra Raiders	36	3	0	0	12
	Total	315	98	0	0	392
Representative
Years	Team	Pld	T	G	FG	P
2002–07	Queensland	15	2	0	0	8
2004–07	Australia	14	2	1	0	10
- Relatives: Barry Berrigan (brother)

Shaun Berrigan (born 4 November 1978) is an Australian former professional rugby league footballer who played as a hooker, centre, halfback and five-eighth in the 1990s, 2000s, and 2010s.

He played for the Brisbane Broncos, with whom he won the 2000 and 2006 NRL Grand Final, and the New Zealand Warriors and the Canberra Raiders in the National Rugby League. He also played for Hull FC in the Super League. Berrigan played for Queensland in the State of Origin series and Australia at international level.

== Background ==
Berrigan was born in Brisbane, Queensland, Australia on 4 November 1978. He is of Italian and German descent. His brother Barry was also a fellow professional, with whom he played in the Toowoomba Rugby League competition for Dalby Diehards in the 2014 season.

== Playing career ==
=== Brisbane Broncos ===
Berrigan made his premiership début for the Brisbane Broncos in Round 11 of the 1999 NRL season against the Balmain Tigers, making eleven appearances during the remainder of the aforementioned NRL season. In the following season in 2000, Berrigan played from the interchange bench in the Broncos' 2000 NRL Grand Final victory over the Sydney Roosters. Having won the 2000 NRL Premiership, the Broncos traveled to England to play against 2000's Super League V Champions, St Helens R.F.C. for the 2001 World Club Challenge, with Berrigan playing at five-eighth and scoring a try in Brisbane's loss. Berrigan's regular position was centre but he could play a number of back-line positions as well as hooker. Berrigan's versatility is evident in analysing the Queensland team for which Berrigan was the five-eighth for the entire 2002 State of Origin series. He played the entire 2003 State of Origin series at halfback for Queensland, who lost. He played in the centres for the 2004 State of Origin series. Berrigan was selected in the Australian team to go and compete in the end of season 2004 Rugby League Tri-Nations tournament. In the final against Great Britain he played at centre in the Kangaroos' 44–4 victory.

Berrigan was then the top try-scorer for the 2005 Brisbane Broncos season scoring 19 tries. Berrigan played his 150th first grade game for the club in 2006. He started the year in the centre position but injuries to the Broncos' full-time hookers, Michael Ennis and Shaun's brother Barry, made coach Wayne Bennett move Berrigan to hooker. This turned out to be a success, with former great Peter Sterling saying that it bought a new dimension to the Broncos' game not seen for a while. He played so well at hooker in the Broncos' 2006 NRL Grand Final victory over Melbourne that he was awarded the Clive Churchill Medal for best on field. Berrigan was superb from dummy half, but also shut down Melbourne Storm super-star Greg Inglis for the entire match. He was later selected in the 2006 Tri-Nations side for Australia and played in the final which Australia won. In the 2006 and 2007 Origin series Berrigan has been the utility back for Queensland on the bench, playing the majority of these games as Hooker when Cameron Smith was off the field. As 2006 NRL Premiers, the Brisbane Broncos travelled to England to face 2006 Super League champions, St Helens R.F.C. in the 2007 World Club Challenge. Berrigan played at hooker in the Broncos' 14–18 loss.

Berrigan was selected to play for the Australian national team from the interchange bench in the 2007 ANZAC Test match victory against New Zealand. During the 2007 NRL season, at the Broncos' 20-year anniversary celebration, the club announced a list of the 20 best players to play for them to date which included Berrigan. Berrigan's Brisbane contract ended at the end of the 2007 season.

Berrigan was a regular representative player, appearing twelve times in the State of Origin for the Queensland Maroons and in five test matches for Australia.

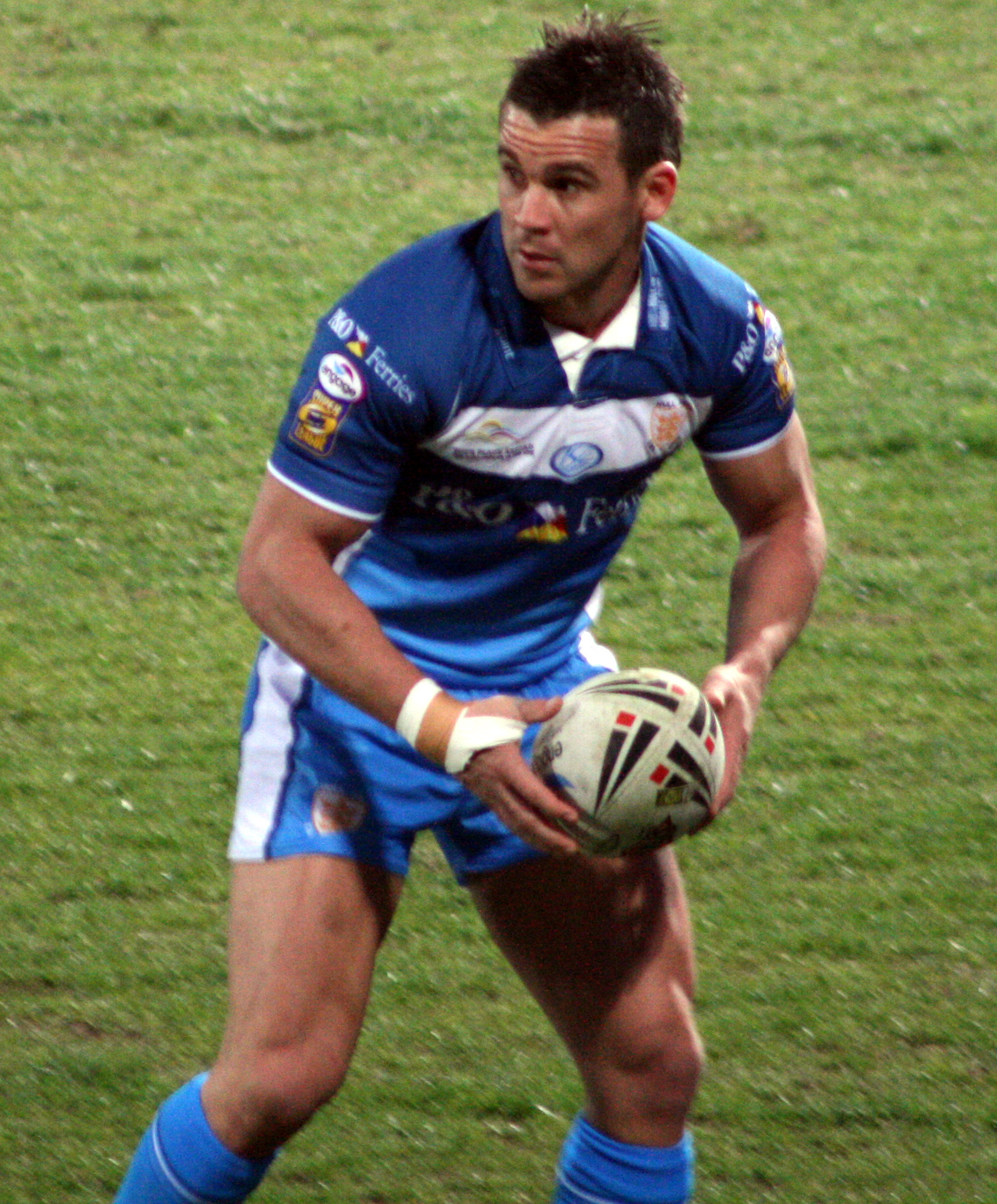
Berrigan playing for Hull F.C. in 2008

=== Hull FC ===
Berrigan signed a four-year deal with English Super League team and 2006 Grand Final runners up, Hull FC. His contract commenced with the start of the 2008 season when he replaced former Broncos teammate Richard Swain, who retired from the game at the end of the 2007 season, thus freeing up a free quota space.

In regards to the signing, Berrigan said "I have had a fantastic career at the Broncos, winning premierships, playing for Queensland and of course for Australia. I am really excited to be joining Hull and playing in the Super League and Challenge Cup. I am excited by their plans, I believe the club has a fantastic future and I am looking forward to being a part of it for the next 4 years".

Berrigan scored his first try for new club Hull in Round 2 of 2008's Super League XIII. On 30 August Shaun Berrigan appeared for Hull at Wembley in the 2008 Challenge Cup Final. During his Hull career Berrigan continued to play at hooker.

=== New Zealand Warriors ===
At the start of 2011, Berrigan secured a release from Hull so he could move to be closer to his family following the death of his father in 2010. After being linked with the North Queensland Cowboys and Gold Coast Titans, Berrigan signed a one-year deal with the New Zealand Warriors for the 2011 season. During the 2011 NRL season, Berrigan played from the bench and at centre, although he did not play in their grand final loss against Manly.

=== Canberra Raiders ===
On 19 October 2011, the Canberra Raiders announced they had signed Berrigan on a one-year contract for the 2012 season with the option for an extension.

He announced his retirement at the end of the 2013 NRL season.

== Post playing ==
After retiring from the sport in 2013, Berrigan had moved to work in the mines. In 2023, Berrigan was a member of the FOGS (Former Origin Greats) side that played the Queensland Police Service Rugby League Association.

== Statistics ==
=== NRL / Super league ===
Year	Team	Games	Tries	Pts
1999	Brisbane Broncos	12	4	16
2000	Brisbane Broncos	23	4	16
2001	Brisbane Broncos	18	8	32
2002	Brisbane Broncos	25	10	40
2003	Brisbane Broncos	24	10	40
2004	Brisbane Broncos	16	9	36
2005	Brisbane Broncos	24	19	76
2006	Brisbane Broncos	26	9	36
2007	Brisbane Broncos	18	4	16
2008	Hull FC	29	7	28
2009	Hull FC	22	4	16
2010	Hull FC	23	1	4
2011	New Zealand Warriors	19	6	24
2012	Canberra Raiders	23	2	8
2013	Canberra Raiders	13	1	4
	Totals	315	98	392

Preceded by Scott Prince (Wests Tigers)	Clive Churchill Medallist; 2006	Succeeded by Greg Inglis (Melbourne Storm)
