= Adam Hayden =

Australian rugby league player

Personal information
- Born: 5 March 1977 (age 49) Sydney, New South Wales, Australia

Playing information
- Position: Five-eighth
Club
Years	Team	Pld	T	G	FG	P
1997–98	Sydney City Roosters	8	2	0	0	8
1999	Manly Sea Eagles	13	3	2	0	16
2000	Northern Eagles	6	0	0	0	0
	Total	27	5	2	0	24
Representative
Years	Team	Pld	T	G	FG	P
2005	Queensland Residents	1	1	0	0	4
- Source: As of 8 January 2024

Adam Hayden (born 5 March 1977) is an Australian former professional rugby league footballer who played for the Sydney City Roosters, Manly Sea Eagles, and Northern Eagles. His position of choice was five-eighth.

== Playing career ==
Hayden was graded by the Sydney City Roosters in 1996. He made his first grade debut at five eighth as a replacement for Brad Fittler in his side's 18−6 loss to the Parramatta Eels at the Sydney Football Stadium in round 14 of the 1997 season. Hayden played 2 seasons with the Roosters, but could not establish himself as a regular in the team, playing only 8 games in his 2 seasons with the club. Hayden's stint with Roosters ended at the conclusion of the 1998 season.

In 1999, Hayden joined the Manly Sea Eagles. He played 13 games with the Sea Eagles before they controversially merged with rivals the North Sydney Bears to form the Northern Eagles as part of the NRL's rationalization strategy.

In 2000, Hayden joined the newly formed Northern Eagles, he was left out of the side for their first ever first grade game against the Newcastle Knights at North Power Stadium in which the Eagles won 24−14. Hayden played 6 games with the Northern Eagles. His final game of first grade came in his side's 22−20 loss to the Sydney Roosters at North Power Stadium in round 18 of the 2000 season. After a disappointing season in which the Eagles finished in 12th position, winning only 9 of their 26 games, Hayden was released by the club at season's end and subsequently never played first grade rugby league again. In total, Hayden played 27 games, scored 5 tries, and kicked 2 goals.
