= Brothers-Valleys =

Defunct Australian rugby league club, based in Brisbane, QLD

Club information
- Full name: Brothers-Valleys Rugby League Football Club
- Nickname: The Leprechauns
- Colours: Dark blue, royal blue and white
- Founded: 2002; 24 years ago
- Exited: 2004; 22 years ago

Former details
- Ground: Perry Park, O'Callaghan Park
- Competition: Queensland Cup, Brisbane A-Grade Rugby League
- 2015: 3rd
- Current season

Brothers-Valleys were a rugby league team formed from a merger between the Brothers and Fortitude Valley Diehards teams in 2002. The team debuted in a pre-season match against St George-Illawarra in 2002, and for the next two seasons competed in the Brisbane A Grade Mixwell Cup and Mixwell Colts competitions, playing out of Perry Park in Mayne, Brisbane. In 2004 they moved to O'Callaghan Park in Zillmere and were accepted into the Queensland Cup, but in a year of poor performances both on and off the field they failed to win a single game and only managed a draw against the Souths Logan Magpies.

On 22 November 2004 the Queensland Rugby League announced that:

The only club not participating in 2005 will be Brothers Valleys Diehards. While the QRL acknowledges the rich history associated with the organisation, the club’s inability to meet specified guidelines has resulted in this situation. Avenues remain open for the club to apply to be part of lower grade competitions in the South East Division.

== Results ==
=== Queensland Cup ===
- 2004: 12th
