= Trent Young =

Australian rugby league footballer (born 1979)

Personal information
- Full name: Trent Young
- Born: 8 September 1979 (age 45); Brisbane, Queensland, Australia

Playing information
- Position: Five-eighth, Hooker
Club
| Years | Team | Pld | T | G | FG | P |
|---|---|---|---|---|---|---|
| 2005–06 | South Sydney | 15 | 1 | 0 | 0 | 4 |

Trent Young is an Australian former professional rugby league footballer who played as a five-eighth and hooker for the South Sydney Rabbitohs in the NRL.

== Playing career ==
He made his first-grade début in the 2005 NRL season, when he started at five-eighth for South Sydney in a 46–14 loss away to New Zealand Warriors in round four of that year's competition.

He went on to play eight times that season, scoring once in a 21–21 draw with the Canterbury-Bankstown Bulldogs. He continued his run in the side in 2006, playing seven times, but then dropped out of first-grade contention, instead playing for South's VB New South Wales Premier League side. Souths would finish the 2006 NRL season bottom of the table.

In 2007, he left Souths for Easts Tigers in the Queensland Cup.
