= Patricia Raikadroka =

Fiji international rugby league player

Personal information
- Born: 22 June 1993 (age 32) Camperdown, New South Wales, Australia
- Height: 164 cm (5 ft 5 in)
- Weight: 67 kg (10 st 8 lb)

Playing information
- Position: Centre
Club
Years	Team	Pld	T	G	FG	P
2020–	New Zealand Warriors	0	0	0	0	0
Representative
Years	Team	Pld	T	G	FG	P
2018	Prime Minister's XIII	1	0	0	0	0
2019	Fiji	3	5	0	0	20
- As of 24 May 2026

Patricia Raikadroka (born 22 June 1993) is an Australian rugby league footballer who plays for the New Zealand Warriors in the NRL Women's Premiership. She primarily plays as a centre.

== Playing career ==
Raikadroka is a development player for the Warriors in the NRLW. She made her international debut for Fiji in 2019.
