= Royce Simms =

Australian rugby league footballer

Personal information
- Born: 18 April 1978 (age 46)

Playing information
- Position: Hooker
Club
Years	Team	Pld	T	G	FG	P
2001	Canterbury Bankstown	2	0	0	0	0

Royce Simms (born 18 April 1978) is an Australian former professional rugby league footballer who played for Canterbury Bankstown in the National Rugby League.

Simms came to Canterbury from Logan City in Queensland.

A hooker, Simms made two first-grade appearances in the 2001 NRL season. Simms debuted in the Canterbury round 14 win over the Melbourne Storm and played again the following round in a loss to Canberra.
