= David Seage =

Australian rugby league footballer

Personal information
- Born: 29 November 1979 (age 46) Brisbane, Queensland, Australia

Playing information
- Position: Fullback, Wing
Club
Years	Team	Pld	T	G	FG	P
2004–06	Newcastle Knights	16	5	0	0	20
- Source: As of 8 February 2019

David Seage (born 29 November 1979) is an Australian former professional rugby league footballer who last played for the Wynnum Manly Seagulls in the Queensland Cup. He previously played for the Newcastle Knights in the National Rugby League but was sidelined for most of his time there due to a horrific injury toll.

== Background ==
He is related to a large range of Seages located around Australia, mostly in Queensland and NSW. Some Seage relatives are located in Redcliffe, and Bundaberg, in Queensland, and in NSW, suburbs on the North Shore of Sydney including, Killara, St Ives, Wahroonga, and Manly.

== Playing career ==
Seage made his first grade debut for Newcastle in round 1 of the 2004 NRL season against Penrith at Penrith Park.

In the 2005 NRL season, Seage was limited to only five games for Newcastle as the club finished last.

In the 2006 NRL season, he played 8 games for the club including their qualifying final victory over Manly-Warringah in the 2006 finals series.

Seage is the Wynnum Manly Seagulls leading try scorer of all time. He scored a total of 78 tries in 138 games for the club in the Queensland Cup.
