= David Hicks (rugby league) =

Australian rugby league footballer

Personal information
- Full name: David Hicks
- Born: 10 October 1978 (age 46)

Playing information
- Position: Prop
Club
Years	Team	Pld	T	G	FG	P
1999	North Sydney Bears	5	0	0	0	0

David Hicks (born 10 October 1978) is an Australian former professional rugby league footballer who played as a prop for the North Sydney Bears in the NRL in 1999.

== Playing career ==
Hicks made his first grade debut from the bench in his side's 28−20 loss to the Sydney City Roosters in round 19 of the 1999 season. He played in 4 more games for the North Sydney club in the 1999 NRL season and was left out of the side for Norths final ever first grade game against the North Queensland Cowboys in Townsville. Norths controversially merged with rivals the Manly Warringah Sea Eagles to form the Northern Eagles as part of the NRL's rationalization strategy. Hicks was not offered a contract to play with the newly formed team for the 2000 NRL season and subsequently never played first grade rugby league again.
