= Mick Roberts =

Australian rugby league footballer

Personal information
- Full name: Michael Roberts
- Born: 1 June 1979 (age 47) Brisbane, Queensland, Australia

Playing information
- Height: 174 cm (5 ft 9 in)
- Weight: 90 kg (14 st 2 lb)
- Position: Hooker
Club
Years	Team	Pld	T	G	FG	P
2007–08	Brisbane Broncos	5	0	0	0	0
2009–11	Villeneuve Leopards	20	3	0	1	0
	Total	25	3	0	1	0
Representative
Years	Team	Pld	T	G	FG	P
2006–07	Queensland Residents	2	0	0	0	0

Michael Roberts (born 1 June 1979) is an Australian former professional rugby league footballer who last played for the Villeneuve Leopards in the Elite One Championship in France. He played for the Brisbane Broncos in 2007 and trained with the full time squad in the same year until 2008. He played 241 first grade games for the Redcliffe Dolphins. Currently, he is a PE teacher.

== Playing career ==
Roberts played his first first-grade game for the Brisbane Broncos in 2007 after playing most of his career at the Queensland Cup team Redcliffe Dolphins. Hooker was his position of choice.

Roberts played in 241 games for the Redcliffe Dolphins in the Queensland Cup. He scored 71 tries and a total of 552 points.
