= Aseri Laing =

Fiji international rugby league footballer

Personal information
- Full name: Aseri Laing
- Born: 6 May 1975 (age 51) Mount Albert, New Zealand

Playing information
- Height: 185 cm (6 ft 1 in)
- Weight: 99 kg (15 st 8 lb)
- Position: Wing, Centre
Club
Years	Team	Pld	T	G	FG	P
1993–98	Western Suburbs Magpies	50	11	0	0	44
1999	Melbourne Storm	5	1	0	0	4
	Total	55	12	0	0	48
Representative
Years	Team	Pld	T	G	FG	P
2006–07	Fiji	2	0	0	0	0
- Relatives: Teaghan Hartigan (daughter)

Aseri Laing (born 6 May 1975), is a Fijian former professional rugby league footballer who played in the 1990s. He played for the Western Suburbs Magpies from 1993–94 and 1996–98 and then the Melbourne Storm in 1999.

== Early life ==
Born in Mt Albert, New Zealand to Fijian parents, Laing played his junior rugby league with Campbelltown City Kangaroos.

== Playing career ==
Joining Western Suburbs Magpies, playing in under age and reserve grade competitions, before making his first grade debut in 1994. Laing had a year off from rugby league in 1995, resuming his career with Wests in 1996. In the 1998 NRL season, he made a career-high 20 appearances in first grade.

Leaving Wests after the 1998 season, he joined Melbourne Storm, making a further five first grade appearances, scoring one try.

Laing later represented Fiji in 2006–07.
