= Scott Thorburn =

Australian rugby league footballer

Personal information
- Born: 24 January 1977 (age 48); Taree, New South Wales, Australia

Playing information
- Position: Five-eighth, Halfback
Club
Years	Team	Pld	T	G	FG	P
1997	South Queensland	1	0	0	0	0
1998	Gold Coast	9	0	7	0	14
2004	Hull Kingston Rovers	9	1	13	0	30
	Total	19	1	20	0	44

Scott Thorburn (born 24 January 1977) is an Australian former professional rugby league footballer who played in the 1990s for the South Queensland Crushers and Gold Coast Chargers.

== Background ==
Thorburn was born in the New South Wales town of Taree but played most of his football in Queensland.

== Playing career ==
Thorburn made one appearance for South Queensland in the 1997 ARL season, then nine for Gold Coast in the 1998 NRL season including the club's final ever game in first grade which was a 20-18 defeat against Cronulla.

While playing for Easts Tigers, Thorburn won the Queensland Cup's best and fairest award in the 2002 season. His post NRL career also included a stint in England with Hull Kingston Rovers.

== Post playing ==
Formerly a fireman by trade, Thornburn is based in Mackay, Queensland.
