= Barry Berrigan =

Australian rugby league footballer

Personal information
- Born: 6 June 1975 (age 51) Brisbane, Queensland, Australia

Playing information
- Height: 209 cm (6 ft 10 in)
- Weight: 115 kg (18 st 2 lb)
- Position: Hooker
Club
Years	Team	Pld	T	G	FG	P
1995–99	Canterbury Bulldogs	24	1	0	0	4
2003–05	Brisbane Broncos	32	6	0	0	24
	Total	56	7	0	0	28
Representative
Years	Team	Pld	T	G	FG	P
2003	Queensland Residents	1	1	0	0	4
- Relatives: Shaun Berrigan (brother)

Barry Berrigan (born 6 June 1975) is an Australian former professional rugby league footballer who played as a hooker the 1990s and 2000s.

He played for the Brisbane Broncos in the National Rugby League competition alongside his younger brother, Shaun Berrigan. He has 4 sons.

== Background ==
He was born in Brisbane, Queensland, Australia. He is of German descent.

== Career ==
Berrigan started his career with the Canterbury-Bankstown Bulldogs in 1995 where he remained until 1999. After a few stints in the Queensland Wizard Cup with Redcliffe and Toowoomba he linked with the Brisbane Broncos in 2003. He made 20 first grade appearances for them in 2005. Berrigan was forced to retire after Round 2 in 2006 citing ongoing neck problems. At the end of his career he played the 2008 season for his junior club Wests Mitchelton. This side included Paul Farrell, Clayton Sellars and Jack Muir. Barry will play alongside his brother Shaun for the Dalby Diehards in the Toowoomba rugby league competition in 2014.

== Career highlights ==
- Junior Club: Wests Mitchelton
- First Grade Debut: Round 10, Brisbane Broncos v. Illawarra at Steelers, 20 May 1995
