= Brian Jellick =

NZ international rugby league footballer

Personal information
- Full name: Brian Andrew Jellick
- Born: 9 October 1973 (age 52)

Playing information
- Position: Wing
Club
Years	Team	Pld	T	G	FG	P
1993–94	Glenora Bears
1995	Waitakere City	24	18	0	0	72
1997–0	Widnes Vikings	0	0	0	0	0
1999–01	North Qld Cowboys	48	15	0	0	60
2002–03	Limoux Grizzlies			0	0
	Total	72	33	0	0	132
Representative
Years	Team	Pld	T	G	FG	P
1998	New Zealand Māori
1999–00	New Zealand	3	6	0	0	24

Brian Andrew Jellick is a New Zealand former professional rugby league footballer who played in the 90s and 2000s. A New Zealand international representative winger, he played his club football in New Zealand, England and Australia for many years.

== Playing career ==
Brian Jellick played in the Auckland Rugby League competition with the Glenora Bears club. In 1995, Jellick played for the Waitakere City Raiders in the Lion Red Cup. Jellick was the recruited by English side the Widnes to play in the Super League in 1997. Jellick returned to New Zealand in 1998 and scored two tries for Glenora in the 1998 Fox Memorial grand final. Jellick represented Auckland in the 1998 domestic season.

Jellick signed with the North Queensland Cowboys and debuted during a 1999 NRL season game in New Zealand against the Auckland Warriors which the Cowboys won. Jellick spent three seasons with the club, playing in 48 games.

Jellick played for the Limoux Grizzlies in the 2002-03 French season.

=== Representative career ===
In 1998, Jellick was selected to tour the Cook Islands with the New Zealand Māori side.

In 1999, Jellick made his test début for New Zealand against Tonga. In this game, Jellick scored four tries for the Kiwis, the second highest amount in one match for a New Zealand side. Jellick played three tests for the Kiwis, including two matches at the 2000 World Cup.

== Later years ==
Following his departure from top-flight rugby league competition, Jellick remained in Queensland and continued playing for the Redcliffe Dolphins and later the Wynnum Manly Seagulls in the Queensland Cup. Jellick has since returned to New Zealand, continuing his association with rugby league by getting involved in junior coaching in Auckland with the Ponsonby Ponies
