= Burleigh Bears =

Australian rugby league club, based in Gold Coast, QLD

Club information
- Full name: Burleigh Heads Rugby League Football Club Ltd.
- Nickname: The Bears
- Colours: Maroon; White
- Founded: 1934; 92 years ago
- Website: burleighbearsrlfc.com

Current details
- Ground: UAA Park (5,000)
- CEO: Damian Driscoll
- Coach: Luke Burt
- Captain: Sami Sauiluma
- Competition: Queensland Cup
- 2025 season: Premiers

Records
- Premierships (2nd grade): 5 (1999, 2004, 2016, 2019, 2025)
- Runners-up (2nd grade): 3 (2003, 2005, 2023)
- Wooden spoons (2nd grade): 0
- Premierships (3rd grade): 2 (2006, 2015)
- Runners-up (3rd grade): 4 (2004, 2005, 2010, 2014)
- Most capped: 201 – Shane O'Flanagan
- Highest try scorer: 69 – Reggie Cressbrook
- Highest points scorer: 964 – Reggie Cressbrook

The Burleigh Bears are an Australian professional rugby league football club based in Gold Coast, Australia. They compete in Queensland's top rugby league competition, the Queensland Cup.

Since their admission to the competition in 1997, the club has appeared in six Grand Finals, winning four (1999, 2004, 2016 and 2019) and won the minor premiership three times (2003, 2004 and 2023). The team's leagues club and home ground, Pizzey Park, are located in the Gold Coast suburb of Miami. They currently serve as one of the feeder clubs for the Brisbane Broncos.

== History ==
Formed in 1934 by Bob Singh, originally based out of Rudd Park in Burleigh, the Bears relocated to Currumbin in 1959 after a nine-year cessation. In 1971, they relocated, this time to their current home, Pizzey Park, in Burleigh's neighbouring suburb of Miami.

Originally, the Bears competed in the Gold Coast Group 18 competition, before they were admitted to the state's top competition, the Queensland Cup, in 1997. Rick Stone, coached the Bears for 13 seasons, leading them to two premierships, in 1999 and 2004, before returning to the club in 2020 after his predecessor, Jim Lenihan, was promoted to assistant coach of the Gold Coast Titans.

The Bears had an affiliation with the Titans between 2007 and 2023. The Bears briefly became a feeder side to the Brisbane Broncos in 2008, before aligning back to the Titans in 2009. On 6 December 2019, it was revealed the Bears had extended their affiliation agreement with the Titans until the end of the 2022 season. For the 2024 season and beyond, the Bears will return to being a feeder team of the Broncos.

== Results ==
=== Queensland Cup ===
- 1997 – 4th
- 1998 – 8th
- 1999 – 3rd (Premiers)
- 2000 — 4th
- 2001 – 2nd
- 2002 – 4th
- 2003 – 1st (runners-up)
- 2004 – 1st (Premiers)
- 2005 – 3rd (runners-up)
- 2006 – 6th
- 2007 – 7th
- 2008 – 6th
- 2009 – 7th
- 2010 – 7th
- 2011 – 7th
- 2012 – 9th
- 2013 – 11th
- 2014 – 7th
- 2015 – 9th
- 2016 – 2nd (Premiers)
- 2017 – 10th
- 2018 – 2nd
- 2019 – 3rd (Premiers)

== Honours ==
=== Queensland Cup ===
- Premierships: 5

1999, 2004, 2016, 2019, 2025

- Runners Up: 2

2003, 2005

- Minor Premiership: 2

2003, 2004, 2022, 2023, 2025

== Records ==
Most games for club

- 201, Shane O'Flanagan
- 160, Ali Brown
- 146, Martin Griese
- 139, Ryan Gundry
- 135, Robert Apanui

Most points for club

- 964, Reggie Cressbrook
- 761, Nick Parfitt
- 660, Jamal Fogarty
- 486, Greg Bourke
- 462, Josh Rogers
- 276, Trent Purdon

Most tries for club

- 70, Kurtis Rowe
- 69, Reggie Cressbrook
- 69, Trent Purdon
- 66, Aseri Laing
- 61, Nick Shaw
- 59, Aaron Douglas

== See also ==
- National Rugby League reserves affiliations
- List of rugby league clubs in Australia
