= 2026 QRL Major Competitions =

The Queensland Rugby League will administer several Major Competitions during the 2026 season. This will include one men's competition, one women's competition, and five age based competitions. Along with the New South Wales Rugby League, these competitions feed into the National Rugby League.

== Open Age Competitions ==
=== Queensland Cup ===
2026 Queensland Cup
- Duration: 7 March – 26/27 September 2026
- Teams: 15
- Broadcast partners: Free to Air TV; Channel 9 (1 Match per week); Subscription TV; Fox League (1 Match per week); Streaming; QPlus TV (All Matches); 9Now (1 Match per week); Kayo Sports (1 Match per week)

The Queensland Cup (named the Hostplus Cup for sponsorship reasons) is the premier men's Rugby League competition in Queensland. Nationally, along with the New South Wales Cup, the Queensland Cup is a Tier 2 competition and feeds into the Tier 1 National Rugby League.

==== Teams ====
In 2026, the Queensland Cup retains the same 15-club line-up as the 2025 season, but there has been several notable changes to NRL affiliate arrangements. The most significant shift came from the Melbourne Storm, who ended their Queensland-based partnerships in order to field their own team in the NSW Cup for the 2026 season. As a result, the Brisbane Tigers entered a new affiliation with the Perth Bears, while the Sunshine Coast Falcons moved into the Brisbane Broncos pathway. Separately, the Townsville Blackhawks changed affiliation from the South Sydney Rabbitohs to the North Queensland Cowboys, further expanding the Cowboys' existing northern Queensland footprint. The Tweed Heads Seagulls' home venue was also rebranded from Piggabeen Sports Complex to Seagulls Sporting Complex. Central Queensland Capras moved back to Browne Park following renovations in 2025.

There were also a number of coaching changes between the 2025 and 2026 seasons. At the Brisbane Tigers, Jim Lenihan took over as head coach from Matt Church, while Sam Williams replaced Russell Aitken at the Northern Pride. Joe O'Callaghan succeeded David Penna at the Tweed Heads Seagulls, and Dave Elliott stepped in for Eric Smith as head coach of the Redcliffe Dolphins. The Western Clydesdales appointed brothers Shane and Ben Walker as joint head coaches, replacing Ned Murphy.

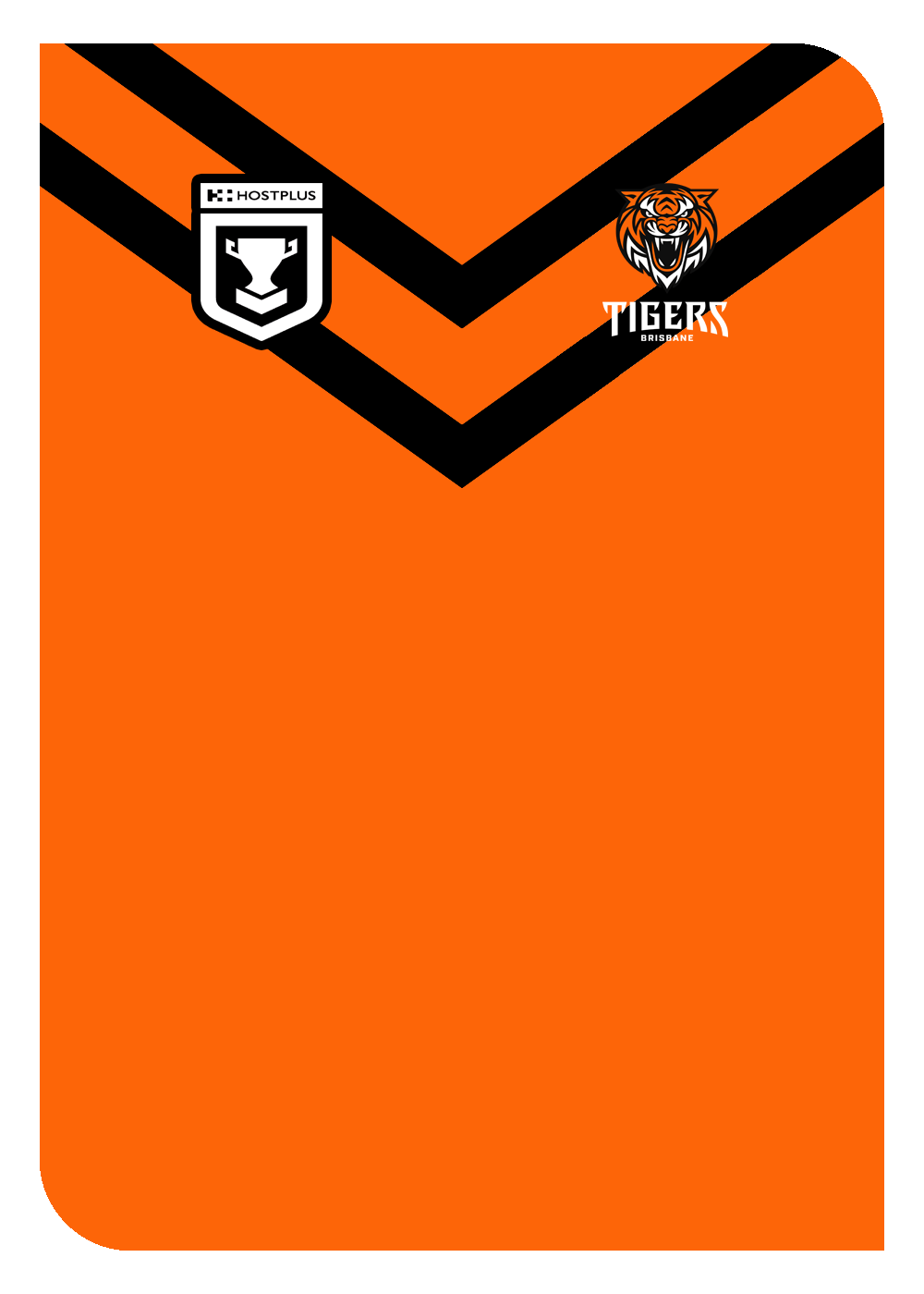
Brisbane; Tigers 31st season Ground: Totally Workwear Stadium City/Suburb: Brisbane (Stones Corner) Coach: Jim Lenihan Affiliate: Perth Bears

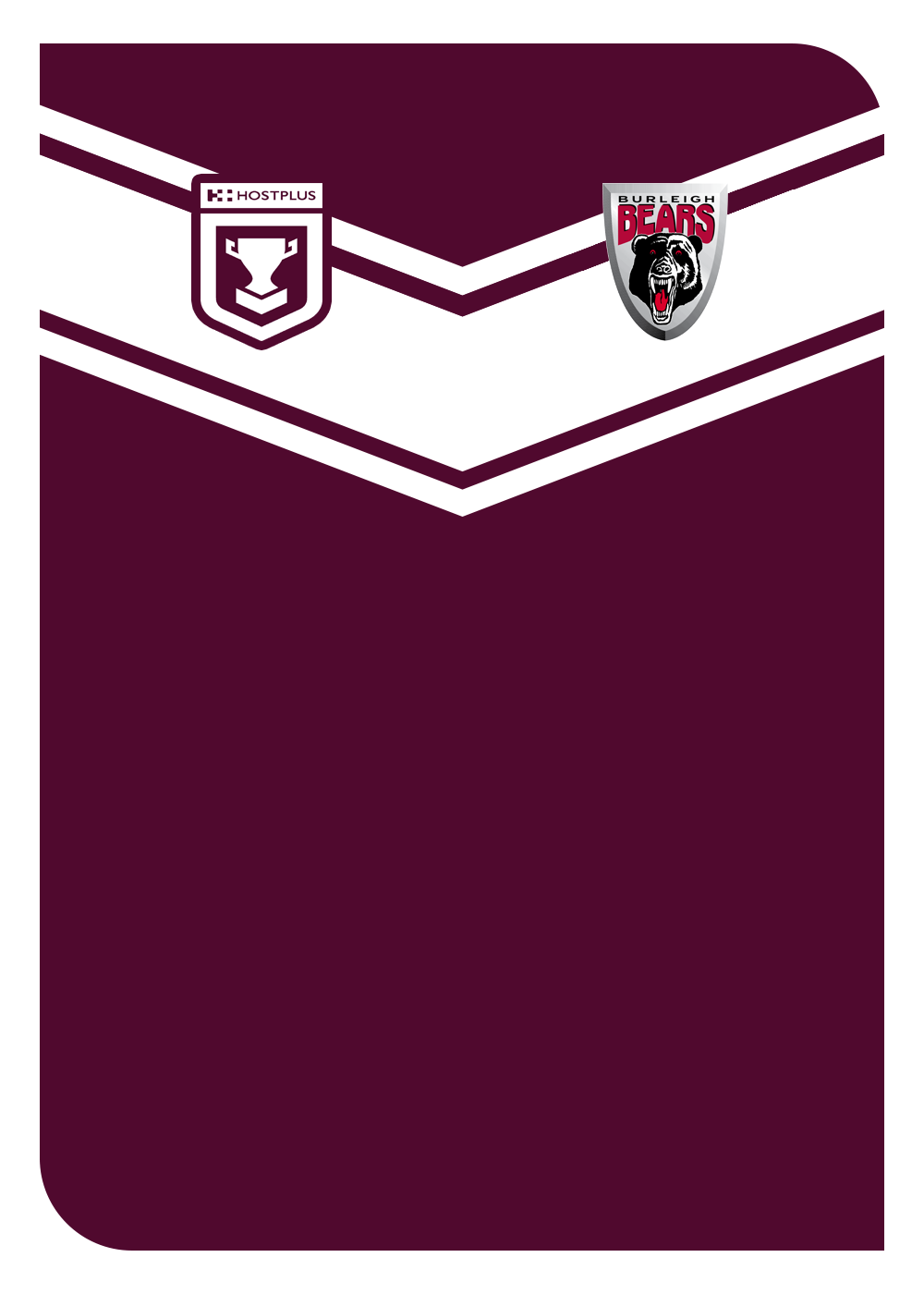
Burleigh; Bears 30th season Ground: UAA Park City/Suburb: Gold Coast (Miami) Coach: Luke Burt Affiliate: Brisbane Broncos

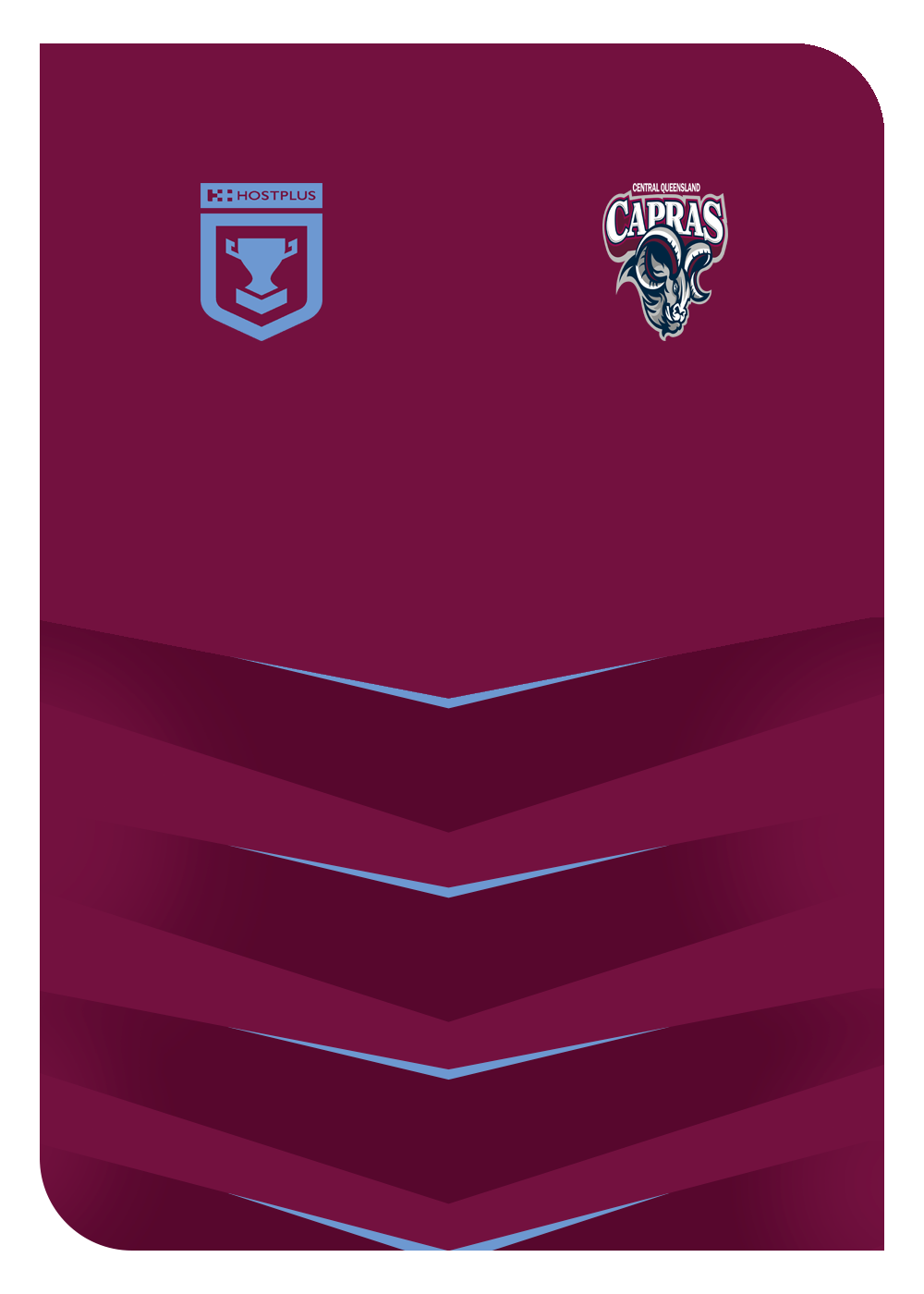
Central Queensland; Capras 31st season Ground: Browne Park City/Suburb: Rockhampton (Wandal) Coach: Lionel Harbin Affiliate: Dolphins

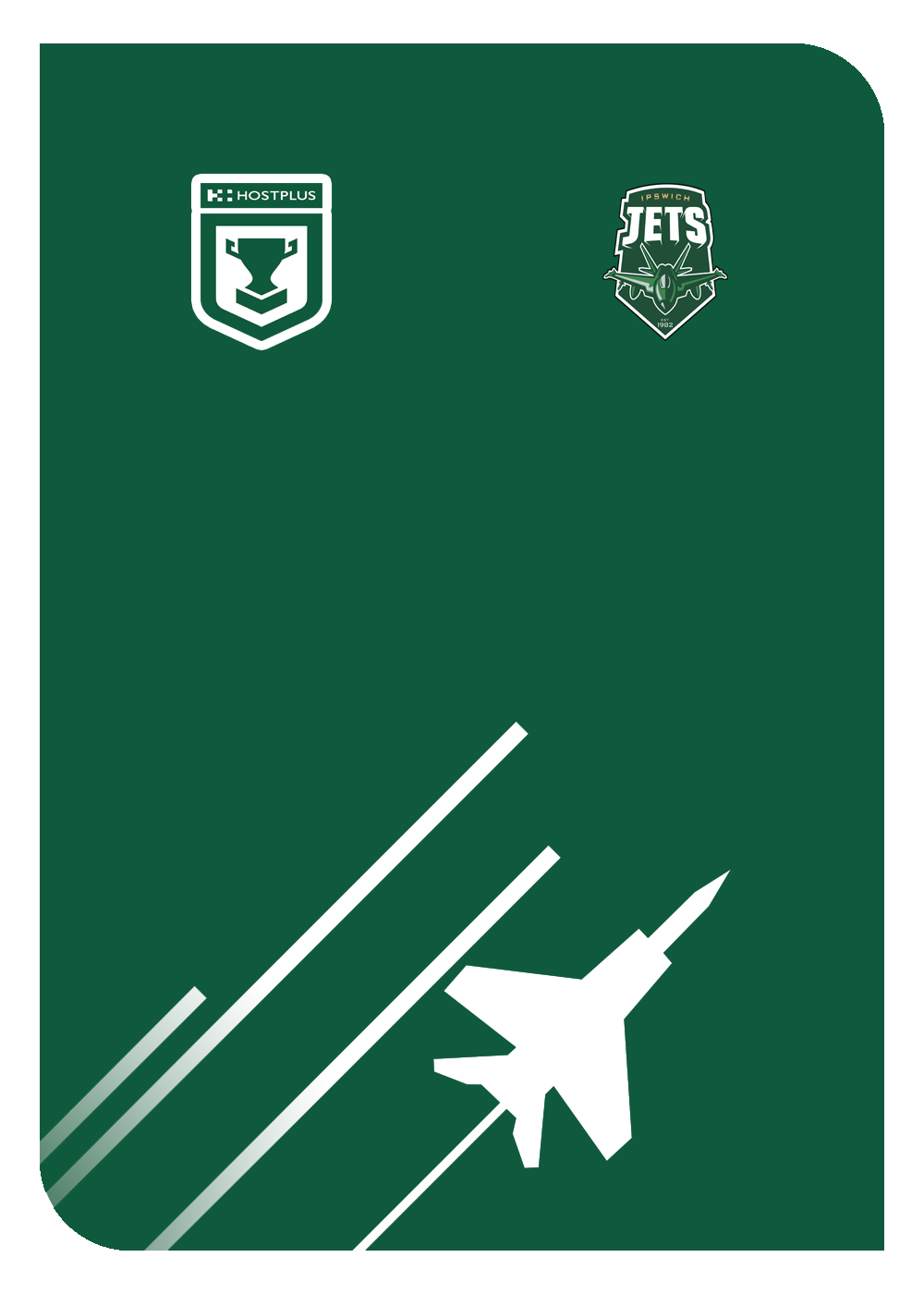
Ipswich; Jets 31st season Ground: Richardson Park City/Suburb: Brisbane (Ipswich) Coach: Tye Ingebrigtsen Affiliate: Gold Coast Titans

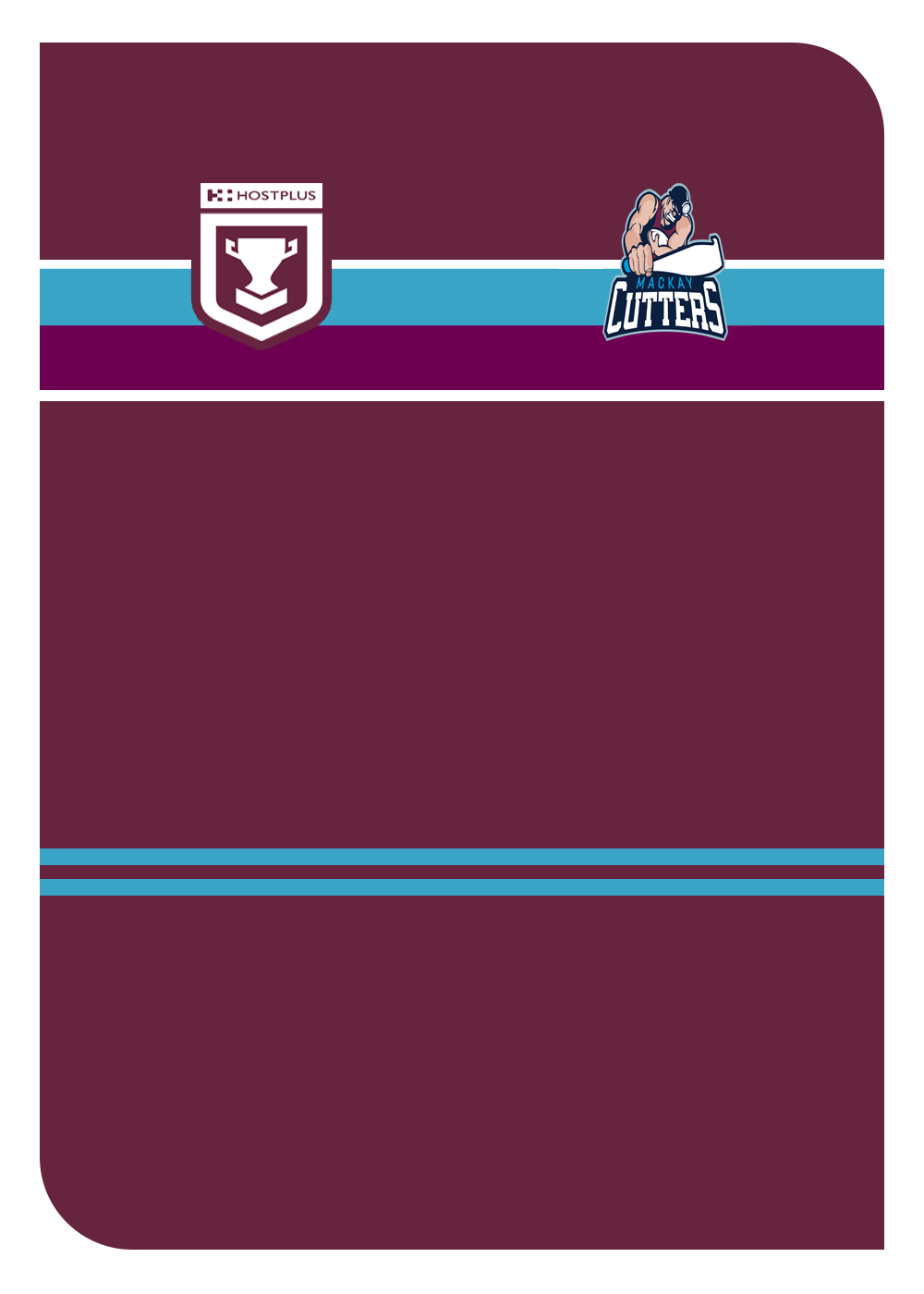
Mackay; Cutters 19th season Ground: BB Print Stadium City/Suburb: Mackay (South Mackay) Coach: Adam Cuthbertson Affiliate: North Queensland Cowboys

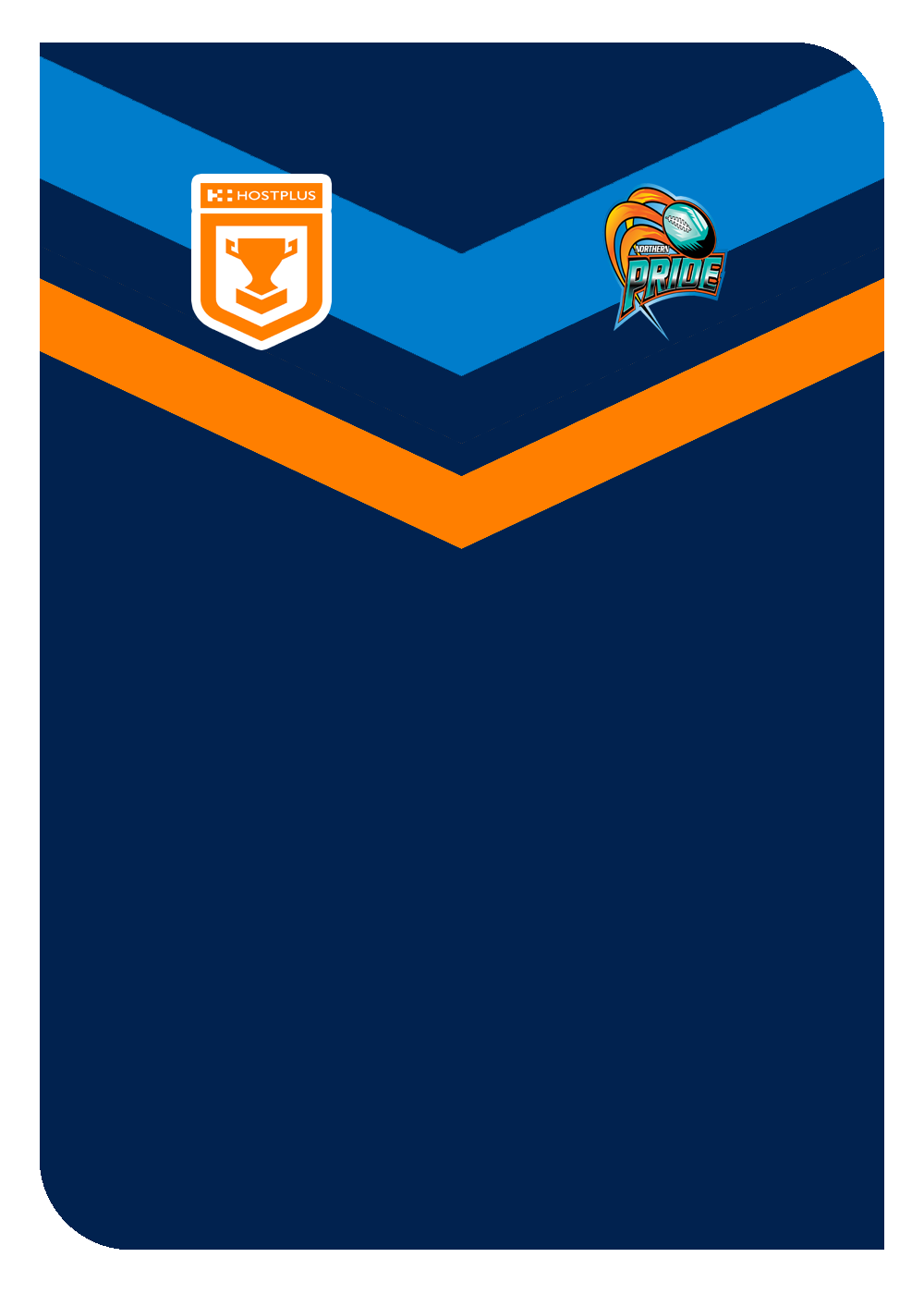
Northern; Pride 19th season Ground: Barlow Park City/Suburb: Cairns (Parramatta Park) Coach: Sam Williams Affiliate: North Queensland Cowboys

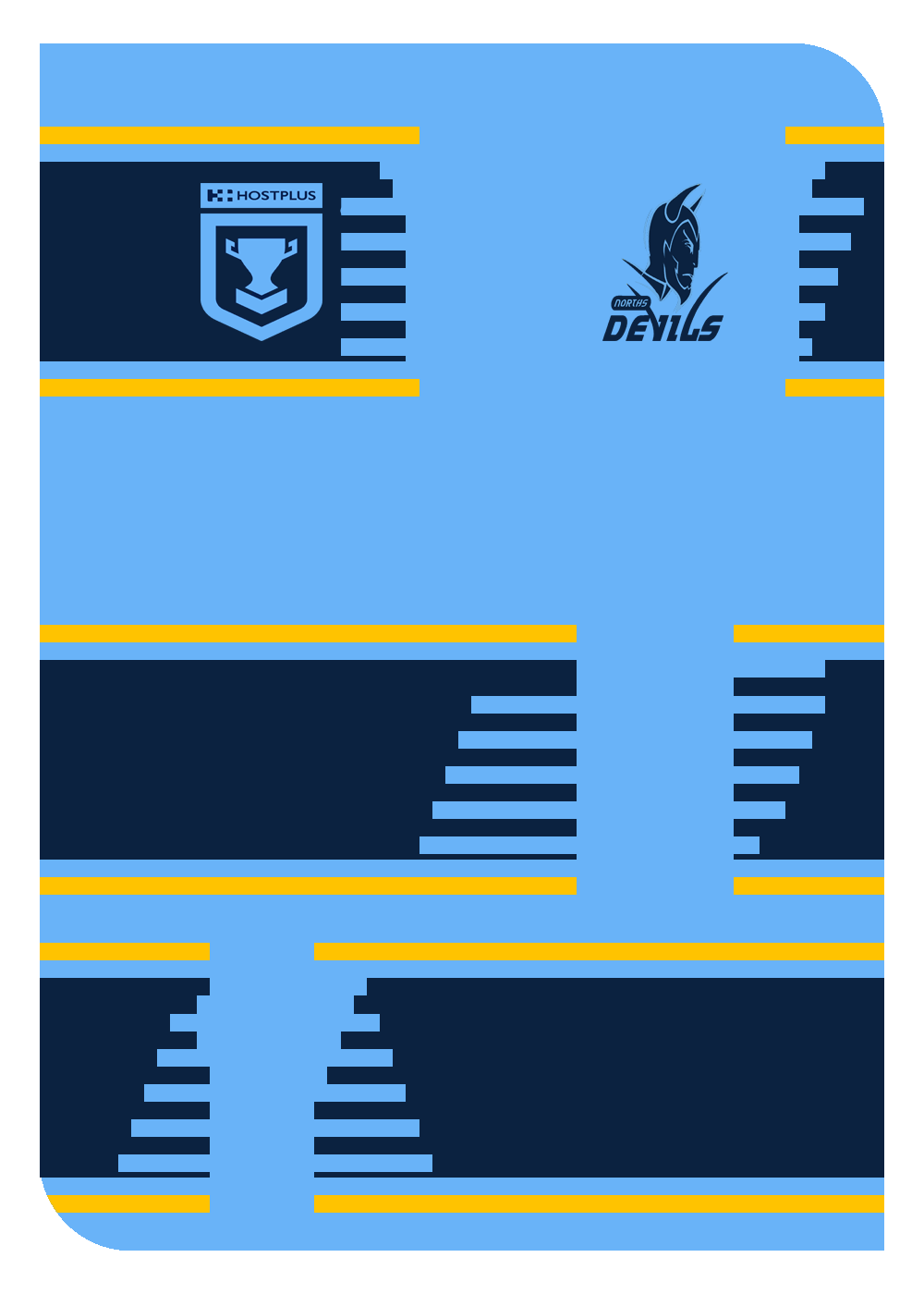
Norths; Devils 31st season Ground: Premiers' Park City/Suburb: Brisbane (Nundah) Coach: Rohan Smith Affiliate: Dolphins

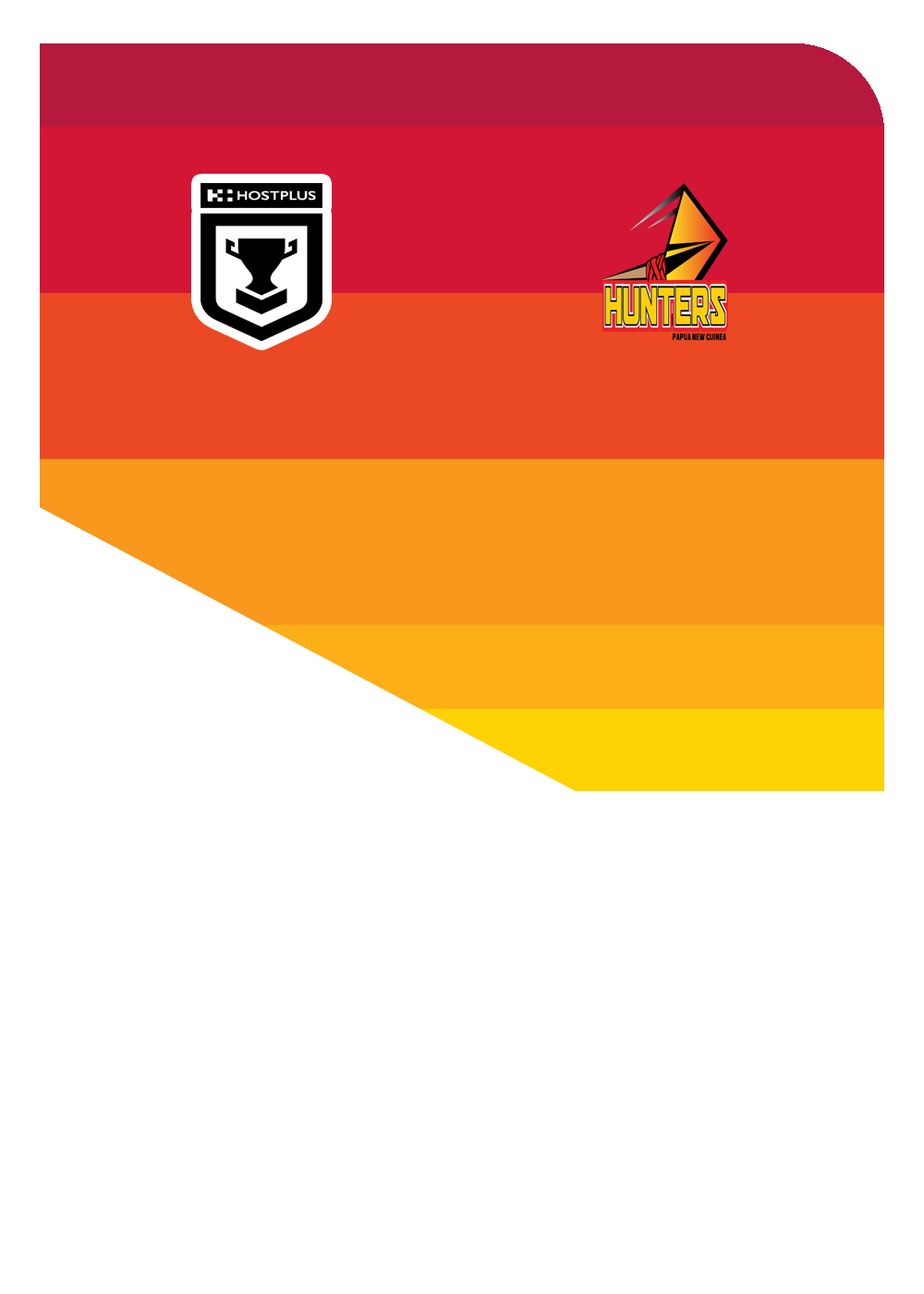
Papua New Guinea; Hunters 13th season Ground: Santos National Football Stadium City/Suburb: Port Moresby (Boroko) Coach: Paul Aiton Affiliate: Papua New Guinea Chiefs

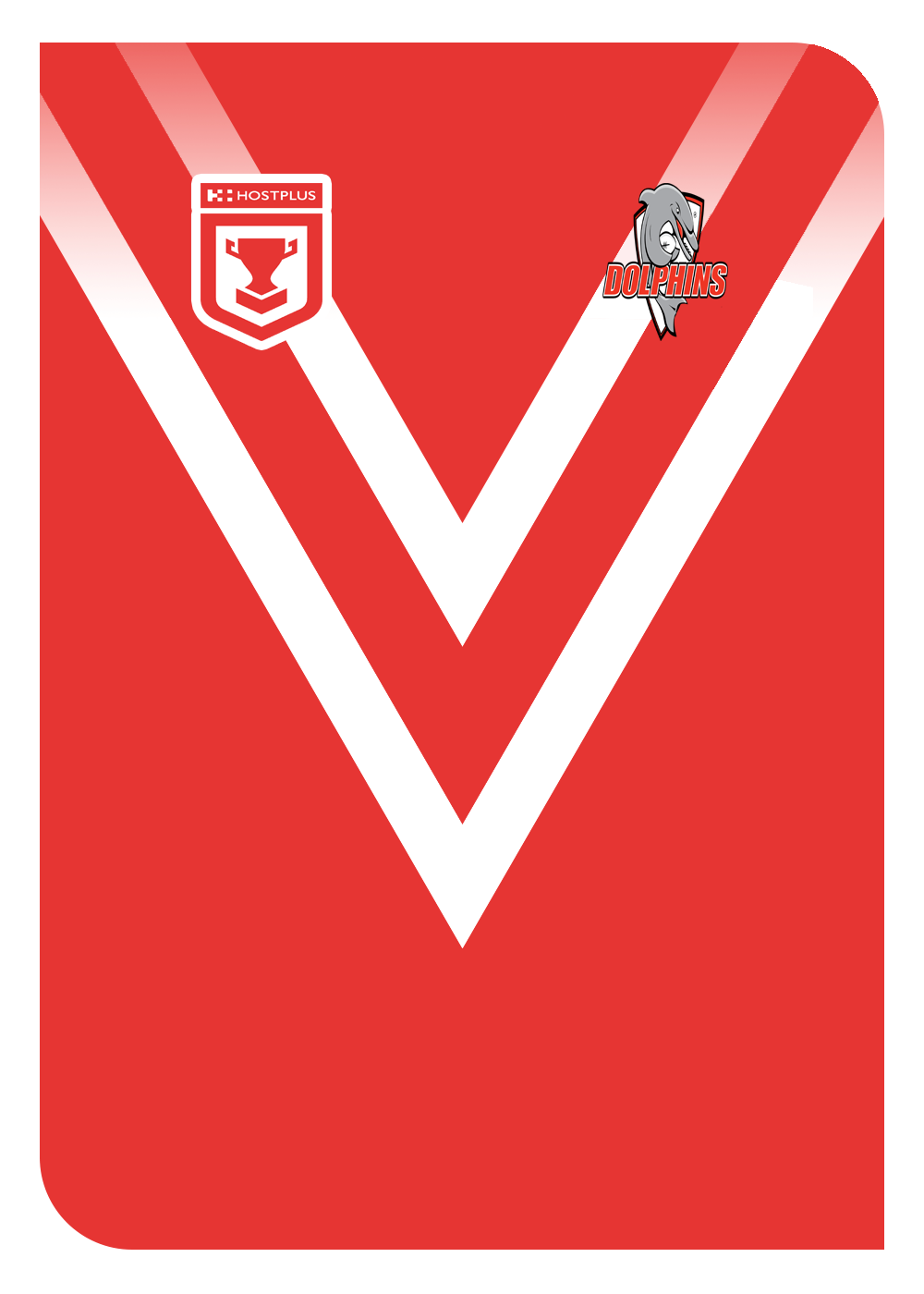
Redcliffe; Dolphins 31st season Ground: Kayo Stadium City/Suburb: Brisbane (Redcliffe) Coach: Dave Elliott Affiliate: Dolphins

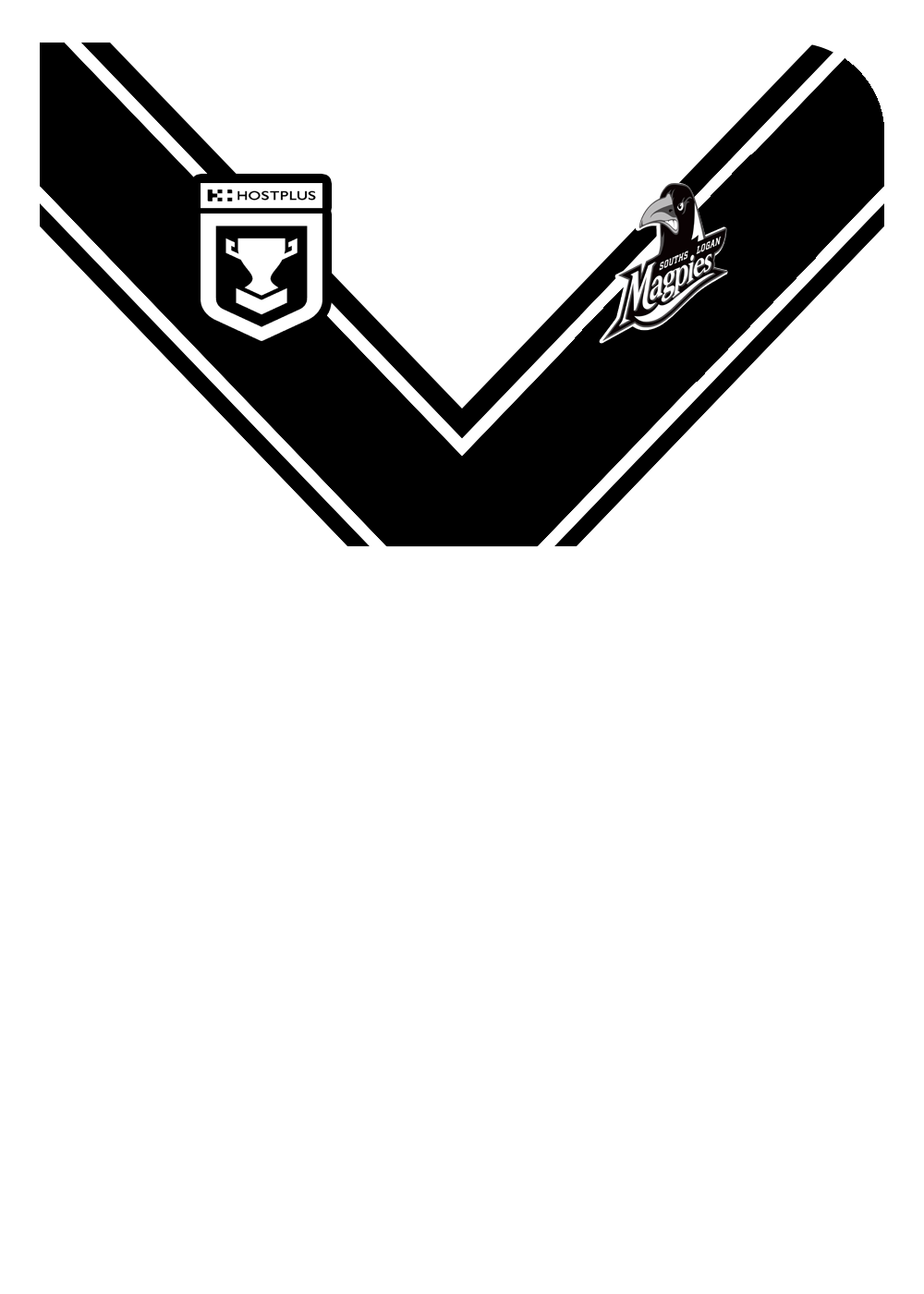
Souths Logan; Magpies 24th season Ground: Davies Park City/Suburb: Brisbane (West End) Coach: Karmichael Hunt Affiliate: Brisbane Broncos

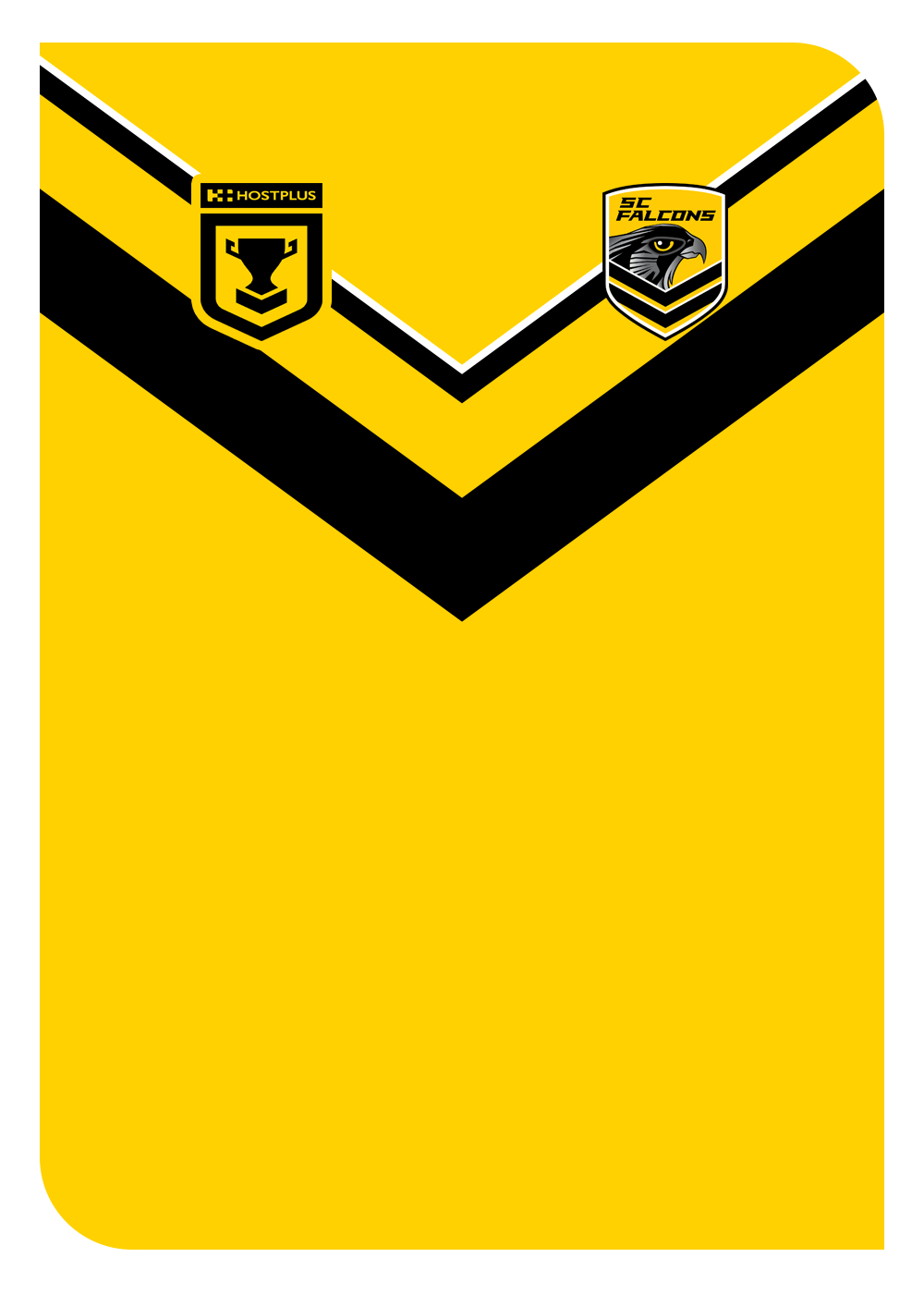
Sunshine Coast; Falcons 19th season Ground: Sunshine Coast Stadium City/Suburb: Sunshine Coast (Bokarina) Coach: Brad Henderson Affiliate: Brisbane Broncos

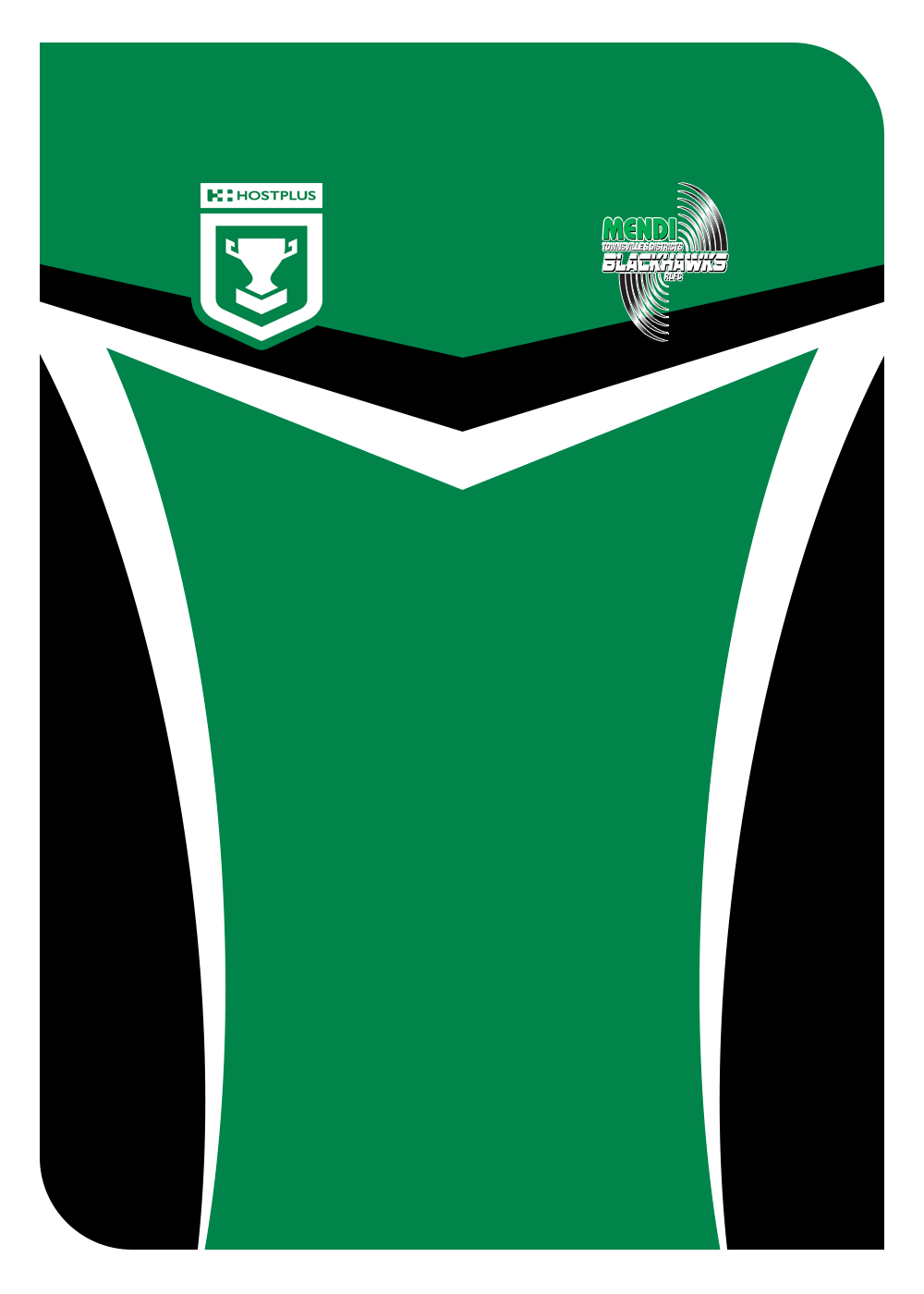
Townsville; Blackhawks 12th season Ground: Jack Manski Oval City/Suburb: Townsville (Kirwan) Coach: Terry Campese Affiliate: North Queensland Cowboys

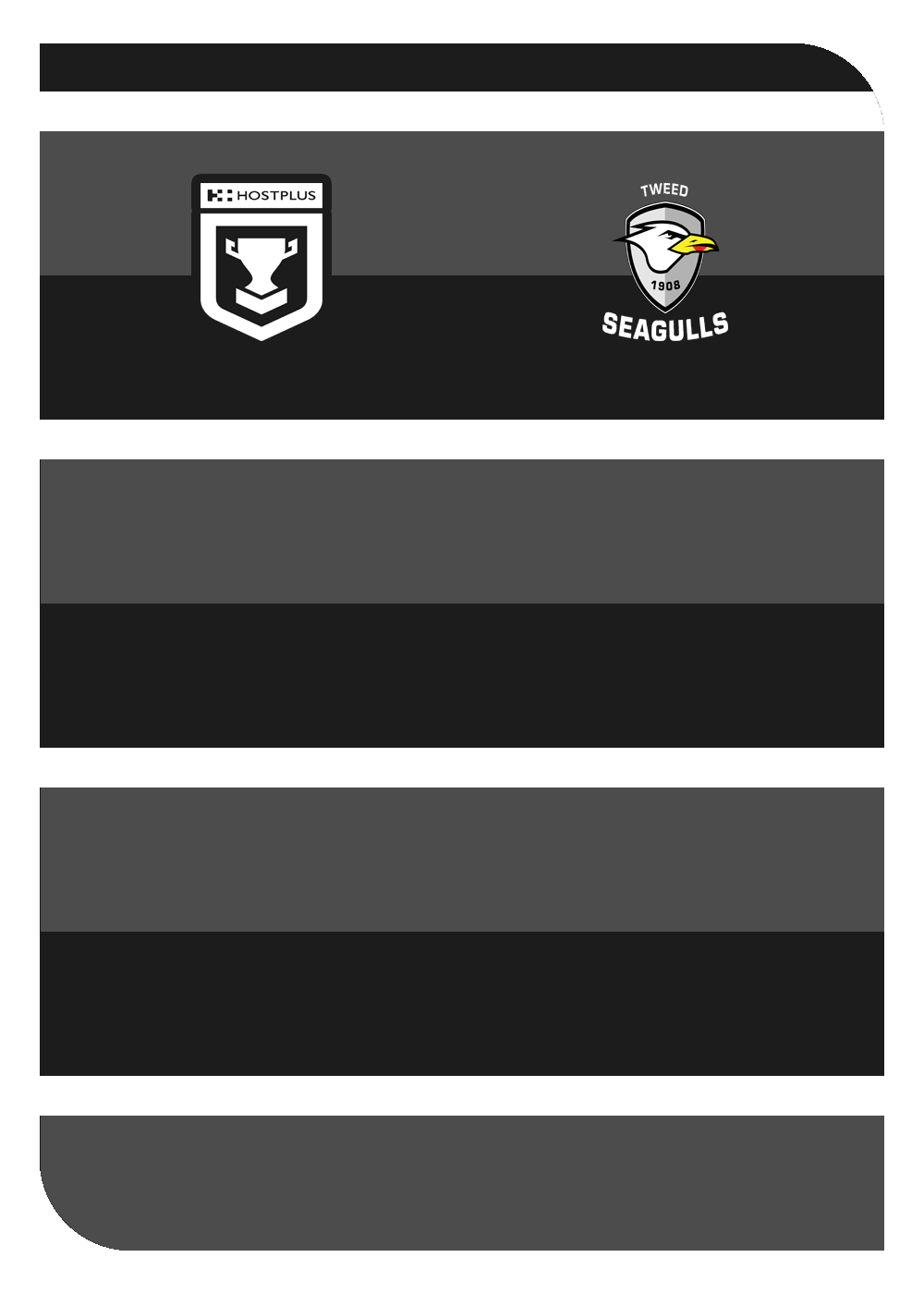
Tweed Heads; Seagulls 24th season Ground: Preston Building Sports Complex City/Suburb: Tweed Heads (Tweed Heads West) Coach: Joe O'Callaghan Affiliate: Gold Coast Titans

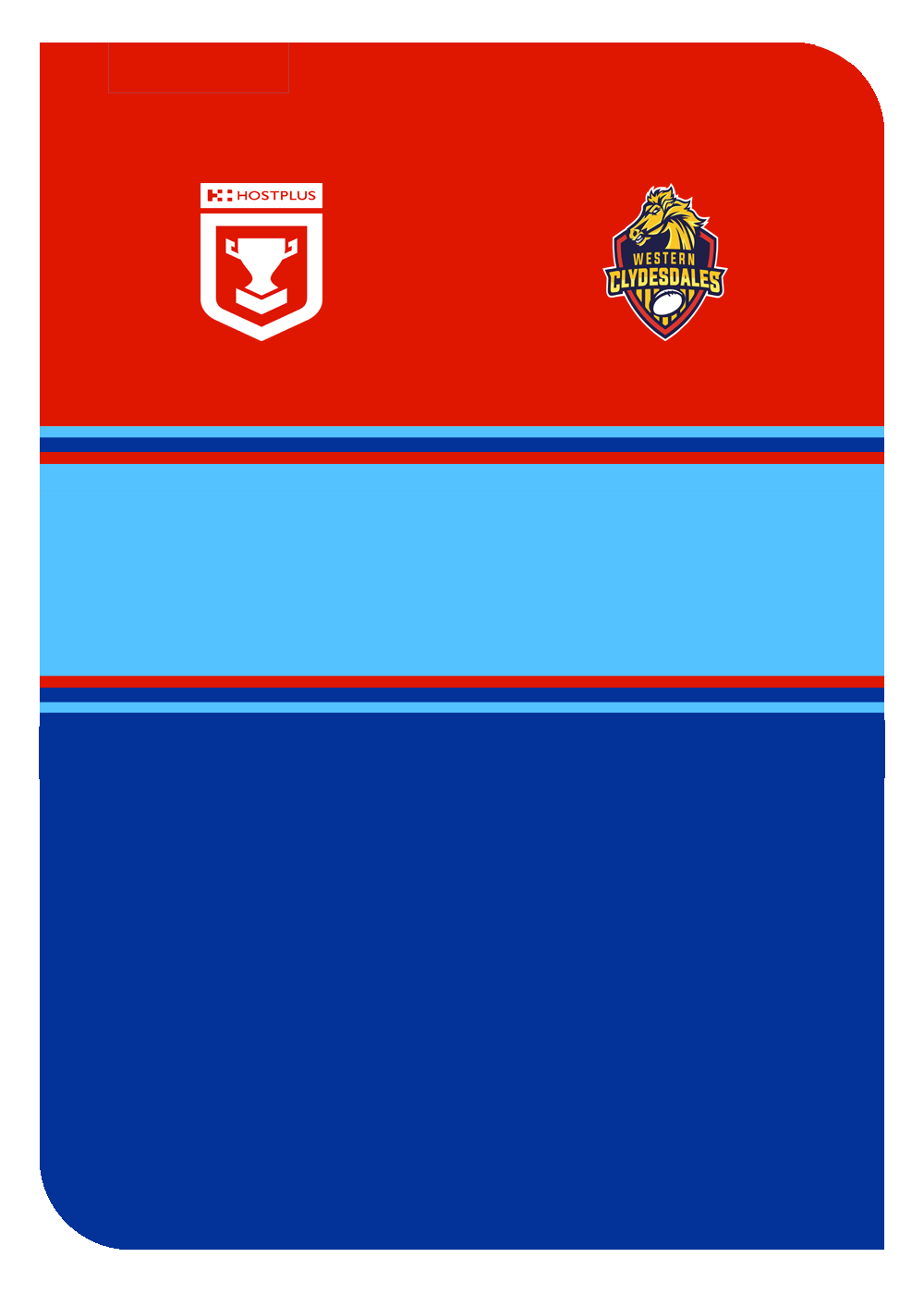
Western; Clydesdales 15th season Ground: Toowoomba Sports Ground City/Suburb: Toowoomba (East Toowoomba) Coach: Shane Walker & Ben Walker Affiliate: N/A

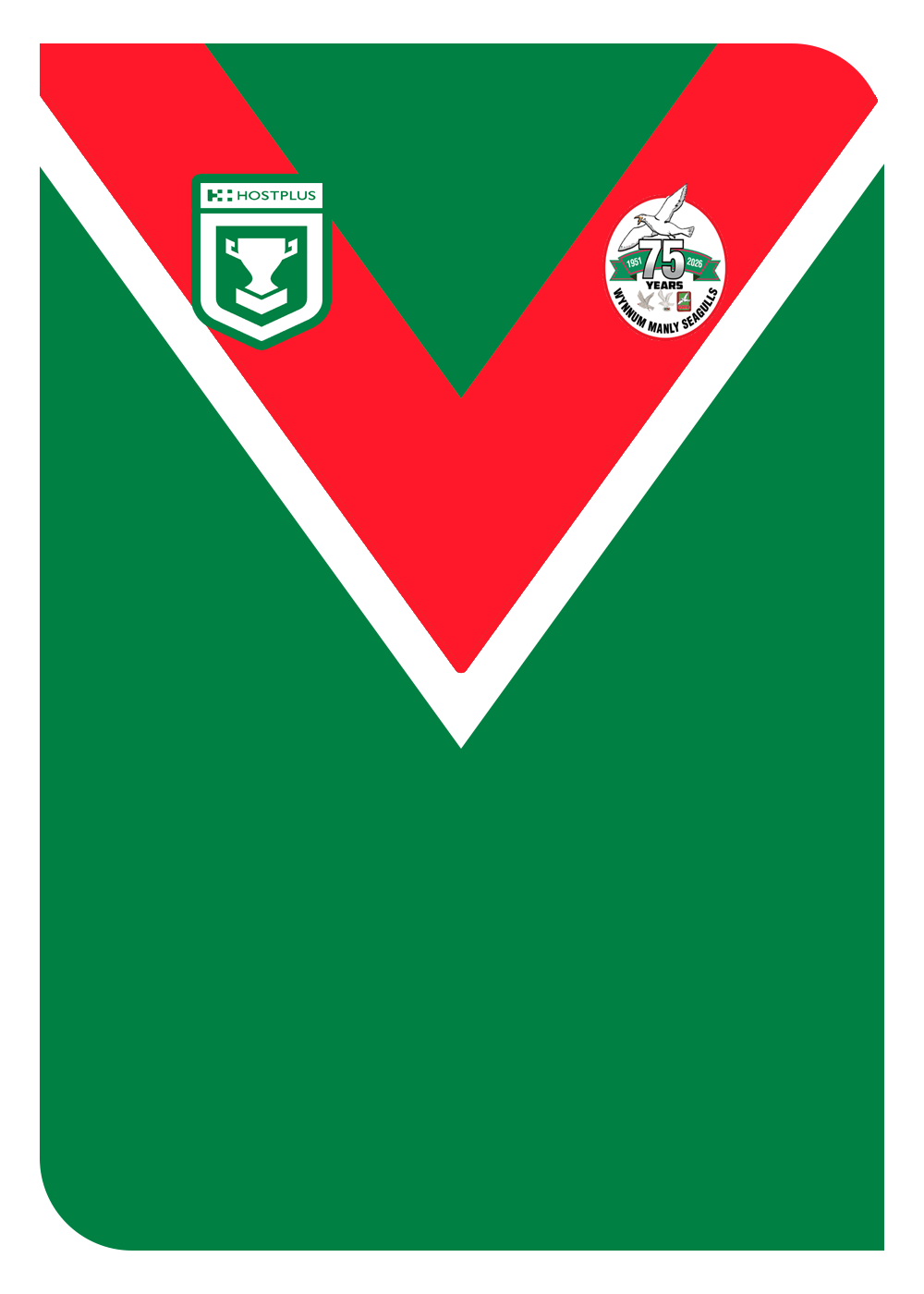
Wynnum Manly; Seagulls 31st season Ground: BMD Kougari Oval City/Suburb: Brisbane (Manly West) Coach: Mathew Head Affiliate: Brisbane Broncos

==== Ladder ====
Pos	Team	Pld	W	D	L	B	PF	PA	PD	Pts	Qualification
1	Sunshine Coast Falcons	20	16	0	4	3	557	370	+187	38	Finals series
2	Redcliffe Dolphins	20	14	1	5	3	577	344	+233	35	Finals series
3	Central Queensland Capras	20	13	1	6	3	499	430	+69	33	Finals series
4	Burleigh Bears	20	11	2	7	3	456	429	+27	30	Finals series
5	Townsville Blackhawks	20	11	1	8	3	536	372	+164	29	Finals series
6	Ipswich Jets	20	11	1	8	3	489	461	+28	29	Finals series
7	Mackay Cutters	20	10	2	8	3	500	468	+32	28	Finals series
8	Brisbane Tigers	20	11	0	9	3	444	476	−32	28	Finals series
9	Wynnum Manly Seagulls	20	10	1	9	3	570	442	+128	27	
10	Northern Pride	20	7	5	8	3	496	450	+46	25	
11	Souths Logan Magpies	20	8	3	9	3	483	538	−55	25	
12	Tweed Heads Seagulls	20	5	2	13	3	471	604	−133	18	
13	Norths Devils	20	5	1	14	3	402	512	−110	17	
14	Western Clydesdales	20	5	0	15	3	409	642	−233	16	
15	Papua New Guinea Hunters	20	3	0	17	3	312	663	−351	12	

Source: QRL RLP

===== Ladder progression =====
- Numbers highlighted in green indicate that the team finished the round inside the top 8.
- Numbers highlighted in blue indicates the team finished first on the ladder in that round.
- Numbers highlighted in red indicates the team finished last place on the ladder in that round.
- Underlined numbers indicate that the team had a bye during that round.

Pos	Team	1	2	3	4	5	6	7	8	9	10	11	12	13	14	15	16	17	18	19	20	21	22	23
1	Mackay Cutters	2	4	6	7																			
2	Ipswich Jets	2	2	4	6																			
3	Redcliffe Dolphins	0	2	4	6																			
4	Burleigh Bears	2	3	4	6																			
5	Northern Pride	2	4	6	6																			
6	Sunshine Coast Falcons	0	2	4	6																			
7	Brisbane Tigers	2	4	4	6																			
8	Souths Logan Magpies	2	3	4	4																			
9	Central Queensland Capras	2	2	2	4																			
10	Norths Devils	0	2	3	3																			
11	Wynnum Manly Seagulls	0	2	2	3																			
12	Tweed Heads Seagulls	2	2	3	3																			
13	Papua New Guinea Hunters	0	0	2	2																			
14	Townsville Blackhawks	0	0	0	2																			
15	Western Clydesdales	0	0	0	0																			

Season Results:

Home	Score	Away	Match Information
Home	Score	Away	Date and Time	Venue	Referee	Video
Round 1
Wynnum Manly Seagulls	16 – 24	Souths Logan Magpies	Saturday, 7 March, 3:00pm	BMD Kougari Oval	Jordan Morel
Tweed Heads Seagulls	34 – 28	Sunshine Coast Falcons	Saturday, 7 March, 5:00pm	Preston Building Sports Complex	Nick Pelgrave
Norths Devils	18 – 32	Mackay Cutters	Saturday, 7 March, 6:00pm	Premiers' Park	Josh Eaton
Redcliffe Dolphins	12 – 22	Burleigh Bears	Sunday, 8 March, 1:10pm	Kayo Stadium	Jarrod Cole
Western Clydesdales	12 – 22	Brisbane Tigers	Sunday, 8 March, 2:30pm	Toowoomba Sports Ground	Matt Gannon
Ipswich Jets	30 – 0	Townsville Blackhawks	Sunday, 8 March, 3:10pm	Richardson Park	Tyson Brough
Papua New Guinea Hunters	16 – 24	Central Queensland Capras	Sunday, 8 March, 3:30pm	Santos National Football Stadium	Daniel Schwass
Northern Pride		BYE
Round 2
Ipswich Jets	12 – 24	Sunshine Coast Falcons	Saturday, 14 March, 2:30pm	Stafford Park	Jordan Morel
Brisbane Tigers	36 – 22	Central Queensland Capras	Saturday, 14 March, 3:00pm	Totally Workwear Stadium	Josh Eaton
Redcliffe Dolphins	28 – 14	Townsville Blackhawks	Saturday, 14 March, 3:00pm	Kayo Stadium	Matt Gannon
Northern Pride	30 – 24	Tweed Heads Seagulls	Saturday, 14 March, 5:30pm	Barlow Park	Taylor Worth
Western Clydesdales	10 – 42	Norths Devils	Sunday, 15 March, 2:10pm	Toowoomba Sports Ground	Daniel Schwass
Papua New Guinea Hunters	20 – 28	Wynnum Manly Seagulls	Sunday, 15 March, 3:30pm	Santos National Football Stadium	Cody Kwik
Souths Logan Magpies	28 – 28	Burleigh Bears	Sunday, 15 March, 3:30pm	Davies Park	Nick Pelgrave
Mackay Cutters		BYE
Round 3 (XXXX Rivalry Round)
Tweed Heads Seagulls	28 – 28	Burleigh Bears	Saturday, 21 March, 5:00pm	Preston Building Sports Complex	Daniel Schwass
Mackay Cutters	24 – 10	Central Queensland Capras	Saturday, 21 March, 6:00pm	BB Print Stadium	Taylor Worth
Townsville Blackhawks	8 – 20	Northern Pride	Saturday, 21 March, 7:00pm	Jack Manski Oval	Matt Gannon
Norths Devils	24 – 24	Souths Logan Magpies	Sunday, 22 March, 2:30pm	Premiers' Park	Jarrod Cole
Wynnum Manly Seagulls	16 – 36	Redcliffe Dolphins	Sunday, 22 March, 3:10pm	BMD Kougari Oval	Belinda Sharpe
Ipswich Jets	48 – 6	Brisbane Tigers	Sunday, 22 March, 3:10pm	Richardson Park	Josh Eaton
Western Clydesdales	14 – 38	Papua New Guinea Hunters	Sunday, 22 March, 4:00pm	Toowoomba Sports Ground	Jordan Morel
Sunshine Coast Falcons		BYE
Round 4
Brisbane Tigers	22 – 12	Norths Devils	Saturday, 28 March, 3:00pm	Totally Workwear Stadium	Ziggy Pzeklasa-Adamski
Sunshine Coast Falcons	20 – 18	Western Clydesdales	Saturday, 28 March, 5:00pm	Sunshine Coast Stadium	Ben Watts
Burleigh Bears	26 – 18	Northern Pride	Saturday, 28 March, 5:00pm	UAA Park	Taylor Worth
Redcliffe Dolphins	33 – 4	Papua New Guinea Hunters	Saturday, 28 March, 6:00pm	Kayo Stadium	Matt Gannon
Souths Logan Magpies	30 – 32	Ipswich Jets	Sunday, 29 March, 2:00pm	Davies Park	Jarrod Cole
Townsville Blackhawks	34 – 6	Tweed Heads Seagulls	Sunday, 29 March, 2:10pm	Jack Manski Oval	Damian Brady
Wynnum Manly Seagulls	26 – 26	Mackay Cutters	Sunday, 29 March, 3:00pm	BMD Kougari Oval	Tyson Brough
Central Queensland Capras		BYE
Round 5
Brisbane Tigers	V	Papua New Guinea Hunters	Saturday, 11 April, 3:00pm	Totally Workwear Stadium	TBA
Northern Pride	V	Mackay Cutters	Saturday, 11 April, 3:00pm	Barlow Park	TBA
Tweed Heads Seagulls	V	Souths Logan Magpies	Saturday, 11 April, 3:00pm	Preston Building Sports Complex	TBA
Ipswich Jets	V	Burleigh Bears	Saturday, 11 April, 3:10pm	Richardson Park	TBA
Townsville Blackhawks	V	Wynnum Manly Seagulls	Saturday, 11 April, 5:00pm	Jack Manski Oval	TBA
Norths Devils	V	Central Queensland Capras	Saturday, 11 April, 5:00pm	Premiers' Park	TBA
Sunshine Coast Falcons	V	Redcliffe Dolphins	Saturday, 11 April, 5:00pm	Sunshine Coast Stadium	TBA
Western Clydesdales		BYE
Round 6
Burleigh Bears	V	Norths Devils	Saturday, 18 April, 3:00pm	UAA Park	TBA
Brisbane Tigers	V	Wynnum Manly Seagulls	Saturday, 18 April, 3:00pm	Totally Workwear Stadium	TBA
Northern Pride	V	Sunshine Coast Falcons	Saturday, 18 April, 3:00pm	Barlow Park	TBA
Papua New Guinea Hunters	V	Ipswich Jets	Saturday, 18 April, 3:00pm	Santos National Football Stadium	TBA
Townsville Blackhawks	V	Central Queensland Capras	Saturday, 18 April, 5:00pm	Jack Manski Oval	TBA
Mackay Cutters	V	Tweed Heads Seagulls	Saturday, 18 April, 6:00pm	BB Print Stadium	TBA
Western Clydesdales	V	Souths Logan Magpies	Sunday, 19 April, TBA	TBA	TBA
Redcliffe Dolphins		BYE
Round 7 (ANZAC Round)
Burleigh Bears	V	Papua New Guinea Hunters	Saturday, 25 April, 3:00pm	UAA Park	TBA
Wynnum Manly Seagulls	V	Western Clydesdales	Saturday, 25 April, 3:00pm	BMD Kougari Oval	TBA
Tweed Heads Seagulls	V	Central Queensland Capras	Saturday, 25 April, 3:00pm	Preston Building Sports Complex	TBA
Norths Devils	V	Redcliffe Dolphins	Saturday, 25 April, 4:00pm	Premiers' Park	TBA
Townsville Blackhawks	V	Brisbane Tigers	Saturday, 25 April, 5:00pm	Jack Manski Oval	TBA
Mackay Cutters	V	Ipswich Jets	Saturday, 25 April, 6:00pm	BB Print Stadium	TBA
Souths Logan Magpies	V	Sunshine Coast Falcons	Sunday, 26 April, 2:10pm	Davies Park	TBA
Northern Pride		BYE
Round 8
Papua New Guinea Hunters	V	Sunshine Coast Falcons	Saturday, 2 May, 3:30pm	Santos National Football Stadium	TBA
Redcliffe Dolphins	V	Northern Pride	Saturday, 2 May, 4:00pm	Kayo Stadium	TBA
Central Queensland Capras	V	Burleigh Bears	Saturday, 2 May, 6:00pm	Browne Park	TBA
Souths Logan Magpies	V	Mackay Cutters	Sunday, 3 May, 3:00pm	Davies Park	TBA
Western Clydesdales	V	Townsville Blackhawks	Sunday, 3 May, TBA	TBA	TBA
Brisbane Tigers	BYE	Ipswich Jets
Norths Devils	BYE	Tweed Heads Seagulls
Wynnum Manly Seagulls	BYE
Round 9
Townsville Blackhawks	V	Redcliffe Dolphins	Saturday, 9 May, 5:00pm	Jack Manski Oval	TBA
Sunshine Coast Falcons	V	Brisbane Tigers	Saturday, 9 May, 5:00pm	Sunshine Coast Stadium	TBA
Mackay Cutters	V	Papua New Guinea Hunters	Saturday, 9 May, 6:00pm	BB Print Stadium	TBA
Central Queensland Capras	V	Ipswich Jets	Saturday, 9 May, 6:00pm	Browne Park	TBA
Tweed Heads Seagulls	V	Western Clydesdales	Sunday, 10 May, 2:00pm	Preston Building Sports Complex	TBA
Wynnum Manly Seagulls	V	Norths Devils	Sunday, 10 May, 3:00pm	BMD Kougari Oval	TBA
Souths Logan Magpies	V	Northern Pride	Sunday, 10 May, 3:00pm	Davies Park	TBA
Burleigh Bears		BYE
Round 10
Northern Pride	V	Western Clydesdales	Saturday, 16 May, 3:00pm	Barlow Park	TBA
Mackay Cutters	V	Burleigh Bears	Saturday, 16 May, 6:00pm	BB Print Stadium	TBA
Papua New Guinea Hunters	V	Souths Logan Magpies	Sunday, 17 May, 3:30pm	Santos National Football Stadium	TBA
Central Queensland Capras	V	Redcliffe Dolphins	Saturday, 23 May, 4:00pm	Browne Park	TBA
Sunshine Coast Falcons	V	Wynnum Manly Seagulls	Saturday, 23 May, 5:00pm	Sunshine Coast Stadium	TBA
Ipswich Jets	V	Tweed Heads Seagulls	Sunday, 24 May, 2:10pm	Richardson Park	TBA
Norths Devils	V	Brisbane Tigers	Sunday, 24 May, 2:10pm	Premiers' Park	TBA
Townsville Blackhawks		BYE
Round 11
Burleigh Bears	V	Souths Logan Magpies	Saturday, 30 May, 3:00pm	UAA Park	TBA
Brisbane Tigers	V	Redcliffe Dolphins	Saturday, 30 May, 3:00pm	Totally Workwear Stadium	TBA
Tweed Heads Seagulls	V	Northern Pride	Saturday, 30 May, 3:00pm	Preston Building Sports Complex	TBA
Wynnum Manly Seagulls	V	Central Queensland Capras	Saturday, 30 May, 3:00pm	BMD Kougari Oval	TBA
Townsville Blackhawks	V	Mackay Cutters	Saturday, 30 May, 5:00pm	Jack Manski Oval	TBA
Norths Devils	V	Sunshine Coast Falcons	Saturday, 30 May, 5:00pm	Premiers' Park	TBA
Ipswich Jets	V	Western Clydesdales	Sunday, 31 May, 2:10pm	TBA	TBA
Papua New Guinea Hunters		BYE
Round 12
Western Clydesdales	V	Redcliffe Dolphins	Saturday, 6 June, 2:00pm	Toowoomba Sports Ground	TBA
Tweed Heads Seagulls	V	Papua New Guinea Hunters	Saturday, 6 June, 2:00pm	Preston Building Sports Complex	TBA
Burleigh Bears	V	Sunshine Coast Falcons	Saturday, 6 June, 3:00pm	UAA Park	TBA
Brisbane Tigers	V	Townsville Blackhawks	Saturday, 6 June, 3:00pm	Totally Workwear Stadium	TBA
Northern Pride	V	Wynnum Manly Seagulls	Saturday, 6 June, 3:00pm	Barlow Park	TBA
Central Queensland Capras	BYE	Mackay Cutters
Norths Devils	BYE	Ipswich Jets
Souths Logan Magpies	BYE
Round 13
Central Queensland Capras	V	Western Clydesdales	Saturday, 13 June, 4:00pm	Browne Park	TBA
Townsville Blackhawks	V	Ipswich Jets	Saturday, 13 June, 5:00pm	Jack Manski Oval	TBA
Norths Devils	V	Tweed Heads Seagulls	Saturday, 13 June, 5:00pm	Premiers' Park	TBA
Mackay Cutters	V	Souths Logan Magpies	Saturday, 13 June, 6:00pm	BB Print Stadium	TBA
Papua New Guinea Hunters	V	Burleigh Bears	Sunday, 14 June, 3:30pm	Santos National Football Stadium	TBA
Redcliffe Dolphins	BYE	Sunshine Coast Falcons
Northern Pride	BYE	Brisbane Tigers
Wynnum Manly Seagulls	BYE
Round 14
Central Queensland Capras	V	Souths Logan Magpies	Saturday, 20 June, 4:00pm	Browne Park	TBA
Sunshine Coast Falcons	V	Townsville Blackhawks	Saturday, 20 June, 5:00pm	Sunshine Coast Stadium	TBA
Mackay Cutters	V	Brisbane Tigers	Saturday, 20 June, 6:00pm	BB Print Stadium	TBA
Redcliffe Dolphins	V	Ipswich Jets	Sunday, 21 June, 2:00pm	Kayo Stadium	TBA
Norths Devils	V	Wynnum Manly Seagulls	Sunday, 21 June, 2:30pm	Premiers' Park	TBA
Papua New Guinea Hunters	V	Northern Pride	Sunday, 21 June, 3:30pm	Santos National Football Stadium	TBA
Burleigh Bears	BYE	Western Clydesdales
Tweed Heads Seagulls	BYE
Round 15
Burleigh Bears	V	Tweed Heads Seagulls	Saturday, 27 June, 3:00pm	UAA Park	TBA
Northern Pride	V	Townsville Blackhawks	Saturday, 27 June, 3:00pm	Barlow Park	TBA
Brisbane Tigers	V	Ipswich Jets	Saturday, 27 June, 3:00pm	Totally Workwear Stadium	TBA
Central Queensland Capras	V	Mackay Cutters	Saturday, 27 June, 4:00pm	Browne Park	TBA
Redcliffe Dolphins	V	Wynnum Manly Seagulls	Sunday, 28 June, 2:00pm	Kayo Stadium	TBA
Western Clydesdales	V	Sunshine Coast Falcons	Sunday, 28 June, 2:00pm	Toowoomba Sports Ground	TBA
Souths Logan Magpies	V	Norths Devils	Sunday, 28 June, 3:00pm	Davies Park	TBA
Papua New Guinea Hunters		BYE
Round 16
Northern Pride	V	Ipswich Jets	Saturday, 4 July, 3:00pm	Barlow Park	TBA
Tweed Heads Seagulls	V	Brisbane Tigers	Saturday, 4 July, 4:00pm	Preston Building Sports Complex	TBA
Sunshine Coast Falcons	V	Central Queensland Capras	Saturday, 4 July, 5:00pm	Sunshine Coast Stadium	TBA
Mackay Cutters	V	Norths Devils	Saturday, 4 July, 6:00pm	BB Print Stadium	TBA
Western Clydesdales	V	Burleigh Bears	Sunday, 5 July, 2:00pm	Toowoomba Sports Ground	TBA
Wynnum Manly Seagulls	V	Papua New Guinea Hunters	Sunday, 5 July, 3:00pm	BMD Kougari Oval	TBA
Souths Logan Magpies	V	Redcliffe Dolphins	Sunday, 5 July, 3:00pm	Davies Park	TBA
Townsville Blackhawks		BYE
Round 17
Tweed Heads Seagulls	V	Townsville Blackhawks	Saturday, 11 July, 2:00pm	Preston Building Sports Complex	TBA
Burleigh Bears	V	Mackay Cutters	Saturday, 11 July, 3:00pm	UAA Park	TBA
Western Clydesdales	V	Northern Pride	Sunday, 12 July, 2:00pm	Toowoomba Sports Ground	TBA
Ipswich Jets	V	Central Queensland Capras	Sunday, 12 July, 2:10pm	Richardson Park	TBA
Brisbane Tigers	V	Souths Logan Magpies	Sunday, 12 July, 3:00pm	Totally Workwear Stadium	TBA
Papua New Guinea Hunters	V	Norths Devils	Sunday, 12 July, 3:30pm	Santos National Football Stadium	TBA
Redcliffe Dolphins	BYE	Sunshine Coast Falcons
Wynnum Manly Seagulls	BYE
Round 18
Redcliffe Dolphins	V	Sunshine Coast Falcons	Saturday, 18 July, 4:00pm	Kayo Stadium	TBA
Central Queensland Capras	V	Tweed Heads Seagulls	Saturday, 18 July, 4:00pm	Browne Park	TBA
Townsville Blackhawks	V	Papua New Guinea Hunters	Saturday, 18 July, 5:00pm	Jack Manski Oval	TBA
Norths Devils	V	Northern Pride	Saturday, 18 July, 5:00pm	Premiers' Park	TBA
Ipswich Jets	V	Wynnum Manly Seagulls	Sunday, 19 July, 2:10pm	Ron Stark Oval	TBA
Burleigh Bears	BYE	Western Clydesdales
Mackay Cutters	BYE	Souths Logan Magpies
Brisbane Tigers	BYE
Round 19 (Country Week)
Northern Pride	V	Souths Logan Magpies	Saturday, 25 July, TBA	TBA	TBA
Townsville Blackhawks	V	Burleigh Bears	Saturday, 25 July, TBA	TBA	TBA
Mackay Cutters	V	Redcliffe Dolphins	Saturday, 25 July, TBA	TBA	TBA
Central Queensland Capras	V	Brisbane Tigers	Saturday, 25 July, TBA	TBA	TBA
Sunshine Coast Falcons	V	Norths Devils	Saturday, 25 July, TBA	TBA	TBA
Tweed Heads Seagulls	V	Wynnum Manly Seagulls	Saturday, 25 July, TBA	TBA	TBA
Western Clydesdales	V	Ipswich Jets	Saturday, 25 July, TBA	TBA	TBA
Papua New Guinea Hunters		BYE
Round 20
Burleigh Bears	V	Wynnum Manly Seagulls	Saturday, 8 August, 3:00pm	UAA Park	TBA
Northern Pride	V	Brisbane Tigers	Saturday, 8 August, 3:00pm	Barlow Park	TBA
Papua New Guinea Hunters	V	Redcliffe Dolphins	Saturday, 8 August, 3:30pm	Santos National Football Stadium	TBA
Central Queensland Capras	V	Norths Devils	Saturday, 8 August, 4:00pm	Browne Park	TBA
Sunshine Coast Falcons	V	Mackay Cutters	Saturday, 8 August, 5:00pm	Sunshine Coast Stadium	TBA
Western Clydesdales	V	Tweed Heads Seagulls	Sunday, 9 August, 2:00pm	Toowoomba Sports Ground	TBA
Souths Logan Magpies	V	Townsville Blackhawks	Sunday, 9 August, 3:00pm	Davies Park	TBA
Ipswich Jets		BYE
Round 21
Northern Pride	V	Burleigh Bears	Saturday, 15 August, 3:00pm	Barlow Park	TBA
Papua New Guinea Hunters	V	Western Clydesdales	Saturday, 15 August, 3:30pm	Santos National Football Stadium	TBA
Mackay Cutters	V	Townsville Blackhawks	Saturday, 15 August, 6:00pm	BB Print Stadium	TBA
Redcliffe Dolphins	V	Brisbane Tigers	Sunday, 16 August, 2:00pm	Kayo Stadium	TBA
Ipswich Jets	V	Souths Logan Magpies	Sunday, 16 August, 2:10pm	Richardson Park	TBA
Wynnum Manly Seagulls	V	Sunshine Coast Falcons	Sunday, 16 August, 3:00pm	BMD Kougari Oval	TBA
Central Queensland Capras	BYE	Norths Devils
Tweed Heads Seagulls	BYE
Round 22
Brisbane Tigers	V	Burleigh Bears	Saturday, 22 August, 3:00pm	Totally Workwear Stadium	TBA
Redcliffe Dolphins	V	Tweed Heads Seagulls	Saturday, 22 August, 4:00pm	Kayo Stadium	TBA
Central Queensland Capras	V	Northern Pride	Saturday, 22 August, 4:00pm	Browne Park	TBA
Sunshine Coast Falcons	V	Papua New Guinea Hunters	Saturday, 22 August, 5:00pm	Sunshine Coast Stadium	TBA
Norths Devils	V	Ipswich Jets	Saturday, 22 August, 5:00pm	Premiers' Park	TBA
Mackay Cutters	V	Western Clydesdales	Saturday, 22 August, 6:00pm	BB Print Stadium	TBA
Souths Logan Magpies	V	Wynnum Manly Seagulls	Sunday, 23 August, 3:00pm	Davies Park	TBA
Townsville Blackhawks		BYE
Round 23
Burleigh Bears	V	Central Queensland Capras	Saturday, 29 August, 3:00pm	UAA Park	TBA
Northern Pride	V	Papua New Guinea Hunters	Saturday, 29 August, 3:00pm	Barlow Park	TBA
Tweed Heads Seagulls	V	Mackay Cutters	Saturday, 29 August, 3:00pm	Preston Building Sports Complex	TBA
Townsville Blackhawks	V	Norths Devils	Saturday, 29 August, 5:00pm	Jack Manski Oval	TBA
Redcliffe Dolphins	V	Western Clydesdales	Sunday, 30 August, TBA	Kayo Stadium	TBA
Sunshine Coast Falcons	V	Ipswich Jets	Sunday, 30 August, 2:30pm	Sunshine Coast Stadium	TBA
Wynnum Manly Seagulls	V	Brisbane Tigers	Sunday, 30 August, 3:00pm	BMD Kougari Oval	TBA
Souths Logan Magpies		BYE
Finals Series
Qualifying & Elimination Finals
1st Place	V	4th Place	5/6 September	TBA	TBA
2nd Place	V	3rd Place	5/6 September	TBA	TBA
5th Place	V	8th Place	5/6 September	TBA	TBA
6th Place	V	7th Place	5/6 September	TBA	TBA
Semi-Finals
QF1 Loser	V	EF1 Winner	12/13 September	TBA	TBA
QF2 Loser	V	EF2 Winner	12/13 September	TBA	TBA
Preliminary Finals
QF2 Winner	V	SF1 Winner	19/20 September	TBA	TBA
QF1 Winner	V	SF2 Winner	19/20 September	TBA	TBA
Grand Final
PF1 Winner	V	PF2 Winner	26/27 September	TBA	TBA

==== Grand Final ====
Qualifying & Elimination Finals
1
4
5
8
6
7
2
3

Semi-Finals
1/4
5/8
2/3
6/7

Preliminary Finals
1/4
2/3/6/7
2/3
1/4/5/8

Grand Final

2026 Queensland Cup Grand Final

26/27 September 2026
TBA

PF1 Winner	v	PF2 Winner

TBA

=== Queensland Women's Premiership ===
2026 Queensland Women's Premiership
- Duration: 6 June – 26/27 September 2026
- Teams: 12
- Broadcast partners: Free to Air TV; Channel 9 (1 Match per week); Subscription TV; Fox League (1 Match per week); Streaming; QPlus TV (All Matches); 9Now (1 Match per week); Kayo Sports (1 Match per week)

The Queensland Women's Premiership (named the BMD Premiership for sponsorship reasons) is the premier women's Rugby League competition in Queensland. Nationally, along with the NSWRL Women's Premiership, the Queensland Women's Premiership is a Tier 2 competition and feeds into the Tier 1 National Rugby League Women's Premiership.

Since 2025 the season has more closely aligned with the NRLW season. Previously, the QRLWP season had started in February.

==== Teams ====
The line up remains the same as 2025, when Ipswich and Northern joined the competition to bring the number of teams to twelve.

There are only minor pathway and venue updates compared to 2025. In line with the updated Queensland Cup affiliations, the Sunshine Coast Falcons women are now listed as part of the Brisbane Broncos NRLW pathway, while the Tweed Heads Seagulls' home venue has been rebranded from Piggabeen Sports Complex to Seagulls Sporting Complex and the Central Queensland Capras women's home ground has been updated to Browne Park following renovations in Rockhampton. Head coaches for each club are yet to be confirmed and are therefore shown as TBA.

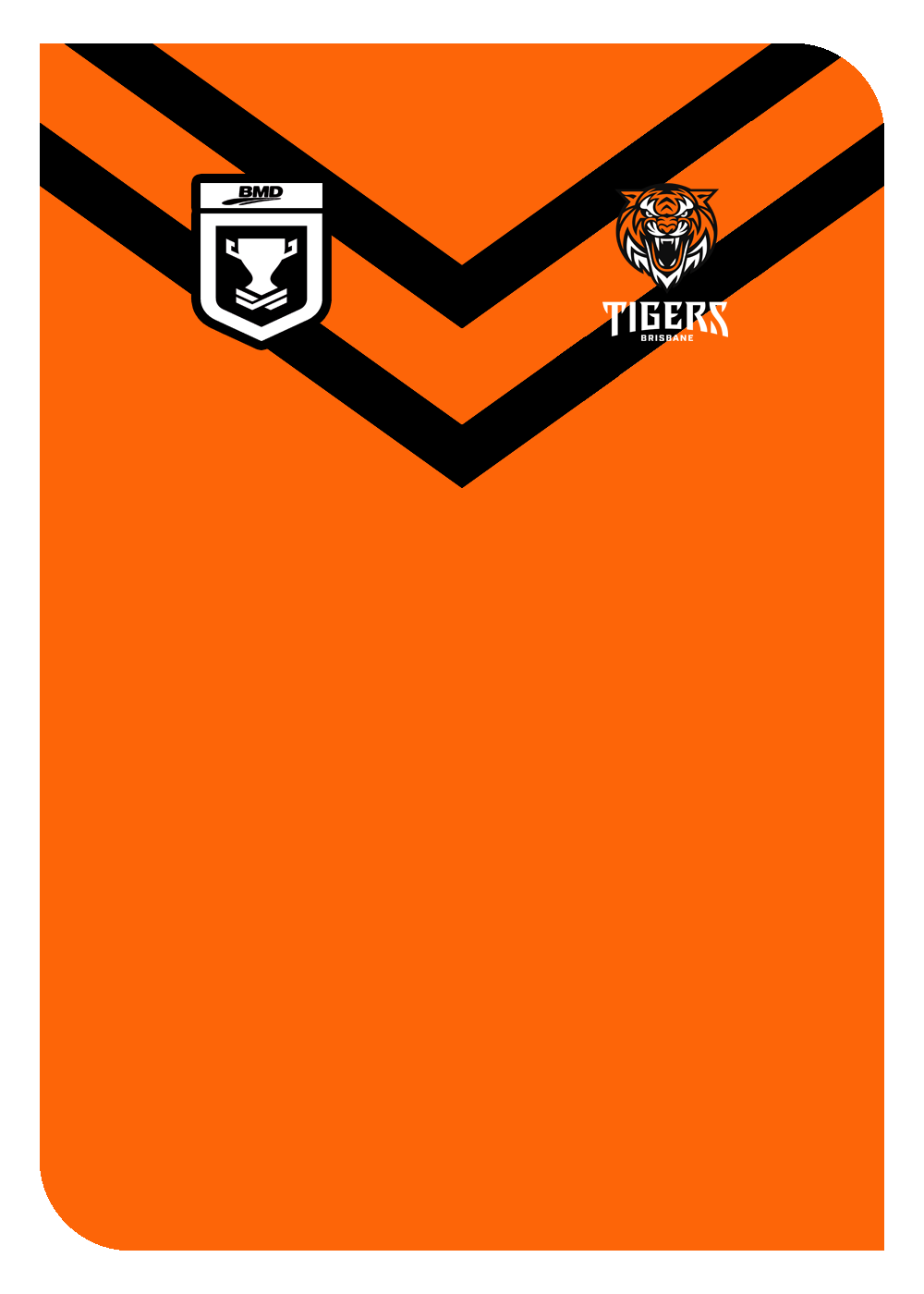
Brisbane Tigers Ground: Totally Workwear Stadium City/Suburb: Brisbane (Stones Corner) Coach: TBA Affiliate: TBA

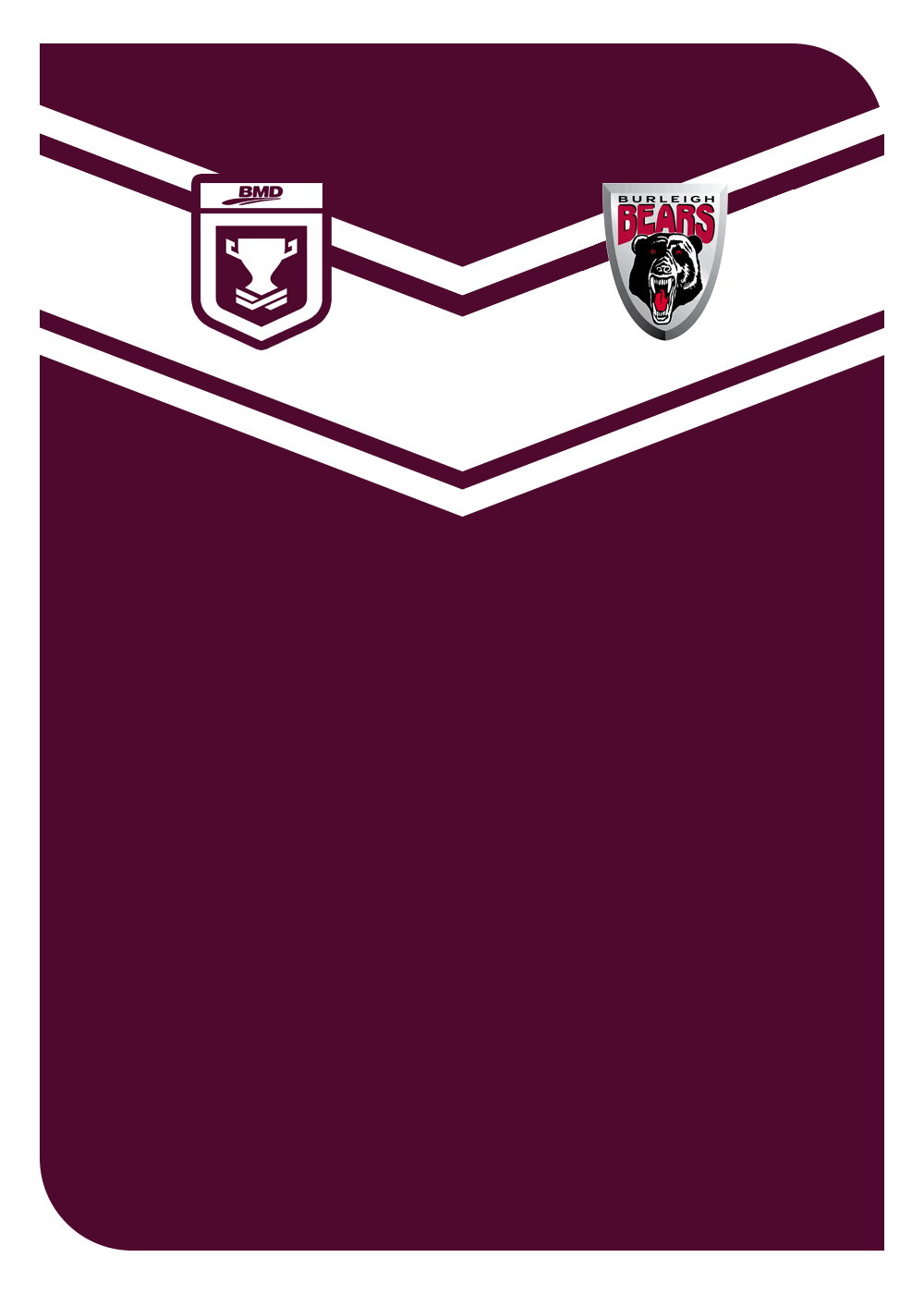
Burleigh Bears Ground: UAA Park City/Suburb: Gold Coast (Miami) Coach: TBA Affiliate: Brisbane Broncos

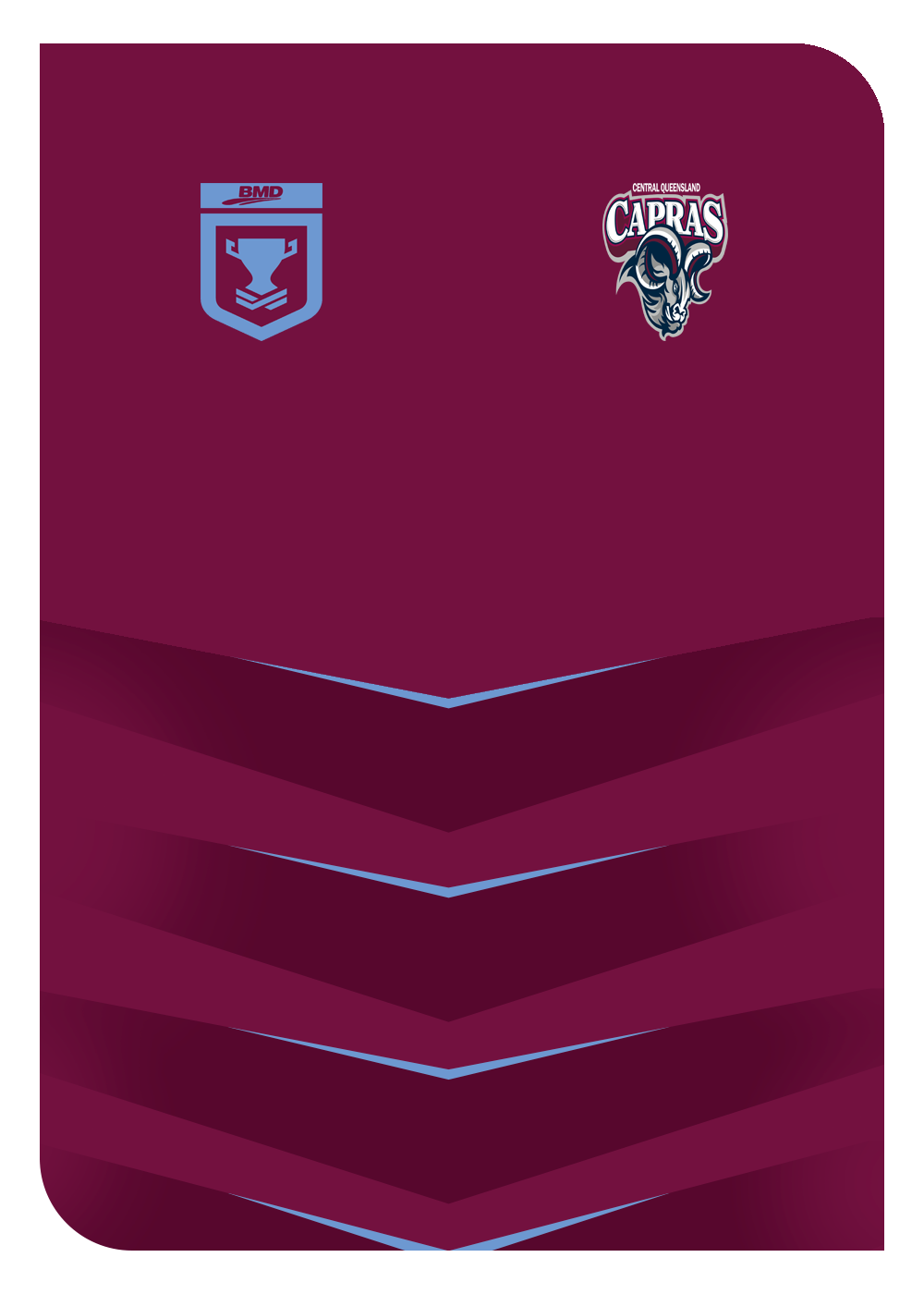
Central Queensland Capras Ground: Browne Park City/Suburb: Rockhampton (Wandal) Coach: TBA Affiliate: TBA

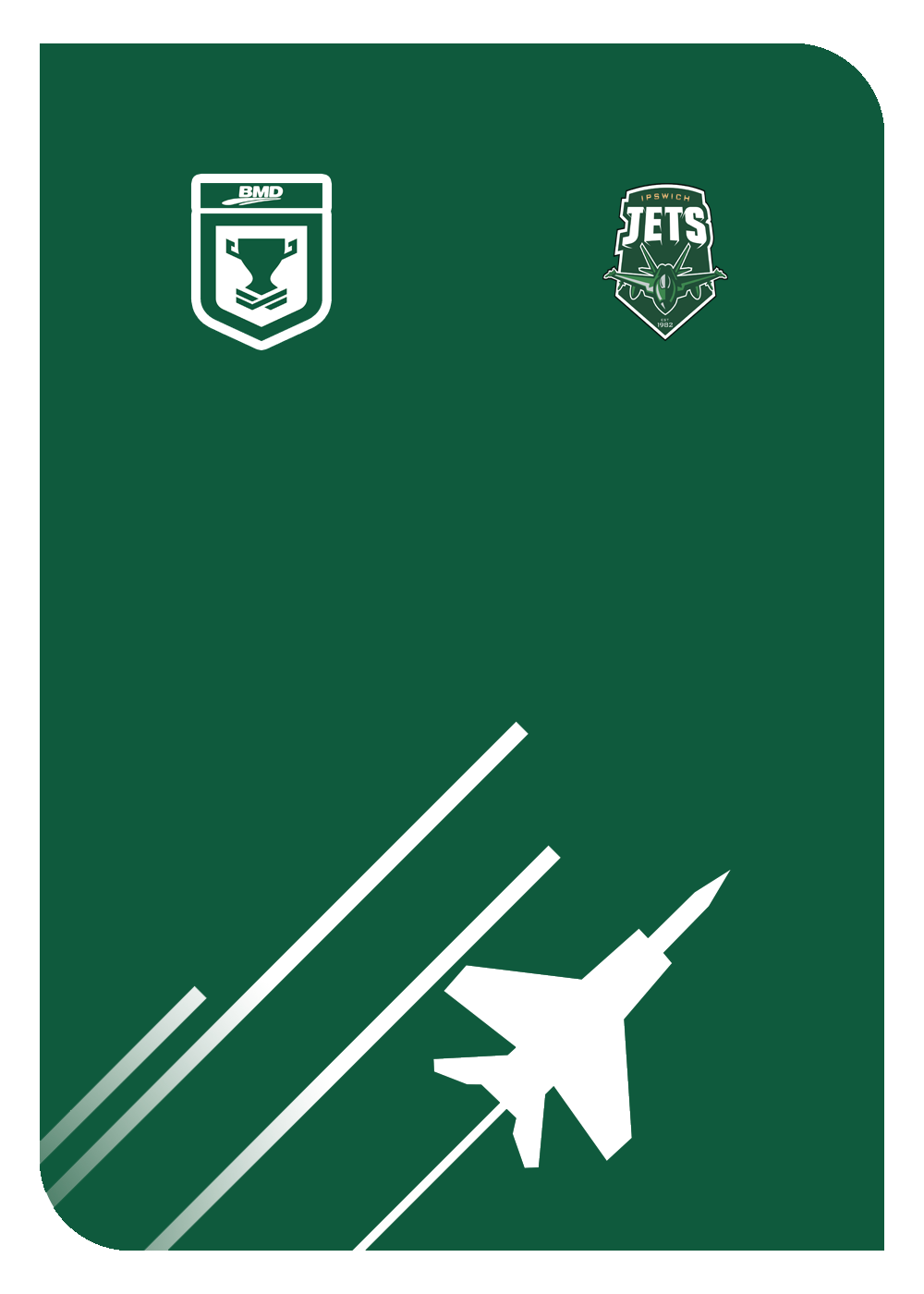
Ipswich Jets Ground: North Ipswich Reserve City/Suburb: Brisbane (Ipswich) Coach: TBA Affiliate: Gold Coast Titans

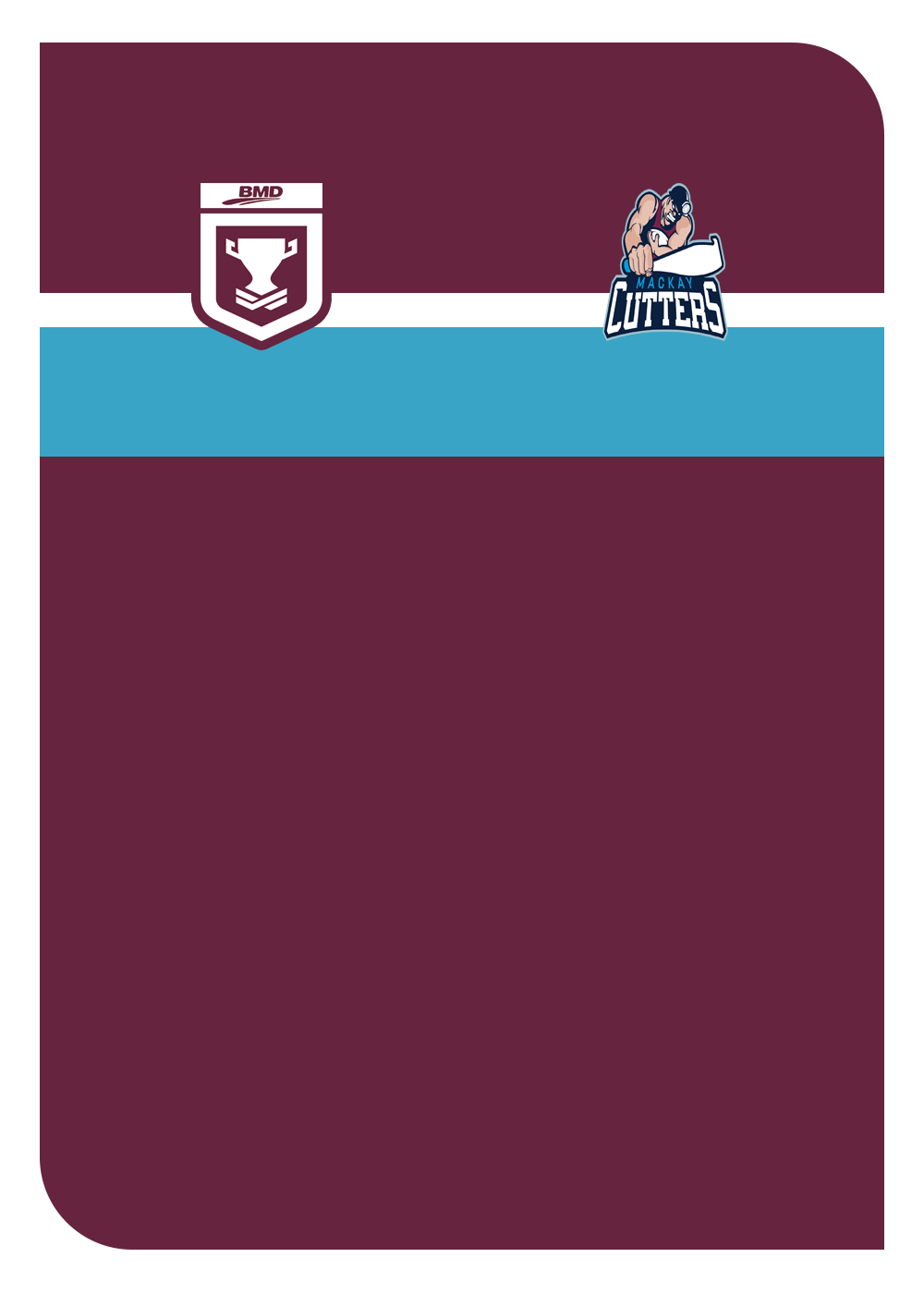
Mackay Cutters Ground: BB Print Stadium City/Suburb: Mackay (South Mackay) Coach: TBA Affiliate: North Queensland Cowboys

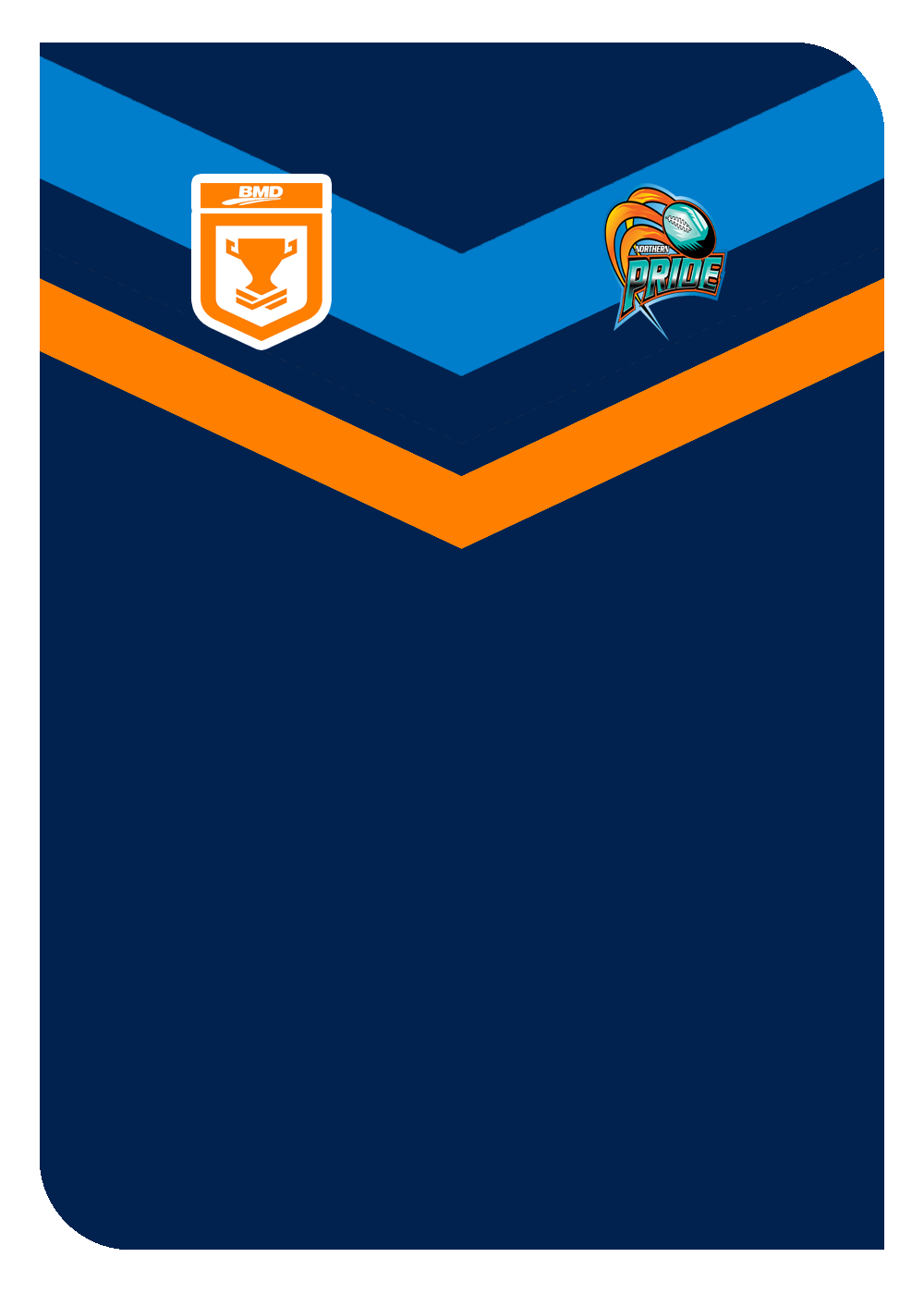
Northern Pride Ground: Barlow Park City/Suburb: Cairns (Parramatta Park) Coach: TBA Affiliate: North Queensland Cowboys

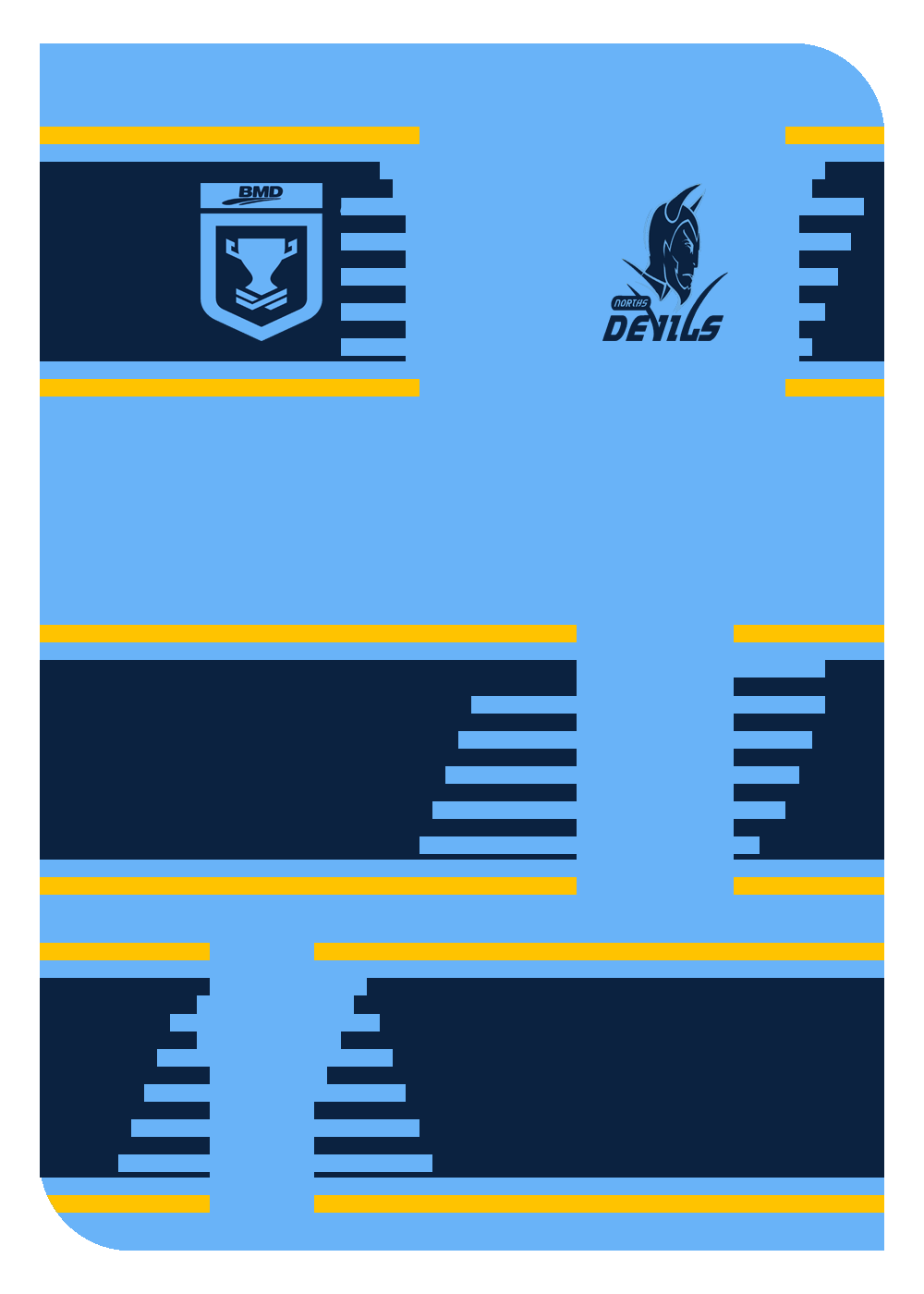
Norths Devils Ground: Premiers' Park City/Suburb: Brisbane (Nundah) Coach: TBA Affiliate: TBA

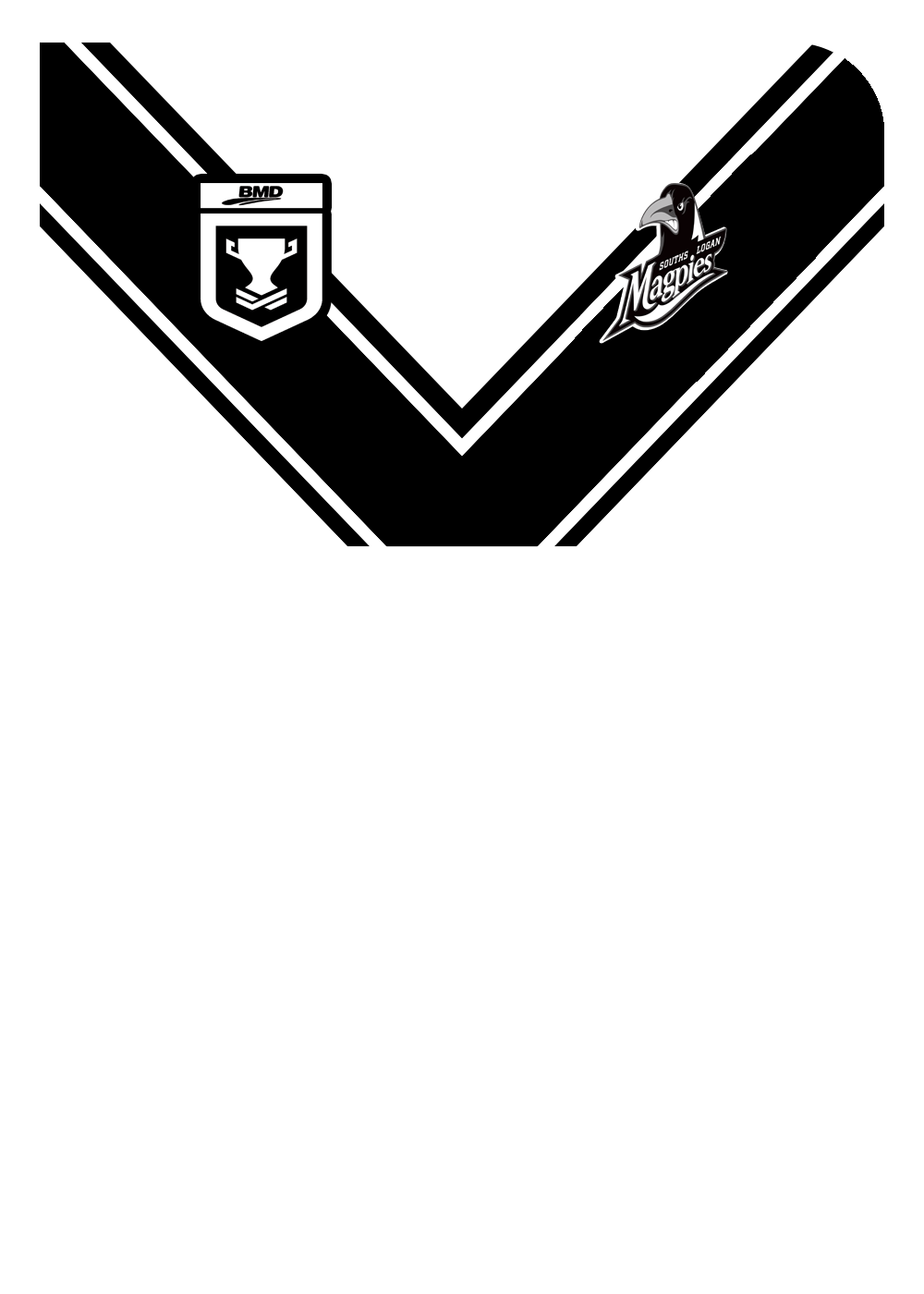
Souths Logan Magpies Ground: Davies Park City/Suburb: Brisbane (West End) Coach: TBA Affiliate: Brisbane Broncos

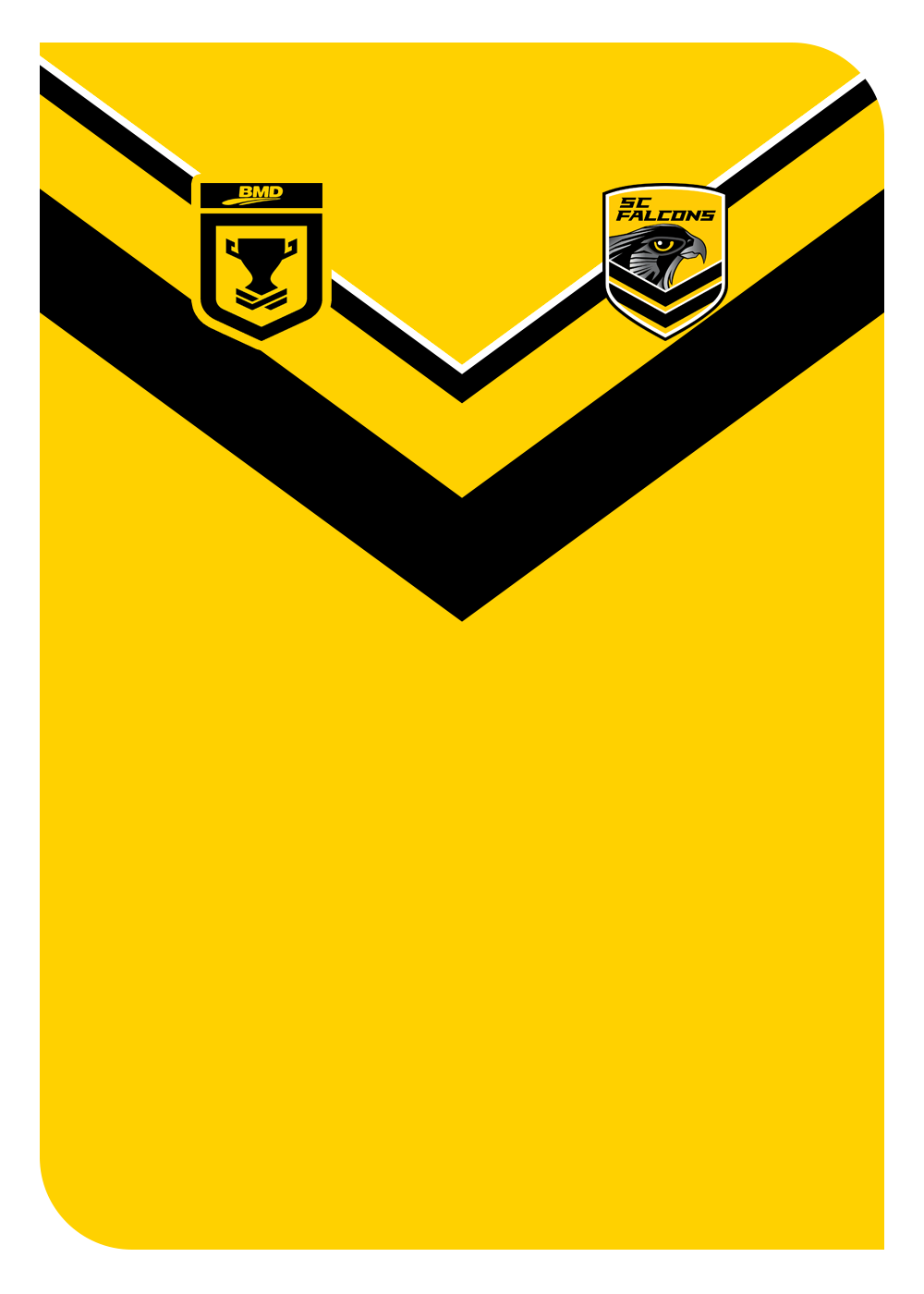
Sunshine Coast Falcons Ground: Sunshine Coast Stadium City/Suburb: Sunshine Coast (Bokarina) Coach: TBA Affiliate: Brisbane Broncos

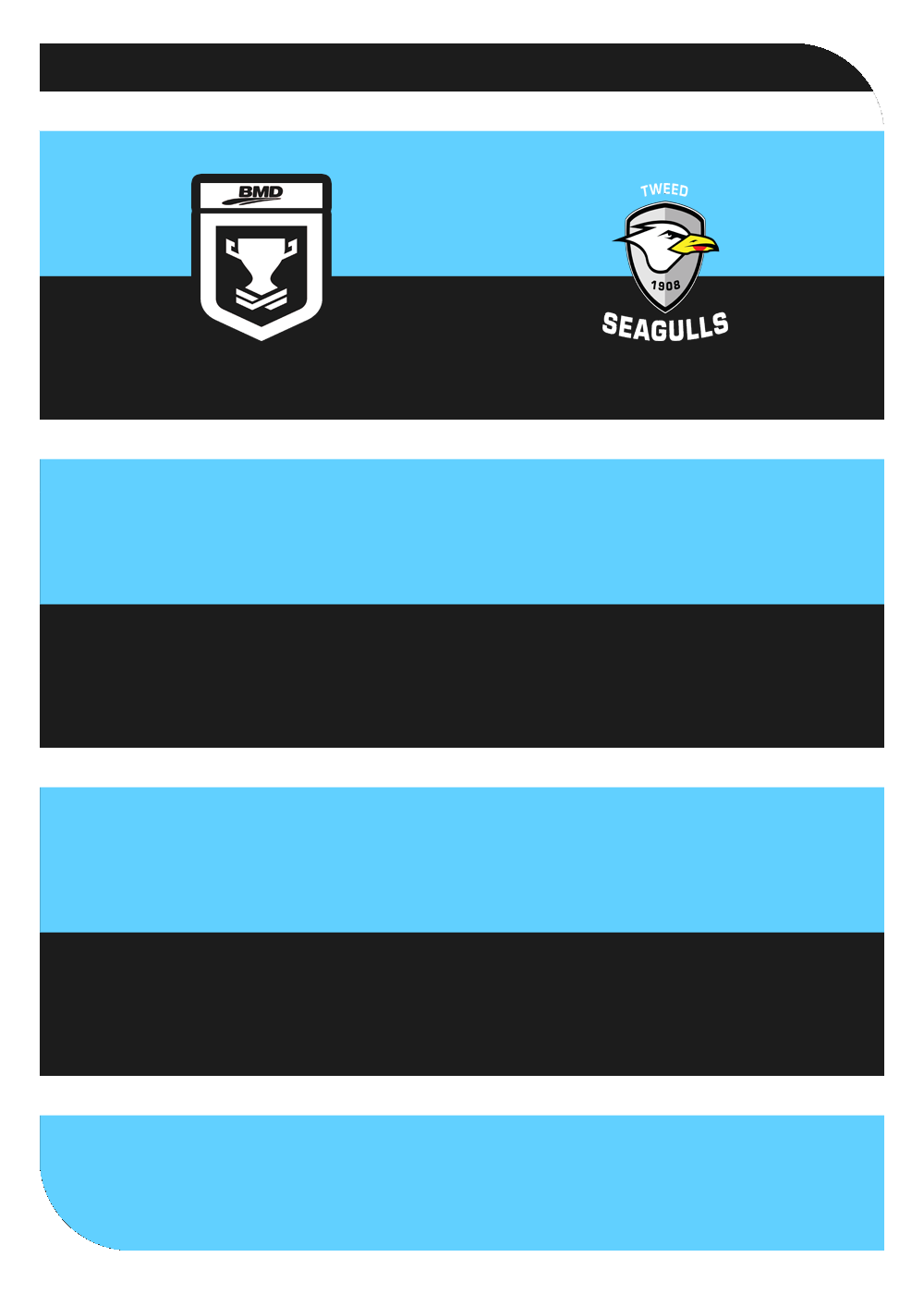
Tweed Heads Seagulls Ground: Preston Building Sports Complex City/Suburb: Tweed Heads (Tweed Heads West) Coach: TBA Affiliate: Gold Coast Titans

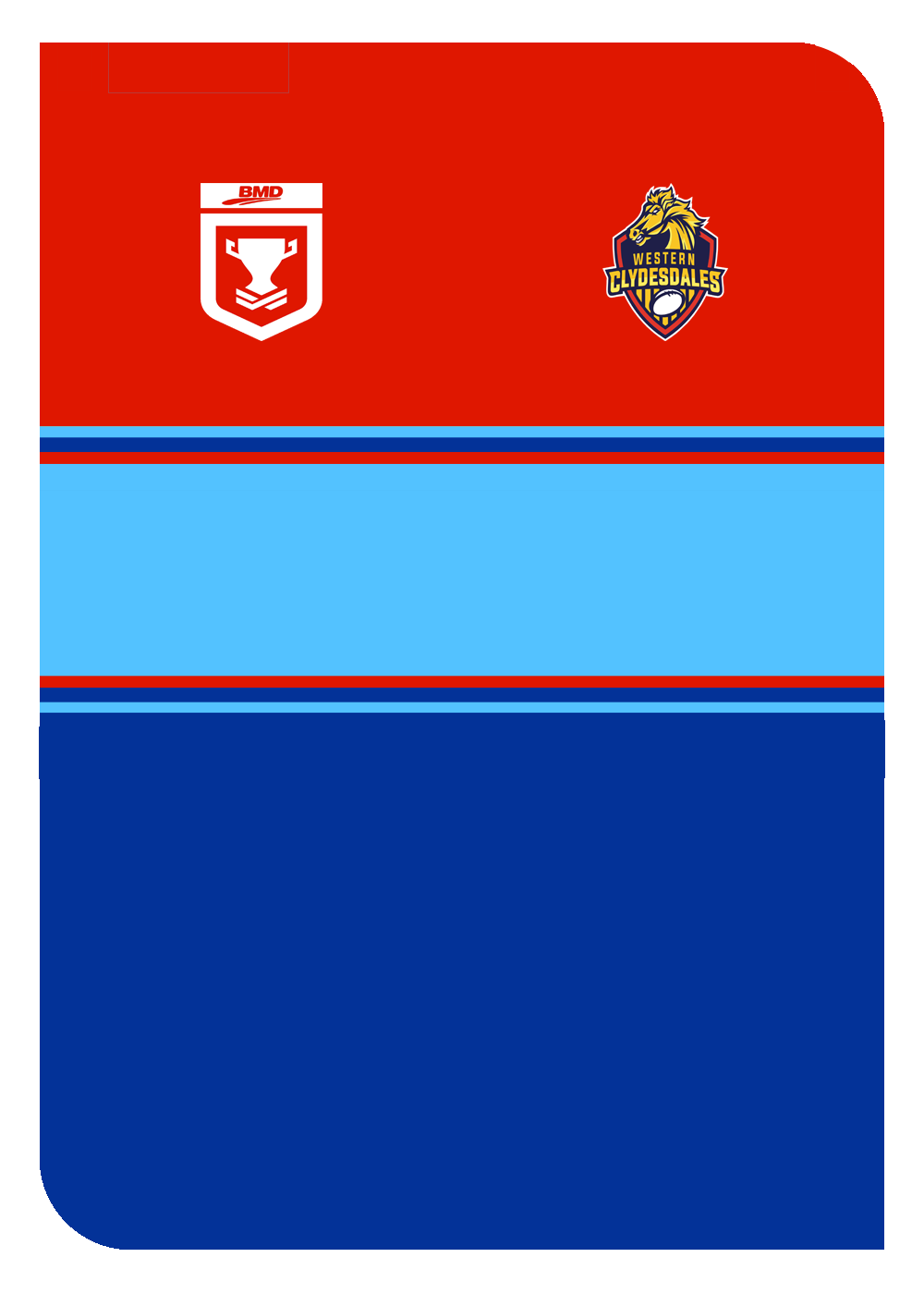
Western Clydesdales Ground: Toowoomba Sports Ground City/Suburb: Toowoomba (East Toowoomba) Coach: TBA Affiliate: TBA

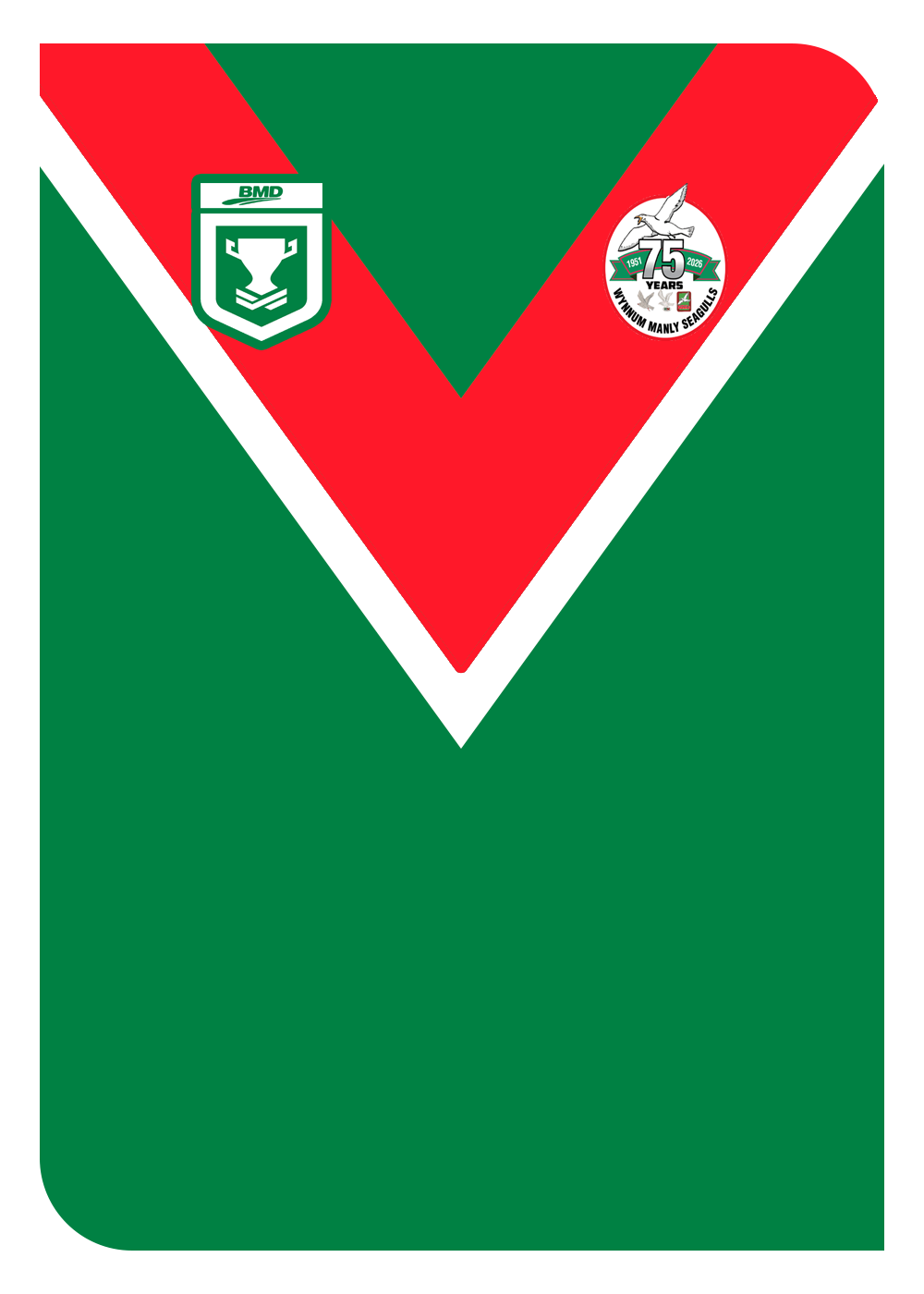
Wynnum Manly Seagulls Ground: BMD Kougari Oval City/Suburb: Brisbane (Manly West) Coach: TBA Affiliate: Brisbane Broncos

Queensland State Map	Brisbane Map
Home Venues	Home Venues

==== Ladder ====
Pos	Team	Pld	W	D	L	B	PF	PA	PD	Pts	Qualification
1	Brisbane Tigers (W)	0	0	0	0	0	0	0	0	0	Minor Premiers & Semi-Finals
2	Burleigh Bears (W)	0	0	0	0	0	0	0	0	0	Semi-Finals
3	Central Queensland Capras (W)	0	0	0	0	0	0	0	0	0	Elimination Finals
4	Ipswich Jets (W)	0	0	0	0	0	0	0	0	0	Elimination Finals
5	Mackay Cutters (W)	0	0	0	0	0	0	0	0	0	Elimination Finals
6	Norths Devils (W)	0	0	0	0	0	0	0	0	0	Elimination Finals
7	Northern Pride (W)	0	0	0	0	0	0	0	0	0	
8	Souths Logan Magpies (W)	0	0	0	0	0	0	0	0	0	
9	Sunshine Coast Falcons (W)	0	0	0	0	0	0	0	0	0	
10	Tweed Heads Seagulls (W)	0	0	0	0	0	0	0	0	0	
11	Western Clydesdales (W)	0	0	0	0	0	0	0	0	0	
12	Wynnum Manly Seagulls (W)	0	0	0	0	0	0	0	0	0	

Updated to match(es) played on 1 September. Source:
Rules for classification: 1) points; 2) point difference; 3) points scored

===== Ladder progression =====
- Numbers highlighted in green indicate that the team finished the round inside the top 6.
- Numbers highlighted in blue indicates the team finished first on the ladder in that round.
- Numbers highlighted in red indicates the team finished last place on the ladder in that round.
- Underlined numbers indicate that the team had a bye during that round.

Pos	Team	1	2	3	4	5	6	7	8	9	10	11
1	Brisbane Tigers (W)											
2	Burleigh Bears (W)											
3	Central Queensland Capras (W)											
4	Ipswich Jets (W)											
5	Mackay Cutters (W)											
6	Northern Pride (W)											
7	Norths Devils (W)											
8	Souths Logan Magpies (W)											
9	Sunshine Coast Falcons (W)											
10	Tweed Heads Seagulls (W)											
11	Western Clydesdales (W)											
12	Wynnum Manly Seagulls (W)											

Season Results:

Home	Score	Away	Match Information
Home	Score	Away	Date and Time	Venue	Referee	Video
Round 1
Brisbane Tigers (W)	V	Norths Devils (W)	Saturday, 6 June, 12:30pm	Totally Workwear Stadium	TBA
Burleigh Bears (W)	V	Sunshine Coast Falcons (W)	Saturday, 6 June, 1:15pm	UAA Park	TBA
Northern Pride (W)	V	Souths Logan Magpies (W)	Saturday, 6 June, 1:20pm	Barlow Park	TBA
Tweed Heads Seagulls (W)	V	Western Clydesdales (W)	Saturday, 6 June, 3:45pm	Preston Building Sports Complex	TBA
Ipswich Jets (W)	V	Mackay Cutters (W)	Sunday, 7 June, 2:00pm	Richardson Park	TBA
Wynnum Manly Seagulls (W)	V	Central Queensland Capras (W)	Sunday, 7 June, 3:00pm	BMD Kougari Oval	TBA
Round 2
Brisbane Tigers (W)	V	Sunshine Coast Falcons (W)	Saturday, 13 June, 1:00pm	Totally Workwear Stadium	TBA
Central Queensland Capras (W)	V	Western Clydesdales (W)	Saturday, 13 June, 2:00pm	Browne Park	TBA
Tweed Heads Seagulls (W)	V	Northern Pride (W)	Saturday, 13 June, 3:00pm	Preston Building Sports Complex	TBA
Norths Devils (W)	V	Burleigh Bears (W)	Saturday, 13 June, 3:20pm	Premiers' Park	TBA
Mackay Cutters (W)	V	Souths Logan Magpies (W)	Saturday, 13 June, 4:00pm	BB Print Stadium	TBA
Wynnum Manly Seagulls (W)	V	Ipswich Jets (W)	Sunday, 14 June, 3:00pm	BMD Kougari Oval	TBA
Round 3
Central Queensland Capras (W)	V	Souths Logan Magpies (W)	Saturday, 20 June, 2:00pm	Browne Park	TBA
Sunshine Coast Falcons (W)	V	Northern Pride (W)	Saturday, 20 June, 3:30pm	Sunshine Coast Stadium	TBA
Mackay Cutters (W)	V	Brisbane Tigers (W)	Saturday, 20 June, 4:00pm	BB Print Stadium	TBA
Norths Devils (W)	V	Wynnum Manly Seagulls (W)	Sunday, 21 June, 11:50am	Premiers' Park	TBA
Ipswich Jets (W)	V	Tweed Heads Seagulls (W)	Sunday, 21 June, 2:00pm	Richardson Park	TBA
Western Clydesdales (W)	V	Burleigh Bears (W)	Sunday, 21 June, 2:00pm	Toowoomba Sports Ground	TBA
Round 4
Brisbane Tigers (W)	V	Ipswich Jets (W)	Saturday, 27 June, 12:30pm	Totally Workwear Stadium	TBA
Burleigh Bears (W)	V	Tweed Heads Seagulls (W)	Saturday, 27 June, 1:15pm	UAA Park	TBA
Northern Pride (W)	V	Wynnum Manly Seagulls (W)	Saturday, 27 June, 1:20pm	Barlow Park	TBA
Central Queensland Capras (W)	V	Mackay Cutters (W)	Saturday, 27 June, 2:00pm	Browne Park	TBA
Western Clydesdales (W)	V	Sunshine Coast Falcons (W)	Sunday, 28 June, 12:30pm	Toowoomba Sports Ground	TBA
Souths Logan Magpies (W)	V	Norths Devils (W)	Sunday, 28 June, 1:20pm	Davies Park	TBA
Round 5
Northern Pride (W)	V	Ipswich Jets (W)	Saturday, 4 July, 1:20pm	Barlow Park	TBA
Tweed Heads Seagulls (W)	V	Brisbane Tigers (W)	Saturday, 4 July, 2:15pm	Preston Building Sports Complex	TBA
Sunshine Coast Falcons (W)	V	Central Queensland Capras (W)	Saturday, 4 July, 3:30pm	Sunshine Coast Stadium	TBA
Mackay Cutters (W)	V	Norths Devils (W)	Sunday, 5 July, 12:00pm	BB Print Stadium	TBA
Wynnum Manly Seagulls (W)	V	Western Clydesdales (W)	Sunday, 5 July, 1:20pm	BMD Kougari Oval	TBA
Souths Logan Magpies (W)	V	Burleigh Bears (W)	Sunday, 5 July, 1:20pm	Davies Park	TBA
Round 6
Burleigh Bears (W)	V	Mackay Cutters (W)	Saturday, 11 July, 1:15pm	UAA Park	TBA
Tweed Heads Seagulls (W)	V	Wynnum Manly Seagulls (W)	Saturday, 11 July, 3:45pm	Preston Building Sports Complex	TBA
Norths Devils (W)	V	Sunshine Coast Falcons (W)	Saturday, 11 July, 4:00pm	Premiers' Park	TBA
Ipswich Jets (W)	V	Central Queensland Capras (W)	Sunday, 12 July, 12:00pm	Richardson Park	TBA
Western Clydesdales (W)	V	Northern Pride (W)	Sunday, 12 July, 12:30pm	Toowoomba Sports Ground	TBA
Brisbane Tigers (W)	V	Souths Logan Magpies (W)	Sunday, 12 July, 12:30pm	Totally Workwear Stadium	TBA
Round 7
Wynnum Manly Seagulls (W)	V	Mackay Cutters (W)	Saturday, 18 July, 12:30pm	Ron Stark Oval	TBA
Brisbane Tigers (W)	V	Western Clydesdales (W)	Saturday, 18 July, 1:00pm	Totally Workwear Stadium	TBA
Central Queensland Capras (W)	V	Tweed Heads Seagulls (W)	Saturday, 18 July, 2:00pm	Browne Park	TBA
Norths Devils (W)	V	Northern Pride (W)	Saturday, 18 July, 3:20pm	Premiers' Park	TBA
Ipswich Jets (W)	V	Burleigh Bears (W)	Sunday, 19 July, 12:00pm	Richardson Park	TBA
Souths Logan Magpies (W)	V	Sunshine Coast Falcons (W)	Sunday, 19 July, 1:20pm	Davies Park	TBA
Round 8
Burleigh Bears (W)	V	Wynnum Manly Seagulls (W)	Saturday, 8 August, 1:15pm	UAA Park	TBA
Northern Pride (W)	V	Brisbane Tigers (W)	Saturday, 8 August, 1:20pm	Barlow Park	TBA
Central Queensland Capras (W)	V	Norths Devils (W)	Saturday, 8 August, 3:00pm	Browne Park	TBA
Sunshine Coast Falcons (W)	V	Mackay Cutters (W)	Saturday, 8 August, 3:30pm	Sunshine Coast Stadium	TBA
Western Clydesdales (W)	V	Ipswich Jets (W)	Sunday, 9 August, 12:30pm	Toowoomba Sports Ground	TBA
Souths Logan Magpies (W)	V	Tweed Heads Seagulls (W)	Sunday, 9 August, 1:20pm	Davies Park	TBA
Round 9
Northern Pride (W)	V	Burleigh Bears (W)	Saturday, 15 August, 1:20pm	Barlow Park	TBA
Western Clydesdales (W)	V	Norths Devils (W)	Saturday, 15 August, 2:00pm	Toowoomba Sports Ground	TBA
Central Queensland Capras (W)	V	Brisbane Tigers (W)	Saturday, 15 August, 4:00pm	Browne Park	TBA
Mackay Cutters (W)	V	Tweed Heads Seagulls (W)	Saturday, 15 August, 4:00pm	BB Print Stadium	TBA
Ipswich Jets (W)	V	Souths Logan Magpies (W)	Sunday, 16 August, 12:00pm	Richardson Park	TBA
Wynnum Manly Seagulls (W)	V	Sunshine Coast Falcons (W)	Sunday, 16 August, 1:20pm	BMD Kougari Oval	TBA
Round 10
Brisbane Tigers (W)	V	Burleigh Bears (W)	Saturday, 22 August, 12:30pm	Totally Workwear Stadium	TBA
Central Queensland Capras (W)	V	Northern Pride (W)	Saturday, 22 August, 2:00pm	Browne Park	TBA
Norths Devils (W)	V	Ipswich Jets (W)	Saturday, 22 August, 3:20pm	Premiers' Park	TBA
Sunshine Coast Falcons (W)	V	Tweed Heads Seagulls (W)	Saturday, 22 August, 3:30pm	Sunshine Coast Stadium	TBA
Mackay Cutters (W)	V	Western Clydesdales (W)	Saturday, 22 August, 4:00pm	BB Print Stadium	TBA
Souths Logan Magpies (W)	V	Wynnum Manly Seagulls (W)	Sunday, 23 August, 1:20pm	Davies Park	TBA
Round 11
Burleigh Bears (W)	V	Central Queensland Capras (W)	Saturday, 29 August, 1:15pm	UAA Park	TBA
Tweed Heads Seagulls (W)	V	Norths Devils (W)	Saturday, 29 August, 1:15pm	Preston Building Sports Complex	TBA
Northern Pride (W)	V	Mackay Cutters (W)	Saturday, 29 August, 1:20pm	Barlow Park	TBA
Sunshine Coast Falcons (W)	V	Ipswich Jets (W)	Sunday, 30 August, 1:00pm	Sunshine Coast Stadium	TBA
Wynnum Manly Seagulls (W)	V	Brisbane Tigers (W)	Sunday, 30 August, 1:20pm	BMD Kougari Oval	TBA
Souths Logan Magpies (W)	V	Western Clydesdales (W)	Sunday, 30 August, 1:20pm	Davies Park	TBA
Finals Series
Elimination Finals
4th Place	V	5th Place	12/13 September	TBA	TBA
3rd Place	V	6th Place	12/13 September	TBA	TBA
Semi-Finals
1st Place	V	Lowest Ranked EF Winner	19/20 September	TBA	TBA
2nd Place	V	Highest Ranked EF Winner	19/20 September	TBA	TBA
Grand Final
SF1 Winner	V	SF2 Winner	26/27 September	TBA	TBA

==== Grand Final ====
Elimination Finals
4
5
3
6

Semi-Finals
1
4/5/6
2
3/4/5

Grand Final

2026 Queensland Women's Premiership Grand Final

26/27 September 2026
TBA

PF1 Winner	v	PF2 Winner

TBA

== Age Based Competitions ==
=== NRLQ Series ===
2026 NRLQ Series
- Duration: 2 April – 15 August 2026
- Teams: 4
- Broadcast partners: Streaming; QPlus TV (All Matches)

The NRLQ Series is an under 21s Rugby League competition in Queensland. It features the four Queensland-based NRL teams and is designed to bridge the gap between the Mal Meninga Cup and Queensland Cup.

In 2025 there was no finals series, with the top ranked team being declared the winner.

==== Teams ====
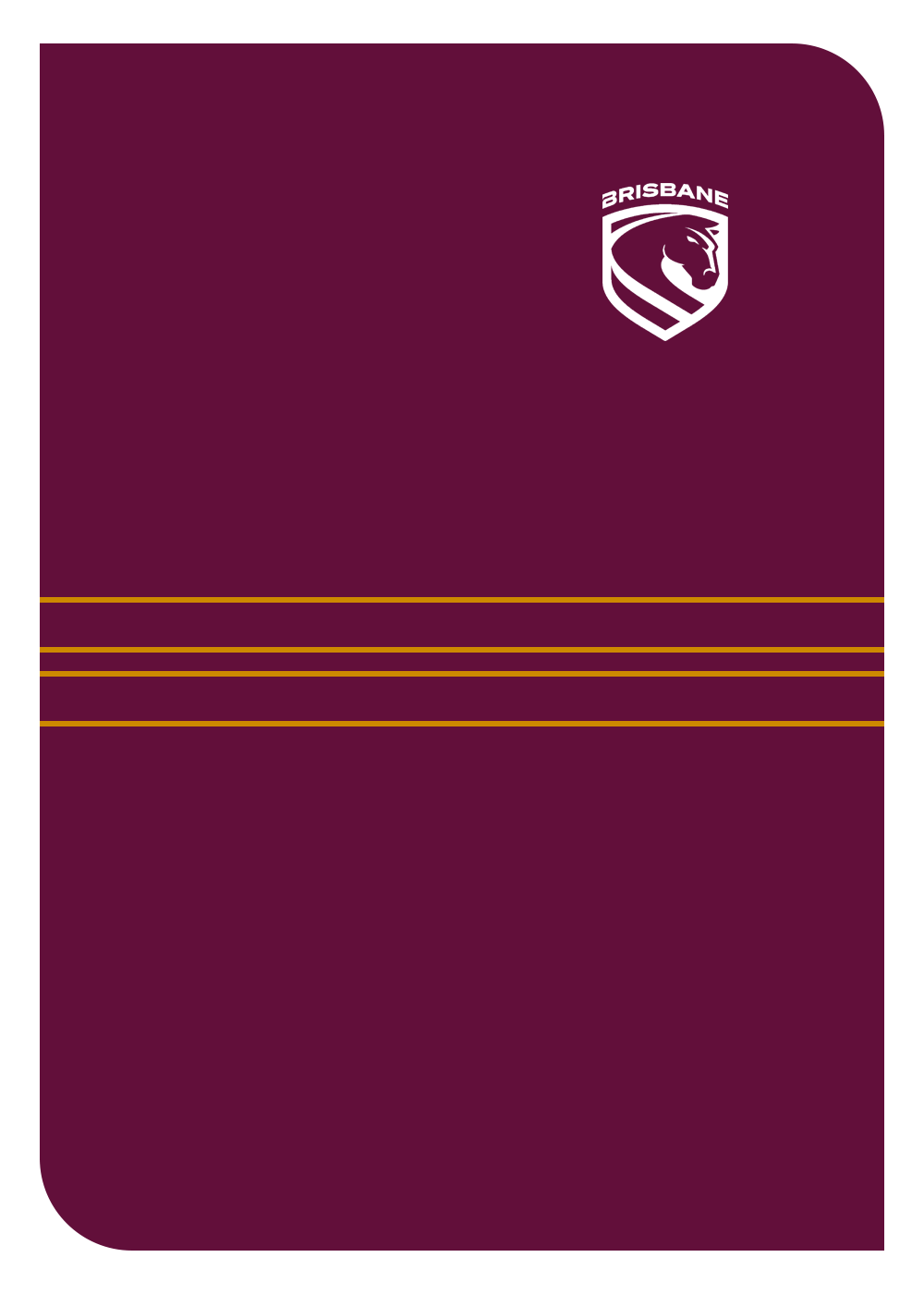
Brisbane Broncos Ground: Suncorp Stadium City/Suburb: Brisbane (Milton) Coach: TBA Affiliate: Brisbane Broncos

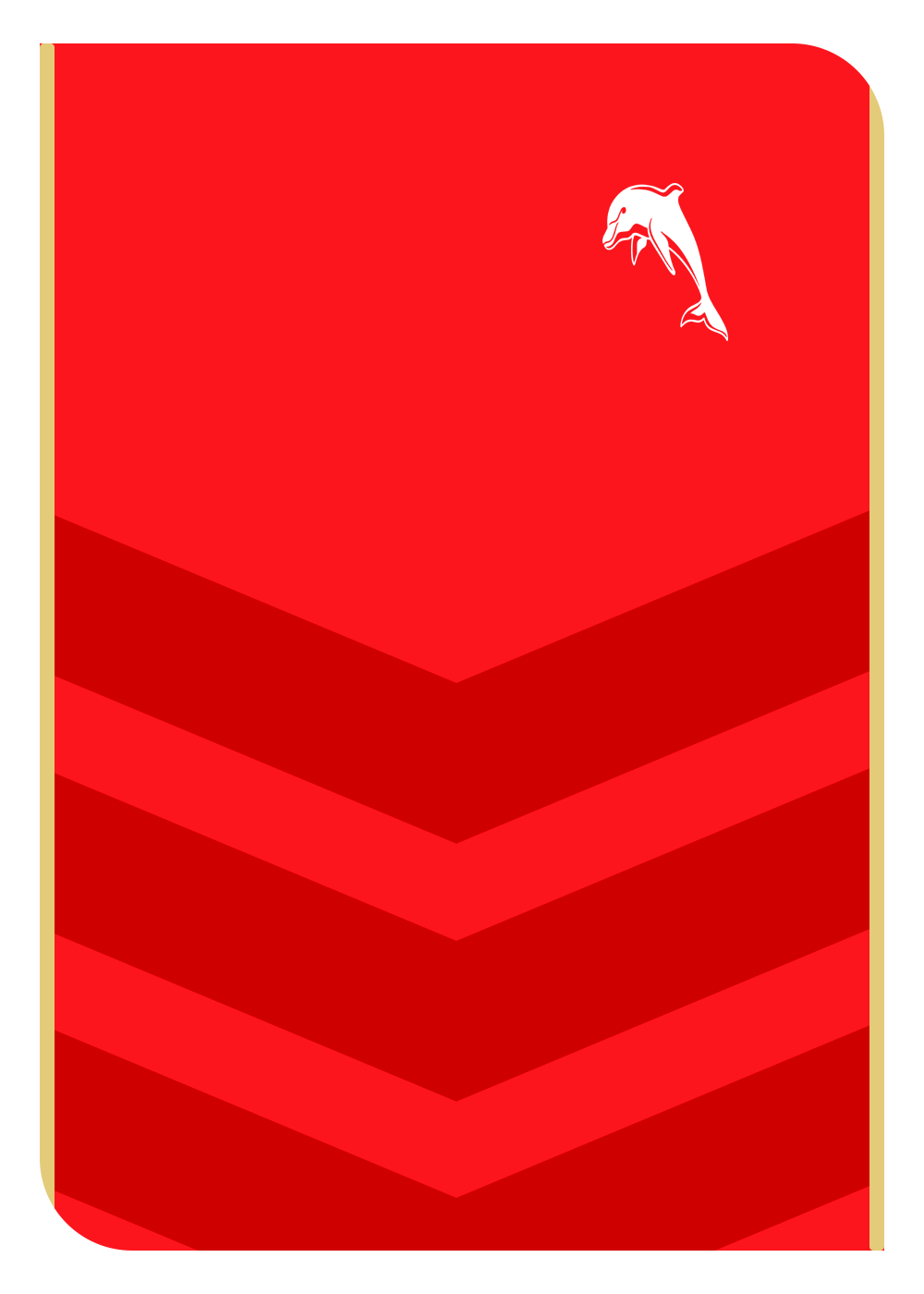
Dolphins Ground: Kayo Stadium City/Suburb: Brisbane (Redcliffe) Coach: TBA Affiliate: Dolphins

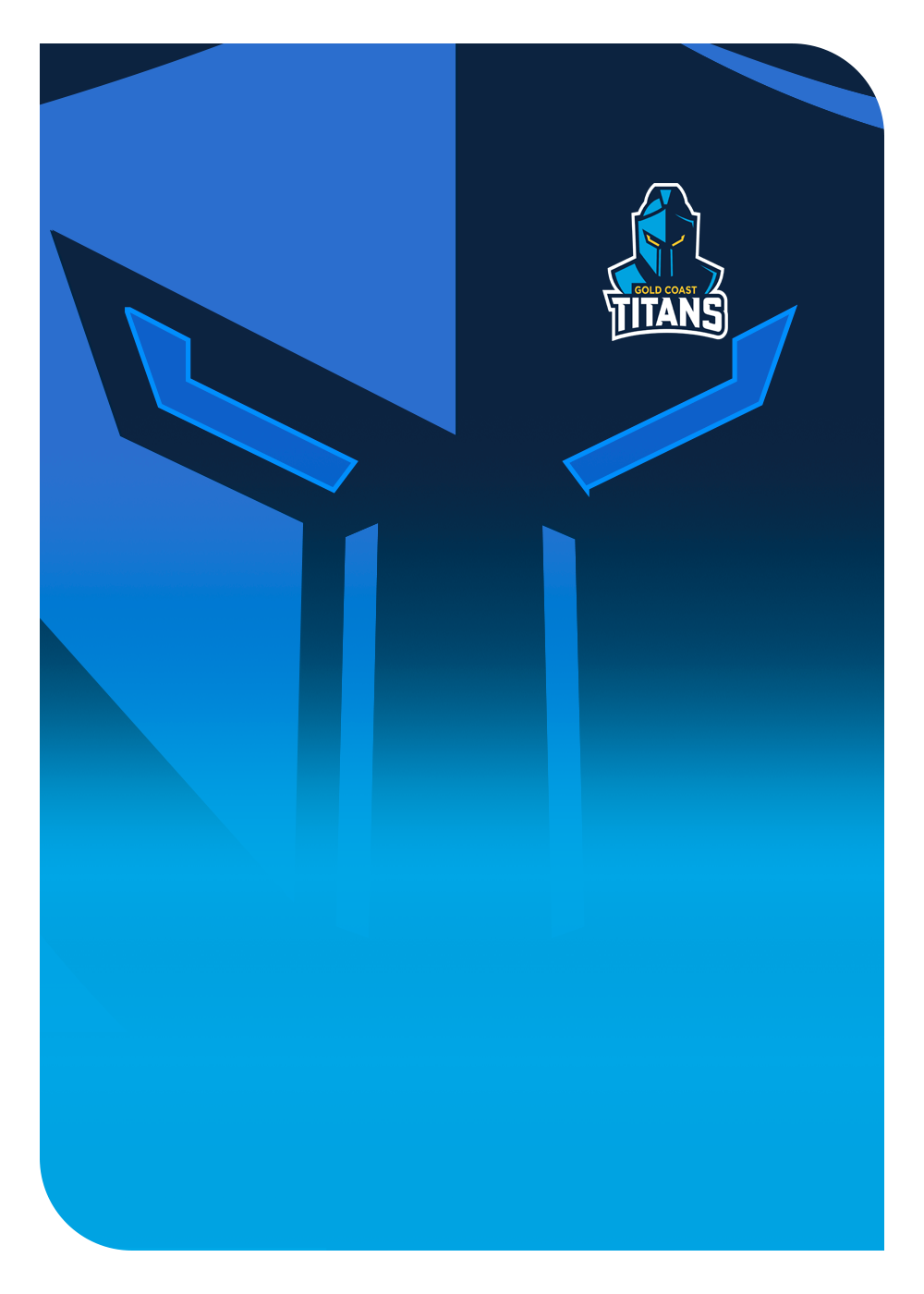
Gold Coast Titans Ground: Cbus Super Stadium City/Suburb: Gold Coast (Robina) Coach: TBA Affiliate: Gold Coast Titans

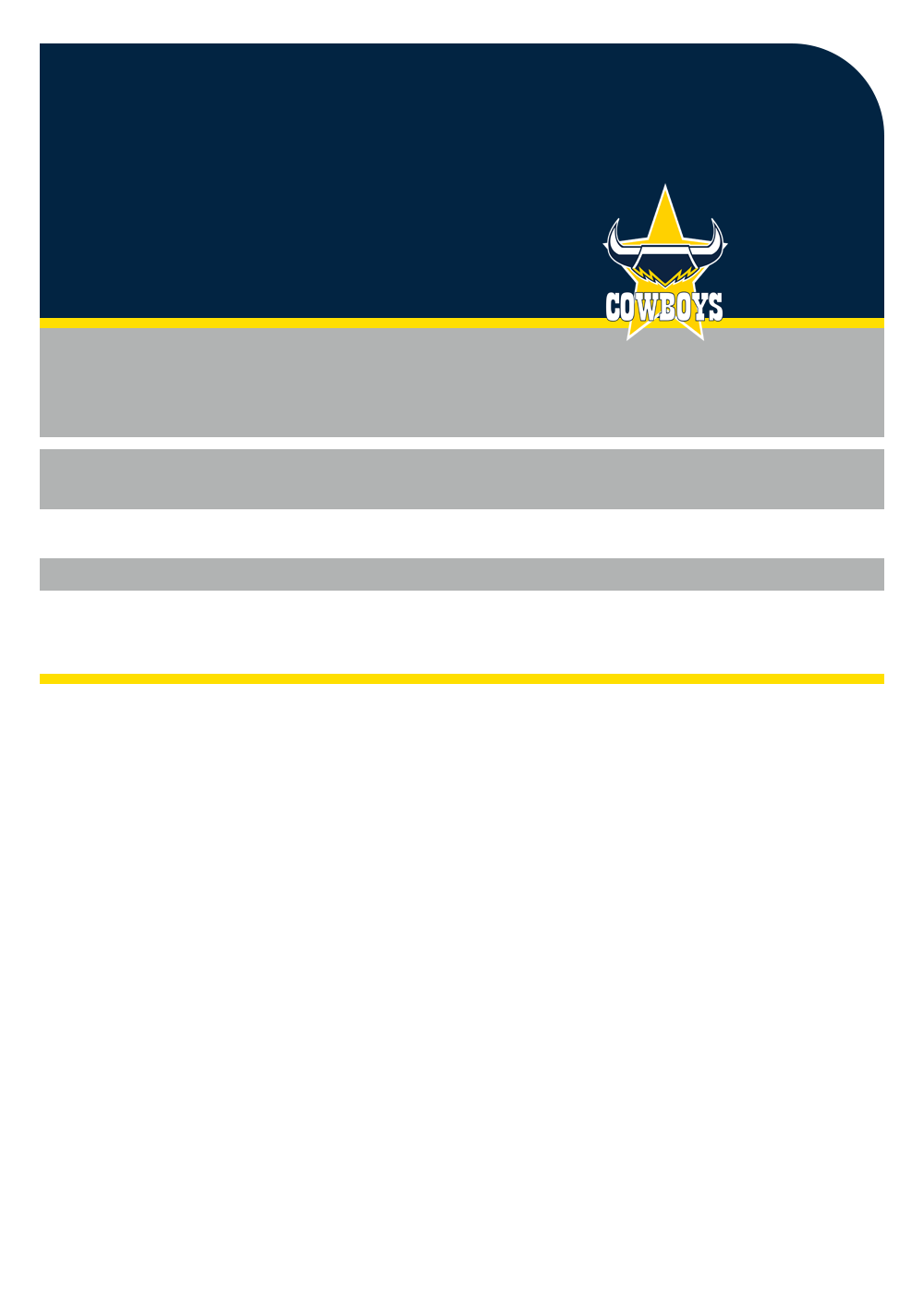
North Queensland Cowboys Ground: Queensland Country Bank Stadium City/Suburb: Townsville (South Townsville) Coach: TBA Affiliate: North Queensland Cowboys

==== Ladder ====
Pos	Team	Pld	W	D	L	B	PF	PA	PD	Pts	Qualification
1	Dolphins (U21s)	0	0	0	0	0	0	0	0	0	Grand Final
2	Brisbane Broncos (U21s)	0	0	0	0	0	0	0	0	0	Grand Final
3	North Queensland Cowboys (U21s)	0	0	0	0	0	0	0	0	0	
4	Gold Coast Titans (U21s)	0	0	0	0	0	0	0	0	0	

Updated to match(es) played on unknown. Source:
Rules for classification: 1) points; 2) point difference; 3) points scored

===== Ladder progression =====
- Numbers highlighted in green indicate that the team finished the round inside the top 2.
- Numbers highlighted in red indicates the team finished last place on the ladder in that round.

Pos	Team	1	2	3	4	5	6	7	8	9	10	11	12
1	Dolphins (U21s)												
2	Brisbane Broncos (U21s)												
3	North Queensland Cowboys (U21s)												
4	Gold Coast Titans (U21s)												

==== Season Results ====
Season Results:

Home	Score	Away	Match Information
Home	Score	Away	Date and Time	Venue	Referee	Video
Round 1
Dolphins (U21s)	V	North Queensland Cowboys (U21s)	Thursday, 2 April, 5:15pm	Kayo Stadium	Nick McEwan
Gold Coast Titans (U21s)	V	Brisbane Broncos (U21s)	Saturday, 4 April, 5:05pm	Cbus Super Stadium	Izzy Davidson
Round 2
Dolphins (U21s)	V	Gold Coast Titans (U21s)	Saturday, 11 April, 1:20pm	Premiers' Park	TBA
Brisbane Broncos (U21s)	V	North Queensland Cowboys (U21s)	Saturday, 11 April, 3:10pm	Sunshine Coast Stadium	TBA
Round 3
North Queensland Cowboys (U21s)	V	Gold Coast Titans (U21s)	Saturday, 18 April, 3:20pm	Jack Manski Oval	TBA
Dolphins (U21s)	V	Brisbane Broncos (U21s)	Saturday, 18 April, 5:00pm	Kayo Stadium	TBA
Round 4
Gold Coast Titans (U21s)	V	Brisbane Broncos (U21s)	Saturday, 16 May, TBA	Kayo Stadium	TBA
North Queensland Cowboys (U21s)	V	Dolphins (U21s)	Saturday, 16 May, TBA	Kayo Stadium	TBA
Round 5
North Queensland Cowboys (U21s)	V	Brisbane Broncos (U21s)	Sunday, 24 May, 1:35pm	Queensland Country Bank Stadium	TBA
Dolphins (U21s)	V	Gold Coast Titans (U21s)	Sunday, 24 May, 4:10pm	Premiers' Park	TBA
Round 6
Gold Coast Titans (U21s)	V	North Queensland Cowboys (U21s)	Saturday, 30 May, 1:00pm	Preston Building Sports Complex	TBA
Brisbane Broncos (U21s)	V	Dolphins (U21s)	Saturday, 30 May, 1:10pm	BMD Kougari Oval	TBA
Round 7
North Queensland Cowboys (U21s)	V	Dolphins (U21s)	Saturday, 6 June, 2:20pm	Queensland Country Bank Stadium	TBA
Brisbane Broncos (U21s)	V	Gold Coast Titans (U21s)	Saturday, 6 June, 4:45pm	UAA Park	TBA
Round 8
Gold Coast Titans (U21s)	V	Dolphins (U21s)	Friday, 26 June, 3:35pm	Cbus Super Stadium	TBA
Brisbane Broncos (U21s)	V	North Queensland Cowboys (U21s)	Saturday, 27 June, 1:15pm	UAA Park	TBA
Round 9
Dolphins (U21s)	V	Brisbane Broncos (U21s)	Saturday, 18 July, 2:00pm	Kayo Stadium	TBA
North Queensland Cowboys (U21s)	V	Gold Coast Titans (U21s)	Saturday, 18 July, 3:20pm	Jack Manski Oval	TBA
Round 10
Brisbane Broncos (U21s)	V	Gold Coast Titans (U21s)	Saturday, 25 July, TBA	Kayo Stadium	TBA
Dolphins (U21s)	V	North Queensland Cowboys (U21s)	Saturday, 25 July, TBA	Kayo Stadium	TBA
Round 11
North Queensland Cowboys (U21s)	V	Brisbane Broncos (U21s)	Thursday, 30 July, 5:15pm	Queensland Country Bank Stadium	TBA
Gold Coast Titans (U21s)	V	Dolphins (U21s)	Saturday, 1 August, 12:10pm	Cbus Super Stadium	TBA
Round 12
Gold Coast Titans (U21s)	V	North Queensland Cowboys (U21s)	Thursday, 6 August, 5:25pm	Cbus Super Stadium	TBA
Brisbane Broncos (U21s)	V	Dolphins (U21s)	Sunday, 9 August, 11:30am	Davies Park	TBA
Finals Series
Grand Final
1st Place	V	2nd Place	15/16 August	TBA	TBA

==== Grand Final ====
2026 NRLQ Series Grand Final

15/16 August 2026
TBA

1st Place	v	2nd Place

TBA

=== Mal Meninga Cup ===
2026 Mal Meninga Cup
- Duration: 14 February – 9/10 May 2026
- Teams: 14
- Broadcast partners: Streaming; QPlus TV (All Matches)

The Mal Meninga Cup is the Queensland Rugby League's statewide under 19s competition for male players, forming a key part of the QRL's junior pathways structure. It sits below the NRLQ Series and Queensland Cup, and above local junior competitions, providing a platform for elite under 19 talent from across Queensland and northern New South Wales.

==== Teams ====
The competition will feature the same 14 teams that competed in 2025. All 14 Australian based Queensland Cup sides field a team in this competition.

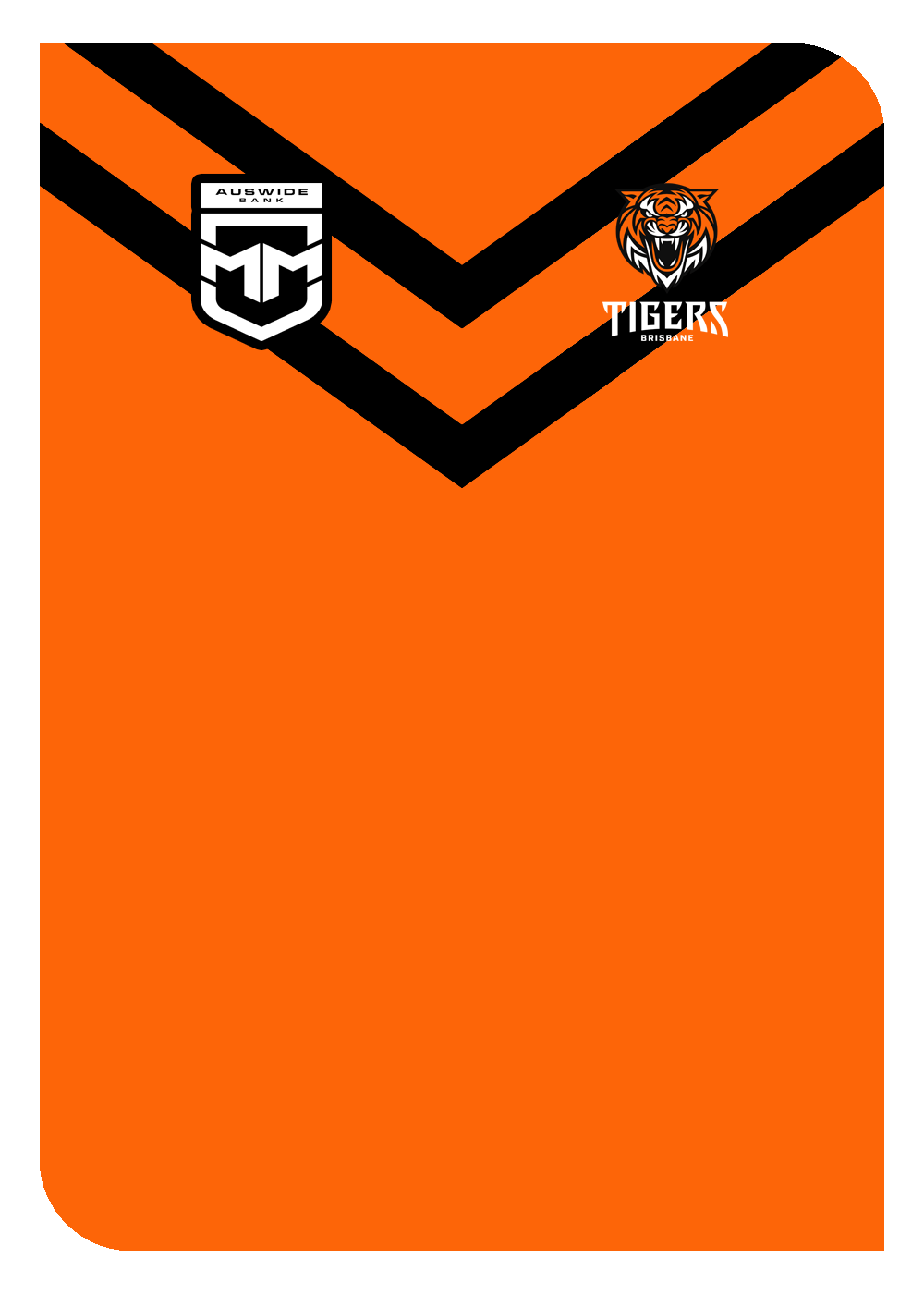
Brisbane Tigers Ground: Totally Workwear Stadium City/Suburb: Brisbane (Stones Corner) Coach: TBA Affiliate: Brisbane Tigers

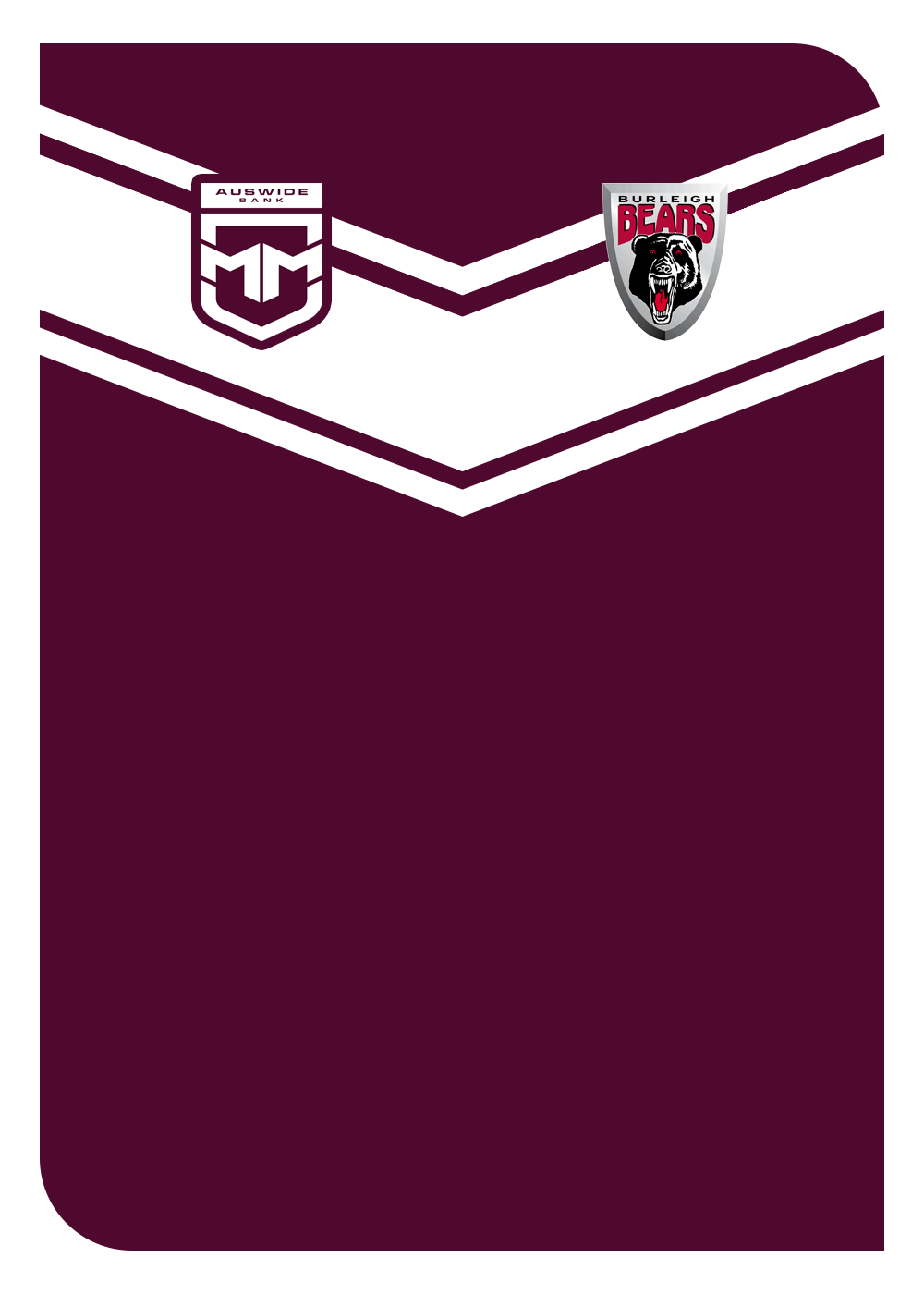
Burleigh Bears Ground: UAA Park City/Suburb: Gold Coast (Miami) Coach: TBA Affiliate: Burleigh Bears

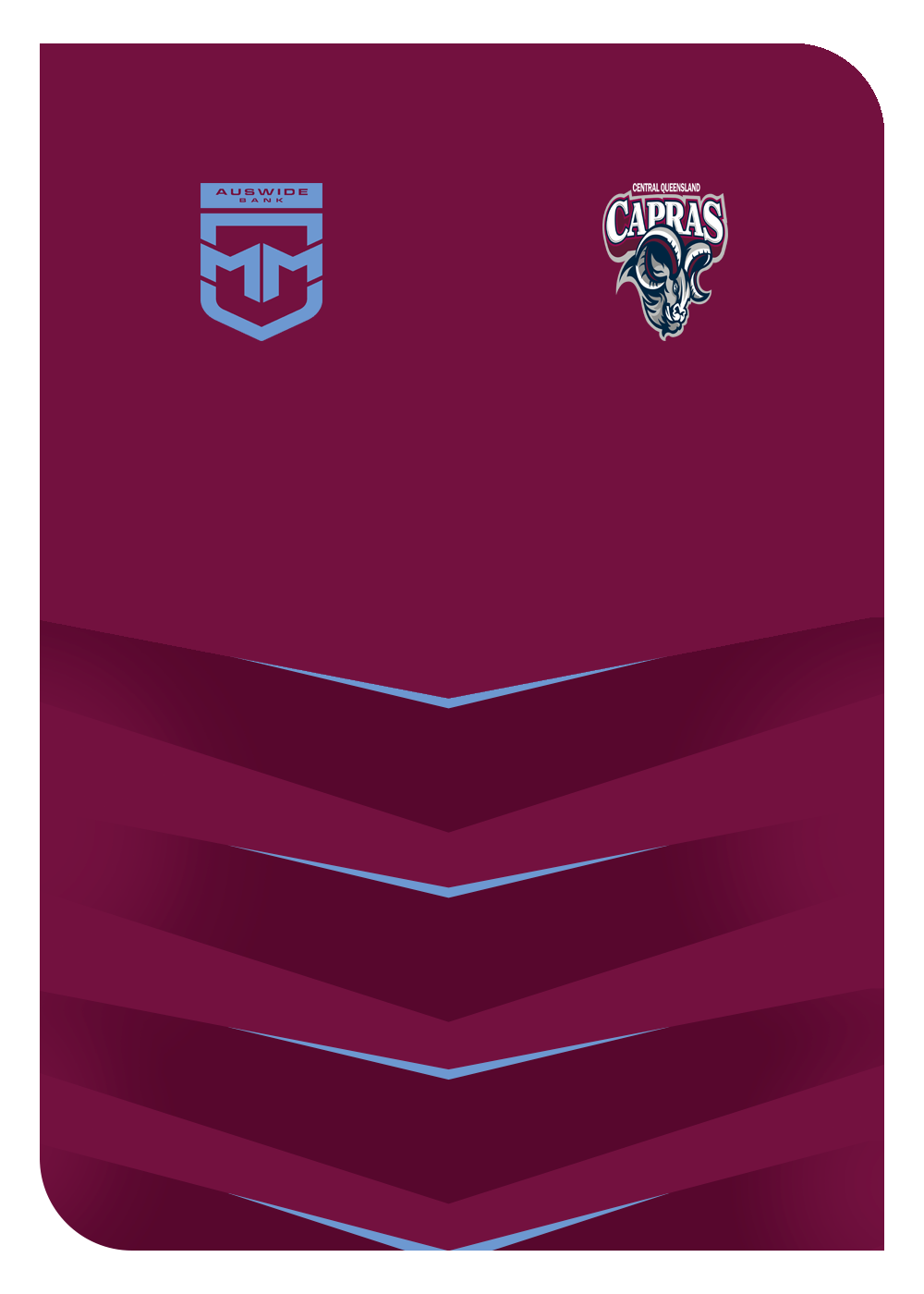
Central Queensland Capras Ground: Browne Park City/Suburb: Rockhampton (Wandal) Coach: TBA Affiliate: Central Queensland Capras

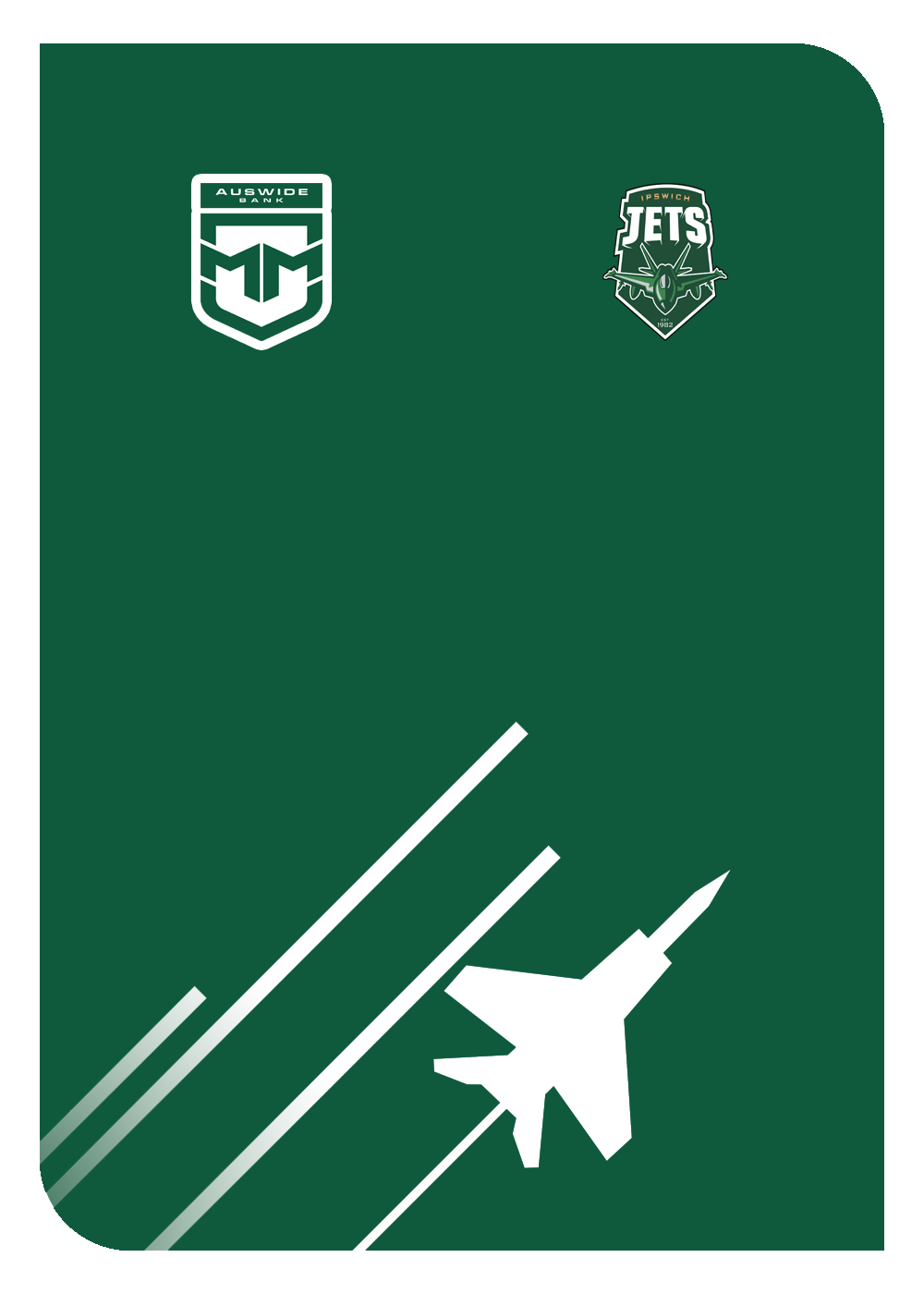
Ipswich Jets Ground: North Ipswich Reserve City/Suburb: Brisbane (Ipswich) Coach: TBA Affiliate: Ipswich Jets

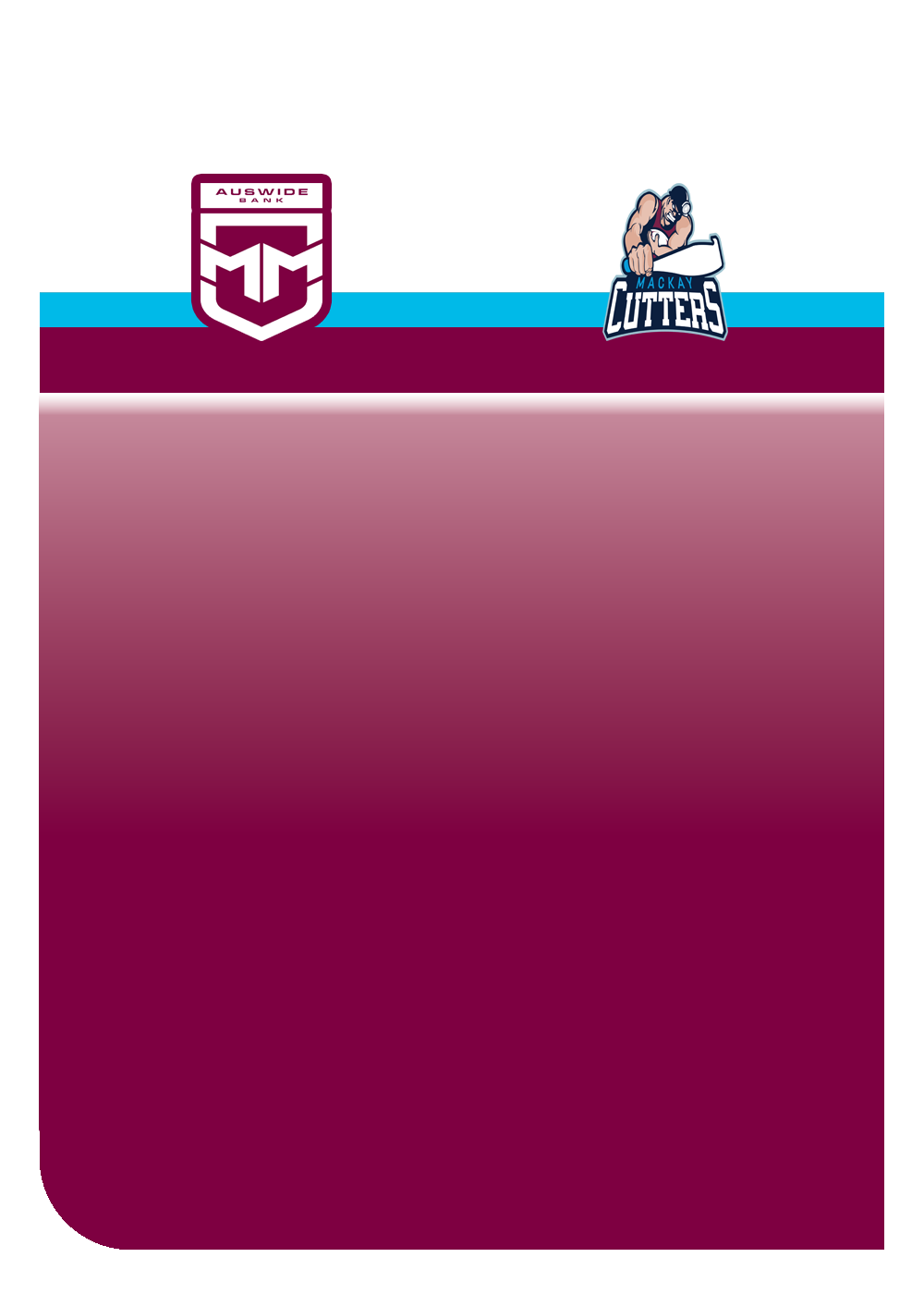
Mackay Cutters Ground: BB Print Stadium City/Suburb: Mackay (South Mackay) Coach: TBA Affiliate: Mackay Cutters

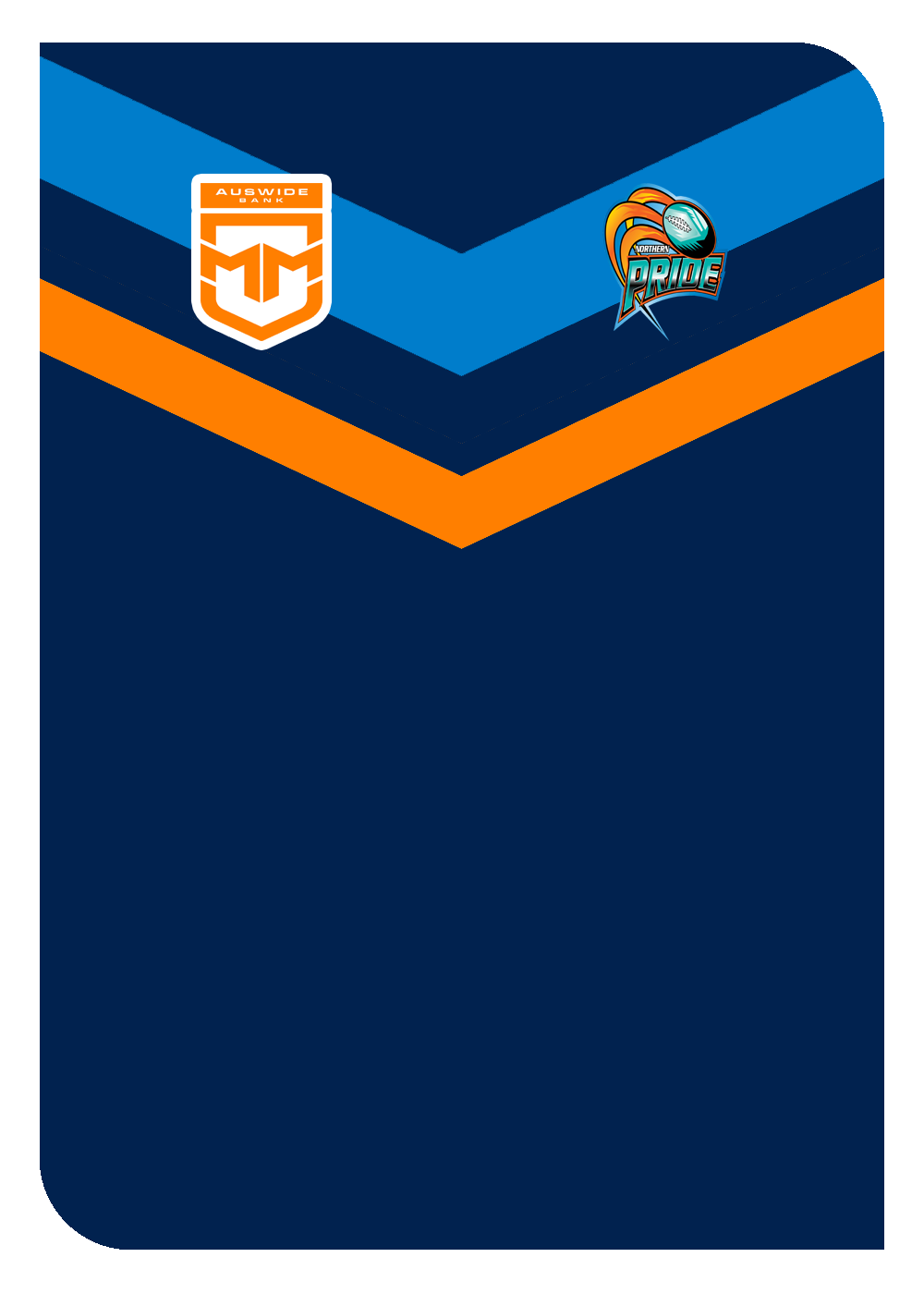
Northern Pride Ground: Barlow Park City/Suburb: Cairns (Parramatta Park) Coach: TBA Affiliate: Northern Pride

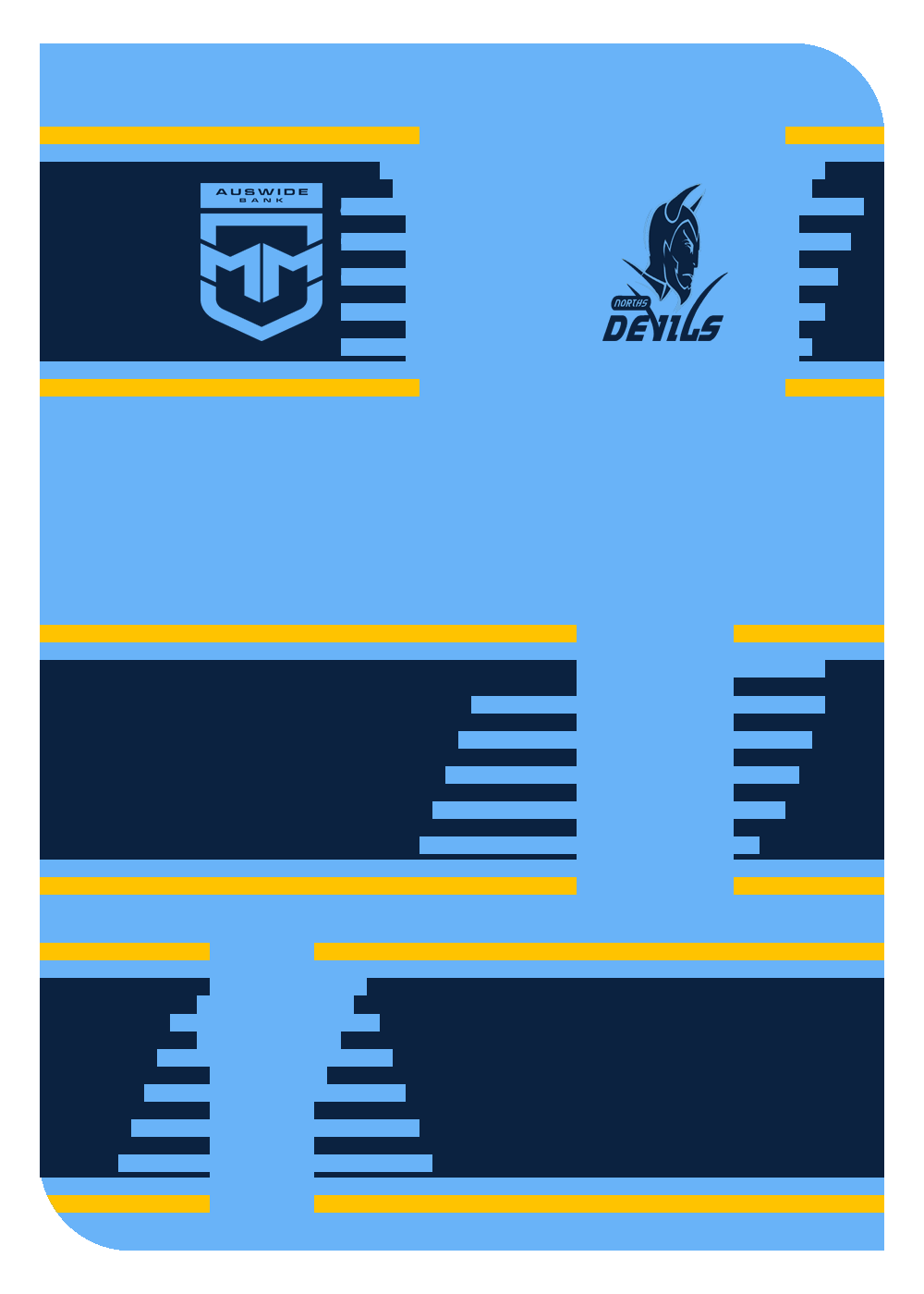
Norths Devils Ground: Premiers' Park City/Suburb: Brisbane (Nundah) Coach: TBA Affiliate: Norths Devils

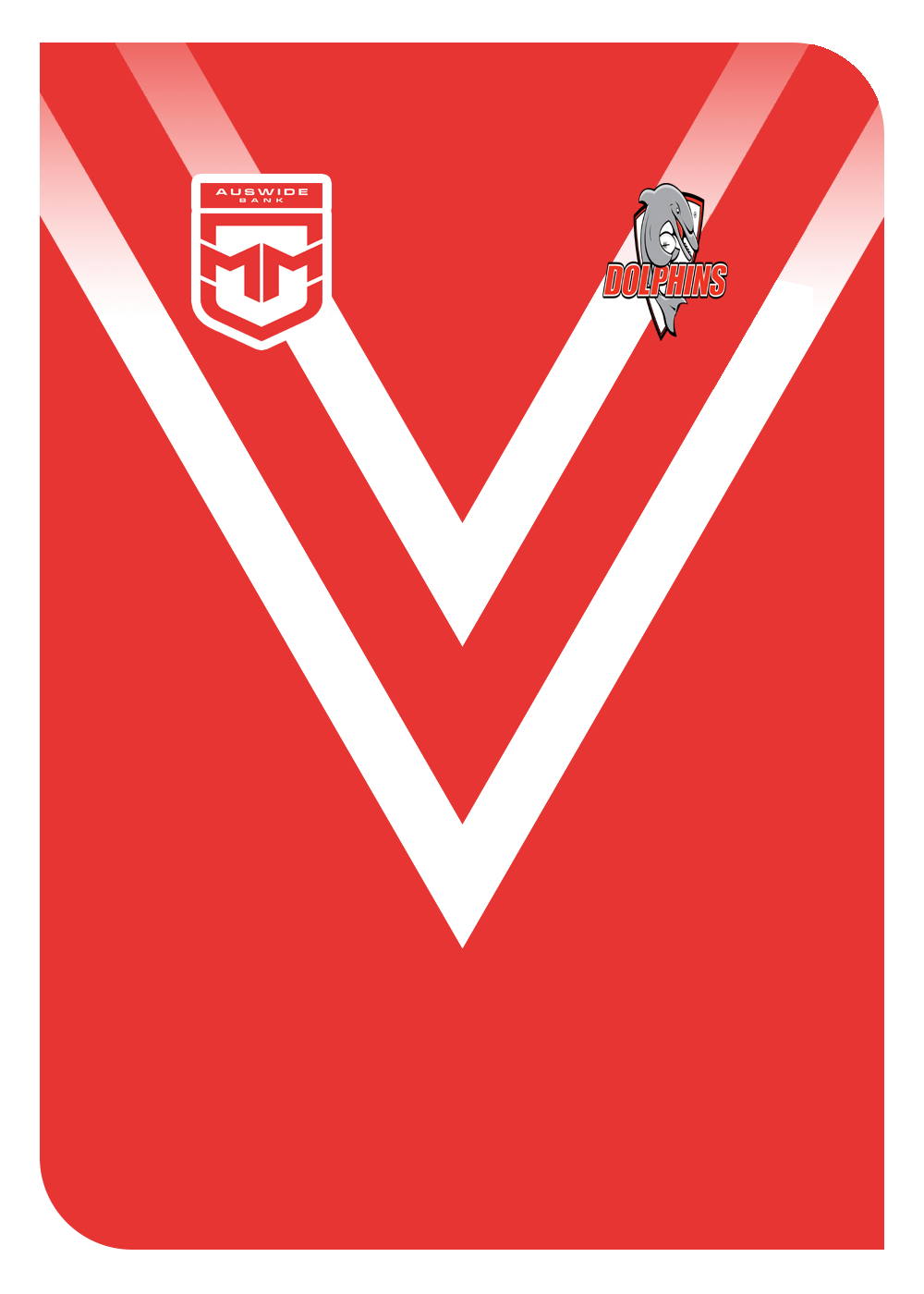
Redcliffe Dolphins Ground: Kayo Stadium City/Suburb: Brisbane (Redcliffe) Coach: TBA Affiliate: Redcliffe Dolphins

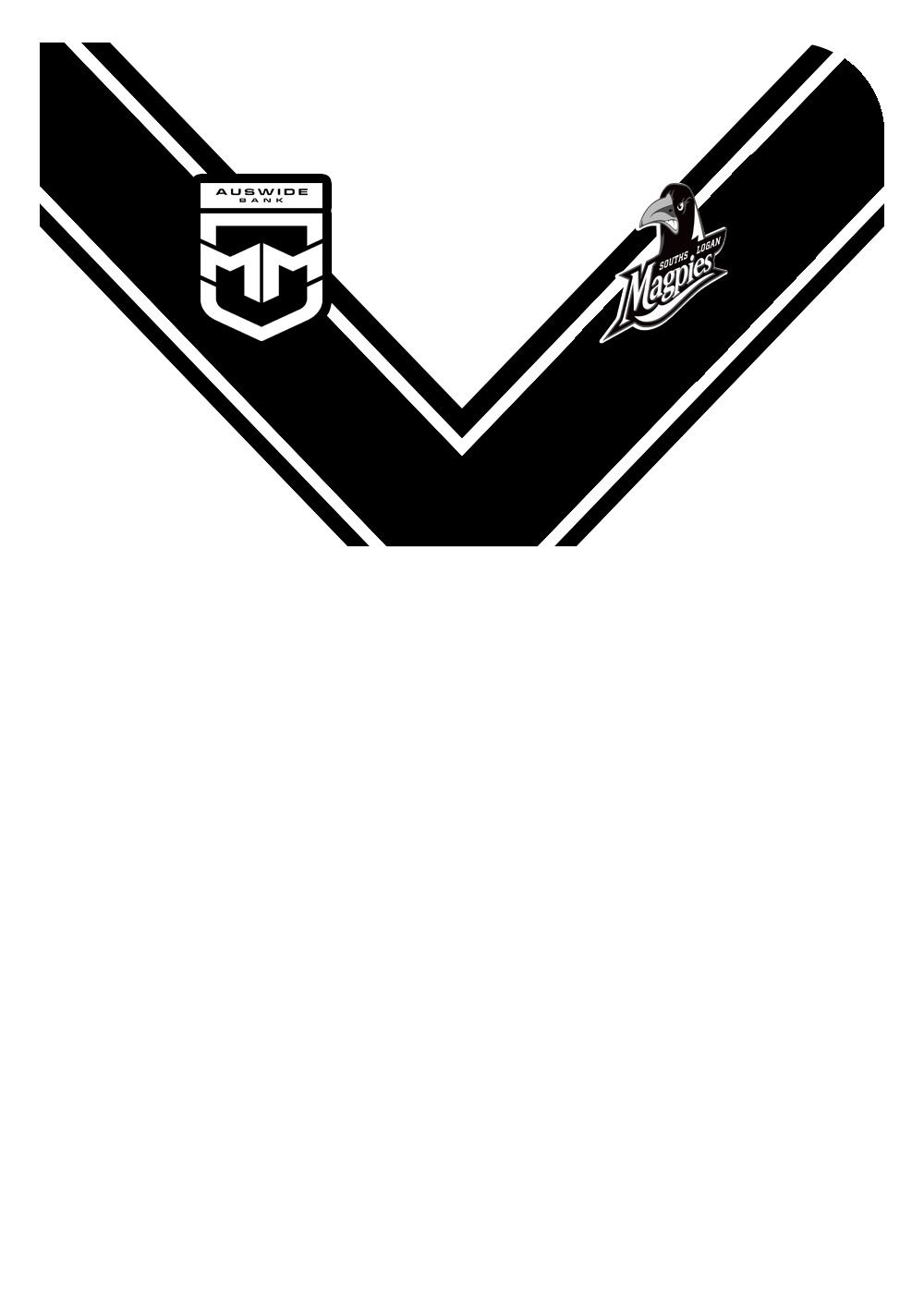
Souths Logan Magpies Ground: Davies Park City/Suburb: Brisbane (West End) Coach: TBA Affiliate: Souths Logan Magpies

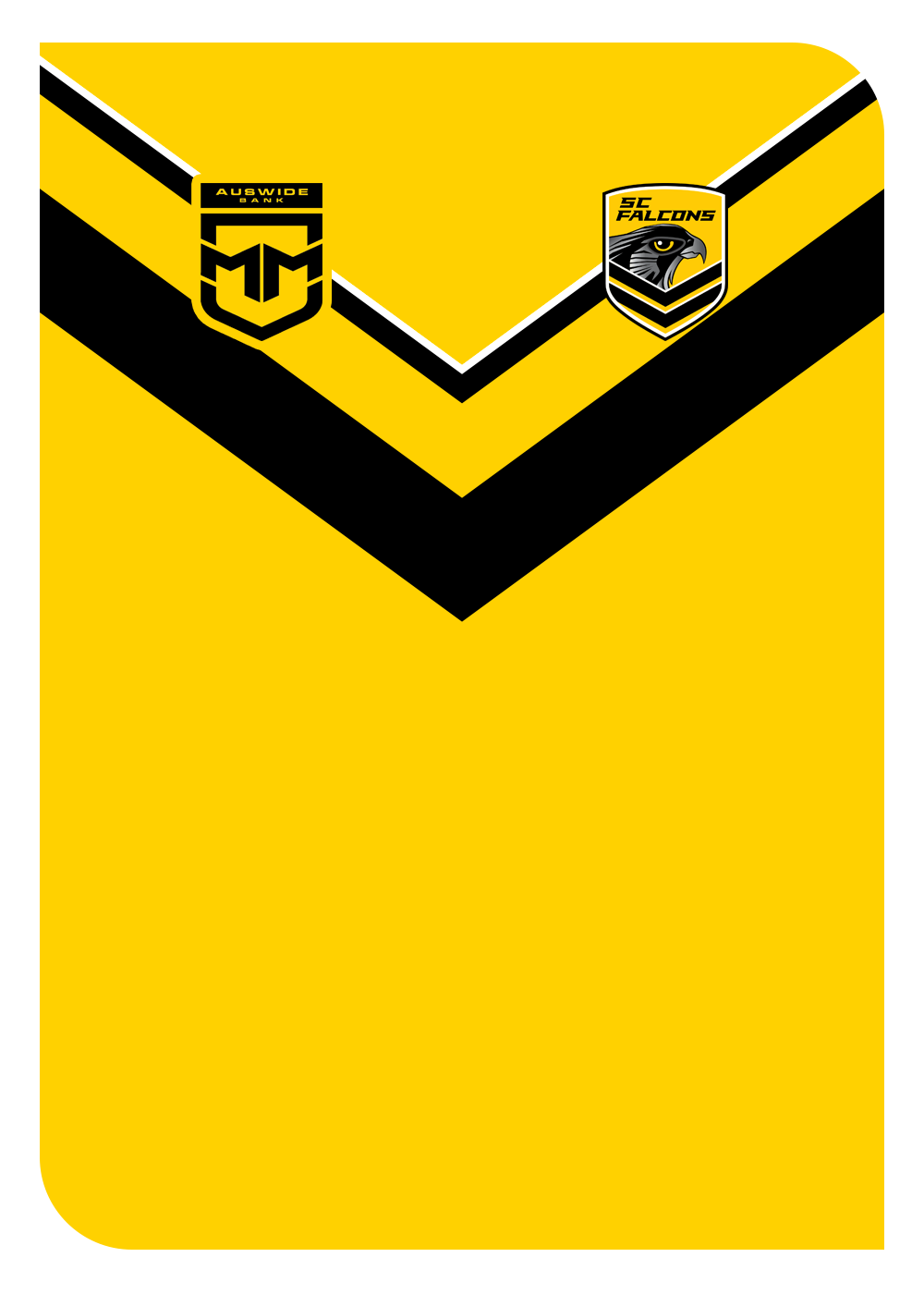
Sunshine Coast Falcons Ground: Sunshine Coast Stadium City/Suburb: Sunshine Coast (Bokarina) Coach: TBA Affiliate: Sunshine Coast Falcons

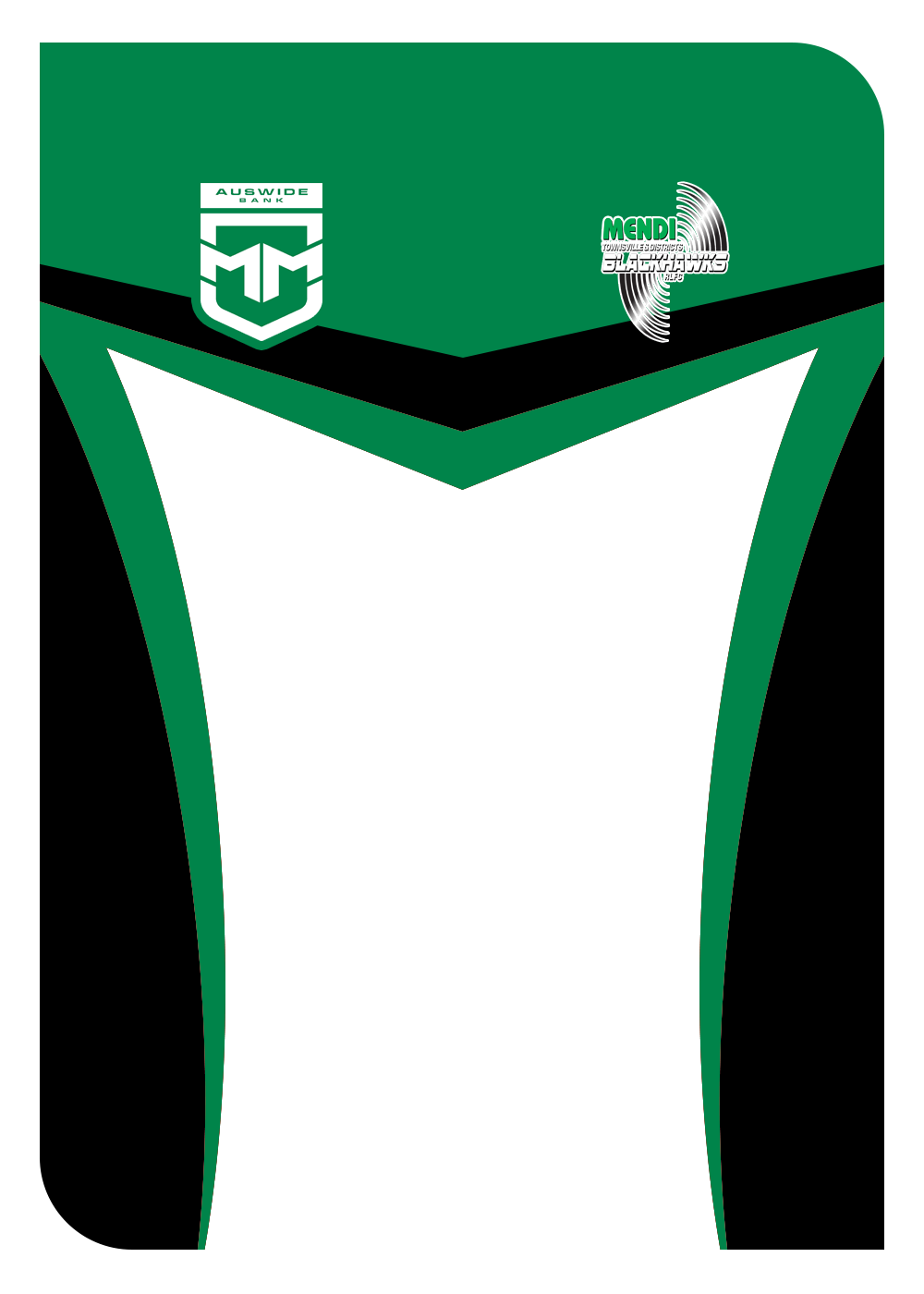
Townsville Blackhawks Ground: Jack Manski Oval City/Suburb: Townsville (Kirwan) Coach: TBA Affiliate: Townsville Blackhawks

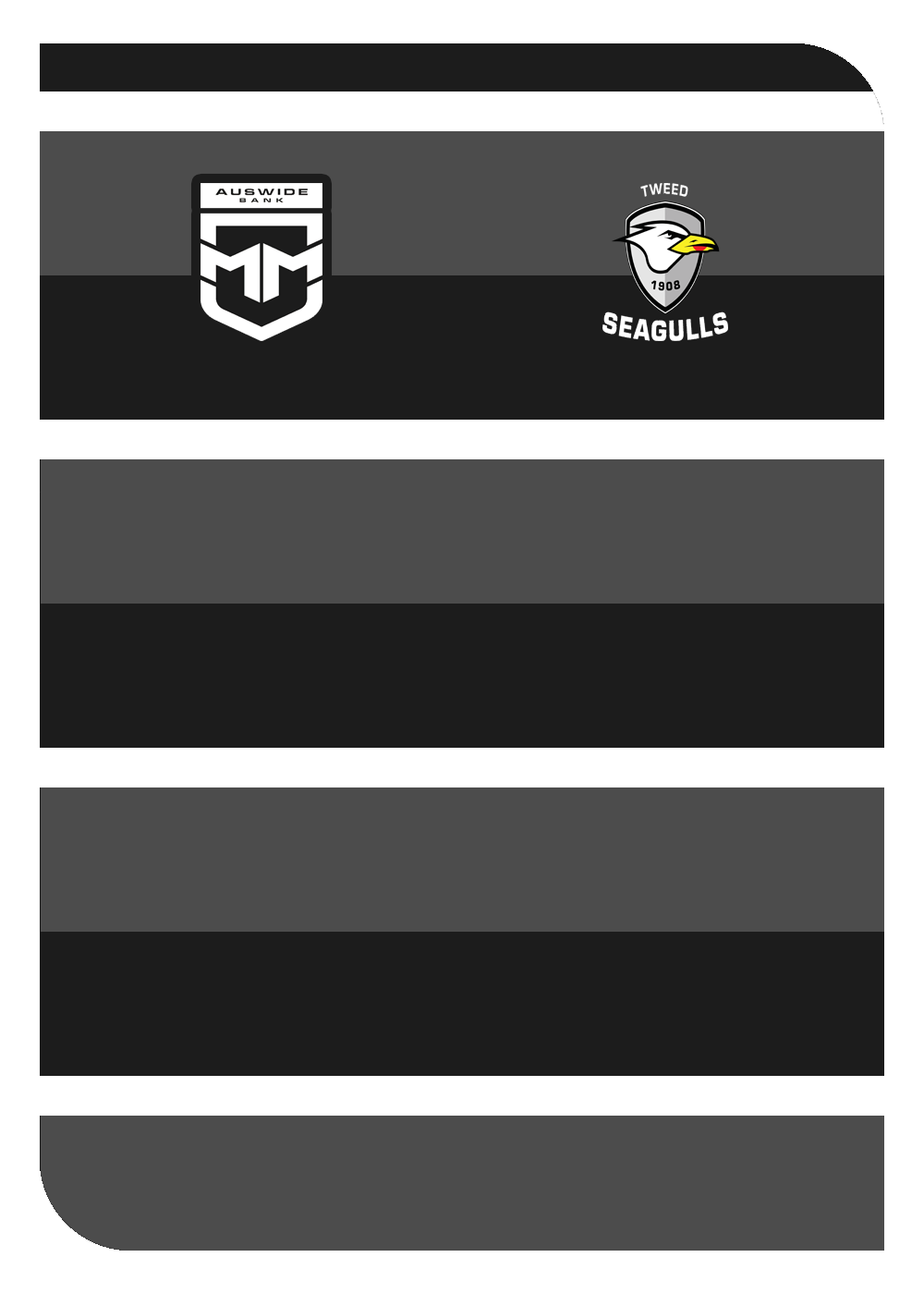
Tweed Heads Seagulls Ground: Preston Building Sports Complex City/Suburb: Tweed Heads (Tweed Heads West) Coach: TBA Affiliate: Tweed Heads Seagulls

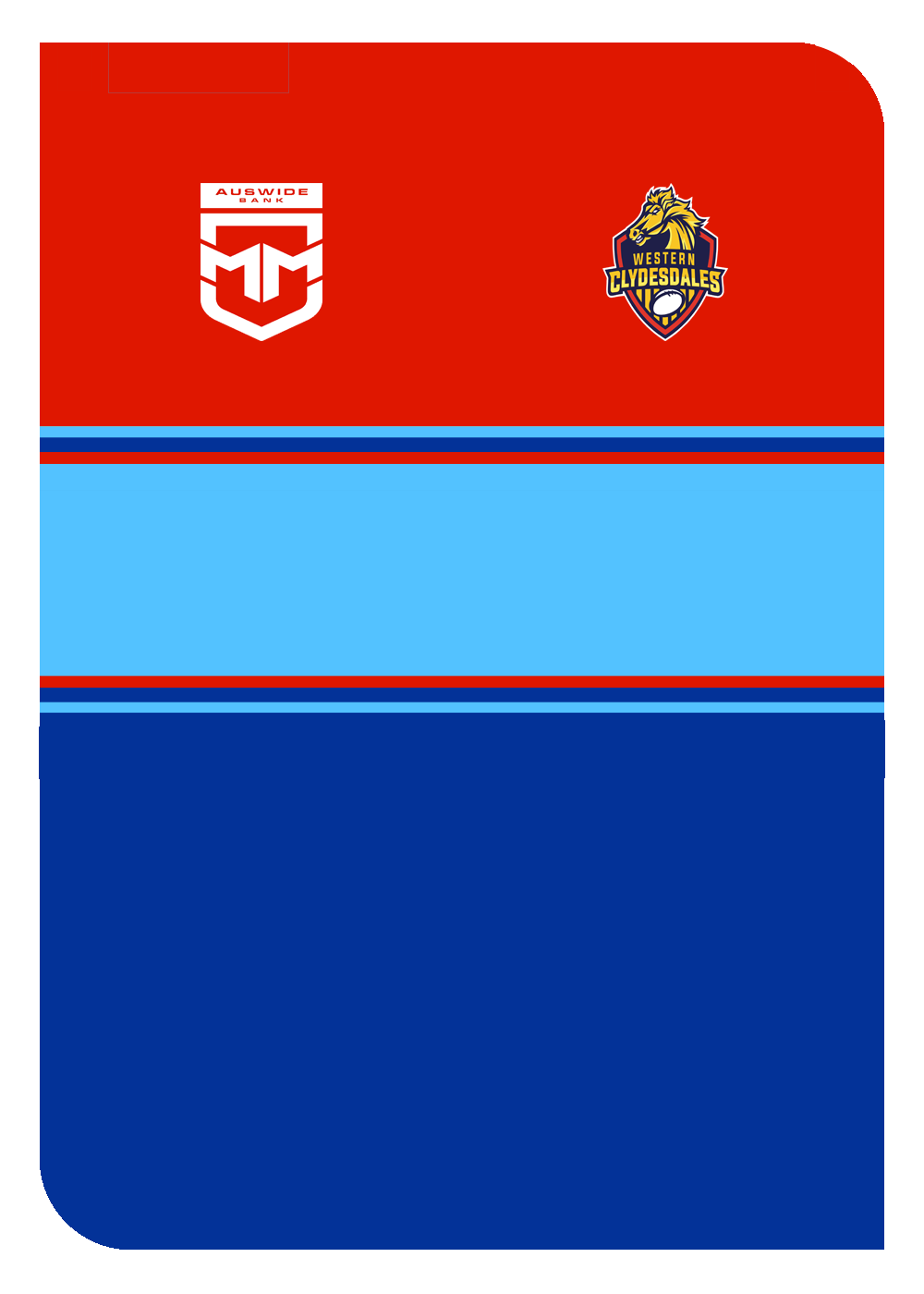
Western Clydesdales Ground: Toowoomba Sports Ground City/Suburb: Toowoomba (East Toowoomba) Coach: TBA Affiliate: Western Clydesdales

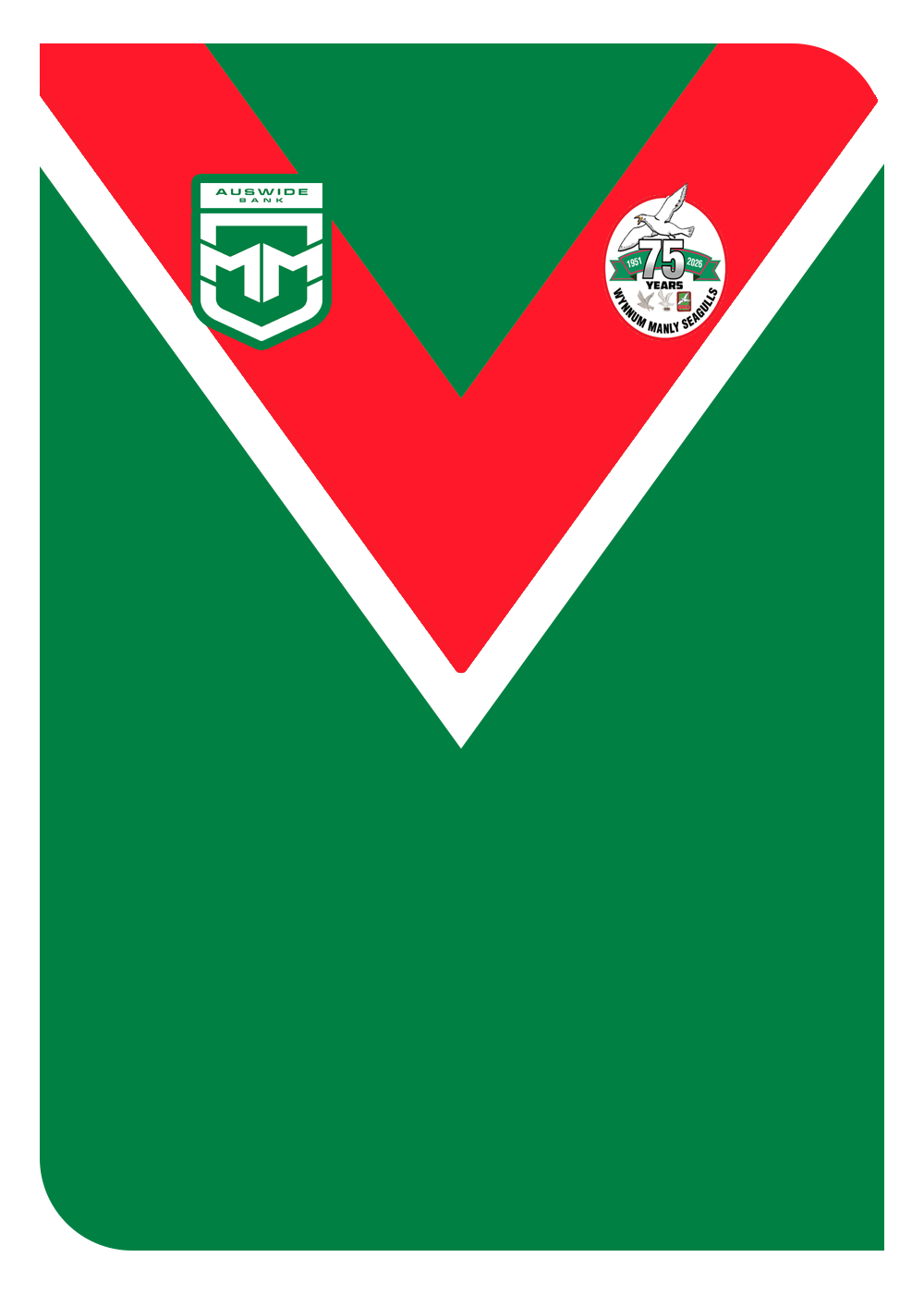
Wynnum Manly Seagulls Ground: BMD Kougari Oval City/Suburb: Brisbane (Manly West) Coach: TBA Affiliate: Wynnum Manly Seagulls

==== Ladder ====
Pos	Team	Pld	W	D	L	B	PF	PA	PD	Pts	Qualification
1	Wynnum Manly Seagulls (U19s)	7	6	0	1	0	186	126	+60	12	Minor Premiers & Semi-Finals
2	Townsville Blackhawks (U19s)	7	5	1	1	0	189	66	+123	11	Semi-Finals
3	Mackay Cutters (U19s)	7	5	1	1	0	178	100	+78	11	Elimination Finals
4	Ipswich Jets (U19s)	7	5	0	2	0	228	110	+118	10	Elimination Finals
5	Redcliffe Dolphins (U19s)	7	4	1	2	0	182	124	+58	9	Elimination Finals
6	Norths Devils (U19s)	7	4	0	3	0	220	168	+52	8	Elimination Finals
7	Tweed Heads Seagulls (U19s)	7	4	0	3	0	168	129	+39	8	
8	Burleigh Bears (U19s)	7	4	0	3	0	142	128	+14	8	
9	Souths Logan Magpies (U19s)	7	3	1	3	0	182	164	+18	7	
10	Western Clydesdales (U19s)	7	3	0	4	0	128	194	–66	6	
11	Brisbane Tigers (U19s)	7	2	0	5	0	134	156	–22	4	
12	Sunshine Coast Falcons (U19s)	7	2	0	5	0	98	274	-176	4	
13	Central Queensland Capras (U19s)	7	0	0	7	0	102	210	-108	0	
14	Northern Pride (U19s)	7	0	0	7	0	66	240	-174	0	

Updated to match(es) played on 1 September. Source:
Rules for classification: 1) points; 2) point difference; 3) points scored

===== Ladder progression =====
- Numbers highlighted in green indicate that the team finished the round inside the top 6.
- Numbers highlighted in blue indicates the team finished first on the ladder in that round.
- Numbers highlighted in red indicates the team finished last place on the ladder in that round.
- Underlined numbers indicate that the team had a bye during that round.

Pos	Team	2	3	4	5	6	7	1	8	9
1	Wynnum Manly Seagulls (U19s)	4	4	6	8	10	12	12		
2	Townsville Blackhawks (U19s)	3	5	7	7	9	11	11		
3	Mackay Cutters (U19s)	3	5	7	9	11	11	11		
4	Ipswich Jets (U19s)	2	4	4	6	8	10	10		
5	Redcliffe Dolphins (U19s)	4	5	7	7	7	9	9		
6	Norths Devils (U19s)	2	4	4	6	6	8	8		
7	Tweed Heads Seagulls (U19s)	2	2	4	6	6	6	8		
8	Burleigh Bears (U19s)	4	4	4	4	6	8	8		
9	Souths Logan Magpies (U19s)	2	3	3	5	7	7	7		
10	Western Clydesdales (U19s)	2	2	4	4	6	6	6		
11	Brisbane Tigers (U19s)	0	2	2	4	4	4	4		
12	Sunshine Coast Falcons (U19s)	2	2	2	2	2	4	4		
13	Central Queensland Capras (U19s)	0	0	0	0	0	0	0		
14	Northern Pride (U19s)	0	0	0	0	0	0	0		

Season Results:

Home	Score	Away	Match Information
Home	Score	Away	Date and Time	Venue	Referee	Video
Round 1
Ipswich Jets (U19s)	46 – 10	Northern Pride (U19s)	Saturday, 14 February, 2:40pm	Richardson Park	TBA
Burleigh Bears (U19s)	22 – 12	Central Queensland Capras (U19s)	Saturday, 14 February, 4:00pm	Betty Diamond Sports Complex	TBA
Mackay Cutters (U19s)	18 – 4	Western Clydesdales (U19s)	Saturday, 14 February, 6:00pm	Rugby League Mackay Grounds	TBA
Townsville Blackhawks (U19s)	32 – 6	Sunshine Coast Falcons (U19s)	Saturday, 14 February, 5:00pm	Jack Manski Oval	TBA
Redcliffe Dolphins (U19s)	20 – 10	Norths Devils (U19s)	Saturday, 14 February, 6:00pm	Kayo Stadium	TBA
Souths Logan Magpies (U19s)	16 – 26	Wynnum Manly Seagulls (U19s)	Sunday, 15 February, 1:00pm	Davies Park	TBA
Tweed Heads Seagulls (U19s)	26 – 12	Brisbane Tigers (U19s)	Thursday, 2 April, 7:00pm	Preston Building Sports Complex	TBA
Round 2
Brisbane Tigers (U19s)	12 – 34	Redcliffe Dolphins (U19s)	Saturday, 21 February, 11:00am	Totally Workwear Stadium	Sam Kalpakidis
Tweed Heads Seagulls (U19s)	26 – 22	Ipswich Jets (U19s)	Saturday, 21 February, 2:00pm	Preston Building Sports Complex	Henry Goddard
Burleigh Bears (U19s)	24 – 16	Souths Logan Magpies (U19s)	Saturday, 21 February, 4:00pm	UAA Park	Bayden Sawyers
Central Queensland Capras (U19s)	22 – 30	Western Clydesdales (U19s)	Saturday, 21 February, 6:00pm	Webb Park	Jacob Gregg
Norths Devils (U19s)	28 – 22	Wynnum Manly Seagulls (U19s)	Saturday, 21 February, 6:25pm	Premiers' Park	Cooper Lea
Sunshine Coast Falcons (U19s)	36 – 22	Northern Pride (U19s)	Sunday, 22 February, 3:00pm	Sunshine Coast Stadium	Fletcher Shearman
Townsville Blackhawks (U19s)	0 – 0*	Mackay Cutters (U19s)	N/A
Round 3
Wynnum Manly Seagulls (U19s)	30 – 10	Tweed Heads Seagulls (U19s)	Saturday, 8 February, 3:00pm	BMD Kougari Oval	TBA
Central Queensland Capras (U19s)	14 – 16	Mackay Cutters (U19s)	Saturday, 28 February, 3:00pm	Webb Park	Nicholas Bowyer
Brisbane Tigers (U19s)	22 – 0	Burleigh Bears (U19s)	Saturday, 28 February, 3:30pm	Totally Workwear Stadium	Fletcher Shearman
Sunshine Coast Falcons (U19s)	4 – 70	Norths Devils (U19s)	Saturday, 28 February, 4:00pm	Sunshine Coast Stadium	Hamish Kleijn
Northern Pride (U19s)	0 – 48	Townsville Blackhawks (U19s)	Saturday, 28 February, 5:30pm	Barlow Park	Jacob Gregg
Western Clydesdales (U19s)	6 – 42	Ipswich Jets (U19s)	Sunday, 1 March, 2:00pm	Toowoomba Sports Ground	Henry Goddard
Souths Logan Magpies (U19s)	22 – 22	Redcliffe Dolphins (U19s)	Sunday, 1 March, 3:00pm	Davies Park	Sam Kalpakidis
Round 4
Souths Logan Magpies (U19s)	24 – 20	Brisbane Tigers (U19s)	Saturday, 7 February, 2:30pm	Totally Workwear Stadium	TBA
Wynnum Manly Seagulls (U19s)	30 – 6	Central Queensland Capras (U19s)	Saturday, 7 March, 1:30pm	BMD Kougari Oval	Jacob Gregg
Norths Devils (U19s)	4 – 38	Tweed Heads Seagulls (U19s)	Saturday, 7 March, 4:15pm	Premiers' Park	Henry Goddard
Mackay Cutters (U19s)	42 – 6	Sunshine Coast Falcons (U19s)	Saturday, 7 March, 6:00pm	BB Print Stadium	Nicholas Bowyer
Western Clydesdales (U19s)	16 – 12	Northern Pride (U19s)	Sunday, 8 March, 9:50am	Toowoomba Sports Ground	Bayden Sawyers
Ipswich Jets (U19s)	6 – 44	Townsville Blackhawks (U19s)	Sunday, 8 March, 1:00pm	Richardson Park	Hamish Kleijn
Redcliffe Dolphins (U19s)	30 – 10	Burleigh Bears (U19s)	Sunday, 8 March, 3:00pm	Kayo Stadium	Sam Kalpakidis
Round 5
Tweed Heads Seagulls (U19s)	32 – 16	Redcliffe Dolphins (U19s)	Saturday, 14 March, 2:00pm	Preston Building Sports Complex	Jack Thornton
Burleigh Bears (U19s)	22 – 24	Wynnum Manly Seagulls (U19s)	Saturday, 14 March, 3:00pm	UAA Park	Hamish Kleijn
Mackay Cutters (U19s)	32 – 16	Townsville Blackhawks (U19s)	Saturday, 14 March, 4:00pm	BB Print Stadium	Nicholas Bowyer
Northern Pride (U19s)	12 – 26	Brisbane Tigers (U19s)	Saturday, 14 March, 4:00pm	Barlow Park	Henry Goddard
Western Clydesdales (U19s)	14 – 42	Norths Devils (U19s)	Sunday, 15 March, 12:30pm	Toowoomba Sports Ground	Sam Kalpakidis
Ipswich Jets (U19s)	58 – 4	Sunshine Coast Falcons (U19s)	Sunday, 15 March, 1:00pm	Richardson Park	TBA
Souths Logan Magpies (U19s)	42 – 12	Central Queensland Capras (U19s)	Sunday, 15 March, 1:30pm	Davies Park	Ethan Brown
Round 6
Tweed Heads Seagulls (U19s)	14 – 20	Burleigh Bears (U19s)	Saturday, 21 March, 2:00pm	Preston Building Sports Complex	Jacob Gregg
Mackay Cutters (U19s)	38 – 24	Central Queensland Capras (U19s)	Saturday, 21 March, 4:00pm	BB Print Stadium	Nicholas Bowyer
Townsville Blackhawks (U19s)	24 – 0	Northern Pride (U19s)	Saturday, 21 March, 5:00pm	Jack Manski Oval	Nic Jones
Ipswich Jets (U19s)	18 – 10	Brisbane Tigers (U19s)	Sunday, 22 March, 1:00pm	Richardson Park	Henry Goddard
Wynnum Manly Seagulls (U19s)	18 – 12	Redcliffe Dolphins (U19s)	Sunday, 22 March, 1:20pm	BMD Kougari Oval	Sam Kalpakidis
Western Clydesdales (U19s)	38 – 10	Sunshine Coast Falcons (U19s)	Sunday, 22 March, 2:30pm	Toowoomba Sports Ground	Fletcher Shearman
Norths Devils (U19s)	24 – 52	Souths Logan Magpies (U19s)	Sunday, 22 March, 4:15pm	Premiers' Park	Hamish Kleijn
Round 7
Brisbane Tigers (U19s)	32 – 42	Norths Devils (U19s)	Saturday, 28 March, 1:00pm	Totally Workwear Stadium	Henry Goddard
Sunshine Coast Falcons (U19s)	32 – 12	Central Queensland Capras (U19s)	Saturday, 28 March, 3:30pm	Sunshine Coast Stadium	Jacob Gregg
Redcliffe Dolphins (U19s)	48 – 20	Western Clydesdales (U19s)	Saturday, 28 March, 4:30pm	Kayo Stadium	Ethan Brown
Burleigh Bears (U19s)	44 – 10	Northern Pride (U19s)	Saturday, 28 March, 6:45pm	UAA Park	Jack Thornton
Souths Logan Magpies (U19s)	10 – 36	Ipswich Jets (U19s)	Sunday, 29 March, 12:20pm	Davies Park	Hamish Kleijn
Townsville Blackhawks (U19s)	25 – 22	Tweed Heads Seagulls (U19s)	Sunday, 29 March, 12:30pm	Jack Manski Oval	Nicholas Bowyer
Wynnum Manly Seagulls (U19s)	36 – 32	Mackay Cutters (U19s)	Sunday, 29 March, 1:30pm	BMD Kougari Oval	Sam Kalpakidis
Round 8
Brisbane Tigers (U19s)	V	Western Clydesdales (U19s)	Saturday, 11 April, 12:30pm	Totally Workwear Stadium	TBA
Ipswich Jets (U19s)	V	Burleigh Bears (U19s)	Saturday, 11 April, 1:00pm	Richardson Park	TBA
Northern Pride (U19s)	V	Mackay Cutters (U19s)	Saturday, 11 April, 1:20pm	Barlow Park	TBA
Norths Devils (U19s)	V	Central Queensland Capras (U19s)	Saturday, 11 April, 3:20pm	Premiers' Park	TBA
Townsville Blackhawks (U19s)	V	Wynnum Manly Seagulls (U19s)	Saturday, 11 April, 3:30pm	Jack Manski Oval	TBA
Sunshine Coast Falcons (U19s)	V	Redcliffe Dolphins (U19s)	Saturday, 11 April, 3:30pm	Sunshine Coast Stadium	TBA
Tweed Heads Seagulls (U19s)	V	Souths Logan Magpies (U19s)	Saturday, 11 April, 5:00pm	Preston Building Sports Complex	TBA
Round 9
Brisbane Tigers (U19s)	V	Wynnum Manly Seagulls (U19s)	Saturday, 18 April, 12:30pm	Totally Workwear Stadium	TBA
Burleigh Bears (U19s)	V	Norths Devils (U19s)	Saturday, 18 April, 1:15pm	UAA Park	TBA
Northern Pride (U19s)	V	Sunshine Coast Falcons (U19s)	Saturday, 18 April, 1:20pm	Barlow Park	TBA
Townsville Blackhawks (U19s)	V	Central Queensland Capras (U19s)	Saturday, 18 April, 3:30pm	Jack Manski Oval	TBA
Mackay Cutters (U19s)	V	Tweed Heads Seagulls (U19s)	Saturday, 18 April, 4:00pm	BB Print Stadium	TBA
Redcliffe Dolphins (U19s)	V	Ipswich Jets (U19s)	Saturday, 18 April, 5:00pm	Kayo Stadium	TBA
Western Clydesdales (U19s)	V	Souths Logan Magpies (U19s)	Sunday, 19 April, 12:30pm	Toowoomba Sports Ground	TBA
Finals Series
Elimination Finals
3rd Place	V	6th Place	25/26 April	TBA	TBA
4th Place	V	5th Place	25/26 April	TBA	TBA
Semi-Finals
1st Place	V	Lowest Ranked EF Winner	2/3 May	TBA	TBA
2nd Place	V	Highest Ranked EF Winner	2/3 May	TBA	TBA
Grand Final
PF1 Winner	V	PF2 Winner	9/10 May	TBA	TBA

==== Grand Final ====
Elimination Finals
4
5
3
6

Semi-Finals
1
4/5/6
2
3/4/5

Grand Final

2026 Mal Meninga Cup Grand Final

9/10 May 2026
TBA

PF1 Winner	v	PF2 Winner

TBA

=== Under 19s Women's ===
The QRL Under 19s Women's Premiership (Named the Harvey Norman Under 19s for sponsorship reasons) is the Queensland Rugby League's statewide under 19s competition for female players and a key step in the QRL’s female pathways structure. It sits between the Harvey Norman Under 17s and the senior Queensland Women's Premiership, providing a platform for elite under 19s talent from across Queensland and northern New South Wales.

2026 QRL Under 19s Women's Premiership
- Duration: 14 February – 11/12 April 2026
- Teams: 14
- Broadcast partners: Streaming; QPlus TV (All Matches)

==== Teams ====
The competition will feature the same 14 teams that competed in 2025. All 14 Australian based Queensland Cup sides field a team in this competition.

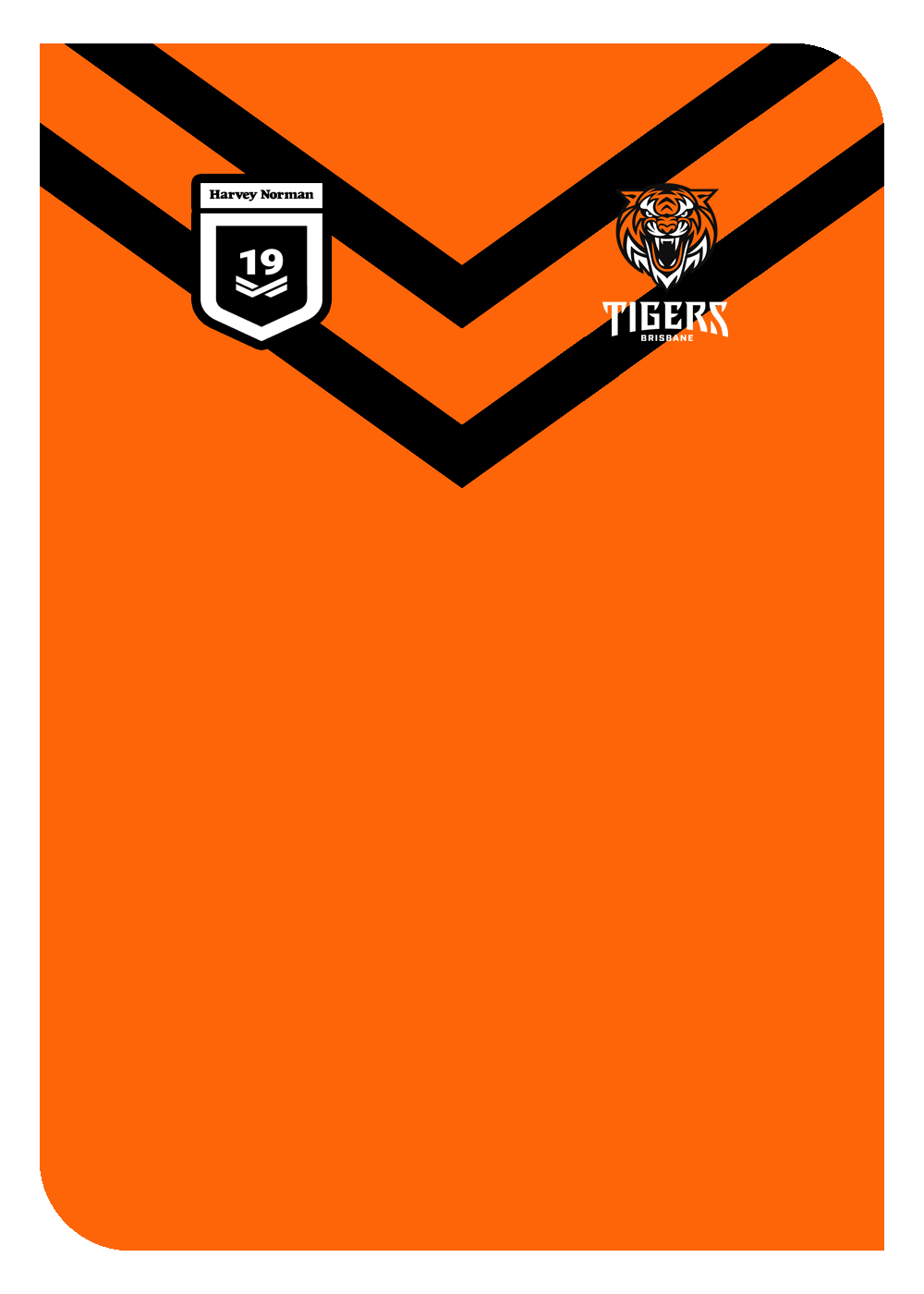
Brisbane Tigers Ground: Totally Workwear Stadium City/Suburb: Brisbane (Stones Corner) Coach: TBA Affiliate: Brisbane Tigers

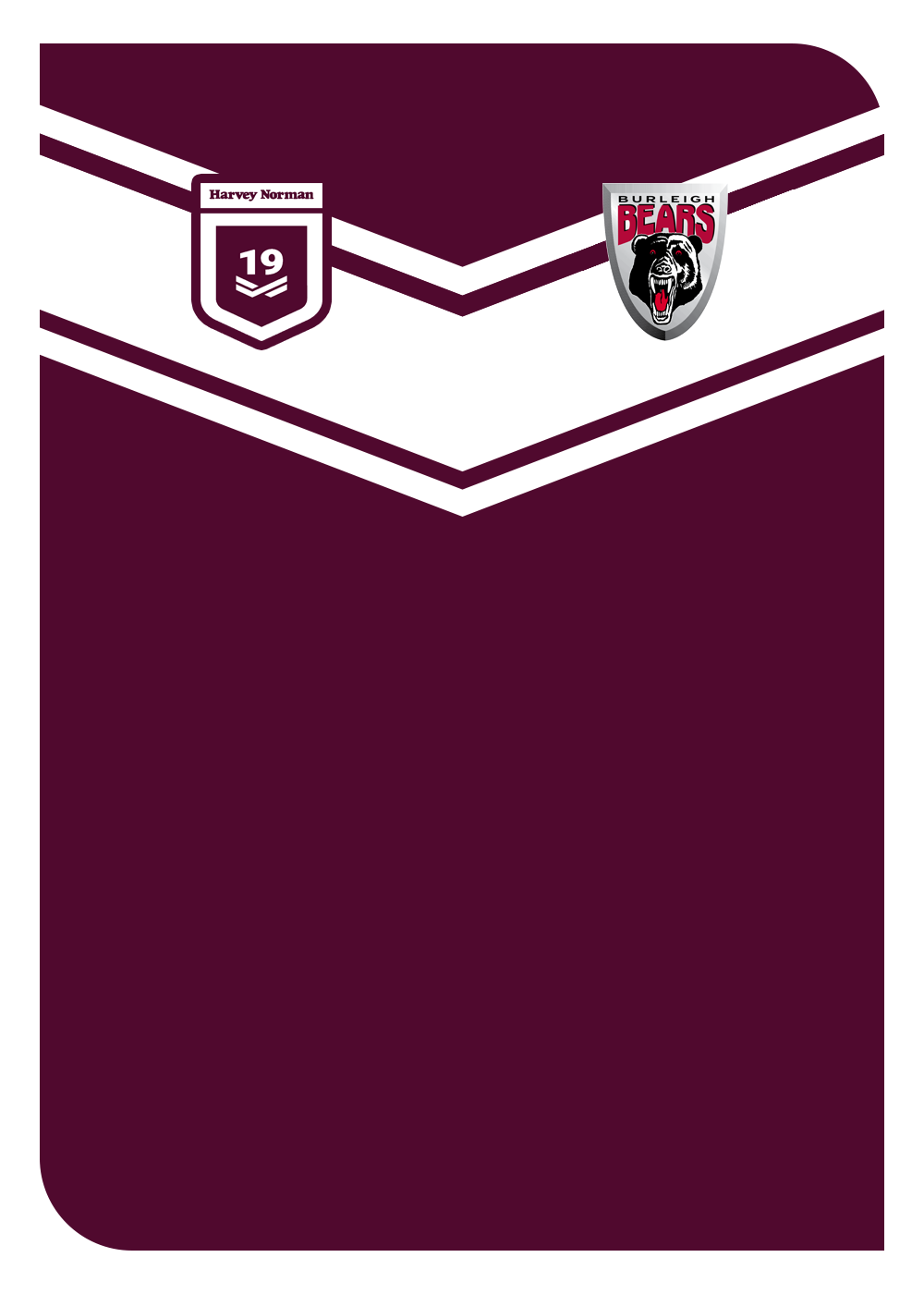
Burleigh Bears Ground: UAA Park City/Suburb: Gold Coast (Miami) Coach: TBA Affiliate: Burleigh Bears

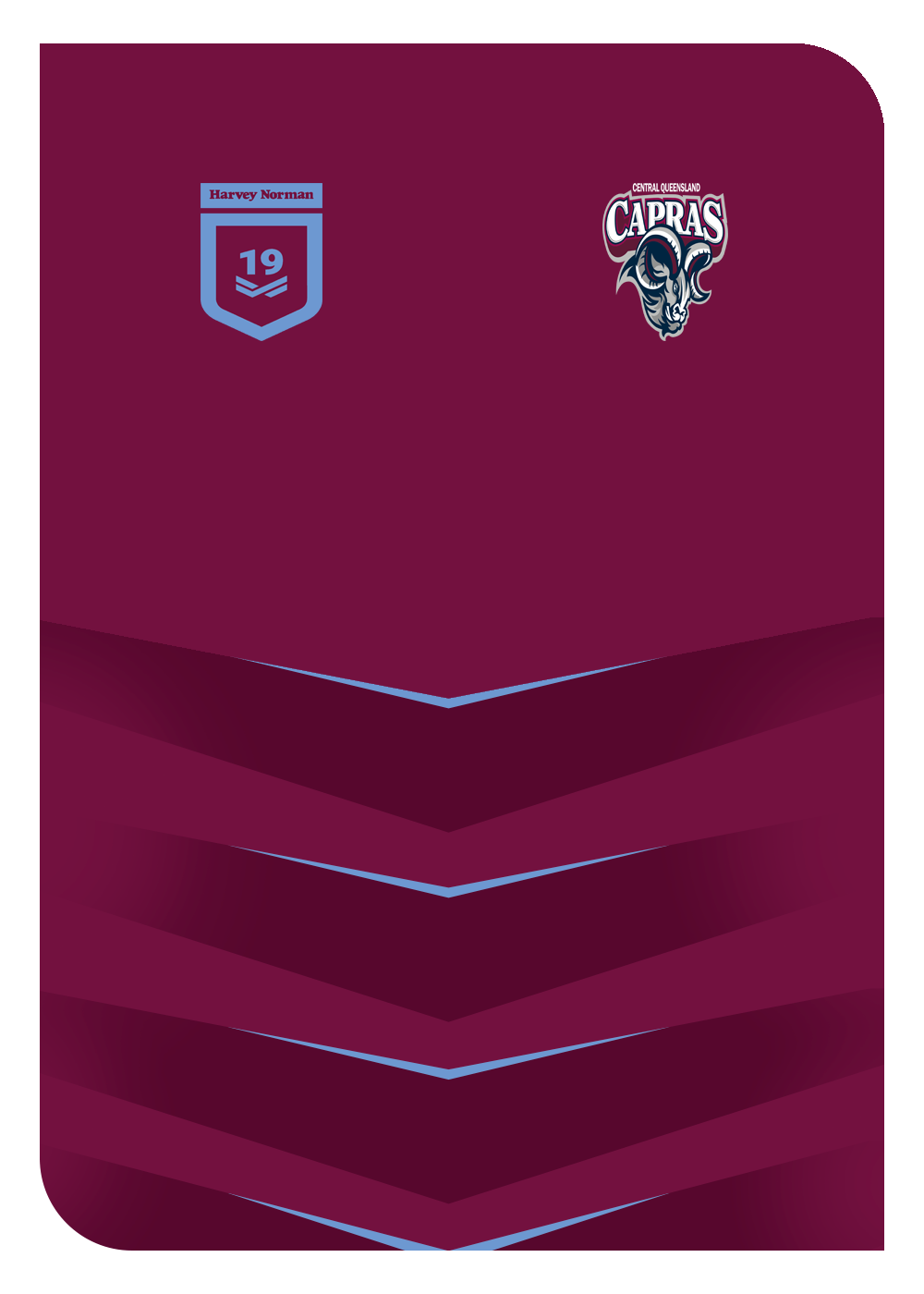
Central Queensland Capras Ground: Browne Park City/Suburb: Rockhampton (Wandal) Coach: TBA Affiliate: Central Queensland Capras

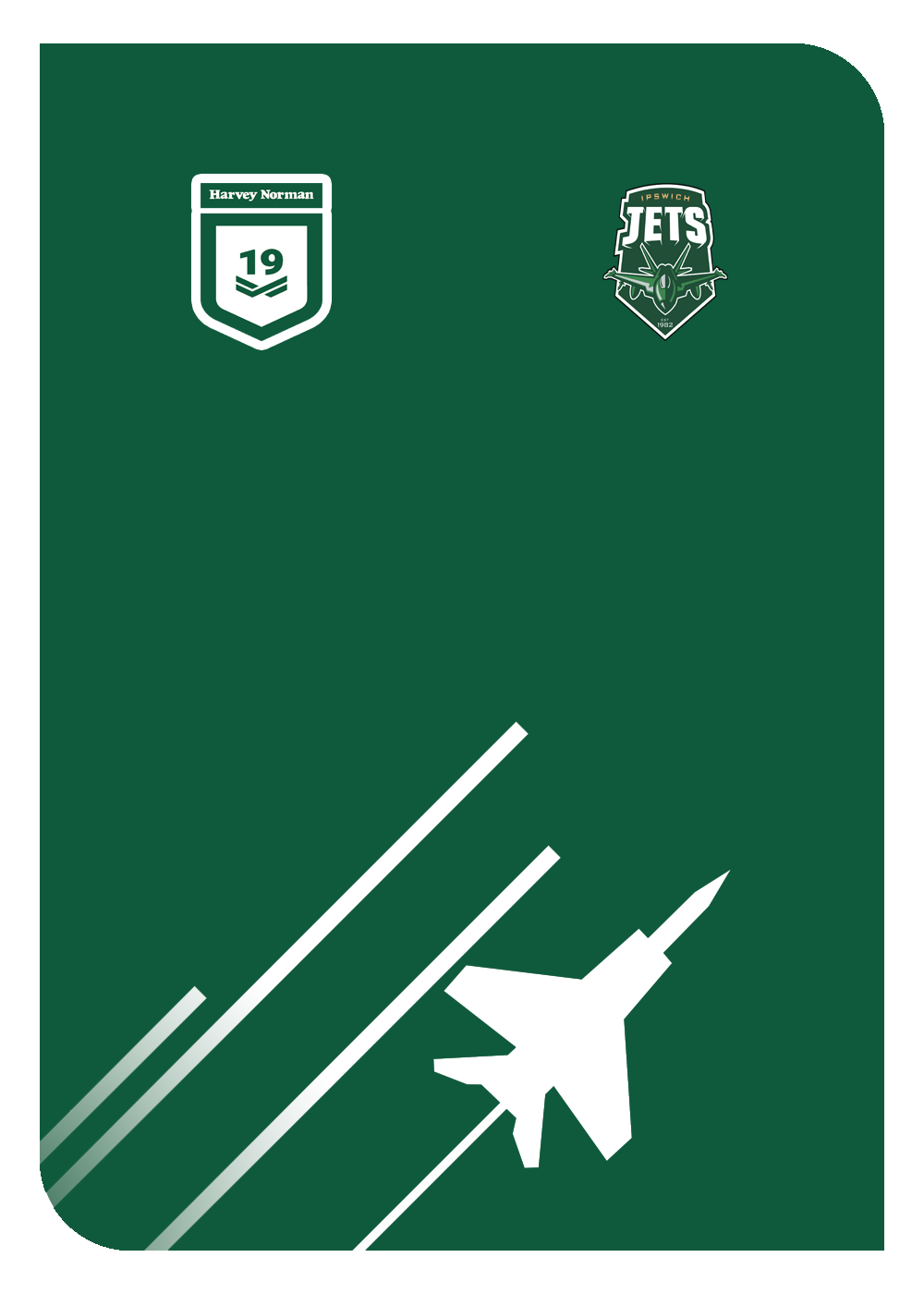
Ipswich Jets Ground: North Ipswich Reserve City/Suburb: Brisbane (Ipswich) Coach: TBA Affiliate: Ipswich Jets

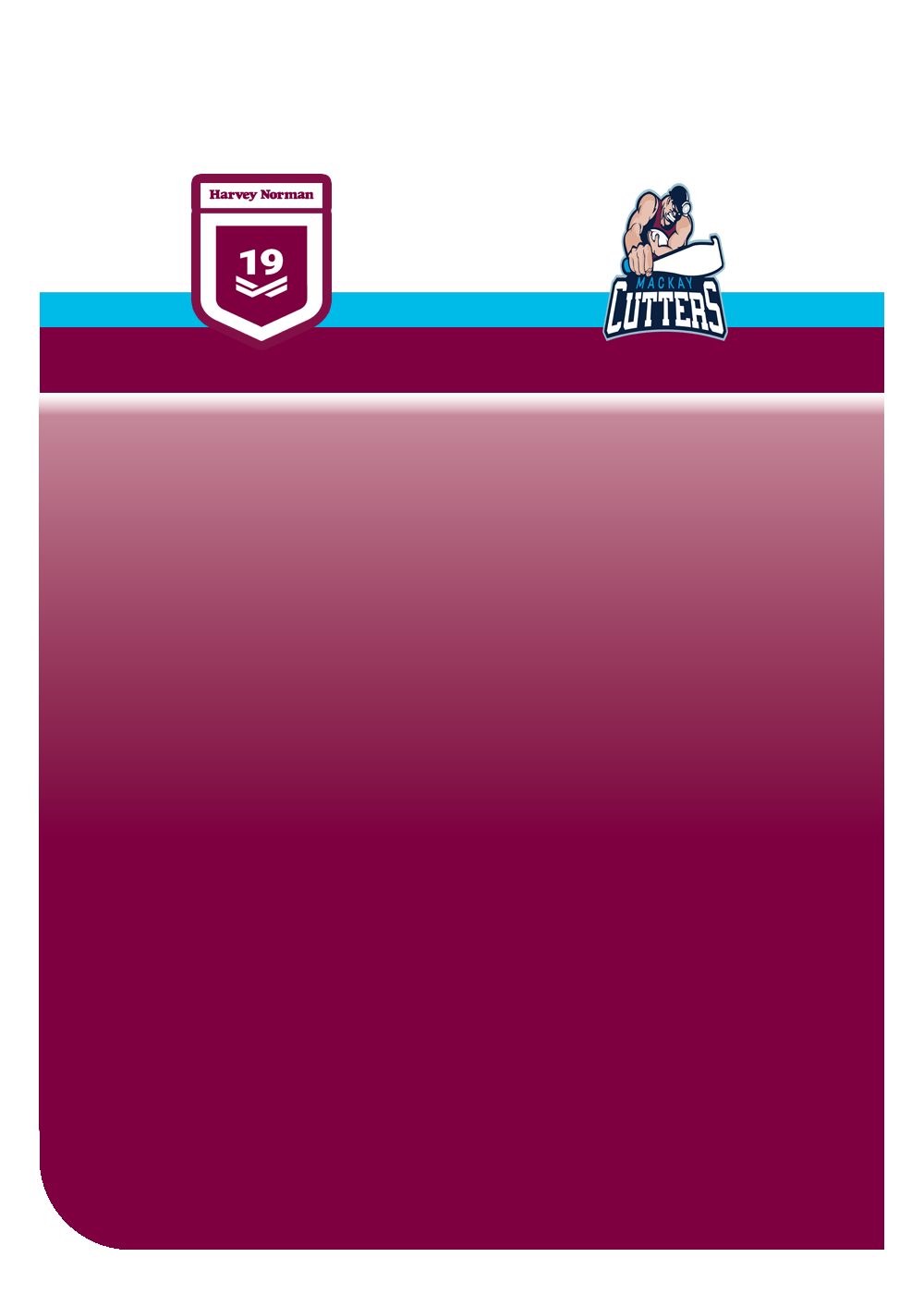
Mackay Cutters Ground: BB Print Stadium City/Suburb: Mackay (South Mackay) Coach: TBA Affiliate: Mackay Cutters

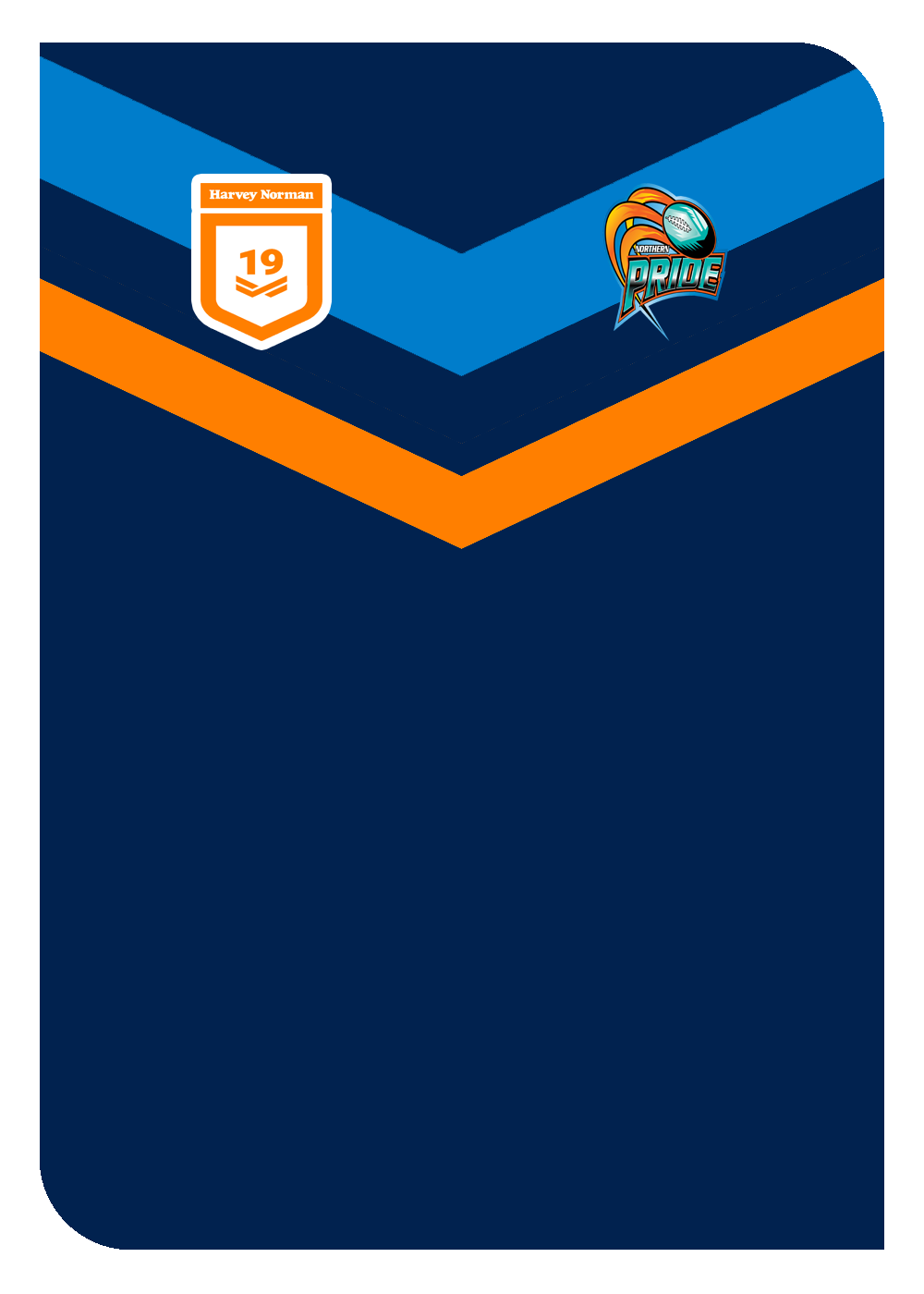
Northern Pride Ground: Barlow Park City/Suburb: Cairns (Parramatta Park) Coach: TBA Affiliate: Northern Pride

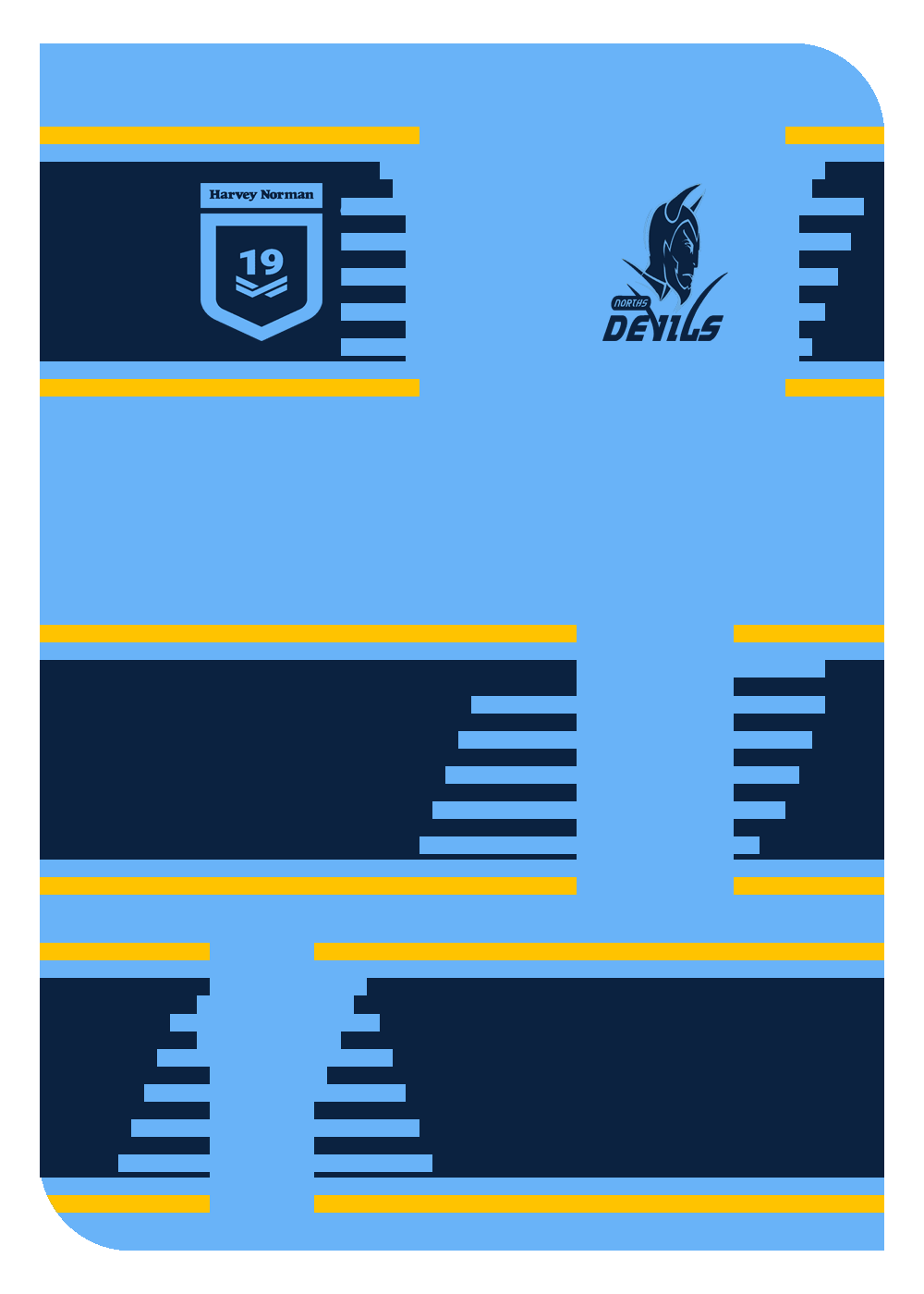
Norths Devils Ground: Premiers' Park City/Suburb: Brisbane (Nundah) Coach: TBA Affiliate: Norths Devils

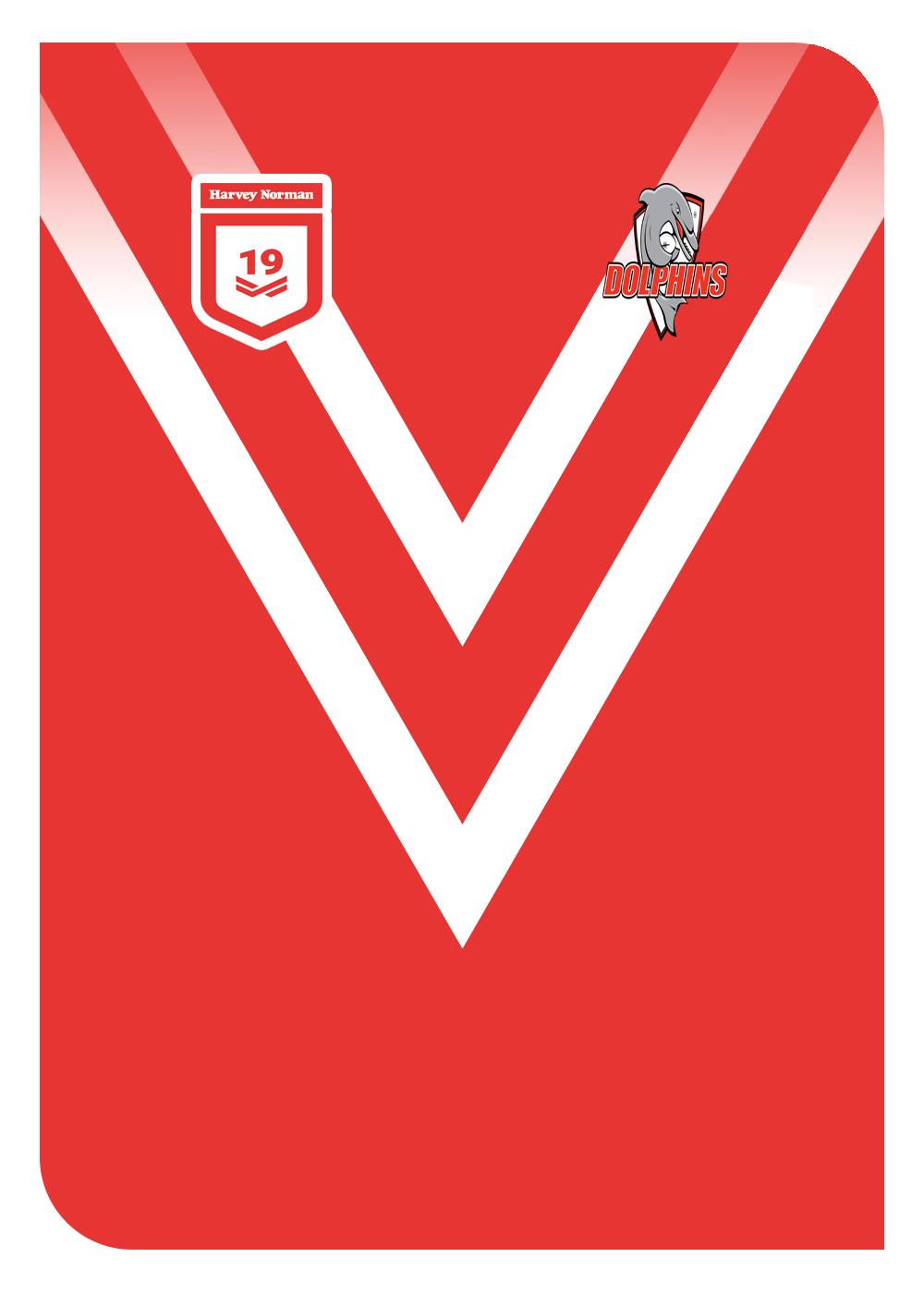
Redcliffe Dolphins Ground: Kayo Stadium City/Suburb: Brisbane (Redcliffe) Coach: TBA Affiliate: Redcliffe Dolphins

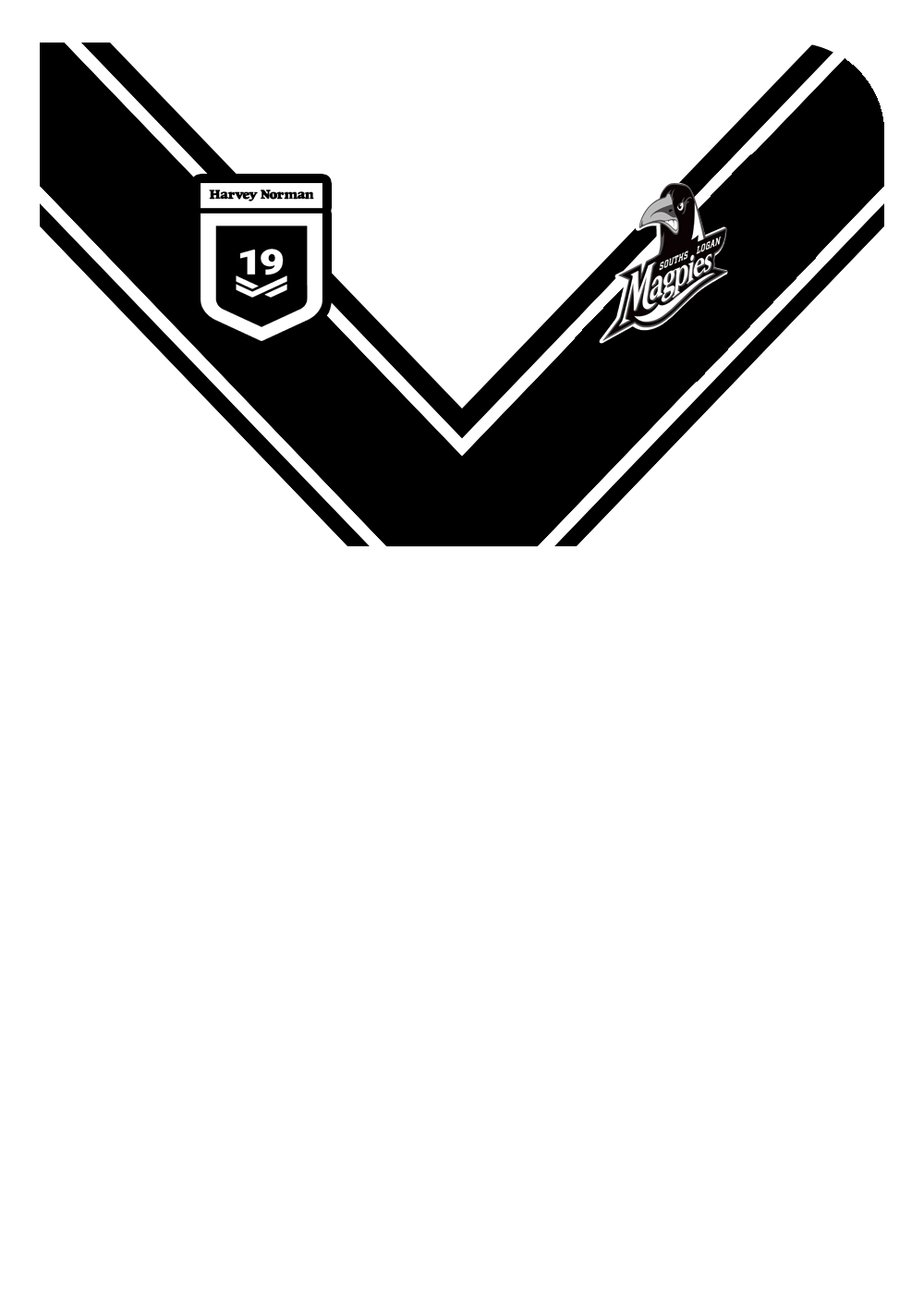
Souths Logan Magpies Ground: Davies Park City/Suburb: Brisbane (West End) Coach: TBA Affiliate: Souths Logan Magpies

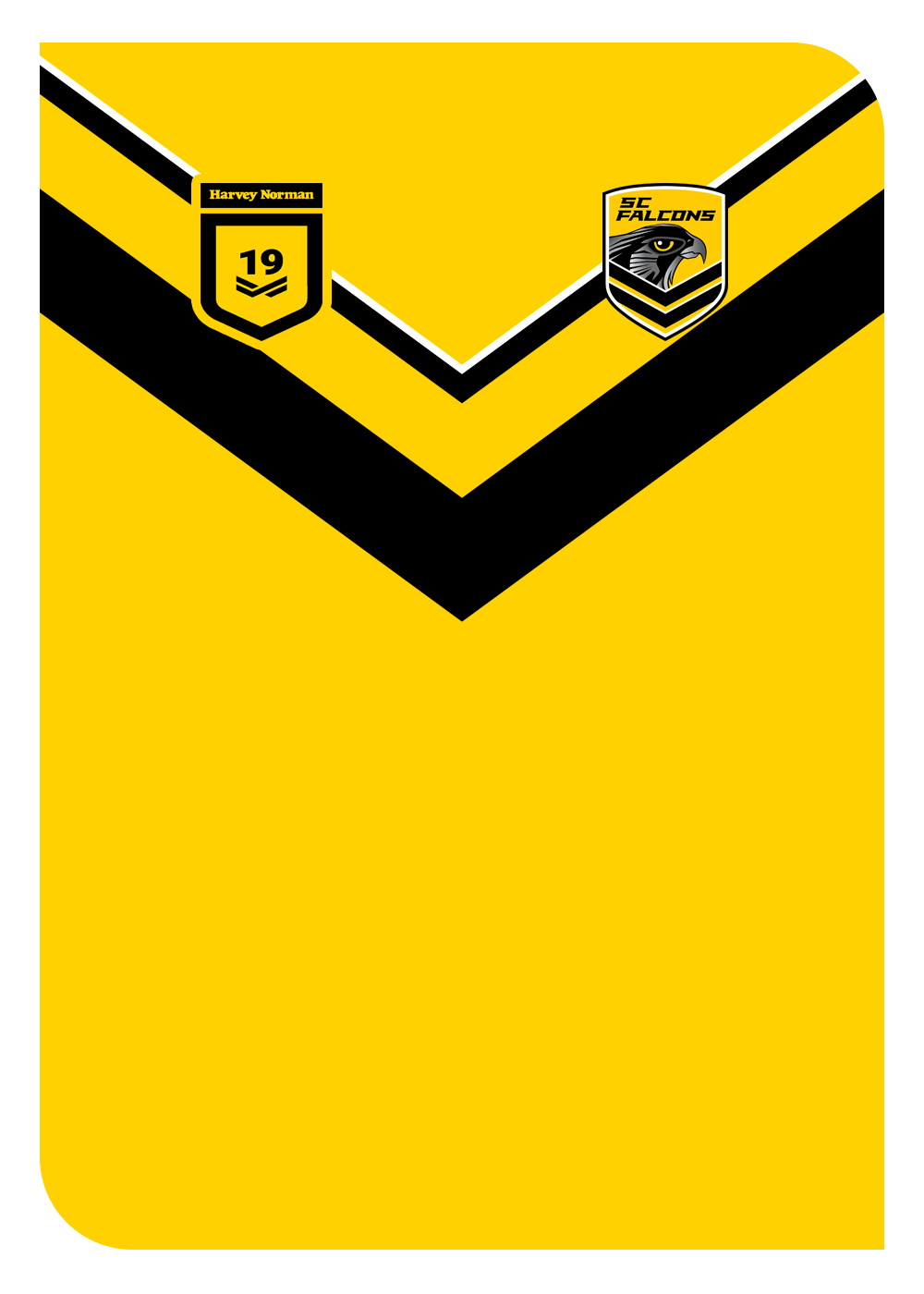
Sunshine Coast Falcons Ground: Sunshine Coast Stadium City/Suburb: Sunshine Coast (Bokarina) Coach: TBA Affiliate: Sunshine Coast Falcons

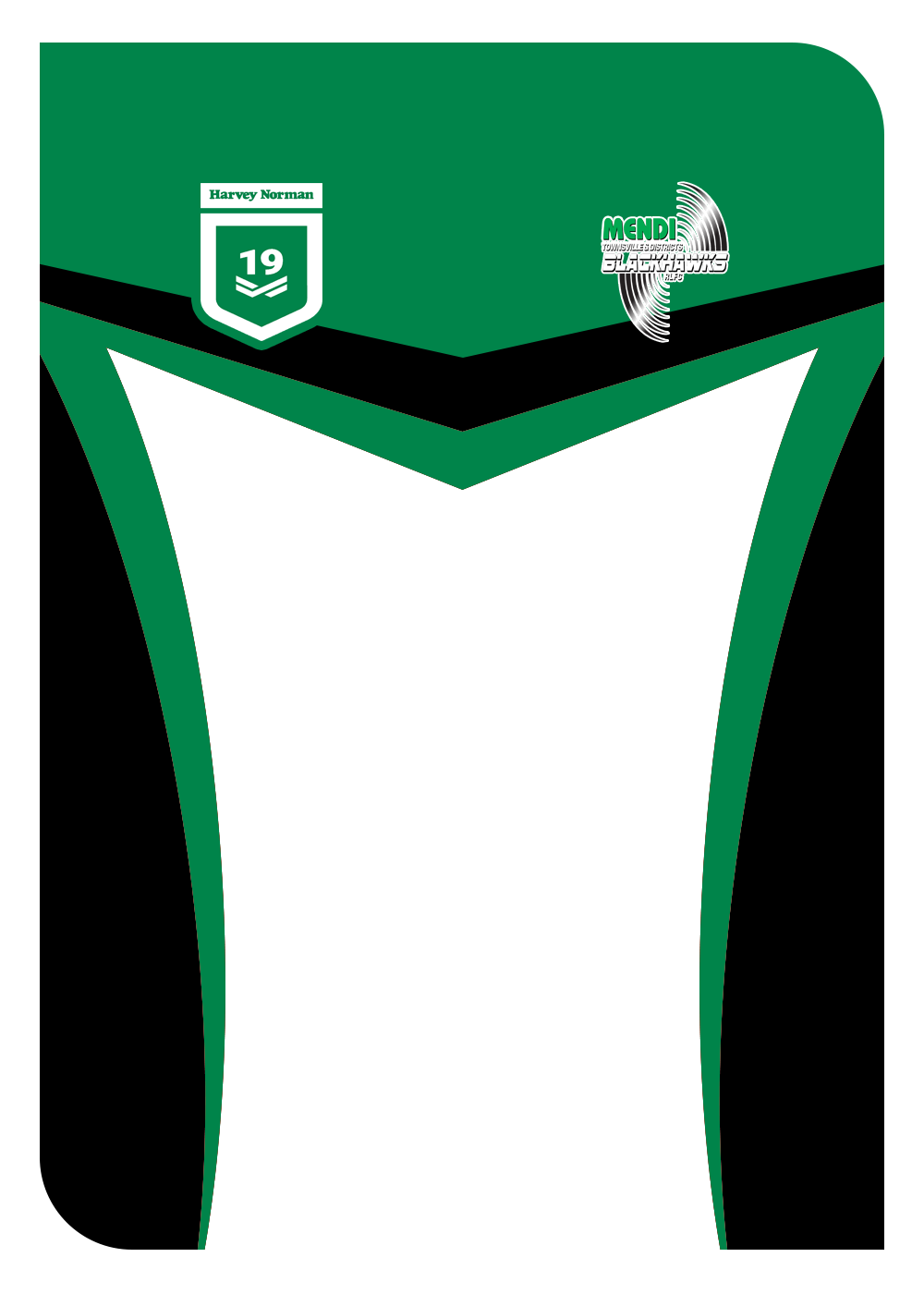
Townsville Blackhawks Ground: Jack Manski Oval City/Suburb: Townsville (Kirwan) Coach: TBA Affiliate: Townsville Blackhawks

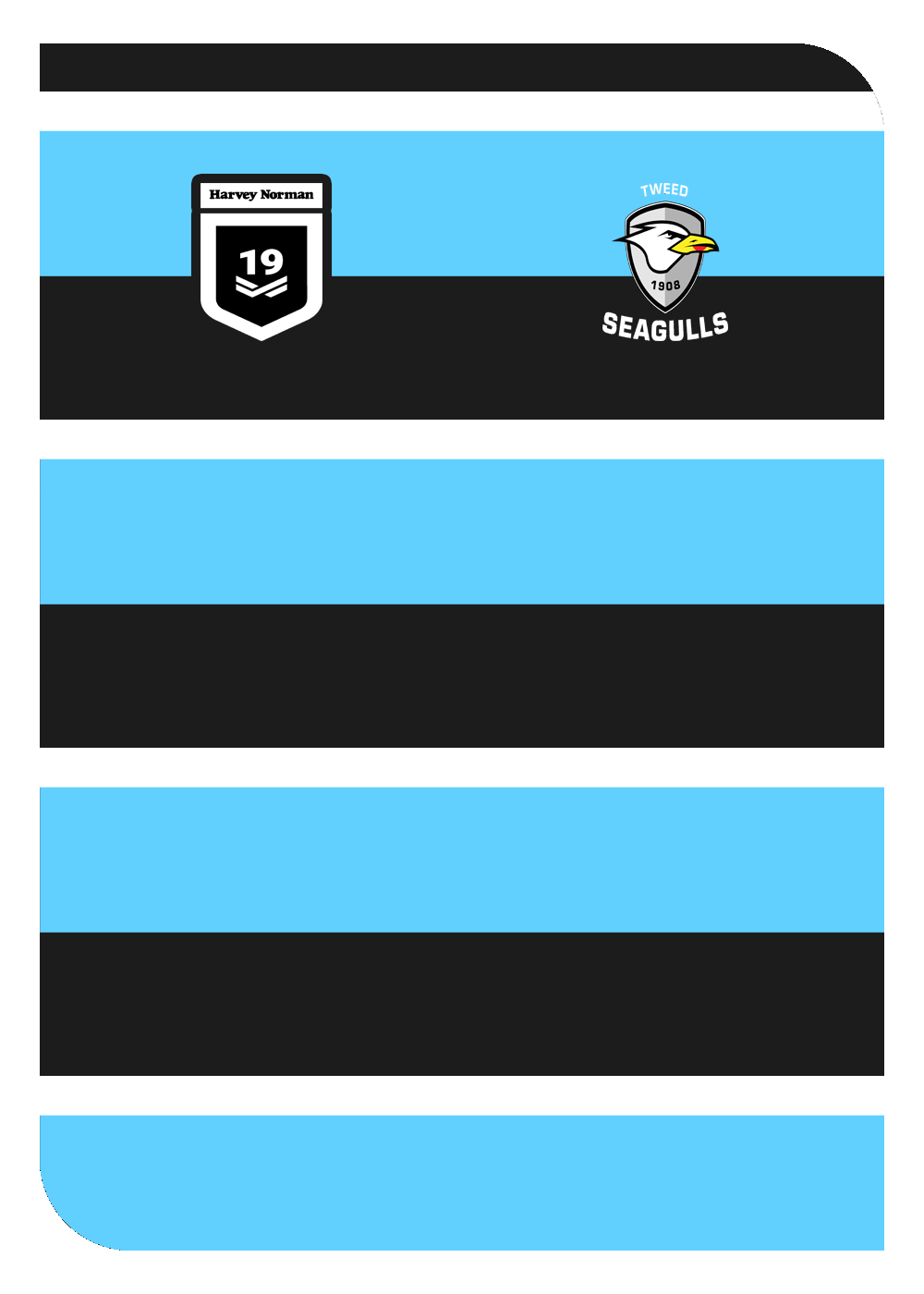
Tweed Heads Seagulls Ground: Preston Building Sports Complex City/Suburb: Tweed Heads (Tweed Heads West) Coach: TBA Affiliate: Tweed Heads Seagulls

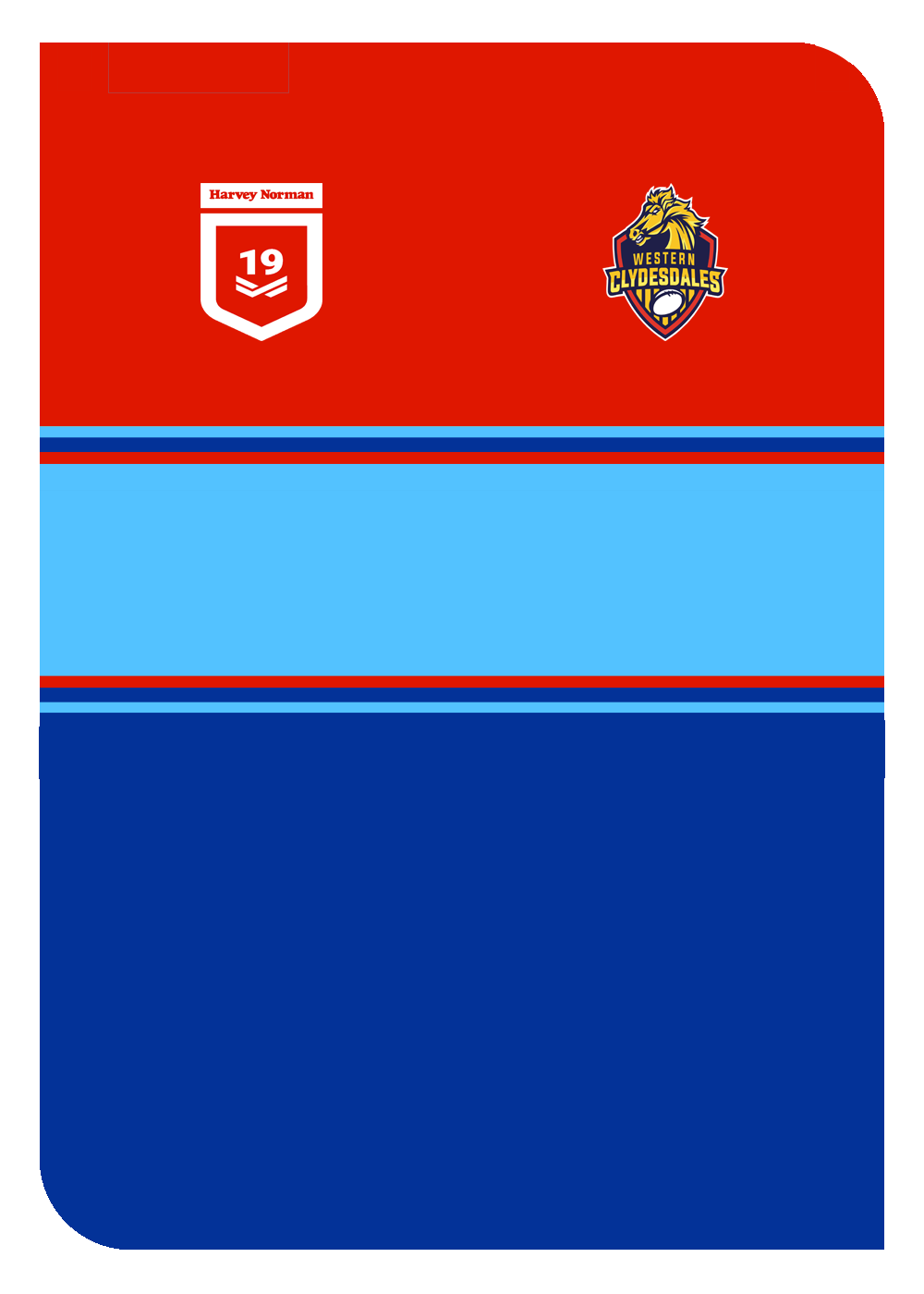
Western Clydesdales Ground: Toowoomba Sports Ground City/Suburb: Toowoomba (East Toowoomba) Coach: TBA Affiliate: Western Clydesdales

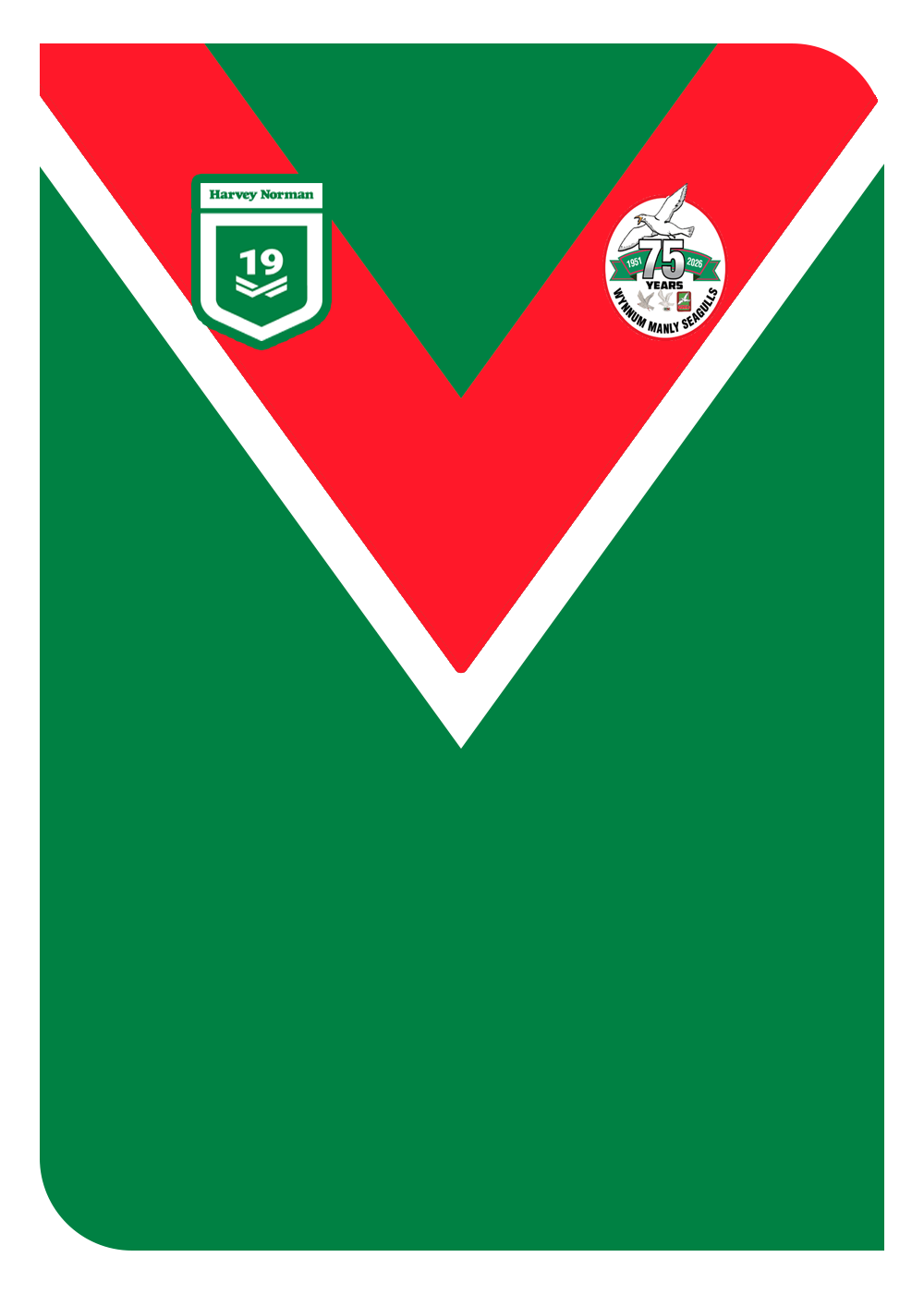
Wynnum Manly Seagulls Ground: BMD Kougari Oval City/Suburb: Brisbane (Manly West) Coach: TBA Affiliate: Wynnum Manly Seagulls

==== Ladder ====
Pos	Team	Pld	W	D	L	B	PF	PA	PD	Pts	Qualification
1	Souths Logan Magpies (U19s G)	6	6	0	0	0	232	50	+182	12	Minor Premiers & Semi-Finals
2	Wynnum Manly Seagulls (U19s G)	6	5	0	1	0	164	94	+70	10	Semi-Finals
3	Brisbane Tigers (U19s G)	6	4	0	2	0	172	72	+100	8	Semi-Finals
4	Townsville Blackhawks (U19s G)	6	3	2	1	0	108	74	+34	8	Semi-Finals
5	Sunshine Coast Falcons (U19s G)	6	4	0	2	0	118	92	+26	8	
6	Ipswich Jets (U19s G)	6	3	1	2	0	112	128	–16	7	
7	Redcliffe Dolphins (U19s G)	6	3	0	3	0	106	106	+0	6	
8	Burleigh Bears (U19s G)	6	3	0	3	0	102	134	–32	6	
9	Western Clydesdales (U19s G)	6	2	1	3	0	114	104	+10	5	
10	Mackay Cutters (U19s G)	6	1	2	3	0	60	76	–16	4	
11	Tweed Heads Seagulls (U19s G)	6	2	0	4	0	98	160	–62	4	
12	Central Queensland Capras (U19s G)	6	2	0	4	0	56	158	-102	4	
13	Norths Devils (U19s G)	6	1	0	5	0	104	176	–72	2	
14	Northern Pride (U19s G)	6	0	0	6	0	56	178	-122	0	

Updated to match(es) played on 1 September. Source:
Rules for classification: 1) points; 2) point difference; 3) points scored

===== Ladder progression =====
- Numbers highlighted in green indicate that the team finished the round inside the top 4.
- Numbers highlighted in blue indicates the team finished first on the ladder in that round.
- Numbers highlighted in red indicates the team finished last place on the ladder in that round.
- Underlined numbers indicate that the team had a bye during that round.

Pos	Team	2	3	1	4	5	6
1	Souths Logan Magpies (U19s G)	6	8	8	8	10	12
2	Wynnum Manly Seagulls (U19s G)	4	4	4	6	8	10
3	Brisbane Tigers (U19s G)	2	2	4	4	6	8
4	Townsville Blackhawks (U19s G)	3	5	5	5	6	8
5	Sunshine Coast Falcons (U19s G)	2	4	4	6	6	8
6	Ipswich Jets (U19s G)	2	3	3	5	7	7
7	Redcliffe Dolphins (U19s G)	2	2	2	4	6	6
8	Burleigh Bears (U19s G)	2	4	4	4	4	6
9	Western Clydesdales (U19s G)	2	3	3	5	5	5
10	Mackay Cutters (U19s G)	1	3	3	3	4	4
11	Tweed Heads Seagulls (U19s G)	2	2	2	4	4	4
12	Central Queensland Capras (U19s G)	2	2	2	2	2	4
13	Norths Devils (U19s G)	0	0	0	0	2	2
14	Northern Pride (U19s G)	0	0	0	0	0	0

Season Results:

Home	Score	Away	Match Information
Home	Score	Away	Date and Time	Venue	Referee	Video
Round 1
Ipswich Jets (U19s G)	20 – 18	Northern Pride (U19s G)	Saturday, 14 February, 1:20pm	Richardson Park	TBA
Burleigh Bears (U19s G)	34 – 6	Central Queensland Capras (U19s G)	Saturday, 14 February, 2:40pm	Betty Diamond Sports Complex	TBA
Mackay Cutters (U19s G)	10 – 20	Western Clydesdales (U19s G)	Saturday, 14 February, 3:00pm	Rugby League Mackay Grounds	TBA
Townsville Blackhawks (U19s G)	26 – 10	Sunshine Coast Falcons (U19s G)	Saturday, 14 February, 3:30pm	Jack Manski Oval	TBA
Redcliffe Dolphins (U19s G)	18 – 14	Norths Devils (U19s G)	Saturday, 14 February, 4:40pm	Kayo Stadium	TBA
Souths Logan Magpies (U19s G)	48 – 4	Wynnum Manly Seagulls (U19s G)	Sunday, 15 February, 10:20am	Davies Park	TBA
Tweed Heads Seagulls (U19s G)	4 – 36	Brisbane Tigers (U19s G)	Wednesday, 4 March, 7:00pm	Preston Building Sports Complex	TBA
Round 2
Brisbane Tigers (U19s G)	22 – 12	Redcliffe Dolphins (U19s G)	Saturday, 21 February, 9:30am	Totally Workwear Stadium	Harry Kalpakidis
Norths Devils (U19s G)	22 – 32	Wynnum Manly Seagulls (U19s G)	Saturday, 21 February, 2:00pm	Premiers' Park	Ethan Garton
Burleigh Bears (U19s G)	0 – 46	Souths Logan Magpies (U19s G)	Saturday, 21 February, 2:40pm	UAA Park	Ben Burgess
Central Queensland Capras (U19s G)	18 – 14	Western Clydesdales (U19s G)	Saturday, 21 February, 3:20pm	Webb Park	Jake Elias
Tweed Heads Seagulls (U19s G)	28 – 14	Ipswich Jets (U19s G)	Saturday, 21 February, 3:30pm	Preston Building Sports Complex	Amelia Ac
Sunshine Coast Falcons (U19s G)	40 – 4	Northern Pride (U19s G)	Sunday, 22 February, 1:40pm	Sunshine Coast Stadium	Thomas Burke
Townsville Blackhawks (U19s G)	0 – 0*	Mackay Cutters (U19s G)	N/A
Round 3
Wynnum Manly Seagulls (U19s G)	30 – 8	Tweed Heads Seagulls (U19s G)	Saturday, 8 February, 12:00pm	BMD Kougari Oval	TBA
Central Queensland Capras (U19s G)	8 – 14	Mackay Cutters (U19s G)	Saturday, 28 February, 12:20pm	Webb Park	Zac Kemp
Brisbane Tigers (U19s G)	14 – 26	Burleigh Bears (U19s G)	Saturday, 28 February, 2:00pm	Totally Workwear Stadium	Jake Elias
Sunshine Coast Falcons (U19s G)	20 – 10	Norths Devils (U19s G)	Saturday, 28 February, 2:40pm	Sunshine Coast Stadium	Ben Casey
Northern Pride (U19s G)	10 – 20	Townsville Blackhawks (U19s G)	Saturday, 28 February, 2:50pm	Barlow Park	Jai Sturgess
Souths Logan Magpies (U19s G)	22 – 16	Redcliffe Dolphins (U19s G)	Sunday, 1 March, 12:00pm	Davies Park	Harry Kalpakidis
Western Clydesdales (U19s G)	20 – 20	Ipswich Jets (U19s G)	Sunday, 1 March, 12:40pm	Toowoomba Sports Ground	Amelia Ac
Round 4
Souths Logan Magpies (U19s G)	20 – 16	Brisbane Tigers (U19s G)	Sunday, 9 February, 1:00pm	Totally Workwear Stadium	TBA
Wynnum Manly Seagulls (U19s G)	38 – 0	Central Queensland Capras (U19s G)	Saturday, 7 March, 9:30am	BMD Kougari Oval	Amelia Ac
Norths Devils (U19s G)	22 – 30	Tweed Heads Seagulls (U19s G)	Saturday, 7 March, 1:35pm	Premiers' Park	Harry Kalpakidis
Mackay Cutters (U19s G)	8 – 18	Sunshine Coast Falcons (U19s G)	Saturday, 7 March, 3:20pm	BB Print Stadium	Caden Graham
Western Clydesdales (U19s G)	18 – 6	Northern Pride (U19s G)	Sunday, 8 March, 8:30am	Toowoomba Sports Ground	Ethan Garton
Redcliffe Dolphins (U19s G)	16 – 12	Burleigh Bears (U19s G)	Sunday, 8 March, 11:40am	Kayo Stadium	Ben Burgess
Ipswich Jets (U19s G)	26 – 22	Townsville Blackhawks (U19s G)	Sunday, 8 March, 11:40am	Richardson Park	Jake Elias
Round 5
Burleigh Bears (U19s G)	6 – 32	Wynnum Manly Seagulls (U19s G)	Saturday, 14 March, 12:20pm	UAA Park	Ethan Garton
Mackay Cutters (U19s G)	14 – 14	Townsville Blackhawks (U19s G)	Saturday, 14 March, 1:20pm	BB Print Stadium	Luke McCullough
Northern Pride (U19s G)	4 – 54	Brisbane Tigers (U19s G)	Saturday, 14 March, 2:40pm	Barlow Park	Jai Sturgess
Tweed Heads Seagulls (U19s G)	8 – 34	Redcliffe Dolphins (U19s G)	Saturday, 14 March, 3:30pm	Preston Building Sports Complex	Kai Hoger
Souths Logan Magpies (U19s G)	44 – 8	Central Queensland Capras (U19s G)	Sunday, 15 March, 10:30am	Davies Park	Cullen Devene
Western Clydesdales (U19s G)	24 – 30	Norths Devils (U19s G)	Sunday, 15 March, 11:10am	Toowoomba Sports Ground	Harry Kalpakidis
Ipswich Jets (U19s G)	26 – 10	Sunshine Coast Falcons (U19s G)	Sunday, 15 March, 11:40am	Richardson Park	TBA
Round 6
Mackay Cutters (U19s G)	14 – 16	Central Queensland Capras (U19s G)	Saturday, 21 March, 1:20pm	BB Print Stadium	Caden Graham
Townsville Blackhawks (U19s G)	26 – 14	Northern Pride (U19s G)	Saturday, 21 March, 3:30pm	Jack Manski Oval	Jayden Windle
Tweed Heads Seagulls (U19s G)	20 – 24	Burleigh Bears (U19s G)	Saturday, 21 March, 3:30pm	Preston Building Sports Complex	Ben Burgess
Wynnum Manly Seagulls (U19s G)	28 – 10	Redcliffe Dolphins (U19s G)	Sunday, 22 March, 10:20am	BMD Kougari Oval	Harry Kalpakidis
Norths Devils (U19s G)	6 – 52	Souths Logan Magpies (U19s G)	Sunday, 22 March, 11:20am	Premiers' Park	Amelia Ac
Ipswich Jets (U19s G)	6 – 30	Brisbane Tigers (U19s G)	Sunday, 22 March, 11:40am	Richardson Park	Ethan Garton
Western Clydesdales (U19s G)	18 – 20	Sunshine Coast Falcons (U19s G)	Sunday, 22 March, 1:10pm	Toowoomba Sports Ground	Jake Elias
Finals Series
Semi-Finals
Souths Logan Magpies (U19s G)	34 – 6	Townsville Blackhawks (U19s G)	Saturday, 28 March, 12:15pm	Jack Manski Oval	Harry Kalpakidis
Wynnum Manly Seagulls (U19s G)	12 – 28	Brisbane Tigers (U19s G)	Sunday, 29 March, 12:00pm	BMD Kougari Oval	Ethan Garton
Grand Final
Souths Logan Magpies (U19s G)	V	Brisbane Tigers (U19s G)	Saturday, 11 April, 4:00pm	Kayo Stadium	TBA

==== Grand Final ====
Semi-Finals
1	Souths Logan	34
4	Townsville	6
2	Wynnum Manly	12
3	Brisbane	28

Grand Final
Souths Logan
Brisbane

2026 QRL Under 19's Women's Premiership Grand Final

Saturday, 11 April 2026
4:00pm

Souths Logan Magpies (U19s G)	v	Brisbane Tigers (U19s G)

Kayo Stadium, Brisbane

=== Cyril Connell Cup ===
The Cyril Connell Cup is the Queensland Rugby League's statewide under 17s competition for male players and the first statewide step in the elite male pathway. It sits below the Mal Meninga Cup and above local junior competitions, bringing together the best under 17s talent from regions across Queensland and northern New South Wales.

2026 Cyril Connell Cup
- Duration: 7 February – 11/12 April 2026
- Teams: 15
- Broadcast partners: Streaming; QPlus TV (All Matches)

==== Teams ====
The competition will feature the same 15 teams that competed in 2025. All 14 Australian based Queensland Cup sides field a team in this competition plus the Bundaberg based Wide Bay Bulls.

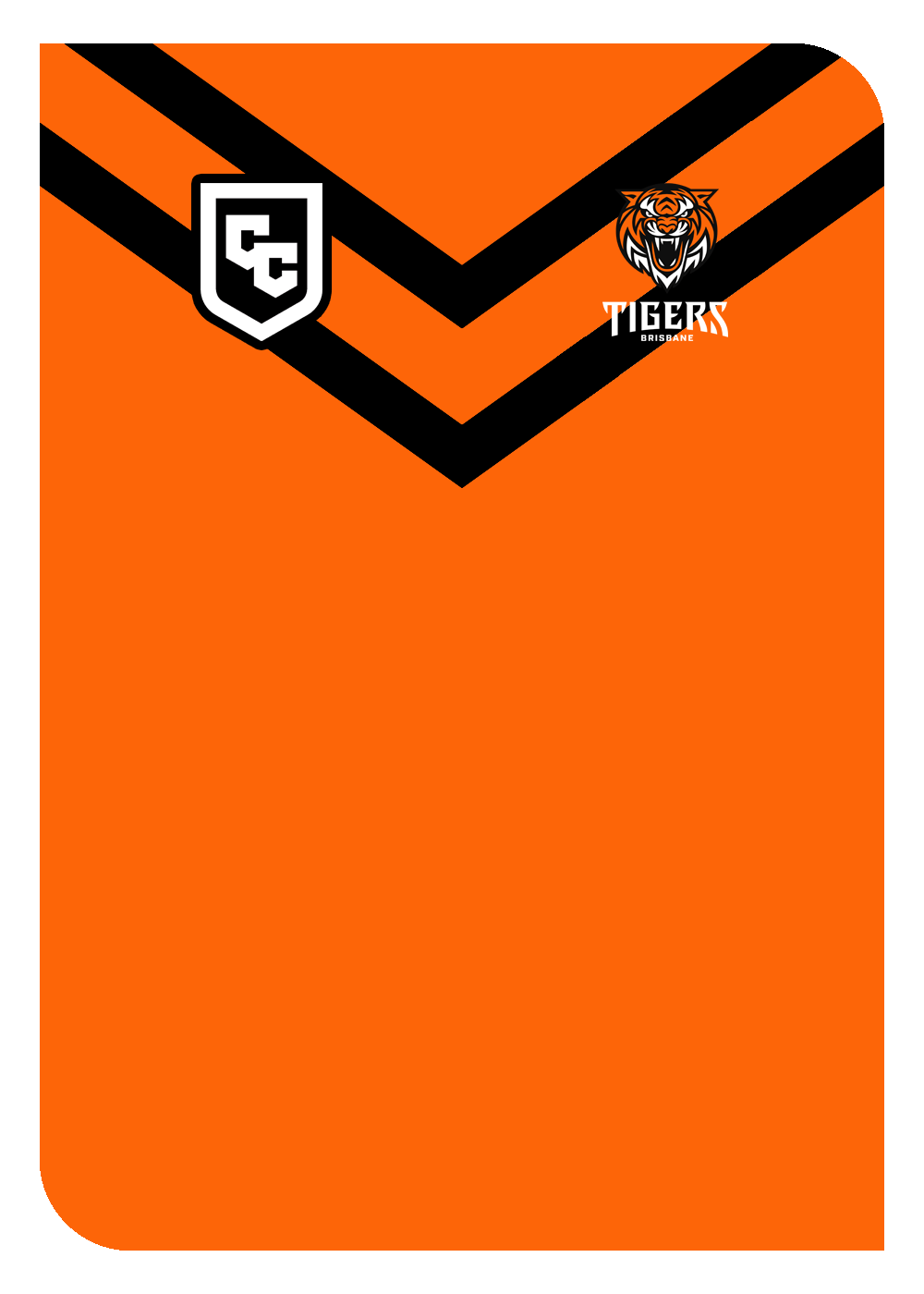
Brisbane Tigers Ground: Totally Workwear Stadium City/Suburb: Brisbane (Stones Corner) Coach: TBA Affiliate: Brisbane Tigers

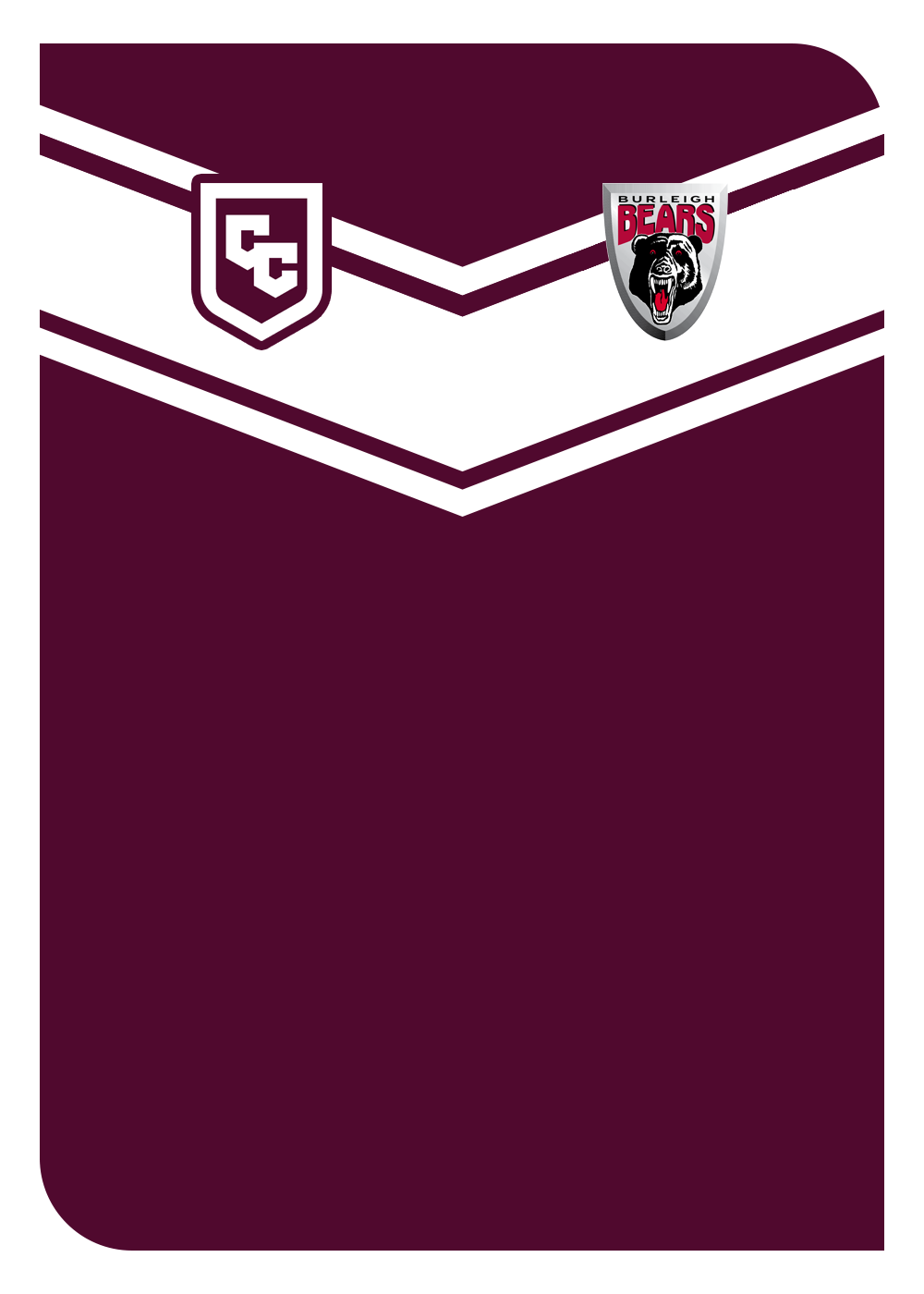
Burleigh Bears Ground: UAA Park City/Suburb: Gold Coast (Miami) Coach: TBA Affiliate: Burleigh Bears

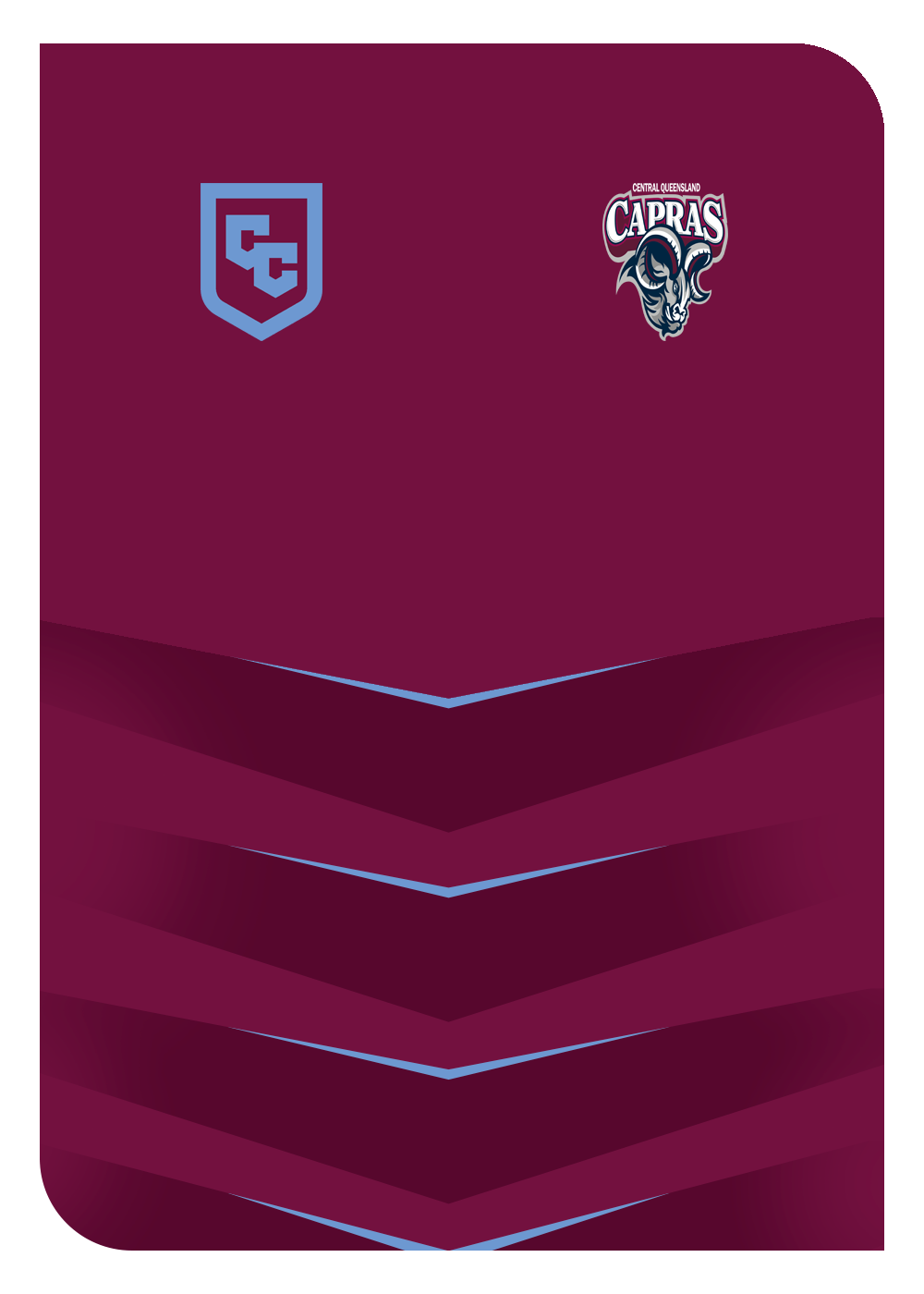
Central Queensland Capras Ground: Browne Park City/Suburb: Rockhampton (Wandal) Coach: TBA Affiliate: Central Queensland Capras

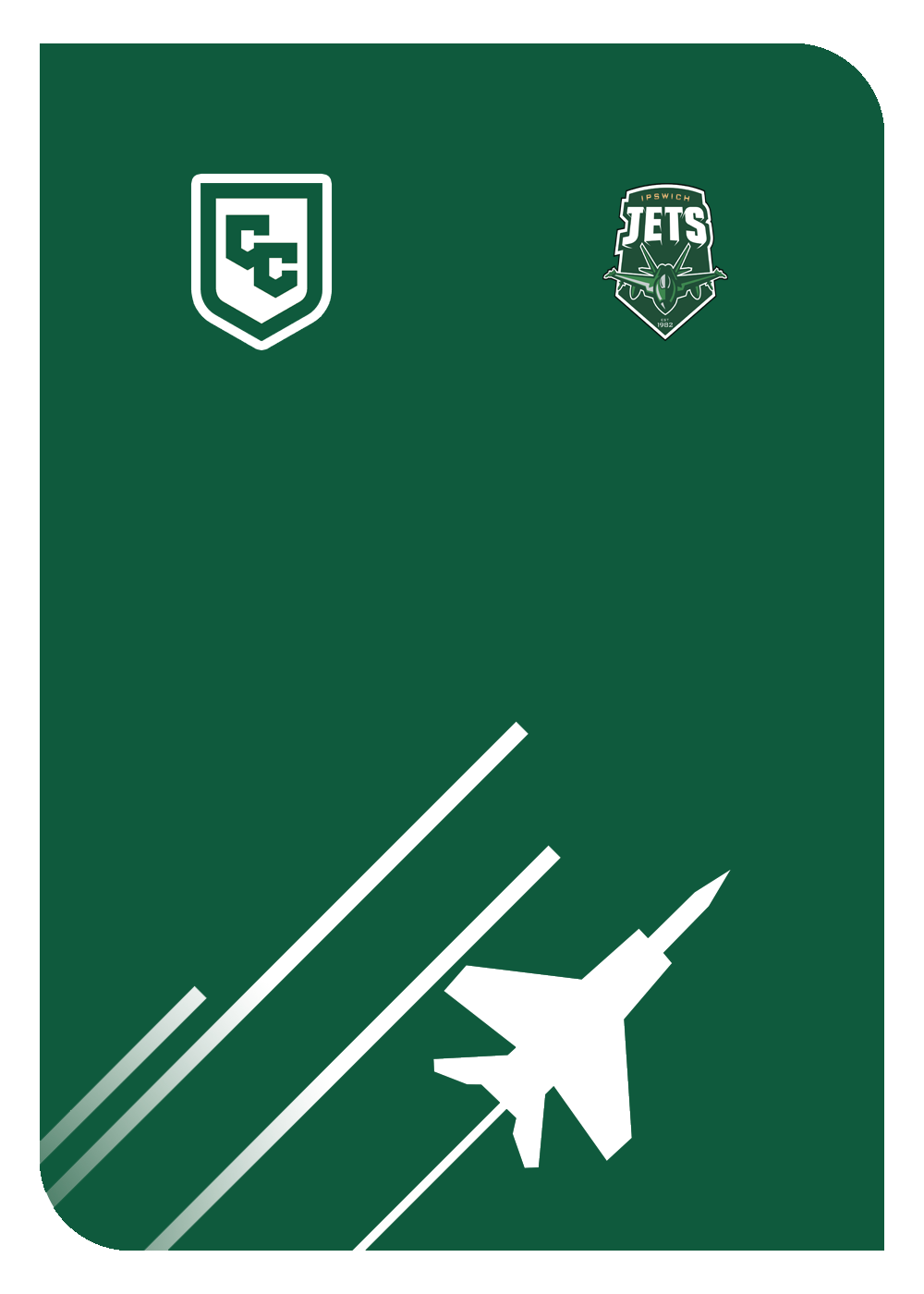
Ipswich Jets Ground: North Ipswich Reserve City/Suburb: Brisbane (Ipswich) Coach: TBA Affiliate: Ipswich Jets

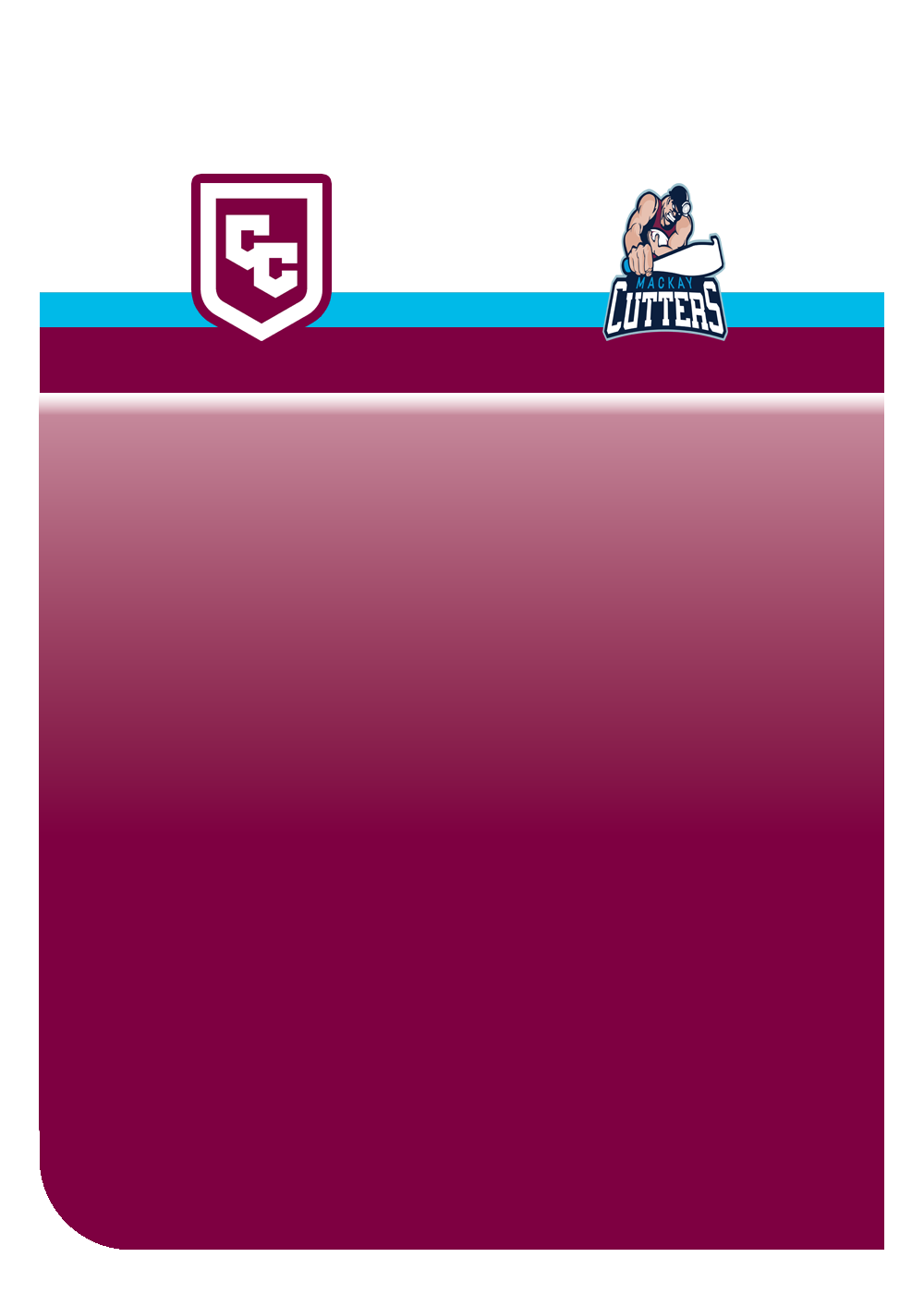
Mackay Cutters Ground: BB Print Stadium City/Suburb: Mackay (South Mackay) Coach: TBA Affiliate: Mackay Cutters

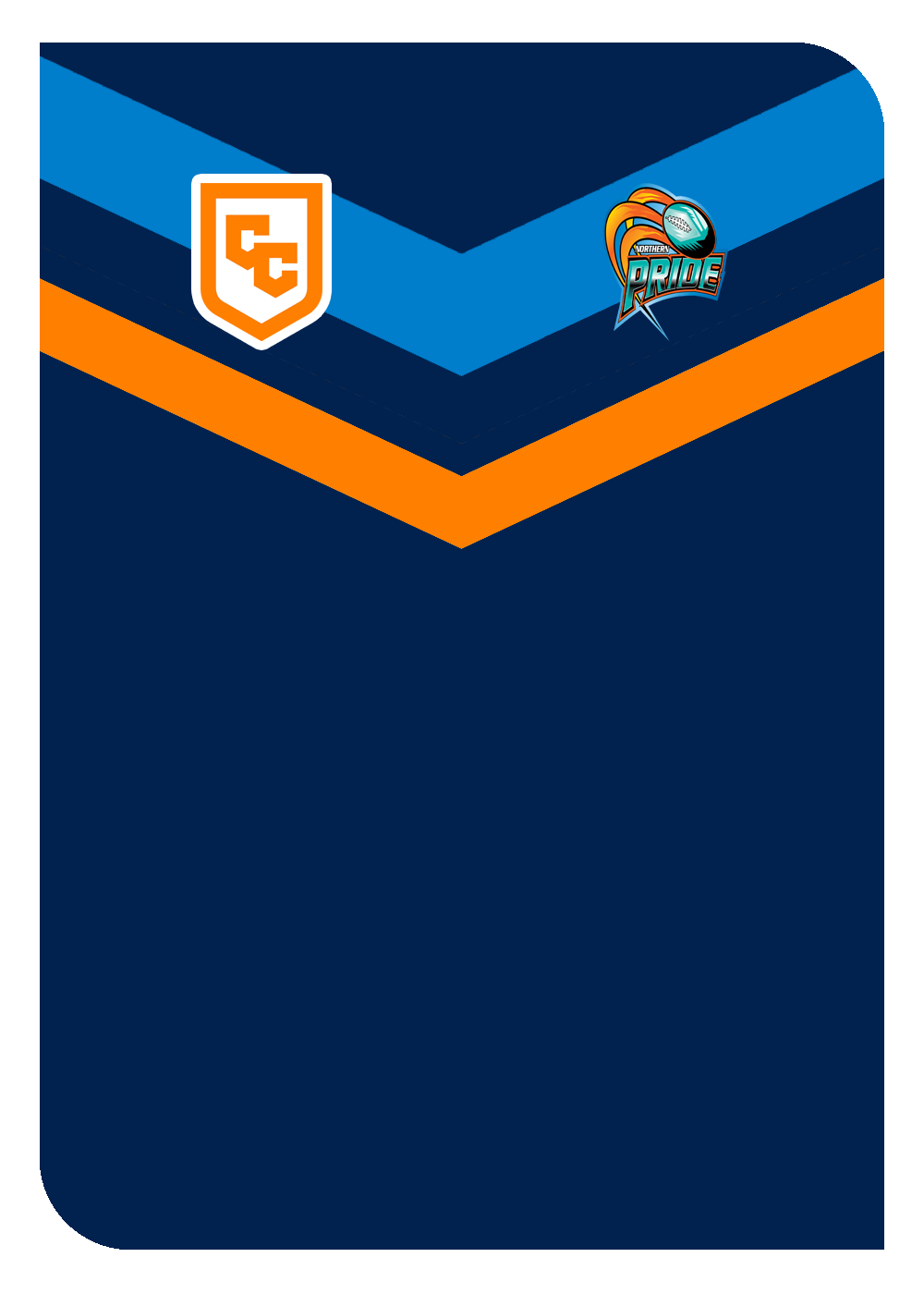
Northern Pride Ground: Barlow Park City/Suburb: Cairns (Parramatta Park) Coach: TBA Affiliate: Northern Pride

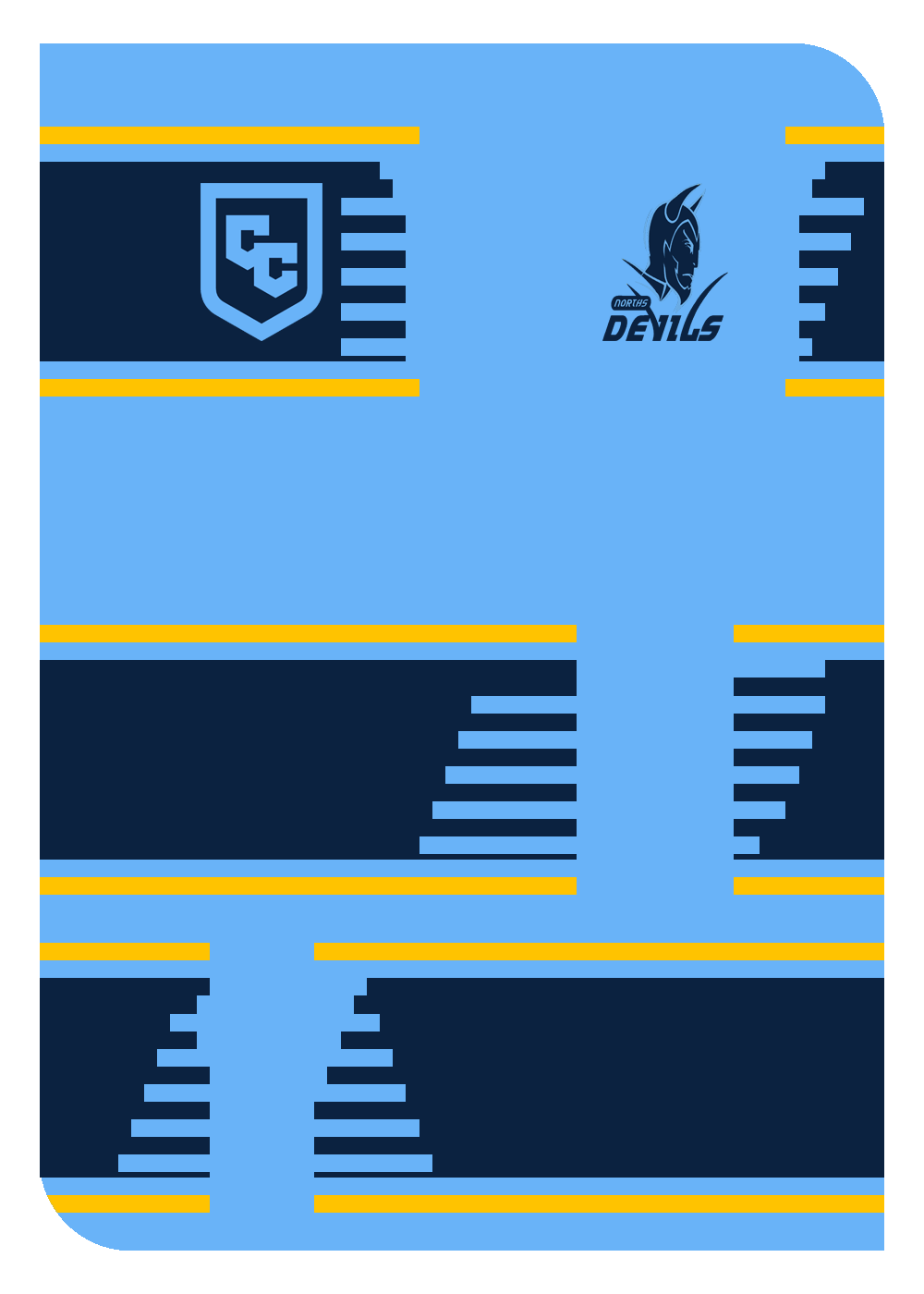
Norths Devils Ground: Premiers' Park City/Suburb: Brisbane (Nundah) Coach: TBA Affiliate: Norths Devils

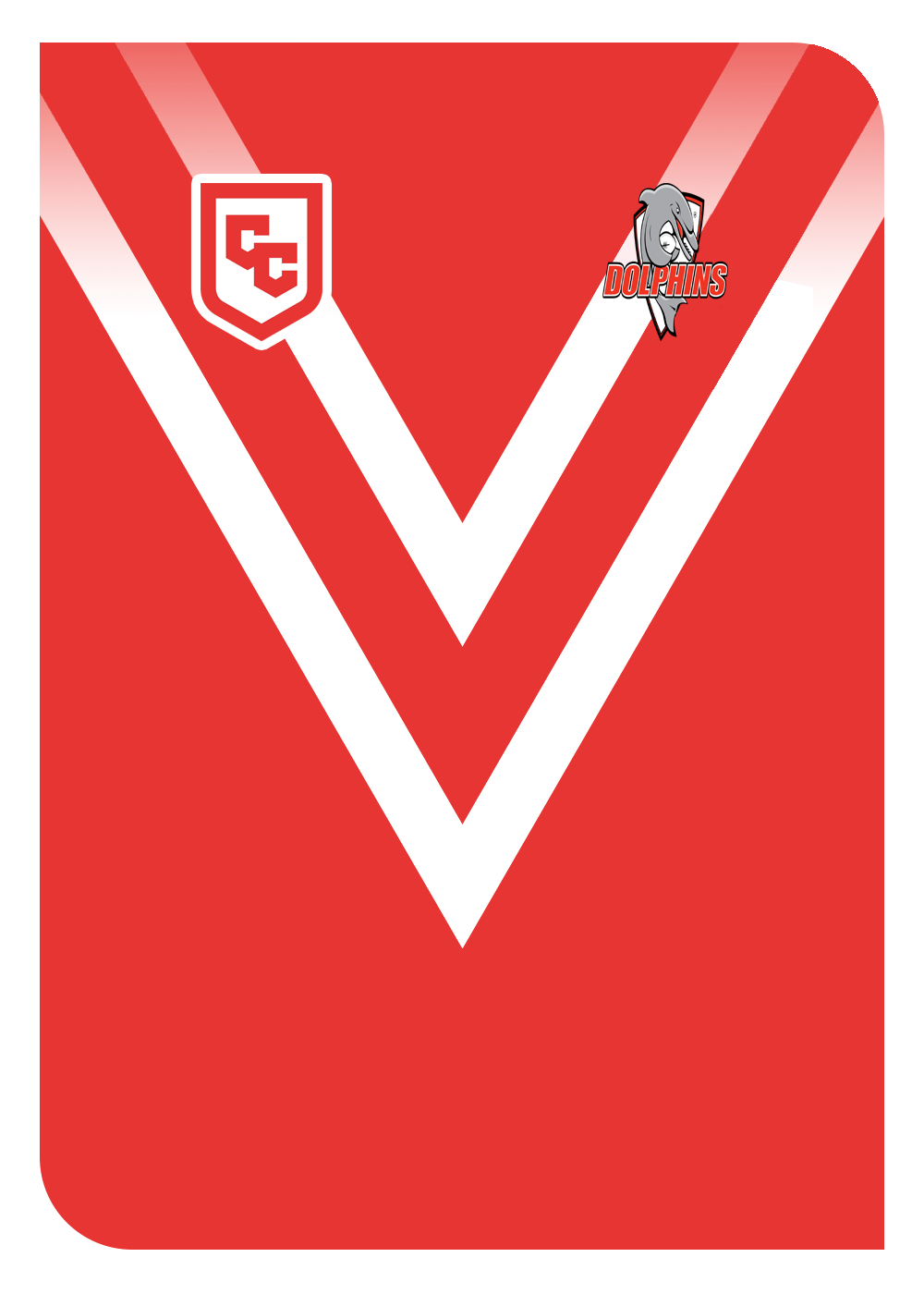
Redcliffe Dolphins Ground: Kayo Stadium City/Suburb: Brisbane (Redcliffe) Coach: TBA Affiliate: Redcliffe Dolphins

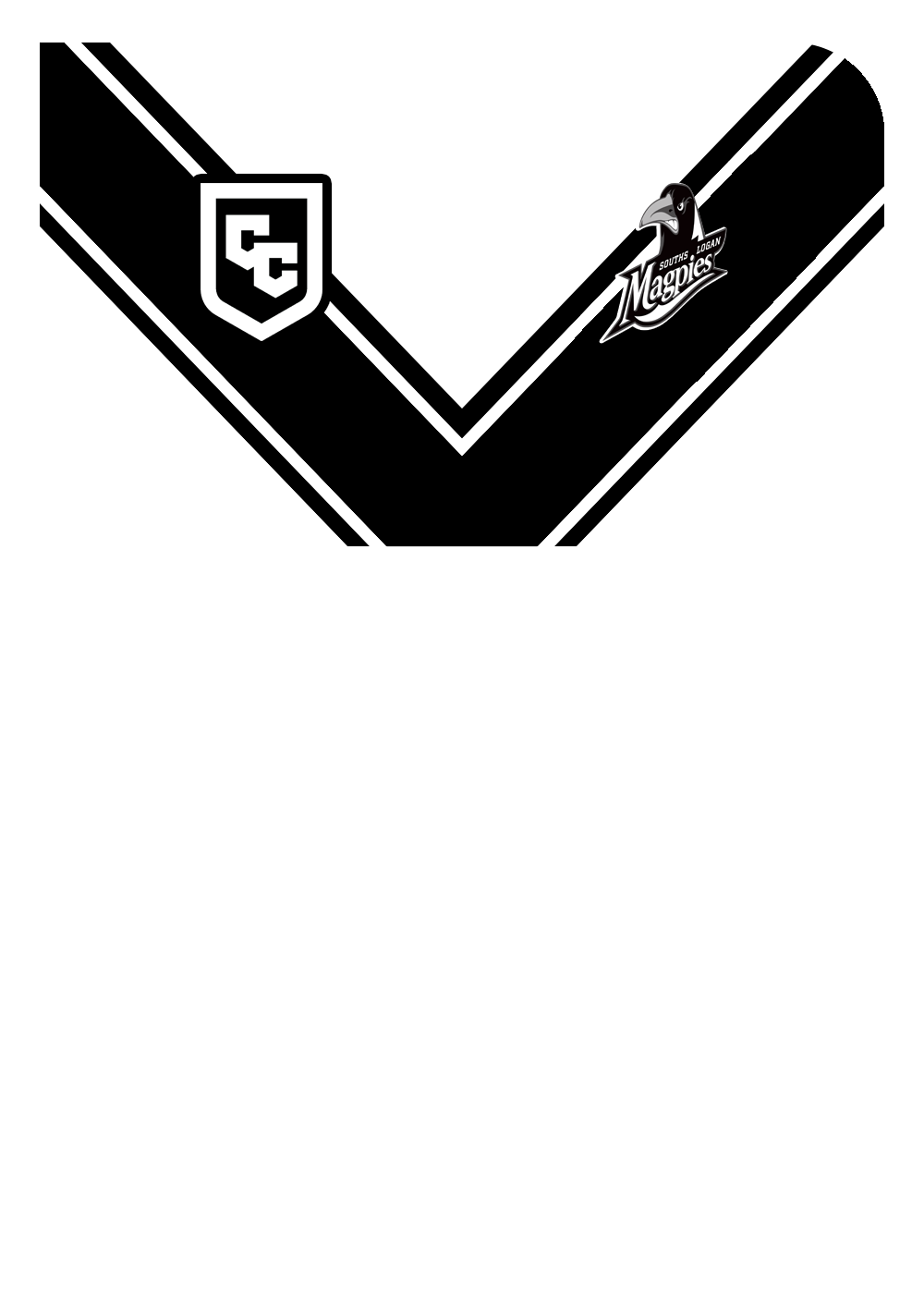
Souths Logan Magpies Ground: Davies Park City/Suburb: Brisbane (West End) Coach: TBA Affiliate: Souths Logan Magpies

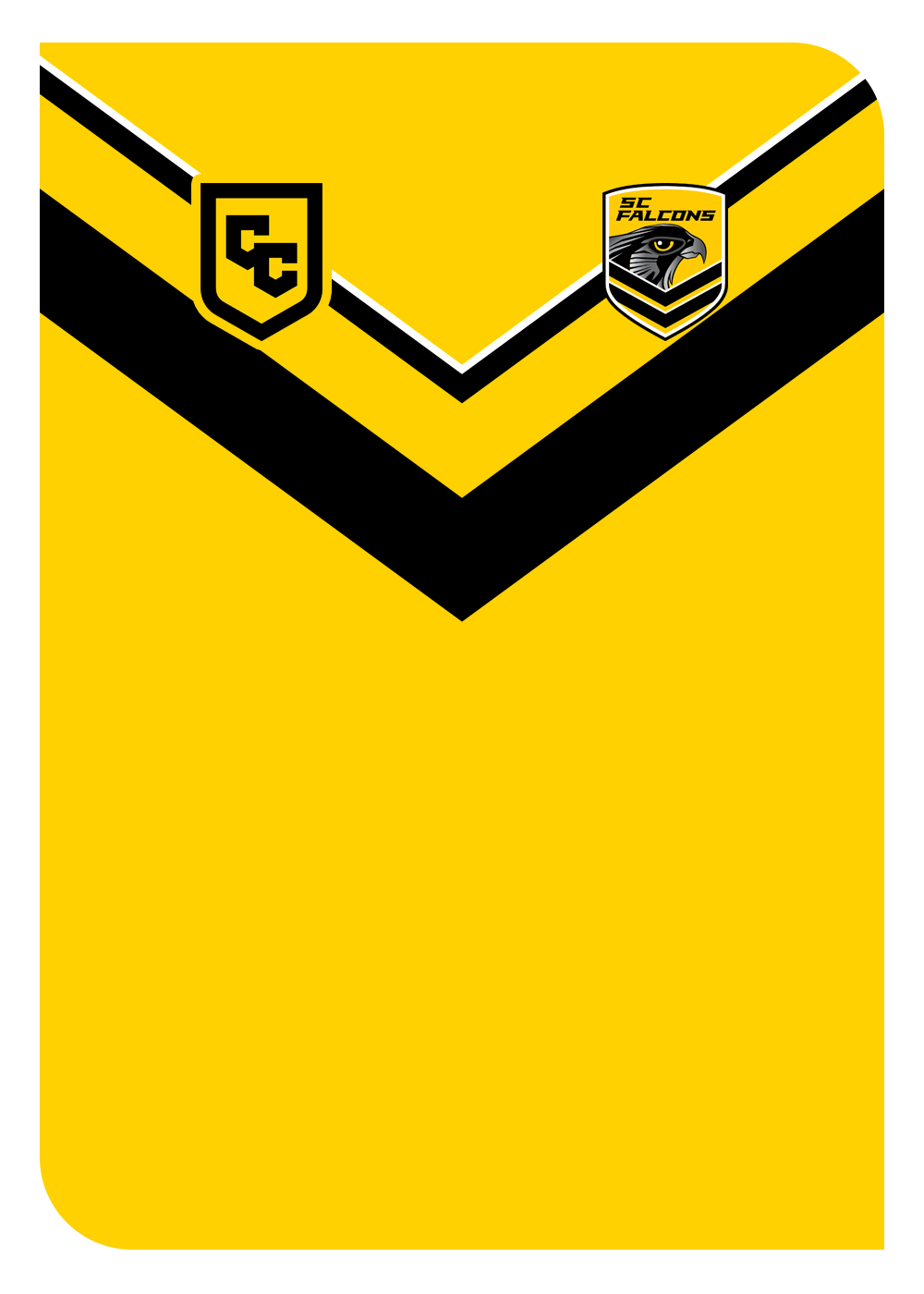
Sunshine Coast Falcons Ground: Sunshine Coast Stadium City/Suburb: Sunshine Coast (Bokarina) Coach: TBA Affiliate: Sunshine Coast Falcons

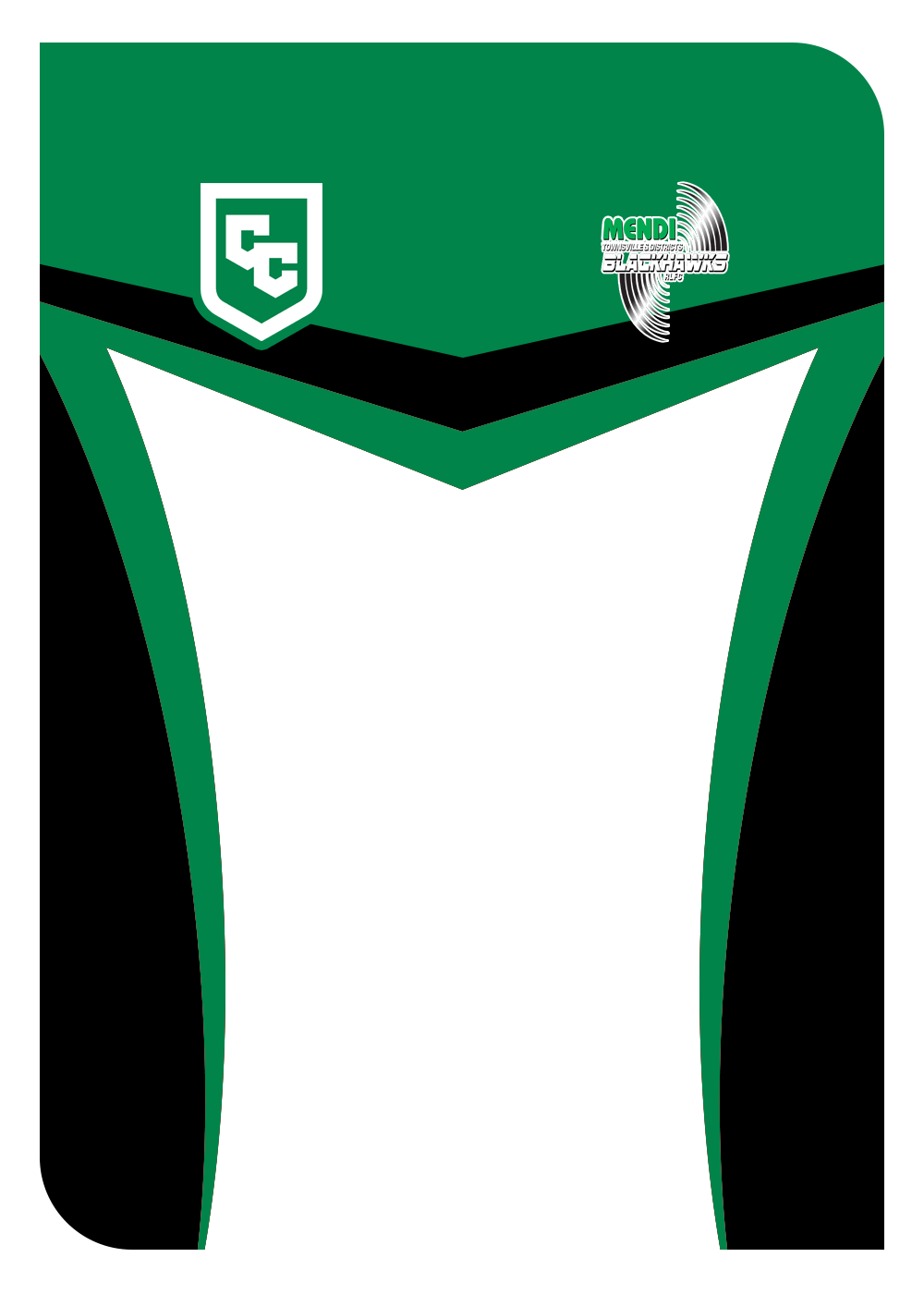
Townsville Blackhawks Ground: Jack Manski Oval City/Suburb: Townsville (Kirwan) Coach: TBA Affiliate: Townsville Blackhawks

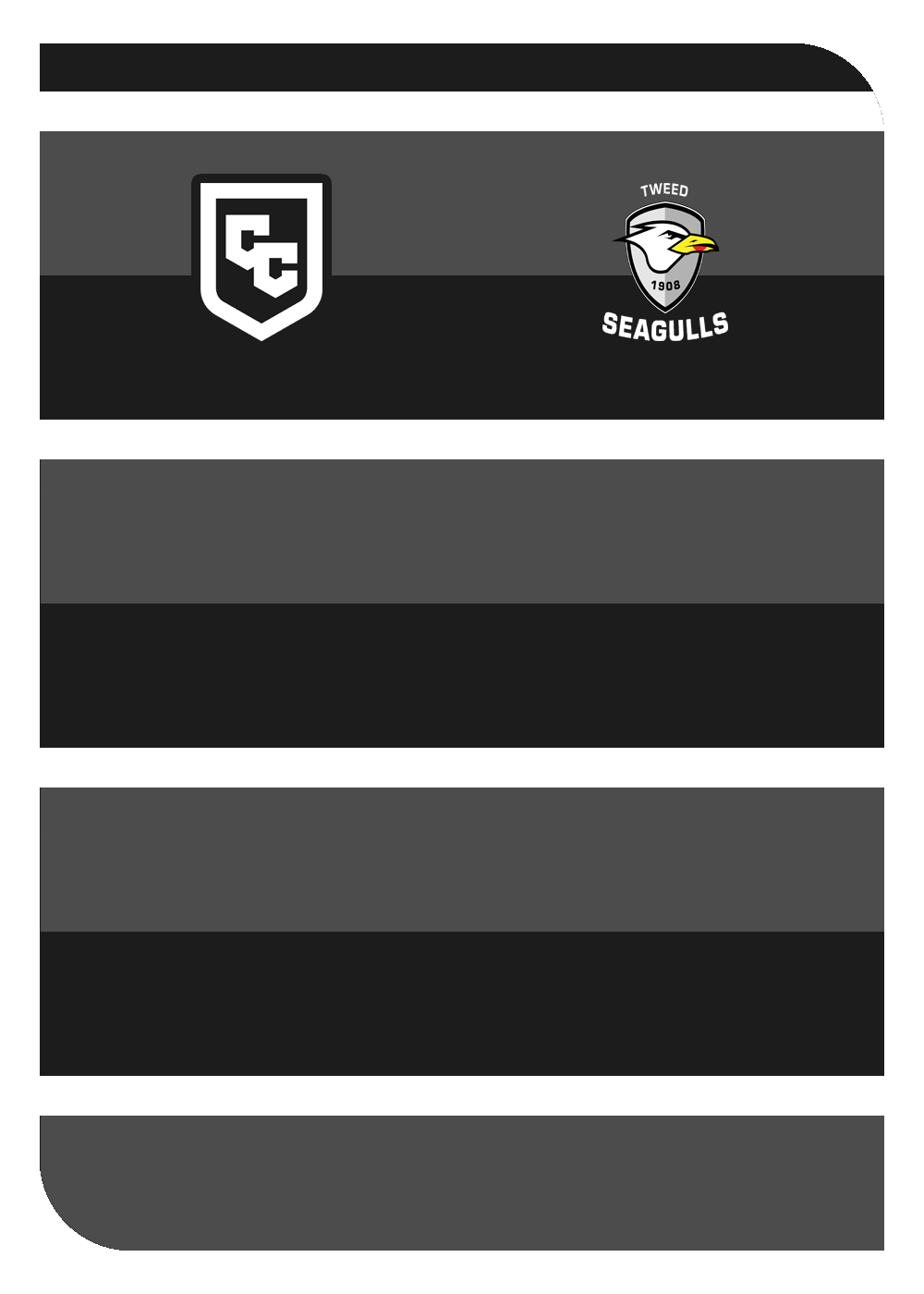
Tweed Heads Seagulls Ground: Preston Building Sports Complex City/Suburb: Tweed Heads (Tweed Heads West) Coach: TBA Affiliate: Tweed Heads Seagulls

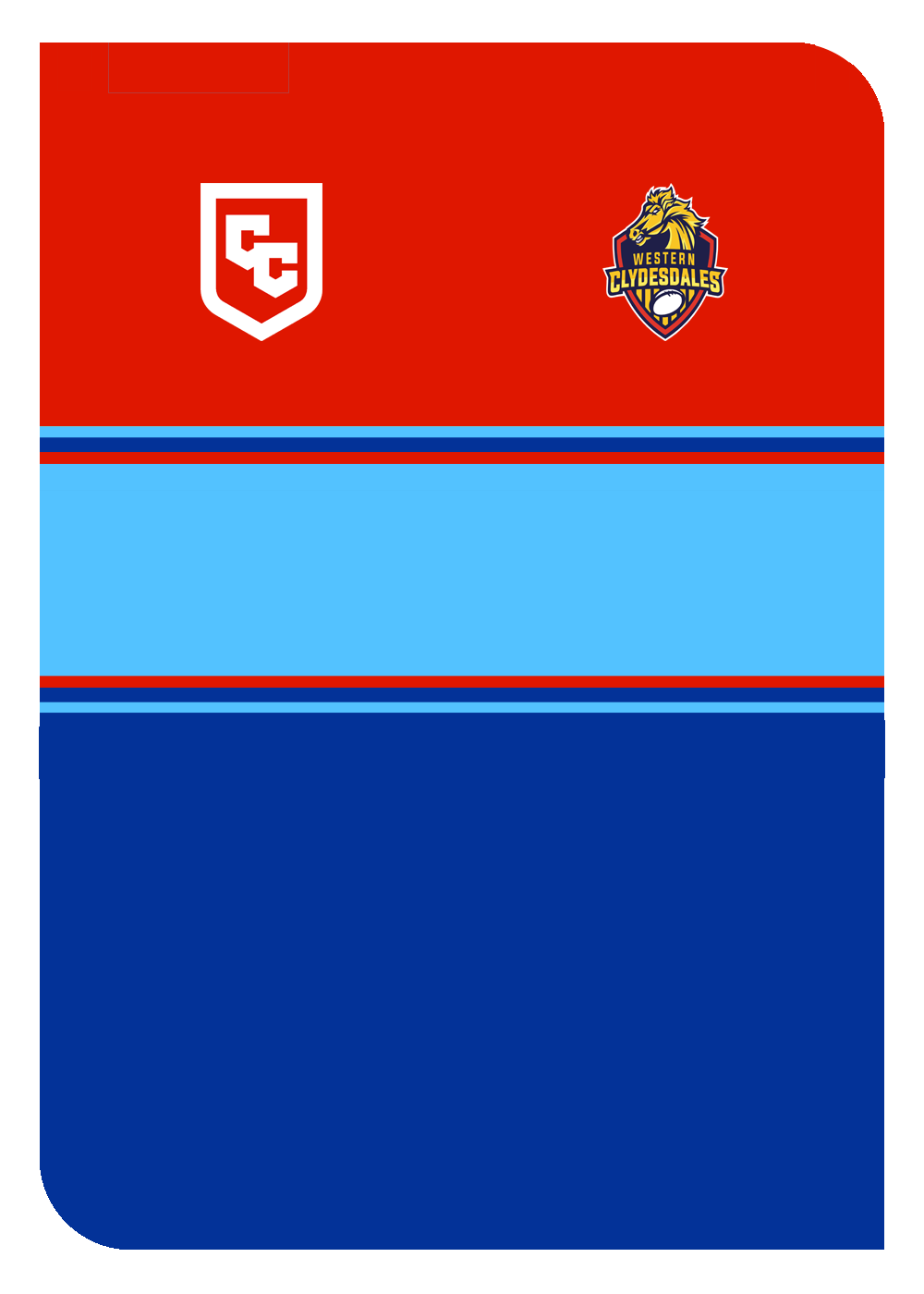
Western Clydesdales Ground: Toowoomba Sports Ground City/Suburb: Toowoomba (East Toowoomba) Coach: TBA Affiliate: Western Clydesdales

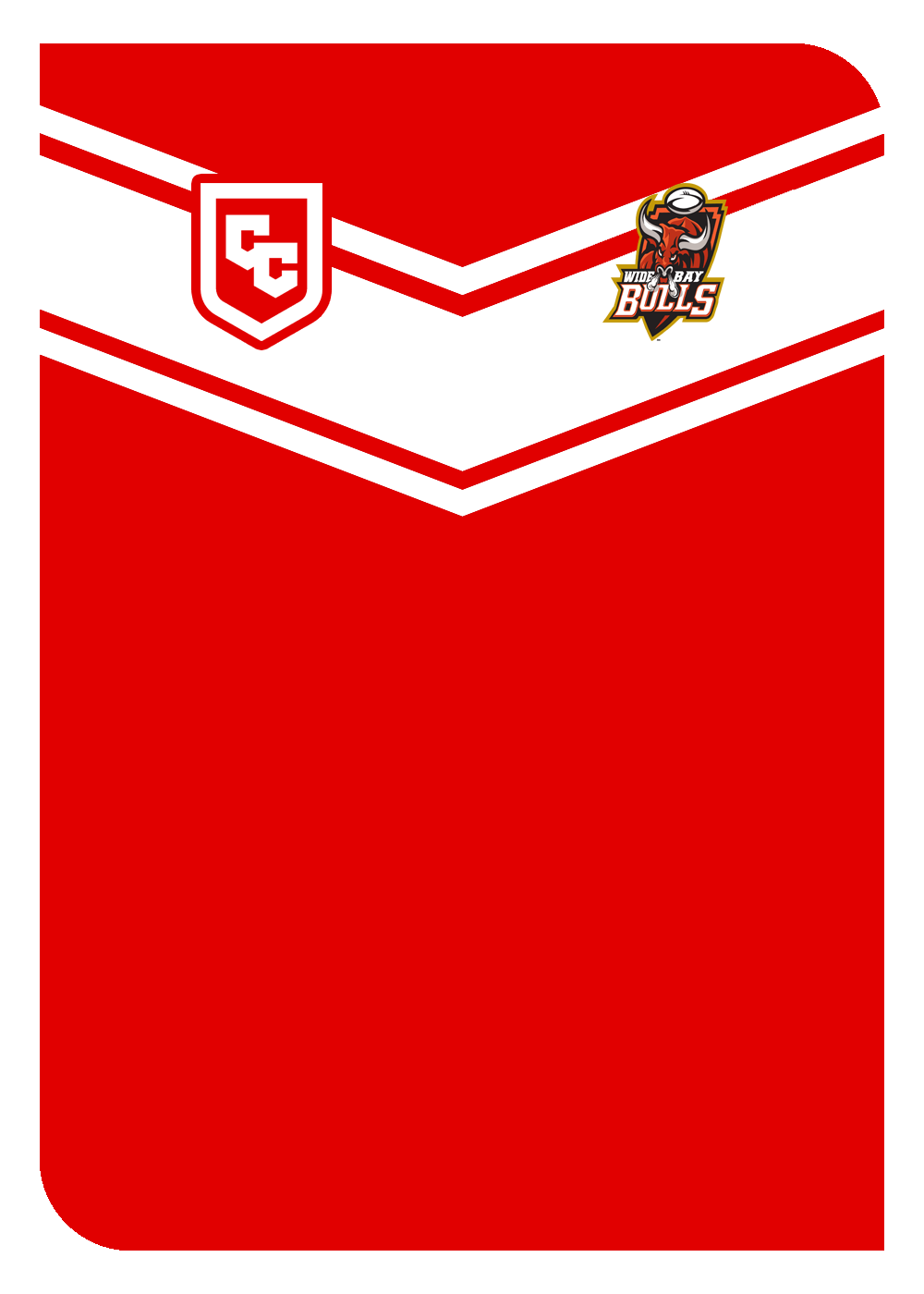
Wide Bay Bulls Ground: Salter Oval City/Suburb: Bundaberg (Bundaberg West) Coach: TBA Affiliate: N/A

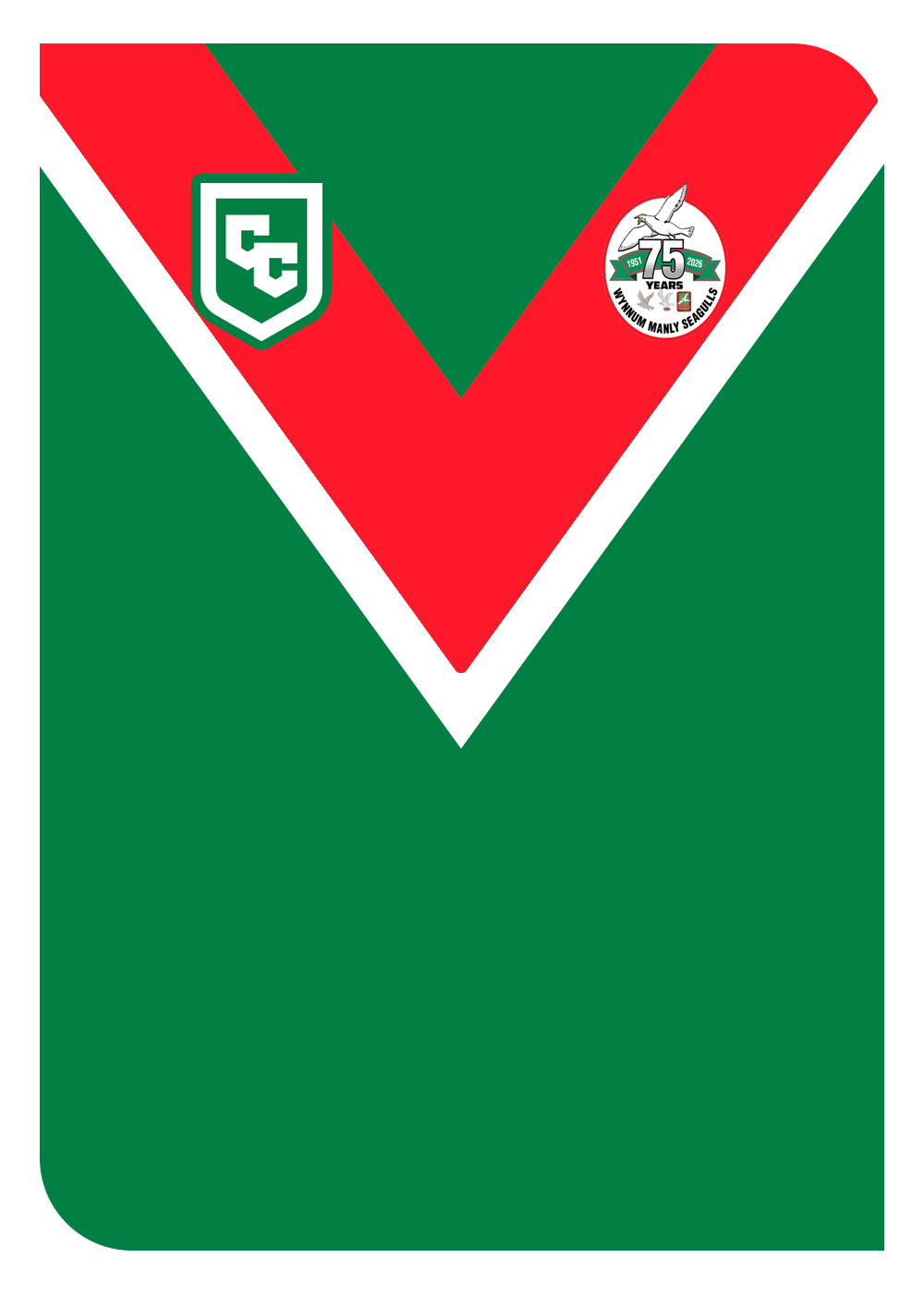
Wynnum Manly Seagulls Ground: BMD Kougari Oval City/Suburb: Brisbane (Manly West) Coach: TBA Affiliate: Wynnum Manly Seagulls

==== Ladder ====
Pos	Team	Pld	W	D	L	B	PF	PA	PD	Pts	Qualification
1	Wynnum Manly Seagulls (U17s)	6	6	0	0	1	174	62	+112	14	Minor Premiers & Semi-Finals
2	Norths Devils (U17s)	6	5	0	1	1	250	64	+186	12	Semi-Finals
3	Sunshine Coast Falcons (U17s)	6	5	0	1	1	153	82	+71	12	Semi-Finals
4	Townsville Blackhawks (U17s)	6	4	1	1	1	160	40	+120	11	Semi-Finals
5	Ipswich Jets (U17s)	6	4	0	2	1	188	96	+92	10	
6	Central Queensland Capras (U17s)	6	4	0	2	1	132	116	+16	10	
7	Brisbane Tigers (U17s)	6	3	0	3	1	106	86	+20	8	
8	Burleigh Bears (U17s)	6	3	0	3	1	104	100	+4	8	
9	Tweed Heads Seagulls (U17s)	6	2	0	4	1	80	108	–28	6	
10	Western Clydesdales (U17s)	6	2	0	4	1	92	138	–46	6	
11	Souths Logan Magpies (U17s)	6	2	0	4	1	84	146	–62	6	
12	Redcliffe Dolphins (U17s)	6	2	0	4	1	102	174	–72	6	
13	Mackay Cutters (U17s)	6	1	1	4	1	56	91	–35	5	
14	Northern Pride (U17s)	6	1	0	5	1	44	180	-136	4	
15	Wide Bay Bulls (U17s)	6	0	0	6	1	38	290	-252	2	

Updated to match(es) played on 1 September. Source:
Rules for classification: 1) points; 2) point difference; 3) points scored

===== Ladder progression =====
- Numbers highlighted in green indicate that the team finished the round inside the top 4.
- Numbers highlighted in blue indicates the team finished first on the ladder in that round.
- Numbers highlighted in red indicates the team finished last place on the ladder in that round.
- Underlined numbers indicate that the team had a bye during that round.

Pos	Team	1	2	3	4	5	6	7
1	Wynnum Manly Seagulls (U17s)	2	4	6	8	10	12	14
2	Norths Devils (U17s)	2	4	4	6	8	10	12
3	Sunshine Coast Falcons (U17s)	0	2	4	6	8	10	12
4	Townsville Blackhawks (U17s)	2	2	3	5	7	9	11
5	Ipswich Jets (U17s)	2	4	6	6	6	8	10
6	Central Queensland Capras (U17s)	2	4	6	8	8	8	10
7	Brisbane Tigers (U17s)	0	0	2	4	6	6	8
8	Burleigh Bears (U17s)	2	4	6	8	8	8	8
9	Tweed Heads Seagulls (U17s)	0	2	2	4	4	4	6
10	Western Clydesdales (U17s)	2	2	2	2	4	6	6
11	Souths Logan Magpies (U17s)	2	2	4	4	6	6	6
12	Redcliffe Dolphins (U17s)	2	2	2	4	4	6	6
13	Mackay Cutters (U17s)	2	4	5	5	5	5	5
14	Northern Pride (U17s)	2	2	2	2	2	4	4
15	Wide Bay Bulls (U17s)	0	0	0	0	2	2	2

Season Results:

Home	Score	Away	Match Information
Home	Score	Away	Date and Time	Venue	Referee	Video
Round 1
Brisbane Tigers (U17s)	6 – 14	Souths Logan Magpies (U17s)	Saturday, 7 February, 11:30am	Totally Workwear Stadium	TBA
Wide Bay Bulls (U17s)	0 – 66	Norths Devils (U17s)	Saturday, 7 February, 1:20pm	The Waves Sporting Complex	TBA
Sunshine Coast Falcons (U17s)	20 – 32	Redcliffe Dolphins (U17s)	Saturday, 7 February, 2:35pm	Sunshine Coast Stadium	TBA
Wynnum Manly Seagulls (U17s)	10 – 4	Tweed Heads Seagulls (U17s)	Sunday, 8 February, 1:30pm	BMD Kougari Oval	TBA
Burleigh Bears (U17s)	BYE	Townsville Blackhawks (U17s)
Central Queensland Capras (U17s)	BYE	Western Clydesdales (U17s)
Mackay Cutters (U17s)	BYE	Ipswich Jets (U17s)
Northern Pride (U17s)	BYE
Round 2
Burleigh Bears (U17s)	22 – 4	Brisbane Tigers (U17s)	Saturday, 14 February, 11:40am	Betty Diamond Sports Complex	TBA
Wide Bay Bulls (U17s)	20 – 36	Central Queensland Capras (U17s)	Saturday, 14 February, 1:20pm	The Waves Sporting Complex	TBA
Mackay Cutters (U17s)	18 – 10	Western Clydesdales (U17s)	Saturday, 14 February, 1:40pm	Rugby League Mackay Grounds	TBA
Redcliffe Dolphins (U17s)	6 – 38	Norths Devils (U17s)	Saturday, 14 February, 3:20pm	Kayo Stadium	TBA
Townsville Blackhawks (U17s)	16 – 18	Sunshine Coast Falcons (U17s)	Saturday, 14 February, 5:00pm	Jack Manski Oval	TBA
Ipswich Jets (U17s)	24 – 8	Northern Pride (U17s)	Sunday, 15 February, 11:30am	Richardson Park	TBA
Souths Logan Magpies (U17s)	6 – 14	Wynnum Manly Seagulls (U17s)	Sunday, 15 February, 11:40am	Davies Park	TBA
Tweed Heads Seagulls (U17s)		BYE
Round 3
Tweed Heads Seagulls (U17s)	12 – 22	Ipswich Jets (U17s)	Saturday, 21 February, 11:00am	Preston Building Sports Complex	Kai Turner
Burleigh Bears (U17s)	24 – 14	Redcliffe Dolphins (U17s)	Saturday, 21 February, 1:20pm	UAA Park	Ben Casey
Brisbane Tigers (U17s)	44 – 0	Wide Bay Bulls (U17s)	Saturday, 21 February, 2:00pm	Totally Workwear Stadium	Lachlan Ware
Norths Devils (U17s)	22 – 32	Wynnum Manly Seagulls (U17s)	Saturday, 21 February, 3:20pm	Premiers' Park	Edward Goddard
Central Queensland Capras (U17s)	42 – 10	Western Clydesdales (U17s)	Saturday, 21 February, 4:40pm	Webb Park	Tegan Kelly
Sunshine Coast Falcons (U17s)	34 – 6	Northern Pride (U17s)	Sunday, 22 February, 12:20pm	Sunshine Coast Stadium	Ethan Brown
Townsville Blackhawks (U17s)	0 – 0*	Mackay Cutters (U17s)	N/A
Souths Logan Magpies (U17s)		BYE
Round 4
Brisbane Tigers (U17s)	24 – 22	Ipswich Jets (U17s)	Saturday, 28 February, 12:30pm	Totally Workwear Stadium	Cooper Lea
Sunshine Coast Falcons (U17s)	38 – 4	Wide Bay Bulls (U17s)	Saturday, 28 February, 1:20pm	Sunshine Coast Stadium	Ethan Garton
Central Queensland Capras (U17s)	10 – 6	Mackay Cutters (U17s)	Saturday, 28 February, 1:40pm	Webb Park	Tegan Kelly
Northern Pride (U17s)	4 – 32	Townsville Blackhawks (U17s)	Saturday, 28 February, 4:10pm	Barlow Park	Lachlan Ware
Western Clydesdales (U17s)	14 – 22	Tweed Heads Seagulls (U17s)	Sunday, 1 March, 11:20am	Toowoomba Sports Ground	Kai Turner
Souths Logan Magpies (U17s)	12 – 28	Burleigh Bears (U17s)	Sunday, 1 March, 1:30pm	Davies Park	Ethan Brown
Norths Devils (U17s)	BYE	Redcliffe Dolphins (U17s)
Wynnum Manly Seagulls (U17s)	BYE
Round 5
Wynnum Manly Seagulls (U17s)	38 – 6	Central Queensland Capras (U17s)	Saturday, 7 March, 12:10pm	BMD Kougari Oval	Cooper Lea
Ipswich Jets (U17s)	18 – 26	Townsville Blackhawks (U17s)	Saturday, 7 March, 1:20pm	Richardson Park	Kai Turner
Norths Devils (U17s)	30 – 14	Burleigh Bears (U17s)	Saturday, 7 March, 2:55pm	Premiers' Park	Ethan Brown
Mackay Cutters (U17s)	18 – 19	Sunshine Coast Falcons (U17s)	Saturday, 7 March, 4:40pm	BB Print Stadium	Thomas Horne
Redcliffe Dolphins (U17s)	14 – 20	Brisbane Tigers (U17s)	Sunday, 8 March, 10:20am	Kayo Stadium	Jack Thornton
Souths Logan Magpies (U17s)	24 – 18	Tweed Heads Seagulls (U17s)	Sunday, 8 March, 1:00pm	Davies Park	Ben Casey
Western Clydesdales (U17s)	24 – 12	Northern Pride (U17s)	Sunday, 8 March, 1:00pm	Toowoomba Sports Ground	Lachlan Ware
Wide Bay Bulls (U17s)		BYE
Round 6
Tweed Heads Seagulls (U17s)	6 – 38	Norths Devils (U17s)	Saturday, 14 March, 11:00am	Preston Building Sports Complex	TBA
Wide Bay Bulls (U17s)	10 – 28	Western Clydesdales (U17s)	Saturday, 14 March, 1:20pm	The Waves Sporting Complex	Chris Henderson
Northern Pride (U17s)	14 – 8	Brisbane Tigers (U17s)	Saturday, 14 March, 1:30pm	Barlow Park	Cooper Lea
Redcliffe Dolphins (U17s)	28 – 14	Central Queensland Capras (U17s)	Saturday, 14 March, 1:30pm	Kayo Stadium	Ben Casey
Burleigh Bears (U17s)	16 – 22	Wynnum Manly Seagulls (U17s)	Saturday, 14 March, 1:40pm	UAA Park	Lachlan Ware
Mackay Cutters (U17s)	0 – 28	Townsville Blackhawks (U17s)	Saturday, 14 March, 2:40pm	BB Print Stadium	TBA
Souths Logan Magpies (U17s)	22 – 24	Ipswich Jets (U17s)	Sunday, 15 March, 12:00pm	Davies Park	Kai Turner
Sunshine Coast Falcons (U17s)		BYE
Round 7
Tweed Heads Seagulls (U17s)	18 – 0	Burleigh Bears (U17s)	Saturday, 21 March, 11:00am	Preston Building Sports Complex	Jack Thornton
Ipswich Jets (U17s)	78 – 6	Wide Bay Bulls (U17s)	Saturday, 21 March, 1:20pm	Richardson Park	Kai Turner
Mackay Cutters (U17s)	14 – 24	Central Queensland Capras (U17s)	Saturday, 21 March, 2:40pm	BB Print Stadium	Tegan Kelly
Townsville Blackhawks (U17s)	58 – 0	Northern Pride (U17s)	Saturday, 21 March, 5:00pm	Jack Manski Oval	Jai Sturgess
Western Clydesdales (U17s)	6 – 34	Sunshine Coast Falcons (U17s)	Sunday, 22 March, 11:50am	Toowoomba Sports Ground	Cooper Lea
Wynnum Manly Seagulls (U17s)	58 – 8	Redcliffe Dolphins (U17s)	Sunday, 22 March, 11:50am	BMD Kougari Oval	Ethan Brown
Norths Devils (U17s)	56 – 6	Souths Logan Magpies (U17s)	Sunday, 22 March, 12:45pm	Premiers' Park	Lachlan Ware
Brisbane Tigers (U17s)		BYE
Finals Series
Semi-Finals
Norths Devils (U17s)	44 – 12	Sunshine Coast Falcons (U17s)	Saturday, 28 March, 11:30am	Totally Workwear Stadium	Cooper Lea
Wynnum Manly Seagulls (U17s)	28 – 18	Townsville Blackhawks (U17s)	Saturday, 28 March, 2:00pm	Jack Manski Oval	Lachlan Ware
Grand Final
Wynnum Manly Seagulls (U17s)	V	Norths Devils (U17s)	Saturday, 11 April, 2:00pm	Kayo Stadium	TBA

==== Grand Final ====
Semi-Finals
1	Wynnum Manly	28
4	Townsville	18
2	Norths	44
3	Sunshine Coast	12

Grand Final
Wynnum Manly
Norths

2026 Cyril Connell Cup Grand Final

Saturday, 11 April 2026
2:00pm

Wynnum Manly Seagulls (U17s)	v	Norths Devils (U17s)

Kayo Stadium, Brisbane

=== Under 17s Women's ===
The QRL Under 17s Women's Premiership (Named the Harvey Norman Under 17s for sponsorship reasons) is the Queensland Rugby League's statewide under 17s competition for female players and the entry point to the elite female pathway. It feeds directly into the Harvey Norman Under 19s and, ultimately, the Queensland Women's Premiership and NRLW.

2026 QRL Under 17s Women's Premiership
- Duration: 7 February – 11/12 April 2026
- Teams: 15
- Broadcast partners: Streaming; QPlus TV (All Matches)

==== Teams ====
The competition will feature the same 15 teams that competed in 2025. All 14 Australian based Queensland Cup sides field a team in this competition plus the Bundaberg based Wide Bay Bulls.

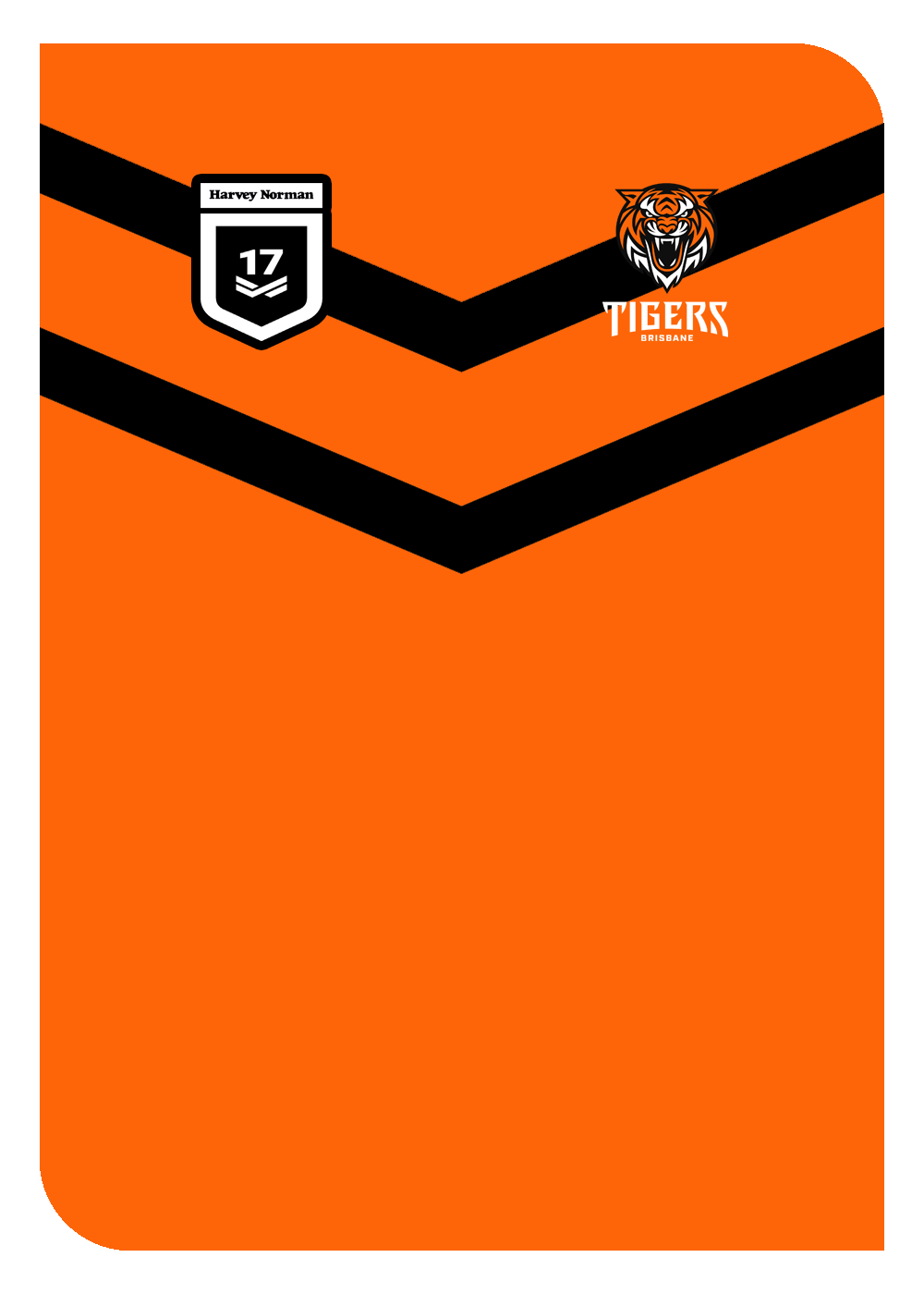
Brisbane Tigers Ground: Totally Workwear Stadium City/Suburb: Brisbane (Stones Corner) Coach: TBA Affiliate: Brisbane Tigers

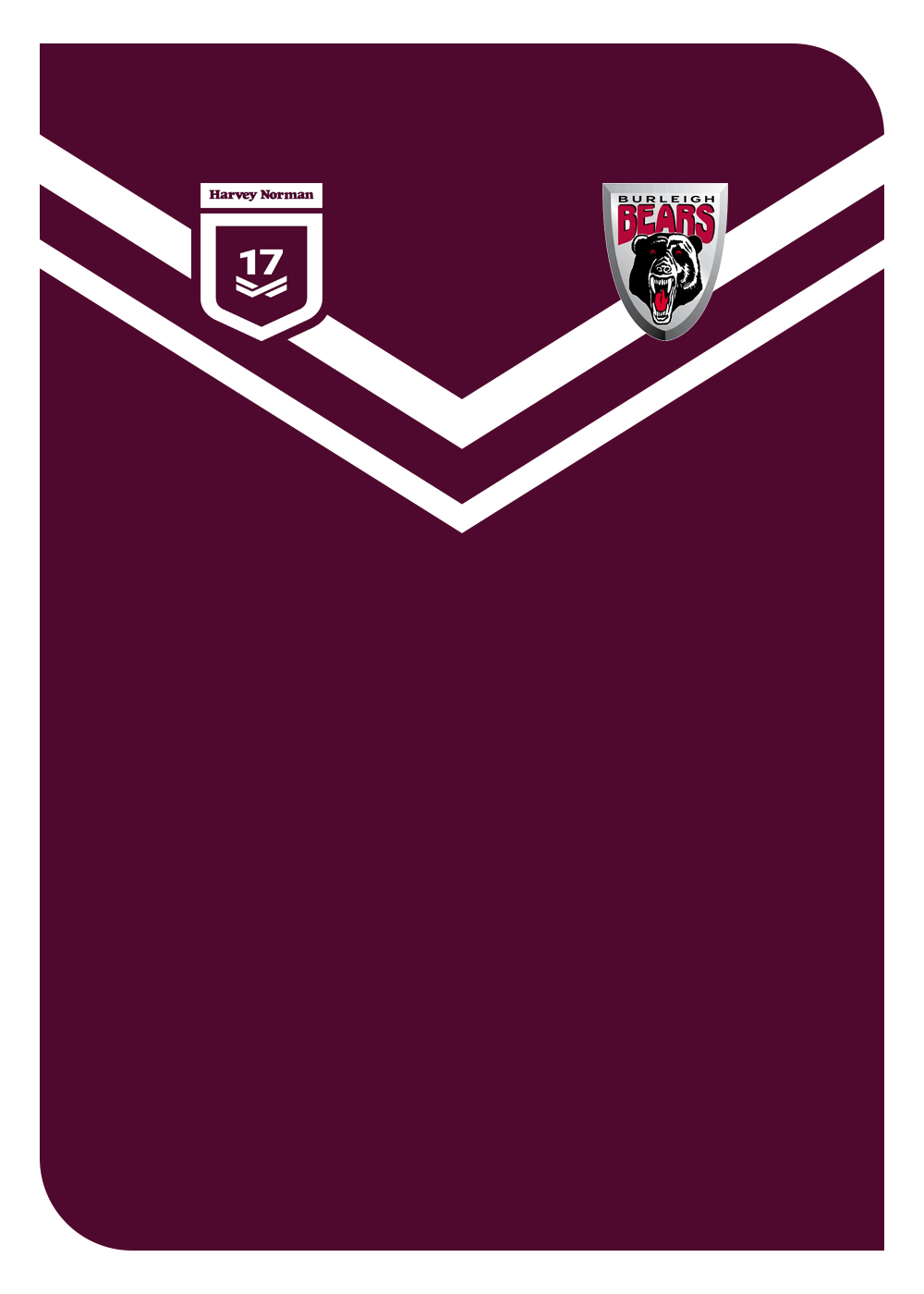
Burleigh Bears Ground: UAA Park City/Suburb: Gold Coast (Miami) Coach: TBA Affiliate: Burleigh Bears

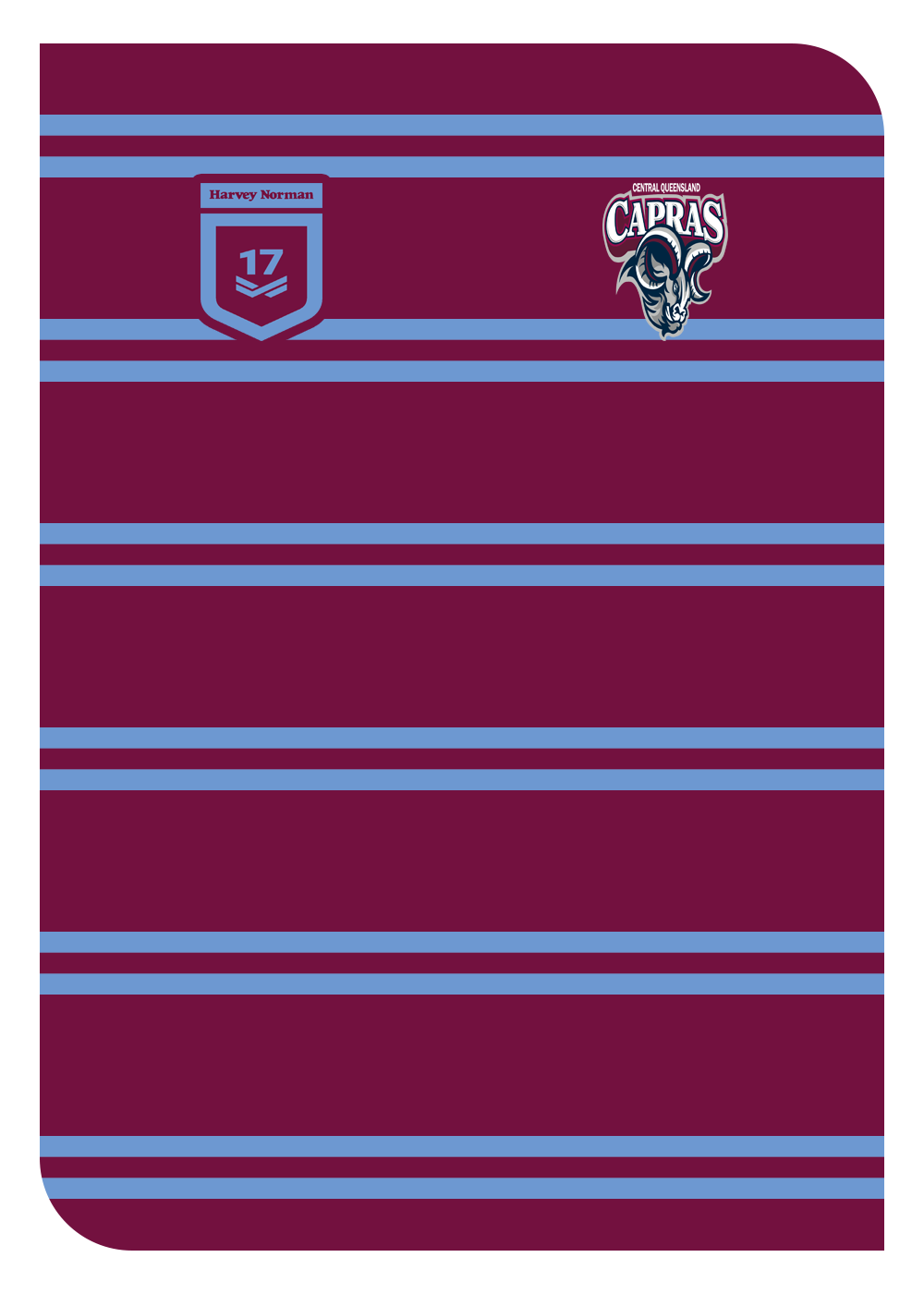
Central Queensland Capras Ground: Browne Park City/Suburb: Rockhampton (Wandal) Coach: TBA Affiliate: Central Queensland Capras

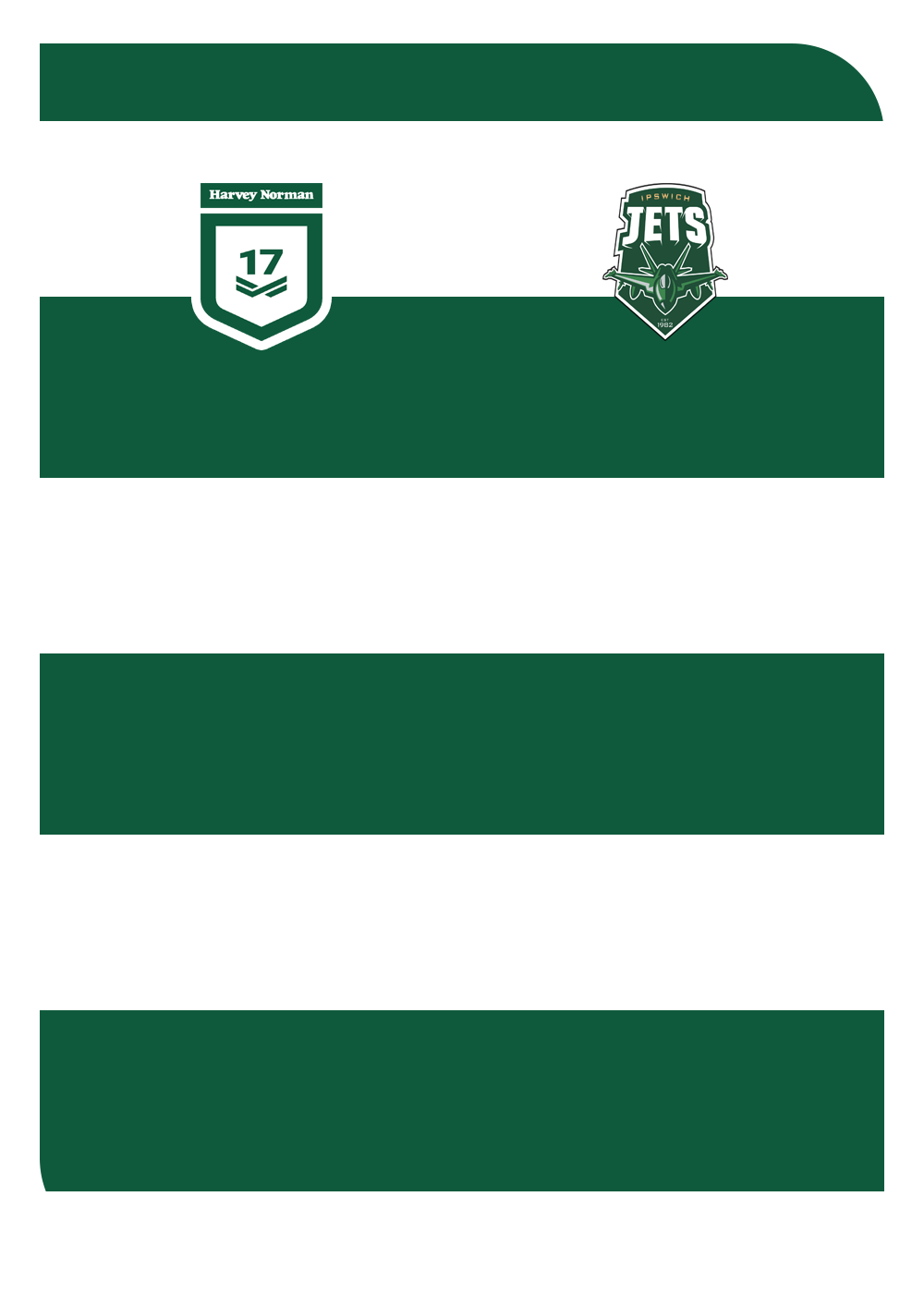
Ipswich Jets Ground: North Ipswich Reserve City/Suburb: Brisbane (Ipswich) Coach: TBA Affiliate: Ipswich Jets

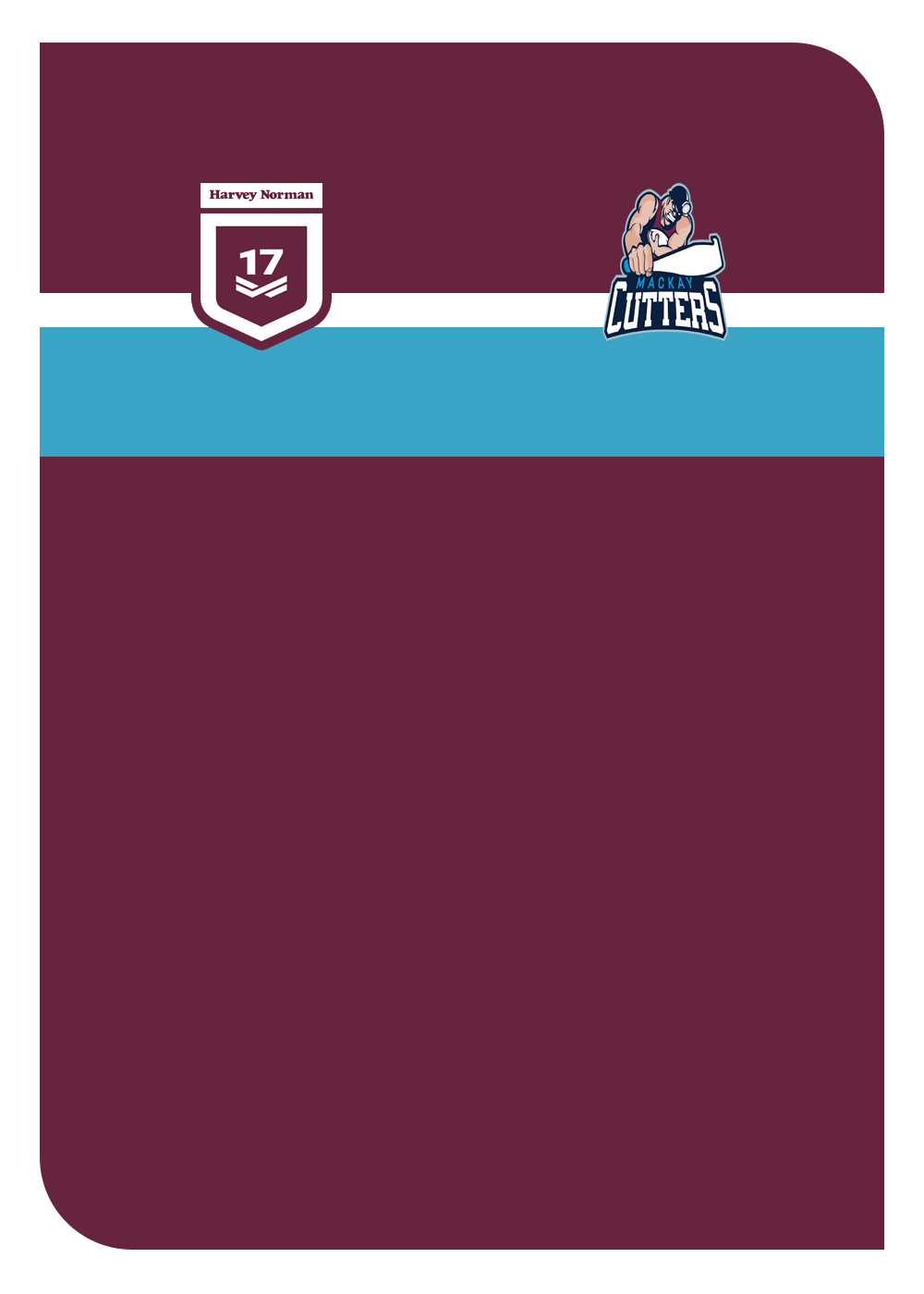
Mackay Cutters Ground: BB Print Stadium City/Suburb: Mackay (South Mackay) Coach: TBA Affiliate: Mackay Cutters

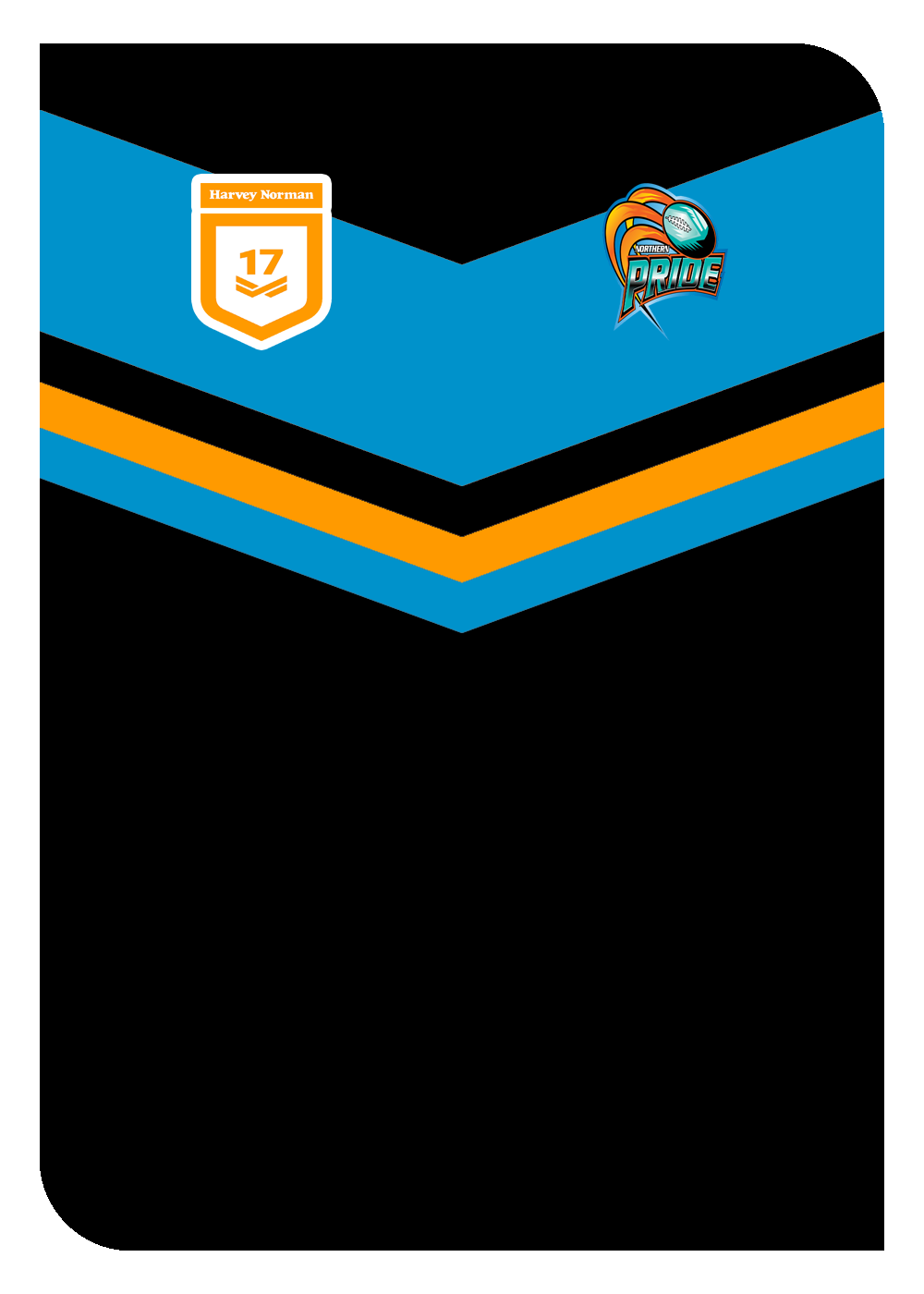
Northern Pride Ground: Barlow Park City/Suburb: Cairns (Parramatta Park) Coach: TBA Affiliate: Northern Pride

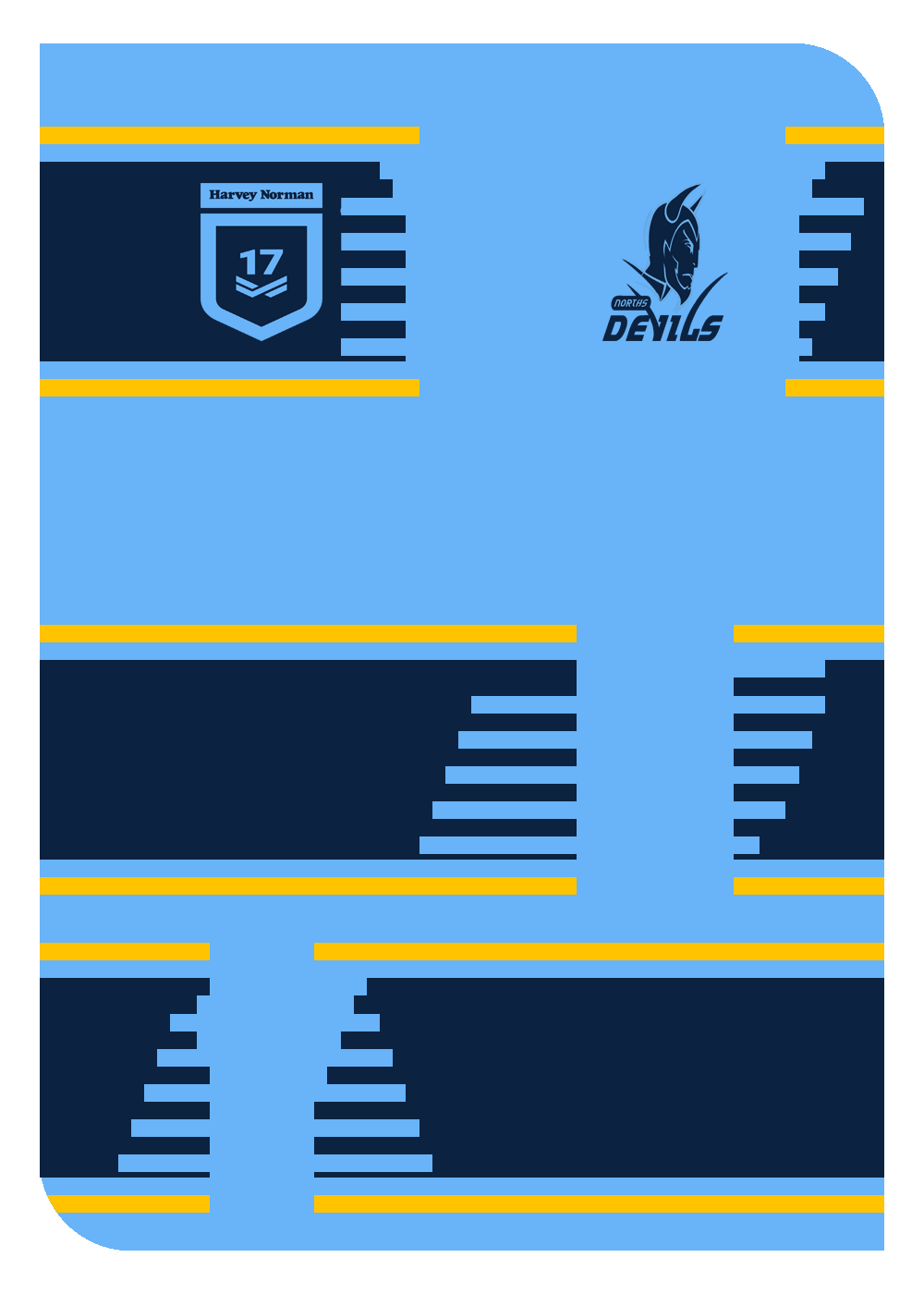
Norths Devils Ground: Premiers' Park City/Suburb: Brisbane (Nundah) Coach: TBA Affiliate: Norths Devils

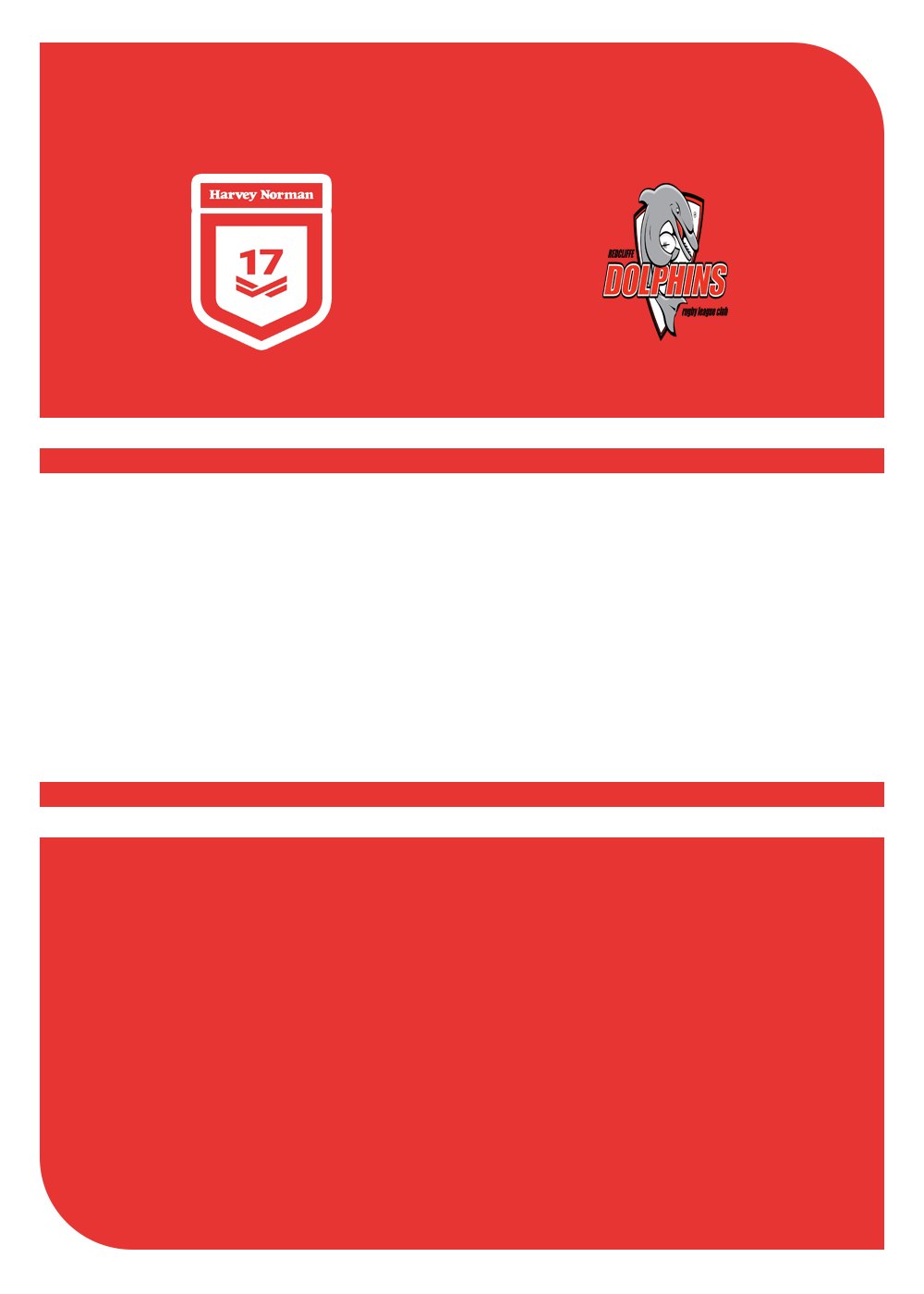
Redcliffe Dolphins Ground: Kayo Stadium City/Suburb: Brisbane (Redcliffe) Coach: TBA Affiliate: Redcliffe Dolphins

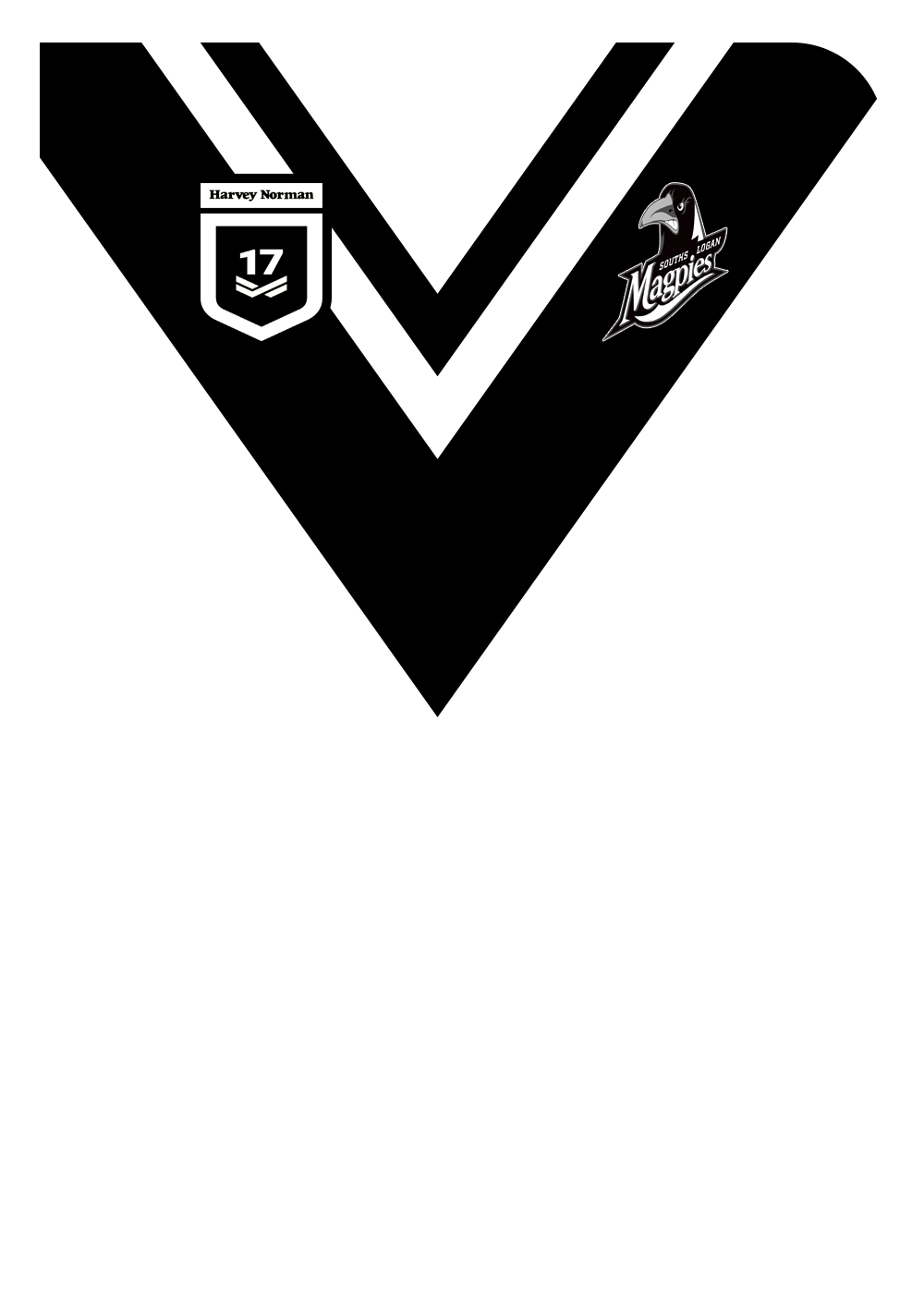
Souths Logan Magpies Ground: Davies Park City/Suburb: Brisbane (West End) Coach: TBA Affiliate: Souths Logan Magpies

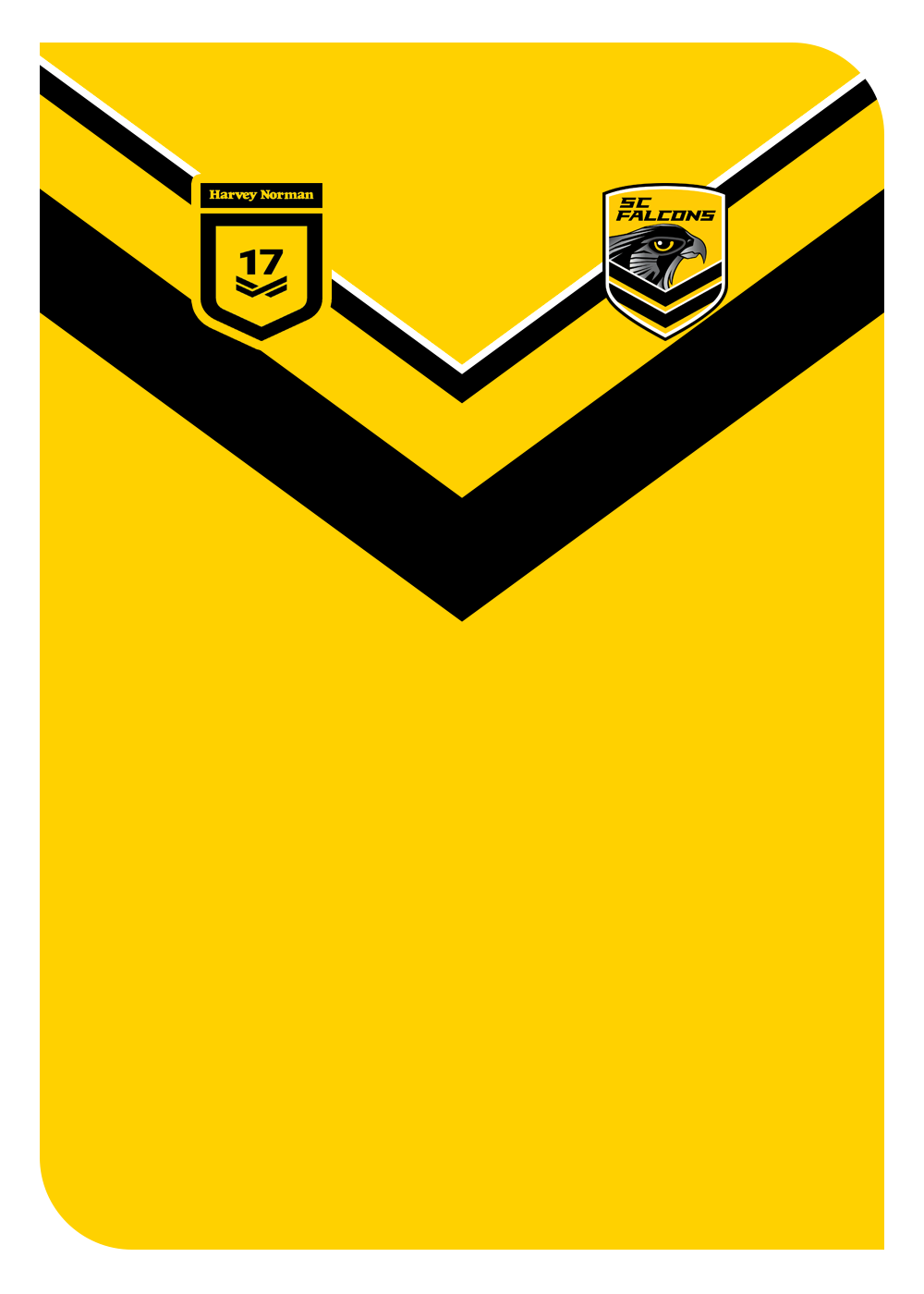
Sunshine Coast Falcons Ground: Sunshine Coast Stadium City/Suburb: Sunshine Coast (Bokarina) Coach: TBA Affiliate: Sunshine Coast Falcons

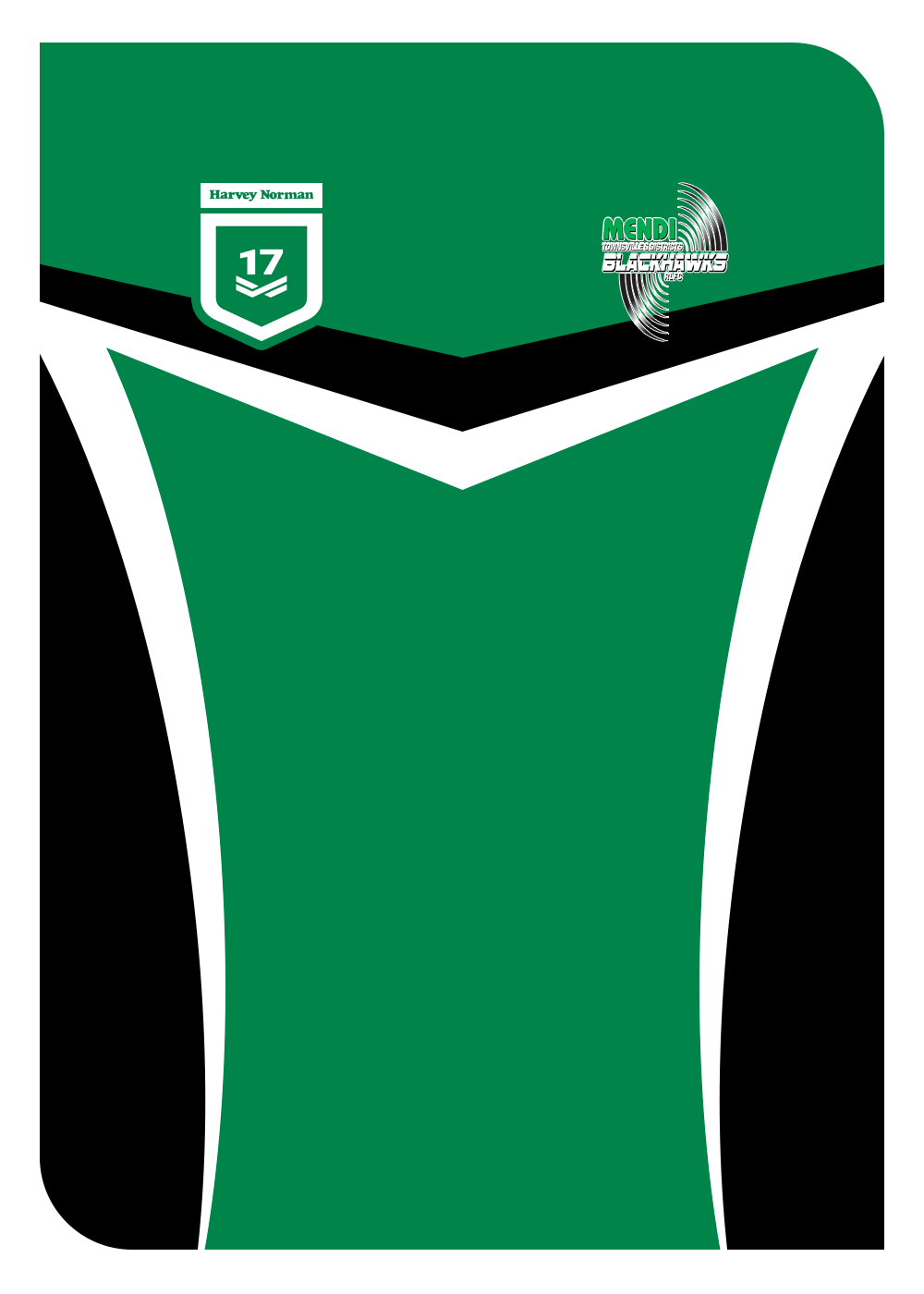
Townsville Blackhawks Ground: Jack Manski Oval City/Suburb: Townsville (Kirwan) Coach: TBA Affiliate: Townsville Blackhawks

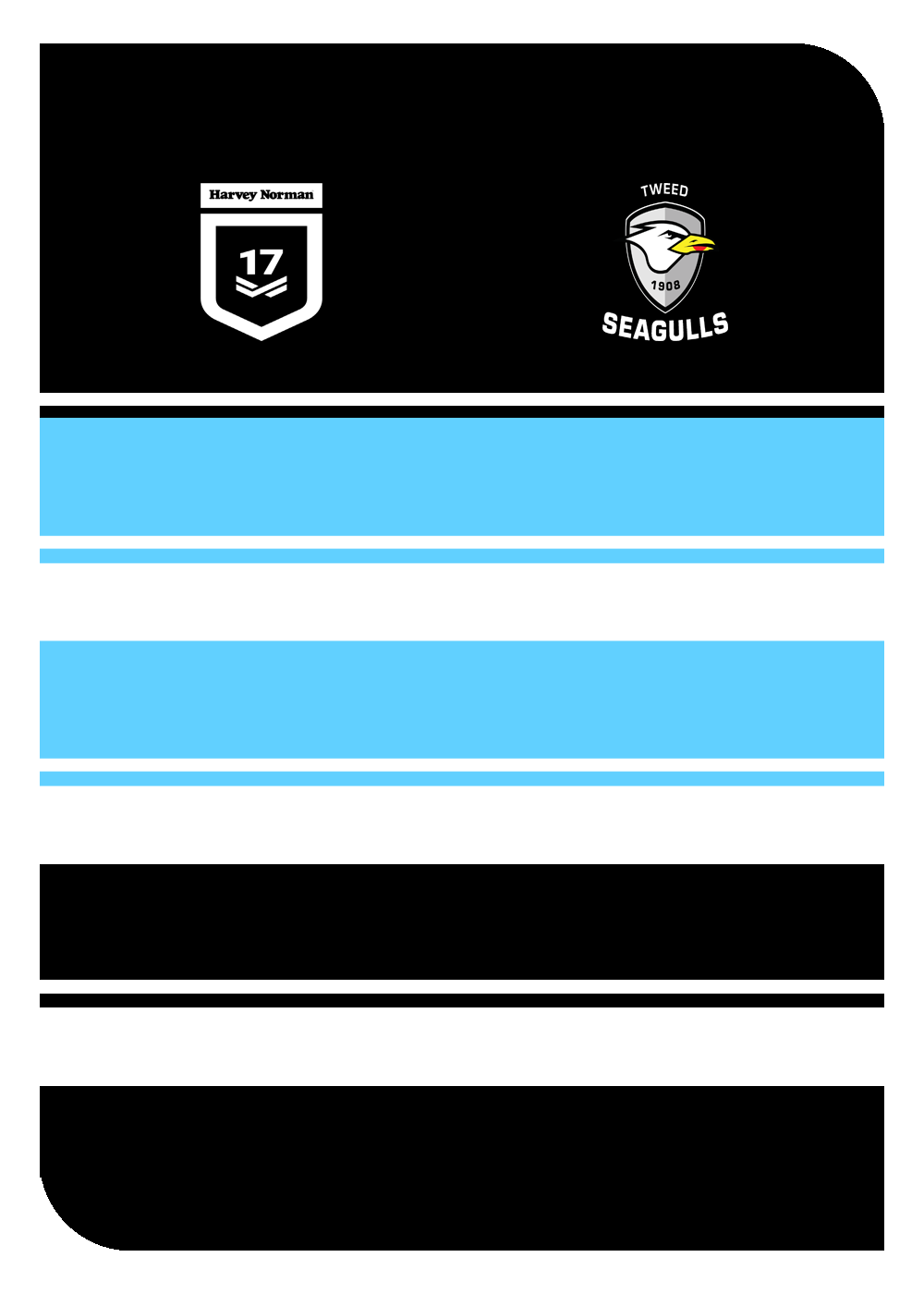
Tweed Heads Seagulls Ground: Preston Building Sports Complex City/Suburb: Tweed Heads (Tweed Heads West) Coach: TBA Affiliate: Tweed Heads Seagulls

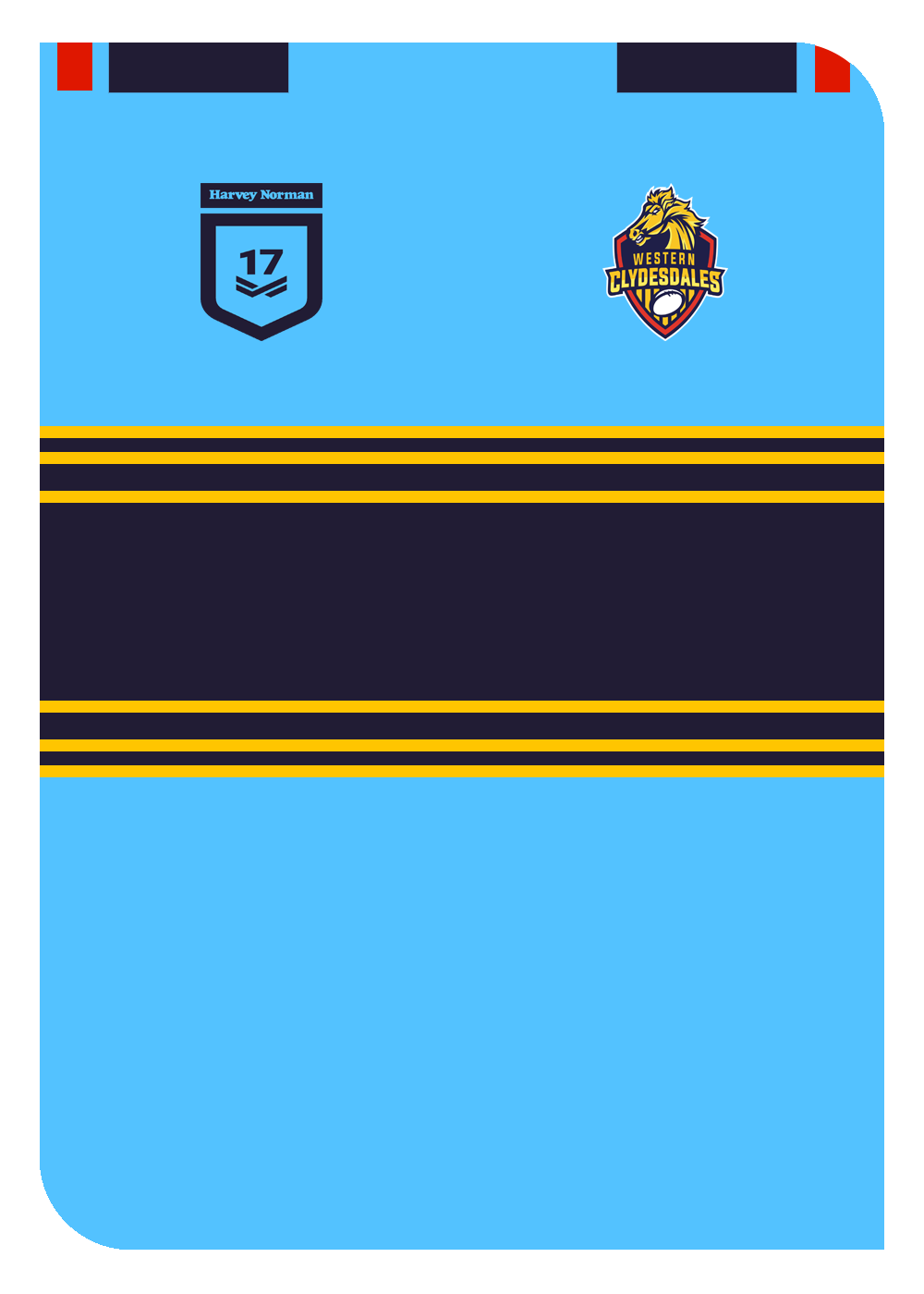
Western Clydesdales Ground: Toowoomba Sports Ground City/Suburb: Toowoomba (East Toowoomba) Coach: TBA Affiliate: Western Clydesdales

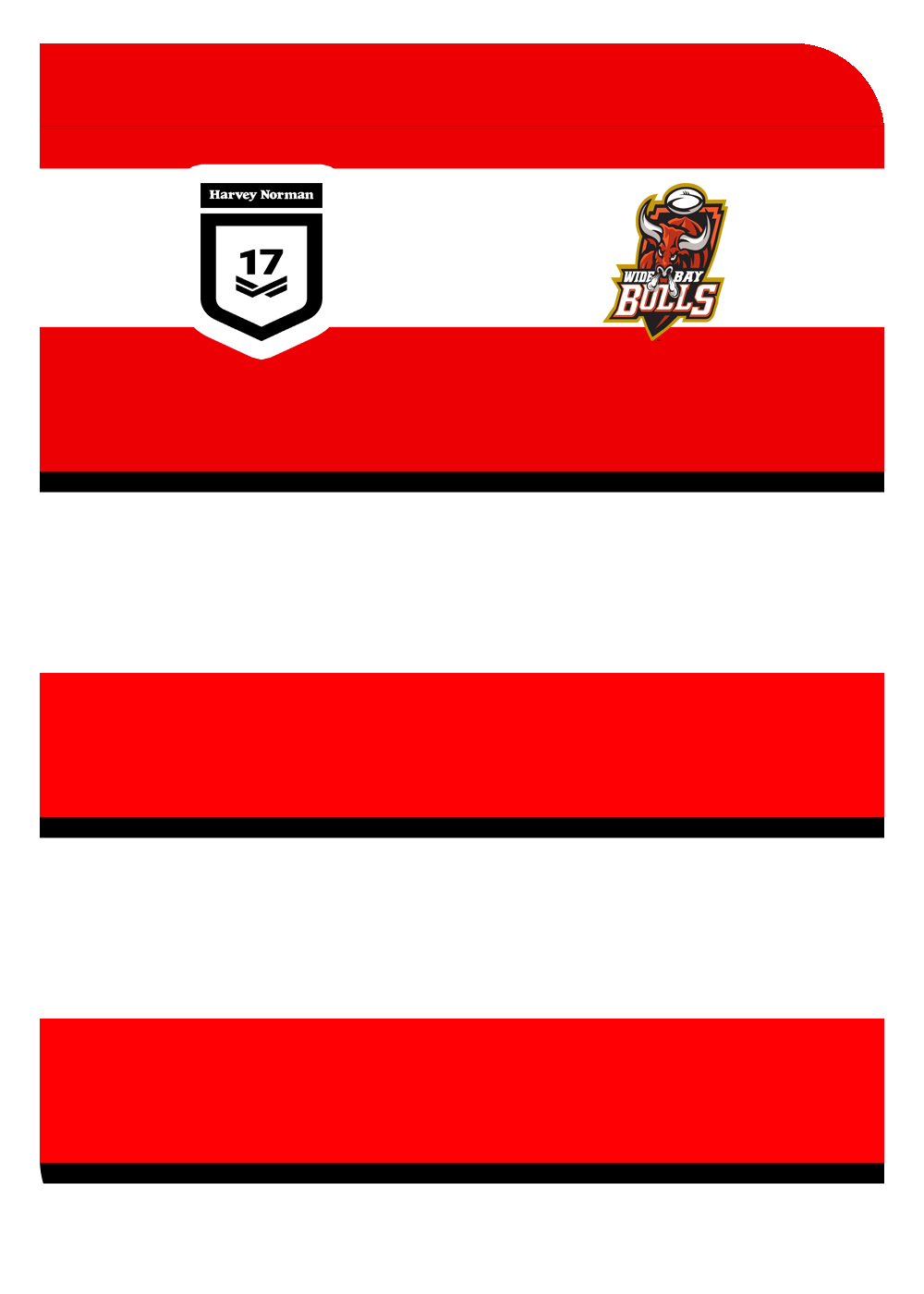
Wide Bay Bulls Ground: Salter Oval City/Suburb: Bundaberg (Bundaberg West) Coach: TBA Affiliate: N/A

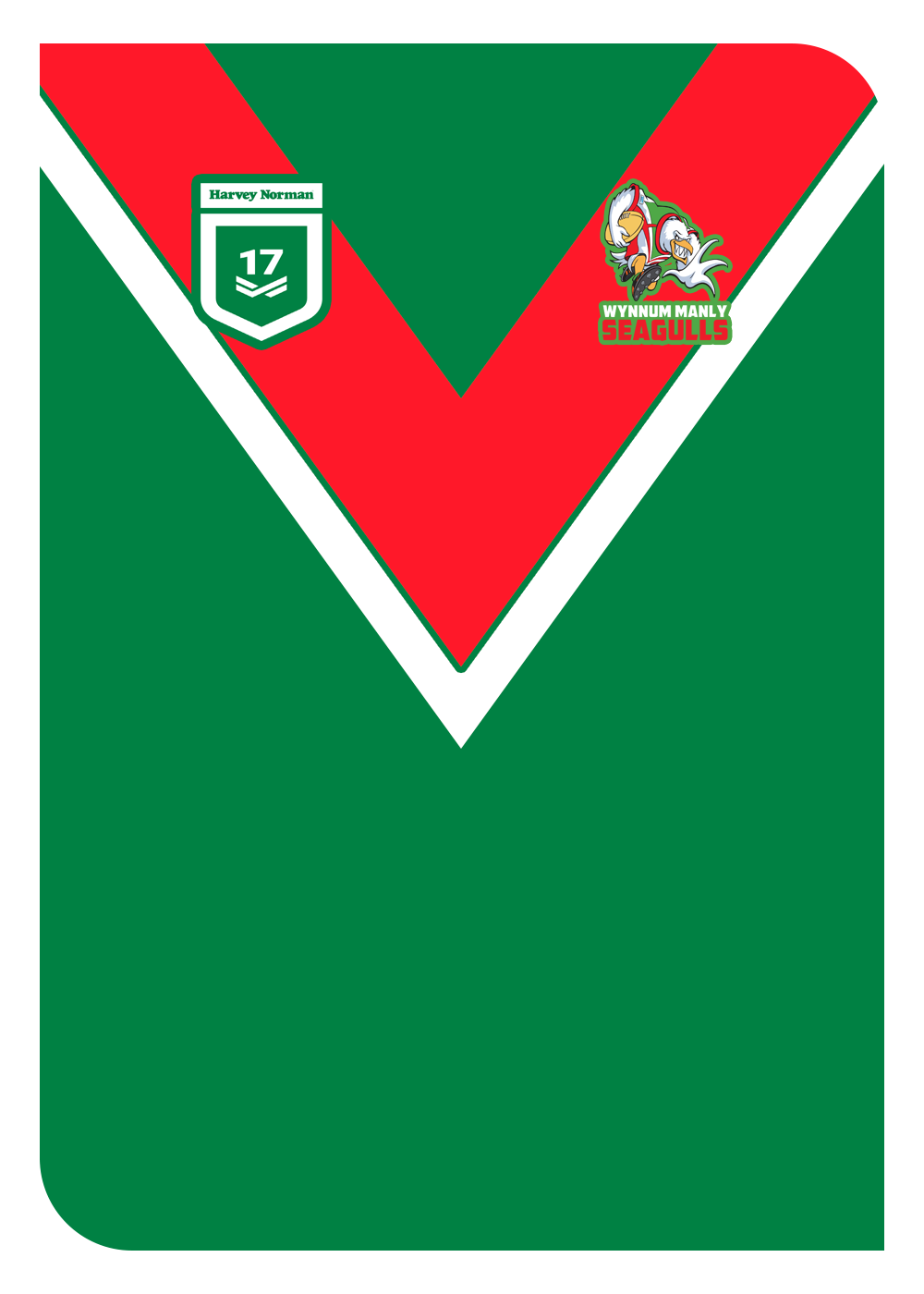
Wynnum Manly Seagulls Ground: BMD Kougari Oval City/Suburb: Brisbane (Manly West) Coach: TBA Affiliate: Wynnum Manly Seagulls

==== Ladder ====
Pos	Team	Pld	W	D	L	B	PF	PA	PD	Pts	Qualification
1	Souths Logan Magpies (U17s G)	6	6	0	0	1	268	34	+234	14	Minor Premiers & Semi-Finals
2	Burleigh Bears (U17s G)	6	5	0	1	1	174	76	+98	12	Semi-Finals
3	Western Clydesdales (U17s G)	6	5	0	1	1	130	58	+72	12	Semi-Finals
4	Townsville Blackhawks (U17s G)	6	4	1	1	1	116	56	+60	11	Semi-Finals
5	Wynnum Manly Seagulls (U17s G)	6	3	1	2	1	104	94	+10	9	
6	Central Queensland Capras (U17s G)	6	3	0	3	1	154	68	+86	8	
7	Brisbane Tigers (U17s G)	6	3	0	3	1	182	126	+56	8	
8	Ipswich Jets (U17s G)	6	3	0	3	1	146	140	+6	8	
9	Northern Pride (U17s G)	6	3	0	3	1	100	150	–50	8	
10	Tweed Heads Seagulls (U17s G)	6	2	1	3	1	80	124	–44	7	
11	Redcliffe Dolphins (U17s G)	6	2	0	4	1	116	92	+24	6	
12	Sunshine Coast Falcons (U17s G)	6	3	0	3	0	104	90	+14	6	
13	Norths Devils (U17s G)	6	1	0	5	1	70	214	-144	4	
14	Mackay Cutters (U17s G)	6	0	1	5	1	22	118	–96	3	
15	Wide Bay Bulls (U17s G)	6	0	0	6	1	10	336	-326	2	

Updated to match(es) played on 1 September. Source:
Rules for classification: 1) points; 2) point difference; 3) points scored

===== Ladder progression =====
- Numbers highlighted in green indicate that the team finished the round inside the top 4.
- Numbers highlighted in blue indicates the team finished first on the ladder in that round.
- Numbers highlighted in red indicates the team finished last place on the ladder in that round.
- Underlined numbers indicate that the team had a bye during that round.

Pos	Team	1	2	3	4	5	6	7
1	Souths Logan Magpies (U17s G)	2	4	6	8	10	12	14
2	Burleigh Bears (U17s G)	2	4	6	6	8	10	12
3	Western Clydesdales (U17s G)	2	4	6	8	8	10	12
4	Townsville Blackhawks (U17s G)	2	4	5	5	7	9	11
5	Wynnum Manly Seagulls (U17s G)	1	1	3	5	7	7	9
6	Central Queensland Capras (U17s G)	2	4	4	6	6	6	8
7	Brisbane Tigers (U17s G)	0	0	2	2	4	6	8
8	Ipswich Jets (U17s G)	2	4	4	6	6	6	8
9	Northern Pride (U17s G)	2	2	4	6	8	8	8
10	Tweed Heads Seagulls (U17s G)	1	3	5	5	5	7	7
11	Redcliffe Dolphins (U17s G)	0	2	2	4	4	6	6
12	Sunshine Coast Falcons (U17s G)	2	2	2	4	6	8	8
13	Norths Devils (U17s G)	2	2	2	4	4	4	4
14	Mackay Cutters (U17s G)	2	2	3	3	3	3	3
15	Wide Bay Bulls (U17s G)	0	0	0	0	2	2	2

Season Results:

Home	Score	Away	Match Information
Home	Score	Away	Date and Time	Venue	Referee	Video
Round 1
Brisbane Tigers (U17s G)	16 – 46	Souths Logan Magpies (U17s G)	Saturday, 7 February, 10:00am	Totally Workwear Stadium	TBA
Wide Bay Bulls (U17s G)	0 – 42	Norths Devils (U17s G)	Saturday, 7 February, 12:00pm	The Waves Sporting Complex	TBA
Sunshine Coast Falcons (U17s G)	14 – 12	Redcliffe Dolphins (U17s G)	Saturday, 7 February, 1:15pm	Sunshine Coast Stadium	TBA
Wynnum Manly Seagulls (U17s G)	14 – 14	Tweed Heads Seagulls (U17s G)	Sunday, 8 February, 10:30am	BMD Kougari Oval	TBA
Burleigh Bears (U17s G)	BYE	Townsville Blackhawks (U17s G)
Central Queensland Capras (U17s G)	BYE	Western Clydesdales (U17s G)
Mackay Cutters (U17s G)	BYE	Ipswich Jets (U17s G)
Northern Pride (U17s G)	BYE
Round 2
Burleigh Bears (U17s G)	36 – 0	Brisbane Tigers (U17s G)	Saturday, 14 February, 10:20am	Betty Diamond Sports Complex	TBA
Wide Bay Bulls (U17s G)	0 – 62	Central Queensland Capras (U17s G)	Saturday, 14 February, 12:00pm	The Waves Sporting Complex	TBA
Mackay Cutters (U17s G)	6 – 12	Western Clydesdales (U17s G)	Saturday, 14 February, 12:20pm	Rugby League Mackay Grounds	TBA
Redcliffe Dolphins (U17s G)	36 – 0	Norths Devils (U17s G)	Saturday, 14 February, 2:00pm	Kayo Stadium	TBA
Townsville Blackhawks (U17s G)	16 – 4	Sunshine Coast Falcons (U17s G)	Saturday, 14 February, 3:30pm	Jack Manski Oval	TBA
Souths Logan Magpies (U17s G)	26 – 0	Wynnum Manly Seagulls (U17s G)	Sunday, 15 February, 9:00am	Davies Park	TBA
Ipswich Jets (U17s G)	38 – 18	Northern Pride (U17s G)	Sunday, 15 February, 10:00am	Richardson Park	TBA
Tweed Heads Seagulls (U17s G)		BYE
Round 3
Burleigh Bears (U17s G)	36 – 6	Redcliffe Dolphins (U17s G)	Saturday, 21 February, 12:00pm	UAA Park	Xavier Wright
Brisbane Tigers (U17s G)	84 – 0	Wide Bay Bulls (U17s G)	Saturday, 21 February, 12:30pm	Totally Workwear Stadium	Andrew Kalpakidas
Tweed Heads Seagulls (U17s G)	20 – 18	Ipswich Jets (U17s G)	Saturday, 21 February, 12:30pm	Preston Building Sports Complex	Kai Hoger
Norths Devils (U17s G)	6 – 38	Wynnum Manly Seagulls (U17s G)	Saturday, 21 February, 12:40pm	Premiers' Park	Blake Douglas
Central Queensland Capras (U17s G)	16 – 18	Western Clydesdales (U17s G)	Saturday, 21 February, 2:00pm	Webb Park	Nick Taylor
Sunshine Coast Falcons (U17s G)	20 – 22	Northern Pride (U17s G)	Sunday, 22 February, 11:00am	Sunshine Coast Stadium	Lucas Bourke
Townsville Blackhawks (U17s G)	0 – 0*	Mackay Cutters (U17s G)	N/A
Souths Logan Magpies (U17s G)		BYE
Round 4
Brisbane Tigers (U17s G)	14 – 20	Ipswich Jets (U17s G)	Saturday, 28 February, 11:00am	Totally Workwear Stadium	Thomas Burke
Central Queensland Capras (U17s G)	26 – 0	Mackay Cutters (U17s G)	Saturday, 28 February, 11:00am	Webb Park	Noah Williams
Sunshine Coast Falcons (U17s G)	50 – 0	Wide Bay Bulls (U17s G)	Saturday, 28 February, 12:00pm	Sunshine Coast Stadium	Kai Hoger
Northern Pride (U17s G)	22 – 18	Townsville Blackhawks (U17s G)	Saturday, 28 February, 4:10pm	Barlow Park	Ethan Bain
Western Clydesdales (U17s G)	14 – 8	Tweed Heads Seagulls (U17s G)	Sunday, 1 March, 10:00am	Toowoomba Sports Ground	Lucas Bourke
Souths Logan Magpies (U17s G)	46 – 10	Burleigh Bears (U17s G)	Sunday, 1 March, 10:30am	Davies Park	Blake Douglas
Norths Devils (U17s G)	BYE	Redcliffe Dolphins (U17s G)
Wynnum Manly Seagulls (U17s G)	BYE
Round 5
Wynnum Manly Seagulls (U17s G)	22 – 14	Central Queensland Capras (U17s G)	Saturday, 7 March, 10:50am	BMD Kougari Oval	Blake Douglas
Ipswich Jets (U17s G)	18 – 36	Townsville Blackhawks (U17s G)	Saturday, 7 March, 12:00pm	Richardson Park	Lucas Bourke
Norths Devils (U17s G)	4 – 48	Burleigh Bears (U17s G)	Saturday, 7 March, 12:15pm	Premiers' Park	Xavier Wright
Mackay Cutters (U17s G)	12 – 16	Sunshine Coast Falcons (U17s G)	Saturday, 7 March, 2:00pm	BB Print Stadium	Noah Williams
Redcliffe Dolphins (U17s G)	16 – 20	Brisbane Tigers (U17s G)	Sunday, 8 March, 9:00am	Kayo Stadium	Kai Hoger
Souths Logan Magpies (U17s G)	32 – 4	Tweed Heads Seagulls (U17s G)	Sunday, 8 March, 11:40am	Davies Park	Thomas Burke
Western Clydesdales (U17s G)	8 – 22	Northern Pride (U17s G)	Sunday, 8 March, 11:40am	Toowoomba Sports Ground	Andrew Kalpakidas
Wide Bay Bulls (U17s G)		BYE
Round 6
Burleigh Bears (U17s G)	16 – 8	Wynnum Manly Seagulls (U17s G)	Saturday, 14 March, 12:00pm	UAA Park	Thomas Burke
Wide Bay Bulls (U17s G)	6 – 50	Western Clydesdales (U17s G)	Saturday, 14 March, 12:00pm	The Waves Sporting Complex	Kyle Pitchford
Mackay Cutters (U17s G)	4 – 28	Townsville Blackhawks (U17s G)	Saturday, 14 March, 12:00pm	BB Print Stadium	Noah Williams
Northern Pride (U17s G)	8 – 48	Brisbane Tigers (U17s G)	Saturday, 14 March, 12:00pm	Barlow Park	Ethan Bain
Redcliffe Dolphins (U17s G)	28 – 0	Central Queensland Capras (U17s G)	Saturday, 14 March, 12:10pm	Kayo Stadium	Blake Douglas
Tweed Heads Seagulls (U17s G)	22 – 18	Norths Devils (U17s G)	Saturday, 14 March, 12:30pm	Preston Building Sports Complex	Andrew Kalpakidas
Souths Logan Magpies (U17s G)	48 – 4	Ipswich Jets (U17s G)	Sunday, 15 March, 9:00am	Davies Park	TBA
Sunshine Coast Falcons (U17s G)		BYE
Round 7
Ipswich Jets (U17s G)	48 – 4	Wide Bay Bulls (U17s G)	Saturday, 21 March, 12:00pm	Richardson Park	Blake Douglas
Mackay Cutters (U17s G)	0 – 36	Central Queensland Capras (U17s G)	Saturday, 21 March, 12:00pm	BB Print Stadium	Luke McCulloch
Tweed Heads Seagulls (U17s G)	12 – 28	Burleigh Bears (U17s G)	Saturday, 21 March, 12:30pm	Preston Building Sports Complex	Kai Hoger
Townsville Blackhawks (U17s G)	18 – 8	Northern Pride (U17s G)	Saturday, 21 March, 3:30pm	Jack Manski Oval	Declan Wright
Wynnum Manly Seagulls (U17s G)	22 – 18	Redcliffe Dolphins (U17s G)	Sunday, 22 March, 9:00am	BMD Kougari Oval	Lucas Bourke
Norths Devils (U17s G)	0 – 70	Souths Logan Magpies (U17s G)	Sunday, 22 March, 10:00am	Premiers' Park	Andrew Kalpakidas
Western Clydesdales (U17s G)	28 – 0	Sunshine Coast Falcons (U17s G)	Sunday, 22 March, 10:30am	Toowoomba Sports Ground	Thomas Burke
Brisbane Tigers (U17s G)		BYE
Finals Series
Semi-Finals
Souths Logan Magpies (U17s G)	24 – 30	Townsville Blackhawks (U17s G)	Saturday, 28 March, 10:30am	Jack Manski Oval	Thomas Burke
Burleigh Bears (U17s G)	34 – 8	Western Clydesdales (U17s G)	Saturday, 28 March, 6:45pm	UAA Park	Lucas Bourke
Grand Final
Major SF Winner	V	PF Winner	Saturday, 11 April, 12:00pm	Kayo Stadium	TBA

==== Grand Final ====
Semi-Finals
1	Souths Logan	24
4	Townsville	30
2	Burleigh	34
3	Western	8

Grand Final
Burleigh
Townsville

2026 QRL Under 17's Women's Premiership Grand Final

Saturday, 11 April 2026
12:00pm

Burleigh Bears (U17s G)	v	Townsville Blackhawks (U17s G)

Kayo Stadium, Brisbane
